= Lithuania at the 2025 World Aquatics Championships =

- Flag of Lithuania
- World Aquatics code: LTU
- National federation: LTU Aquatics
- Website: ltuswimming.com

in Singapore
- Competitors: 13 in 2 sports
- Medals Ranked 19th: Gold 1 Silver 0 Bronze 0 Total 1

World Aquatics Championships appearances (overview)
- 1994; 1998; 2001; 2003; 2005; 2007; 2009; 2011; 2013; 2015; 2017; 2019; 2022; 2023; 2024; 2025

Other related appearances
- Soviet Union (1973–1991)

Lithuania is competing at the 2025 World Aquatics Championships in Singapore from 11 July to 3 August 2025.

== Medalists ==
Medal	Name	Sport	Event	Date
Gold	Rūta Meilutytė	Swimming	Women's 50 m breaststroke	28 July

Medals by sport
Sport	1st place, gold medalist(s)	2nd place, silver medalist(s)	3rd place, bronze medalist(s)	Total
Swimming	1	0	0	1
Total	1	0	0	1

== Competitors ==
The following is the list of competitors in the Championships.

Sport	Men	Women	Total
Diving	2	0	2
Swimming	8	3	11
Total	10	3	13

== Diving ==
Men

Athlete	Event	Preliminaries		Semifinals		Final	
Athlete	Event	Points	Rank	Points	Rank	Points	Rank
Sebastian Konecki	1 m springboard	279.85	42	—		Did not advance	
Sebastian Konecki	3 m springboard	258.85	64	Did not advance			
Martynas Lisauskas	1 m springboard	311.25	30	—		Did not advance	
Martynas Lisauskas	3 m springboard	344.60	36	Did not advance			

== Swimming ==
Men

Athlete	Event	Heat		Semifinal		Final	
Athlete	Event	Time	Rank	Time	Rank	Time	Rank
Tajus Juška	50 metre freestyle	22.88	53	Did not advance			
Tajus Juška	50 metre butterfly	24.13	43	Did not advance			
Tajus Juška	100 metre butterfly	Withdrew					
Danas Rapšys	100 metre freestyle	Withdrew					
Danas Rapšys	200 metre freestyle	1:47.58	24	Did not advance			
Aleksas Savickas	50 metre breaststroke	27.74	36	Did not advance			
Aleksas Savickas	100 metre breaststroke	1:00.64	23	Did not advance			
Aleksas Savickas	200 metre breaststroke	2:11.37	17	Did not advance			
Andrius Šidlauskas	100 metre breaststroke	59.98	15 Q	1:00.03	16	Did not advance	
Mantas Kaušpėdas	50 metre backstroke	24.95	18	Did not advance			
Mantas Kaušpėdas	100 metre backstroke	54.98	35	Did not advance			
Kristupas Trepočka	400 metre freestyle	3:51.34	30	Did not advance			
Tomas Navikonis; Danas Rapšys; Tomas Lukminas; Tajus Juška	4 × 100 metre freestyle relay	3:12.74 NR	8 Q	—		3:12.84	7
Danas Rapšys; Kristupas Trepočka; Tomas Lukminas; Tajus Juška	4 × 200 metre freestyle relay	7:10.48	11	—		Did not advance	
Mantas Kaušpėdas; Andrius Šidlauskas; Tajus Juška; Tomas Lukminas	4 × 100 metre medley relay	3:36.46	19	—		Did not advance	

Women

Athlete	Event	Heat		Semifinal		Final	
Athlete	Event	Time	Rank	Time	Rank	Time	Rank
Justine Murdock	50 metre backstroke	29.37	34	Did not advance			
Justine Murdock	100 metre backstroke	1:02.67	31	Did not advance			
Justine Murdock	200 metre backstroke	2:14.14	29	Did not advance			
Kotryna Teterevkova	50 metre breaststroke	31.02	23	Did not advance			
Kotryna Teterevkova	100 metre breaststroke	1:06.21	5 Q	1:06.17	8 Q	1:06.61	8
Kotryna Teterevkova	200 metre breaststroke	2:25.58	11 Q	2:22.98	3 Q	2:24.25	6
Rūta Meilutytė	50 metre breaststroke	29.82	1 Q	29.54	1 Q	29.55	1st place, gold medalist(s)
Rūta Meilutytė	100 metre breaststroke	1:06.55	8 Q	1:06.57	13	Did not advance	
