= Lithuania at the 2009 World Aquatics Championships =

- Flag of Lithuania
- World Aquatics code: LTU
- National federation: Lietuvos plaukimo federacija
- Website: www.ltuswimming.com

in Rome, Italy
- Competitors: 14 in 2 sports
- Medals Ranked 24thth: Gold 0 Silver 0 Bronze 1 Total 1

World Aquatics Championships appearances (overview)
- 1994; 1998; 2001; 2003; 2005; 2007; 2009; 2011; 2013; 2015; 2017; 2019; 2022; 2023; 2024; 2025

Other related appearances
- Soviet Union (1973–1991)

Lithuania competed at the 2009 World Aquatics Championships in Rome, Italy.

== Medalists ==
Medal	Name	Sport	Event	Date
Bronze	Giedrius Titenis	Swimming	Men's 200 m breaststroke	31 July

== Diving ==
Lithuania qualified 2 quota places for the following diving events.

Men

Athlete	Event	Preliminaries		Semifinal		Final	
Athlete	Event	Points	Rank	Points	Rank	Points	Rank
Ignas Barkauskas	1 m springboard	311.50	26	—N/a		did not advance	
Ignas Barkauskas	3 m springboard	314.65	43	did not advance			
Sergej Baziuk	3 m springboard	279.30	49	did not advance			
Ignas Barkauskas; Sergej Baziuk	3 m synchro springboard	327.42	19	—N/a		did not advance	

== Swimming ==
12 swimmers represented Lithuania:

Men

Athlete	Event	Heat		Semifinal		Final	
Athlete	Event	Time	Rank	Time	Rank	Time	Rank
Vaidotas Blažys	50 m breaststroke	28.52	57	did not advance			
Vaidotas Blažys	100 m breaststroke	1:02.67	61	did not advance			
Vytautas Janušaitis	50 m backstroke	25.24 (NR)	21	did not advance			
Vytautas Janušaitis	100 m butterfly	52.76 (NR)	46	did not advance			
Vytautas Janušaitis	200 m individual medley	2:00.32	19	did not advance			
Vytautas Janušaitis	400 m individual medley	4:26.52	34	did not advance			
Mindaugas Margis	200 m individual medley	2:06.99	54	did not advance			
Mindaugas Sadauskas	50 m freestyle	22.91	50	did not advance			
Mindaugas Sadauskas	100 m freestyle	49.26	36	did not advance			
Mindaugas Sadauskas	50 m backstroke	26.71	55	did not advance			
Rimvydas Šalčius	50 m butterfly	24.92	79	did not advance			
Rimvydas Šalčius	100 m butterfly	53.20	58	did not advance			
Giedrius Titenis	50 m breaststroke	27.57 (NR)	20	did not advance			
Giedrius Titenis	100 m breaststroke	59.24 (NR)	4	59.43	6	59.27	6
Giedrius Titenis	200 m breaststroke	2:09.28	7	2:08.35	5	2:07.80 (NR)	3rd place, bronze medalist(s)
Paulius Viktoravičius	50 m freestyle	22.55	35	did not advance			
Paulius Viktoravičius	100 m freestyle	48.84 (NR)	27	did not advance			
Paulius Viktoravičius	50 m butterfly	24.62	69	did not advance			
Vytautas Janušaitis; Paulius Viktoravičius; Mindaugas Sadauskas; Mindaugas Margis	4 × 100 m freestyle relay	3:16.47 (NR)	14	—N/a		did not advance	
Vytautas Janušaitis; Giedrius Titenis; Rimvydas Šalčius; Paulius Viktoravičius	4 × 100 m medley relay	3:35.40 (NR)	15	—N/a		did not advance	

Women

Athlete	Event	Heat		Semifinal		Final	
Athlete	Event	Time	Rank	Time	Rank	Time	Rank
Gritė Apanavičiūtė	50 m freestyle	26.43	58	did not advance			
Gritė Apanavičiūtė	100 m freestyle	58.70	81	did not advance			
Gritė Apanavičiūtė	50 m butterfly	28.38	62	did not advance			
Gritė Apanavičiūtė	100 m butterfly	1:03.38	67	did not advance			
Aistė Dobrovolskaitė	50 m freestyle	2:08.47	61	did not advance			
Aistė Dobrovolskaitė	50 m butterfly	28.62	65	did not advance			
Aistė Dobrovolskaitė	100 m butterfly	1:02.60 (NR)	61	did not advance			
Aistė Dobrovolskaitė	200 m butterfly	2:22.48	48	did not advance			
Aistė Dobrovolskaitė	200 m individual medley	2:24.35 (NR)	50	did not advance			
Raminta Dvariškytė	50 m breaststroke	32.53	44	did not advance			
Raminta Dvariškytė	100 m breaststroke	1:10.63 (NR)	44	did not advance			
Raminta Dvariškytė	200 m breaststroke	2:29.40	29				
Urtė Kazakevičiūtė	50 m breaststroke	32.37 (NR)	42	did not advance			
Urtė Kazakevičiūtė	100 m breaststroke	1:12.24	59	did not advance			
Urtė Kazakevičiūtė	200 m breaststroke	2:28.13 (NR)	25	did not advance			
Rugilė Mileišytė	50 m freestyle	26.48	60	did not advance			
Rugilė Mileišytė	100 m freestyle	57.30	62	did not advance			
Rugilė Mileišytė	50 m backstroke	29.58 (NR)	45	did not advance			
Rugilė Mileišytė; Gritė Apanavičiūtė; Raminta Dvariškytė; Aistė Dobrovolskaitė	4 × 100 m freestyle relay	3:54.97 (NR)	23	—N/a		did not advance	
Rugilė Mileišytė (1:02.72 - NR); Raminta Dvariškytė; Aistė Dobrovolskaitė; Gritė Apanavičiūtė	4 × 100 m medley relay	4:12.30 (NR)	22	—N/a		did not advance	
