= Lithuania at the 2015 World Aquatics Championships =

- Flag of Lithuania
- World Aquatics code: LTU
- National federation: Lietuvos plaukimo federacija
- Website: www.ltuswimming.com

in Kazan, Russia
- Competitors: 9 in 2 sports
- Medals Ranked 26th: Gold 0 Silver 1 Bronze 0 Total 1

World Aquatics Championships appearances (overview)
- 1994; 1998; 2001; 2003; 2005; 2007; 2009; 2011; 2013; 2015; 2017; 2019; 2022; 2023; 2024; 2025

Other related appearances
- Soviet Union (1973–1991)

Lithuania competed at the 2015 World Aquatics Championships in Kazan, Russia from 24 July to 9 August 2015.

== Medalists ==
| Medal | Name | Sport | Event | Date |
|---|---|---|---|---|
| Silver | Rūta Meilutytė | Swimming | Women's 100 m breaststroke | August 4 |

== Diving ==
Lithuanian divers qualified for the individual spots and the synchronized teams at the Worlds through the National Championships.

Women

| Athlete | Event | Preliminaries | | Semifinals | | Final | |
| Athlete | Event | Points | Rank | Points | Rank | Points | Rank |
|---|---|---|---|---|---|---|---|
| Indrė Girdauskaitė | 1 m springboard | 197.50 | 34 | —N/a | | did not advance | |
| Indrė Girdauskaitė | 3 m springboard | 214.55 | 42 | did not advance | | | |

== Swimming ==
Lithuanian swimmers have achieved qualifying standards in the following events (up to a maximum of 2 swimmers in each event at the A-standard entry time, and 1 at the B-standard):

Eight Lithuanian swimmers (six men and two women) have been selected to compete at the World Championships, including defending Olympic champion and world record holder Rūta Meilutytė.

Men

| Athlete | Event | Heat | | Semifinal | | Final | |
| Athlete | Event | Time | Rank | Time | Rank | Time | Rank |
|---|---|---|---|---|---|---|---|
| Simonas Bilis | 50 m freestyle | 22.51 | =20 | did not advance | | | |
| Tadas Duškinas | 50 m butterfly | 23.85 | 20 | did not advance | | | |
| Tadas Duškinas | 100 m butterfly | 54.76 | 49 | did not advance | | | |
| Danas Rapšys | 100 m backstroke | 54.86 | 28 | did not advance | | | |
| Danas Rapšys | 200 m backstroke | 1:59.00 | 19 | did not advance | | | |
| Mindaugas Sadauskas | 100 m freestyle | 49.49 | 27 | did not advance | | | |
| Povilas Strazdas | 200 m freestyle | 1:49.91 | 39 | did not advance | | | |
| Povilas Strazdas | 200 m individual medley | 2:03.67 | 28 | did not advance | | | |
| Giedrius Titenis | 50 m breaststroke | 27.51 | =15 Q | 27.20 NR | 8 Q | 27.23 | =5 |
| Giedrius Titenis | 100 m breaststroke | 59.84 | 8 Q | 58.96 NR | 3 Q | 59.56 | 6 |
| Giedrius Titenis | 200 m breaststroke | 2:11.11 | 16 Q | 2:10.45 | 11 | did not advance | |
| Simonas Bilis; Mindaugas Sadauskas; Povilas Strazdas; Tadas Duškinas | 4×100 m freestyle relay | 3:20.15 | 19 | —N/a | | did not advance | |
| Tadas Duškinas; Danas Rapšys; Mindaugas Sadauskas; Giedrius Titenis | 4×100 m medley relay | 3:35.30 | 12 | —N/a | | did not advance | |

Women

| Athlete | Event | Heat | | Semifinal | | Final | |
| Athlete | Event | Time | Rank | Time | Rank | Time | Rank |
|---|---|---|---|---|---|---|---|
| Raminta Dvariškytė | 200 m breaststroke | 2:31.74 | 32 | did not advance | | | |
| Rūta Meilutytė | 50 m breaststroke | 29.74 | 1 Q | 29.98 | 1 Q | 30.14 | 4 |
| Rūta Meilutytė | 100 m breaststroke | 1:06.75 | 4 Q | 1:05.64 | 2 Q | 1:06.36 | 2nd place, silver medalist(s) |
