= Lithuania at the 2013 World Aquatics Championships =

- Flag of Lithuania
- World Aquatics code: LTU
- National federation: Lietuvos plaukimo federacija
- Website: www.ltuswimming.com

in Barcelona, Spain
- Competitors: 11 in 2 sports
- Medals Ranked 14th: Gold 1 Silver 1 Bronze 0 Total 2

World Aquatics Championships appearances (overview)
- 1994; 1998; 2001; 2003; 2005; 2007; 2009; 2011; 2013; 2015; 2017; 2019; 2022; 2023; 2024; 2025

Other related appearances
- Soviet Union (1973–1991)

Lithuania competed at the 2013 World Aquatics Championships in Barcelona, Spain between 20 July to 4 August 2013.

== Medalists ==
Medal	Name	Sport	Event	Date
Gold	Rūta Meilutytė	Swimming	Women's 100 m breaststroke	30 July
Silver	Rūta Meilutytė	Swimming	Women's 50 m breaststroke	4 August

== Diving ==
Lithuania qualified 2 quota places for the following diving events.

Men

Athlete	Event	Preliminaries		Final	
Athlete	Event	Points	Rank	Points	Rank
Ignas Barkauskas	1 m springboard	212.90	43	Did not advance	
Sergej Baziuk	1 m springboard	246.30	40	Did not advance	

== Swimming ==
Lithuanian swimmers achieved qualifying standards and was selected by Lithuanian Swimming Federation in the following events (up to a maximum of 2 swimmers in each event at the A-standard entry time, and 1 at the B-standard):

Men

Athlete	Event	Heat		Semifinal		Final	
Athlete	Event	Time	Rank	Time	Rank	Time	Rank
Tadas Duškinas	50 m butterfly	24.15	30	Did not advance			
Tadas Duškinas	100 m butterfly	53.97	33	Did not advance			
Danas Rapšys	100 m backstroke	55.68	25	Did not advance			
Danas Rapšys	200 m backstroke	1:59.11	14 Q	1:59.05	14	Did not advance	
Mindaugas Sadauskas	50 m freestyle	22.69	26	Did not advance			
Mindaugas Sadauskas	100 m freestyle	49.91	=31	Did not advance			
Povilas Strazdas	200 m freestyle	1:50.86	37	Did not advance			
Povilas Strazdas	400 m freestyle	3:56.29	28	—		Did not advance	
Povilas Strazdas	400 m individual medley	4:29.05	32	—		Did not advance	
Giedrius Titenis	50 m breaststroke	27.93	29	Did not advance			
Giedrius Titenis	100 m breaststroke	1:00.44	16 Q	1:00.14	12	Did not advance	
Giedrius Titenis	200 m breaststroke	2:10.70	7 Q	2:10.17	11	Did not advance	
Tadas Duškinas; Danas Rapšys; Mindaugas Sadauskas; Giedrius Titenis	4×100 m medley relay	3:36.72	13	—		Did not advance	

Women

Athlete	Event	Heat		Semifinal		Final	
Athlete	Event	Time	Rank	Time	Rank	Time	Rank
Raminta Dvariškytė	200 m breaststroke	2:33.84	29	Did not advance			
Ugnė Mažutaitytė	200 m backstroke	2:14.41	26	Did not advance			
Rūta Meilutytė	50 m freestyle	DNS		Did not advance			
Rūta Meilutytė	100 m freestyle	55.72	27	Did not advance			
Rūta Meilutytė	50 m breaststroke	30.07	3 Q	29.48 WR	1 Q	29.59	2nd place, silver medalist(s)
Rūta Meilutytė	100 m breaststroke	1:04.52 EU	1 Q	1:04.35 WR	1 Q	1:04.42	1st place, gold medalist(s)
Jūratė Ščerbinskaitė	200 m freestyle	2:03.88	32	Did not advance			
