= Lithuania at the 2017 World Aquatics Championships =

- Flag of Lithuania
- World Aquatics code: LTU
- National federation: Lietuvos plaukimo federacija
- Website: www.ltuswimming.com

in Budapest, Hungary
- Competitors: 11 in 2 sports
- Medals: Gold 0 Silver 0 Bronze 0 Total 0

World Aquatics Championships appearances (overview)
- 1994; 1998; 2001; 2003; 2005; 2007; 2009; 2011; 2013; 2015; 2017; 2019; 2022; 2023; 2024; 2025

Other related appearances
- Soviet Union (1973–1991)

Lithuania competed at the 2017 World Aquatics Championships in Budapest, Hungary from 14 July to 30 July.

== Competitors ==
The following is the list of number of competitors participating at the Championships per discipline.

Sport	Men	Women	Total
Diving	0	2	2
Swimming	7	2	9
Total	7	4	11

== Diving ==
Lithuania has entered 2 female divers.

Women

Athlete	Event	Preliminaries		Semifinals		Final	
Athlete	Event	Points	Rank	Points	Rank	Points	Rank
Indre Girdauskaite	1 m springboard	193.85	38	—N/a		did not advance	
Genevieve Angerame	3 m springboard	220.95	34	did not advance			
Genevieve Angerame; Indre Girdauskaite	3 m synchronized springboard	226.53	18	—N/a		did not advance	

== Swimming ==
Lithuanian swimmers have achieved qualifying standards in the following events (up to a maximum of 2 swimmers in each event at the A-standard entry time, and 1 at the B-standard): Nine of them (seven men and two women) have been selected to compete at the World Championships, including freestyle sprinter and Rio 2016 top eight finalist Simonas Bilis and breaststroker and current world record holder Rūta Meilutytė.

Men

Athlete	Event	Heat		Semifinal		Final	
Athlete	Event	Time	Rank	Time	Rank	Time	Rank
Simonas Bilis	50 m freestyle	22.51	29	did not advance			
Simonas Bilis	100 m freestyle	49.83	43	did not advance			
Tadas Duškinas	50 m butterfly	24.10	30	did not advance			
Tadas Duškinas	100 m butterfly	53.97	=45	did not advance			
Deividas Margevičius	200 m butterfly	2:00.63 NR	31	did not advance			
Danas Rapšys	200 m freestyle	1:46.93 NR	10 Q	1:46.56 NR	10	did not advance	
Danas Rapšys	200 m backstroke	1:56.67 NR	3 Q	1:56.11 NR	8 Q	1:56.96	8
Andrius Šidlauskas	100 m breaststroke	59.91	15 Q	59.12	4 Q	59.21	6
Andrius Šidlauskas	200 m individual medley	2:03.25	28	did not advance			
Gytis Stankevičius	50 m backstroke	25.90	35	did not advance			
Gytis Stankevičius	100 m backstroke	55.80	=25	did not advance			
Giedrius Titenis	50 m breaststroke	27.24	11 Q	27.24	14	did not advance	
Giedrius Titenis	100 m breaststroke	59.79	12 Q	59.66	12	did not advance	
Giedrius Titenis	200 m breaststroke	2:12.37	21	did not advance			
Simonas Bilis; Deividas Margevičius; Danas Rapšys; Andrius Šidlauskas	4×100 m medley relay	3:36.75	17	—N/a		did not advance	

Women

Athlete	Event	Heat		Semifinal		Final	
Athlete	Event	Time	Rank	Time	Rank	Time	Rank
Ugnė Mažutaitytė	100 m backstroke	1:02.02 NR	27	did not advance			
Ugnė Mažutaitytė	200 m backstroke	2:14.07	22	did not advance			
Rūta Meilutytė	50 m freestyle	26.03	37	did not advance			
Rūta Meilutytė	50 m breaststroke	30.58	6 Q	30.40	4 Q	30.20	4
Rūta Meilutytė	100 m breaststroke	1:05.81	3 Q	1:05.06	3 Q	1:05.65	4
