= Lithuania at the 2007 World Aquatics Championships =

- Flag of Lithuania
- FINA code: LTU
- National federation: Lietuvos plaukimo federacija
- Website: www.ltuswimming.com

in Melbourne, Australia
- Competitors: 8 in 1 sports
- Medals: Gold 0 Silver 0 Bronze 0 Total 0

World Aquatics Championships appearances (overview)
- 1994; 1998; 2001; 2003; 2005; 2007; 2009; 2011; 2013; 2015; 2017; 2019; 2022; 2023; 2024

Other related appearances
- Soviet Union (1973–1991)

Lithuania competed at the 2007 World Aquatics Championships in Melbourne, Australia.

== Swimming ==
8 swimmers represented Lithuania:

Men

Athlete	Event	Heat		Semifinal		Final	
Athlete	Event	Time	Rank	Time	Rank	Time	Rank
Paulius Andrijauskas	100 m butterfly	55.25	51	Did not advance			
Paulius Andrijauskas	200 m butterfly	2:01.98 (NR)	31	Did not advance			
Paulius Andrijauskas	200 m individual medley	2:05.59	31	Did not advance			
Saulius Binevičius	200 m freestyle	1:52.22	47	Did not advance			
Edvinas Dautartas	50 m breaststroke	29.32	42	Did not advance			
Edvinas Dautartas	100 m breaststroke	1:03.07	38	Did not advance			
Edvinas Dautartas	200 m breaststroke	2:17.74	36	Did not advance			
Rolandas Gimbutis	50 m freestyle	23.00	28	Did not advance			
Rolandas Gimbutis	100 m freestyle	50.15	35	Did not advance			
Vytautas Janušaitis	50 m backstroke	26.34	18	Did not advance			
Vytautas Janušaitis	100 m backstroke	55.36 (NR)	12 Q	DNS			
Vytautas Janušaitis	200 m individual medley	2:00.21	7 Q	2:00.05	6 Q	1:59.84	7
Giedrius Titenis	50 m freestyle	23.97	31	Did not advance			
Giedrius Titenis	50 m breaststroke	28.82 (NR)	59	Did not advance			
Giedrius Titenis	100 m breaststroke	1:00.92 (NR)	4 Q	1:01.48	12	Did not advance	
Giedrius Titenis	200 m breaststroke	2:16.50	32	Did not advance			
Emilis Vaitkaitis	50 m butterfly	24.74	39	Did not advance			
Emilis Vaitkaitis	100 m butterfly	55.39	54	Did not advance			
Paulius Viktoravičius	100 m freestyle	49.98	28	Did not advance			
Rolandas Gimbutis; Saulius Binevičius; Paulius Viktoravičius; Vytautas Janušaitis	4 × 100 m freestyle relay	DSQ					
Vytautas Janušaitis; Saulius Binevičius; Paulius Andrijauskas; Paulius Viktoravičius	4 × 200 m freestyle relay	7:25.37 (NR)	18	—		Did not advance	
Vytautas Janušaitis; Giedrius Titenis; Paulius Andrijauskas; Paulius Viktoravičius	4 × 100 m medley relay	3:41.36 (NR)	14	—		Did not advance	
