= Lithuania at the 2005 World Aquatics Championships =

- Flag of Lithuania
- FINA code: LTU
- National federation: Lietuvos plaukimo federacija
- Website: www.ltuswimming.com

in Montreal, Quebec, Canada
- Competitors: 6 in 1 sports
- Medals: Gold 0 Silver 0 Bronze 0 Total 0

World Aquatics Championships appearances (overview)
- 1994; 1998; 2001; 2003; 2005; 2007; 2009; 2011; 2013; 2015; 2017; 2019; 2022; 2023; 2024

Other related appearances
- Soviet Union (1973–1991)

Lithuania competed at the 2005 World Aquatics Championships in Montreal, Quebec, Canada.

== Swimming ==
6 swimmers represented Lithuania:

Men

Athlete	Event	Heat		Semifinal		Final	
Athlete	Event	Time	Rank	Time	Rank	Time	Rank
Paulius Andrijauskas	200 m freestyle	1:51.48	34	did not advance			
Paulius Andrijauskas	200 m individual medley	2:04.77	18	did not advance			
Paulius Andrijauskas	400 m individual medley	4:29.25	20	—		did not advance	
Saulius Binevičius	100 m freestyle	50.59	32	did not advance			
Saulius Binevičius	200 m freestyle	1:53.15	46	did not advance			
Rolandas Gimbutis	50 m freestyle	22.79	23	did not advance			
Rolandas Gimbutis	100 m freestyle	49.73	16 Q	50.42	16	did not advance	
Vytautas Janušaitis	100 m backstroke	55.83	18	did not advance			
Vytautas Janušaitis	200 m individual medley	2:00.93	6 Q	1:59.72 (NR)	3 Q	2:00.78	6
Pavel Suškov	50 m backstroke	26.51	18	did not advance			
Pavel Suškov	100 m backstroke	56.50	25	did not advance			
Pavel Suškov	200 m backstroke	2:02.36	17	did not advance			
Pavel Suškov	200 m butterfly	2:02.77 (NR)	26	did not advance			
Paulius Viktoravičius	50 m freestyle	23.43	38	did not advance			
Paulius Viktoravičius	50 m butterfly	25.17	36	did not advance			
Paulius Viktoravičius; Vytautas Janušaitis; Saulius Binevičius; Rolandas Gimbutis	4 × 100 m freestyle relay	3:18.57 (NR)	5	—		3:17.89 (NR)	4
	4 × 200 m freestyle relay	7:30.57 (NR)	15	—		did not advance	
	4 × 100 m medley relay	3:46.74	12	—		did not advance	
