= Lithuania at the 2011 World Aquatics Championships =

- Flag of Lithuania
- FINA code: LTU
- National federation: Lietuvos plaukimo federacija
- Website: www.ltuswimming.com

in Shanghai, China
- Competitors: 7 in 2 sports
- Medals: Gold 0 Silver 0 Bronze 0 Total 0

World Aquatics Championships appearances (overview)
- 1994; 1998; 2001; 2003; 2005; 2007; 2009; 2011; 2013; 2015; 2017; 2019; 2022; 2023; 2024

Other related appearances
- Soviet Union (1973–1991)

Lithuania competed at the 2011 World Aquatics Championships in Shanghai, China between July 16 and 31, 2011.

== Diving ==
Lithuania has qualified 2 athletes in diving.

Men

| Athlete | Event | Preliminary | | Semifinals | | Final | |
| Athlete | Event | Points | Rank | Points | Rank | Points | Rank |
|---|---|---|---|---|---|---|---|
| Ignas Barkauskas | Men's 3m Springboard | 304.15 | 46 | did not advance | | | |
| Sergej Baziuk | Men's 3m Springboard | 301.20 | 47 | did not advance | | | |
| Ignas Barkauskas; Sergej Baziuk | Men's 3m Synchro Springboard | 301.77 | 17 | | | did not advance | |

== Swimming ==
Lithuania has qualified 5 athletes in swimming.

Men

| Athlete | Event | Preliminary | | Semifinals | | Final | |
| Athlete | Event | Time | Rank | Time | Rank | Time | Rank |
|---|---|---|---|---|---|---|---|
| Mindaugas Sadauskas | Men's 50m Freestyle | 22.95 | 34 | did not advance | | | |
| Mindaugas Sadauskas | Men's 100m Freestyle | 49.66 | 29 | did not advance | | | |
| Matas Andriekus | 100 m backstroke | 56.10 | 39 | did not advance | | | |
| Giedrius Titenis | Men's 50 m Breaststroke | 28.14 | 19 | did not advance | | | |
| Giedrius Titenis | Men's 100 m Breaststroke | 1:00.41 | 10Q | 1:00.26 | 8Q | 1:00.25 | 6 |
| Giedrius Titenis | Men's 200 m Breaststroke | 2:10.33 | 1Q | 2:11.43 | 8Q | 2:11.07 | 6 |
| Vytautas Janušaitis | Men's 100m Butterfly | 53.50 | 31 | did not advance | | | |
| Vytautas Janušaitis | Men's 200m IM | 1:59.43 | 7Q | 1:59.51 | 10 | did not advance | |
| Matas Andriekus; Giedrius Titenis; Vytautas Janušaitis; Mindaugas Sadauskas | Men's 4 × 100 m Medley Relay | 3:38.57 | 17 | | | did not advance | |

Women

| Athlete | Event | Preliminary | | Semifinals | | Final | |
| Athlete | Event | Time | Rank | Time | Rank | Time | Rank |
|---|---|---|---|---|---|---|---|
| Raminta Dvariškytė | Women's 200 m Breaststroke | 2.33.79 | 27 | did not advance | | | |
