= Lithuania at the World Aquatics Championships =

- Flag of Lithuania
- World Aquatics code: LTU
- National federation: LTU Aquatics
- Website: ltuaquatics.com
- Medals Ranked 26th: Gold 6 Silver 3 Bronze 3 Total 12

World Aquatics Championships appearances (overview)
- 1994; 1998; 2001; 2003; 2005; 2007; 2009; 2011; 2013; 2015; 2017; 2019; 2022; 2023; 2024; 2025

Other related appearances
- Soviet Union (1973–1991)

Lithuania has sent athletes to every World Aquatics Championships since country's national federation, which was founded in 1924 but was closed due Soviet Union, was restored in 1991 and recognized by FINA in 1992.

== List of medalists ==
Medal	Name	Championships	Sport	Event
Bronze	Raimundas Mažuolis	(Italy) 1994 Rome	Swimming	Men's 50 m freestyle
Bronze	Giedrius Titenis	(Italy) 2009 Rome	Swimming	Men's 200 m breaststroke
Gold	Rūta Meilutytė	(Spain) 2013 Barcelona	Swimming	Women's 100 m breaststroke
Silver	Rūta Meilutytė	(Spain) 2013 Barcelona	Swimming	Women's 50 m breaststroke
Silver	Rūta Meilutytė	(Russia) 2015 Kazan	Swimming	Women's 100 m breaststroke
Gold	Rūta Meilutytė	(Hungary) 2022 Budapest	Swimming	Women's 50 m breaststroke
Bronze	Rūta Meilutytė	(Hungary) 2022 Budapest	Swimming	Women's 100 m breaststroke
Gold	Rūta Meilutytė	(Japan) 2023 Fukuoka	Swimming	Women's 50 m breaststroke
Gold	Rūta Meilutytė	(Japan) 2023 Fukuoka	Swimming	Women's 100 m breaststroke
Gold	Rūta Meilutytė	(Qatar) 2024 Doha	Swimming	Women's 50 m breaststroke
Silver	Danas Rapšys	(Qatar) 2024 Doha	Swimming	Men's 200 m freestyle
Gold	Rūta Meilutytė	2025 Singapore	Swimming	Women's 50 m breaststroke

== Participation table ==
Championships	Athletes	Athletes by sport			Medals			Place
Championships	Athletes	Swimming	Diving	Artistic swimming	1st place, gold medalist(s)	2nd place, silver medalist(s)	3rd place, bronze medalist(s)	Place
(Italy) 1994 Rome	7	7	—	—	0	0	1	20th
(Australia) 1998 Perth	2	2	—	—	0	0	0	—
(Japan) 2001 Fukuoka	4	4	—	—	0	0	0	—
(Spain) 2003 Barcelona	8	8	—	—	0	0	0	—
(Canada) 2005 Montreal	6	6	—	—	0	0	0	—
(Australia) 2007 Melbourne	8	8	—	—	0	0	0	—
(Italy) 2009 Rome	14	12	2	—	0	0	1	24th
(China) 2011 Shanghai	7	5	2	—	0	0	0	—
(Spain) 2013 Barcelona	11	9	2	—	1	1	0	14th
(Russia) 2015 Kazan	9	8	1	—	0	1	0	26th
(Hungary) 2017 Budapest	11	9	2	—	0	0	0	—
(South Korea) 2019 Gwangju	10	8	1	1	0	0	0	—
(Hungary) 2022 Budapest	8	7	1	—	1	0	1	16th
(Japan) 2023 Fukuoka	9	7	2	—	2	0	0	8th
(Qatar) 2024 Doha	15	13	2	—	1	1	0	22nd
2025 Singapore	13	11	2	—	1	0	0	19th
Overall					6	3	3	26th
