= Giedrius Andriunaitis =

Lithuanian swimmer

Personal information
- Full name: Giedrius Andriunaitis
- Nickname: "G"
- National team: Lithuania
- Born: June 16, 1991 (age 35) Kaunas, Lithuania
- Height: 6 ft 5 in (1.96 m)
- Weight: 210 lb (95 kg)

Sport
- Sport: Swimming
- Strokes: freestyle
- Club: Kauno Plaukimo Mokykla
- College team: Southern Methodist University
Medal record
Men's swimming
Representing Lithuania
Event	1st	2nd	3rd
Lithuania Championships (LC)	5	5	2
Lithuania Championships (SC)	1	1	1
Baltic States Championships	0	1	0
Conference USA (SCY)	2	2	0
Lithuania Junior Championships	3	0	1
Total	11	9	4
Lithuania Championships (LC)
Silver medal – second place	2013 Kaunas	4x100 freestyle
Gold medal – first place	2012 Alytus	4x100 medley
Bronze medal – third place	2012 Alytus	4x100 freestyle
Silver medal – second place	2011 Alytus	4x100 freestyle
Bronze medal – third place	2011 Alytus	100 freestyle
Gold medal – first place	2010 Alytus	4x100 freestyle
Gold medal – first place	2010 Alytus	4x100 medley
Silver medal – second place	2009 Alytus	4x100 freestyle
Silver medal – second place	2009 Alytus	4x200 freestyle
Open Winter Lithuania Championships (LC)
Gold medal – first place	2010 Alytus	4x100 freestyle
Silver medal – second place	2010 Alytus	4x100 medley
Gold medal – first place	2009 Alytus	4x100 freestyle
Baltic States Championships (LC)
Silver medal – second place	2010 Tartu	4x100 freestyle
Lithuanian Championships (SC)
Gold medal – first place	2009 Anyksciai	4x50 medley
Silver medal – second place	2009 Anyksciai	4x50 freestyle
Bronze medal – third place	2009 Anyksciai	100 freestyle
Conference USA (SCY)
Gold medal – first place	2011 Houston	4x100 freestyle
Silver medal – second place	2011 Houston	4x50 freestyle
Silver medal – second place	2011 Houston	4x200 freestyle
Gold medal – first place	2012 Houston	4x200 freestyle
Lithuania Junior Championships (LC)
Gold medal – first place	2009 Alytus	100 free
Gold medal – first place	2009 Alytus	4x100 freestyle
Gold medal – first place	2009 Alytus	4x100 medley
Bronze medal – third place	2009 Alytus	50 freestyle

Giedrius Andriunaitis (born June 16, 1991) is a Lithuanian swimmer who specialized in sprint freestyle events. He is a multiple Lithuanian champion, who represented his country at 2009 European Junior Swimming Championships, in Prague. Andriunaitis also participated at LEN European Championships in 2010, and 2011 Summer Universiade, and other international competitions over the world. Andriunaitis was a member of the swimming team for SMU Mustangs at the Southern Methodist University in Dallas, Texas. Andriunaitis was a significant contributor to the mustangs in winning Conference USA titles.

== Personal life ==
Andriunaitis was born in Kaunas, Lithuania, on 16 June 1991, the son of Edmundas and Vida. Has a sister Indre. He attended Ažuolas Catholic Secondary School in Kaunas City. After graduating from high school, Andriunaitis, moved to the U.S. and represented Southern Methodist University and SMU Mustangs for four years. He received Bachelors of Business Administration degree in Finance from Southern Methodist University in 2014. Currently, Andriunaitis is attending Texas A&M University - Commerce where he is pursuing Masters of Science degree in Business Analytics. He is an active member of Dallas Aquatic Masters Swim Club and U.S. Masters Swimming.

== Career ==
=== 2009 ===
In 2009, Andriunaitis became a Lithuanian Junior champion in the 100 meters Freestyle clocking 0:51:98 sec. This result allowed him to qualify for European Junior Championships in Prague, Czech Republic. However, Andriunaitis failed to advance into the semifinals at the Europeans, as he placed fifty-seventh overall out of seventy-seven swimmers in the prelims. Andriunaitis in the men's 400 m Medley relay, along with his teammates Matas Andriekus, Vaidotas Blažys, and Eimantas Vijaikis, posted a time of 3:50.97 and ended up in the 17th place beating six countries.

At the 2009 Lithuanian Short Course Championships in the 100 meter Freestyle, Andriunaitis, posted a personal best time of 0:50:39 sec. and took third place behind Olympians Mindaugas Sadauskas and Paulius Viktoravičius. Also, Andriunaitis helped his team, made of Vytautas Janušaitis, Vaidotas Blažys, and Rimvydas Šalčius, to win 4x50 m Medley relay. Andriunaitis posted a sixth all-time relay split for the age group in Lithuania.

=== 2010-2011 ===
In 2010, Andriunaitis made a debut at the LEN European Championships. He swam as a last leg for Lithuanians in the 4 × 100 m Freestyle relay and touched the wall in the 11th place. Individually, Andriunaitis placed 58th for the 50 m and 100 m Freestyle events.

In the 2011 Conference USA Championships Andriunaitis, along with David Larsson, Mindaugas Sadauskas and Blaz Korosec, helped lead the 400-yard Freestyle relay to a first-place finish with an NCAA time of 2:56.37. Andriunaitis also took part in earning runner-up honors with season-best performances in both the 200 yard Medley relay and the 800 yard Freestyle relay. The team earned NCAA consideration in both events.

Andriunaitis represented Lithuania and Southern Methodist University at the XXVI Universiade Games in Shenzhen, China. He posted a time of 0:24:33 sec. and took 39th place in the 50 m Freestyle event.

=== 2012 ===
In 2012 at the Conference USA Houston, Texas, Andriunaitis with Nicolai Hansen, Matt Roney, and Blaz Korosec touched the wall in 6:32.80 (NCAA B) and won the 800-yard Freestyle relay.

At the 2012 Lithuanian National Championship, Andriunaitis represented Kauno Plaukimo Mokykla and took gold in the 4 × 100 m Medley relay. In the individual events, Andriunaitis finished 4th in the 100 m Freestyle and was short by 1 sec. from the Olympian and 2016 NCAA Champion Simonas Bilis. Andriunaitis placed 5th in the 50 m Freestyle just 0.16 of a second behind closest competitor, NCAA team member for Arizona State University - Tadas Duškinas.

== Personal Best Times ==
Long Course
Event	Time	Meet
50 m Freestyle	00:24:01	2011 Lithuanian National Swimming Championships
100 m Freestyle	00:51:98	2009 Lithuanian Junior Championships

Short Course
Event	Time	Meet
50 m Freestyle	00:23:50	2009 Lithuanian Short Course Championships
100 m Freestyle	00:50:39	2009 Lithuanian Short Course Championships

Short Course Yards
Event	Time	Meet
50 Yard Freestyle	00:20:88	2011 Conference USA Championships
100 Yard Freestyle	00:45:35	2011 Conference USA Championships
200 Yard Freestyle	1:40:26	2013 Conference USA Championships
