= Lithuania at the 2019 World Aquatics Championships =

- Flag of Lithuania
- FINA code: LTU
- National federation: Swimming Federation of Lithuania
- Website: ltuswimming.com

in Gwangju, South Korea
- Competitors: 10 in 3 sports

World Aquatics Championships appearances (overview)
- 1994; 1998; 2001; 2003; 2005; 2007; 2009; 2011; 2013; 2015; 2017; 2019; 2022; 2023; 2024

Other related appearances
- Soviet Union (1973–1991)

Lithuania competed at the 2019 World Aquatics Championships in Gwangju, South Korea from 12 to 28 July.

== Artistic swimming ==
Lithuania entered 1 female swimmer. It will mark countries debut in this discipline.

Women

Athlete	Event	Preliminaries		Final	
Athlete	Event	Points	Rank	Points	Rank
Natalija Ambrazaitė	Solo technical routine	69.8135	24	did not advance	
Natalija Ambrazaitė	Solo free routine	73.8000	27	did not advance	

== Diving ==
Lithuania entered 1 female diver.

Women

Athlete	Event	Preliminaries		Semifinals		Final	
Athlete	Event	Points	Rank	Points	Rank	Points	Rank
Indrė Girdauskaitė	1 m springboard	156.40	40	—		did not advance	
Indrė Girdauskaitė	3 m springboard	157.05	48	did not advance			

== Swimming ==
Lithuania entered 2 female and 6 male swimmers.

Men

Athlete	Event	Heat		Semifinal		Final	
Athlete	Event	Time	Rank	Time	Rank	Time	Rank
Simonas Bilis	50 m freestyle	22.33	=21	did not advance			
Simonas Bilis	100 m freestyle	48.90	21	did not advance			
Tadas Duškinas	50 m butterfly	24.02	34	did not advance			
Deividas Margevičius	100 m butterfly	52.55 NR	18	did not advance			
Danas Rapšys	200 m freestyle	1:46.60	9 Q	1:45.44	3 Q	DSQ	
Danas Rapšys	400 m freestyle	3:44.31	2 Q	—		3:43.50	4
Danas Rapšys	200 m backstroke	1:58.04	=14 Q	1:58.29	15	did not advance	
Andrius Šidlauskas	100 m breaststroke	59.75	16 Q	59.66	14	did not advance	
Andrius Šidlauskas	200 m breaststroke	2:10.77	20	did not advance			
Andrius Šidlauskas	200 m individual medley	2:02.50	30	did not advance			
Giedrius Titenis	50 m breaststroke	27.67	=25	did not advance			
Giedrius Titenis	100 m breaststroke	1:00.20	21	did not advance			
Giedrius Titenis	200 m breaststroke	2:10.65	18	did not advance			
Danas Rapšys; Andrius Šidlauskas; Deividas Margevičius; Simonas Bilis	4 × 100 m medley relay	3:34.88	11	—		did not advance	

Women

Athlete	Event	Heat		Semifinal		Final	
Athlete	Event	Time	Rank	Time	Rank	Time	Rank
Ugnė Mažutaitytė	200 m backstroke	2:14.46	29	did not advance			
Kotryna Teterevkova	50 m breaststroke	31.53	20	did not advance			
Kotryna Teterevkova	100 m breaststroke	1:08.64	=22	did not advance			
Kotryna Teterevkova	200 m breaststroke	2:29.93	22	did not advance			

Mixed

Athlete	Event	Heat		Final	
Athlete	Event	Time	Rank	Time	Rank
Ugnė Mažutaitytė; Kotryna Teterevkova; Deividas Margevičius; Tadas Duškinas	4 × 100 m medley relay	3:53.38	18	did not advance	
