= Lithuania at the 2001 World Aquatics Championships =

- Flag of Lithuania
- FINA code: LTU
- National federation: Lietuvos plaukimo federacija
- Website: www.ltuswimming.com

in Fukuoka, Japan
- Competitors: 4 in 1 sports
- Medals: Gold 0 Silver 0 Bronze 0 Total 0

World Aquatics Championships appearances (overview)
- 1994; 1998; 2001; 2003; 2005; 2007; 2009; 2011; 2013; 2015; 2017; 2019; 2022; 2023; 2024

Other related appearances
- Soviet Union (1973–1991)

Lithuania competed at the 2001 World Aquatics Championships in Fukuoka, Japan.

== Swimming ==
4 swimmers represented Lithuania:

Men

Athlete	Event	Heat		Semifinal		Final	
Athlete	Event	Time	Rank	Time	Rank	Time	Rank
Saulius Binevičius	100 m freestyle	51.97	37	did not advance			
Saulius Binevičius	200 m freestyle	1:52.56	25	did not advance			
Rolandas Gimbutis	50 m freestyle	23.08	31	did not advance			
Rolandas Gimbutis	100 m freestyle	50.65	22	did not advance			
Rolandas Gimbutis	50 m butterfly	25.27	39	did not advance			
Darius Grigalionis	50 m backstroke	25.97	6 Q	26.08	12	did not advance	
Darius Grigalionis	100 m backstroke	56.77	23	did not advance			
Mindaugas Špokas	50 m backstroke	26.59	29	did not advance			
Mindaugas Špokas	100 m backstroke	58.00	31	did not advance			
