= Swimming at the 2005 World Aquatics Championships – Men's 200 metre individual medley =

Men's 200m I.M. at the 2005 FINA World Aquatics Championships
- Dates: 27 July (prelims and semifinals); 28 July (final)
- Competitors: 61 from 50 nations
- Winning time: 1 minute 56.68 seconds

Medalists
gold medal	Michael Phelps	United States
silver medal	László Cseh	Hungary
bronze medal	Ryan Lochte	United States

The Men's 200 Individual Medley (or I.M.) event at the 2005 FINA World Aquatics Championships was swum 27 – 28 July 2005 in Montreal, Quebec, Canada. Preliminary and Semifinal heats were 27 July; the Final 28 July. The top-16 swimmers from the Prelims in the morning advanced to the 1 of 2 Seminfinal in the evening; the top-8 swimmers from the Semifinals then advanced to the Final the next evening.

As the Swimming portion of the World Championships are swum in a long course (50m) pool, this race consisted of 4 lengths. As it was an IM event, each length was a different stroke, swum in the order of: butterfly, backstroke, breaststroke and then freestyle.

At the start of the event, the existing World (WR) and Championships (CR) records were:

- WR: 1:55.94, Michael Phelps (USA), swum 9 August 2003 in College Park, USA;
- CR: 1:56.04, Michael Phelps (USA), swum 25 July 2003 in Barcelona, Spain.

No new world or competition records were set during this competition.

== Results ==
=== Final ===
Place	Swimmer	Nation	Time	Notes
1	Michael Phelps	USA	1:56.68	
2	László Cseh	Hungary	1:57.61	
3	Ryan Lochte	USA	1:57.79	
4	Alessio Boggiatto	Italy	2:00.28	
5	Hidemasa Sano	Japan	2:00.70	
6	Vytautas Janušaitis	Lithuania	2:00.78	
7	Igor Berezutsky	Russia	2:01.43	
8	Dean Kent	New Zealand	2:01.81	

=== Semifinals ===
Rank	Heat+Lane	Swimmer	Nation	Time	Notes
1	S1 L5	Ryan Lochte	USA	1:58.06	q
2	S2 L5	Michael Phelps	USA	1:58.36	q
3	S1 L3	Vytautas Janušaitis	Lithuania	1:59.72	q
4	S2 L4	László Cseh	Hungary	2:00.12	q
5	S2 L3	Hidemasa Sano	Japan	2:00.45	q
6	S1 L4	Alessio Boggiatto	Italy	2:00.52	q
7	S1 L6	Igor Berezutsky	Russia	2:01.11	q
8	S2 L2	Dean Kent	New Zealand	2:01.55	q
9	S1 L2	Adam Lucas	Australia	2:01.99	
10	S2 L7	Leith Brodie	Australia	2:02.28	
11	S2 L8	Mihail Alexandrov	Bulgaria	2:02.32	
12	S2 L6	Jiro Miki	Japan	2:02.49	
13	S1 L7	Bradley Ally	Barbados	2:02.53	
14	S2 L1	Robin van Aggele	Netherlands	2:02.98	
15	S1 L8	Keith Beavers	Canada	2:03.27	
16	S1 L1	Ioannis Kokkodis	Greece	2:04.15	

=== Preliminary heats ===
Rank	Heat+Lane	Swimmer	Nation	Time	Notes
1	H6 L4	László Cseh	Hungary	1:59.56	q
2	H7 L5	Alessio Boggiatto	Italy	2:00.24	q
3	H8 L4	Michael Phelps	United States	2:00.30	q
4	H7 L4	Ryan Lochte	United States	2:00.51	q
5	H6 L5	Hidemasa Sano	Japan	2:00.61	q
6	H8 L5	Vytautas Janušaitis	Lithuania	2:00.93	q
7	H8 L6	Jiro Miki	Japan	2:02.04	q
8	H8 L2	Igor Berezutsky	Russia	2:02.30	q
9	H6 L3	Dean Kent	New Zealand	2:02.35	q
10	H8 L3	Adam Lucas	Australia	2:02.45	q
11	H6 L6	Leith Brodie	Australia	2:02.73	q
12	H7 L7	Bradley Ally	Barbados	2:02.83	q
13	H8 L7	Robin van Aggele	Netherlands	2:03.48	q
14	H7 L6	Ioannis Kokkodis	Greece	2:03.77	q
15	H6 L2	Mihail Alexandrov	Bulgaria	2:04.50	q
16	H7 L2	Keith Beavers	Canada	2:04.54	q
17	H6 L8	Miguel Molina	Philippines	2:04.68	
18	H5 L5	Paulius Andrijauskas	Lithuania	2:04.77	
19	H5 L2	Gard Kvale	Norway	2:04.93	
20	H7 L8	Jacob Carstensen	Denmark	2:04.97	
21	H5 L1	Dmitriy Gordiyenko	Kazakhstan	2:05.17	
22	H8 L8	Dmytro Nazarenko	Ukraine	2:05.19	
23	H6 L1	Sebastian Stoss	Austria	2:05.91	
24	H3 L4	Shaune Fraser	Cayman Islands	2:06.05	
25	H5 L6	Hocine Haciane	Andorra	2:06.16	
26	H8 L1	Nicolas Rostoucher	France	2:06.56	
27	H5 L3	Dzianis Silkov	Belarus	2:06.79	
28	H7 L1	Guntars Deicmans	Latvia	2:07.03	
29	H5 L7	Andrei Zaharov	Moldova	2:07.84	
30	H4 L4	Oleg Pukhnatiy	Uzbekistan	2:08.97	
31	H4 L6	M. Akbar Nasution	Indonesia	2:09.16	
32	H4 L2	Yury Zaharov	Kyrgyzstan	2:09.90	
33	H7 L3	Peng Wu	China	2:10.52	
34	H5 L4	Kuo-Chuan Tsai	Chinese Taipei	2:10.64	
35	H5 L8	Gary Tan	Singapore	2:11.11	
36	H4 L8	Vasilii Danilov	Kyrgyzstan	2:11.45	
37	H3 L3	Mohamad Al-Naser	Kuwait	2:11.64	
38	H4 L3	Mark Chay	Singapore	2:13.10	
39	H3 L6	Francisco Montenegro	Guatemala	2:13.28	
40	H2 L5	James Walsh	Philippines	2:13.52	
41	H3 L7	Graham Smith	Bermuda	2:14.03	
42	H4 L5	Yu-An Lin	Chinese Taipei	2:14.06	
43	H2 L3	Shahin Baradaran	Iran	2:14.96	
44	H2 L4	Morgan Locke	Virgin Islands	2:15.30	
45	H3 L2	Youssef Hafdi	Morocco	2:15.65	
46	H2 L7	Rony Bakale	Republic of the Congo	2:15.85	
47	H3 L8	Khaly Ciss	Senegal	2:17.11	
48	H2 L6	Johnny Castillo	Panama	2:18.02	
49	H3 L1	Francois Ghattas	Lebanon	2:19.47	
50	H1 L5	Reginaldo Panting	Honduras	2:20.13	
51	H1 L3	Amar Shah	Kenya	2:20.15	
52	H2 L2	Joel Refos	Suriname	2:21.10	
53	H2 L8	Diego Foianini	Bolivia	2:21.13	
54	H2 L1	Fernando Medrano	Nicaragua	2:25.05	
55	H1 L4	Chisela Kanchela	Zambia	2:26.11	
56	H1 L6	Joseph Kimani	Kenya	2:31.02	
57	H1 L7	Hassan Shah	Maldives	2:58.27	
-	H4 L1	Aleksander Hetland	Norway	DQ	
-	H1 L2	Alain Brigion-Tobe	Cameroon	DNS	
-	H3 L5	Ahmed Salah	Egypt	DNS	
-	H6 L7	Ioannis Drymonakos	Greece	DNS	
