= Swimming at the 2023 World Aquatics Championships – Women's 200 metre breaststroke =

Women's 200 metre breaststroke at the 2023 World Aquatics Championships
- Venue: Marine Messe Fukuoka
- Location: Fukuoka, Japan
- Dates: 27 July (heats and semifinals); 28 July (final)
- Competitors: 37 from 35 nations
- Winning time: 2:20.80

Medalists
| gold medal | Tatjana Schoenmaker | South Africa |
| silver medal | Kate Douglass | United States |
| bronze medal | Tes Schouten | Netherlands |

The women's 200 metre breaststroke competition at the 2023 World Aquatics Championships was held on 27 and 28 July 2023.

== Records ==
Prior to the competition, the existing world and championship records were as follows.

| World record | Evgeniia Chikunova (RUS) | 2:17.55 | Kazan, Russia | 21 April 2023 |
| Competition record | Rikke Møller Pedersen (DEN) | 2:19.11 | Barcelona, Spain | 1 August 2013 |

== Results ==
=== Heats ===
The heats were started on 27 July at 11:11.

| Rank | Heat | Lane | Name | Nationality | Time | Notes |
|---|---|---|---|---|---|---|
| 1 | 2 | 4 | Tes Schouten | Netherlands | 2:22.43 | Q |
| 2 | 4 | 5 | Tatjana Schoenmaker | South Africa | 2:22.92 | Q |
| 3 | 2 | 5 | Thea Blomsterberg | Denmark | 2:23.41 | Q |
| 4 | 4 | 4 | Lilly King | United States | 2:23.68 | Q |
| 5 | 4 | 6 | Kotryna Teterevkova | Lithuania | 2:24.87 | Q |
| 6 | 2 | 6 | Abbey Harkin | Australia | 2:25.11 | Q |
| 7 | 2 | 7 | Gabrielle Assis | Brazil | 2:25.18 | Q, NR |
| 8 | 4 | 3 | Runa Imai | Japan | 2:25.27 | Q |
| 9 | 3 | 4 | Kate Douglass | United States | 2:25.50 | Q |
| 10 | 3 | 6 | Kelsey Wog | Canada | 2:25.60 | Q |
| 11 | 3 | 5 | Ye Shiwen | China | 2:25.93 | Q |
| 12 | 4 | 2 | Sophie Hansson | Sweden | 2:26.01 | Q |
| 13 | 2 | 3 | Martina Carraro | Italy | 2:26.10 | Q |
| 14 | 2 | 8 | Macarena Ceballos | Argentina | 2:26.18 | Q |
| 15 | 3 | 3 | Lisa Mamié | Switzerland | 2:26.55 | Q |
| 16 | 3 | 7 | Mona McSharry | Ireland | 2:26.59 | Q |
| 17 | 2 | 1 | Ana Blažević | Croatia | 2:26.60 | |
| 18 | 3 | 1 | Jessica Vall | Spain | 2:26.88 | |
| 19 | 2 | 2 | Kara Hanlon | Great Britain | 2:27.16 | |
| 20 | 4 | 7 | Charlotte Bonnet | France | 2:27.47 | |
| 21 | 4 | 8 | Eneli Jefimova | Estonia | 2:27.60 | |
| 22 | 4 | 9 | Letitia Sim | Singapore | 2:27.73 | NR |
| 23 | 3 | 8 | Kwon Se-hyun | South Korea | 2:27.93 | |
| 24 | 2 | 0 | Eleni Kontogeorgou | Greece | 2:30.46 | |
| 25 | 3 | 0 | Melissa Rodríguez | Mexico | 2:30.57 | |
| 26 | 3 | 9 | Phiangkhwan Pawapotako | Thailand | 2:35.12 | |
| 27 | 4 | 0 | Laura Lahtinen | Finland | 2:35.16 | |
| 28 | 1 | 7 | Aminata Barrow | Gambia | 2:37.01 | NR |
| 29 | 2 | 9 | Nadia Tudo Cubells | Andorra | 2:38.12 | |
| 30 | 1 | 4 | Valerie Tarazi | Palestine | 2:38.88 | |
| 31 | 1 | 2 | Jayla Pina | Cape Verde | 2:41.75 | NR |
| 32 | 1 | 5 | Malak Meqdar | Morocco | 2:43.42 | |
| 33 | 1 | 1 | Tara Aloul | Jordan | 2:44.88 | NR |
| 34 | 1 | 3 | Ramudi Samarakoon | Sri Lanka | 2:45.61 | |
| 35 | 1 | 6 | Kelera Madunasoko | Fiji | 2:46.09 | |
| | 3 | 2 | Anna Elendt | Germany | Did not start | |
| | 4 | 1 | Lisa Angiolini | Italy | Did not start | |

=== Semifinals ===
The semifinals were held on 27 July at 21:19.

| Rank | Heat | Lane | Name | Nationality | Time | Notes |
|---|---|---|---|---|---|---|
| 1 | 1 | 4 | Tatjana Schoenmaker | South Africa | 2:21.31 | Q |
| 2 | 2 | 4 | Tes Schouten | Netherlands | 2:21.71 | Q, =NR |
| 3 | 2 | 2 | Kate Douglass | United States | 2:21.99 | Q |
| 4 | 1 | 5 | Lilly King | United States | 2:22.68 | Q |
| 5 | 2 | 5 | Thea Blomsterberg | Denmark | 2:23.19 | Q |
| 6 | 1 | 3 | Abbey Harkin | Australia | 2:23.65 | Q |
| 7 | 2 | 3 | Kotryna Teterevkova | Lithuania | 2:24.12 | Q |
| 8 | 1 | 2 | Kelsey Wog | Canada | 2:24.16 | Q |
| 9 | 1 | 6 | Runa Imai | Japan | 2:24.68 | |
| 10 | 2 | 7 | Ye Shiwen | China | 2:24.76 | |
| 11 | 2 | 8 | Lisa Mamié | Switzerland | 2:24.84 | |
| 12 | 2 | 6 | Gabrielle Assis | Brazil | 2:25.56 | |
| 13 | 1 | 7 | Sophie Hansson | Sweden | 2:25.63 | |
| 14 | 2 | 1 | Martina Carraro | Italy | 2:25.76 | |
| 15 | 1 | 8 | Mona McSharry | Ireland | 2:26.27 | |
| 16 | 1 | 1 | Macarena Ceballos | Argentina | 2:26.68 | |

=== Final ===
The final was started on 28 July at 20:49.

| Rank | Lane | Name | Nationality | Time | Notes |
|---|---|---|---|---|---|
| 1st place, gold medalist(s) | 4 | Tatjana Schoenmaker | South Africa | 2:20.80 | |
| 2nd place, silver medalist(s) | 3 | Kate Douglass | United States | 2:21.23 | |
| 3rd place, bronze medalist(s) | 5 | Tes Schouten | Netherlands | 2:21.63 | NR |
| 4 | 6 | Lilly King | United States | 2:22.25 | |
| 5 | 2 | Thea Blomsterberg | Denmark | 2:22.42 | |
| 6 | 1 | Kotryna Teterevkova | Lithuania | 2:24.22 | |
| 7 | 7 | Abbey Harkin | Australia | 2:24.55 | |
| 8 | 8 | Kelsey Wog | Canada | 2:25.21 | |
