= Swimming at the 2023 World Aquatics Championships – Women's 100 metre breaststroke =

Women's 100-metre breaststroke at the 2023 World Aquatics Championships
- Venue: Marine Messe Fukuoka
- Location: Fukuoka, Japan
- Dates: 24 July (heats and semi-finals); 25 July (final)
- Competitors: 57 from 51 nations
- Winning time: 1:04.62

Medalists
gold medal	Rūta Meilutytė	Lithuania
silver medal	Tatjana Schoenmaker	South Africa
bronze medal	Lydia Jacoby	United States

The women's 100-metre breaststroke competition at the 2023 World Aquatics Championships was held on 24 and 25 July 2023.

== Records ==
Prior to the competition, the existing world and championship records were as follows.

World record	Lilly King (USA)	1:04.13	Budapest, Hungary	25 July 2017
Competition record	Lilly King (USA)	1:04.13	Budapest, Hungary	25 July 2017

== Results ==
=== Heats ===
The heats were started on 24 July at 11:09.

Rank	Heat	Lane	Name	Nationality	Time	Notes
1	6	6	Rūta Meilutytė	Lithuania	1:04.67	Q
2	5	6	Mona McSharry	Ireland	1:05.55	Q, NR
3	6	3	Tatjana Schoenmaker	South Africa	1:05.56	Q
4	6	4	Lilly King	United States	1:05.93	Q
5	4	7	Satomi Suzuki	Japan	1:06.20	Q
6	4	3	Lisa Angiolini	Italy	1:06.28	Q
7	5	1	Dominika Sztandera	Poland	1:06.42	Q, NR
8	4	5	Tes Schouten	Netherlands	1:06.46	Q
9	6	2	Eneli Jefimova	Estonia	1:06.54	Q
10	4	4	Reona Aoki	Japan	1:06.61	Q
11	5	2	Martina Carraro	Italy	1:06.63	Q
12	4	6	Sophie Hansson	Sweden	1:06.69	Q
12	6	8	Macarena Ceballos	Argentina	1:06.69	Q, SA
14	5	4	Lydia Jacoby	United States	1:06.71	Q
15	6	1	Abbey Harkin	Australia	1:06.86	Q
16	4	8	Lisa Mamié	Switzerland	1:06.87	Q
17	4	2	Kotryna Teterevkova	Lithuania	1:06.96	
18	6	5	Lara van Niekerk	South Africa	1:07.03	
19	5	5	Anna Elendt	Germany	1:07.09	
20	5	3	Tang Qianting	China	1:07.15	
21	5	8	Yang Chang	China	1:07.28	
22	6	0	Sophie Angus	Canada	1:07.34	
23	5	7	Kara Hanlon	Great Britain	1:07.52	
24	4	9	Ida Hulkko	Finland	1:07.58	
25	5	9	Letitia Sim	Singapore	1:07.65	
26	5	0	Thea Blomsterberg	Denmark	1:08.08	
27	4	0	Florine Gaspard	Belgium	1:08.34	
28	6	9	Jessica Vall	Spain	1:08.64	
29	6	7	Anastasia Gorbenko	Israel	1:08.66	
30	3	7	Ana Blažević	Croatia	1:08.70	
31	4	1	Jhennifer Conceição	Brazil	1:08.79	
32	3	1	Stefanía Gómez	Colombia	1:09.11	
33	3	3	Melissa Rodríguez	Mexico	1:09.16	
34	3	2	Andrea Podmaníková	Slovakia	1:09.39	
35	3	6	Tara Vovk	Slovenia	1:09.68	
36	3	5	Lin Pei-wun	Chinese Taipei	1:09.72	
37	3	4	Ana Rodrigues	Portugal	1:09.97	
38	2	4	Mercedes Toledo	Venezuela	1:10.37	
39	2	3	Emily Santos	Panama	1:10.57	
40	3	8	Maria-Thaleia Drasidou	Greece	1:10.67	
41	1	1	Chen Pui Lam	Macau	1:11.11	
42	3	0	Adelaida Pchelintseva	Kazakhstan	1:11.41	
43	2	7	Lynn El Hajj	Lebanon	1:11.57	NR
44	2	5	Phiangkhwan Pawapotako	Thailand	1:11.78	
45	2	6	Thanya Dela Cruz	Suspended Member Federation	1:11.79	
46	3	9	Lam Hoi Kiu	Hong Kong	1:12.62	
47	2	1	Imane El Barodi	Morocco	1:13.83	
48	2	2	Nadia Tudo Cubells	Andorra	1:13.89	
49	2	0	Valerie Tarazi	Palestine	1:13.95	
50	2	9	Jayla Pina	Cape Verde	1:14.09	NR
51	1	6	Aminata Barrow	Gambia	1:14.32	NR
52	2	8	Ramudi Samarakoon	Sri Lanka	1:15.36	
53	1	4	Kelera Mudunasoko	Fiji	1:15.77	
54	1	2	Tara Aloul	Jordan	1:16.45	
55	1	5	Lara Dashti	Kuwait	1:19.29	
56	1	7	Taeyanna Adams	Micronesia	1:25.99	
57	1	3	Mariama Touré	Guinea	1:35.41	NR

=== Semi-finals ===
The semi-finals were started on 24 July at 20:28.

Rank	Heat	Lane	Name	Nationality	Time	Notes
1	2	4	Rūta Meilutytė	Lithuania	1:05.09	Q
2	1	5	Lilly King	United States	1:05.45	Q
3	2	5	Tatjana Schoenmaker	South Africa	1:05.53	Q
4	1	4	Mona McSharry	Ireland	1:05.96	Q
5	2	2	Eneli Jefimova	Estonia	1:06.18	Q, NR
6	1	7	Sophie Hansson	Sweden	1:06.19	Q
7	1	1	Lydia Jacoby	United States	1:06.29	Q
8	2	3	Satomi Suzuki	Japan	1:06.31	Q
9	1	2	Reona Aoki	Japan	1:06.32	
10	1	6	Tes Schouten	Netherlands	1:06.53	
11	2	7	Martina Carraro	Italy	1:06.56	
12	2	1	Macarena Ceballos	Argentina	1:06.75	
13	1	8	Lisa Mamié	Switzerland	1:06.97	
14	1	3	Lisa Angiolini	Italy	1:07.03	
15	2	8	Abbey Harkin	Australia	1:07.11	
16	2	6	Dominika Sztandera	Poland	1:07.13	

=== Final ===
The final was held on 25 July at 21:45.

Rank	Lane	Name	Nationality	Time	Notes
1st place, gold medalist(s)	4	Rūta Meilutytė	Lithuania	1:04.62	
2nd place, silver medalist(s)	3	Tatjana Schoenmaker	South Africa	1:05.84	
3rd place, bronze medalist(s)	1	Lydia Jacoby	United States	1:05.94	
4	5	Lilly King	United States	1:06.02	
5	6	Mona McSharry	Ireland	1:06.07	
6	2	Eneli Jefimova	Estonia	1:06.36	
7	7	Sophie Hansson	Sweden	1:06.61	
8	8	Satomi Suzuki	Japan	1:06.67	
