= Lithuania at the 2023 World Aquatics Championships =

- Flag of Lithuania
- FINA code: LTU
- National federation: LTU Aquatics
- Website: www.ltuaquatics.com

in Fukuoka, Japan
- Competitors: 9 in 2 sports
- Medals Ranked 13th: Gold 2 Silver 0 Bronze 0 Total 2

World Aquatics Championships appearances (overview)
- 1994; 1998; 2001; 2003; 2005; 2007; 2009; 2011; 2013; 2015; 2017; 2019; 2022; 2023; 2024

Other related appearances
- Soviet Union (1973–1991)

Lithuania is set to compete at the 2023 World Aquatics Championships in Fukuoka, Japan from 14 to 30 July. LTU Aquatics selected a team of 2 divers and 7 swimmers to compete in Fukuoka.

== Medalists ==
Medal	Name	Sport	Event	Date
Gold	Rūta Meilutytė	Swimming	Women's 100 m breaststroke	25 July
Gold	Rūta Meilutytė	Swimming	Women's 50 m breaststroke	30 July

== Diving ==
Lithuania entered 2 divers.

Men

Athlete	Event	Preliminaries		Semifinals		Final	
Athlete	Event	Points	Rank	Points	Rank	Points	Rank
Sebastian Konecki	1 m springboard	216.45	62	—		Did not advance	
Sebastian Konecki	3 m springboard	222.60	66	Did not advance			
Martynas Lisauskas	1 m springboard	295.10	33	—		Did not advance	
Martynas Lisauskas	3 m springboard	246.05	63	Did not advance			

== Swimming ==
Lithuania entered 7 swimmers.

Men

Athlete	Event	Heat		Semifinal		Final	
Athlete	Event	Time	Rank	Time	Rank	Time	Rank
Danas Rapšys	100 m freestyle	49.00	32	Did not advance			
Danas Rapšys	200 m freestyle	1:46.87	17	Did not advance			
Andrius Šidlauskas	50 m breaststroke	27.98	28	Did not advance			
Andrius Šidlauskas	100 m breaststroke	59.90	10 Q	59.95	14	Did not advance	
Aleksas Savickas	200 m breaststroke	2:09.66	4 Q	2:10.16	11	Did not advance	
Erikas Grigaitis	100 m backstroke	55.23	30	Did not advance			
Erikas Grigaitis	200 m backstroke	2:00.98	26	Did not advance			
Daniil Pancerevas	50 m freestyle	23.30	60	Did not advance			
Daniil Pancerevas	200 m individual medley	2:03.76	30	Did not advance			

Women

Athlete	Event	Heat		Semifinal		Final	
Athlete	Event	Time	Rank	Time	Rank	Time	Rank
Kotryna Teterevkova	50 m breaststroke	30.94	19	Did not advance			
Kotryna Teterevkova	100 m breaststroke	1:06.96	17	Did not advance			
Kotryna Teterevkova	200 m breaststroke	2:24.87	5 Q	2:24.12	7 Q	2:24.22	6
Rūta Meilutytė	50 m breaststroke	30.39	8 Q	29.30 =WR	1 Q	29.16 WR	1st place, gold medalist(s)
Rūta Meilutytė	100 m breaststroke	1:04.67	1 Q	1:05.09	1 Q	1:04:62	1st place, gold medalist(s)
