= Lithuania at the 1994 World Aquatics Championships =

- Flag of Lithuania
- World Aquatics code: LTU
- National federation: Lietuvos plaukimo federacija
- Website: www.ltuswimming.com

in Rome, Italy
- Competitors: 7 in 1 sports
- Medals Ranked 20thth: Gold 0 Silver 0 Bronze 1 Total 1

World Aquatics Championships appearances (overview)
- 1994; 1998; 2001; 2003; 2005; 2007; 2009; 2011; 2013; 2015; 2017; 2019; 2022; 2023; 2024; 2025

Other related appearances
- Soviet Union (1973–1991)

Lithuania competed at the 1994 World Aquatics Championships in Rome, Italy.

== Medalists ==
Medal	Name	Sport	Event	Date
Bronze	Raimundas Mažuolis	Swimming	Men's 50 m freestyle	3 August

== Swimming ==
7 swimmers represented Lithuania:

Men

Athlete	Event	Heat		Final	
Athlete	Event	Time	Rank	Time	Rank
Nerius Beiga	100 m breaststroke	1:05.20	29	did not advance	
Nerius Beiga	200 m breaststroke	2:23.32	33	did not advance	
Raimundas Mažuolis	50 m freestyle	22.82	4 Q	22.52	3rd place, bronze medalist(s)
Raimundas Mažuolis	100 m freestyle	50.20	7 Q	50.20	7
Arūnas Savickas	100 m backstroke	57.76	25	did not advance	
Arūnas Savickas	200 m backstroke	2:02.47	14 Q	2:05.05	16
Mindaugas Špokas	100 m backstroke	58.36	33	did not advance	
Mindaugas Špokas	200 m backstroke	2:09.54	35	did not advance	
Tomas Tobulevičius	50 m freestyle	24.65	49	did not advance	
Tomas Tobulevičius	100 m freestyle	53.92	53	did not advance	
Arūnas Savickas; Nerius Beiga; Tomas Tobulevičius; Raimundas Mažuolis	4 x 100 m medley relay	4:07.46	16	did not advance	

Women

Athlete	Event	Heat		Final	
Athlete	Event	Time	Rank	Time	Rank
Laura Petrutytė	50 m freestyle	26.55 (s.o. 26.13)	=16 Q	26.47	14
Laura Petrutytė	100 m freestyle	58.55	33	did not advance	
Dita Želvienė	50 m freestyle	27.10	28	did not advance	
Dita Želvienė	100 m freestyle	58.77	37	did not advance	
