= Lithuania at the 2022 World Aquatics Championships =

- Flag of Lithuania
- FINA code: LTU
- National federation: Lithuanian Swimming Federation
- Website: www.ltuswimming.com

in Budapest, Hungary
- Competitors: 8 in 2 sports
- Medals: Gold 1 Silver 0 Bronze 1 Total 2

World Aquatics Championships appearances (overview)
- 1994; 1998; 2001; 2003; 2005; 2007; 2009; 2011; 2013; 2015; 2017; 2019; 2022; 2023; 2024

Other related appearances
- Soviet Union (1973–1991)

Lithuania competed at the 2022 World Aquatics Championships in Budapest, Hungary from 18 June to 3 July.

== Medalists ==
Medal	Name	Sport	Event	Date
Bronze	Rūta Meilutytė	Swimming	Women's 100 m breaststroke	20 June
Gold	Rūta Meilutytė	Swimming	Women's 50 m breaststroke	25 June

== Diving ==
Men

Athlete	Event	Preliminaries		Semifinals		Final	
Athlete	Event	Points	Rank	Points	Rank	Points	Rank
Sebastian Konecki	1 m springboard	257.50	41st	—		did not advance	

== Swimming ==
Men

Athlete	Event	Heat		Semifinal		Final	
Athlete	Event	Time	Rank	Time	Rank	Time	Rank
Erikas Grigaitis	100 m backstroke	-	DSQ	did not advance			
Erikas Grigaitis	200 m backstroke	1:59.92	18	did not advance			
Deividas Margevičius	100 m butterfly	53.44	37th	did not advance			
Danas Rapšys	200 m freestyle	1:46.70	8th Q	1:46.82	14th	did not advance	
Danas Rapšys	400 m freestyle	3:50.03	18th	—		did not advance	
Andrius Šidlauskas	50 m breaststroke	27.62	14th Q	27.54	14th	did not advance	
Andrius Šidlauskas	100 m breaststroke	59.90	7th Q	59.52	8th Q	59.80	8th
Andrius Šidlauskas	200 m breaststroke	2:13.13	20th	did not advance			
Tomas Navikonis	50 m freestyle	22.92	49th	did not advance			
Tomas Navikonis	100 m freestyle	49.93	39th	did not advance			
Erikas Grigaitis; Andrius Šidlauskas; Deividas Margevičius; Danas Rapšys	4 × 100 metre medley relay	-	DSQ	—		did not advance	

Women

Athlete	Event	Heat		Semifinal		Final	
Athlete	Event	Time	Rank	Time	Rank	Time	Rank
Rūta Meilutytė	50 m breaststroke	31.02	16th Q	29.97	2nd Q	29.70	1st place, gold medalist(s)
Rūta Meilutytė	100 m breaststroke	1:06.71	9th Q	1:06.04	4th Q	1:06.02	3rd place, bronze medalist(s)
Rūta Meilutytė	50 m freestyle	26.25	34th	did not advance			
Kotryna Teterevkova	50 m breaststroke	31.40	22nd	did not advance			
Kotryna Teterevkova	100 m breaststroke	1:06.97	12th Q	1:06.74	12th	did not advance	
Kotryna Teterevkova	200 m breaststroke	2:24.79	3rd Q	2:23.66	3rd Q	2:23.90	5th

Mixed

Athlete	Event	Heat		Final	
Athlete	Event	Time	Rank	Time	Rank
Erikas Grigaitis; Kotryna Teterevkova; Deividas Margevičius; Rūta Meilutytė	4×100 m medley relay	-	DSQ	did not advance	
