= Lithuania at the 2024 World Aquatics Championships =

- Flag of Lithuania
- FINA code: LTU
- National federation: LTU Aquatics
- Website: ltuswimming.com

in Doha, Qatar
- Competitors: 15 in 2 sports
- Medals Ranked 22nd: Gold 1 Silver 1 Bronze 0 Total 2

World Aquatics Championships appearances (overview)
- 1994; 1998; 2001; 2003; 2005; 2007; 2009; 2011; 2013; 2015; 2017; 2019; 2022; 2023; 2024

Other related appearances
- Soviet Union (1973–1991)

Lithuania competed at the 2024 World Aquatics Championships in Doha, Qatar from 2 to 18 February.

== Athletes by discipline ==
Lithuania sent 15 athletes to compete in two disciplines:

Sport	Men	Women	Total
Diving	2	0	2
Swimming	8	5	13
Total	10	5	15

== Medalists ==
Medal	Name	Sport	Event	Date
1st place, gold medalist(s)	Rūta Meilutytė	Swimming	Women's 50 metre breaststroke	18 February 2024
2nd place, silver medalist(s)	Danas Rapšys	Swimming	Men's 200 metre freestyle	13 February 2024

== Diving ==
Men

Athlete	Event	Preliminaries		Semifinals		Final	
Athlete	Event	Points	Rank	Points	Rank	Points	Rank
Sebastian Konecki	1 m springboard	243.55	34	—		Did not advance	
Sebastian Konecki	3 m springboard	283.35	50	Did not advance			
Martynas Lisauskas	1 m springboard	276.70	26	—		Did not advance	
Martynas Lisauskas	3 m springboard	262.90	59	Did not advance			
Sebastian Konecki; Martynas Lisauskas	Synchronized 3 m springboard	—				247.35	24

== Swimming ==
Men

Athlete	Event	Heat		Semifinal		Final	
Athlete	Event	Time	Rank	Time	Rank	Time	Rank
Andrius Šidlauskas	50 metre breaststroke	28.47	31	Did not advance			
Andrius Šidlauskas	100 metre breaststroke	59.84	11 Q	59.79	12	Did not advance	
Andrius Šidlauskas	200 metre breaststroke	2:14.28	19	Did not advance			
Erikas Grigaitis	100 metre backstroke	55.48	29	Did not advance			
Erikas Grigaitis	200 metre backstroke	2:01.32	21	Did not advance			
Danas Rapšys	200 metre freestyle	1:45.95	3 Q	1:44.96	1 Q	1:45.05	2nd place, silver medalist(s)
Danas Rapšys	400 metre freestyle	3:48.72	20	—		Did not advance	
Mantas Kaušpėdas	50 metre backstroke	Disqualified		Did not advance			
Daniil Pancerevas	200 metre individual medley	2:04.16	25	Did not advance			
Tomas Lukminas	100 metre freestyle	49.18	23	Did not advance			
Tomas Navikonis; Daniil Pancerevas; Tomas Lukminas; Rokas Jazdauskas	4 × 100 metre freestyle relay	3:17.41	13	—		Did not advance	
Danas Rapšys; Tomas Navikonis; Tomas Lukminas; Rokas Jazdauskas	4 × 200 metre freestyle relay	7:09.97 NR	5	—		7:11.57	7

Women

Athlete	Event	Heat		Semifinal		Final	
Athlete	Event	Time	Rank	Time	Rank	Time	Rank
Smiltė Plytnykaitė	50 metre freestyle	26.31	45	Did not advance			
Smiltė Plytnykaitė	100 metre freestyle	56.34	25	Did not advance			
Sylvia Statkevičius	200 metre freestyle	2:03.03	32	Did not advance			
Kotryna Teterevkova	50 metre breaststroke	Did not start					
Kotryna Teterevkova	100 metre breaststroke	1:06.85	6 Q	1:06.61	7 Q	1:06.02	4
Kotryna Teterevkova	200 metre breaststroke	2:25.09	3 Q	2:24.69	6 Q	Withdrew	
Rūta Meilutytė	50 metre breaststroke	30.05	3 Q	29.42	1 Q	29.40	1st place, gold medalist(s)
Rūta Meilutytė	100 metre breaststroke	1:07.79	17	Did not advance			
Patricija Geriksonaitė	50 metre backstroke	29.88	36	Did not advance			
Rūta Meilutytė; Sylvia Statkevičius; Smiltė Plytnykaitė; Patricija Geriksonaitė	4 × 100 metre freestyle relay	3:44.99	11	—		Did not advance	
Rūta Meilutytė; Kotryna Teterevkova; Smiltė Plytnykaitė; Patricija Geriksonaitė	4 × 100 metre medley relay	Did not start		—		Did not advance	

Mixed

Athlete	Event	Heat		Semifinal		Final	
Athlete	Event	Time	Rank	Time	Rank	Time	Rank
Erikas Grigaitis; Rūta Meilutytė; Andrius Šidlauskas; Smiltė Plytnykaitė	4 × 100 metre medley relay	3:51.99	15	—		Did not advance	
