= Lithuania at the 1998 World Aquatics Championships =

- Flag of Lithuania
- FINA code: LTU
- National federation: Lietuvos plaukimo federacija
- Website: www.ltuswimming.com

in Perth, Western Australia
- Competitors: 2 in 1 sports
- Medals: Gold 0 Silver 0 Bronze 0 Total 0

World Aquatics Championships appearances (overview)
- 1994; 1998; 2001; 2003; 2005; 2007; 2009; 2011; 2013; 2015; 2017; 2019; 2022; 2023; 2024

Other related appearances
- Soviet Union (1973–1991)

Lithuania competed at the 1998 World Aquatics Championships in Perth, Western Australia.

== Swimming ==
2 swimmers represented Lithuania:

Men

Athlete	Event	Heat		Final	
Athlete	Event	Time	Rank	Time	Rank
Darius Grigalionis	100 m backstroke	56.78	17	did not advance	
Darius Grigalionis	200 m backstroke	2:07.39	23	did not advance	
Arūnas Savickas	100 m freestyle	52.94	46	did not advance	
Arūnas Savickas	100 m backstroke	57.10	23	did not advance	
Arūnas Savickas	200 m backstroke	2:02.92	13 Q	2:03.74	14
