= 2022 FINA World Swimming Championships (25 m) – Men's 400 metre freestyle =

Swimming competition

Men's 400 metre freestyle at the 2022 FINA World Swimming Championships (25 m)
- Venue: Melbourne Sports and Aquatic Centre
- Location: Melbourne, Australia
- Dates: 15 December (heats and final)
- Competitors: 34 from 30 nations
- Winning time: 3:34.38

Medalists
gold medal	Kieran Smith	United States
silver medal	Thomas Neill	Australia
bronze medal	Danas Rapšys	Lithuania

The Men's 400 metre freestyle competition of the 2022 FINA World Swimming Championships (25 m) was held on 15 December 2022.

== Records ==
Prior to the competition, the existing world and championship records were as follows.

World record	Yannick Agnel (FRA)	3:32.25	Angers, France	15 November 2012
Competition record	Danas Rapšys (LTU)	3:34.01	Hangzhou, China	11 December 2018

== Results ==
=== Heats ===
The heats were started at 12:25.

Rank	Heat	Lane	Name	Nationality	Time	Notes
1	5	4	Kieran Smith	United States	3:36.91	Q
2	5	3	Matteo Ciampi	Italy	3:37.73	Q
3	4	2	Katsuhiro Matsumoto	Japan	3:37.96	Q
4	4	3	Mack Horton	Australia	3:38.09	Q
5	4	6	Thomas Neill	Australia	3:38.23	Q
6	4	5	Antonio Djakovic	Switzerland	3:38.57	Q
7	4	4	Danas Rapšys	Lithuania	3:38.71	Q
8	5	6	Jake Magahey	United States	3:38.74	Q
9	3	6	Kim Woo-min	South Korea	3:38.86	
10	5	1	Tom Dean	Great Britain	3:39.79	
11	5	7	Logan Fontaine	France	3:39.84	
12	5	5	Matthew Sates	South Africa	3:41.05	
13	3	4	Breno Correia	Brazil	3:41.89	
14	4	7	Shogo Takeda	Japan	3:42.16	
15	3	1	Daniel Jervis	Great Britain	3:42.85	
16	2	3	Luis Domínguez	Spain	3:43.18	
17	5	2	Luc Kroon	Netherlands	3:44.76	
18	3	3	Joaquín Vargas	Peru	3:45.66	
19	2	6	Yordan Yanchev	Bulgaria	3:45.70	
20	3	2	Louis Clark	New Zealand	3:46.19	
21	1	4	Mert Kılavuz	Turkey	3:46.32	
22	2	5	Santiago Corredor	Colombia	3:47.60	
23	3	8	Lucas Alba	Argentina	3:48.47	
24	2	2	Jakub Poliačik	Slovakia	3:49.93	
25	2	4	Cheuk Ming Ho	Hong Kong	3:49.94	
26	2	8	Wesley Roberts	Cook Islands	3:50.03	
27	1	7	Max Mannes	Luxembourg	3:50.63	
28	1	6	Luke Thompson	Bahamas	3:56.22	NR
29	1	3	Mark Ducaj	Albania	3:56.41	
30	2	1	Pavel Alovatki	Moldova	3:56.60	
31	3	7	David Popovici	Romania	3:58.48	
32	1	5	Dylan Cachia	Malta	4:05.61	
33	1	2	Ivan Hart	Suspended Member Federation	4:08.64	
34	1	1	Israel Poppe	Guam	4:17.65	
	2	7	Victor Johansson	Sweden	Did not start	
	3	5	Jon Jøntvedt	Norway	Did not start	
	4	1	Roman Fuchs	France	Did not start	
	4	8	Fei Liwei	China	Did not start	
	5	8	Marwan Elkamash	Egypt	Did not start	

=== Final ===
The final was held at 21:31.

Rank	Lane	Name	Nationality	Time	Notes
1st place, gold medalist(s)	4	Kieran Smith	United States	3:34.38	AM
2nd place, silver medalist(s)	2	Thomas Neill	Australia	3:35.05	
3rd place, bronze medalist(s)	1	Danas Rapšys	Lithuania	3:36.26	
4	3	Katsuhiro Matsumoto	Japan	3:36.87	NR
5	7	Antonio Djakovic	Switzerland	3:37.86	
6	6	Mack Horton	Australia	3:37.94	
7	8	Jake Magahey	United States	3:38.12	
8	5	Matteo Ciampi	Italy	3:38.98	
