= Finland at the 2023 World Aquatics Championships =

- Flag of Finland
- World Aquatics code: FIN
- National federation: Finnish Swimming Federation
- Website: uimaliitto.fi (in Finnish)

in Fukuoka, Japan
- Competitors: 6 in 2 sports
- Medals: Gold 0 Silver 0 Bronze 0 Total 0

World Aquatics Championships appearances
- 1973; 1975; 1978; 1982; 1986; 1991; 1994; 1998; 2001; 2003; 2005; 2007; 2009; 2011; 2013; 2015; 2017; 2019; 2022; 2023; 2024; 2025

Finland competed at the 2023 World Aquatics Championships in Fukuoka, Japan from 14 to 30 July.

== Diving ==
Finland entered 1 diver.

Women

Athlete	Event	Preliminaries		Semifinal		Final	
Athlete	Event	Points	Rank	Points	Rank	Points	Rank
Lauren Hallaselkä	1 m springboard	227.50	20	—N/a		Did not advance	
Lauren Hallaselkä	3 m springboard	193.35	45	Did not advance			

== Swimming ==
Finland entered 5 swimmers.

Men

Athlete	Event	Heat		Semifinal		Final	
Athlete	Event	Time	Rank	Time	Rank	Time	Rank
Olli Kokko	50 metre breaststroke	27.99	29	Did not advance			
Matti Mattsson	100 metre breaststroke	1:00.62	20	Did not advance			
Matti Mattsson	200 metre breaststroke	2:11.00	14 Q	2:09.93	10	Did not advance	

Women

Athlete	Event	Heat		Semifinal		Final	
Athlete	Event	Time	Rank	Time	Rank	Time	Rank
Ida Hulkko	50 metre breaststroke	30.98	21	Did not advance			
Ida Hulkko	100 metre breaststroke	1:07.58	24	Did not advance			
Veera Kivirinta	50 metre breaststroke	30.33	6 Q	30.56	13	Did not advance	
Laura Lahtinen	200 metre breaststroke	2:35.16	27	Did not advance			
Laura Lahtinen	100 metre butterfly	1:00.56	31	Did not advance			
Laura Lahtinen	200 metre butterfly	2:13.65	25	Did not advance			
