= List of Gambian records in swimming =

The Gambian records in swimming are the fastest ever performances of swimmers from The Gambia, which are recognised and ratified by the Gambia Swimming & Aquatic Sports Association.

All records were set in finals unless noted otherwise.

== Long Course (50 m) ==
=== Men ===
Event	Time		Name	Club	Date	Meet	Location	Ref
50m freestyle	26.93	h	Folarin Ogunsola	Gambia	2 August 2013	World Championships	Barcelona, Spain	
100m freestyle	1:04.09	h	Omar Darboe	Gambia	20 August 2022	African Championships	Tunis, Tunisia	
200 m freestyle								
400 m freestyle								
800 m freestyle								
1500 m freestyle								
50 m backstroke								
100 m backstroke								
200 m backstroke								
50m breaststroke	33.70	h, †	Omar Darboe	Gambia	21 August 2022	African Championships	Tunis, Tunisia	
100m breaststroke	1:14.50	h	Omar Darboe	Gambia	21 August 2022	African Championships	Tunis, Tunisia	
200 m breaststroke								
50m butterfly	28.50	h	Folarin Ogunsola	Gambia	28 July 2013	World Championships	Barcelona, Spain	
100 m butterfly								
200 m butterfly								
200 m individual medley								
400 m individual medley								
4×100 m freestyle relay								
4×200 m freestyle relay								
4×100 m medley relay								

Legend: # – Record awaiting ratification by Gambia Swimming & Aquatic Sports Association; WR – World record; AF – African record;
Records not set in finals: h – heat; sf – semifinal; r – relay 1st leg; rh – relay heat 1st leg; b – B final; † – en route to final mark; tt – time trial

=== Women ===
Event	Time		Name	Club	Date	Meet	Location	Ref
50 m freestyle	27.83	h	Aminata Barrow	The Gambia	2 August 2025	World Championships	Singapore, Singapore	
100 m freestyle								
200 m freestyle								
400 m freestyle								
800 m freestyle								
1500 m freestyle								
50 m backstroke								
100 m backstroke								
200 m backstroke								
50 m breaststroke	34.58	h, †	Aminata Barrow	The Gambia	28 July 2024	Olympic Games	Paris, France	
100 m breaststroke	1:13.30		Aminata Barrow	-		-		
200 m breaststroke	2:37.01	h	Aminata Barrow	The Gambia	27 July 2023	World Championships	Fukuoka, Japan	
50 m butterfly	30.85		Aminata Barrow	-	17 June 2021	Finnish Championships	Finland	
100 m butterfly	1:07.86		Aminata Barrow	-	18 June 2021	Finnish Championships	Finland	
200 m butterfly								
200 m individual medley	2:25.67		Aminata Barrow	The Gambia	4 May 2024	Cana Championships	Luanda, Angola	
400 m individual medley								
4×100 m freestyle relay								
4×200 m freestyle relay								
4×100 m medley relay								

Legend: # – Record awaiting ratification by Gambia Swimming & Aquatic Sports Association; WR – World record; AF – African record;
Records not set in finals: h – heat; sf – semifinal; r – relay 1st leg; rh – relay heat 1st leg; b – B final; † – en route to final mark; tt – time trial

== Short Course (25 m) ==
=== Men ===
Event	Time		Name	Club	Date	Meet	Location	Ref
50m freestyle	28.46	h	Pap D. Jonga	The Gambia	8 December 2016	World Championships	Windsor, Canada	
100 m freestyle	1:02.79	h	Ebrima Buaro	The Gambia	20 December 2021	World Championships	Abu Dhabi, United Arab Emirates	
200 m freestyle								
400 m freestyle								
800 m freestyle								
1500 m freestyle								
50m backstroke								
100m backstroke								
200m backstroke								
50m breaststroke	36.99	h	Jegan Jobe	The Gambia	10 December 2016	World Championships	Windsor, Canada	
100m breaststroke	1:26.02	h	Jegan Jobe	The Gambia	6 December 2016	World Championships	Windsor, Canada	
200 m breaststroke								
50m butterfly	30.58	h	Pap D. Jonga	The Gambia	9 December 2016	World Championships	Windsor, Canada	
100 m butterfly								
200 m butterfly								
100 m individual medley								
200 m individual medley								
400 m individual medley								
4×50 m freestyle relay								
4×100 m freestyle relay								
4×200 m freestyle relay								
4×50 m medley relay								
4×100 m medley relay								

Legend: # – Record awaiting ratification by Gambia Swimming & Aquatic Sports Association; WR – World record; AF – African record;
Records not set in finals: h – heat; sf – semifinal; r – relay 1st leg; rh – relay heat 1st leg; b – B final; † – en route to final mark; tt – time trial

=== Women ===
Event	Time		Name	Club	Date	Meet	Location	Ref
50m freestyle	46.14	h	Sainabou Sam	The Gambia	15 December 2018	World Championships	Hangzhou, China	
100 m freestyle								
200 m freestyle								
400 m freestyle								
800 m freestyle								
1500 m freestyle								
50m backstroke								
100 m backstroke								
200 m backstroke								
50 m breaststroke								
100 m breaststroke								
200 m breaststroke								
50 m butterfly								
100 m butterfly								
200 m butterfly								
100 m individual medley								
200 m individual medley								
400 m individual medley								
4×50 m freestyle relay								
4×100 m freestyle relay								
4×200 m freestyle relay								
4×50 m medley relay								
4×100 m medley relay								

Legend: # – Record awaiting ratification by Gambia Swimming & Aquatic Sports Association; WR – World record; AF – African record;
Records not set in finals: h – heat; sf – semifinal; r – relay 1st leg; rh – relay heat 1st leg; b – B final; † – en route to final mark; tt – time trial
