= Swimming at the 2023 World Aquatics Championships – Women's 50 metre breaststroke =

Women's 50 metre breaststroke at the 2023 World Aquatics Championships
- Venue: Marine Messe Fukuoka
- Location: Fukuoka, Japan
- Dates: 29 July (heats and semifinals); 30 July (final)
- Competitors: 51 from 44 nations
- Winning time: 29.16 WR

Medalists
gold medal	Rūta Meilutytė	Lithuania
silver medal	Lilly King	United States
bronze medal	Benedetta Pilato	Italy

The women's 50 metre breaststroke competition at the 2023 World Aquatics Championships was held on 29 and 30 July 2023.

== Records ==
Prior to the competition, the existing world and championship records were as follows:

World record	Benedetta Pilato (ITA)	29.30	Budapest, Hungary	22 May 2021
Competition record	Lilly King (USA)	29.40	Budapest, Hungary	30 July 2017

The following records were established during the competition:

Date	Event	Name	Nationality	Time	Record
29 July	Semifinal 2	Rūta Meilutytė	Lithuania	29.30	=WR
30 July	Final	Rūta Meilutytė	Lithuania	29.16	WR

== Results ==
=== Heats ===
The heats were started on 29 July at 11:10.

Rank	Heat	Lane	Name	Nationality	Time	Notes
1	5	4	Benedetta Pilato	Italy	29.60	Q
2	6	1	Anita Bottazzo	Italy	30.02	Q
3	6	5	Lilly King	United States	30.05	Q
4	5	3	Tang Qianting	China	30.08	Q, AS
5	6	2	Satomi Suzuki	Japan	30.29	Q
6	5	6	Veera Kivirinta	Finland	30.33	Q
6	6	3	Anna Elendt	Germany	30.33	Q
8	4	5	Eneli Jefimova	Estonia	30.39	Q
8	6	4	Rūta Meilutytė	Lithuania	30.39	Q
8	6	7	Sophie Hansson	Sweden	30.39	Q
11	5	5	Lydia Jacoby	United States	30.44	Q
12	6	6	Mona McSharry	Ireland	30.45	Q
13	5	7	Dominika Sztandera	Poland	30.68	Q
14	4	6	Tatjana Schoenmaker	South Africa	30.70	Q-->WD
15	4	7	Fleur Vermeiren	Belgium	30.73	Q
16	4	2	Florine Gaspard	Belgium	30.75	Q
17	4	4	Lara van Niekerk	South Africa	30.76	Q
18	5	8	Yang Chang	China	30.85	
19	6	8	Kotryna Teterevkova	Lithuania	30.94	
20	6	0	Macarena Ceballos	Argentina	30.97	
21	4	1	Ida Hulkko	Finland	30.98	
22	4	0	Sophie Angus	Canada	31.01	
23	4	3	Jhennifer Alves	Brazil	31.04	
24	3	4	Letitia Sim	Singapore	31.33	
25	5	2	Anastasia Gorbenko	Israel	31.41	
26	3	2	Andrea Podmanikova	Slovakia	31.43	NR
27	5	1	Maria Drasidou	Greece	31.44	
28	3	3	Adelaida Pchelintseva	Kazakhstan	31.61	
29	6	9	Abbey Harkin	Australia	31.63	
30	3	5	Lisa Mamie	Switzerland	31.67	
31	5	0	Tara Vovk	Slovenia	31.97	
32	3	7	Mercedes Toledo	Venezuela	32.00	
33	5	9	Jenjira Srisa-Ard	Thailand	32.02	
34	3	6	Melissa Rodríguez	Mexico	32.05	
35	3	8	Emily Santos	Panama	32.23	NR
36	4	9	Thanya Dela Cruz	Suspended Member Federation	32.25	
37	1	3	Chen Pui Lam	Macau	32.31	NR
38	3	0	Imane El Barodi	Morocco	32.64	
39	3	9	Lynn El Hajj	Lebanon	33.10	NR
40	2	4	Marina Abu Shamaleh	Palestine	34.86	
41	2	5	Lara Dashti	Kuwait	35.44	NR
42	2	6	Maria Batallones	Northern Mariana Islands	35.96	
43	2	2	Kestra Kihleng	Micronesia	36.55	
44	2	3	Makelyta Singsombath	Laos	36.83	
45	2	9	La Troya Pina	Cape Verde	38.14	
46	2	0	Ria Save	Tanzania	40.30	
47	2	7	Mariama Touré	Guinea	41.81	
48	1	5	Estelle Nguelo'o Noubissi	Cameroon	43.59	
49	1	6	Salima Ahmadou Youssoufou	Niger	45.97	NR
50	2	8	Nina Amison	Djibouti	49.61	
	1	2	Olamide Sam	Sierra Leone	DSQ	
	1	4	Dorcas Oka	Nigeria	DSQ	
	3	1	Lam Hoi Kiu	Hong Kong	DSQ	
	2	1	Abbi Illis	Sint Maarten	Did not start	
	4	8	Ana Pinho Rodrigues	Portugal	Did not start	

=== Semifinals ===
The semifinals were held on 29 July at 20:26.

Rank	Heat	Lane	Name	Nationality	Time	Notes
1	2	2	Rūta Meilutytė	Lithuania	29.30	Q, =WR
2	2	5	Lilly King	United States	29.72	Q
3	1	8	Lara van Niekerk	South Africa	29.91	Q
4	2	4	Benedetta Pilato	Italy	30.09	Q
5	1	5	Tang Qianting	China	30.12	Q
6	1	6	Eneli Jefimova	Estonia	30.22	Q
7	1	4	Anita Bottazzo	Italy	30.29	Q
8	2	3	Satomi Suzuki	Japan	30.33	Q
9	1	2	Sophie Hansson	Sweden	30.40	SO
9	2	7	Lydia Jacoby	United States	30.40	SO
11	1	7	Mona McSharry	Ireland	30.54	
12	2	6	Anna Elendt	Germany	30.55	
13	1	3	Veera Kivirinta	Finland	30.56	
14	2	1	Dominika Sztandera	Poland	30.59	NR
15	2	8	Florine Gaspard	Belgium	30.67	
16	1	1	Fleur Vermeiren	Belgium	31.26	

==== Swim-off ====
The swim-off for the first replacement was held on 29 July at 22:13.

Rank	Lane	Name	Nationality	Time	Notes
1	4	Sophie Hansson	Sweden	30.44	R1
2	5	Lydia Jacoby	United States	30.67	R2

=== Final ===
The final started on 30 July at 20:09.

Rank	Lane	Name	Nationality	Time	Notes
1st place, gold medalist(s)	4	Rūta Meilutytė	Lithuania	29.16	WR
2nd place, silver medalist(s)	5	Lilly King	United States	29.94	
3rd place, bronze medalist(s)	6	Benedetta Pilato	Italy	30.04	
4	3	Lara van Niekerk	South Africa	30.09	
5	1	Anita Bottazzo	Italy	30.11	
6	2	Tang Qianting	China	30.22	
7	8	Satomi Suzuki	Japan	30.44	
8	7	Eneli Jefimova	Estonia	30.48	
