= Mindaugas Sadauskas =

Lithuanian swimmer (born 1990)

- At 2012 Olympic Games

Personal information
- National team: Lithuania
- Born: 14 June 1990 (age 36) Panevėžys, Lithuania
- Height: 1.93 m (6 ft 4 in)
- Weight: 95 kg (209 lb)
- Spouse: Nina Rangelova (m. 2018)

Sport
- Sport: Swimming
- Strokes: Freestyle
- College team: SMU Mustangs

Mindaugas Sadauskas (born 14 June 1990) is a Lithuanian swimmer who specialized in sprint freestyle events. He is a multiple-time Lithuanian champion, who represented his country at the FINA World Championships, LEN European Championships and other international competition. Sadauskas also represented Lithuania at the London Olympic Games in 2012. He has seven national level records at the moment. Sadauskas is also a member of the swimming team for SMU Mustangs at the Southern Methodist University in Dallas, Texas. Sadauskas achieved multiple gold medals at the Conference USA while studying at the SMU.

== Early life ==
Sadauskas was born 14 June 1990 in Panevezys, Lithuania, to Laima and Vygantas Sadauskas. He attended Panevezio Zemynos secondary school and swam for Panevezio Zemynos all over the world, graduating in 2009.

In college, he competed for the Southern Methodist University Mustangs under Head Coach Eddie Sinnott for four years with remarkable achievements. He received a Bachelor of Art degree from Southern Methodist University (SMU) in 2014. After graduating SMU, Sadauskas moved to Plymouth, England, where he continued to develop his swimming skills and completed a Masters of Science degree in International Logistics and Chain Supply Management in 2016. His elite international swimming career advanced when he qualified for the European Youth Olympic Festival in 2005. In 2018 Sadauskas married Bulgarian Olympic swimmer Nina Rangelova.

== Career ==
=== 2009 ===
In 2009, Sadauskas won his first individual title at the Conference USA Championships in Houston, Texas, posting a time of 0:44:18 sec. in the 100 yard Freestyle event.

At the 2009 FINA World Championships in Rome, Italy, Sadauskas represented Lithuania and placed 36th in the 100 m Freestyle event. He posted his new personal best time of 0:49:26 sec. in the preliminary heats, missing the semifinals by less than a second.

Sadauskas set an individual-split time of 48.90 seconds, and a national record of 3:16.47, along with his teammates Vytautas Janušaitis, Paulius Viktoravičius, and Mindaugas Margis, in the men's 400 m freestyle relay at the 2009 FINA World Championships in Rome, Italy. He also competed in the 50 m Freestyle event.

=== 2010-2011 ===
In 2010, Sadauskas took four gold medals in the individual events at the Conference USA Championships in Houston, Texas. He posted a time of 0:43:03 sec. in the 100yard Freestyle that qualified for NCAA Championship.

At the 2011 FINA World Championships in Shanghai, China, Sadauskas placed 29th in the 100 m Freestyle event with the time 0:49:66 sec. He also competed in the 50 m Freestyle and placed 34th place. Sadauskas in both events failed to advance into the semifinals.

Sadauskas represented Lithuania and Southern Methodist University at the XXVI Universiade Games in Shenzhen, China. He posted a time of 0:50:14 sec. and took 8th place in the final of the 100m. Freestyle event.

== 2012 Summer Olympics ==
Sadauskas qualified for the men's 100 m freestyle at the 2012 Summer Olympics in London, by breaking a meet record and eclipsing a FINA B-standard entry time of 49.54 seconds from the Open Luxembourg Nationals in Luxembourg City. At the 2012 Summer Olympics, he challenged seven other Olympians in the fifth heat, including three-time Olympian and UC Berkeley graduate Dominik Meichtry of Switzerland. Sadauskas edged out Meichtry to take a fourth spot by 0.17 of a second, outside his entry time of 49.78 seconds. He failed to advance to the semifinals, placing twenty-eighth overall in the preliminaries.

Sadauskas competed at the FINA World Short Course Championship in Istanbul, Turkey. He qualified for the 100 m Freestyle semifinals with a time of 0:47:82 sec, but did no advance to the final, placing 16th overall.

=== 2013-2014 ===
In 2013, Sadauskas swam the second fastest time in the 100 m Freestyle in SMU Mustangs history at the Conference USA Houston, Texas, with a time of 0:42.77 sec. and qualified for the NCAA Championship.

Sadauskas also raced at the Arena Grand Prix Mesa, Arizona, where he finished 4th in the 100 m Freestyle with a time of 0:49:78 sec. Sadauskas was left behind by an Olympian champion Nathan Adrian, Richard Berens and another Olympian Darian Townsend.

In the summer of 2013, Sadauskas competed at the XXVII Universiade Games in Kazan, Russia. During his performances, he qualified for the semifinals in the 50 m Freestyle and finished in 14th place with a time of 0:23:02 sec.

At the 2013 FINA World Championships in Barcelona, Spain, Sadauskas participated in the 50m. and 100 m. Freestyle events, but did not advance to the finals. Sadauskas and his teammates Danas Rapsys, Giedrius Titenis and Tadas Duskinas participated in the 400 Medley Relay where they placed 13th with a new national record of 3:36:72. Sadauskas also set an individual-split time of 0:48:76seconds.

At the 2013 LEN European Short Course Championship in Herning, Denmark, Sadauskas and his teammates Danas Rapsys, Giedrius Titenis and Tadas Duskinas were 4th in the 200Medley Relay with a time of 1:35:26, a new national record.

At the 2014 LEN European Long Course Championship in Berlin, Germany, Sadauskas had 7th places finishes along with his teammates Danas Rapsys, Giedrius Titenis and Tadas Duskinas in the 400 Medley Relay and 400 Freestyle Relay with times of 3:36:18 and 3:19:91.

In 2014, FINA 12nd World Short Course Championships in Doha, Qatar, Sadauskas placed 7th and 11th, respectively in the 200 Medley Relay with a time of 1:34:35, a new national record and the 400 Medley Relay with a time of 3:28:76 seconds.

=== 2015 season ===
Sadauskas competed at the International de Canet-en-Roussillon Meet, Canet-En-Rousillon, France, where he was 8th in the 100 m Freestyle event with a time of 0:49:54 seconds.

At the 52nd. Sette Colli International Trophy Meet in Rome, Italy, Sadauskas participated in the 100 m Freestyle event and was 6th with a time of 0:49:68 seconds and in the 50 m Freestyle event Sadauskas was 8th with a time of 0:22:54 seconds.

At the FINA 16th World Championship in Kazan, Russia, Sadauskas and his Lithuanian teammates Danas Rapsys, Giedrius Titenis and Tadas Duskinas made 2016 Summer Olympics qualification standard. Sadauskas was part of the 400Medley Relay which was 12th overall and qualified for the Rio 2008 Summer Olympics.

At the 2015 LEN European Championship in Netanya, Israel, Sadauskas surprised Lithuania and the world with a new Lithuanian national record in the 100 m Freestyle event, placing 7th with a time of 0:47:18.

== Personal best times ==
Long course
Event	Time	Meet
50 m Freestyle	0:22:54	2015 SetteColli International Meet
100 m Freestyle	0:49:26	2009 FINA World Championships

Short course
Event	Time	Meet
50 m Freestyle	0:21:63	2015 European Short Course Championships
100 m Freestyle	0:47:18	2015 European Short Course Championships
50 m Butterfly	0:23:33	2013 European Short Course Championships
100 m Individual Medley	0:54:43	2012 FINA World Short Course Championships
