= Deividas Margevičius =

Lithuanian swimmer (born 1995)

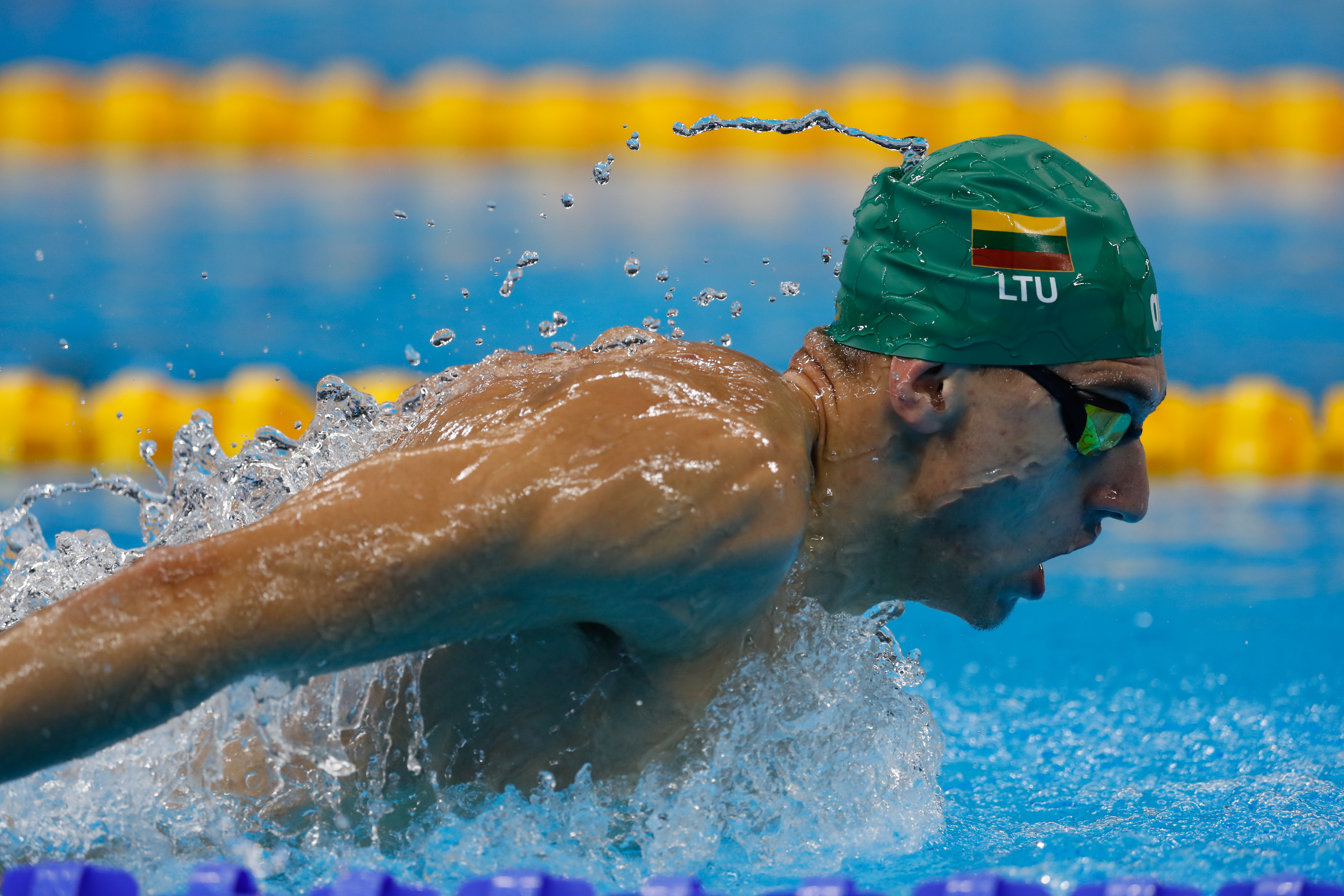
- Margevičius at the 2016 Olympics

Personal information
- Full name: Deividas Margevičius
- Nationality: Lithuania
- Born: April 26, 1995 (age 31) Lithuania
- Height: 187 cm (6 ft 2 in)

Sport
- Sport: Swimming
- Strokes: Butterfly
- Club: Kauno Centro SM
- Coach: Jolanta Dulevičienė

Deividas Margevičius (born 26 April 1995) is a Lithuanian butterfly swimmer. In 2016 he won the national 100 m, setting a new national record at 53.53. With the best national season time (53.12) he was selected to represent Lithuania in 2016 Summer Olympics in the 4 × 100 m medley relay.

In 2019, he competed at the 2019 World Aquatics Championships held in Gwangju, South Korea.

On 20 September 2022 Margevičius announced about his retirement from professional sport.
