= Sergej Baziuk =

Lithuanian diver (born 1983)

Personal information
- Born: 13 June 1983 (age 42)

Sport
- Sport: Diving

Sergej Baziuk (born 13 June 1983) is a Lithuanian diver.

== Achievements ==
Year	Competition	Venue	Position	Event	Notes
2008	European Championships	Eindhoven, Netherlands	20th	10 m individual	296.30
2009	World Championships	Rome, Italy	49th	3 m individual	279.30
2009	World Championships	Rome, Italy	19th	3 m team	327.42
2011	European Championships	Turin, Italy	24th	1 m individual	271.15
2011	European Championships	Turin, Italy	28th	3 m individual	246.6
2011	European Championships	Turin, Italy	12th	3 m team	330.60
2011	World Championships	Shanghai, China	47th	3 m individual	301.20
2011	World Championships	Shanghai, China	17th	3 m team	301.77
