= Rimvydas Šalčius =

Lithuanian swimmer

Personal information
- Full name: Rimvydas Šalčius
- National team: Lithuania
- Born: 30 January 1985 (age 41) Kaunas, Lithuanian SSR, Soviet Union
- Height: 1.73 m (5 ft 8 in)
- Weight: 73 kg (161 lb)

Sport
- Sport: Swimming
- Strokes: Butterfly
- Club: Silainiai
Medal record
Men's swimming
Representing Lithuania
European Junior Championships
Gold medal – first place	2003 Glasgow	100 m butterfly

Rimvydas Šalčius (born January 30, 1985) is a Lithuanian former swimmer, who specialized in butterfly events. He is a multiple-time Lithuanian champion, and a two-time national record holder in both the men's butterfly and medley relay events. He also set a junior record time of 53.25 seconds by winning the gold medal in the men's 100 m butterfly at the 2003 European Championships in Glasgow, Scotland.

Salcius made his Olympic debut, as a 19-year-old, at the 2004 Summer Olympics in Athens, where he competed in the men's 100 m butterfly. He touched out Colombia's Camilo Becerra by a quarter of a second (0.25) to take a fourth spot and thirty-fifth overall in the fourth heat, with a time of 54.45 seconds.

At the 2008 Summer Olympics in Beijing, Salcius qualified for his second Lithuanian team in the men's 100 m butterfly. He cleared a FINA B-standard entry time of 54.16 from the European Championships in Eindhoven, Netherlands. Unlike his previous Games, Salcius posted his lifetime best and broke a Lithuanian record of 52.90 seconds to touch the wall first in heat 3 by less than 0.18 of a second ahead of three-time Olympian Jeremy Knowles of the Bahamas. Salcius failed to advance again into the semifinals, as he placed thirty-fourth out of 66 swimmers in the prelims. He also tied his position with Canada's Joe Bartoch.
