= Paulius Andrijauskas =

Lithuanian swimmer (born 1984)

Personal information
- Full name: Paulius Andrijauskas
- National team: Lithuania
- Born: 29 September 1984 (age 41) Panevėžys, Lithuanian SSR, Soviet Union
- Height: 1.89 m (6 ft 2 in)
- Weight: 86 kg (190 lb)

Sport
- Sport: Swimming
- Strokes: Butterfly
- Club: Žemyna Panevėžys
- Coach: Ina Simeliunaite

Paulius Andrijauskas (born 29 September 1984) is a Lithuanian swimmer, who specialized in butterfly events. He currently holds two Lithuanian records in the 200 m butterfly (2:01.98), and 4×200 m freestyle relay (7:25.37) from the 2007 FINA World Championships in Melbourne, Australia.

Andrijauskas qualified for the men's 200 m butterfly at the 2004 Summer Olympics in Athens, by eclipsing a FINA B-standard entry time of 2:03.20 from the national championships in Kaunas. He challenged seven other swimmers on the second heat, including Olympic veteran Vladan Marković of Serbia and Montenegro. He edged out Markovic to take a fifth spot by 0.13 of a second, outside his entry time of 2:04.64. Andrijauskas failed to advance into the semifinals, as he placed thirtieth overall in the preliminaries.
