= Aminata Barrow =

Gambian swimmer (born 2004)

Amie Barrow
Personal information
- Full name: Aminata Nia-Maria Barrow
- Nationality: Gambian
- Born: 2 January 2004 (age 22) Northampton, United Kingdom
- Height: 5 ft 9 in (175 cm)

Sport
- Sport: Swimming
- Strokes: Breaststroke, Individual Medley
- College team: Brown Bears

Aminata (Amie) Nia-Maria Barrow (born 2 January 2004) is a Gambian competitive swimmer. She qualified to represent The Gambia at the 2024 Summer Olympics. Amie holds current national records in the 50, 100, and 200 meter breaststroke, 50 freestyle, 50 and 100 butterfly, and 200 meter individual medley.

== Biography ==
Barrow was born in the United Kingdom; her father is from The Gambia and her mother is from Finland. Her family moved to the United States when she was age eight, settling in Shorewood, Wisconsin. She started swimming at three months old with Aqualight and began swimming competitively once she moved to the United States. She competed for Shorewood Swim Club under coach Dave Wesfahl and later at Shorewood High School. At Shorewood, she was a top student-athlete and competed on the swim team for four years, helping the high school's team be runner-up at the 2020 state championships while Barrow won an individual state high school championship in 2021, in the 100-yard breaststroke. In 2022, Barrow competed at the USA Swimming Wisconsin championships and won the 100- and 200-meter breaststroke events. Barrow graduated from Shorewood in 2022.

Barrow began swimming for the Brown Bears team in 2022. She made the Ivy Championship team all four years, and participated in eight meets during the 2022–23 season; she competed in the 100 and 200 breaststroke and 200 individual medley events. She competed at the Ivy League championships and placed 16th in the 100 breaststroke. In her sophomore year, she competed in seven meets and set her personal bests in the 100 and 200 breaststrokes. She competed at the Ivy League championships and placed 13th in the 100 breaststroke and seventh in the 200 breaststroke.

Barrow qualified for the 2023 World Aquatics Championships representing The Gambia, becoming the first female swimmer to compete at the event for the nation. In her international debut, she managed to set the national records in the 100- and 200-meter breaststroke events. The following year, she was selected to represent The Gambia at the 2024 Summer Olympics, becoming The Gambia's first female Olympic swimmer.
