= Paulius Viktoravičius =

Lithuanian swimmer (born 1984)

Personal information
- Full name: Paulius Viktoravičius
- National team: Lithuania
- Born: 4 November 1984 (age 41) Šiauliai, Lithuanian SSR, Soviet Union
- Education: Delfinas
- Height: 1.93 m (6 ft 4 in)
- Weight: 95 kg (209 lb)

Sport
- Sport: Swimming
- Strokes: Freestyle

Paulius Viktoravičius (born 4 November 1984) is a Lithuanian swimmer, who specialized in sprint and relay freestyle events. He is a multiple-time Lithuanian swimming champion and record holder in both the freestyle and medley relay events.

Viktoravicius made his first Lithuanian team at the 2004 Summer Olympics in Athens, competing in the men's 4 × 100 m freestyle relay, along with his teammates Saulius Binevičius, Vytautas Janušaitis, and Rolandas Gimbutis. Swimming the third leg, Viktoravicius recorded a split of 50.20 seconds, and the Lithuanian team went on to finish heat two in sixth place and eleventh overall, for a total time of 3:19.28.

At the 2008 Summer Olympics in Beijing, Viktoravicius qualified as an individual swimmer for the men's 100 m freestyle, by clearing a FINA B-standard entry time of 49.93 from the European Championships in Eindhoven, Netherlands. He challenged seven other swimmers on the fifth heat, including Czech Republic's Martin Verner and Shaune Fraser of the Cayman Islands. Viktoravicius raced to a second-place tie with Hungary's Balázs Makány, sharing their time at 49.27 seconds. Viktoravicius, however, failed to advance into the semifinals, as he placed twenty-eighth overall in the evening preliminaries.

At the 2009 FINA World Championships in Rome, Italy, Viktoravicius set a Lithuanian record time of 48.84 seconds in the preliminary heats of the men's 100 m freestyle.
