= Raminta Dvariškytė =

Lithuanian swimmer

Personal information
- Full name: Raminta Dvariškytė
- National team: Lithuania
- Born: 1 February 1990 (age 36) Vilnius, Lithuanian SSR, Soviet Union
- Height: 1.72 m (5 ft 8 in)
- Weight: 63 kg (139 lb)

Sport
- Sport: Swimming
- Strokes: Breaststroke
- Club: Vilniaus Vandens Sporto; Mokykla (LTU)
- College team: Southern Methodist University (U.S.)

Raminta Dvariškytė (born 1 February 1990) is a Lithuanian swimmer who specialized in breaststroke events. She represented her nation Lithuania at the 2008 Summer Olympics, and has claimed multiple Lithuanian championship titles and two national records in both the breaststroke and medley relay events.

Dvariskyte competed for Lithuania in the women's 200 m breaststroke at the 2008 Summer Olympics in Beijing. Leading up to the Games, she fired off her own lifetime best in 2:33.35 to clear an insurmountable FINA B-cut by just 0.07 of a second at the European Championships in Eindhoven, Netherlands. Dvariskyte topped the field in heat one by approximately five seconds ahead of Finland's Noora Laukkanen and Brazil's Tatiane Sakemi in 2:33.32, slicing 0.03 seconds off her lifetime best from the Europeans five months earlier. Dvariskyte failed to advance into the semifinals, as she placed thirty-fifth overall out of forty-one swimmers in the prelims.

At the 2009 FINA World Championships in Rome, Italy, Dvariskyte helped out her team to set two Lithuanian records in the preliminary heats of both freestyle and medley relays, clocking at 3:54.97 and 4:12.30, respectively.

Dvariškytė is a member of the swimming team, along with her compatriot Mindaugas Sadauskas for the SMU Mustangs, and also a student in real estate and finance at Southern Methodist University in Dallas, Texas.

She is married to Omar Andrés Pinzón García, a Colombian swimmer who represented Colombia in the 2004 and 2008 olympics, they have a son named Lucas Pinzón.
