= Indrė Girdauskaitė =

Lithuanian diver (born 1998)

Personal information
- Full name: Indrė Marija Girdauskaitė
- Nationality: Lithuanian
- Born: 28 April 1998 (age 28)

Sport
- Country: Lithuania
- Sport: Diving
- Event(s): 1 m, 3 m

Indrė Marija Girdauskaitė (born 28 April 1998) is a Lithuanian female diver that specialises in springboard events.

== Career ==
Indrė Girdauskaitė competed in 2015 World Aquatics Championships, where she finished 34th and 42nd in individual events. In 2017 World Aquatics Championships Girduskaitė together with Genevieve Angerame was a first Lithuanian female duo to compete in synchronised diving event and finished in 18th place.

In 2019, she finished in 40th place in the preliminary round in the women's 1 metre springboard event at the 2019 World Aquatics Championships held in Gwangju, South Korea. In the women's 3 metre springboard event she finished in 48th place in the preliminary round.
