= Tadas Duškinas =

Lithuanian swimmer (born 1994)

Personal information
- Born: 27 April 1994 (age 32)

Sport
- Sport: Swimming

Tadas Duškinas (born 27 April 1994) is a Lithuanian swimmer. He competed in the men's 50 metre butterfly event at the 2017 World Aquatics Championships. In 2019, he represented Lithuania at the 2019 World Aquatics Championships held in Gwangju, South Korea.

In 2025 Duškinas awarded Coach of the Year award during Lithuanian Sport Awards ceremony for coaching Rūta Meilutytė and Kotryna Teterevkova.
