= Rolandas Gimbutis =

Lithuanian swimmer (born 1981)

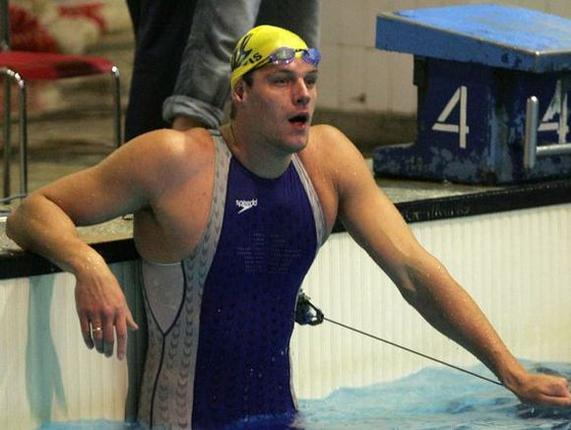

Personal information
- Nationality: Lithuania
- Born: 11 February 1981 (age 45) Vilnius, Lithuanian SSR, Soviet Union
- Height: 2.09 m (6 ft 10 in)
- Weight: 112 kg (247 lb)

Sport
- Sport: Swimming
- Strokes: Freestyle
Medal record
European SC Championships
| Bronze medal – third place | 2002 Riesa | 50 m freestyle |

Rolandas Gimbutis (born 11 February 1981 in Vilnius, Lithuania) is a swimmer from Lithuania. He participated in the 2000, 2004, and 2008 Summer Olympics.

== Oakland Undercurrent ==
Currently, Rolandas is a swim coach for the well-known Oakland Undercurrents.
