= Saulius Binevičius =

Lithuanian swimmer (born 1979)

Personal information
- Nationality: Lithuania
- Born: 23 January 1979 (age 47) Kaunas, Lithuanian SSR, Soviet Union
- Height: 2.06 m (6 ft 9 in)

Sport
- Sport: Swimming
Medal record
European Championships (SC)
| Bronze medal – third place | 2003 Dublin | 200 m Freestyle |

Saulius Binevičius (born 23 January 1979 in Kaunas, Lithuanian SSR, Soviet Union) is a 3-time Olympic freestyle swimmer from Lithuania. He swam for Lithuania at the 2000, 2004 and 2008 Olympics.
