= Giedrius Titenis =

Lithuanian swimmer

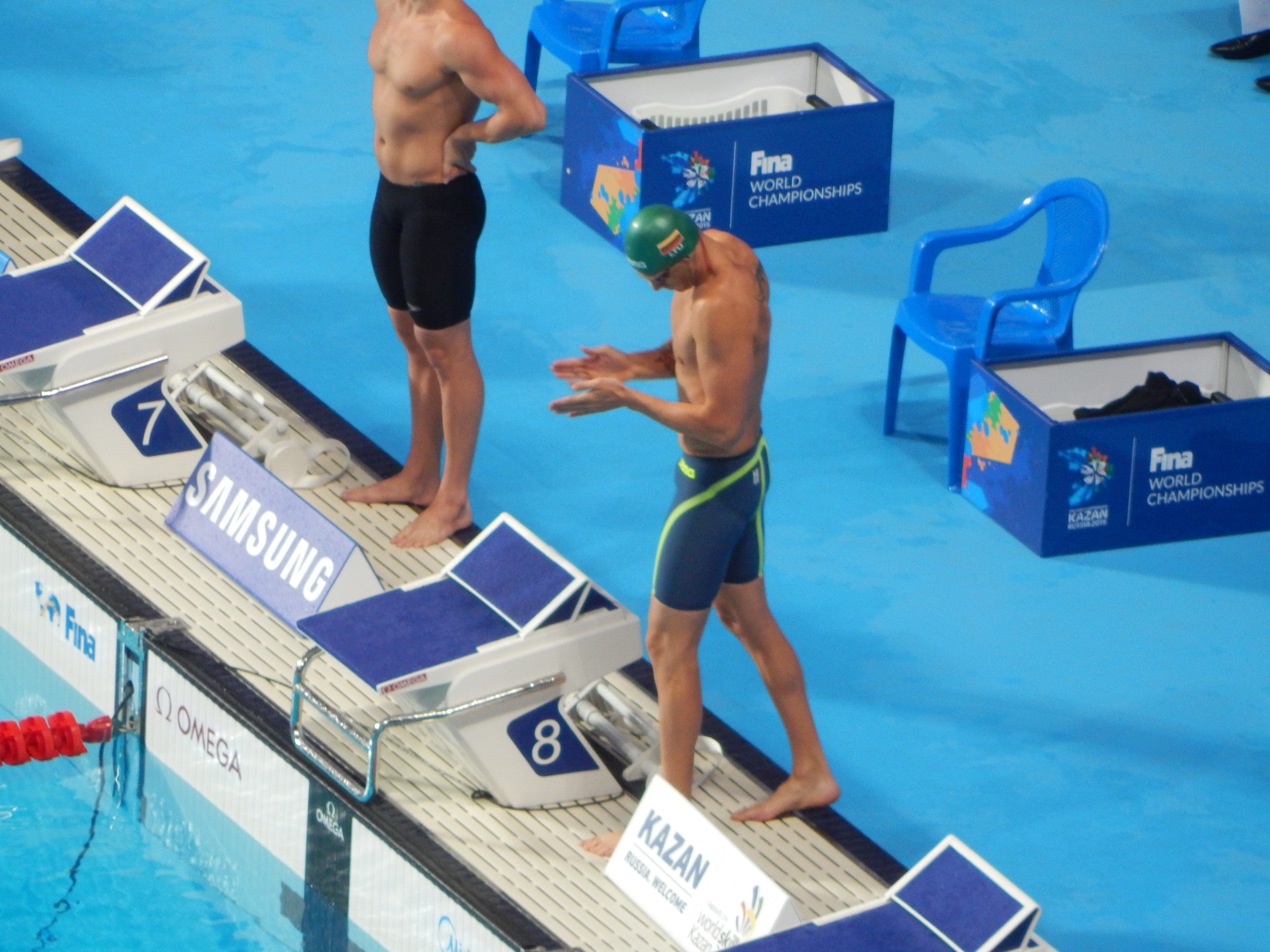

Personal information
- Nationality: Lithuanian
- Born: 21 July 1989 (age 36) Anykščiai, Lithuania
- Height: 1.93 m (6 ft 4 in)
- Weight: 85 kg (187 lb)

Sport
- Sport: Swimming
- Strokes: Breaststroke
- Club: Anykščiai SC
- Coach: Žilvinas Ovsiukas
Medal record
Men's swimming
Representing Lithuania
Event	1st	2nd	3rd
World Championships (LC)	0	0	1
European Championships (LC)	0	1	3
European Championships (SC)	0	0	1
Universiade	2	0	1
Youth World Championships	0	0	1
European Junior Championships	0	0	1
European Youth Olympic Festival	0	0	1
Total	2	1	9
World Championships (LC)
Bronze medal – third place	2009 Rome	200 m breaststroke
European Championships (LC)
Silver medal – second place	2014 Berlin	50 m breaststroke
Bronze medal – third place	2014 Berlin	100 m breaststroke
Bronze medal – third place	2014 Berlin	200 m breaststroke
Bronze medal – third place	2016 London	100 m breaststroke
European Championships (SC)
Bronze medal – third place	2015 Netanya	100 m breaststroke
Universiade
Gold medal – first place	2011 Shenzhen	100 m breaststroke
Gold medal – first place	2011 Shenzhen	200 m breaststroke
Bronze medal – third place	2009 Belgrade	200 m breaststroke
Youth World Championships (LC)
Bronze medal – third place	2006 Rio de Janeiro	200 m breaststroke
European Junior Championships (LC)
Bronze medal – third place	2007 Antwerp	100 m breaststroke
European Youth Olympic Festival
Bronze medal – third place	2005 Lignano Sabbiadoro	200 m breaststroke

Giedrius Titenis (born 21 July 1989) is a Lithuanian swimmer, who specialized in breaststroke events. He is a four-time Olympian, a multiple-time Lithuanian record holder in the men's breaststroke, and a double swimming champion in the same discipline at the 2011 Summer Universiade in Shenzhen, China. Titenis is also a member of Anykščiai Swimming Club, and is coached and trained by Žilvinas Ovsiukas.

== Swimming career ==
Titenis is considered one of Lithuania's top male swimmers, having achieved more than a hundred titles at the national championships, and having broken numerous records in men's breaststroke (50, 100, and 200 m), and medley relays (200 and 400 m). Titenis made his international debut at the 2006 FINA Youth World Swimming Championships in Rio de Janeiro, Brazil, where he earned a bronze medal in the men's 200 m breaststroke, with a time of 2:16.57. The following year, Titenis repeated his bronze medal triumph in the 100 m breaststroke at the 2007 European Junior Swimming Championships in Antwerp, Belgium, attaining his junior-best time of 1:02.51.

=== 2008 Summer Olympics ===
Titenis guaranteed his spot on the Lithuanian team for the 2008 Summer Olympics in Beijing, by obtaining an A-standard entry time of 1:00.92 (100 m breaststroke) from the 2007 FINA World Championships in Melbourne, Australia. On the first night of the Games, Titenis challenged seven other swimmers in a top seeded heat, including former Olympic medalists Roman Sludnov of Russia (2000), and Brendan Hansen of the United States (2004). He picked up a second spot by nearly half a second (0.50) behind France's Hugues Duboscq, lowering his time to 1:00.11. At the end of the evening preliminaries, Titenis recorded a sixth fastest time to advance further into the semifinals. The following morning, Titenis fell short in his bid for the final, as he placed twelfth in the semifinal run by five hundredths of a second (0.05) behind Bulgaria's Mihail Alexandrov, with a fourth slowest time of 1:00.66.

=== 2009 season ===
==== 2009 Summer Universiade ====
At the 2009 Summer Universiade in Belgrade, Serbia, Titenis set a new Lithuanian record time of 59.94 seconds in the men's 100 m breaststroke, but narrowly missed out of the medal by four hundredths of a second (0.04) behind Japan's Hiromasa Sakimoto. In his second event, 200 m breaststroke, Titenis achieved his third career bronze medal by eight hundredths of a second (0.08) ahead of Brazil's Tales Cerdeira in 2:11.14.

==== 2009 World Championships ====
Shortly after the Summer Universiade, Titenis drastically extended his swimming program by competing in all breaststroke events at the 2009 FINA World Championships in Rome. In his first event, 100 m breaststroke, Titenis out-touched Ukraine's Igor Borysik by one tenth of a second (0.10) on the morning preliminaries, lowering his national record to 59.24. He progressed further to the final round, but managed to finish only in sixth place, outside his record time of 59.27 seconds. The following morning, Titenis set his personal best time and Lithuanian record of 27.57 in the preliminary heats of his second event, 50 m breaststroke, but failed to advance into the semi-finals. For his third and final individual event, 200 m breaststroke, Titenis rebounded from his upset in two previous races, and shared a bronze medal triumph with Australian swimmer and world-record holder Christian Sprenger, clocking at 2:07.80. Two days later, Titenis joined with his fellow swimmers Paulius Viktoravičius, Vytautas Janušaitis, and Rimvydas Šalčius for the 4 × 100 m medley relay. Swimming the breaststroke leg, Titenis recorded a time of 59.26, and the Lithuanian team went on to finish the preliminary heats in fourth place and fifteenth overall, setting a new Lithuanian record time of 3:35.40.

At the 2009 European Short Course Swimming Championships in Istanbul, Turkey, Titenis set short-course Lithuanian records of 58.03 and 2:07.65 in the men's 100 and 200 m breaststroke, respectively, but failed to advance into the final round.

=== 2011 season ===
At the 2011 FINA World Championships in Shanghai, Titenis competed for the second time in all breaststroke events. For his first event, 100 m breaststroke, Titenis finished in a sixth-place tie with Hungary's Dániel Gyurta, with a time of 1:00.25. The following morning, Titenis failed to improve both his performance and a national record of 27.57 seconds in the preliminary heats of the 50 m breaststroke, with a time of 28.14. For his third and final individual event, 200 m breaststroke, Titenis recorded a fastest time of 2:10.33 in the preliminary heats, but managed to finish only in sixth place on the final round by four tenths of a second (0.40) behind Great Britain's Michael Jamieson, clocking at 2:11.07.

Few weeks after the World Championships, Titenis rebounded from his loss by winning two gold medals in the same stroke at the 2011 Summer Universiade in Shenzhen, China. He tied with New Zealand's Glenn Snyders for the 200 m breaststroke title at 2:10.85, but edged him out of the gold medal in the 100 m by thirty-two hundredths of a second (0.32), posting his time of 1:00.39.

=== 2012 Summer Olympics ===
Four years after competing in his first Olympics, Titenis qualified for his second Lithuanian team, as a 23-year-old, at the 2012 Summer Olympics in London, by clearing two FINA A-standard entry times of 1:00.25 (100 m breaststroke) and 2:10.33 (200 m breaststroke), both from the 2011 FINA World Championships in Shanghai, China.

On the first day of the Olympics, Titenis recorded the third fastest qualifying time of 59.68 in the preliminary heats of the 100 m breaststroke by six hundredths of a second (0.06) behind Australia's Christian Sprenger. He lowered his time to 59.66 in the semifinals, but was unable to break a minute barrier, when he finished eighth in the final by nearly a second behind Italy's Fabio Scozzoli at 1:00.84. Achieving his best finish, Titenis became the second Lithuanian swimmer in history to reach an Olympic final since Vytautas Janušaitis did so in 2004, until his teammate Rūta Meilutytė surprisingly won the gold medal in the same stroke by the following evening.

Three days later, Titenis challenged seven other swimmers on the fifth heat of the 200 m breaststroke, including two-time Olympic champion Kosuke Kitajima of Japan. He edged out Germany's Marco Koch to snare a third spot in his heat by a quarter of a second (0.25) in 2:10.36. Titenis recorded an eighth fastest time in the preliminary heats to secure his spot for the semifinals. On the evening session, Titenis failed to qualify for the final as he finished his semifinal run in eleventh place, dipping under a 2:10 barrier and lowering his qualified entry time to 2:09.95.

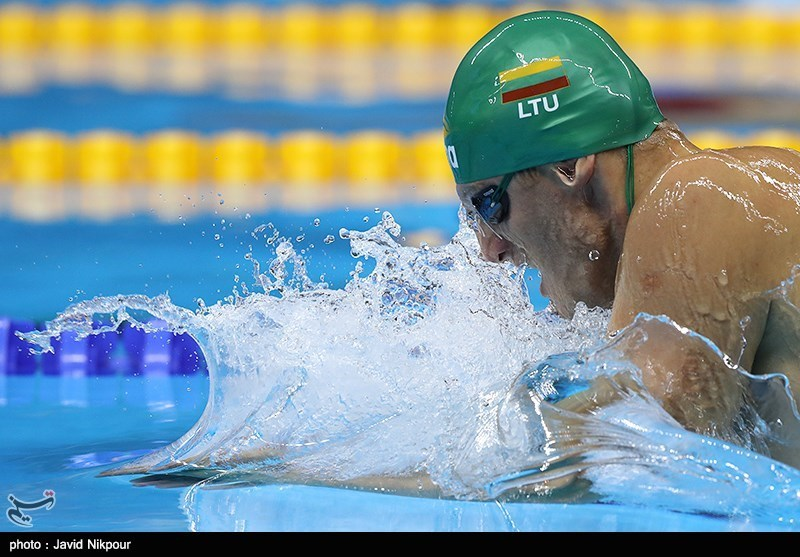
Titenis swimming in 2016.

=== 2016 Summer Olympics ===
Swimming two individual races and a relay in his third Olympics, Titenis failed to reach any finals, being at most a semifinalist in the 100 m breaststroke with 59.80.

== Personal bests ==
Long course
Event	Time	Meet
50 m breaststroke	27.57	2009 FINA World Championships
100 m breaststroke	59.24	2009 FINA World Championships
200 m breaststroke	2:07.80	2009 FINA World Championships

Short course
Event	Time	Meet
50 m breaststroke	27.37	2012 FINA World Championships (25 m)
100 m breaststroke	58.03	2009 European Championships (25 m)
200 m breaststroke	2:07.65	2009 European Championships (25 m)

== International championships (50 m) ==
Meet	50 free	50 breast	100 breast	200 breast	4×100 medley
EC 2006	50th	51st	53rd	35th	
WC 2007	60th	31st	12th	32nd	14th
EC 2008		38th	25th	27th	14th
OG 2008		—N/a	12th		
WC 2009		20th	6th	3rd place, bronze medalist(s)	15th
EC 2010		13th	5th	12th	9th
WC 2011		19th	6th	6th	17th
OG 2012		—N/a	8th	11th	
WC 2013		29th	12th	11th	13th
EC 2014		2nd place, silver medalist(s)	3rd place, bronze medalist(s)	3rd place, bronze medalist(s)	7th
WC 2015		5th	6th	11th	12th
EC 2016			4th	3rd place, bronze medalist(s)	5th
OG 2016		—N/a	10th	22nd	14th
WC 2017		14th	12th	21st	
EC 2018		19th	11th	20th	
WC 2019		25th	21st	18th	
EC 2020		18th	20th	12th	
OG 2020		—N/a	36th		
