= Vytautas Janušaitis =

Lithuanian swimmer (born 1981)

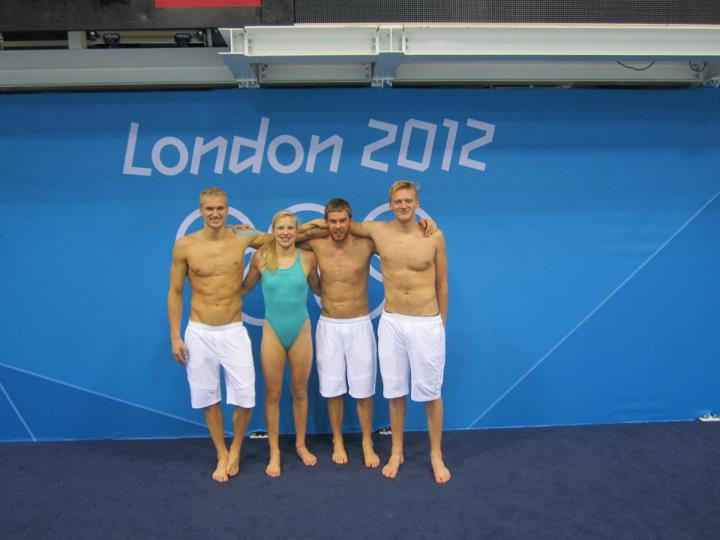

Personal information
- Nationality: Lithuania
- Born: October 13, 1981 (age 44) Kaunas, Lithuanian SSR, Soviet Union
- Height: 186 cm (6 ft 1 in)
- Weight: 81 kg (179 lb)

Sport
- Sport: Swimming
Medal record
European Championships (LC)
Bronze medal – third place	2008 Eindhoven	200 m medley
European Championships (SC)
Silver medal – second place	2005 Trieste	200 m medley
Silver medal – second place	2006 Helsinki	100 m medley
Silver medal – second place	2006 Helsinki	200 m medley
Silver medal – second place	2008 Rijeka	200 m medley
Silver medal – second place	2009 Istanbul	200 m medley
Silver medal – second place	2010 Eindhoven	200 m medley
Bronze medal – third place	2004 Vienna	200 m medley
Bronze medal – third place	2005 Trieste	100 m medley

Vytautas Janušaitis (born October 13, 1981 in Kaunas) is an Olympic medley swimmer from Lithuania, who represented his home country at the 2004, 2008 and 2012 Summer Olympics.

He participated at every edition of the European Short Course Championships from 2004 to 2010.

He swam at the 2003 World University Games.
