= LTU Aquatics =

Association LTU Aquatics Asociacija LTU Aquatics
- Sport: Swimming, diving, artistic swimming and open water swimming
- Founded: 1924
- Affiliation: World Aquatics; European Aquatics; National Olympic Committee of Lithuania
- Location: Kaunas, Lithuania
- President: Saulius Binevičius (acting)
- Vice president(s): Romanas Teličėnas; Eugenijus Rakitinas
- Secretary: Justas Kalinauskas

Official website
- www.ltuaquatics.com

The LTU Aquatics (formerly Lithuanian Swimming Federation, Lithuanian: Lietuvos plaukimo federacija, LPF) is the national governing body for aquatic sports in Lithuania, including swimming, diving, artistic swimming, and open water swimming. It is a non-profit organization that was founded in 1924. During Soviet Union occupation federation was closed and re-founded in 1991. It is a member of both European Aquatics and World Aquatics.

On 29 May 2023, the Lithuanian Swimming Federation changed its official name to LTU Aquatics.

== Organization ==
- President: Saulius Binevičius
- First Vice President: Romanas Teličėnas
- Vice President: Eugenijus Rakitinas
- General Secretary: Justas Kalinauskas

== Competitions ==
The LTU Aquatics organizes the Lithuanian Swimming Championships, the Lithuanian Artistic Swimming Championships, the Lithuanian Diving Championships, and the Lithuanian Open Water Swimming Championships, national junior and youth championships.

== Medalists at Olympic Games ==
#	Swimmer	Gold	Silver	Bronze	Total
Breaststroke
1	Rūta Meilutytė	1	0	0	1

== Medalists at World Championships ==
LONG course
#	Swimmer	Gold	Silver	Bronze	Total
Freestyle
1	Raimundas Mažuolis	0	0	1	1
Breaststroke
1	Rūta Meilutytė	3	2	1	6
2	Giedrius Titenis	0	0	1	1
SHORT course
#	Swimmer	Gold	Silver	Bronze	Total
Freestyle
1	Danas Rapšys	1	1	0	2
2	Simonas Bilis	1	0	1	2
Breaststroke
1	Rūta Meilutytė	3	3	0	6

== See also ==
- List of Lithuanian records in swimming
- Lithuanian Swimming Championships
