= Danas Rapšys =

Lithuanian swimmer (born 1995)

Personal information
- Nationality: Lithuanian
- Born: 21 May 1995 (age 31) Panevėžys, Lithuania
- Height: 1.86 m (6 ft 1 in)
- Weight: 80 kg (176 lb)

Sport
- Sport: Swimming
- Strokes: Backstroke, freestyle
- Club: Panevėžio Žemyna
- Coach: Ina Šimeliūnaitė-Paipelienė
Medal record
Men's swimming
Representing Lithuania
Event	1st	2nd	3rd
World Championships (LC)	0	1	0
World Championships (SC)	1	2	2
European Championships (LC)	1	2	2
European Championships (SC)	3	1	3
Universiade	2	0	1
World Junior Championships	0	2	0
European Junior Championships	1	1	1
European Youth Olympic Festival	0	1	0
Total	8	10	9
World Championships (LC)
Silver medal – second place	2024 Doha	200 m freestyle
World Championships (SC)
Gold medal – first place	2018 Hangzhou	400 m freestyle
Silver medal – second place	2018 Hangzhou	200 m freestyle
Silver medal – second place	2021 Abu Dhabi	400 m freestyle
Bronze medal – third place	2021 Abu Dhabi	200 m freestyle
Bronze medal – third place	2022 Melbourne	400 m freestyle
European Championships (LC)
Gold medal – first place	2024 Belgrade	4x200 m freestyle
Silver medal – second place	2024 Belgrade	200 m freestyle
Silver medal – second place	2018 Glasgow	200 m freestyle
Bronze medal – third place	2016 London	200 m backstroke
Bronze medal – third place	2020 Budapest	400 m freestyle
European Championships (SC)
Gold medal – first place	2017 Copenhagen	200 m freestyle
Gold medal – first place	2019 Glasgow	200 m freestyle
Gold medal – first place	2019 Glasgow	400 m freestyle
Silver medal – second place	2023 Otopeni	400 m freestyle
Bronze medal – third place	2023 Otopeni	200 m freestyle
Bronze medal – third place	2023 Otopeni	200 m medley
Bronze medal – third place	2017 Copenhagen	200 m backstroke
Summer Universiade
Gold medal – first place	2017 Taipei	200 m freestyle
Gold medal – first place	2017 Taipei	200 m backstroke
Bronze medal – third place	2017 Taipei	100 m backstroke
World Junior Championships
Silver medal – second place	2013 Dubai	100 m backstroke
Silver medal – second place	2013 Dubai	4×100 m mixed medley
European Junior Championships
Gold medal – first place	2013 Poznan	200 m backstroke
Silver medal – second place	2013 Poznan	100 m backstroke
Bronze medal – third place	2012 Antwerp	200 m backstroke
European Youth Olympic Festival
Silver medal – second place	2011 Trabzon	200 m backstroke

Danas Rapšys (Lithuanian pronunciation: [ˈdaːnɐs rɐpˈɕiːs]; born 21 May 1995) is a Lithuanian swimmer. He is a two-time Olympian, a multiple-time Lithuanian record holder in the men's backstroke, freestyle and butterfly, and a double swimming champion at the 2017 Summer Universiade in Taipei, Taiwan. Rapšys is also a member of Panevežys Žemyna Club, and is coached and trained by Ina Paipelienė.

== 2013 season ==
In 2013 he became a European Junior champion. At the 2013 FINA World Junior Swimming Championships in Dubai, United Arab Emirates, Rapšys competed in 4×100 metre mixed medley with Rūta Meilutytė, Povilas Strazdas, Eva Gliožerytė. During 4×100 metre mixed medley heats, they finished third with a time of 3:55.74 seconds and qualified to the final. At the 4×100 metre mixed medley final, Meilutyte, Rapšys, Strazdas and Gliožerytė finished second and won silver medal with a time of 3:52.52 seconds. In the 2013 World Aquatics Championships he reached semifinals in the 200m backstroke swimming.

== 2017 season ==
=== 2017 Summer Universiade ===
At the 2017 Summer Universiade in Taipei, Taiwan, Rapšys competed in four events: the 100 metre backstroke, 200 metre freestyle, 200 metre backstroke and 4 × 100 m medley relay.

In his first event, 100 m backstroke, Rapšys achieved bronze medal, with a time of 54:17, but narrowly missed out of the silver medal by five hundredths of a second (0.05) behind Japan's Kosuke Hagino. Rapšys won gold medal in the 200 metre freestyle finals, with a time of 1:45.75, and broke the national Lithuanian swimming record. He also competed in the 200 m backstroke final where he sat in 7th through the halfway point, but made big moves on the back half, including a 28.87 on the final 50, to pull ahead of the field for gold in 1:56.52.

== 2022 season ==
At the 2022 World Short Course Championships, contested in December at Melbourne Sports and Aquatic Centre in Melbourne, Australia, Rapšys won the bronze medal in the 400 metre freestyle with a time of 3:36.26, which was less than two seconds behind gold medalist Kieran Smith of the United States. In the 200 metre freestyle on the sixth and final day of competition, he ranked fifth in the preliminaries with a time of 1:42.21 before placing seventh in the final with a time of 1:41.74.

== Personal bests ==
As of 12 August 2019

Long course
Event	Time	Meet
50 m freestyle	23.16	2015 Dzukija Cup
100 m freestyle	49.04	2019 FINA Swimming World Cup
200 m freestyle	1:44.38 NR	2019 FINA Swimming World Cup
400 m freestyle	3:43.36 NR	2019 FINA Champion Series Budapest
800 m freestyle	7:59.34 NR	Swim Open Stockholm 2019
100 m backstroke	53.79 NR	2017 Romanian International Championships
200 m backstroke	1:56.11 NR	2017 World Aquatics Championships

Short course
Event	Time	Meet
200 m freestyle	1:40.85 NR	2017 European Short Course Swimming Championships
400 m freestyle	3:33.20 NR	2019 European Short Course Swimming Championships
800 m freestyle	7:57.72 NR	2017 Lithuanian Championships (25 m)
100 m backstroke	50.95 NR	2014 FINA World Swimming Championships (25 m)
200 m backstroke	1:49.06 NR	2017 European Short Course Swimming Championships
100 m butterfly	50.79 NR	2017 Lithuanian Swimming Federation Cup
200 m butterfly	1:54.35	2017 European Short Course Swimming Championships

== International championships (50 m) ==
Meet	50 free	200 free	400 free	50 back	100 back	200 back	100 fly	200 medley	4×100 free	4×200 free	4×100 medley	4×100 mixed medley
Junior level
EJC 2012	25th				7th	3rd place, bronze medalist(s)			10th		8th	—N/a
EJC 2013					2nd place, silver medalist(s)	1st place, gold medalist(s)					4th	
WJC 2013				7th	2nd place, silver medalist(s)	5th						2nd place, silver medalist(s)
Senior level
EC 2012		35th			35th	30th						—N/a
WC 2013					25th	14th					13th	—N/a
EC 2014					22nd	5th			7th		7th	
WC 2015					28th	19th					12th	
EC 2016						3rd place, bronze medalist(s)					5th	
OG 2016				—N/a	24th	21st					14th	—N/a
WC 2017		10th				8th					17th	
WUG 2017		1st place, gold medalist(s)			3rd place, bronze medalist(s)	1st place, gold medalist(s)					7th	—N/a
EC 2018		2nd place, silver medalist(s)					29th		13th	12th	4th	
WC 2019		8th^{[a]}	4th			15th					11th	
EC 2020		4th	3rd place, bronze medalist(s)								9th	
OG 2020		8th	13th	—N/a				33rd			15th^{[b]}	
WC 2022		14th	18th								19th^{[b]}	
EC 2022		5th								10th	11th	

^{a} Rapšys was disqualified in the final.
^{b} Team Lithuania was disqualified in the preliminaries.

== International championships (25 m) ==
Meet	100 free	200 free	400 free	50 back	100 back	200 back	200 fly	100 medley	200 medley	4×50 free	4×200 free	4×50 medley	4×100 medley
EC 2012		37th		DNS	27th	18th					—N/a		—N/a
WC 2012	56th			36th	39th	23rd							
EC 2013		18th		30th	11th	5th				6th	—N/a		—N/a
WC 2014					13th	9th			DSQ			7th	11th
EC 2015				21st	10th	4th		21st			—N/a	6th	—N/a
WC 2016		18th		22nd	12th	5th						8th	
EC 2017	20th	1st place, gold medalist(s)				3rd place, bronze medalist(s)	11th				—N/a	9th	—N/a
WC 2018	16th	2nd place, silver medalist(s)	1st place, gold medalist(s)			14th					9th		7th
EC 2019		1st place, gold medalist(s)	1st place, gold medalist(s)				DNS	DNS	DNS		—N/a		—N/a
WC 2021		3rd place, bronze medalist(s)	2nd place, silver medalist(s)							7th		8th	7th
WC 2022		7th	3rd place, bronze medalist(s)										
EC 2023		3rd place, bronze medalist(s)	2nd place, silver medalist(s)						3rd place, bronze medalist(s)		—N/a		—N/a

Awards
Preceded by Andrius Gudžius	Lithuanian Sportsman of the Year; 2019	Succeeded by Mindaugas Griškonis
