= Latvia at the 2025 World Aquatics Championships =

- Flag of Latvia
- World Aquatics code: LAT
- National federation: Swimming Federation of Latvia
- Website: swimming.lv

in Singapore
- Competitors: 3 in 1 sport
- Medals: Gold 0 Silver 0 Bronze 0 Total 0

World Aquatics Championships appearances
- 1994; 1998; 2001; 2003; 2005; 2007; 2009; 2011; 2013; 2015; 2017; 2019; 2022; 2023; 2024; 2025

Other related appearances
- Soviet Union (1973–1991)

Latvia is competing at the 2025 World Aquatics Championships in Singapore from 11 July to 3 August 2025.

== Competitors ==
The following is the list of competitors in the Championships.

Sport	Men	Women	Total
Swimming	3	0	3
Total	3	0	3

== Swimming ==
Men

Athlete	Event	Heat		Semifinal		Final	
Athlete	Event	Time	Rank	Time	Rank	Time	Rank
Daniils Bobrovs	100 m breaststroke	1:03.19	50	Did not advance			
Daniils Bobrovs	200 m breaststroke	2:16.22	31	Did not advance			
Nikolass Deicmans	100 m backstroke	57.18	51	Did not advance			
Nikolass Deicmans	200 m backstroke	2:02.50	36	Did not advance			
Janis Dzirkalis	50 m freestyle	22.27 NR	32	Did not advance			
Janis Dzirkalis	100 m freestyle	49.86	41	Did not advance			
