= Latvia at the 2017 World Aquatics Championships =

- Flag of Latvia
- FINA code: LAT
- National federation: Latvijas Peldēšanas federācija
- Website: www.swimming.lv

in Budapest, Hungary
- Competitors: 7 in 1 sport
- Medals: Gold 0 Silver 0 Bronze 0 Total 0

World Aquatics Championships appearances
- 1994; 1998; 2001; 2003; 2005; 2007; 2009; 2011; 2013; 2015; 2017; 2019; 2022; 2023; 2024

Other related appearances
- Soviet Union (1973–1991)

Latvia competed at the 2017 World Aquatics Championships in Budapest, Hungary from 14 July to 30 July.

== Swimming ==
Latvian swimmers have achieved qualifying standards in the following events (up to a maximum of 2 swimmers in each event at the A-standard entry time, and 1 at the B-standard):

Men

Athlete	Event	Heat		Semifinal		Final	
Athlete	Event	Time	Rank	Time	Rank	Time	Rank
Daniils Bobrovs	100 m breaststroke	1:03.46	50	did not advance			
Daniils Bobrovs	200 m breaststroke	2:16.86	30	did not advance			
Girts Feldbergs	50 m backstroke	26.27	39	did not advance			
Girts Feldbergs	100 m backstroke	56.24	32	did not advance			
Uvis Kalniņš	200 m individual medley	2:03.66	30	did not advance			
Nikolajs Maskaļenko	50 m breaststroke	28.27	38	did not advance			
Nikolajs Maskaļenko	50 m butterfly	24.63	=41	did not advance			
Daniils Bobrovs; Girts Feldbergs; Uvis Kalniņš; Nikolajs Maskaļenko	4×100 m freestyle relay	3:24.40	18	—		did not advance	
Daniils Bobrovs; Girts Feldbergs; Uvis Kalniņš; Nikolajs Maskaļenko	4×100 m medley relay	3:46.26	21	—		did not advance	

Women

Athlete	Event	Heat		Semifinal		Final	
Athlete	Event	Time	Rank	Time	Rank	Time	Rank
Dana Kolidzeja	50 m breaststroke	32.59	30	did not advance			
Gabriela Ņikitina	50 m freestyle	25.78	35	did not advance			
Gabriela Ņikitina	100 m freestyle	56.77	37	did not advance			
Gabriela Ņikitina	50 m butterfly	26.95 NR	30	did not advance			
Kristina Steina	50 m backstroke	30.36	44	did not advance			
Kristina Steina	100 m backstroke	1:04.03	39	did not advance			

Mixed

Athlete	Event	Heat		Final	
Athlete	Event	Time	Rank	Time	Rank
Girts Feldbergs; Uvis Kalniņš; Gabriela Ņikitina; Kristina Steina	4×100 m freestyle relay	3:38.36	14	did not advance	
Daniils Bobrovs; Nikolajs Maskaļenko; Gabriela Ņikitina; Kristina Steina	4×100 m medley relay	4:00.70	15	did not advance	
