= List of Latvian records in swimming =

The Latvian records in swimming are the fastest ever performances of swimmers from Latvia, which are recognised and ratified by Latvijas Peldesanas Federacija (LPF).

All records were set in finals unless noted otherwise.

== Long Course (50 m) ==
=== Men ===
Event	Time		Name	Club	Date	Meet	Location	Ref
50m freestyle	22.27	h	Janis Dzirkalis	Latvia	1 August 2025	World Championships	Singapore, Singapore	
100m freestyle	49.51	h	Romāns Miloslavskis	Latvia	29 July 2009	World Championships	Rome, Italy	
200m freestyle	1:48.41		Romāns Miloslavskis	Latvia	10 Aug 2008	Olympic Games	Beijing, China	
400m freestyle	3:54.64		Romāns Miloslavskis	Liepājas KSS-EZER	24 April 2009	International Austria-Meet	Vienna, Austria	
800m freestyle	8:31.54		Artūrs Markovs	Latvia	6 July 2019	European Junior Championships	Kazan, Russia	
1500m freestyle	16:22.59		Uvis Kalniņš	Valmieras BSS	1 June 2014	Latvian Championships	Riga, Latvia	
50m backstroke	25.54		Jānis Šaltāns	Latvia	12 July 2014	European Junior Championships	Dordrecht, Netherlands	
100m backstroke	55.20		Jānis Šaltāns	Latvia	10 July 2014	European Junior Championships	Dordrecht, Netherlands	
200m backstroke	2:01.18		Nikolass Deičmans	Jelgavas SPS	23 April 2026	Lithuanian Championships	Vilnius, Lithuania	
200m backstroke	2:00.54	h, #	Nikolass Deičmans	Latvia	11 August 2026	European Championships	Paris, France	
50m breaststroke	27.82		Nikolajs Maskaļenko	SK Delfins	28 May 2017	Latvian Championships	Riga, Latvia	
100m breaststroke	1:01.88	h	Daniils Bobrovs	Latvia	17 June 2024	European Championships	Belgrade, Serbia	
200m breaststroke	2:13.34	h	Daniils Bobrovs	Latvia	19 June 2024	European Championships	Belgrade, Serbia	
50m butterfly	23.84		Dmitrijs Tolstihs	Latvia	7 March 2026	Baltic States Championships	Riga, Latvia	
100m butterfly	52.92	h	Pāvels Kondrahins	Latvia	31 July 2009	World Championships	Rome, Italy	
200m butterfly	2:04.89		Romāns Miloslavskis	Liepājas KSS-EZER	12 July 2007	Lithuanian Open Championships	Vilnius, Lithuania	
200m individual medley	2:00.39	h	Uvis Kalniņš	Latvia	5 August 2015	World Championships	Kazan, Russia	
400m individual medley	4:22.60	h	Uvis Kalniņš	Latvia	10 July 2015	Universiade	Gwangju, South Korea	
4 × 100m freestyle relay	3:24.35		Stanislavs Šakels (51.42); Reds Rullis (51.05); Nikolass Deičmans (50.84); Valerijs Čurgelis (51.04)	Latvia	24 March 2024	Baltic States Championships	Vilnius, Lithuania	
4 × 100m freestyle relay	3:22.65	h, #	Nikolass Deičmans (51.20); Valērijs Čurgelis (50.83); Emils Krampe (51.22); Janis Dzirkalis (49.40)	Latvia	13 August 2026	European Championships	Paris, France	
4 × 200m freestyle relay	7:33.34	h	Kristaps Mikelsons (1:51.34); Jegors Mihailovs (1:55.63); Ronens Kermans (1:54.63); Reds Rullis (1:51.74)	Latvia	17 June 2024	European Championships	Belgrade, Serbia	
4 × 100m medley relay	3:44.88	h	Valerijs Curgelis (56.36); Daniils Bobrovs (1:02.19); Ronens Kermans (55.72); Kristaps Mikelsons (50.61)	Latvia	23 June 2024	European Championships	Belgrade, Serbia	

Legend: # – Record awaiting ratification by LPF; WR – World record; ER – European record; e – equalled existing record;
Records not set in finals: h – heat; sf – semifinal; r – relay 1st leg; rh – relay heat 1st leg; b – B final; † – en route to final mark; so – swim-off; tt – time trial

=== Women ===
Event	Time		Name	Club	Date	Meet	Location	Ref
50m freestyle	25.58	h	Gabriela Ņikitina	Latvia	3 August 2018	European Championships	Glasgow, Great Britain	
100m freestyle	55.57	sf	Ieva Maļuka	Latvia	3 July 2019	European Junior Championships	Kazan, Russia	
200m freestyle	2:00.94	h	Ieva Maļuka	Latvia	25 July 2023	World Championships	Fukuoka, Japan	
400m freestyle	4:19.81		Ieva Maļuka	BJSS Rīdzene/OSC	28 February 2020	Latvian Championships	Riga, Latvia	
800m freestyle	9:00.41		Krista Ceplīte	Norwood	20 January 2016	South Australian State Championships	Adelaide, Australia	
1500m freestyle	17:27.28	h	Arina Baikova	Latvia	5 April 2021	Russian Championships	Kazan, Russia	
50m backstroke	29.05		Kristīna Šteins	Rigas Kipsalas PK	29 June 2016	Latvian Championships	Riga, Latvia	
100m backstroke	1:01.05		Kristīna Šteins	Latvia	7 April 2016	Canadian Olympic Trials	Toronto, Canada	
200m backstroke	2:14.00	h	Kristina Šteins	Latvia	26 July 2019	World Championships	Gwangju, South Korea	
50m breaststroke	32.00	h	Arina Sisojeva	Latvia	20 August 2019	World Junior Championships	Budapest, Hungary	
100m breaststroke	1:09.72		Arina Sisojeva	Latvia	23 April 2021	Belarusian Championships	Brest, Belarus	
200m breaststroke	2:30.82	h	Aļona Ribakova	Latvia	10 August 2016	Olympic Games	Rio de Janeiro, Brazil	
50m butterfly	26.65	h	Gabriela Ņikitina	Latvia	22 May 2021	European Championships	Budapest, Hungary	
100m butterfly	1:00.54	b	Ieva Maļuka	Unattached-AZ	12 January 2023	TYR Pro Swim Series	Knoxville, United States	
200m butterfly	2:14.90		Ieva Maļuka	Athens Bulldog	16 May 2025	Bulldog Grand Slam	Athens, United States	
200m butterfly	2:13.95	h, #	Ieva Maļuka	Latvia	15 August 2026	European Championships	Paris, France	
200m individual medley	2:14.18	c	Ieva Maļuka	Unattached Sun Devil	1 December 2023	U.S. Open	Greensboro, United States	
200m individual medley	2:14.09	sf, #	Ieva Maļuka	Latvia	14 August 2026	European Championships	Paris, France	
400m individual medley	4:49.76		Ieva Maļuka	Athens Bulldog	5 December 2025	U.S. Open	Austin, United States	
400m individual medley	4:48.50	h, #	Ieva Maļuka	Latvia	12 August 2026	European Championships	Paris, France	
4 × 100m freestyle relay	3:49.99	h	Ieva Maļuka (56.12); Gabriela Ņikitina (56.85); Annika Baikova (56.85); Arina Sisojeva (1:00.17)	Latvia	17 May 2021	European Championships	Budapest, Hungary	
4 × 200m freestyle relay	8:51.90		Ieva Maļuka (2:01.44); Jekaterina Gaidamanova (2:15.34); Daniela Berzina (2:17.98); Kristiana Maskava (2:17.14)	BJSS Ridzene/OSC	29 February 2020	Latvian Championships	Riga, Latvia	
4 × 100m medley relay	4:11.57	h	Arina Baikova (1:03.11); Arina Sisojeva (1:10.07); Ieva Maļuka (1:02.23); Gabriela Ņikitina (56.16)	Latvia	23 May 2021 (Note: 24 May 2021 by federation source, a typo)	European Championships	Budapest, Hungary	

Legend: # – Record awaiting ratification by LPF; WR – World record; ER – European record; e – equalled existing record;
Records not set in finals: h – heat; sf – semifinal; r – relay 1st leg; rh – relay heat 1st leg; b – B final; † – en route to final mark; so – swim-off; tt – time trial

=== Mixed relay ===
Event	Time		Name	Nationality	Date	Meet	Location	Ref
4 × 100m freestyle relay	3:37.66	h	Ģirts Feldbergs (51.91); Daniils Bobrovs (52.45); Kristina Steina (56.52); Ieva Maļuka (56.78)	Latvia	27 July 2019	World Championships	Gwangju, South Korea	
4 × 100m medley relay	3:57.77	h	Ģirts Feldbergs (55.65); Daniils Bobrovs (1:02.69); Ieva Maļuka (1:02.29); Gabriela Ņikitina (57.14)	Latvia	21 June 2022	World Championships	Budapest, Hungary	

Legend: # – Record awaiting ratification by LPF; WR – World record; ER – European record; e – equalled existing record;
Records not set in finals: h – heat; so – swim-off

== Short Course (25 m) ==
=== Men ===
Event	Time		Name	Club	Date	Meet	Location	Ref
50m freestyle	21.64		Janis Dzirkalis	SK Delfins	25 April 2025	Daugava Cup	Riga, Latvia	
100m freestyle	48.11	h	Romāns Miloslavskis	Latvia	19 December 2009	Vladimir Salnikov's Cup	Saint Petersburg, Russia	
200m freestyle	1:45.38		Romāns Miloslavskis	Latvia	14 December 2003	European Championships	Dublin, Ireland	
400m freestyle	3:51.52	h	Romāns Miloslavskis	Latvia	7 April 2006	World Championships	Shanghai, China	
800m freestyle	8:09.80	†	Jekabs Audzevics	Jelgavas SPS	27 October 2017	Internationale Neptunschwimmfest	Rostock, Germany	
1500m freestyle	15:46.31		Uvis Kalniņš	Valmiera	7 July 2012	Latvian Olympic Games	Liepāja, Latvia	
50m backstroke	24.09		Antons Voitovs	SK Delfins	1 November 2014	Latvian Sprint Championships	Riga, Latvia	
100m backstroke	51.85	sf	Andrejs Dūda	Latvia	12 December 2009	European Championships	Istanbul, Turkey	
200m backstroke	1:53.47		Nikolass Deičmans	Jelgavas SPS	12 June 2026	Latvian Championships	Jelgava, Latvia	
50m breaststroke	26.72		Nikolajs Maskalenko	SK Delfins	31 October 2014	Latvian Sprint Championships	Riga, Latvia	
100m breaststroke	58.91	h	Kristaps Mikelsons	Latvia	2 December 2025	European Championships	Lublin, Poland	
200m breaststroke	2:07.91	h	Kristaps Mikelsons	Latvia	4 December 2025	European Championships	Lublin, Poland	
50m butterfly	23.24	h	Andrejs Dūda	Latvia	13 December 2009	European Championships	Istanbul, Turkey	
100m butterfly	51.83	sf	Andrejs Dūda	Latvia	10 December 2009	European Championships	Istanbul, Turkey	
200m butterfly	1:59.57		Daniels Narajevs	Latvia	14 June 2026	Latvian Championships	Jelgava, Latvia	
200m butterfly	1:59.07	#	Daniels Narajevs	Daugavpils SS	30 October 2026	Riga Sprint	Riga, Latvia	
100m individual medley	53.19		Emils Krampe	RSS Ridzene-ZIEP	12 June 2026	Latvian Championships	Jelgava, Latvia	
200m individual medley	1:56.73	h	Kristaps Mikelsons	Latvia	5 December 2025	European Championships	Lublin, Poland	
400m individual medley	4:15.24		Uvis Kalniņš	Valmieras BSS	21 December 2017	A.Miskarov's Cup	Jelgava, Latvia	
4×50m freestyle relay	1:29.27		EAndrejs Dūda; Girts Feldbergs; T. Veinbergs; K. Ādamsons	-	4 November 2022	-	Riga, Latvia	
4 × 100m freestyle relay	3:22.14	h	Kristaps Mikelsons (49.58); Nikolass Deicmans (49.94); Daniils Bobrovs (53.10); Girts Feldbergs (49.52)	Latvia	10 December 2024 (Note: by official result source; 11 December 2024 by LPF source, a typo)	World Championships	Budapest, Hungary	
4 × 100m freestyle relay	3:19.04	not ratified	Janis Dzirkalis (49.15); Stanislavs Sakels (49.89); Arons Tods Baltaitis (49.95); Jegors Mihailovs (50.05)	SK Delfins	19 June 2025	Latvian Championships	Valmiera, Latvia	
4 × 200m freestyle relay	7:32.00		Kristofers Bregis Dags (1:55.61); Alberts Hmelevskis (1:56.33); Reds Rullis (1:51.44); Kristaps Mikelsons (1:48.62)	Valmieras BSS	18 June 2023	Latvian Championships	Valmiera, Latvia	
4×50m medley relay	1:38.23		Antons Voitovs (24.24); Nikolajs Maskaļenko (26.31); Artūrs Pesockis (24.66); Andrejs Frolovs (23.02)	SK Delfins	1 November 2014	Latvian Sprint Championships	Riga, Latvia	
4 × 100m medley relay	3:37.55		Pavels Vilcāns (53.97); Nikolajs Maskalenko (59.38); Arturs Pesockis (52.80); Deniss Akinfejevs (51.40)	Ventspils Pilseta	2 July 2016	Latvian Olympic Games	Riga, Latvia	

Legend: # – Record awaiting ratification by LPF; WR – World record; ER – European record; e – equalled existing record;
Records not set in finals: h – heat; sf – semifinal; r – relay 1st leg; rh – relay heat 1st leg; b – B final; † – en route to final mark; so – swim-off; tt – time trial

=== Women ===
Event	Time		Name	Club	Date	Meet	Location	Ref
50m freestyle	25.03		Gabriela Ņikitina	BJSS Rīdzene/OSC	24 February 2018	Latvian Championships	Riga, Latvia	
100m freestyle	54.85	h	Ieva Maļuka	BJSS Rīdzene/OSC	20 June 2021	Latvian Championships	Valmiera, Latvia	
200m freestyle	1:57.89		Ieva Maļuka	BJSS Rīdzene/OSC	17 June 2023	Latvian Championships	Valmiera, Latvia	
400m freestyle	4:15.49		Ieva Maļuka	BJSS Rīdzene/OSC	11 February 2022	Latvian Championships	Riga, Latvia	
400m freestyle	4:12.97	not ratified or later rescinded	Krista Ceplīte	Norwood	22 July 2016	South Australian State Championships	Adelaide, Australia	
800m freestyle	8:53.63		Arina Baikova	Latvia	11 October 2019	-	Kazan, Russia	
1500m freestyle	16:57.13		Krista Ceplīte	Norwood	16 July 2015	South Australian State Championships	Adelaide, Australia	
50m backstroke	27.93		Kristīna Šteins	Latvia	18 December 2016	Ulster Championships	Bangor, Great Britain	
100m backstroke	59.49		Kristīna Šteins	Latvia	7 December 2018	Invitation provinciale AA-AAA Noël	Montreal, Canada	
200m backstroke	2:09.88		Kristīna Šteins	Riga	7 November 2015	Riga Sprint	Riga, Latvia	
200m backstroke	2:09.85	#	Ieva Maļuka	PS Riga	31 October 2026	Riga Sprint	Riga, Latvia	
50m breaststroke	31.27		Dana Kolidzeja	BJSS Rīdzene/OSC	4 November 2011	Riga Sprint	Riga, Latvia	
100m breaststroke	1:07.80	h	Aļona Ribakova	Latvia	14 December 2013	European Championships	Herning, Denmark	
200m breaststroke	2:26.43		Aļona Ribakova	SK Delfins	19 February 2016	Latvian Championship	Riga, Latvia	
50m butterfly	26.44		Gabriela Ņikitina	Swimming Club OLIMP	23 December 2017	Vladimir Salnikov Cup	Saint Petersburg, Russia	
100m butterfly	59.52		Ieva Maļuka	BJSS Rīdzene/OSC	16 June 2023	Latvian Championships	Valmiera, Latvia	
200m butterfly	2:12.08		Ieva Maļuka	PS Riga	14 June 2026	Latvian Championships	Jelgava, Latvia	
100m individual medley	1:01.19	h	Ieva Maļuka	Latvia	5 December 2019	European Championships	Glasgow, Great Britain	
200m individual medley	2:13.36		Ieva Maļuka	BJSS Rīdzene/OSC	2 November 2019	International Sprint Festival	Riga, Latvia	
400m individual medley	4:41.22		Ieva Maļuka	PS Riga	13 June 2026	Latvian Championships	Jelgava, Latvia	
4×50m freestyle relay	1:46.69		K. Saida; P. A. Baumane; L. Vientiesa; E. P. Ozola	RBJSS Rīdzene	5 April 2024	-	Jelgava, Latvia	
4 × 100m freestyle relay	3:54.15		Gabriela Ņikitina (56.79); Jelena Ivanova (59.90); Laura Marija Randere (1:00.36); Aļona Ribakova (57.10)	Riga	7 July 2012	Latvian Olympic Games	Liepāja, Latvia	
4 × 200m freestyle relay	8:39.94		Liene Širjajeva; Anna Širjajeva; Anna Builo; Agnese Ozoliņa	-	1 December 2000	-	Jelgava, Latvia	
4×50m medley relay	1:56.23		Diana Ņikitina (30.38); Dana Kolidzeja (31.45); Renate Vulfa (29.35); Gabriela Ņikitina (25.05)	BJSS Rīdzene/OSC	5 November 2016	Riga Sprint	Riga, Latvia	
4 × 100m medley relay	4:15.68		Ieva Maļuka (1:00.00); Marta Valkovska (1:11.23); Daniela Berzina (1:04.01); Polina Petrova (1:00.44)	BJSS Rīdzene/OSC	16 June 2023	Latvian Championships	Valmiera, Latvia	

Legend: # – Record awaiting ratification by LPF; WR – World record; ER – European record; e – equalled existing record;
Records not set in finals: h – heat; sf – semifinal; r – relay 1st leg; rh – relay heat 1st leg; b – B final; † – en route to final mark; so – swim-off; tt – time trial

=== Mixed relay ===
Event	Time		Name	Nationality	Date	Meet	Location	Ref
4×50 m freestyle relay	1:35.42	h	Nikolajs Maskalenko (22.44); Uvis Kalniņš (22.02); Kristina Silvia Steina (25.56); Gabriela Ņikitina (25.40)	Latvia	7 December 2016	World Championships	Windsor, Canada	
4×50 m medley relay	1:43.79	h	Kristina Silvia Steina (28.46); Nikolajs Maskalenko (26.40); Gabriela Ņikitina (26.96); Uvis Kalniņš (21.97)	Latvia	8 December 2016	World Championships	Windsor, Canada	

Legend: # – Record awaiting ratification by LPF; e – equalled existing record;
Records not set in finals: h – heat; so – swim-off

== See also ==
- List of Baltic records in swimming
