= Latvia at the 2013 World Aquatics Championships =

- Flag of Latvia
- FINA code: LAT
- National federation: Latvijas Peldēšanas federācija
- Website: www.swimming.lv

in Barcelona, Spain
- Competitors: 4 in 1 sports
- Medals Ranked -th: Gold 0 Silver 0 Bronze 0 Total 0

World Aquatics Championships appearances
- 1994; 1998; 2001; 2003; 2005; 2007; 2009; 2011; 2013; 2015; 2017; 2019; 2022; 2023; 2024

Other related appearances
- Soviet Union (1973–1991)

Latvia competed at the 2013 World Aquatics Championships in Barcelona, Spain from 19 July to 4 August 2013.

== Swimming ==
Latvian swimmers achieved qualifying standards in the following events (up to a maximum of 2 swimmers in each event at the A-standard entry time, and 1 at the B-standard):

Men

Athlete	Event	Heat		Semifinal		Final	
Athlete	Event	Time	Rank	Time	Rank	Time	Rank
Uvis Kalniņš	100 m freestyle	50.51	37	did not advance			
Uvis Kalniņš	200 m freestyle	1:51.91	44	did not advance			
Nikolajs Maskaļenko	50 m breaststroke	28.20	39	did not advance			
Nikolajs Maskaļenko	100 m breaststroke	1:03.28	47	did not advance			

Women

Athlete	Event	Heat		Semifinal		Final	
Athlete	Event	Time	Rank	Time	Rank	Time	Rank
Gabriela Ņikitina	50 m freestyle	26.31	39	did not advance			
Gabriela Ņikitina	50 m butterfly	27.66	35	did not advance			
Aļona Ribakova	100 m breaststroke	1:11.25	37	did not advance			
Aļona Ribakova	200 m breaststroke	2:33.07	27	did not advance			
