= Swimming at the 2017 World Aquatics Championships – Men's 4 × 100 metre medley relay =

Men's 4 × 100 metre medley relay at the 2017 World Aquatics Championships
- Venue: Danube Arena
- Location: Budapest, Hungary
- Dates: 30 July (heats and final)
- Competitors: 97 from 21 nations
- Teams: 21
- Winning time: 3:27.91

Medalists
gold medal	Matt Grevers; Kevin Cordes; Caeleb Dressel; Nathan Adrian; Ryan Murphy; Cody Miller; Tim Phillips; Townley Haas	United States
silver medal	Chris Walker-Hebborn; Adam Peaty; James Guy; Duncan Scott; Ross Murdoch	Great Britain
bronze medal	Evgeny Rylov; Kirill Prigoda; Aleksandr Popkov; Vladimir Morozov; Grigory Tarasevich; Anton Chupkov; Daniil Pakhomov; Danila Izotov	Russia

The Men's 4 × 100 metre medley relay competition at the 2017 World Championships was held on 30 July 2017.

== Records ==
Prior to the competition, the existing world and championship records were as follows.

World record	United States	3:27.28	Rome, Italy	2 August 2009
Competition record	United States	3:27.28	Rome, Italy	2 August 2009

== Results ==
=== Heats ===
The heats were held at 10:27.

Rank	Heat	Lane	Nation	Swimmers	Time	Notes
1	3	4	United States	Ryan Murphy (52.69); Cody Miller (58.99); Tim Phillips (50.74); Townley Haas (47.24)	3:29.66	Q
2	3	3	Japan	Ryosuke Irie (52.86); Yasuhiro Koseki (59.11); Yuki Kobori (51.27); Shinri Shioura (48.39)	3:31.63	Q
3	2	5	Russia	Grigory Tarasevich (53.71); Anton Chupkov (59.06); Daniil Pakhomov (51.55); Danila Izotov (47.80)	3:32.12	Q
4	2	4	Great Britain	Chris Walker-Hebborn (54.27); Ross Murdoch (59.50); James Guy (51.04); Duncan Scott (47.54)	3:32.35	Q
5	3	6	Brazil	Guilherme Guido (54.11); Felipe Lima (59.51); Henrique Martins (51.03); Bruno Fratus (47.73)	3:32.38	Q
6	3	2	Hungary	Richárd Bohus (54.01); Dániel Gyurta (1:00.23); Kristóf Milák (51.70); Dominik Kozma (47.41)	3:33.35	Q
7	2	3	China	Li Guangyuan (53.96); Yan Zibei (59.02); Li Zhuhao (51.74); Sun Yang (48.78)	3:33.50	Q
8	3	1	Belarus	Mikita Tsmyh (54.50); Ilya Shymanovich (59.03); Yauhen Tsurkin (51.45); Artsiom Machekin (48.85)	3:33.83	Q
9	3	5	Australia	Mitch Larkin (54.23); Matthew Wilson (1:00.21); David Morgan (51.56); Cameron McEvoy (47.91)	3:33.91	
10	1	4	Poland	Tomasz Polewka (54.49); Marcin Stolarski (59.78); Konrad Czerniak (51.15); Kacper Majchrzak (48.58)	3:34.00	
11	2	2	Italy	Matteo Milli (54.91); Nicolò Martinenghi (59.43); Piero Codia (51.16); Alessandro Miressi (48.61)	3:34.11	
12	2	7	Canada	Javier Acevedo (55.15); Richard Funk (59.25); Josiah Binnema (52.60); Yuri Kisil (48.14)	3:35.14	
13	2	6	Germany	Marek Ulrich (55.05); Marco Koch (1:00.02); Marius Kusch (52.17); Damian Wierling (48.02)	3:35.26	
14	3	7	Greece	Apostolos Christou (54.18); Ioannis Karpouzlis (1:01.57); Andreas Vazaios (52.45); Kristian Golomeev (47.73)	3:35.93	
15	3	9	South Africa	Martin Binedell (56.10); Cameron van der Burgh (59.77); Chad le Clos (50.99); Myles Brown (49.45)	3:36.31	
16	3	8	Ireland	Shane Ryan (54.40); Nicholas Quinn (1:00.62); Brendan Hyland (52.58); Jordan Sloan (49.01)	3:36.61	NR
17	2	1	Lithuania	Danas Rapšys (54.30); Andrius Šidlauskas (1:00.17); Deividas Margevičius (53.00); Simonas Bilis (49.28)	3:36.75	
18	1	5	Egypt	Youssef Abdalla (55.37); Marwan El-Kamash (1:02.06); Omar Eissa (54.08); Mohamed Samy (49.34)	3:40.85	NR
19	2	8	Indonesia	I Gede Siman Sudartawa (56.63); Indra Gunawan (1:03.33); Glenn Victor Sutanto (53.74); Triady Fauzi Sidiq (50.87)	3:44.57	
20	3	0	Paraguay	Charles Hockin (55.98); Renato Prono (1:03.31); Benjamin Hockin (53.41); Matías López (53.21)	3:45.91	
21	2	0	Latvia	Girts Feldbergs (55.86); Daniils Bobrovs (1:03.73); Nikolajs Maskaļenko (56.00); Uvis Kalniņš (50.67)	3:46.26	
	1	3	Kenya	DNS		
	2	9	Israel	DNS		

=== Final ===
The final was held at 19:25.

Rank	Lane	Nation	Swimmers	Time	Notes
1st place, gold medalist(s)	4	United States	Matt Grevers (52.26); Kevin Cordes (58.89); Caeleb Dressel (49.76); Nathan Adrian (47.00)	3:27.91	
2nd place, silver medalist(s)	6	Great Britain	Chris Walker-Hebborn (54.20); Adam Peaty (56.91); James Guy (50.80); Duncan Scott (47.04)	3:28.95	NR
3rd place, bronze medalist(s)	3	Russia	Evgeny Rylov (52.89); Kirill Prigoda (59.02); Aleksandr Popkov (51.16); Vladimir Morozov (46.69)	3:29.76	NR
4	5	Japan	Ryosuke Irie (52.80); Yasuhiro Koseki (58.54); Yuki Kobori (51.21); Shinri Shioura (47.64)	3:30.19	AS
5	2	Brazil	Guilherme Guido (53.53); João Gomes Júnior (58.80); Henrique Martins (51.12); Marcelo Chierighini (48.08)	3:31.53	
6	1	China	Xu Jiayu (52.89); Yan Zibei (59.02); Li Zhuhao (51.45); Yu Hexin (48.29)	3:31.65	
7	7	Hungary	Richárd Bohus (53.99); Dániel Gyurta (1:00.45); Kristóf Milák (50.97); Dominik Kozma (46.72)	3:32.13	NR
8	8	Belarus	Mikita Tsmyh (54.54); Ilya Shymanovich (58.94); Yauhen Tsurkin (51.23); Artsiom Machekin (48.92)	3:33.63	NR
