= 2023 Baltic States Swimming Championships =

- Host city: Riga, Latvia
- Date: March 3–4
- Venue: Ķīpsala Pool
- Nations: 3
- Events: 34

The 2023 Baltic States Swimming Championships was held in Riga, Latvia, between March 3 and March 4.

Some events were also held separately for youth and junior boys and girls.

The championships served as a qualifier for the Paris 2024 Olympics and the 2023 World Aquatics Championships.

The championships were won by Estonia.

== Summary ==
=== Points ===
Place	Nation	Points
1	Estonia	561.5
2	Lithuania	486
3	Latvia	231.5

=== Medal table ===
Host nation (Latvia)

Rank	Nation	Gold	Silver	Bronze	Total
1	Lithuania (LTU)	17	12	9	38
2	Estonia (EST)	11	16	15	42
3	Latvia (LAT)*	6	7	9	22
Totals (3 entries)		34	35	33	102

== Events ==
- Freestyle: 50 m, 100 m, 200 m, 400 m
- Backstroke: 50 m, 100 m, 200 m
- Breaststroke: 50 m, 100 m, 200 m
- Butterfly: 50 m, 100 m, 200 m
- Individual medley: 200 m, 400 m
- Relay: 4×100 m free, 4×100 m medley

== Results ==
=== Men's events ===
Event	Gold		Silver		Bronze	
50 m freestyle	Daniel Zaitsev (EST)	23.07	Daniil Pancerevas (LTU)	23.11	Daniil Drozdov (EST)	23.56
100 m freestyle	Daniil Pancerevas (LTU)	49.68	Kristaps Mikelsons (LAT)	51.28	Daniel Zaitsev (EST)	51.50
200 m freestyle	Danas Rapšys (LTU)	1:47.03	Daniil Pancerevas (LTU)	1:48.93	Reds Rullis (LAT)	1:55.31
400 m freestyle	Džiugas Miškinis (LTU)	4:02.56	Georg Filippov (EST)	4:07.93	Olegs Mihailovs (LAT)	4:09.43
50 m backstroke	Girts Feldbergs (LAT)	26.10	Edvinas Česnakas (LTU)	26.27	Jannes Niine (EST)	26.56
100 m backstroke	Girts Feldbergs (LAT)	56.09	Erikas Grigaitis (LTU); Kajus Stankevičius (LTU)	57.03	None awarded	
200 m backstroke	Erikas Grigaitis (LTU)	2:03.74	Kajus Stankevičius (LTU)	2:04.65	Girts Feldbergs (LAT)	2:04.79
50 m breaststroke	Ralf Roose (EST)	28.53	Daniils Bobrovs (LAT)	29.27	Rihards Kahanovics (LAT)	29.33
100 m breaststroke	Daniils Bobrovs (LAT)	1:03.32	Ralf Roose (EST)	1:03.92	Adomas Gatulis (LTU)	1:05.00
200 m breaststroke	Daniils Bobrovs (LAT)	2:15.25	Ralf Roose (EST)	2:18.68	Lars Sebastian Antoniak (EST)	2:18.84
50 m butterfly	Daniel Zaitsev (EST)	24.01	Alex Ahtiainen (EST)	24.76	Daniil Drozdov (EST)	24.78
100 m butterfly	Alex Ahtiainen (EST)	53.83	Artur Tobler (EST)	55.05	Marko-Matteus Langel (EST)	55.68
200 m butterfly	Nedas Giedraitis (LTU)	2:07.03	Emilis Atkočiūnas (LTU)	2:11.29	Elijs Aleksejevs (LAT)	2:12.04
200 m IM	Daniil Pancerevas (LTU)	2:02.83	Kristaps Mikelsons (LAT)	2:03.83	Adomas Gatulis (LTU)	2:07.95
400 m IM	Kristaps Mikelsons (LAT)	4:34.58	Nikolass Deicmans (LAT)	4:41.25	Daniil Žučkov (LTU)	4:48.02
4×100 m freestyle relay	Estonia	3:24.08	Lithuania	3:24.84	Latvia	3:28.82
4×100 m medley relay	Estonia	3:45.81	Lithuania	3:46.30	Latvia	3:46.90

=== Women's events ===
Event	Gold		Silver		Bronze	
50 m freestyle	Smiltė Plytnykaitė (LTU)	25.57	Gabriela Ņikitina (LAT)	26.37	Mariangela Boitsuk (EST)	26.47
100 m freestyle	Smiltė Plytnykaitė (LTU)	55.49	Gabriela Ņikitina (LAT)	57.70	Amelija Murėnaitė (LTU)	58.02
200 m freestyle	Ieva Visockaitė (LTU)	2:06.94	Stela Švenčionytė (LTU)	2:06.99	Karolin Victoria Kotsar (EST)	2:08.26
400 m freestyle	Stela Švenčionytė (LTU)	4:29.84	Karolin Victoria Kotsar (EST)	4:32.93	Britt Raudsepp (EST)	4:36.32
50 m backstroke	Patricija Geriksonaitė (LTU)	29.36	Mariangela Boitsuk (EST)	30.02	Ülle Harjaks (EST)	30.26
100 m backstroke	Patricija Geriksonaitė (LTU)	1:03.58	Elizabete Paula Ozola (LAT)	1:05.62	Emilija Pociūtė (LTU)	1:06.25
200 m backstroke	Patricija Geriksonaitė (LTU)	2:18.75	Beata Jakštaitė (LTU)	2:22.52	Polina Sovtsa (EST)	2:22.69
50 m breaststroke	Eneli Jefimova (EST)	31.36	Maria Romanjuk (EST)	32.17	Agnė Šeleikaitė (LTU)	32.63
100 m breaststroke	Kotryna Teterevkova (LTU)	1:07.54	Eneli Jefimova (EST)	1:07.60	Maria Romanjuk (EST)	1:08.86
200 m breaststroke	Kotryna Teterevkova (LTU)	2:25.00	Eneli Jefimova (EST)	2:29.90	Maria Romanjuk (EST)	2:31.20
50 m butterfly	Gabriela Ņikitina (LAT)	27.22	Mariangela Boitsuk (EST)	27.40	Alina Vedehhova (EST)	28.11
100 m butterfly	Alina Vedehhova (EST)	1:02.52	Miriam Jürisoo (EST)	1:03.33	Radvilė Kerševičiūtė (LTU)	1:04.02
200 m butterfly	Alina Vedehhova (EST)	2:24.21	Miriam Jürisoo (EST)	2:25.03	Radvilė Kerševičiūtė (LTU)	2:25.90
200 m IM	Laura Tammik (EST)	2:25.02	Violanta Gurjanova (EST)	2:26.19	Ieva Nainytė (LTU)	2:26.99
400 m IM	Violanta Gurjanova (EST)	5:07.46	Vytė Gelažytė (LTU)	5:13.41	Laura Tammik (EST)	5:19.04
4×100 m freestyle relay	Lithuania	3:48.93 NR	Estonia	3:54.71	Latvia	3:55.27
4×100 m medley relay	Lithuania	4:12.27 NR	Estonia	4:14.40	Latvia	4:31.39

== Sources ==
- Results
