= Latvia at the 2015 World Aquatics Championships =

- Flag of Latvia
- FINA code: LAT
- National federation: Latvijas Peldēšanas federācija
- Website: www.swimming.lv

in Kazan, Russia
- Competitors: 5 in 1 sport
- Medals: Gold 0 Silver 0 Bronze 0 Total 0

World Aquatics Championships appearances
- 1994; 1998; 2001; 2003; 2005; 2007; 2009; 2011; 2013; 2015; 2017; 2019; 2022; 2023; 2024

Other related appearances
- Soviet Union (1973–1991)

Latvia competed at the 2015 World Aquatics Championships in Kazan, Russia from 24 July to 9 August 2015.

== Swimming ==
Latvian swimmers have achieved qualifying standards in the following events (up to a maximum of 2 swimmers in each event at the A-standard entry time, and 1 at the B-standard):

Men

Athlete	Event	Heat		Semifinal		Final	
Athlete	Event	Time	Rank	Time	Rank	Time	Rank
Daniils Bobrovs	200 m breaststroke	2:14.85	31	did not advance			
Uvis Kalniņš	200 m individual medley	2:00.39	17	did not advance			
Uvis Kalniņš	400 m individual medley	4:26.17	34	—		did not advance	
Nikolajs Maskaļenko	50 m breaststroke	28.15	31	did not advance			
Nikolajs Maskaļenko	100 m breaststroke	1:03.21	48	did not advance			
Jānis Šaltāns	100 m freestyle	52.07	72	did not advance			
Jānis Šaltāns	100 m backstroke	56.15	40	did not advance			
Daniils Bobrovs; Uvis Kalniņš; Nikolajs Maskaļenko; Jānis Šaltāns	4×100 m medley relay	3:45.58	26	—		did not advance	

Women

Athlete	Event	Heat		Semifinal		Final	
Athlete	Event	Time	Rank	Time	Rank	Time	Rank
Aļona Ribakova	100 m breaststroke	1:11.45	44	did not advance			
Aļona Ribakova	200 m breaststroke	2:34.69	37	did not advance			
