= Latvia at the 2023 World Aquatics Championships =

- Flag of Latvia
- FINA code: LAT
- National federation: Swimming Federation of Latvia
- Website: swimming.lv

in Fukuoka, Japan
- Competitors: 5 in 2 sports
- Medals: Gold 0 Silver 0 Bronze 0 Total 0

World Aquatics Championships appearances
- 1994; 1998; 2001; 2003; 2005; 2007; 2009; 2011; 2013; 2015; 2017; 2019; 2022; 2023; 2024

Other related appearances
- Soviet Union (1973–1991)

Latvia competed at the 2023 World Aquatics Championships in Fukuoka, Japan from 14 to 30 July.

== Diving ==
Latvia entered 1 diver.

Women

| Athlete | Event | Preliminaries | | Semi-final | | Final | |
| Athlete | Event | Points | Rank | Points | Rank | Points | Rank |
|---|---|---|---|---|---|---|---|
| Džeja Patrika | 1 m springboard | 218.90 | 28 | — | | Did not advance | |
| Džeja Patrika | 10 m platform | 245.85 | 27 | Did not advance | | | |

== Swimming ==
Latvia entered 4 swimmers.

Men

| Athlete | Event | Heat | | Semifinal | | Final | |
| Athlete | Event | Time | Rank | Time | Rank | Time | Rank |
|---|---|---|---|---|---|---|---|
| Daniils Bobrovs | 100 metre breaststroke | 1:03.70 | 48 | Did not advance | | | |
| Daniils Bobrovs | 200 metre breaststroke | 2:15.95 | 32 | Did not advance | | | |
| Ģirts Feldbergs | 50 metre backstroke | 25.93 | 35 | Did not advance | | | |
| Ģirts Feldbergs | 100 metre backstroke | 55.91 | 36 | Did not advance | | | |
| Kristaps Mikelsons | 200 metre individual medley | 2:03.38 | 29 | Did not advance | | | |
| Kristaps Mikelsons | 400 metre individual medley | 4:36.22 | 27 | — | | Did not advance | |

Women

| Athlete | Event | Heat | | Semifinal | | Final | |
| Athlete | Event | Time | Rank | Time | Rank | Time | Rank |
|---|---|---|---|---|---|---|---|
| Ieva Maļuka | 50 metre freestyle | 26.29 | 46 | Did not advance | | | |
| Ieva Maļuka | 200 metre freestyle | 2:00.94 NR | 33 | Did not advance | | | |
| Ieva Maļuka | 200 metre individual medley | 2:15.33 NR | 23 | Did not advance | | | |
