= 2022 Lithuanian Swimming Championships =

- Host city: Klaipėda, Lithuania
- Date: April 19 – 22, 2022
- Venue: Klaipėda Swimming Pool
- Teams: 29
- Nations: 4
- Athletes: 286
- Events: 41 (men: 20; women: 20; mixed: 1)

The 2022 Lithuanian Swimming Championships was held from 19 to 22 April 2022 in Klaipėda, Lithuania at the Klaipėda Swimming Pool. Events were competed in a long course (50 metres long) swimming pool. The meet was open to international competition.

== Event schedule ==
A total of 41 events were competed over four days.

H	Heats	F	Finals

M = Morning session (starting at 11:00 - day 1; 10:00 - days 2, 3, 4), E = Evening session (starting at 18:00 - day 1; 17:00 - days 2, 3; 15:30 - day 4)

Men
Date →	Tue 19		Wed 20		Thu 21		Fri 22	
Event ↓	M	E	M	E	M	E	M	E
50 m freestyle							H	F
100 m freestyle					H	F		
200 m freestyle			H	F				
400 m freestyle	H	F						
800 m freestyle							F	
1500 m freestyle			F					
50 m backstroke			H	F				
100 m backstroke					H	F		
200 m backstroke	H	F						
50 m breaststroke							H	F
100 m breaststroke			H	F				
200 m breaststroke	H	F						
50 m butterfly	H	F						
100 m butterfly			H	F				
200 m butterfly					H	F		
200 m individual medley							H	F
400 m individual medley					H	F		
4×100 m freestyle relay						F		
4×200 m freestyle relay								F
4×100 m medley relay				F				

Women
Date →	Tue 19		Wed 20		Thu 21		Fri 22	
Event ↓	M	E	M	E	M	E	M	E
50 m freestyle					H	F		
100 m freestyle							H	F
200 m freestyle	H	F						
400 m freestyle					H	F		
800 m freestyle							F	
1500 m freestyle	F							
50 m backstroke	H	F						
100 m backstroke			H	F				
200 m backstroke					H	F		
50 m breaststroke			H	F				
100 m breaststroke							H	F
200 m breaststroke					H	F		
50 m butterfly	H	F						
100 m butterfly			H	F				
200 m butterfly								F
200 m individual medley					H	F		
400 m individual medley			H	F				
4×100 m freestyle relay						F		
4×200 m freestyle relay								F
4×100 m medley relay				F				

Mixed
Date →	Tue 19		Wed 20		Thu 21		Fri 22	
Event ↓	M	E	M	E	M	E	M	E
4×100 m medley relay		F						

== Overall results ==
Key: Highlighted swimmers achieved the "A" qualifying time for the 2022 World Aquatics Championships in the event.

=== Men's events ===
Event	Gold		Silver		Bronze	
50 m freestyle	Tomas Navikonis; Lithuania	23.12	Julius Bačkulis; Lithuania	23.15	Bohdan Shelipov; Ukraine	23.38
100 m freestyle	Tomas Navikonis; Lithuania	49.91	Daniil Pancerevas; Lithuania	50.13	Deividas Kazilas; Lithuania	50.51
200 m freestyle	Tomas Navikonis; Lithuania	1:48.46	Edvinas Česnakas; Lithuania	1:51.82	Daniil Pancerevas; Lithuania	1:52.70
400 m freestyle	Danas Rapšys; Lithuania	3:47.80	Tomas Navikonis; Lithuania	3:54.45	Nikita Ostapenko; Ukraine	3:59.86
800 m freestyle	Džiugas Miškinis; Lithuania	8:25.86	Nikita Ostapenko; Ukraine	8:29.24	Danylo Chobanian; Ukraine	8:42.61
1500 m freestyle	Džiugas Miškinis; Lithuania	16:13.76	Danylo Chobanian; Ukraine	16:37.88	Kostas Vaičiūnas; Lithuania	16:42.49
50 m backstroke	Edvinas Česnakas; Lithuania	26.22	Fen Herman; Ukraine	26.58	Eimantas Milius; Lithuania	26.79
100 m backstroke	Edvinas Česnakas; Lithuania	55.86	Erikas Grigaitis; Lithuania	55.95	Fen Herman; Ukraine	56.12
200 m backstroke	Erikas Grigaitis; Lithuania	2:00.37	Kajus Stankevičius; Lithuania	2:02.77	Fen Herman; Ukraine	2:06.70
50 m breaststroke	Andrius Šidlauskas; Lithuania	27.39	Adomas Gatulis; Lithuania	29.40	Rytis Liuberskis; Lithuania	29.49
100 m breaststroke	Andrius Šidlauskas; Lithuania	59.77	Daniils Bobrovs; Latvia	1:02.80	Aleksas Savickas; Lithuania	1:03.82
200 m breaststroke	Andrius Šidlauskas; Lithuania	2:10.56	Aleksas Savickas; Lithuania	2:13.96	Daniils Bobrovs; Latvia	2:14.12
50 m butterfly	Emils Pauls Mortuzans; Latvia	24.76	Andrii Kovalenko; Ukraine	24.83	Vladyslav Laktin; Ukraine Artem Chobotar; Ukraine	24.91
100 m butterfly	Deividas Margevičius; Lithuania	53.74	Andrii Kovalenko; Ukraine	54.66	Bohdan Tambovtsev; Ukraine	55.37
200 m butterfly	Nikita Ostapenko; Ukraine	2:04.9	Saverio Multin; Lithuania	2:05.32	Lukas Liutkevičius; Lithuania	2:09.24
200 m individual medley	Andrius Šidlauskas; Lithuania	2:02.86	Daniil Pancerevas; Lithuania	2:04.61	Eimantas Milius; Lithuania	2:05.72
400 m individual medley	Oleksandr Denysov; Ukraine	4:35.62	Nojus Skirutis; Lithuania	4:38.01	Adomas Gatulis; Lithuania	4:39.09
4×100 m freestyle relay	Panevėžio Žemyna; Tomas Lukminas (52.08); Andrius Šidlauskas (50.57); Deividas Kazilas (50.03); Tomas Navikonis (49.42)	3:22.10	Lietuvos jaunimo rinktinė Daniil Pancerevas (50.26); Kiril Stepanov (51.88); Rokas Jazdauskas (50.72); Danielis Kvederis (50.86)	3:23.72	Kauno PM; Joris Veretinskas (51.93); Kajus Stankevičius (52.43); Viktor Dudko (52.87); Erikas Grigaitis (51.45)	3:28.68
4×200 m freestyle relay	Lietuvos jaunimo rinktinė Daniil Pancerevas (1:49.46); Rokas Jazdauskas (1:54.08); Tomas Lukminas (1:55.49); Danielis Kvederis (1:53.86)	7:32.89	Panevėžio Žemyna; Tomas Navikonis (1:50.26); Deividas Kazilas (2:00.05); Matas Činga (1:54.60); Aleksas Savickas (1:57.15)	7:42.06	Kauno PM; Arnas Čereška (1:57.22); Eimantas Milius (1:57.57); Rokas Dovydaitis (1:56.97); Erikas Grigaitis (1:53.14)	7:44.90
4×100 m medley relay	Panevėžio Žemyna; Tomas Lukminas (59.45); Andrius Šidlauskas (59.33); Rokas Jazdauskas (58.18); Tomas Navikonis (49.53)	3:46.49	Lietuvos jaunimo rinktinė Kajus Stankevičius (57.23); Adomas Gatulis (1:05.62); Arnas Čereška (55.60); Daniil Pancerevas (49.88)	3:48.33	Panevėžio Žemyna; Deividas Kazilas (59.31); Aleksas Savickas (1:04.38); Nedas Giedraitis (58.06); Matas Činga (52.07)	3:53.82

=== Women's events ===
Event	Gold		Silver		Bronze	
50 m freestyle	Rūta Meilutytė; Lithuania	25.52	Ieva Maluka; Latvia	25.90	Smiltė Plytnykaitė; Lithuania	26.39
100 m freestyle	Smiltė Plytnykaitė; Lithuania	56.58	Marija Romanovskaja; Lithuania	58.13	Patricija Kondraškaitė; Lithuania	58.63
200 m freestyle	Ieva Maluka; Latvia	2:02.84	Smiltė Plytnykaitė; Lithuania	2:04.83	Vytė Gelažytė; Lithuania	2:07.75
400 m freestyle	Ieva Maluka; Latvia	4:27.88	Marija Romanovskaja; Lithuania	4:32.72	Haide Nikelis; Lithuania	4:32.97
800 m freestyle	Haide Nikelis; Lithuania	9:24.03	Avital Flaishman; Israel	9:29.92	Austė Backevičiūtė; Lithuania	9:36.58
1500 m freestyle	Avital Flaishman; Israel	18:03.05	Stela Švenčionytė; Lithuania	18:08.07	Virginija Volodkaitė; Lithuania	18:55.35
50 m backstroke	Patricija Geriksonaitė; Lithuania	30.10	Ugnė Mažutaitytė; Lithuania	30.70	Paulina Pekūnaitė; Lithuania	30.72
100 m backstroke	Paulina Pekūnaitė; Lithuania	1:04.58	Patricija Geriksonaitė; Lithuania	1:04.90; NR U15	Beata Jakštaitė; Lithuania	1:05.57
200 m backstroke	Patricija Geriksonaitė; Lithuania	2:20.78	Paulina Pekūnaitė; Lithuania	2:21.53	Beata Jakštaitė; Lithuania	2:21.75
50 m breaststroke	Agnė Šeleikaitė; Lithuania	32.22	Smiltė Plytnykaitė; Lithuania	32.74	Roksolana Suleimanova; Ukraine	33.00
100 m breaststroke	Kotryna Teterevkova; Lithuania	1:07.01	Rūta Meilutytė; Lithuania	1:07.07	Agnė Šeleikaitė; Lithuania	1:11.12
200 m breaststroke	Kotryna Teterevkova; Lithuania	2:25.21	Karilė Ališauskaitė; Lithuania	2:37.52	Guoda Stančikaitė; Lithuania	2:39.04
50 m butterfly	Smiltė Plytnykaitė; Lithuania	32.74	Anna Zahorovska; Ukraine	28.02	Kotryna Teterevkova; Lithuania	28.06
100 m butterfly	Radvilė Kerševičiūtė; Lithuania	1:02.67	Anna Zahorovska; Ukraine	1:02.80	Liepa Veronika Borevičiūtė; Lithuania	1:06.11; NR U13
200 m butterfly	Ieva Maluka; Latvia	2:21.54	Radvilė Kerševičiūtė; Lithuania	2:22.42	Anna Zahorovska; Ukraine	2:29.41
200 m individual medley	Roksolana Suleimanova; Ukraine	2:20.89	Vytė Gelažytė; Lithuania	2:24.42	Radvilė Kerševičiūtė; Lithuania	2:25.46
400 m individual medley	Kotryna Teterevkova; Lithuania	4:55.85; NR	Vytė Gelažytė; Lithuania	5:07.10	Guoda Tručinskaitė; Lithuania	5:08.45
4×100 m freestyle relay	Lietuvos jaunimo rinktinė Patricija Geriksonaitė (58.19); Patricija Kondraškaitė (58.46); Marija Romanovskaja (58.33); Smiltė Plytnykaitė (57.60)	3:52.58; NR	Sostinės SC; Stela Švenčionytė (59.21); Amelija Murėnaitė (58.49); Barbora Mileišytė (1:00.96); Elzė Morta Daunoravičiūtė (1:01.25)	3:59.91	Kauno PM; Gabija Gailiušytė (59.85); Laura Šliburytė (1:00.41); Ūla Adomaitė (1:01.16); Ieva Nainytė (1:01.17)	4:02.59
4×200 m freestyle relay	Lietuvos jaunimo rinktinė Vytė Gelažytė (2:10.91); Patricija Geriksonaitė (2:10.43); Haide Nikelis (2:10.23); Smiltė Plytnykaitė (2:09.58)	8:41.15; NR U17	Kauno PM; Ieva Visockaitė (2:11.97); Ieva Nainytė (2:13.22); Agnė Šeleikaitė (2:10.62); Rusnė Vasiliauskaitė (2:12.55)	8:48.36	Sostinės SC; Patricija Kondraškaitė (2:13.37); Amelija Murėnaitė (2:12.72); Vanesa Volodkaitė (2:12.54); Stela Švenčionytė (2:13.57)	8:52.20
4×100 m medley relay	Lietuvos jaunimo rinktinė Beata Jakštaitė (1:05.851); Smiltė Plytnykaitė (1:12.09); Radvilė Kerševičiūtė (1:02.96); Marija Romanovskaja (57.65)	4:18.55; NR U17	Sostinės SC; Stela Švenčionytė (1:09.96); Kotryna Teterevkova (1:08.13); Amelija Murėnaitė (1:06.90); Patricija Kondraškaitė (58.71)	4:23.70	Kauno PM; Ugnė Mažutaitytė (1:08.62); Agnė Šeleikaitė (1:11.71); Liepa Urbutytė (1:09.92); Gabija Gailiušytė (1:00.23)	4:30.48

=== Mixed events ===
Event	Gold		Silver		Bronze	
4×100 m medley relay	Panevėžio Žemyna; Beata Jakštaitė (1:05.55); Rokas Jazdauskas (56.94); Andrius Šidlauskas (58.92); Vytė Gelažytė (59.41)	4:00.82	Lietuvos jaunimo rinktinė Kajus Stankevičius (58.33); Arnas Čereška (55.54); Smiltė Plytnykaitė (1:10.87); Marija Romanovskaja (57.67)	4:02.41	Sostinės SC; Paulius Konstantinov (1:01.32); Ugnius Kamandulis (56.92); Kotryna Teterevkova (1:07.69); Patricija Kondraškaitė (1:00.06)	4:05.99

== Medal table ==
* Host nation (Lithuania)

Rank	Nation	Gold	Silver	Bronze	Total
1	Lithuania (LTU)*	33	31	31	95
2	Latvia (LAT)	4	2	1	7
3	Ukraine (UKR)	3	7	10	20
4	Israel (ISR)	1	1	0	2
Totals (4 entries)		41	41	42	124

== Records set ==
=== Women ===
Event	Stage	Name	Time	Date	Day	Record	Ref
400 m medley	Final	Kotryna Teterevkova	4:55.85	20 April 2022	2	Lithuanian record	
4x100 m freestyle relay	Final	Lietuvos jaunimo rinktinė Patricija Geriksonaitė (58.19); Patricija Kondraškaitė (58.46); Marija Romanovskaja (58.33); Smiltė Plytnykaitė (57.60)	3:52.58	21 April 2022	3	Lithuanian record	

== See also ==
- List of Lithuanian records in swimming
