= Latvia at the 2022 World Aquatics Championships =

- Flag of Latvia
- FINA code: LAT
- National federation: Latvijas Peldēšanas federācija
- Website: www.swimming.lv

in Budapest, Hungary
- Competitors: 5 in 2 sports
- Medals: Gold 0 Silver 0 Bronze 0 Total 0

World Aquatics Championships appearances
- 1994; 1998; 2001; 2003; 2005; 2007; 2009; 2011; 2013; 2015; 2017; 2019; 2022; 2023; 2024

Other related appearances
- Soviet Union (1973–1991)

Latvia competed at the 2022 World Aquatics Championships in Budapest, Hungary from 17 June to 3 July.

== Diving ==
Latvia entered one diver.

Women

| Athlete | Event | Preliminaries | | Semifinals | | Final | |
| Athlete | Event | Points | Rank | Points | Rank | Points | Rank |
|---|---|---|---|---|---|---|---|
| Džeja Patrika | 1 m springboard | 213.35 | 31 | — | | did not advance | |

== Swimming ==
Latvia entered four swimmers.

Men

| Athlete | Event | Heat | | Semifinal | | Final | |
| Athlete | Event | Time | Rank | Time | Rank | Time | Rank |
|---|---|---|---|---|---|---|---|
| Daniils Bobrovs | 100 m breaststroke | 1:02.85 | 36 | did not advance | | | |
| Daniils Bobrovs | 200 m breaststroke | 2:13.96 | 24 | did not advance | | | |
| Ģirts Feldbergs | 50 m backstroke | 25.62 | =24 | did not advance | | | |
| Ģirts Feldbergs | 100 m backstroke | 55.43 | 25 | did not advance | | | |

Women

| Athlete | Event | Heat | | Semifinal | | Final | |
| Athlete | Event | Time | Rank | Time | Rank | Time | Rank |
|---|---|---|---|---|---|---|---|
| Ieva Maļuka | 100 m freestyle | 56.46 | 28 | did not advance | | | |
| Ieva Maļuka | 200 m freestyle | 2:02.43 | 25 | did not advance | | | |
| Ieva Maļuka | 200 m medley | 2:16.94 | 25 | did not advance | | | |
| Gabriela Ņikitina | 50 m freestyle | 26.25 | =34 | did not advance | | | |
| Gabriela Ņikitina | 50 m butterfly | 27.41 | 34 | did not advance | | | |

Mixed

| Athlete | Event | Heat | | Final | |
| Athlete | Event | Time | Rank | Time | Rank |
|---|---|---|---|---|---|
| Daniils Bobrovs; Ģirts Feldbergs; Ieva Maļuka; Gabriela Ņikitina | 4×100 m freestyle relay | 3:38.23 | 17 | did not advance | |
| Daniils Bobrovs; Ģirts Feldbergs; Ieva Maļuka; Gabriela Ņikitina | 4 × 100 m medley relay | 3:57.77 | 15 | did not advance | |
