= Latvia at the 2024 World Aquatics Championships =

- Flag of Latvia
- FINA code: LAT
- National federation: Swimming Federation of Latvia
- Website: swimming.lv

in Doha, Qatar
- Competitors: 5 in 2 sports
- Medals: Gold 0 Silver 0 Bronze 0 Total 0

World Aquatics Championships appearances
- 1994; 1998; 2001; 2003; 2005; 2007; 2009; 2011; 2013; 2015; 2017; 2019; 2022; 2023; 2024

Other related appearances
- Soviet Union (1973–1991)

Latvia competed at the 2024 World Aquatics Championships in Doha, Qatar from 2 to 18 February.

== Competitors ==
The following is the list of competitors in the Championships.

Sport	Men	Women	Total
Diving	0	1	1
Swimming	3	1	4
Total	3	2	5

== Diving ==
Women

Athlete	Event	Preliminaries		Semifinals		Final	
Athlete	Event	Points	Rank	Points	Rank	Points	Rank
Džeja Patrika	10 m platform	257.30	21	Did not advance			

== Swimming ==
Latvia entered 4 swimmers.

Men

Athlete	Event	Heat		Semifinal		Final	
Athlete	Event	Time	Rank	Time	Rank	Time	Rank
Daniils Bobrovs	100 metre breaststroke	1:03.85	49	Did not advance			
Daniils Bobrovs	200 metre breaststroke	2:15.25	21	Did not advance			
Ģirts Feldbergs	50 metre backstroke	26.08	27	Did not advance			
Ģirts Feldbergs	100 metre backstroke	56.02	31	Did not advance			
Reds Rullis	100 metre freestyle	51.72	53	Did not advance			
Reds Rullis	200 metre freestyle	1:52.42	40	Did not advance			

Women

Athlete	Event	Heat		Semifinal		Final	
Athlete	Event	Time	Rank	Time	Rank	Time	Rank
Gabriela Ņikitina	50 metre freestyle	26.85	50	Did not advance			
Gabriela Ņikitina	50 metre butterfly	27.87	34	Did not advance			
