= Swimming at the 2019 World Aquatics Championships – 4 × 100 metre mixed freestyle relay =

4 × 100 metre mixed freestyle relay at the 2019 World Aquatics Championships
- Venue: Nambu University Municipal Aquatics Center
- Location: Gwangju, South Korea
- Dates: 27 July (heats and final)
- Competitors: 144 from 36 nations
- Teams: 36
- Winning time: 3:19.40

Medalists
gold medal	Caeleb Dressel; Zach Apple; Mallory Comerford; Simone Manuel; Blake Pieroni; Nathan Adrian; Katie McLaughlin; Abbey Weitzeil	United States
silver medal	Kyle Chalmers; Clyde Lewis; Emma McKeon; Bronte Campbell; Cameron McEvoy; Alexander Graham; Brianna Throssell; Madison Wilson	Australia
bronze medal	Clément Mignon; Mehdy Metella; Charlotte Bonnet; Marie Wattel; Maxime Grousset; Béryl Gastaldello	France

The 4 × 100 metre mixed freestyle relay competition at the 2019 World Championships was held on 27 July 2019. The event was won by the United States team in a world record time of 3 minutes, 19.40 seconds.

== Records ==
Prior to the competition, the existing world and championship records were as follows.

World record	United States	3:19.60	Budapest, Hungary	29 July 2017
Competition record	United States	3:19.60	Budapest, Hungary	29 July 2017

The following new records were set during this competition.

Date	Event	Nationality	Time	Record
27 July	Final	United States	3:19.40	WR

== Results ==
=== Heats ===
The heats were held on at 10:53.

Rank	Heat	Lane	Nation	Swimmers	Time	Notes
1	3	0	United States	Blake Pieroni (48.15); Nathan Adrian (47.67); Katie McLaughlin (53.96); Abbey Weitzeil (52.92)	3:22.70	Q
2	4	2	Australia	Cameron McEvoy (48.69); Alexander Graham (48.40); Brianna Throssell (53.46); Madison Wilson (53.22)	3:23.77	Q
3	3	1	Canada	Markus Thormeyer (48.98); Yuri Kisil (48.25); Kayla Sanchez (53.10); Maggie MacNeil (53.76)	3:24.09	Q
4	4	4	France	Clément Mignon (48.33); Maxime Grousset (48.61); Charlotte Bonnet (53.39); Béryl Gastaldello (53.94)	3:24.27	Q
5	3	5	Italy	Manuel Frigo (48.75); Alessandro Miressi (48.39); Ilaria Bianchi (54.80); Federica Pellegrini (53.12)	3:25.06	Q
6	4	5	Russia	Mikhail Vekovishchev (48.68); Ivan Girev (48.72); Daria S. Ustinova (53.87); Veronika Andrusenko (54.11)	3:25.38	Q
7	3	2	Japan	Katsuhiro Matsumoto (48.78); Katsumi Nakamura (48.21); Tomomi Aoki (54.52); Aya Sato (53.90)	3:25.41	Q
8	3	4	Netherlands	Kyle Stolk (49.17); Jesse Puts (48.56); Kira Toussaint (54.99); Maud van der Meer (54.57)	3:27.29	Q
9	4	3	Germany	Josha Salchow (49.50); Christoph Fildebrandt (48.60); Isabel Marie Gose (55.16); Julia Mrozinski (54.11)	3:27.37	
10	3	3	Poland	Jakub Kraska (49.24); Jan Hołub (49.37); Katarzyna Wilk (53.93); Aleksandra Polańska (55.09)	3:27.63	NR
11	2	1	Switzerland	Roman Mityukov (50.00); Antonio Djakovic (49.12); Maria Ugolkova (54.14); Noémi Girardet (55.88)	3:29.14	NR
12	4	8	Singapore	Darren Chua Yi Shou (49.97); Jonathan Tan Eu Jin (49.65); Cherlyn Yeoh (55.13); Quah Jing Wen (55.51)	3:30.26	
13	4	0	South Korea	Yang Jae-hoon (49.60); Lee Kun-a (55.83); Jeong So-eun (55.32); Park Seon-kwan (50.45)	3:31.20	NR
14	4	7	Turkey	Yalım Acımış (50.60); Hüseyin Emre Sakçı (48.92); Selen Özbilen (56.05); Viktoriya Zeynep Güneş (55.81)	3:31.38	
15	3	6	China	Yu Hexin (50.53); Cao Jiwen (48.82); Wang Jingzhuo (55.26); Wu Qingfeng (57.11)	3:31.72	
16	3	8	Hong Kong	Nicholas Lim (51.99); Ian Ho Yentou (49.53); Tam Hoi Lam (56.24); Camille Cheng (54.79)	3:32.55	NR
17	3	7	South Africa	Christopher Reid (50.81); Ryan Coetzee (50.64); Emma Chelius (55.14); Tayla Lovemore (56.30)	3:32.89	
18	1	6	Luxembourg	Julien Henx (51.30); Raphaël Stacchiotti (49.82); Julie Meynen (55.22); Monique Olivier (57.21)	3:33.55	NR
19	1	8	Philippines	Luke Gebbie (50.01); Nicole Oliva (56.64); James Deiparine (54.35); Remedy Rule (56.14)	3:37.14	NR
20	4	1	Latvia	Ģirts Feldbergs (51.91); Daniils Bobrovs (52.45); Kristina Steina (56.52); Ieva Maļuka (56.78)	3:37.66	NR
21	2	8	Chinese Taipei	Wang Yu-lian (50.71); An Ting-yao (50.72); Huang Mei-chien (57.58); Lin Pei-wun (1:02.09)	3:41.10	
22	1	5	Armenia	Artur Barseghyan (51.32); Vahan Mkhitaryan (52.66); Ani Poghosyan (59.04); Varsenik Manucharyan (1:01.05)	3:44.07	NR
23	3	9	Senegal	Steven Aimable (51.72); Abdoul Niane (51.55); Sophia Diagne (1:01.38); Jeanne Boutbien (59.56)	3:44.21	
24	2	9	Cayman Islands	Brett Fraser (50.18); Jordan Crooks (51.90); Raya Embury-Brown (1:02.72); Lauren Hew (59.74)	3:44.54	
25	4	9	Kenya	Issa Mohamed (53.44); Maria Brunlehner (58.88); Emily Muteti (1:00.64); Danilo Rosafio (53.69)	3:46.65	NR
26	1	4	Seychelles	Felicity Passon (57.06); Simon Bachmann (54.17); Aaliyah Palestrini (1:01.75); Samuele Rossi (55.00)	3:47.98	
27	1	7	Jordan	Khader Baqlah (49.09); Amro Al-Wir (55.31); Leedia Alsafadi (1:03.54); Talita Baqlah (1:00.41)	3:48.35	
28	1	2	Mongolia	Delgerkhuu Myagmar (53.68) NR; Zandanbal Gunsennorov (55.10); Enkhzul Khuyagbaatar (1:03.61); Enkhkhuslen Batbayar (58.60)	3:50.99	
29	2	4	Angola	Catarina Sousa (59.11); Daniel Francisco (53.78); Lia Ana Lima (1:03.51); Salvador Gordo (54.69)	3:51.09	
30	2	3	Papua New Guinea	Samuel Seghers (52.84); Georgia-Leigh Vele (1:02.29); Judith Meauri (1:03.66); Ryan Maskelyne (54.67)	3:53.46	
31	2	5	Uganda	Atuhaire Ambala (54.99); Selina Katumba (1:04.19); Tendo Mukalazi (56.55); Avice Meya (1:04.36)	4:00.09	NR
32	2	2	Madagascar	Tiana Rabarijaona (1:00.85); Heriniavo Rasolonjatovo (55.56); Jonathan Raharvel (1:00.17); Idealy Tendrinavalona (1:05.88)	4:02.46	
33	1	3	Micronesia	Tasi Limtiaco (54.53); Margie Winter (1:07.33); Taeyanna Adams (1:09.81); Kaleo Kihleng (56.30)	4:07.97	
34	2	0	Tonga	Finau Ohuafi (56.67); Noelani Day (1:06.50); Charissa Panuve (1:08.37); Amini Fonua (56.65)	4:08.19	NR
35	2	7	Maldives	Ali Imaan (1:01.84); Aishath Sausan (1:11.87); Sajina Aishath (1:13.12); Mubal Azzam Ibrahim (59.08)	4:25.91	NR
	4	6	Israel	Tomer Frankel (50.11); Meiron Cheruti; Anastasia Gorbenko; Andrea Murez	DSQ	
	1	1	Nigeria	Ifeakachuku Nmor; Chinelo Iyadi; Abiola Ogunbanwo; Yellow Yeiyah	DNS	
	2	6	Panama		DNS	

=== Final ===
The final was started at 21.47.

Rank	Lane	Nation	Swimmers	Time	Notes
1st place, gold medalist(s)	4	United States	Caeleb Dressel (47.34); Zach Apple (47.34); Mallory Comerford (52.72); Simone Manuel (52.00)	3:19.40	WR
2nd place, silver medalist(s)	5	Australia	Kyle Chalmers (47.37); Clyde Lewis (48.18); Emma McKeon (52.06); Bronte Campbell (52.36)	3:19.97	OC
3rd place, bronze medalist(s)	6	France	Clément Mignon (48.44); Mehdy Metella (47.78); Charlotte Bonnet (52.87); Marie Wattel (53.02)	3:22.11	
4	3	Canada	Markus Thormeyer (48.84); Yuri Kisil (48.58); Taylor Ruck (53.12); Penny Oleksiak (52.00)	3:22.54	NR
5	7	Russia	Vladislav Grinev (48.42); Vladimir Morozov (47.31); Maria Kameneva (52.95); Daria Ustinova (54.04)	3:22.72	NR
6	8	Netherlands	Kyle Stolk (48.97); Jesse Puts (47.84); Femke Heemskerk (52.81); Ranomi Kromowidjojo (53.86)	3:23.48	
7	1	Japan	Katsumi Nakamura (48.49); Katsuhiro Matsumoto (47.99); Rika Omoto (54.36); Aya Sato (53.83)	3:24.67	AS
8	2	Italy	Manuel Frigo (48.80); Alessandro Miressi (48.27); Ilaria Bianchi (54.81); Federica Pellegrini (53.70)	3:25.58	
