= Latvia at the 2011 World Aquatics Championships =

- Flag of Latvia
- FINA code: LAT
- National federation: Latvijas Peldēšanas federācija
- Website: www.swimming.lv

in Shanghai, China
- Competitors: 3 in 1 sports
- Medals Ranked -th: Gold 0 Silver 0 Bronze 0 Total 0

World Aquatics Championships appearances
- 1994; 1998; 2001; 2003; 2005; 2007; 2009; 2011; 2013; 2015; 2017; 2019; 2022; 2023; 2024

Other related appearances
- Soviet Union (1973–1991)

Latvia competed at the 2011 World Aquatics Championships in Shanghai, China between July 16 and 31, 2011.

== Swimming ==
Latvia qualified 3 swimmers.

Men

Athlete	Event	Heats		Semifinals		Final	
Athlete	Event	Time	Rank	Time	Rank	Time	Rank
Ivars Akmentiņš	Men's 50m Freestyle	23.57	42	did not advance			
Ivars Akmentiņš	Men's 100m Freestyle	51.89	52	did not advance			
Uvis Kalniņš	Men's 100m Freestyle	50.46	44	did not advance			
Uvis Kalniņš	Men's 200m Freestyle	1:52.20	36	did not advance			

Women

Athlete	Event	Heats		Semifinals		Final	
Athlete	Event	Time	Rank	Time	Rank	Time	Rank
Gabriela Ņikitina	Women's 50m Freestyle	26.20	33	did not advance			
Gabriela Ņikitina	Women's 50m Butterfly	27.92	33	did not advance			
