= 2020 Lithuanian Swimming Championships =

- Host city: Klaipėda, Lithuania
- Date(s): December 17–19
- Venue(s): Klaipėda Swimming Pool

The 2020 Lithuanian Swimming Championships was held in Klaipėda, Lithuania, from 17 December to 19 December.

== Events ==
- Freestyle: 50 m, 100 m, 200 m, 400 m
- Backstroke: 50 m, 100 m, 200 m
- Breaststroke: 50 m, 100 m, 200 m
- Butterfly: 50 m, 100 m, 200 m
- Individual medley: 200 m, 400 m
- Relay: 4×100 m free, 4×100 m medley

== Results ==
=== Men's events ===
| Event | Gold | | Silver | | Bronze | |
|---|---|---|---|---|---|---|
| 50 m freestyle | Simonas Bilis | 22.36 | Jokūbas Keblys | 22.91 | Julius Bačkulis | 23.29 |
| 100 m freestyle | Simonas Bilis | 49.16 | Danas Rapšys | 49.25 | Daniil Pancerevas | 50.22 NU17 |
| 200 m freestyle | Daniil Pancerevas | 1:49.40 NU17 | Tomas Navikoinis | 1:52.84 | Deividas Kazilas | 1:54.39 |
| 400 m freestyle | Deividas Kazilas | 4:09.81 | Nojus Skirutis | 4:11.81 | Džiugas Miškinis | 4:12.44 |
| 1500 m freestyle | Džiugas Miškinis | 16:54.48 | Igor Kazlovskij | 17:28.02 | Titas Vaitukaitis | 17:41.15 |
| 50 m backstroke | Edvinas Česnakas | 26.48 | Omar Pinzón | 26.59 | Erikas Grigaitis | 26.60 |
| 100 m backstroke | Omar Pinzón | 56.17 | Erikas Grigaitis | 56.49 | Danielis Kvederis | 58.13 |
| 200 m backstroke | Erikas Grigaitis | 2:02.57 | Omar Pinzón | 2:02.65 | Danielis Kvederis | 2:05.70 |
| 50 m breaststroke | Andrius Šidlauskas | 28.82 | Mantas Lisauskas | 29.17 | Giedrius Titenis | 29.26 |
| 100 m breaststroke | Andrius Šidlauskas | 1:00.10 | Giedrius Titenis | 1:01.07 | Aleksas Savickas | 1:04.08 |
| 200 m breaststroke | Andrius Šidlauskas | 2:10.56 | Giedrius Titenis | 2:12.26 | Mantas Lisauskas | 2:18.91 |
| 50 m butterfly | Deividas Margevičius | 23.68 | Daniil Pancerevas | 24.62 NU17 | Julius Bačkulis | 24.88 |
| 100 m butterfly | Deividas Margevičius | 53.00 | Daniil Pancerevas | 54.69 NU17 | Saverio Multin | 56.32 |
| 200 m butterfly | Deividas Margevičius | 2:01.96 | Nojus Skirutis | 2:07.85 | Saverio Multin | 2:08.72 |
| 200 m individual medley | Eimantas Milius | 2:06.14 | Omar Pinzón | 2:07.38 | Nojus Skirutis | 2:09.32 |
| 400 m individual medley | Nojus Skirutis | 4:38.77 | Džiugas Karklelis | 4:47.20 | Karolis Olišauskas | 4:49.75 |
| 4×100 m freestyle relay | Panevėžys Žemyna | 3:24.15 | Klaipėda Gintaras SC | 3:34.50 | Kaunas PM | 3:37.10 |
| 4×100 m medley relay | Kaunas PM | 3:44.70 | Panevėžys Žemyna | 3:44.71 | Kaunas PM | 3:55.99 |

=== Women's events ===
| Event | Gold | | Silver | | Bronze | |
|---|---|---|---|---|---|---|
| 50 m freestyle | Smiltė Plytnykaitė | 26.81 | Gabija Gailiušytė | 27.09 | Laura Šliburytė | 27.34 |
| 100 m freestyle | Smiltė Plytnykaitė | 57.86 | Marija Romanovskaja | 58.18 | Sylvia Statkevičius | 58.75 |
| 200 m freestyle | Sylvia Statkevičius | 2:06.82 NU15 | Marija Romanovskaja | 2:06.87 | Patricija Kondroškaitė | 2:11.13 |
| 400 m freestyle | Sylvia Statkevičius | 4:30.81 | Marija Romanovskaja | 4:34.96 | Smiltė Plytnykaitė | 4:38.64 |
| 800 m freestyle | Sylvia Statkevičius | 9:24.31 | Marija Romanovskaja | 9:32.64 | Virginija Volodkaitė | 10:01.26 |
| 50 m backstroke | Paulina Pekūnaitė | 30.55 | Patricija Geriksonaitė | 31.14 | Radvilė Keršavičiūtė | 31.53 |
| 100 m backstroke | Ugnė Mažutaitytė | 1:02.10 | Paulina Pekūnaitė | 1:04.54 | Patricija Geriksonaitė | 1:07.28 |
| 200 m backstroke | Ugnė Mažutaitytė | 2:14.97 | Paulina Pekūnaitė | 2:20.88 | Gabrielė Burokaitė | 2:28.59 |
| 50 m breaststroke | Agnė Šeleikaitė | 32.49 | Elzė Bielskutė | 34.09 | Aistė Slatkevičiūtė | 34.17 |
| 100 m breaststroke | Agnė Šeleikaitė | 1:12.12 | Smiltė Plytnykaitė | 1:12.18 | Aušrinė Bakutytė | 1:15.77 |
| 200 m breaststroke | Agnė Šeleikaitė | 2:39.45 | Aušrinė Bakutytė | 2:40.95 | Ieva Evaltaitė | 2:43.94 |
| 50 m butterfly | Erika Pasakinskaitė | 28.86 | Laura Šliburytė | 29.01 | Patricija Kondraškaitė | 29.11 |
| 100 m butterfly | Erika Pasakinskaitė | 1:03.42 | Radvilė Kerševičiūtė | 1:04.64 | Giedrė Skordenytė | 1:06.83 |
| 200 m butterfly | Erika Pasakinskaitė | 2:21.85 | Vytė Gelažytė | 2:32.71 | Austė Backevičiūtė | 2:35.68 |
| 200 m individual medley | Smiltė Plytnykaitė | 2:22.97 | Erika Pasakinskaitė | 2:27.79 | Vytė Gelažytė | 2:30.18 |
| 400 m individual medley | Marija Romanovskaja | 5:17.25 | Gabrielė Burokaitė | 5:21.71 | Smiltė Plytnykaitė | 5:25.60 |
| 4×100 m freestyle relay | Kaunas PM | 3:59.91 | Vilnius MSC | 4:00.27 NU17 | Kaunas PM | 4:10.54 |
| 4×100 m medley relay | Kaunas PM | 4:27.92 | Kaunas PM | 4:38.29 | Vilnius MSC | 4:40.44 |

=== Mixed events ===
| Event | Gold | | Silver | | Bronze | |
|---|---|---|---|---|---|---|
| 4×100 m medley relay | Kaunas PM | 4:06.45 | Vilnius MSC | 4:10.93 | Kaunas PM | 4:14.63 |

== See also ==
- List of Lithuanian records in swimming
