= 2021 Baltic States Swimming Championships =

- Host city: Klaipėda, Lithuania
- Date(s): March 6–7
- Venue(s): Klaipėda Swimming Pool
- Nations participating: 3
- Athletes participating: 207
- Events: 34

The 2021 Baltic States Swimming Championships was held in Klaipėda, Lithuania, between March 6 and March 7.

Some events were also held separately for junior boys and girls (Baltic States Youth Swimming Meet). Championships were broadcast live via Lithuanian National Radio and Television.

== Medal table ==
Host nation (Lithuania)

Rank	Nation	Gold	Silver	Bronze	Total
1	Lithuania (LTU)*	27	12	19	58
2	Latvia (LAT)	6	10	4	20
3	Estonia (EST)	1	12	12	25
Totals (3 entries)		34	34	35	103

== Events ==
- Freestyle: 50 m, 100 m, 200 m, 400 m
- Backstroke: 50 m, 100 m, 200 m
- Breaststroke: 50 m, 100 m, 200 m
- Butterfly: 50 m, 100 m, 200 m
- Individual medley: 200 m, 400 m
- Relay: 4×100 m free, 4×100 m medley

== Results ==
=== Men's events ===
Event	Gold		Silver		Bronze	
50 m freestyle	Jokūbas Keblys (LTU)	23.06	Julius Bačkulis (LTU)	23.49	Joris Veretinskas (LTU)	23.62
100 m freestyle	Simonas Bilis (LTU)	50.18	Tomas Navikonis (LTU)	50.51	Deividas Margevičius (LTU)	50.85
200 m freestyle	Tomas Navikonis (LTU)	1:51.47	Edvinas Česnakas (LTU)	1:53.34	Arturs Markovs (LAT)	1:54.52
400 m freestyle	Arturs Markovs (LAT)	4:05.80	Džiugas Miškinis (LTU)	4:05.86	Jegors Mihailovs (LAT)	4:11.55
50 m backstroke	Gytis Stankevičius (LTU)	26.08	Girts Feldbergs (LAT)	26.51	Edvinas Česnakas (LTU)	26.54
100 m backstroke	Gytis Stankevičius (LTU)	56.18	Girts Feldbergs (LAT)	56.63	Erikas Grigaitis (LTU)	56.69
200 m backstroke	Erikas Grigaitis (LTU)	2:02.33	Eimantas Milius (LTU)	2:04.87	Girts Feldbergs (LAT); Armin Evert Lelle (EST)	2:05.45
50 m breaststroke	Giedrius Titenis (LTU)	28.18	Ralf Roose (EST)	29.04	Aleksas Savickas (LTU)	29.05
100 m breaststroke	Aleksas Savickas (LTU)	1:02.29	Daniils Bobrovs (LAT)	1:03.34	Ralf Roose (EST)	1:03.42
200 m breaststroke	Andrius Šidlauskas (LTU)	2:13.95	Daniils Bobrovs (LAT)	2:15.61	Aleksas Savickas (LTU)	2:16.43
50 m butterfly	Deividas Margevičius (LTU)	24.08	Rain Rasmus Lookene (EST)	25.41	Julius Bačkulis (LTU)	25.49
100 m butterfly	Deividas Margevičius (LTU)	53.15	Armin Evert Lelle (EST)	56.11	Dmitri Astrelin (EST)	56.74
200 m butterfly	Danila Petrikins (LAT)	2:09.83	Dmitri Astrelin (EST)	2:10.89	Emilis Atkočiūnas (LTU)	2:13.80
200 m individual medley	Eimantas Milius (LTU)	2:06.30	Igor Shuvalov (EST)	2:08.40	Nojus Skirutis (LTU)	2:09.18
400 m individual medley	Nojus Skirutis (LTU)	4:35.67	Igor Shuvalov (EST)	4:41.71	Karolis Olišauskas (LTU)	4:48.49
4×100 m freestyle relay	Lithuania	3:25.51	Latvia	3:30.35	Estonia	3:32.80
4×100 m medley relay	Lithuania	3:42.07	Latvia	3:48.56	Estonia	3:51.69

=== Women's events ===
Event	Gold		Silver		Bronze	
50 m freestyle	Gabriela Ņikitina (LAT)	26.02	Gabija Gailiušytė (LTU)	26.79	Smiltė Plytntykaitė (LTU)	26.91
100 m freestyle	Gabriela Ņikitina (LAT)	57.17	Smiltė Plytntykaitė (LTU)	57.64	Patricija Kondraškaitė (LTU)	58.67
200 m freestyle	Smiltė Plytntykaitė (LTU)	2:05.21	Marija Romanovskaja (LTU)	2:07.28	Sylvia Statkevičius (LTU)	2:07.64
400 m freestyle	Sylvia Statkevičius (LTU)	4:29.67	Britt Raudsepp (EST)	4:38.22	Marija Romanovskaja (LTU)	4:43.57
50 m backstroke	Ugnė Mažutaitytė (LTU)	29.08	Elizabete Paula Ozola (LAT)	30.48	Paulina Pekūnaitė (LTU)	30.60
100 m backstroke	Ugnė Mažutaitytė (LTU)	1:01.99 NR	Elizabete Paula Ozola (LAT)	1:04.73	Paulina Pekūnaitė (LTU)	1:05.54
200 m backstroke	Ugnė Mažutaitytė (LTU)	2:12.90	Paulina Pekūnaitė (LTU)	2:21.62	Katriin Hansalu (EST)	2:22.15
50 m breaststroke	Arina Sisojeva (LAT)	33.08	Agnė Šeleikaitė (LTU)	33.09	Egle Salu (EST)	33.31
100 m breaststroke	Kotryna Teterevkova (LTU)	1:09.23	Arina Sisojeva (LAT)	1:11.42	Agnė Šeleikaitė (LTU)	1:12.32
200 m breaststroke	Kotryna Teterevkova (LTU)	2:31.48	Aušrinė Bakutytė (LTU)	2:40.42	Mirtel Merimaa (EST)	2:42.26
50 m butterfly	Gabriela Ņikitina (LAT)	27.22	Aurelia Roos (EST)	28.32	Laura-Liis Vladmaa (EST)	29.54
100 m butterfly	Erika Pasakinskaitė (LTU)	1:03.03	Radvilė Kerševičiūtė (LTU)	1:04.48	Aurelia Roos (EST)	1:04.76
200 m butterfly	Erika Pasakinskaitė (LTU)	2:21.53	Polina Timofejeva (EST)	2:30.92	Violanta Gurjanova (EST)	2:42.54
200 m individual medley	Smiltė Plytnykaitė (LTU)	2:20.86	Karolin Victoria Kotsar (EST)	2:26.91	Vytė Gelažytė (LTU)	2:27.87
400 m individual medley	Karolin Victoria Kotsar (EST)	5:13.28	Violanta Gurjanova (EST)	5:17.10	Vytė Gelažytė (LTU)	5:21.17
4×100 m freestyle relay	Lithuania	3:56.34	Latvia	4:01.05	Estonia	4:03.56
4×100 m medley relay	Lithuania	4:14.57	Estonia	4:27.23	Latvia	4:29.00
