= Latvia at the 2019 World Aquatics Championships =

- Flag of Latvia
- FINA code: LAT
- National federation: Latvijas Peldēšanas federācija
- Website: www.swimming.lv

in Gwangju, South Korea
- Medals: Gold 0 Silver 0 Bronze 0 Total 0

World Aquatics Championships appearances
- 1994; 1998; 2001; 2003; 2005; 2007; 2009; 2011; 2013; 2015; 2017; 2019; 2022; 2023; 2024

Other related appearances
- Soviet Union (1973–1991)

Latvia competed at the 2019 World Aquatics Championships in Gwangju, South Korea from 12 to 28 July.

== Swimming ==
Latvia entered six swimmers.

Men

Athlete	Event	Heat		Semifinal		Final	
Athlete	Event	Time	Rank	Time	Rank	Time	Rank
Daniils Bobrovs	100 m breaststroke	1:03.32	55	did not advance			
Daniils Bobrovs	200 m breaststroke	2:17.07	42	did not advance			
Ģirts Feldbergs	50 m backstroke	26.42	=44	did not advance			
Ģirts Feldbergs	100 m backstroke	56.34	43	did not advance			
Didzis Rudavs	50 m breaststroke	28.94	47	did not advance			

Women

Athlete	Event	Heat		Semifinal		Final	
Athlete	Event	Time	Rank	Time	Rank	Time	Rank
Ieva Maļuka	100 m freestyle	56.19	37	did not advance			
Ieva Maļuka	200 m freestyle	2:02.38	29	did not advance			
Gabriela Ņikitina	50 m freestyle	25.96	35	did not advance			
Gabriela Ņikitina	50 m butterfly	27.48	=34	did not advance			
Kristina Steina	100 m backstroke	1:01.49	29	did not advance			
Kristina Steina	200 m backstroke	2:14.00	27	did not advance			

Mixed

Athlete	Event	Heat		Final	
Athlete	Event	Time	Rank	Time	Rank
Ģirts Feldbergs; Daniils Bobrovs; Kristina Steina; Ieva Maļuka	4×100 m freestyle relay	3:37.66	20	did not advance	
