= 2010 Lithuania Swimming Championships =

2010 Lithuanian Swimming Championships
- Host city: Alytus, Lithuania
- Date(s): July 1 – July 3
- Events: 38

The 2010 Lithuanian Swimming Championships a long course (50 m) event, organized by the Lithuanian Swimming Federation, was held in Alytus, Lithuania, from July 1–3.

== Events ==
The swimming program for 2010 had 38 events (19 each for men and women). The following were contested:

- Freestyle: 50 m, 100 m, 200 m, 400 m, 800 m (only women), 1500 m (only men)
- Backstroke: 50 m, 100 m, 200 m
- Breaststroke: 50 m, 100 m, 200 m
- Butterfly: 50 m, 100 m, 200 m
- Individual medley: 200 m, 400 m
- Relay: 4×100 m free, 4×200 m free; 4×100 m medley

== Results ==
=== Men's events ===
Event	Gold		Silver		Bronze	
50 m freestyle	Paulius Viktoravičius	23.37	Mindaugas Sadauskas	23.49	Edvinas Apčinikovas; Justinas Bilis	23.89
100 m freestyle	Paulius Viktoravičius	51.79	Mindaugas Sadauskas	51.86	Tadas Duškinas	52.10
200 m freestyle	Šarūnas Jankauskas	1:57.21	Simas Žiaukas	1:57.38	Simonas Bilis	1:57.92
400 m freestyle	Simas Žiaukas	4:06.77	Povilas Strazdas	4:17.60 (U15NR)	Mindaugas Kučinskas	4:27.67
1500 m freestyle	Simas Žiaukas	17:10.02	Povilas Strazdas	17:21.43	Justas Maksimavičius	17:41.11
50 m backstroke	Matas Andriekus	27.25	Justinas Bilis	27.27	Mindaugas Sadauskas	27.52
100 m backstroke	Matas Andriekus	57.59	Justinas Bilis	58.54	Eimantas Vijaikis	59.21
200 m backstroke	Matas Andriekus	2:06.74	Eimantas Vijaikis	2:08.49	Aivaras Kubilius	2:12.69
50 m breaststroke	Giedrius Titenis	28.70	Vaidotas Blažys	29.29	Edvinas Dautartas	29.36
100 m breaststroke	Edvinas Dautartas	1:03.35	Giedrius Titenis	1:03.63	Simas Jarašûnas	1:05.40
200 m breaststroke	Giedrius Titenis	2:19.65	Igor Kozlovskij	2:21.78	Simas Jarašûnas	2:22.69
50 m butterfly	Vytautas Janušaitis	24.90	Tadas Duškinas	25.03 (U17NR)	Edvinas Apčinikovas	25.77
100 m butterfly	Vytautas Janušaitis	54.87	Paulius Viktoravičius	55.42	Tadas Duškinas	55.83 (U17NR)
200 m butterfly	Edgaras Štura	2:04.30	Artiom Ščemeliov	2:15.48	Tautvydas Cinelis	2:18.85
200 m individual medley	Vytautas Janušaitis	2:02.76	Tadas Duškinas	2:11.06	Eimantas Vijaikis	2:11.75
400 m individual medley	Danas Rapšys	4:54.51	Emilis Laužikas	5:03.22	Marius Mikalauskas	5:09.90
4 x 100 m Freestyle Relay	Kaunas	3:32.24	“Delfinas” (Šiauliai)	3:34.24	“Žemyna” (Panevėžys)	3:35.31
4 x 200 m Freestyle Relay	Kaunas	8:08.53	“Delfinas” (Šiauliai)	8:11.05	Anykščiai	8:19.07
4 x 100 m Medley Relay	Kaunas Matas Andriekus; Edvinas Dautartas; Tadas Duškinas; Giedrius Andriunaitis	3:51.12	Kaunas Eimantas Vijaikis; Vaidotas Blažys; Edvinas Apčinikovas; Šarûnas Jankauskas	3:54.75	Vilnius Ramûnas Paknys; Simas Jarašûnas; Edgaras Štura; Donatas Balandis	3:58.44

=== Women's events ===
Event	Gold		Silver		Bronze	
50 m freestyle	Gritė Apanavičiûtė	26.59	Rugilė Mileišytė	26.63	Evelina Bieleckaitė	26.64
100 m freestyle	Gritė Apanavičiûtė	58.33	Rugilė Mileišytė	58.61	Evelina Bieleckaitė	59.26
200 m freestyle	Aistė Dobrovolskaitė	2:06.41	Jūratė Ščerbinskaitė	2:06.64	Kristina Kontrimaitė	2:06.86
400 m freestyle	Kristina Kontrimaitė	4:25.84 (NR)	Jūratė Ščerbinskaitė	4:31.38	Guoda Jonelytė	4:40.12
800 m freestyle	Jūratė Ščerbinskaitė	9:40.88	Guoda Jonelytė	9:41.80	Laura Mačiulaitytė	9:59.55
50 m backstroke	Rugilė Mileišytė	30.00	Inga Šukytė	31.38	Ugnė Mažutaitytė	32.45
100 m backstroke	Inga Šukytė	2:25.30	Kristina Kontrimaitė	2:27.53	Laura Dobrovolskaitė	2:28.51
200 m backstroke	Inga Šukytė	1:07.23	Ugnė Mažutaitytė	1:09.76	Laura Dobrovolskaitė	1:10.01
50 m breaststroke	Jekaterina Kiseliova	33.10	Raminta Dvariškytė	33.66	Urtė Kazakevičiūtė	33.78
100 m breaststroke	Urtė Kazakevičiūtė	1:13.54	Raminta Dvariškytė	1:13.60	Jekaterina Kiseliova	1:14.36
200 m breaststroke	Raminta Dvariškytė	2:37.28	Urtė Kazakevičiūtė	2:37.52	Jekaterina Kiseliova	2:37.90
50 m butterfly	Gritė Apanavičiûtė	28.65	Evelina Bieleckaitė	28.85	Giedrė Grigonytė	28.97
100 m butterfly	Aistė Dobrovolskaitė	1:02.29 (NR)	Giedrė Grigonytė	1:04.47	Viltautė Paplauskaitė	1:09.26
200 m butterfly	Aistė Dobrovolskaitė	2:23.81	Viltautė Paplauskaitė	2:39.46	Dovilė Slapšytė	2:40.13
200 m individual medley	Laura Dobrovolskaitė	2:32.23	Evelina Rudytė	2:37.67	Ingrida Jurkutė	2:38.35
400 m individual medley	Laura Dobrovolskaitė	5:20.02	Evelina Rudytė	5:34.86	Viktė Labanauskaitė	5:37.47
4 x 100 m Freestyle Relay	Kaunas	4:06.15	Anykščiai	4:09.60	“Delfinas” (Šiauliai)	4:17.07
4 x 200 m Freestyle Relay	Anykščiai	9:21.63	Kaunas	9:21.87	“Žemyna” (Panevėžys)	9:27.34
4 x 100 m Medley Relay	Kaunas Ugnė Mažutaitytė; Urtė Kazakevičiūtė; Aistė Dobrovolskaitëė; Evelina Bieleckaitė	4:27.97	“Delfinas” (Šiauliai) Eva Gliožerytė; Ingrida Jurkutė; Agnė Šileikytė; Simona Raudonytė	4:45.53	KC SM Sandra Paschalskytė; Erika Bespalko; Viltautė Paplauskaitė; Dovilė Slapšytė	4:45.93
