= Swimming at the 2022 European Aquatics Championships – Women's 200 metre breaststroke =

European Championship

Women's 200 metre breaststroke at the 2022 European Aquatics Championships
- Venue: Foro Italico
- Dates: 14 August (heats and semifinals); 15 August (final)
- Competitors: 32 from 22 nations
- Winning time: 2:23.27

Medalists
gold medal	Lisa Mamié	Switzerland
silver medal	Martina Carraro	Italy
bronze medal	Kotryna Teterevkova	Lithuania

The Women's 200 metre breaststroke competition of the 2022 European Aquatics Championships was held on 14 and 15 August 2022.

== Records ==
Prior to the competition, the existing world, European and championship records were as follows.

	Name	Nationality	Time	Location	Date
World record	Tatjana Schoenmaker	South Africa	2:18.95	Tokyo	30 July 2021
European record	Rikke Møller Pedersen	Denmark	2:19.11	Barcelona	1 August 2013
Championship record	Rikke Møller Pedersen	Denmark	2:19.84	Berlin	22 August 2014

== Results ==
=== Heats ===
The heats were started on 14 August at 09:45.

Rank	Heat	Lane	Name	Nationality	Time	Notes
1	4	4	Lisa Mamié	Switzerland	2:24.12	Q
2	2	4	Francesca Fangio	Italy	2:24.76	Q
3	2	5	Martina Carraro	Italy	2:26.02	Q
4	4	2	Thea Blomsterberg	Denmark	2:26.22	Q
5	3	4	Kotryna Teterevkova	Lithuania	2:26.56	Q
6	4	3	Kristýna Horská	Czech Republic	2:26.81	Q
7	3	3	Mona McSharry	Ireland	2:26.94	Q
8	2	6	Tes Schouten	Netherlands	2:27.11	Q
9	4	6	Bente Fischer	Germany	2:27.89	Q
10	3	6	Clara Rybak-Andersen	Denmark	2:28.02	Q
11	4	1	Kara Hanlon	Great Britain	2:28.35	Q
12	3	5	Sophie Hansson	Sweden	2:28.47	Q, WD
13	4	5	Jessica Vall	Spain	2:28.83	Q
14	2	7	Nikoleta Trníková	Slovakia	2:28.84	Q
15	3	2	Arianna Castiglioni	Italy	2:28.95	
16	3	1	Ana Blažević	Croatia	2:28.96	Q
17	4	9	Klara Thormalm	Sweden	2:29.15	Q
18	2	3	Lisa Angiolini	Italy	2:29.21	
19	2	8	Laura Lahtinen	Finland	2:29.81	Q
20	2	2	Defne Coşkun	Turkey	2:30.21	
21	4	7	Niamh Coyne	Ireland	2:30.67	
22	3	7	Adèle Blanchetière	France	2:30.68	
23	3	8	Julia Månsson	Sweden	2:31.37	
24	2	1	Andrea Podmaníková	Slovakia	2:32.15	
25	3	9	Ellie McCartney	Ireland	2:32.38	
26	2	0	Maria Romanjuk	Estonia	2:32.41	
27	4	0	Martta Ruuska	Finland	2:33.48	
28	3	0	Kamila Isayeva	Ukraine	2:33.56	
29	4	8	Eleni Kontogeorgou	Greece	2:33.84	
30	1	5	Lena Kreundl	Austria	2:36.26	
31	1	4	Nàdia Tudó	Andorra	2:36.73	
	1	3	Amy Micallef	Malta	Disqualified	

=== Semifinals ===
The semifinals were started on 14 August at 18:37.

Rank	Heat	Lane	Name	Nationality	Time	Notes
1	2	5	Martina Carraro	Italy	2:23.73	Q
2	2	4	Lisa Mamié	Switzerland	2:24.04	Q
3	2	3	Kotryna Teterevkova	Lithuania	2:25.01	q
4	2	6	Mona McSharry	Ireland	2:25.24	q
5	1	5	Thea Blomsterberg	Denmark	2:25.44	Q
6	1	4	Francesca Fangio	Italy	2:25.55	Q
7	1	3	Kristýna Horská	Czech Republic	2:25.71	q
8	1	7	Jessica Vall	Spain	2:26.64	q
9	1	6	Tes Schouten	Netherlands	2:26.68	
10	2	7	Kara Hanlon	Great Britain	2:26.78	
11	2	2	Bente Fischer	Germany	2:27.28	
12	1	1	Ana Blažević	Croatia	2:27.29	NR
13	1	8	Laura Lahtinen	Finland	2:27.60	
14	1	2	Clara Rybak-Andersen	Denmark	2:28.10	
15	2	8	Klara Thormalm	Sweden	2:28.22	
16	2	1	Nikoleta Trníková	Slovakia	2:28.40	

=== Final ===
The final was held on 15 August at 18:13.

Rank	Lane	Name	Nationality	Time	Notes
1st place, gold medalist(s)	5	Lisa Mamié	Switzerland	2:23.27	
2nd place, silver medalist(s)	4	Martina Carraro	Italy	2:23.64	
3rd place, bronze medalist(s)	3	Kotryna Teterevkova	Lithuania	2:24.16	
4	2	Thea Blomsterberg	Denmark	2:25.57	
5	1	Kristýna Horská	Czech Republic	2:26.07	
6	7	Francesca Fangio	Italy	2:26.79	
7	6	Mona McSharry	Ireland	2:26.96	
8	8	Jessica Vall	Spain	2:27.19	
