= 2010 in swimming =

2010 in swimming documents the highlights of competitive international swimming during 2010.

== Major events ==
=== World ===
- 15–19 August: Swimming at the 2010 Summer Youth Olympics in Singapore
- 18–22 August: 2010 Pan Pacific Swimming Championships, Irvine, California, USA
- 4–13 October: Swimming at the 2010 Commonwealth Games in Delhi, India
- 15–19 December: FINA World Swimming Championships (25 m) in Dubai, United Arab Emirates

=== Regional ===
- 29 January–8 February: Swimming at the 2010 South Asian Games in Dhaka, Bangladesh
- 18–23 July: Swimming at the 2010 Central American and Caribbean Games, Mayaguez, Puerto Rico
- 4–16 August: 2010 European Aquatics Championships in Budapest, Hungary
- 13–29 September: 2010 African Swimming Championships
- 12–27 November: Swimming at the 2010 Asian Games in Guangzhou, China
- 25–28 November: 2010 European Short Course Swimming Championships in Eindhoven, Netherlands

== Other events ==
=== National championships ===
Long course

Dates	Event	City
16–21 March	(Australia) Australian Championships	Sydney
18–21 March	(Iceland) Icelandic Championships	Reykjavík
29 March–3 April	(United Kingdom) British Championships	Sheffield
5–9 April	New Zealand Championships	Auckland
13–18 April	(France) French Championships	Saint-Raphaël
22–25 April	(Spain) Spanish Championships	Málaga
14–16 May	(Belgium) Belgian Championships	TBC
21–23 May	(Greece) Greek Championships	Athens
3–6 June	(Poland) Polish Championships	Gliwice
11–13 June	(Netherlands) Dutch Championships	Eindhoven
11–13 June	(Serbia) Serbian Championships	TBC
19–20 June	Luxembourg Championships	Luxembourg
1–3 July	(Lithuania) Lithuanian Championships	Alytus
14–18 July	(Sweden) Swedish Championships	Malmö
21–25 July	(Israel) Israeli Championships	Netanya
29 July–1 August	(Portugal) Portuguese Championships	Aveiro

Short course

Dates	Event	City
14–18 July	(Australia) Australian SC Championships	Brisbane
12–14 November	New Zealand SC Championships	Mount Maunganui
18–21 November	(Iceland) Icelandic SC Championships	Reykjavík
2–5 December	(Sweden) Swedish SC Championships	Stockholm
16–18 December	(Lithuania) Lithuanian SC Championships	Anykščiai
19–19 December	(Netherlands) Dutch SC Championships	TBC

=== Other major meets ===
- Mare Nostrum 2010:
  - 5–6 June: Meeting International de Natation de Monte-Carlo in Monte Carlo, Monaco
  - 9–10 June: Trofeo Ciudad de Barcelona in Barcelona, Spain
  - 12–13 June: Meeting Arena de Canet en Roussillon in Canet, France

=== Paralympic swimming ===
- 15–21 August: 2010 IPC Swimming World Championships in Eindhoven, Netherlands
- 12–19 December: 2010 Asian Para Games in Guangzhou, China
