= Lithuanian Swimming Championships =

The Lithuanian Swimming Championships is the national swimming championships for Lithuania. They are organised by LTU Aquatics and separate championships are held annually in both long course (50m) and short course (25m) pools. The two meets are the country's top domestic meet for their respective course.

The first edition of the championships was held in Raudondvaris on 5 July 1931, with events at the Nevėžis River.

== Editions ==
Year	Dates	Edition	City	Ref.
1931	5 July	1	Raudondvaris	
1935	11–14 August	2	Kaunas	
1936	23 August	3	Kaunas	
1937	7–8 August	4	Kaunas	
1938	6–7 August	5	Kaunas	
1939	30–31 July	6	Kaunas	
1940	10–11 August	7	Kaunas	
1942	30–31 August	8	Kaunas	
1943	14–15 August	9	Kaunas	
1946	2–4 August	10	Klaipėda	
1947	2–3 August	11	Klaipėda	
1948	27–29 August	12	Trakai	
1949	28–31 September	13	Zarasai	
1950	28–31 July	14	Zarasai	
1951	13–17 August	15	Zarasai	
1952	22–24 August	16	Zarasai	
1953	16–18 June	17	Trakai	
1954	1–3 August	18	Kaunas	
1955	30–31 July	19	Zarasai	
1956^{[a]}	8–11 July	20	Kaunas	
1957	28–31 July	21	Kaišiadorys	
1958	8–11 July	22	Vilnius	
1959^{[a]}	8–11 July	23	Vilnius	
1960	18–20 November	24	Vilnius	
1961	5–6 August	25	Vilnius	
1962	25–2? August	26	Zarasai	
1963^{[a]}	6–8 July	27	Vilnius	
1964	12–16 August	28	Zarasai	
1965	29 June – 1 July	29	Vilnius	
1966	27–29 July	30	Zarasai	
1967^{[a]}	26–30 June	31	Vilnius	
1968	11–13 July	32	Vilnius	
1969	21–23 June	33	Vilnius	
1970	4–6 July	34	Vilnius	
1971^{[a]}	2–4 July	35	Vilnius	
1972	1–4 July	36	Vilnius	
1973	6–8 July	37	Vilnius	
1974^{[a]}	22–24 June	38	Kaunas	
1975	4–6 July	39	Vilnius	
1976	16–18 July	40	Vilnius	
1977	28–29 May	41	Kaunas	
1978^{[a]}	23–26 July	42	Vilnius	
1979	22–24 June	43	Kaunas	
1980	30 June – 2 July	44	Vilnius	
1981	26–28 June	45	Vilnius	
1982	25–27 June	46	Vilnius	
1983	17–19 June	47	Vilnius	
1984	17–20 May	48	Vilnius	
1985	12–14 July	49	Vilnius	
1986^{[a]}	19–21 May	50	Vilnius	
1987	4–7 July	51	Vilnius	
1988	4–7 August	52	Vilnius	
1989	5–7 August	53	Vilnius	
1991^{[b]}	31 July – 3 August	54	Vilnius	
1992	2–4 July	55	Kaunas	
1993	18–20 June	56	Vilnius	
1994	24–26 June	57	Vilnius	
1995^{[b]}	1–2 August	58	Vilnius	
1996	5–7 July	59	Vilnius	
1997	28–29 June	60	Vilnius	
1998	19–21 June	61	Vilnius	
1999	3–6 July	62	Vilnius	
2000	22–23 June	63	Vilnius	
2001	28–30 June	64	Vilnius	
2002^{[c]}	27–29 June	65	Vilnius	
2003	26–28 June	66	Vilnius	
2004	23–25 July	67	Vilnius	
2005	29 June – 1 July	68	Vilnius	
2006	13–15 July	69	Vilnius	
2007	11–13 July	70	Vilnius	
2008	12–14 June	71	Vilnius	
2009	26–28 June	72	Alytus	
2010	1–3 July	73	Alytus	
2011	28–30 June	74	Alytus	
2012	28–30 June	75	Alytus	
2013	27–29 June	76	Alytus	
2014	26–28 June	77	Kaunas	
2015	9–11 July	78	Kaunas	
2016	26–28 May	79	Kaunas	
2017	3–5 July	80	Alytus	
2018	12–14 April	81	Alytus	
2019	25–27 April	82	Kaunas	
2020	~~19–21 April~~ Cancelled	83	Kaunas	
2020	17–19 December	83	Klaipėda	
2021	27–29 May	84	Klaipėda	
2022	19–22 April	85	Klaipėda	
2023	12–15 April	86	Kaunas	
2024	3–6 April	87	Kaunas	
2025	3–6 April	88	Vilnius	
2026	23–26 April	89	Vilnius	

^{a} As the swimming program of the Lithuanian Spartakiad
^{b} As the swimming program of the World Lithuanian Sports Games
^{c} As the swimming program of the National Olympic Games of Lithuania

=== Short course ===
Year	Dates	City	Ref.
2006	2–4 February	Anykščiai	
2009	18–19 December	Anykščiai	
2010	16–18 December	Anykščiai	
2011	15–17 December	Anykščiai	
2012	20–22 December	Anykščiai	
2013	19–21 December	Anykščiai	
2014	18–20 December	Anykščiai	
2015	17–19 December	Anykščiai	
2016	15–17 December	Anykščiai	
2017	20–22 December	Anykščiai	
2018	9–11 July	Anykščiai	
2019	19–21 December	Anykščiai	
2020	~~17–19 December~~ Cancelled	—N/a	
2021	16–18 December	Klaipėda	
2022	15–17 December	Druskininkai	
2023	14–16 December	Druskininkai	
2024	13–15 December	Vilnius	
2025	19–21 December	Vilnius	

== Disciplines ==
Except as noted below, there are male and female categories for each event.

=== Long course ===
Distance	Free	Back	Breast	Fly	I.M.	Free relay	Medley relay	Mixed medley relay
50 m	●	●	●	●				
100 m	●	●	●	●				
200 m	●	●	●	●	●			
400 m	●				●	●	●	●
800 m	●					●		
1500 m	●							

=== Short course ===
Distance	Free	Back	Breast	Fly	I.M.	Free relay	Medley relay	Mixed medley relay
50 m	●	●	●	●				
100 m	●	●	●	●	●			
200 m	●	●	●	●	●			
400 m	●				●	●	●	●
800 m	●					●		
1500 m	●							

== Championships records ==
=== Long course (50m) ===
==== Men ====
Event	Time		Name	Club	Date	Location	Ref
50 m backstroke	24.54		Mantas Kaušpėdas	Klaipėdos Gintaro SC	24 April 2026	Vilnius, Lithuania	
50 m breaststroke	27.15	h, =	Andrius Šidlauskas	Šiaulių Delfinas	26 April 2026	Vilnius, Lithuania	
50 m breaststroke	27.15	=	Andrius Šidlauskas	Šiaulių Delfinas	26 April 2026	Vilnius, Lithuania	
50 m butterfly	23.58	h	Tadas Duškinas	Kauno PM	25 April 2019	Kaunas, Lithuania	

Legend: # – Record awaiting ratification by LPF; WR – World record; ER – European record;
Records not set in finals: h – heat; sf – semifinal; r – relay 1st leg; rh – relay heat 1st leg; b – B final; † – en route to final mark; tt – time trial

==== Women ====
Event	Time	Name	Club	Date	Location	Ref
100 m freestyle	54.74	Smiltė Plytnykaitė	Sostinės SC	15 April 2023	Kaunas, Lithuania	
200 m freestyle	1:58.62	Ieva Jurkūnaitė	Kauno PM	23 April 2026	Vilnius, Lithuania	
400 m freestyle	4:15.53	Ieva Jurkūnaitė	Kauno PM	24 April 2026	Vilnius, Lithuania	
100 m backstroke	1:01.41	Emilija Pociūtė	Šiaulių Delfinas	23 April 2026	Vilnius, Lithuania	
400 m individual medley	4:55.78	Guoda Tručinskaitė	Šiaulių Delfinas	4 April 2025	Vilnius, Lithuania	

Legend: # – Record awaiting ratification by LPF; WR – World record; ER – European record;
Records not set in finals: h – heat; sf – semifinal; r – relay 1st leg; rh – relay heat 1st leg; b – B final; † – en route to final mark; tt – time trial

== Lithuanian records ==
See List of Lithuanian records in swimming
