= Edvinas Dautartas =

Lithuanian swimmer (born 1987)

Personal information
- Full name: Edvinas Dautartas
- Nationality: Lithuania
- Born: 28 August 1987 (age 38) Raudondvaris, Lithuanian SSR, Soviet Union
- Height: 1.94 m (6 ft 4 1/2 in)
- Weight: 89 kg (196 lb)

Sport
- Sport: Swimming
- Strokes: Breaststroke
Medal record
Lithuania Championships
Gold medal – first place	2010 Alytus	100 m breaststroke
Gold medal – first place	2010 Alytus	4x 00 m medley
Bronze medal – third place	2010 Alytus	50 m breaststroke

Edvinas Dautartas (born 28 August 1987 in Raudondvaris) is a swimmer from Lithuania. He participated in the 2004, and 2008 Summer Olympics. National records holder.

Dautartas represented Lithuania in 2010 European Short Course Swimming Championships, where he reached final in 200 m breaststroke.
