= Kotryna Teterevkova =

Lithuanian swimmer (born 2002)

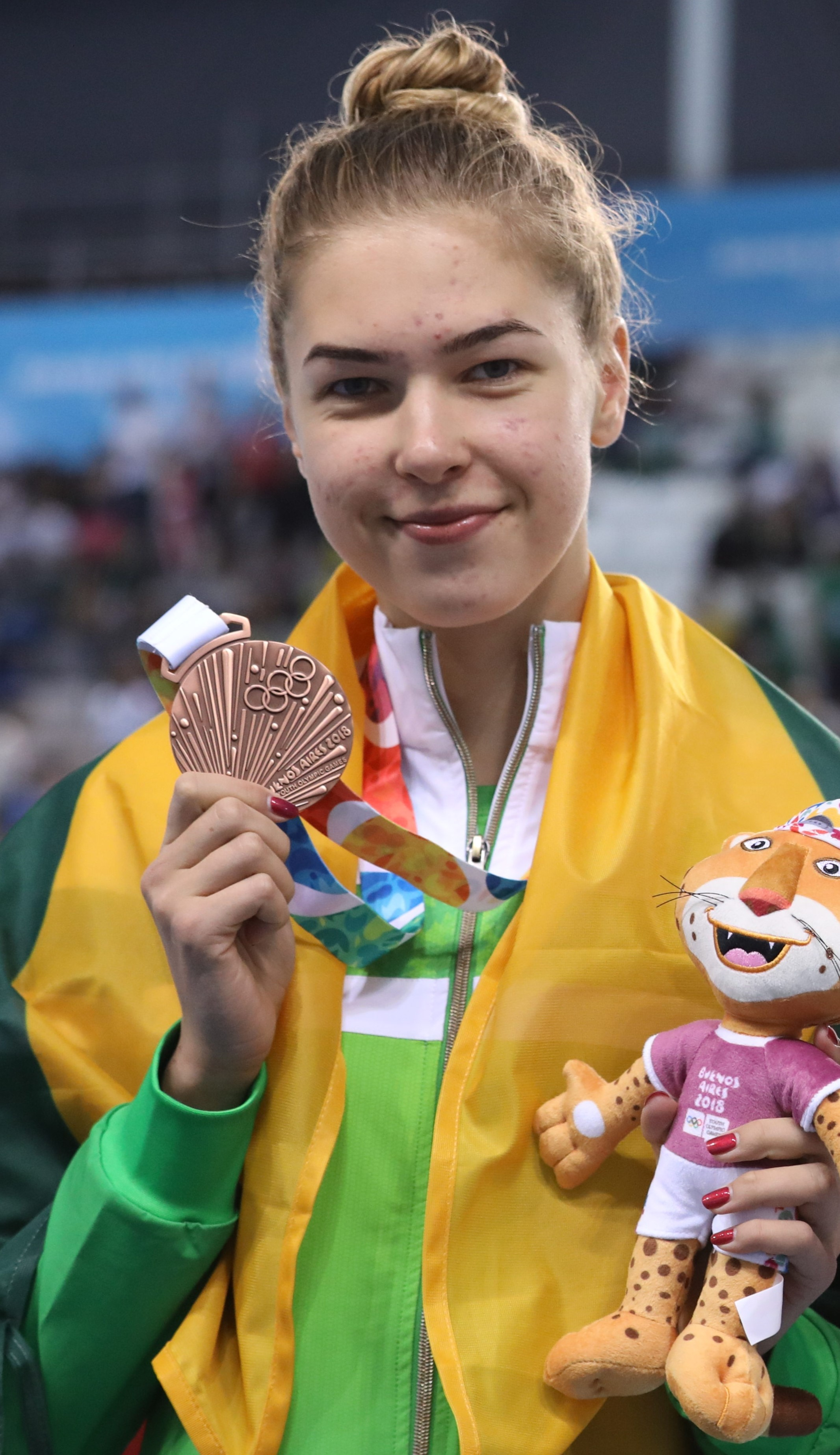
- Kotryna Teterevkova at the 2018 Summer Youth Olympics

Personal information
- National team: Lithuania
- Born: 23 January 2002 (age 24) Vilnius, Lithuania
- Height: 171 cm (5 ft 7 in)

Sport
- Sport: Swimming
- Strokes: Breaststroke
Medal record
Women's swimming
Representing Lithuania
Event	1st	2nd	3rd
European Championships (LC)	0	0	1
European Championships (SC)	0	0	1
World University Games	3	0	0
Youth Olympic Games	0	1	1
European Junior Championships	1	1	1
Total	4	2	4
European Championships
Bronze medal – third place	2022 Rome	200 m breaststroke
European Championships (SC)
Bronze medal – third place	2025 Lublin	200 m breaststroke
World University Games
Gold medal – first place	2021 Chengdu	50 m breaststroke
Gold medal – first place	2021 Chengdu	100 m breaststroke
Gold medal – first place	2021 Chengdu	200 m breaststroke
Youth Olympic Games
Silver medal – second place	2018 Buenos Aires	200 m breaststroke
Bronze medal – third place	2018 Buenos Aires	100 m breaststroke
European U-23 Championships
Silver medal – second place	2025 Šamorín	100 m breaststroke
Bronze medal – third place	2025 Šamorín	50 m breaststroke
Bronze medal – third place	2025 Šamorín	200 m breaststroke
European Junior Championships
Gold medal – first place	2018 Helsinki	100 m breaststroke
Silver medal – second place	2019 Kazan	50 m breaststroke
Bronze medal – third place	2018 Helsinki	200 m breaststroke
Baltic States Championships
Gold medal – first place	2023 Riga	100 m breaststroke
Gold medal – first place	2023 Riga	200 m breaststroke
Gold medal – first place	2023 Riga	4×100 m medley
Gold medal – first place	2021 Klaipėda	100 m breaststroke
Gold medal – first place	2021 Klaipėda	200 m breaststroke
Gold medal – first place	2021 Klaipėda	4×100 m medley

Kotryna Teterevkova (born 23 January 2002) is a Lithuanian swimmer. She is the current national record holder in the 200-meter breastroke (long and short course) and 400-meter individual medley (long and short course).

Teterevkova is also a member of Sostinės sporto centras, and is coached and trained by Michailas Romanovskis. She competed in the women's 100 metre breaststroke at the 2019 World Aquatics Championships held in Gwangju, South Korea. She represents LA Current in the International Swimming League.

== Career ==
=== 2020 Summer Olympics ===
At the 2020 Summer Olympics in Tokyo, Teterevkova competed in two events: 100 metre breaststroke and 200 metre breaststroke. In 100 metre breaststroke heats, Teterevkova placed fifteenth and set a new personal record of 1:06.82 seconds. In the 100 metre breaststroke semi-finals, she placed fourteenth, with a time of 1:07.39 seconds. In 200 metre breaststroke heats, Teterevkova placed 23rd, with a time of 2:26.82 seconds and did not qualify to the semi-finals.

=== 2021 European Short Course Swimming Championships ===
At the 2021 European Short Course Swimming Championships in Kazan, Russia, Teterevkova competed in three events: 50 metre breaststroke, 100 metre breaststroke and 200 metre breaststroke.

=== 2022 European Aquatics Championships ===
At the 2022 European Aquatics Championships in Rome, Italy, Teterevkova competed in 200 metre breaststroke final, where she won the bronze medal with a time of 2:24.16.

== International championships (50 m) ==
Meet	50 breast	100 breast	200 breast	4×100 medley^{[a]}
EC 2018	22nd	28th	22nd	11th
WC 2019	20th	22nd	22nd	18th
EC 2020	21st	14th	11th	24th
OG 2020	—N/a	14th	23rd	
WC 2022	22nd	12th	5th	29th^{[b]}
EC 2022	9th	4th	3rd place, bronze medalist(s)	
WC 2023	19th	17th	6th	
WC 2024	DNS	4th	6th (sf, WD)	
OG 2024	—N/a	16th	5th	

^{a} Mixed 4 × 100 metre medley relay
^{b} Team Lithuania was disqualified in the heats
