= Dana Kolidzeja =

Latvian swimmer (born 1999)

Personal information
- Born: 28 April 1999 (age 27)

Sport
- Sport: Swimming

Dana Kolidzeja (born 28 April 1999) is a Latvian swimmer. She competed in the women's 50 metre breaststroke event at the 2017 World Aquatics Championships. In 2014, she represented Latvia at the 2014 Summer Youth Olympics held in Nanjing, China.
