= Kristina Steina =

Latvian swimmer (born 1995)

Personal information
- Born: 28 November 1995 (age 30)

Sport
- Sport: Swimming

Kristina Steina (born 28 November 1995) is a Latvian swimmer.

She represented Latvia at the 2017 World Aquatics Championships held in Budapest, Hungary. In 2019, she represented Latvia at the 2019 World Aquatics Championships held in Gwangju, South Korea. She competed in the women's 100 metre backstroke and women's 200 metre backstroke events. In both events she did not advance to compete in the semi-finals. She also competed in the 4 × 100 metre mixed freestyle relay event.
