= Aļona Ribakova =

Latvian swimmer (born 1991)

Personal information
- National team: Latvia
- Born: 7 February 1991 (age 35) Riga, Latvia
- Height: 1.76 m (5 ft 9 in)
- Weight: 63 kg (139 lb)

Sport
- Sport: Swimming
- Strokes: Breaststroke
- Club: SK Delfīns
- College team: Riga Technical University
- Coach: Germans Jakubovskis
Medal record
Women's swimming
Representing Latvia
Baltic States Championships
Gold medal – first place	2011 Riga	200 m medley
Silver medal – second place	2011 Riga	200 m breaststroke
Bronze medal – third place	2011 Riga	100 m breaststroke

Aļona Ribakova (born 7 February 1991) is a Latvian breaststroke swimmer. She represented her country at the 2016 Summer Olympics.
