= Ieva Maļuka =

Latvian swimmer (born 2003)

Personal information
- Nationality: Latvian
- Born: 9 April 2003 (age 23)

Sport
- Sport: Swimming
- College team: NC State (2024–present); Arizona State (2022–2024)

Ieva Maļuka (born 9 April 2003) is a Latvian swimmer. She represented Latvia at the 2019 World Aquatics Championships held in Gwangju, South Korea. She competed in the women's 100 metre freestyle and women's 200 metre freestyle events. In both events she did not advance to compete in the semi-finals. She also competed in the 4 × 100 metre mixed freestyle relay event.

Her mother Jeļena Rubļevska is a former modern pentathlete who won a silver medal at the 2004 Summer Olympics.
