= Nikolajs Maskaļenko =

Latvian swimmer (born 1993)

Personal information
- Born: 11 February 1993 (age 33)

Sport
- Sport: Swimming

Nikolajs Maskaļenko (born 11 February 1993) is a Latvian swimmer. He competed in the men's 50 metre breaststroke event at the 2017 World Aquatics Championships.
