= Uvis Kalniņš =

Latvian swimmer (born 1993)

Personal information
- Nationality: Latvia
- Born: 24 October 1993 (age 32) Valmiera, Latvia
- Height: 1.91 m (6 ft 3 in)
- Weight: 82 kg (181 lb)

Sport
- Sport: Swimming
- Strokes: Freestyle, Individual Medley
- Club: Valmieras SS
- College team: Missouri State Bears (USA)
- Coach: David Collins
Medal record
Men's swimming
Representing Latvia
European Junior Championships
Bronze medal – third place	2011 Belgrade	100 m freestyle

Uvis Kalniņš (born October 24, 1993, in Valmiera) is a former Latvian swimmer, who specialized in sprint freestyle events. He won a bronze medal in the men's 100 m freestyle at the 2011 European Junior Swimming Championships in Belgrade, Serbia, with a time of 50.18 seconds. Kalniņš is also a member of the swimming team for the Missouri State Bears, and an undergraduate student at Missouri State University in Springfield, Missouri.

Kalniņš qualified for the men's 100 m freestyle, as a member of the Latvian swimming team, at the 2012 Summer Olympics in London, by eclipsing a FINA B-standard time of 50.18 seconds from the European Junior Championships. He challenged seven other swimmers on the fourth heat, including British-born Paraguayan swimmer Benjamin Hockin. Kalniņš raced to second place, and dipped under a 50-second barrier by a quarter of a second (0.25) behind Turkey's Kemal Arda Gürdal, in his personal best of 49.96. Kalniņš failed to advance into the semifinals, as he placed thirtieth overall in the preliminaries.

At the 2013 World Aquatics Championships in Barcelona, Kalniņš competed in the 100 and 200 m freestyle but failed to advance past the heats, finishing with times of 50.51 and 1:51.91 respectively.

== Career best times ==
=== Long course (50-meter pool) ===
Event	Time	Venue	Date
50 m freestyle	22.91 (NR)	Riga	May 30, 2014
100 m freestyle	49.96	London	July 31, 2012
200 m freestyle	1:51.03	Belgrade	July 10, 2011
400 m freestyle	4:01.37	Riga	May 30, 2014
800 m freestyle	8:13.73	Liepaja	July 7, 2012
1500 m freestyle	16:22.59 (NR)	Riga	June 1, 2014
50 m backstroke	28.98	Riga	June 22, 2012
100 m backstroke	57.61	Riga	June 29, 2012
50 m breaststroke	29.77	Riga	June 29, 2016
100 m breaststroke	1:02.78	Federal Way	December 4, 2015
200 m breaststroke	2:20.73	Moscow	August 11, 2015
50 m butterfly	25.83	Riga	June 28, 2016
200 m IM	2:00.39 (NR)	Kazan	Aug 5, 2015
400 m IM	4:22.60 (NR)	Gwangju	July 10, 2015
