= Smiltė Plytnykaitė =

Lithuanian swimmer

Personal information
- Nationality: Lithuania
- Born: 8 January 2007 (age 19) Nemenčinė, Lithuania
- Height: 1.78 m (5 ft 10 in)

Sport
- Sport: Swimming
- Strokes: Freestyle, breaststroke, butterfly
- Club: Sostinės sporto centras Virginia Cavaliers
Medal record
Women's swimming
Representing Lithuania
World Junior Championships
Gold medal – first place	2025 Otopeni	100 m breaststroke
Silver medal – second place	2025 Otopeni	50 m breaststroke
European Junior Championships
Gold medal – first place	2023 Belgrade	100 m freestyle
Gold medal – first place	2024 Vilnius	50 m breaststroke
Gold medal – first place	2025 Šamorín	50 m breaststroke
Gold medal – first place	2025 Šamorín	100 m breaststroke
Silver medal – second place	2024 Vilnius	100 m breaststroke
Bronze medal – third place	2024 Vilnius	4×100 m mixed medley
Bronze medal – third place	2025 Šamorín	4×100 m medley
European Youth Olympic Festival
Gold medal – first place	2022 Banská Bystrica	100 m freestyle
Gold medal – first place	2022 Banská Bystrica	4×100 m freestyle
Silver medal – second place	2022 Banská Bystrica	4×100 m mixed freestyle
Bronze medal – third place	2022 Banská Bystrica	50 m freestyle

Smiltė Plytnykaitė (born 8 January 2007) is a Lithuanian swimmer. She is a World Junior champion, a multiple European Junior champion, and a national record holder.

== Biography ==
Plytnykaitė was born in Nemenčinė to Sandra Plytnykienė and Justinas Plytnykas; she has a younger brother, Joringis. She attended and graduated from Vilnius Antakalnis Gymnasium.

In Lithuania, she formerly trained at the Sostinės sporto centras in Vilnius under coach Kęstutis Steponavičius. She rose to prominence in the Lithuanian swimming community in 2019, when at the age of 12, she broke two girls' under-13 national records previously held by Rūta Meilutytė. In the fall of 2026, she moved to the United States to study and compete for the Virginia Cavaliers at the University of Virginia.

== Career ==
=== 2022 ===
Plytnykaitė had a breakthrough performance at the 2022 European Youth Summer Olympic Festival in Banská Bystrica, Slovakia. She won four medals in total: gold in the girls' 100-metre freestyle and the girls' 4×100-metre freestyle relay, silver in the mixed 4×100-metre freestyle relay, and bronze in the girls' 50-metre freestyle.

=== 2023 ===
At the European Junior Swimming Championships in Belgrade, Serbia, she won the gold medal in the girls' 100-metre freestyle. The same year, she set the Lithuanian senior national record in the 100-metre freestyle with a time of 54.74 seconds.

=== 2024 ===
During the European Junior Championships held in Vilnius, Plytnykaitė claimed gold in the 50-metre breaststroke and silver in the 100-metre breaststroke. She also won a bronze medal as part of the Lithuanian mixed 4×100-metre medley relay team.

=== 2025 ===
At the European Junior Championships in Šamorín, Slovakia, she secured two more gold medals, becoming the champion in both the 50-metre and 100-metre breaststroke events. She added a bronze medal in the girls' 4×100-metre medley relay.

The same year, at the World Junior Swimming Championships held in Romania, Plytnykaitė claimed the World Junior Champion title in the 100-metre breaststroke and won a silver medal in the 50-metre breaststroke.
