= Gabriela Ņikitina =

Latvian swimmer (born 1994)

Personal information
- Full name: Gabriela Ņikitina
- National team: Latvia
- Born: 2 June 1994 (age 32) Riga, Latvia

Sport
- Sport: Swimming
- Strokes: Butterfly, freestyle
- Club: BJSS "Rīdzene" OSC
- Coach: Vitalijs Solovjovs
Medal record
Women's swimming
Representing Latvia
Baltic States Championships
Gold medal – first place	2017 Riga	50 m freestyle
Gold medal – first place	2017 Riga	50 m butterfly
Gold medal – first place	2017 Riga	100 m butterfly
Gold medal – first place	2021 Klaipėda	50 m freestyle
Gold medal – first place	2021 Klaipėda	100 m freestyle
Gold medal – first place	2021 Klaipėda	50 m butterfly
Silver medal – second place	2017 Riga	100 m freestyle

Gabriela Ņikitina (born 2 June 1994) is a swimmer from Latvia. She has qualified for 2012 Summer Olympics and has participated at 2011 FINA World Championships at Shanghai, China. Ņikitina was born in Riga, Latvia.

She represented Latvia at the 2019 World Aquatics Championships held in Gwangju, South Korea. She competed in the women's 50 metre freestyle and women's 50 metre butterfly events. In both events she did not advance to compete in the semi-finals.
