= Ģirts Feldbergs =

Latvian swimmer (born 1993)

Personal information
- Born: 17 February 1993 (age 33)
- Height: 192 cm (6 ft 4 in)
- Weight: 84 kg (185 lb)

Sport
- Sport: Swimming
- Strokes: Backstroke, freestyle
- College team: Riga Technical University
Medal record
Men's swimming
Representing Latvia
Baltic States Championships
Silver medal – second place	2021 Klaipėda	50 m backstroke
Silver medal – second place	2021 Klaipėda	100 m backstroke
Bronze medal – third place	2021 Klaipėda	200 m backstroke

Ģirts Feldbergs (born 17 February 1993) is a Latvian swimmer. He competed in the men's 50 metre backstroke event at the 2017 World Aquatics Championships.

At the 2015 Summer Universiade in Gwangju, South Korea, Feldbergs competed in six events: the 50 metre backstroke, 100 metre backstroke, 50 metre freestyle, 100 metre freestyle, 4 × 100 m medley relay and 4 × 100 m freestyle relay.
