= Flag of Latvia =

Republic of Latvia
- Use: Civil and state flag, civil ensign
- Proportion: 1:2
- Adopted: 15 June 1921; Restored on 27 February 1990; Current standardization on 28 November 2018 (in use since 1 January 2019)
- Design: A carmine red field bisected by a narrow white stripe (one-fifth the width of the flag)
- Designed by: Ansis Cīrulis
- Use: Pennant
- Proportion: 5:1
- Adopted: 2009
- Design: A trapezoidal fabric ribbon corresponding to the colors and color proportions of the State Flag

The national flag of Latvia (Latvian: Latvijas karogs) is a triband featuring two wide horizontal stripes of red at the top and bottom, separated by a twice narrower white centre stripe. It was used as the national flag after Latvia became an independent country in 1918. After the Soviet Union invaded and occupied Latvia in 1940, its use was suppressed by the Soviet government. On 27 February 1990, shortly before Latvia regained independence, the government re-adopted the traditional red-white-red flag.

Though officially adopted in 1921, the Latvian flag was used as early as the 13th century, according to the Rhymed Chronicle of Livonia. The red colour is sometimes described as symbolizing the readiness of the Latvians to give the blood from their hearts for freedom and their willingness to defend their sovereignty. An alternative interpretation is that a Latgalian leader was wounded in battle, and the sheet on which he was laid on was stained by his blood, with only the centre stripe of the sheet being left unstained. This story is similar to the legend of the origins of the flag of Austria.

== History ==
The red-white-red Latvian flag is first mentioned in the late medieval Rhymed Chronicle of Livonia (Livländische Reimchronik), which covers the period from 1180 to 1343, and is thus among the oldest flags in the world. The chronicle tells of a battle that took place around 1279, in which ancient Latgalian tribes from Cēsis (Wenden), a city in northern modern-day Latvia, went to war, bearing a 'red flag with a white stripe'.

A separate popular legend recounts the story of a mortally wounded chief of Latgalians who had been wrapped in a white sheet. The part of sheet on which he was lying remained white, and the two edges were coloured by his blood. During the next battle, the bloodstained sheet was used as a flag. According to the legend, this time the Latgalian warriors were successful and drove the enemy away. Since then, Latgalian tribes have been using these colours as their symbol.

Inspired by these historical records, several Latvian nationalists began to use such flags again in the 19th century. The first flag with red field and narrow white stripe concept was made by Valmiera Trade School teacher Marianna Strautmane (1896–1985) in the second half of 1916, according to a sketch made by her colleague, journalist and refugee activist Jānis Lapiņš (1885–1941). This bright-red flag featured a yellow sun on the upper-left corner of the flag, and it later flew over the building of the Valmiera Latvian Society during the Vidzeme Land Meeting in March 1917. Preserved by the Lapiņš family during the Soviet occupation of Latvia in 1940 and in exile in the West after 1944, it was ultimately given to the Cēsis Museum in 1997, where today it is on display in Cēsis Castle.

Textile version of the Latvian flag.

In 1917, a red-white-red flag was used in several events focused on uniting Latvian regions as well as Latvian military formations (e.g. Latvian Riflemen units, Iskolat institutions), and the debate about the visual appearance of the Latvian flag was raised. In May, during a meeting of the Latvian Art Promotion Association (Latviešu mākslas veicināšanas biedrība), several proposals were reviewed, finally, a design by artist Ansis Cīrulis was accepted. Cīrulis' design was also popularized in postcards printed by photographer Jānis Rieksts.

During the Latvian War of Independence, the flag saw ever-growing use by the Latvian Armed Forces, government institutions (e.g. it flew from Riga Castle before and during the Battle of Riga in 1919) and the population. The Latvian national flag, together with the national coat of arms was officially affirmed in this format by a decree of the Constitutional Assembly of Latvia passed on 15 June 1921.

=== Occupation ===
A variation that appeared in anti-Soviet demonstrations.

During the Soviet occupation by the Soviet Union (and briefly during occupation by Nazi Germany), the red-white-red Latvian flag was rendered unusable from 1940 to 1941 and 1944 to 1991. Any production and public display of the national Latvian flag was considered anti-state crime and punishable by law. The first flag of Soviet Latvia was a red flag with the gold hammer and sickle in the top-left corner, with the Latin characters LPSR (Latvijas Padomju Sociālistiskā Republika) above them in gold in a serif font. In 1953, the final version of the flag was adopted. It depicts the Soviet flag with six 1/3 blue wavy bands representing the sea on the bottom.

=== Restoration ===
The local authorities restored the status of the red-white-red flag as the national flag of Latvia on 15 February 1990, one and half years before the formal recognition of Latvian independence by the Soviet Union on 6 September 1991.

== Design ==
A comparison of the physical and digital versions of the flag

According to Latvian law, the Latvian national flag is carmine red with a white horizontal stripe. (Latvian: tumši sarkana (karmīnsarkans), lit. 'dark red'). The colour on the flag is sometimes referred to as Latvian red. The red colour of the Latvian flag is a particularly dark shade, which is composed of brown and purple. The flag's colour proportions are 2:1:2 (the upper and lower red bands each being twice as wide as the central white band), and the ratio of the height of the flag to its width is fixed at 1:2.

On 11 April 1995, the State Heraldic Commission have once chosen Pantone 1807 C for the red colour, this was later replaced by Pantone 201 C on 21 April 2009. On 1 May 2010, the Cabinet of Ministers issued the Procedures for the Application of the Law on the National Flag, which standardized Pantone 19-1629 TPX or 19-1629 TC for red field; an amendment made on 27 November 2018, which came into force 1 January 2019, stating that non-fabric flags, as well as representations produced using other techniques (including digital representations), would use Pantone 201 C, whilst physical flags would continue using 19-1629 TPX/TC.

Flag colors
Proportions and colours of the flag in Pantone
	White	Red (Digital)	Red (Textile)
Pantone	White	201 C	19-1629 TPX or TC
RGB	Red: 255; Green: 255; Blue: 255; Hex: #FFFFFF	Red: 157; Green: 34; Blue: 53; Hex: #9D2235	Red: 119; Green: 53; Blue: 61; Hex: #77353D
CMYK	Cyan: 0% Magenta: 0% Yellow: 0% Black: 0%	Cyan: 40% Magenta: 100% Yellow: 90% Black: 10%	Cyan: 40% Magenta: 100% Yellow: 90% Black: 10%

== Display of the flag ==
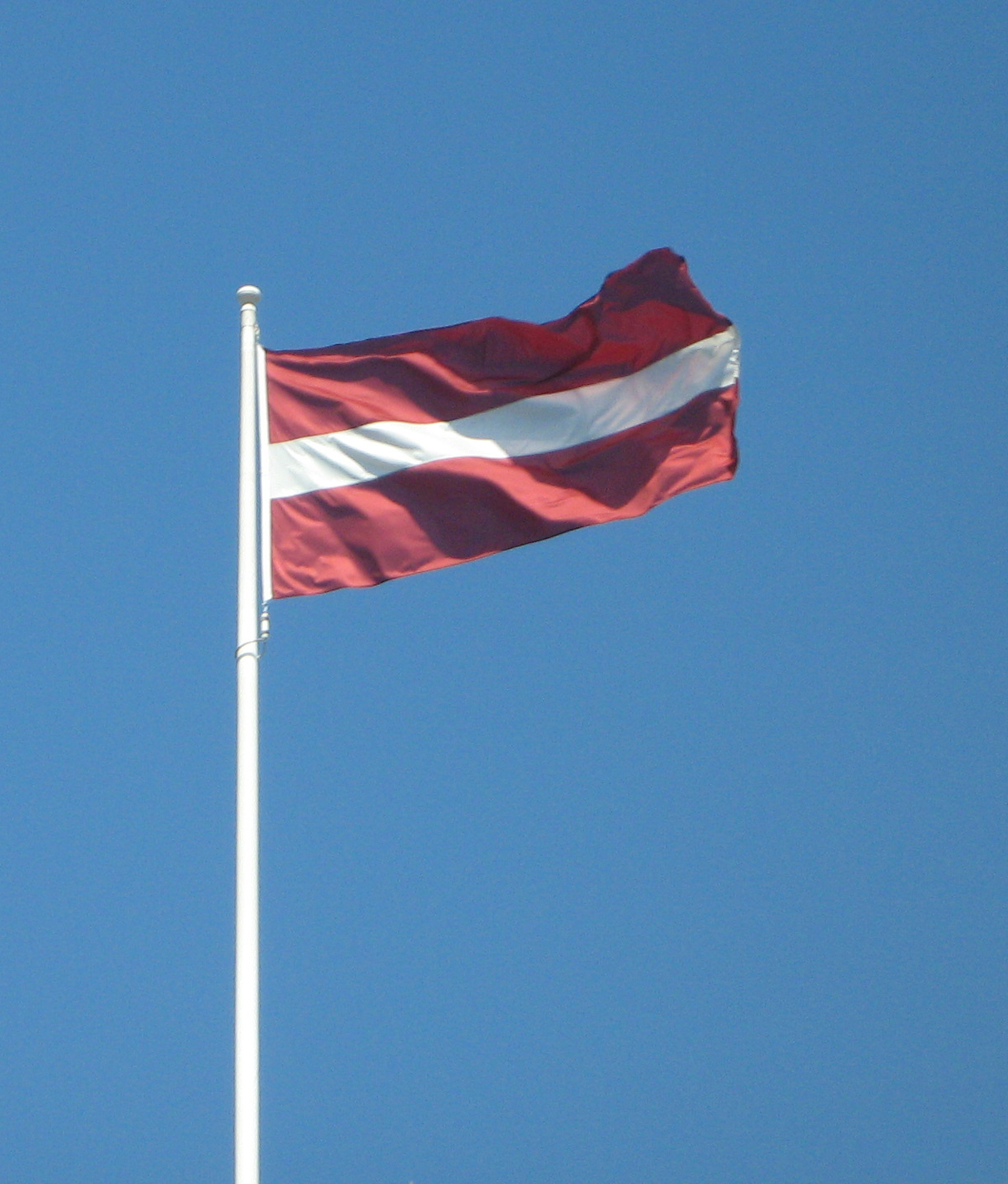
Flagpole

Latvian law states that the flag and national colours can be displayed and used as an ornament if proper respect to the flag is guaranteed. Destruction, disrespectful treatment or incorrect display of the flag is punishable by law.

The flag shall be placed at least 2.5 metres (8 ft 2 in) above the ground and properly secured to the flagstaff. The flagstaff shall be longer than the longest side of the flag, straight, painted white, and preferably made of wood. The finial at the tip of the flagstaff shall be wider than the flagstaff. When the flag is not displayed continuously, it shall be raised at sunrise and lowered at sunset. If flown for a festival or funeral, it shall be raised before and lowered after the end of the occasion.

If the flag is flown from a flagpole in mourning, it shall be raised to half-staff. If fixed to a flagstaff, a black ribbon whose width is 1/20 the width of the flag shall be secured to the flagstaff above the flag; the ribbon shall be of sufficient length to span the width of the flag.

== Flag days ==
- 25 March (in mourning) — In memory of victims of communist genocide
- 1 May — Constitution Day, Labour Day
- 4 May — Restoration of Independence (1990)
- 14 June (in mourning) — In memory of victims of communist genocide
- 17 June (in mourning) — Beginning of the Soviet occupation in Latvia
- 4 July (in mourning) — In memory of victims of the Holocaust (See: The Holocaust in Latvia)
- 11 November — Lāčplēsis Day
- 18 November — Independence Day (1918)
- First Sunday in December (in mourning) — In memory of victims of communist genocide

== Official standards ==
Presidential standard of Latvia

Standard of the prime minister of Latvia

Standard of the speaker of the Saeima of Latvia

Standard of the minister of defence of Latvia

=== Presidential standard of Latvia ===
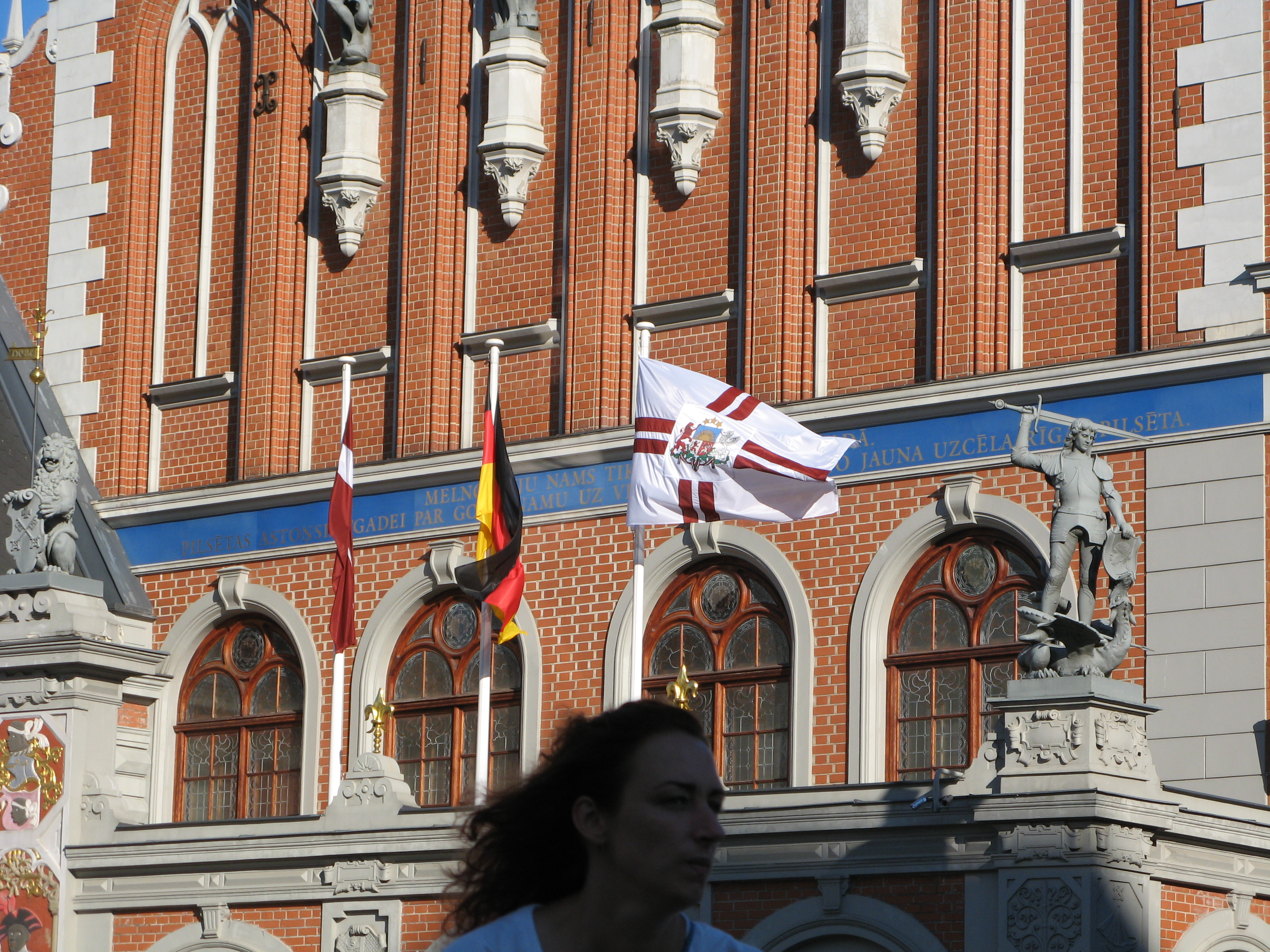
Latvian presidential standard at the presidential chancellery, House of the Blackheads.

The standard of the president is white with the rectangular cross in the colour proportions of the national flag. The centre of the cross covered a white rectangular panel bearing the coat of arms of Latvia. The height of the coat of arms is 1/3 of the width of the Standard, the centre of the sun depicted on the shield of the coat of arms is in the centre of the Standard. The proportion between the width of the national colours and that of the Standard is 1:5. The proportion between the length and width of the Standard is 3:2.

=== Prime Ministerial standard of Latvia ===
The standard of the prime minister is white with the symmetric cross in the colour proportions of the national flag. In top left canton of the flag, the coat of arms is placed. The height of coat of arms is 5/6 of the height of canton, and the sun of coat of arms is in the centre of the canton. The proportion between the width of the national colours and that of the Banner is 1:5. The proportion between the length and width of the Banner is 3:2.

=== Standard of the speaker of the Saeima ===
The standard of the speaker of the Saeima is white with the symmetric cross in the colour proportions of the national flag. In top right canton of the flag the coat of arms is placed. The height of the coat of arms is 5/6 of the height of the canton; the sun of coat of arms is in the centre of the canton. The proportion between the width of the national colours and that of the Banner is 1:5. The proportion between the length and width of the Banner is 3:2.

=== Standard of the minister of defence of Latvia ===
The flag of the defence minister is white with the symmetric cross in the colour proportions of the national flag. In top left canton of the flag the soldier insignia is placed. The height of insignia is 3/5 of the height of canton. The proportion between the width of the national colours and that of the Banner is 1:5. The proportion between the length and width of the Banner is 3:2.

== See also ==
- List of flags of Latvia
- Coat of arms of Latvia
- National Anthem of Latvia
