= Daniils Bobrovs =

Latvian swimmer (born 1997)

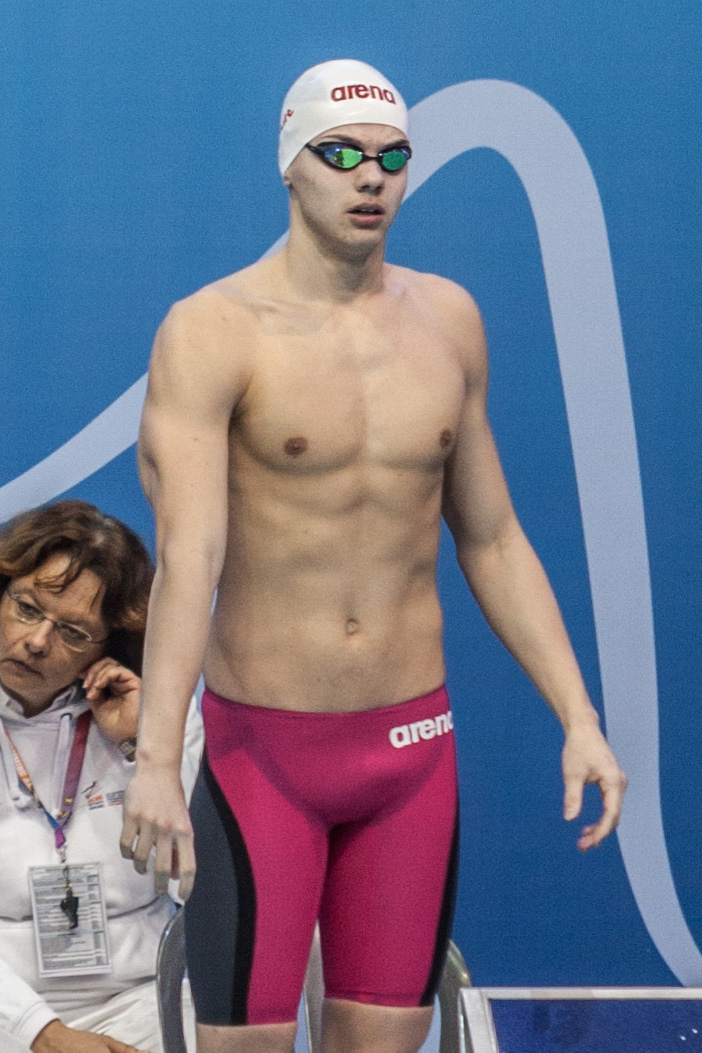

Personal information
- Nationality: Latvian
- Born: 8 October 1997 (age 28) Riga, Latvia

Sport
- Sport: Swimming
Medal record
Men's swimming
Representing Latvia
Baltic States Championships
Silver medal – second place	2017 Riga	100 m breaststroke
Silver medal – second place	2017 Riga	200 m breaststroke
Silver medal – second place	2017 Riga	400 m medley
Silver medal – second place	2021 Klaipėda	100 m breaststroke
Silver medal – second place	2021 Klaipėda	200 m breaststroke

Daniils Bobrovs (born 8 October 1997) is a Latvian swimmer. He competed in the men's 100 metre breaststroke event at the 2017 World Aquatics Championships. In 2019, he represented Latvia at the 2019 World Aquatics Championships held in Gwangju, South Korea.
