= List of swimmers =

Swimming is one of the most popular sports and activities in the world. The following list of swimmers, each of whom has been covered in reliable sources from around the world, is divided up by country, and arranged alphabetically by surname. This list is by no means complete.

== Albania ==
- Gjata, Kreshnik
- Hoxha, Sidni
- Marku, Rovena

== Algeria ==
- Iles, Salim
- Kebbab, Nabil

== Andorra ==
- Cerqueda, Carolina
- Deu, Santiago
- Haciane, Hocine
- Ramírez, Mònica
- Sabaté, Meritxell

== Argentina ==
- Bardach, Georgina
- Blaum, Damián
- Campbell, Jeannette
- Geijo, Pilar
- Meolans, José
- Nicolao, Luis Alberto

== Aruba ==
- Berg, Daniella van den
- Bisslik, Davy
- Le Grand, Jemal
- Roodzant, Jan
- Vrolijk, Roshendra

== Australia ==
- Armstrong, Duncan
- Atherton, Minna
- Barratt, Bronte
- Beaurepaire, Frank
- Beaurepaire, Lily
- Berry, Kevin
- Brooks, Neil
- Buchanan, Glenn
- Campbell, Bronte
- Campbell, Cate
- Chalmers, Kyle
- Charlton, Boy
- Cook, Tamsin
- Coutts, Alicia
- Cusack, Robert
- Delany, Michael
- Dunn, Matthew
- Edmistone, Jade
- Fingleton, Anthony
- Fraser, Dawn
- Fraser-Holmes, Thomas
- Gould, Shane
- Grimsey, Trent
- Hackett, Grant
- Hanson, Brooke
- Henricks, Jon
- Henry, Jodie
- Holland, Stephen
- Horton, Mack
- Huegill, Geoff
- Jones, Leisel
- Kirby, Bill
- Klim, Michael
- Kowalski, Daniel
- Lane, Frederick
- Lange, Darren
- Larkin, Mitch
- Lauterstein, Andrew
- Magnussen, James
- McEvoy, Cameron
- McKeon, David
- McKeon, Emma
- McKeown, Kaylee
- Miatke, Danni
- Monk, Kenrick
- Norris, Justin
- O'Callaghan, Mollie
- O'Neill, Susie
- Palmer, Kylie
- Pearson, Todd
- Perkins, Kieren
- Pieters, Deane
- Rice, Stephanie
- Rickard, Brenton
- Riley, Samantha
- Rooney, Giaan
- Rose, Murray
- Schipper, Jessicah
- Seebohm, Emily
- Sieben, Jon
- Sprenger, Christian
- Stevens, Craig
- Stockwell, Mark
- Sullivan, Eamon
- Stubblety-Cook, Zac
- Tait, Alice
- Taylor, Laura
- Theile, David
- Thomas, Petria
- Thorpe, Ian
- Titmus, Ariarne
- To, Kenneth
- Trickett, Libby
- Welsh, Matthew
- Wilson, Madison

== Austria ==
- Adler, Margarete
- Draxler, Judith
- Haspel, Judith
- Herschmann, Otto
- Jukić, Mirna
- Milch, Klara
- Neumann, Paul
- Rogan, Markus
- Scheff, Otto
- Sticker, Josephine
- Wahle, Otto

== Bahamas ==
- Burrows, Elvis
- Deveaux, Nikia
- Dillette, Alana
- Knowles, Jeremy
- Murray, Allan
- Murray, Christopher
- Rees, Nicholas
- Vanderpool-Wallace, Arianna
- Vythoulkas, Chris

== Bangladesh ==
- Ahmed, Jewel
- Akhter, Doli
- Das, Brojen
- Islam, Karar Samedul
- Khatun, Mahfuza
- Rana, Rubel
- Sagor, Mahfizur Rahman

== Belarus ==
- Baranovskaya, Natalya
- Gerasimenya, Aleksandra
- Gukov, Aleksandr
- Kalinovsky, Dmitry
- Popchanka, Alena
- Rykhlevich, Oleg

== Belgium ==
- Aerents, Jasper
- Arnould, Isabelle
- Bauwens, René
- Bauwens, Ward
- Becue, Brigitte
- Blitz, Gérard
- Boin, Victor
- Bossuyt, Tine
- Buys, Kimberly
- Cam, Sandra
- Caroen, Fernande
- Cludts, Joseph
- Coppieters, Pierre
- Courbet, Félicien
- Croenen, Louis
- Deburghgraeve, Frédérik
- De Combe, Joseph
- Dekoninck, Dieter
- Dreesen, Liesbet
- Dufour, Fabienne
- Feyaerts, Fernand
- Fonteyn, Mathieu
- Gervy, Yseult
- Goffin, Sofie
- Grandjean, Yoris
- Grégoire, Oscar
- Guttenstein, Claire
- Heersbrandt, François
- Lecluyse, Fanny
- Lempereur, Ingrid
- Maene, Stefaan
- Matthysen, Elise
- Meyboom, Herman
- Ryckeman, Brian
- Simons, François
- Surgeloose, Glenn
- Sysmans, Jolien
- Timmers, Pieter
- Van Dievoet, Germaine
- Vangeneugden, Tom
- Van Koeckhoven, Nina
- Vanluchene, Emmanuel
- Van Parijs, Louis
- Van Schelle, Martial
- Vergauwen, Raymonde
- Vermetten, Jean-Pierre
- Wolfs, Sofie
- Wouters, Thierry

== Brazil ==
- Almeida, Kaio de
- Amorim, Patricia
- Arantes, Rômulo
- Baracho, Paula
- Barbosa, Henrique
- Bona, Samuel de
- Bonfim, Bruno
- Borges, Gustavo
- Brochado, Mariana
- Burgos, Renata
- Carmo, Allan do
- Castro, Rodrigo
- Chierighini, Marcelo
- Cielo Filho, Cesár
- Cordeiro, André
- Costa, Leonardo
- Cunha, Ana Marcela
- Delaroli, Flávia
- Delgado, Cyro
- Fernandes, Jorge
- Ferreira, Monique
- Ferreira, Teófilo
- Fischer, Eduardo
- França Silva, Felipe
- Fratus, Bruno
- Guido, Guilherme
- Gusmão, Rebeca
- Jayme, Carlos
- Leal, Cassiano
- Lemos, Tatiana
- Lenk, Maria
- Lima, Felipe
- Lima, Luiz
- Lucca, João de
- Macedo, Marcos
- Madruga, Djan
- Mangabeira, Gabriel
- Maranhão, Joanna
- Martins, Henrique
- Massura, Alexandre
- Mattioli, Marcus
- Medeiros, Etiene
- Molina, Fabíola
- Monteiro, Pedro
- Mósca, Rafael
- Okamoto, Tetsuo
- Okimoto, Poliana
- Oliveira, Larissa
- Oliveira, Nicolas
- Pereira, Thiago
- Prado, Ricardo
- Romero, Rogério
- Rose, Gabrielle
- Salatta, Lucas
- Santos, Manuel dos
- Santos, Nicholas
- Scherer, Fernando
- Souza, José Carlos
- Teixeira, André
- Tomazini, Marcelo
- Valério, Edvaldo
- Villarinho, Diogo

== Bulgaria ==
- Dangalakova, Tanya
- Frenkeva, Antoaneta
- Stoychev, Petar

== Cambodia ==
- Hem Kiry
- Hem Raksmey
- Hem Thon Ponleu
- Ket Sivan

== Canada ==
- Amey, Jessica
- Amundrud, Gail
- Anderson, Gary
- Andrews, Mark
- Bald, Kathy
- Barrett, Casey
- Baumann, Alex
- Beavers, Keith
- Bell, Marilyn
- Braknis, Robert
- Brown, Mike
- Brown, Raymond
- Bernier, Sylvie
- Bowie, Christopher
- Clark, Barbara
- Davis, Victor
- Cerny, Vlastimil
- Chalmers, Christopher
- Cleveland, Jonathan
- Cliff, Leslie
- Condorelli, Santo
- Deglau, Jessica
- Draxinger, Kevin
- Dryden, Nikki
- Duggan, Keltie
- Evanetz, Sarah
- Fish, Erik
- Flood, Lisa
- Fréchette, Sylvie
- Gammel, Erin
- Garapick, Nancy
- Gibson, Cheryl
- Giguère, Nathalie
- Goss, Sandy
- Gurr, Donna
- Haddow, Donald
- Hayden, Brent
- Hazel, Elizabeth
- Higson, Allison
- Hodgson, George
- Howard, Julie
- Hurd, Andrew
- Jardin-Alexander, Anne
- Johns, Brian
- Johnston, Mark
- Kasting, Robert
- Kelly, Jon
- Kerr, Jane
- Knabe, Morgan
- Legault, Hugues
- Legault, Karine
- Longstaff, Moorea
- Lupien, Yannick
- Mahony, William
- Mason, Michael
- McLellan, David
- Melien, Lori
- Mendelson, Shier
- Mintenko, Mike
- Murphy, Sean
- Myden, Curtis
- Nicholls, Laura
- Noall, Patrica
- Nugent, Andrea
- O'Hare, Turlough
- Oleksiak, Penny
- Parenti, Eddy
- Petelski, Christin
- Pierse, Annamay
- Pineau, Jacinthe
- Ponting, Tom
- Pound, Dick
- Robertson, Bruce
- Ruck, Taylor
- Say, Rick
- Schwartz, Andrea
- Shakespeare, Shannon
- Simard, Sophie
- Smith-Wiber, Becky
- Smith, Graham
- Smith, Shannon
- Stewart, Courtenay
- Stewart, Mary
- Stoody, Kathleen
- Sweetnam, Nancy
- Tanner, Elaine
- Taylor, Harry
- Tewksbury, Mark
- Topham, Kristin
- Vandermeulen, Gary
- Versfeld, Mark
- Ward, Darren
- Wilkinson, Julia
- Wurzburger, Debra

== China ==
- Fu Yuanhui
- He Cihong
- Huang Xiaomin
- Jiao Liuyang
- Liu Limin
- Liu Xiang
- Liu Zige
- Lü Bin
- Luo Xuejuan
- Ning Zetao
- Pan Zhanle
- Qi Hui
- Qian Hong
- Shen Duo
- Sun Yang
- Wang Shun
- Wu Peng
- Xu Jiayu
- Yang Aihua
- Yang Wenyi
- Yang Yu
- Ye Shiwen
- Yu Zidi
- Yuan Yuan
- Zhao Jing
- Zhang Lin
- Zhang Yufei
- Zhuang Yong

== Colombia ==
- Becerra, Camilo
- Bermúdez, Alejandro
- Ceballos, Isabel
- Duguet, Paola
- Jácome, Fernando
- Martínez, Germán
- Pinzón, Omar
- Restrepo, Pablo

== Costa Rica ==
- Poll, Claudia
- Poll, Silvia

== Croatia ==
- Draganja, Duje
- Jovanović, Sanja
- Kožulj, Gordan
- Milošević, Miloš
- Rogulj, Vanja
- Strahija, Marko
- Šitić, Karla
- Todorović, Mario

== Cuba ==
- Armas, Joel
- Bent, Neisser
- Carrío, Pedro
- Falcón, Rodolfo
- García, Hanser
- García, Yohan
- Garrido, Ernesto
- González, Ana María
- González, Mario
- Hernández, Marcos
- Medel, Pedro
- Núñez, Imaday
- Rodríguez, Gunter
- Sanguily, Manuel
- Silverio, Nicasio
- Smith, Leonel "Bebito"
- Villarreal, Heysi

== Czech Republic ==
- Hlaváčková, Ilona
- Svoboda, Květoslav

== Denmark ==
- Carstensen, Jacob
- Friis, Lotte
- Hveger, Ragnhild
- Jacobsen, Mette
- Jensen, Ditte
- Nielsen, Benny
- Nielsson, Susanne
- Ørnstedt, Louise
- Ottesen, Jeanette
- Puggaard, Berit
- Raaby, Britt
- Skou, Sophia
- Sørensen, Inge

== Egypt ==
- Elwani, Rania
- Osman, Farida

== Equatorial Guinea ==
- Barila Bolopa, Paula
- Moussambani, Eric

== Estonia ==
- Aljand, Martti
- Aljand, Triin
- Baldin, Aleksander
- Haustov, Danil
- Kolukanova, Jana
- Liivamägi, Martin
- Mälberg, Miko
- Olvik, Andres
- Pachel, Raiko
- Partõka, Elina
- Petrova, Jelena
- Põld, Anna-Liisa
- Sei, Indrek
- Sidorkin, Vladimir

== Faroe Islands ==
- Joensen, Pál

== Fiji ==
- Ah Koy, Rachel
- Buadromo, Matelita
- Elaisa, Paul
- Probert, Carl
- Puamau, Caroline
- Sorby, Warren

== Finland ==
- Blomqvist, Janne
- Hagman, Mia
- Hanski, Vesa
- Hård, Jere
- Harmokivi, Paula
- Heikkilä, Marja
- Kasvio, Antti
- Koivisto, Anu
- Lehtinen, Petteri
- Rajakylä, Matti
- Salmela, Minna
- Seppälä, Hanna-Maria
- Sievinen, Jani
- Varonen, Kalle

== France ==
- Abrard, David
- Agnel, Yannick
- Arbogast, Émile
- Balmy, Coralie
- Barnier, Romain
- Berlioux, Monique
- Bernard, Alain
- Boiteux, Jean
- Bonnet, Charlotte
- Bordeau, Christophe
- Bousquet, Frédérick
- Caron, Kiki
- Caron, Stéphan
- Croizon, Philippe
- Delcourt, Frédéric
- Depickère, Ludovic
- Duboscq, Hugues
- Dufour, Simon
- Esposito, Franck
- Faure, Karyn
- Figues, Solenne
- Fougeroud, Olivier
- Gilot, Fabien
- Guillou, Laurence
- Grageon, Lara
- Gutzeit, Bruno
- Holderbach, David
- Iacono, Franck
- Journet, Laurent
- Kalfayan, Christophe
- Jany-Sendral, Ginette
- Lacourt, Camille
- Leblanc, David
- Lefert, Clément
- Leveaux, Amaury
- Louvrier, Pascaline
- Magnier, Christine
- Mallet, Grégory
- Manaudou, Florent
- Manaudou, Laure
- Maracineanu, Roxana
- Marchand, Christophe
- Marchand, Xavier
- Marvingt, Marie
- Metella, Malia
- Metella, Mehdy
- Muffat, Camille
- Muller, Aurélie
- Neuville, Laurent
- Roger, Pierre
- Penicaud, Cédric
- Perez Dortona, Giacomo
- Plewinski, Catherine
- Popchanka, Alena
- Pou, Michel
- Prunier, Cécile
- Rostoucher, Nicolas
- Schott, Franck
- Sicot, Julien
- Stasiulis, Benjamin
- Stravius, Jérémy
- Supiot, Claire
- Talli, Christian
- Tallon, Léon
- Tanguy, Gaby
- Taris, Jean
- Theuriet, André
- Thomas, Colette
- Vabre, Cylia
- Vallerey, Georges
- Vandeplancke, Albert
- Vanzeveren, Édouard
- Vasseur, Paul
- Wattel, Marie
- Wurtz, Suzanne
- Zeibig, Ernst Emil
- Zwiller, Marius

== Germany ==
- Almsick, Franziska van
- Baltrusch, Frank
- Biedermann, Paul
- Buschschulte, Antje
- Daßler, Uwe
- Conrad, Lars
- Deibler, Markus
- Deibler, Steffen
- Driesen, Steffen
- Dubrovin, Konstantin
- Ender, Kornelia
- Friedrich, Heike
- Geißler, Ines
- Geweniger, Ute
- Groß, Michael
- Halgasch, Sebastian
- Hase, Dagmar
- Henke, Jana
- Hentke, Franziska
- Hochstein, Erik
- Hoffmann, Jörg
- Hunger, Daniela
- Keller, Christian
- Koch, Marco
- Kruppa, Jens
- Kühl, Patrick
- Lampe, Oliver
- Liebs, Annika
- Lodziewski, Sven
- Matthes, Roland
- Mehlhorn, Annika
- Meissner, Katrin
- Möhring, Anke
- Nord, Kathleen
- Osygus, Simone
- Otto, Kristin
- Pinger, Mark
- Pollack, Andrea
- Richter, Dirk
- Rupprath, Thomas
- Schneider, Petra
- Sirch, Cornelia
- Spanneberg, Torsten
- Stellmach, Manuela
- Steffen, Britta
- Stockbauer, Hannah
- Strauß, Astrid
- Tauber, Ulrike
- Theloke, Stev
- Tröger, Christian
- Völker, Sandra
- Warnecke, Mark
- Weigang, Birte
- Zesner, Steffen
- Zimmermann, Katrin

== Great Britain ==
- Abraham, Gary
- Adlington, Rebecca
- Annison, Harold
- Astbury, Andrew
- Atkinson, Joanne
- Balfour, Kirsty
- Barker, Florence
- Battersby, Thomas
- Beckett, Julia
- Besford, John
- Bircher, Alan
- Black, Ian
- Bowman, Sandra
- Brown, Adam
- Burnett, Simon
- Callis, Paul
- Carlin, Jazmin
- Carry, David
- Carson, Gladys
- Charlesworth, Richard
- Clayton, Andrew
- Cochran, Neil
- Cook, Chris
- Cooke, Rebecca
- Cooper, Joyce
- Cooper, Todd
- Courtman, Percy
- Cozens, Chris
- Cripps, Annabelle
- Croft, June
- Cunningham, Colin
- Dale, Euan
- Davenport, Ross
- Davey, John
- Davies, David
- Davies, Sharron
- Davies, Valerie
- Deakins, Joanne
- Dearing, Alice
- Derbyshire, John
- Easter, Paul
- Edwards, Margaret
- Fibbens, Mike
- Fletcher, Jennie
- Foot, Caroline
- Foster, Mark
- Foster, William
- Gandy, Ellen
- Gentleman, Allan
- Gentleman, Robert
- Gibson, Catherine
- Gibson, James
- Gilchrist, Kristopher
- Gillingham, Nick
- Goddard, James
- Goodhew, Duncan
- Gordon, Elenor
- Gould, Julie
- Grinham, Judy
- Guy, James
- Haffield, Thomas
- Halsall, Francesca
- Hardcastle, Sarah
- Harding, Phyllis
- Haresnape, Herbert
- Harris, Martin
- Hatfield, Jack
- Haywood, Kate
- Henry, William
- Hickman, James
- Hockin, Ben
- Holman, Frederick
- Howe, Paul
- Hubble, Philip
- Hughes, Edna
- Hunter, Andrew
- Jackson, Joanne
- James, Hilda
- Jamieson, Michael
- Jameson, Andrew
- Jameson, Helen
- Jarvie, Margaret
- Jarvis, John
- Jeans, Constance
- Jones, Alyson
- Kelly, Margaret
- Kemp, Peter
- King, Elen
- King, Jaime
- Kirton, James
- Lee, Roland
- Long, Giles
- Lonsborough, Anita
- Lowe, David
- Lowe, Jemma
- Ludgrove, Linda
- Maden, Richard
- Marshall, Melanie
- Mayne, Edith
- McClatchey, Caitlin
- McDowall, Margaret
- McGregor, Robert
- McKenzie, Grace
- Meadows, Gavin
- Mew, Darren
- Miley, Hannah
- Milwain, Dean
- Moore, Belle
- Moorhouse, Adrian
- Morton, Lucy
- Osgerby, Ann
- Palmer, Paul
- Parrack, James
- Parry, Stephen
- Patten, Cassandra
- Payne, Keri-anne
- Peaty, Adam
- Peter, Edward
- Pickering, Karen
- Price, Sarah
- Pugh, Lewis
- Radcliffe, Charlotte
- Radmilovic, Paulo
- Rawlinson, Olivia
- Read, Michael
- Renwick, Robert
- Robinson, William
- Rock, Michael
- Rolph, Susan ("Sue")
- Romain, Roy
- Ruckwood, Adam
- Salter, James
- Savage, Leslie
- Sexton, Katy
- Sheppard, Alison
- Simmonds, Elizabeth
- Smith, Graeme
- Smith, Trevor
- Paul, Sparkes
- Spiers, Annie
- Spofforth, Gemma
- Steer, Irene
- Steward, Natalie
- Stewart, Cissie
- Streeter, Alison
- Sutton, Reginald
- Sylvester, Jessica
- Tait, Gregor
- Tancock, Liam
- Tanner, Irene
- Taylor, Henry
- Turner, Michael
- Varcoe, Helen
- Walker, Fraser
- Whitehead, Adam
- Wilkie, David
- Wilson, Ian
- Woodroffe, Martyn

== Greece ==
- Gianniotis, Spyridon

== Guatemala ==
- Morales, Gisela

== Hong Kong ==
- Au, Stephanie
- Fong, Alex
- Wilson, Hannah

== Hungary ==
- Bárány, István
- Bartha, Károly
- Bernek, Péter
- Biczó, Bence
- Cseh, László
- Csépe, Gabriella
- Csik, Ferenc
- Csordás, György
- Czene, Attila
- Darnyi, Tamás
- Deutsch, Tamás
- Egerszegi, Krisztina
- Flaskay, Mihály
- Gáspár, Zsolt
- Güttler, Károly
- Gyarmati, Andrea
- Gyenge, Valéria
- Gyurta, Dániel
- Hajós, Alfréd
- Halmay, Zoltán
- Hargitay, András
- Horváth, Péter
- Hosszú, Katinka
- Jakabos, Zsuzsanna
- Kádas, Géza
- Kapás, Boglárka
- Kenderesi, Tamás
- Késely, Ajna
- Kerékjártó, Tamás
- Kis, Gergő
- Kiss, Géza
- Kovács, Ágnes
- Kozma, Dominik
- Littomeritzky, Mária
- Milák, Kristóf
- Mitró, György
- Mutina, Ágnes
- Novák-Gerard, Éva
- Nyéki, Imre
- Risztov, Éva
- Rózsa, Norbert
- Szabados, Béla
- Szabó, József
- Szabó, Tünde
- Székely, Éva
- Szőke, Katalin
- Szilágyi, Liliána
- Szilágyi, Zoltán
- Temes, Judit
- Tumpek, György
- Verrasztó Zoltán
- Verrasztó, Dávid
- Verrasztó, Evelyn
- Wladár, Sándor
- Zubor, Attila

== Iceland ==
- Arnarson, Örn
- Árnason, Árni Már
- Barðdal, Hörður
- Bateman, Sarah
- Bjargardóttir, Lára Hrund
- Guðmundsson, Hjalti
- Gústafsdóttir, Eygló Ósk
- Hannesdóttir, Eva
- Haraldsdóttir, Erla Dögg
- Heimisdóttir, Íris Edda
- Konráðsdóttir, Eydis
- Kristjánsdóttir, Kolbrún Ýr
- Lúthersdóttir, Hrafnhildur
- McKee, Anton Sveinn
- Ragnarsdóttir, Ragnheiður
- Reynisson, Hjörtur Már
- Ríkarðsson, Ríkarður
- Sigurðardóttir, Elín
- Sveinsson, Jakob Jóhann
- Sverrisdóttir, Sigrún Brá
- Sverrisson, Geir

== India ==
- Khade, Virdhawal
- Millet, Nisha
- Sharma, Bhakti
- Tandon, Shikha

== Indonesia ==
- Anggawijaya, Ricky
- Bera, Richard Sam
- Chandra, Steven
- Dewi, Ressa Kania
- Dimyati, Achmad
- Evato, Anandia
- Gultom, Martha
- Gunawan, Indra
- Laura, Cinta
- Marita, Fibriani Ratna
- Nasution, Muhammad Akbar
- Nasution, Habib
- Nasution, Elsa Manora
- Nasution, Zakaria
- Ngaimin, Agus
- Niode, Lukman
- Permatahani, Azzahra
- Prawira, Aflah Fadlan
- Ramdhani, Raina
- Sidiq, Triady Fauzi
- Sudartawa, I Gede Siman
- Sugriat, Wirmandi
- Suharko, Habib
- Sumono, Kris
- Sutanto, Albert
- Sutanto, Felix
- Sutanto, Glenn Victor
- Tobing, Ria
- Utomo, Donny
- Yosaputra, Yessy
- Wibowo, Andy
- Wu, Chuanyu

== Ireland ==
- Fitzsimons, David
- Murphy, Gráinne
- Smith, Michelle

== Israel ==
- Alexeev, Vadim
- Barnea, Guy
- Be'eri, Tom
- Bichman, Adi
- Bruck, Yoav
- Chammah, Itai
- Gath, Yoav
- Groumi, Eran
- Halika, Michael
- Haspel, Judith
- Ivry, Amit
- Kutler, Dan
- Leibovitch, Keren
- Mandel, Alon
- Manziola, Alexei
- Nevo, Gal
- Shapira Bar-Or, Nimrod
- Stricker, Tal
- Toumarkin, Yakov
- Urbach, Eithan

== Italy ==
- Battistelli, Stefano
- Boggiatto, Alessio
- Brembilla, Emiliano
- Calligaris, Novella
- Detti, Gabriele
- Fioravanti, Domenico
- Formentini, Marco
- Franceschi, Giovanni
- Guarducci, Marcello
- Lamberti, Giorgio
- Magnini, Filippo
- Merisi, Emanuele
- Paltrinieri, Gregorio
- Pellegrini, Federica
- Quadarella, Simona
- Rosolino, Massimiliano
- Rummolo, Davide

== Jamaica ==
- Atkinson, Alia
- Atkinson, Janelle
- Atkinson, Jevon
- Brinn, Sion
- Chuck, Angela
- Marsh, Allan
- Moodie, Natasha
- Nash, Paul

== Japan ==
- Goto, Toru
- Hamaguchi, Yoshihiro
- Hashizume, Shiro
- Hoshi, Natsumi
- Ikee, Rikako
- Imoto, Naoko
- Irie, Ryosuke
- Ishimoto, Takashi
- Iwasaki, Kyoko
- Kitajima, Kosuke
- Matsuda, Takeshi
- Minamoto, Sumika
- Asahina, Aoi
- Miyake, Aiko
- Morita, Tomomi
- Nakamura, Mai
- Nakao, Miki
- Okumura, Yoshihiro
- Onishi, Junko
- Seto, Daiya
- Shibata, Ai
- Suzuki, Daichi
- Suzuki, Hiroshi
- Taguchi, Nobutaka
- Tajima, Yasuko
- Tanaka, Masami
- Watanabe, Kanako
- Tanikawa, Teijiro
- Yamamoto, Takashi
- Yamanaka, Tsuyoshi
- Yamanoi, Eri

== Kenya ==
- Ajulu-Bushell, Achieng
- Awori, Maria
- Brunlehner, Sylvia
- Donde, Eva
- Dunford, David
- Dunford, Jason
- Kim Jin-Woo
- Pragassa, Tory
- Shah, Amar

== Laos ==
- Chindavong, Thepphithak
- Inthavong, Phathana
- Ounkhamphanyavong, Sikhounxay
- Phommasen, Soulasen
- Vongphachanh, Bounthanom
- Vongphachanh, Vilayphone

== Latvia ==
- Deičmans, Guntars
- Dūda, Andrejs
- Jakovļevs, Artūrs
- Kalmikova, Margarita
- Kalmikovs, Valērijs
- Kalniņš, Uvis
- Miloslavskis, Romāns
- Murāns, Pāvels
- Ņikitina, Gabriela
- Ozoliņa, Agnese

== Liechtenstein ==
- Hassler, Julia

== Lithuania ==
- Andrijauskas, Paulius
- Beiga, Nerijus
- Bilis, Simonas
- Binevičius, Saulius
- Bružas, Mindaugas
- Dautartas, Edvinas
- Dvariškytė, Raminta
- Gimbutis, Rolandas
- Grigalionis, Darius
- Janušaitis, Vytautas
- Juozaitis, Arvydas
- Kačiušytė, Lina
- Kazakevičiūtė, Urtė
- Ladavičiūtė, Jūratė
- Margevičius, Deividas
- Mažuolis, Raimundas
- Meilutytė, Rūta
- Mileišytė, Rugilė
- Packevičius, Minvydas
- Petrutytė, Laura
- Rapšys, Danas
- Sadauskas, Mindaugas
- Šalčius, Rimvydas
- Savickas, Arūnas
- Ščerbinskaitė, Jūratė
- Šidlauskas, Andrius
- Špokas, Mindaugas
- Suškov, Pavel
- Titenis, Giedrius
- Užkuraitytė, Birutė
- Valaitis, Aurimas
- Viktoravičius, Paulius
- Želvienė, Dita
- Žulpa, Robertas

== Luxembourg ==
- Carnol, Laurent
- Decker, Luc
- Heinz, Lara
- Kemp-Arendt, Nancy
- Mailliet, Christine
- Prins, Alwin de
- Stacchiotti, Raphaël

== Madagascar ==
- Andriamanjatoarimanana, Tojohanitra
- Fils Rabetsara, Estellah
- Rajohnson, Erik
- Ramanantsoa, Tsilavina
- Ramanisa, Mbolatiana
- Razakarivony, Jean Luc

== Malaysia ==
- Mydin, Abdul Malik

== Malta ==
- Chetcuti, Andrew

== Mexico ==
- Gaja, Gabriela
- González, Erika
- González, Rodrigo
- Koerner, Heike
- Marmolejo, Adriana
- Marmolejo, Ricardo
- Mendoza, Ana
- Muñoz, Felipe
- Sánchez, Laura

== Monaco ==
- Fauré, Sylvain
- Ravera, Jean Laurent
- Trinquier, Angélique

== Mongolia ==
- Altantuyaa, Sanjaajamtsyn
- Dashtserengiin Saintsetseg
- Galbadrakh, Ganaagiin
- Oyuungerel, Gantömöriin
- Tamir, Andryein

== Myanmar ==
- Aung, Moe Thu
- Kyaw, Lin Tin
- Kyaw Zin
- Tin Maung Ni

== Netherlands ==
- Aartsen, Stefan
- Aggele, Robin van
- Alphen, Jopie van
- Baans, Madelon
- Balkenende, Hetty
- Bank, Linda
- Baron, Marie
- Baumeister, Truus
- Beek, Rinus van
- Benenga, Bouke
- Benenga, Lamme
- Bentum, Conny van
- Bergsma, Bert
- Beumer, Toos
- Bimolt, Klenie
- Boer, Linda de
- Bolten, Alida
- Bonnier, Lies
- Bonte, Bob
- Bontekoe, Johan
- Boonstra, Albert
- Bos, Nel
- Bosga, Monique
- Bouwman, Jan
- Braun, Marie
- Brienesse, Karin
- Brigitha, Enith
- Bruijn, Inge de
- Bruins, Rika
- Brzoskowski, Maarten
- Bulten, Kira
- Bunschoten, Hansje
- Buter, Cobie
- Buys, Frieke
- Cortlever, Johan
- Damen, Gijs
- Damen, José
- Dekker, Inge
- Dekker, Lia
- Dekker, Ron
- Dijk, Edith van
- Dobber, Rini
- Dreesens, Dion
- Drenth, Elt
- Driebergen, Nick
- Drost, Frank
- Drost, Johannes
- Drost, Monique
- Drost, Peter
- Dybiona, Patrick
- Edelijn, Diane
- Eefting, Fred
- Ekris, Dicky van
- Elzerman, Ellen
- Elzerman, Hans
- Elzerman, Henk
- Elzerman, Josien
- Empel, Rob van
- Faber, Linda
- Feggelen, Iet van
- Gaillard, Greetje
- Garritsen, Nel
- Gastelaars, Cocky
- Geelen, Pie
- Geurts, Carla
- Goor, Hans van
- Groen, Annemarie
- Groot, Chantal
- Groot, Jannie de
- Haan, Ada den
- Hamburg, Roger van
- Heemskerk, Femke
- Heemskerk, Marianne
- Heijting-Schuhmacher, Irma
- Hemert, Mirjam van
- Henneken, Thamar
- Heukels, Betty
- Hofland, Tineke
- Hofwegen, Wilma van
- Holst, Ewout
- Hom, Tonnie
- Hoogenband, Pieter van den
- Horst, Ria van der
- Hoving, Kees
- Janssen, Martine
- Janus, Marjan
- Jiskoot, Jan
- Jong, Reggie de
- Jonge, Saskia de
- Kastein, Jenny
- Keizer, Joris
- Kenkhuis, Johan
- Kienhuis, Job
- Kievit, Kees
- Kint, Cor
- Klapwijk, Truus
- Klooster, Ton van
- Kneppers, Andrea
- Köhler, Sjaak
- Kok, Ada
- Kok, Gretta
- Kok, Mary
- Kort, Gérard de
- Korte, Joke de
- Korteweg, Gerrit
- Kosten, Annabel
- Koster, Jans
- Kraan, Greetje
- Kroes, Hans
- Kromowidjojo, Ranomi
- Kroon, Ron
- Kruisdijk, François van
- Kuil, René van der
- Kuipers, Benno
- Laddé, Corrie
- Lagerberg, Tineke
- Langerhorst, Dick
- Lassooij, Gerda
- Lasterie, Adrie
- Lemmen, Celina
- Lijesen, Bastiaan
- Lijesen, Robert
- Linden, Maritzka van der
- Linssen-Vaessen, Marie-Louise
- Looijs, Truus
- Luiken, Stefanie
- Maas, Annelies
- Malcorps, Trude
- Marsman, Margot
- Masseurs, Manon
- Mastenbroek, Rie
- Mazereeuw, Wijda
- Meer, Jolande van der
- Meer, Maud van der
- Meijer, Eduard
- Mensonides, Wieger
- Meuring, Frits
- Moes, Linda
- Muis, Marianne
- Muis, Mildred
- Neumann, Robin
- Nijhuis, Moniek
- Nijs, Judith de
- Nijs, Lenie de
- Ooms, Piet
- Osch, Henri van
- Ouden, Willy den
- Oudt, Aad
- Oversloot, Puck
- Penterman, Hennie
- Plaats, Diana van der
- Posthumus, Sieta
- Postma, Angela
- Prijdekker, Peter
- Puts, Jesse
- Ran, Ineke
- Reijers, Desi
- Rentema, Hella
- Ressang, Karim
- Riet, Alie te
- Rijnbeek, Dennis
- Rijnders, Anke
- Roodenburch, Bartholomeus
- Rooijen, Manon van
- Rouwendaal, Sharon van
- Rover, Jolanda de
- Schaap, Lydia
- Schans, Johan
- Scheffer, Stans
- Schimmel, Corrie
- Schlingemann, Edsard
- Schoutsen, Bob
- Schreuder, Hinkelien
- Schwietert, Ben
- Selbach, Jopie
- Senff, Nida
- Sikkens, Cobie
- Sitters, Bert
- Smit, Minouche
- Smits, Eva
- Spoel, Martin van der
- Starink, Brenda
- Staveren, Petra van
- Steenbergen, Marrit
- Stekelenburg, Lennart
- Stijl, Alie
- Stokkers, Patricia
- Stolk, Kyle
- Stralen, Haike van
- Stroomberg, Jo
- Tamminga, Bastiaan
- Terink, Rieneke
- Termeulen, Hannie
- Terpstra, Erica
- Tigelaar, Ineke
- Timmermans, Ans
- Tjebbes, Joris
- Toussaint, Kira
- Troost, Jopie
- Turk, Willy den
- Valkengoed, Jolijn van
- Valkengoed, Thijs van
- Veen, Rie van
- Veen, Jitse van der
- Veens, Mark
- Veld, André in het
- Veldhuis, Marleen
- Velsen, Ria van
- Velsen, Wilma van
- Velthoven, Bas van
- Verlinden, Joeri
- Vermaat, Marianne
- Vermeulen, Esmee
- Verschuren, Sebastiaan
- Verstappen, Annemarie
- Vervoorn, Cees
- Vierdag, Maria
- Vlieghuis, Kirsten
- Vliet, Nel van
- Voorbij, Atie
- Voorn, Koosje van
- Voskes, Elles
- Vriens, Hemmie
- Waalberg, Jopie
- Wagner, Tini
- Weerdenburg, Winnie van
- Weertman, Ferry
- Weeteling, Bep
- Weeteling, Jan
- Weijden, Maarten van der
- Wielema, Geertje
- Wildeboer, Olaf
- Wildt, Pauline van der
- Willemse, Herman
- Winkel, Cees Jan
- Winkel, Corrie
- Wouda, Marcel
- Woutering, Ronald
- Zastrow, Mitja
- Zijden, Mark van der
- Zuijdweg, Martijn
- Zwering, Klaas-Erik

== New Zealand ==
- Burmester, Moss
- Gibson, Cameron
- Herring, Mark
- Kent, Dean
- Loader, Danyon
- Norfolk, Helen
- Perrott, Rebecca
- Simcic-Forrest, Anna
- Swanepoel, Corney

== Norway ==
- Dalby, Irene
- Dale Oen, Alexander
- Gundersen, Gunnar
- Hetland, Aleksander

== Peru ==
- Alvizuri, Alejandro
- Horning, Karen
- Velásquez Claudia

== Philippines ==
- Molina, Miguel

== Poland ==
- Baranowska, Katarzyna
- Cwalina, Krzysztof
- Czopek, Agnieszka
- Jędrzejczak, Otylia
- Kizierowski, Bartosz
- Korzeniowski, Paweł
- Kuczko, Sławomir
- Pęczak, Alicja
- Podkościelny, Mariusz
- Sawrymowicz, Mateusz
- Siembida, Mariusz
- Szukała, Rafał
- Wojdat, Artur

== Portugal ==
- Cerqueira Dias, Nuno Miguel

== Puerto Rico ==
- Berrocal, Carlos
- Busquets, Ricardo
- Cañales, Fernando
- Cañales, Francisco
- Catinchi, Orlando
- Daly, John
- García, Vanessa
- Jesús, José-Ricardo de
- Livingston, Andrew
- Nazario, Carlos
- Pérez, Arnaldo

== Romania ==
- Bădiță, Cezar
- Butacu, Nicolae
- Câșlaru-Coada, Beatrice
- Coman, Dragoș
- Diaconescu, Ioana
- Gherghel, Ioan
- Herea, Florina
- Ivan, Nicolae
- Mocanu, Diana
- Lung, Noemi
- Păduraru, Simona
- Potec, Camelia
- Udroiu, Raluca

== Russia ==
- Belitz-Geiman, Semyon
- Chupkov, Anton
- Grinev, Vladislav
- Kolesnikov, Kliment
- Komarova, Stanislava
- Kulikov, Vladislav
- Lagunov, Evgeny
- Minakov, Andrey
- Morozov, Vladimir
- Pankratov, Denis
- Pimankov, Denis
- Polyakov, Anatoly
- Popov, Alexander
- Prigoda, Gennadiy
- Prilukov, Yuri
- Rylov, Evgeny
- Sadovyi, Yevgeny
- Salnikov, Vladimir
- Sedov, Evgeny
- Selkov, Vladimir
- Sloudnov, Roman
- Sutyagina, Natalya
- Verevka, Oxana
- Vyatchanin, Arkady
- Yefimova, Yulia

== San Marino ==
- Muccioli, Simona
- Mularoni, Diego
- Nicolini, Emanuele
- Tini, Clelia

== Saudi Arabia ==
- Kudmani, Ahmed
- Muhana, Bader

== Serbia ==
- Čavić, Milorad
- Higl, Nađa
- Lenđer, Ivan
- Marković, Vladan
- Najdanovski, Miroslava
- Silađi, Čaba
- Siljevski, Radovan
- Stjepanović, Velimir

== Singapore ==
- Ang Peng Siong
- Chay, Mark
- Koh, Desmond
- Tan Lee Yu Gary
- Tao Li
- Teo, Nicolette
- Thum Ping Tjin
- Yeo, Joscelin

== Slovakia ==
- Moravcová, Martina
- Križko, Ľuboš

== Slovenia ==
- Babič, Lavra
- Bučar, Jure
- Godec, Jernej
- Godina, Tanja
- Isaković, Sara
- Kejžar, Alenka
- Kejžar, Nataša
- Klinar, Anja
- Kozelj, Matjaž
- Mankoč, Peter
- Majcen, Igor
- Majcen, Nace
- Markič, Matjaž
- Medvešek, Blaž
- Milenkovič, Marko
- Šparovec, Metka
- Strel, Martin
- Tahirovič, Emil
- Zdešar, Bojan

== South Africa ==
- Brukman, Jill
- Clos, Chad le
- Dedekind, Brendon
- Fairlie, Ann
- Ferns, Lyndon
- Godfrey, George
- Harrison, Joan
- Heyns, Penelope
- Kriel, Marianne
- Loots, Mandy
- Muir, Karen
- Nash, Barbara
- Neethling, Ryk
- Parkin, Terence
- Schoeman, Roland
- Skinner, Jonty
- Toit, Natalie du
- Townsend, Darian
- Williams, Peter
- Wittstock, Charlene
- Zandberg, Gerhard

== South Korea ==
- Park Tae-hwan

== Spain ==
- Ballester, José Luis
- Becerra, Lourdes
- Belmonte, Mireia
- Benavides, Juan
- Caballero, Melissa
- Capdevila, Marc
- Cerón, Blanca
- Edo, Teo
- Esparza, Itziar
- Fernández, Joaquín
- Franco, Barbara
- Franco, Claudia
- Garabatos, Susanna
- García, Mireia
- Hviid, Frederik
- López, Sergio
- López-Zubero, David
- López-Zubero, Martin
- Lorente, Eduardo
- Madrid, Fátima
- María, Ivette
- Meca, David
- Muñoz, Rafa
- Noriega, Javier
- Olay, María
- Ortega, David
- Palomo, Ana Belén
- Parera, Silvia
- Peláez, María
- Pérez, Jorge
- Pérez, Sara
- Piñera, Eva
- Ramos, Arantxa
- Ramos, Carlos
- Rivera, Marcos
- Roca, Laura
- Rouba, Tatiana
- Sánchez, Jorge
- Villaécija, Erika
- Vives, Roser
- Wildeboer, Aschwin
- Wildeboer, Olaf
- Zhivanevskaya, Nina

== Suriname ==
- Adel, Carolyn
- Daal, Sade
- Fung-A-Wing, Mike
- Nesty, Anthony
- Pigot, Chinyere
- Pigot, Diguan
- Touw Ngie Tjouw, Gordon

== Sweden ==
- Alshammar, Therese
- Andersson, Erik
- Andersson, Jonas
- Andersson, Robert
- Andersson, Vilhelm
- Arvidsson, Pär
- Baron, Bengt
- Berg, Aina
- Berggren, Peter
- Berglund, Eva
- Bergqvist, Erik
- Bidrman, Jan
- Borg, Åke
- Borg, Arne
- Borg, Björn
- Carlsson, Daniel
- Cederqvist, Jane
- Christiansen, Glen
- Ejdervik, Rebecca
- Eriksson, Agneta
- Eriksson, Hanna (born 1984)
- Eriksson, Hanna (born 1999)
- Ewerlund, Gurli
- Fagundez, Gabriella
- Fleur, Eric la
- Frölander, Lars
- Gingsjö, Bengt
- Granlund, Petra
- Gumpel, Max
- Gustafsson, Tina
- Gustavsson, Martin
- Gylling, Jane
- Hanson, Pontus
- Henning, Thor
- Holmertz, Anders
- Holmertz, Mikael
- Holmertz, Per
- Holmström, Annelie
- Igelström, Emma
- Isaksson, Patrik
- Jacobson, Sandra
- Johansson, Greta
- Johansson, Hjalmar
- Johansson, Per
- Jöhncke, Louise
- Julin, Harald
- Kammerling, Anna-Karin
- Karlsson, Louise
- Kumfeldt, Torsten
- Kuras, Magdalena
- Larsson, Gunnar
- Larsson, Göran
- Laurén, Mikaela
- Lejdström, Thomas
- Lillhage, Josefin
- Ljungdahl, Carina
- Lyrbring, Anders
- Machnow, Emily
- Malmrot, Håkan
- Marko-Varga, Ida
- Mårtensson, Agneta
- Milton, Richard
- Möller, Carin
- Nilsson, Carin
- Nilsson, Malin
- Nordenstam, Sara
- Nystrand, Stefan
- Ohlin, Mattias
- Örn, Mikael
- Östrand, Per-Olof
- Persson, Jonas
- Persson, Stefan
- Petersson, Jens
- Pettersson, Wivan
- Piehl, Marcus
- Renholm, Pontus
- Sjöberg, Johanna
- Sjödin, Simon
- Sjöström, Sarah
- Söderlund, Michael
- Stymne, Petter
- Svahnström, Malin
- Svendsen, Therese
- Thydén, Sara
- Tilly, Jonas
- Töpel, Hjördis
- Trolle, Orvar
- Wallin, Christer
- Wennerström, Gunnar
- Werner, Georg
- Werner, Tommy
- Westrin, Hanna
- Wikström, Christoffer
- Wikström, Per
- Zarnowiecki, Anita

== Switzerland ==
- Andermatt, Adrian
- Dagon, Étienne
- Halsall, Dano
- Rigamonti, Flavia

== Thailand ==
- Chinnapasaen, Arwut
- Junkrajang, Natthanan
- Ketin, Nuttapong
- Matjiur, Radomyos
- Minpraphal, Praphalsai
- Phuangthong, Dulyarit
- Phuvichit, Sornsawan
- Ratanachote, Vicha
- Saengsri, Charnvudth
- Sethsothorn, Torlarp
- Sethsothorn, Torwai
- Sirisanont, Ratapong
- Tachakittiranan, Pilin
- Thaveesupsoonthorn, Nimitta
- Vorathamrong, Chonlathorn
- Yimsomruay, Pathunyu

== Togo ==
- Kpegba, Eméric
- Kpossi, Adzo

== Trinidad and Tobago ==
- Andrews, Mark
- Bovell, George
- Bovell, Nicholas
- Cropper, Siobhan
- Marshall, Rachael
- McEachrane, Linda
- McLean, Sharntelle
- Paddington, Sebastien

== Tunisia ==
- Belhedi, Nejib
- Ben Naceur, Anouar
- Gharbi, Ali
- Lajnef, Sarra
- Mathlouthi, Ahmed
- Mathlouthi, Maroua
- Mellouli, Oussama
- Mrabet, Taki

== Turkey ==
- Aslanoğlu, Ömer
- Atasay, Serkan
- Atasoy, Demir
- Büyükuncu, Derya
- Diker, Ayşe
- Dikmen, İlkay
- Dolunay, Burcu
- Ergenekan, Can
- Erke, Derya
- Günaydın, Dilara Buse
- Gürdal, Kemal Arda
- Mindan, Aytekin
- Nazar, Deniz
- Oral, Orel
- Samancı, Beste
- Taner, Uğur
- Taşkın, Özlem Yasemin
- Tayla, Kaan
- Ulusoy, Devrim Cenk
- Uras, Onur
- Yıldırımer, Ediz

== Uganda ==
- Atuhaire, Joe
- Kaburu, Gilbert
- Luberenga, Edgar
- Lunkuse, Jamila
- Mugula, Ganzi
- Nakitanda, Olivia Aya
- Singhal, Supra
- Ssegwanyi, Daisuke
- Tibatemwa, Joshua
- Tusabe, Prossy

== Ukraine ==
- Bondarenko, Svitlana
- Borysyk, Ihor
- Breus, Serhiy
- Chervynskyi, Ihor
- Fesenko, Serhiy
- Hovorov, Andriy
- Khnykin, Pavlo
- Klochkova, Yana
- Lisohor, Oleh
- Nikolaychuk, Volodymyr
- Romanchuk, Mykhailo
- Salnikov, Vladimir
- Serdinov, Andriy
- Snitko, Ihor
- Sylantyev, Denys
- Volynets, Oleksandr
- Zubkova, Kateryna

== United States ==
- Adams, Cammile
- Adrian, Nathan
- Anderson, Alyssa
- Anderson, Haley
- Andrew, Michael
- Andrews, Theresa
- Babashoff, Shirley
- Bal, Randall
- Barr, Beth
- Beard, Amanda
- Beisel, Elizabeth
- Belote, Melissa
- Benko, Lindsay
- Bennett, Brooke
- Held, Ryan
- Berkoff, David
- Berube, Ryan
- Biondi, Matt
- Bootsma, Rachel
- Botsford, Beth
- Breen, George
- Bruner, Carlton
- Burckle, Clark
- Callahan, Joseph N.
- Carvin, Chad
- Caulkins, Tracy
- Cavanaugh, Chris
- Cheng, Kevin
- Clary, Tyler
- Costa, Nikka
- Coughlin, Natalie
- Crabbe, Clarence
- Cramer, Jayme
- Crippen, Fran
- Crippen, Maddy
- Crocker, Ian
- Daniels, Charles
- Davis, Josh
- Dolan, Tom
- Donahue, Claire
- Dressel, Caeleb
- Dusing, Nate
- Dwyer, Conor
- Ederle, Gertrude
- Ervin, Anthony
- Evans, Janet
- Franklin, Melissa
- Gaines, Rowdy
- Gangloff, Mark
- Genter, Steve
- Goldblatt, Scott
- Gubser, Amy Appelhans
- Hall, Gary Jr.
- Hall, Gary Sr.
- Hardy, Jessica
- Gemmell, Andrew
- Alexy, Jack
- Grevers, Matt
- Hansen, Brendan
- Hedgepeth, Whitney
- Hersey, Kathleen
- Hobson, Luke
- Hoff, Katie
- Holm, Eleanor
- Houchin, Charlie
- Howell, Dick
- Hyman, Misty
- Ivey, Mitchell
- Jackson, Trina
- Jacobs, Christopher
- Jaeger, Connor
- Jagenburg, Gregory
- Jager, Tom
- Jendrick, Megan
- Jensen, Larsen
- Johnson, Jenna
- Jones, Cullen
- Jorgensen, Janel
- Joyce, Kara Lynn
- Kahanamoku, Duke
- Karnaugh, Ron
- Keller, Klete
- Kempner, Patty
- King, Lilly
- Kinsella, John
- Kolb, Claudia
- Kostoff, Jeff
- Kowal, Kristy
- Krayzelburg, Lenny
- Kremer, Mitzi
- Kukors, Ariana
- Larson, Breeja
- Lawrence, Micah
- Ledecky, Katie
- Leverenz, Caitlin
- Lezak, Jason
- Lochte, Ryan
- Long, Jessica
- Lundquist, Steve
- Magnuson, Christine
- Marshall, Peter
- Martino, Angel
- McBreen, Tom
- McFarlane, Tracey
- McGill, Tyler
- McKinney, Frank
- McLean, Matt
- Meagher, Mary T.
- Merhige, Maya
- Meyer, Alex
- Miller, Cody
- Moe, Karen
- Montgomery, Jim
- Morales, Pablo
- Moses, Ed
- Murphy, John
- Murphy, Ryan
- Namesnik, Eric
- Neal, Lia
- Neilson, Sandra
- Nevid, Nick
- Northway, Douglas
- Olsen, Jon
- Peirsol, Aaron
- Perdue, Lauren
- Phelps, Michael
- Robie, Carl
- Rose, Gabrielle
- Rothhammer, Keena
- Ruuska, Sylvia
- Ryan, Sean
- Rooney, Maxime
- Saari, Roy
- Sandeno, Kaitlin
- Sanders, Summer
- Schollander, Don
- Schmitt, Allison
- Schumacher, Brad
- Schwenk, Tripp
- Seliskar, Andrew
- Shanteau, Eric
- Shoults, Grant
- Smith, Kieran
- Soni, Rebecca
- Spitz, Mark
- Stamm, Michael
- Sterkel, Jill
- Stitts, Staciana
- Sutton, Chloe
- Taormina, Sheila
- Tarwater, Davis
- Taylor, Stella
- Teuscher, Cristina
- Thoman, Nick
- Thompson, Chris
- Thompson, Jenny
- Torres, Dara
- Troy, Michael
- Vandenberg, Kim
- Vanderkaay, Peter
- Van Dyken, Amy
- Varona, Donna de
- Vaziri, Leila
- Vendt, Erik
- Vollmer, Dana
- Vreeland, Shannon
- Walker, Laura
- Wayte, Mary
- Weir, Amanda
- Weissmuller, Johnny
- Weltz, Scott
- Whitley, Reece
- Williams, Esther
- Ziegler, Kate

== Uruguay ==
- Gallo, Diego
- Fernández, Serrana
- Picasso, Francisco
- Scanavino, Carlos

== Venezuela ==
- Monasterio, Ricardo
- Mora, Nelson
- Sánchez, Francisco
- Vidal, Rafael

== Zimbabwe ==
- Coventry, Kirsty
