= Van Valkengoed =

Van Valkengoed is a Dutch surname. Notable people with the surname include:

- Jolijn van Valkengoed (born 1981), Dutch swimmer
- Thijs van Valkengoed (born 1983), Dutch swimmer, brother of Jolijn
- Anne van Valkengoed, Dutch environmental psychologist at the University of Groningen.
