= Joseph Callahan =

Joseph or Joe Callahan may refer to:

- Joseph M. Callahan (1885–1973), New York politician and judge
- Joseph N. Callahan, American swimmer
- Joseph R. Callahan (1892–1977), American farmer, businessman, and politician
- Joseph Callahan, actor in A La Cabaret
- Joe Callahan (ice hockey) (born 1982), American ice hockey player
- Joe Callahan (baseball) (1916–1949), American baseball pitcher
- Joe Callahan (footballer) (1898–1978), Australian rules footballer
- Joe Callahan (American football) (born 1993), American football quarterback

== See also ==
- Joe Callanan (born 1949), Irish politician
- Joe Callaghan, footballer
- Joseph Callaghan (disambiguation)
