= Legault =

Legault is a surname of French origin, most prevalent amongst French Canadians. Notable people with the surname include:

- Carl Legault (1923–83), Canadian politician
- Charles-Alexis Legault (born 2003), Canadian ice hockey player
- Claude Legault (born 1963), Canadian actor
- Diane Legault (born 1956), Canadian politician
- Émile Legault (born 2000), Canadian soccer player
- François Legault (born 1957), Canadian politician and 32nd premier of Quebec
- Hugues Legault (born 1974), Canadian freestyle swimmer
- Josée Legault (born 1966), Canadian journalist
- Karine Legault (born 1978), Canadian freestyle swimmer
- Kyle Legault (born 1985), Canadian speedway rider
- Lance LeGault (1937–2012), American actor
- Léonard Legault (1935–2017), Canadian diplomat
- Paul Legault (born 1985), Canadian-American poet
- Suzanne Legault, former Information Commissioner of Canada
- Théodore Legault (1886–1935), Canadian politician
- Thierry Legault (born 1962), French astrophotographer

== See also ==
- 19458 Legault, an asteroid
- Legault, a character from the video game Fire Emblem
