= Joseph Callaghan (disambiguation) =

Joseph Cruess Callaghan was an Irish flying ace.

Joseph Callaghan may also refer to:

- Joseph Ayden Callaghan, an English actor
- Joseph Callaghan, namesake of J. Pius Callaghan Cup
- Joe Callaghan, a New Zealand footballer

== See also ==
- Joseph Callahan (disambiguation)
