= Conrad Francis =

Sri Lankan swimmer

Personal information
- Full name: Conrad Anthony Francis
- National team: Sri Lanka
- Born: 8 August 1981 (age 45) Colombo, Sri Lanka
- Height: 1.83 m (6 ft 0 in)
- Weight: 63 kg (139 lb)

Sport
- Sport: Swimming
- Strokes: Butterfly
- Club: Nunawading Swim Club (AUS)
- Coach: Leigh Nugent (AUS)
Medal record
Men's swimming
Representing Sri Lanka
South Asian Games
Gold medal – first place	2004 Islamabad	50 m butterfly
Gold medal – first place	2004 Islamabad	100 m butterfly
Silver medal – second place	1999 Kathmandu	100 m butterfly
Silver medal – second place	2004 Islamabad	50 m breaststroke
Silver medal – second place	2004 Islamabad	100 m breaststroke
Silver medal – second place	2010 Dhaka	100 m butterfly

Conrad Anthony Francis (born 8 August 1981) is a Sri Lankan former swimmer, who specialized in butterfly events. He is a two-time Olympian (2000 and 2004), a three-time swimmer at the Commonwealth Games (2002, 2006, 2010), and a double gold medalist in the 50 and 100 m butterfly at the Asian Age Group Championships. Francis also became the first Sri Lankan to swim the same stroke under 56 seconds, when he competed at the 2004 FINA World Short Course Championships in Indianapolis, Indiana.

Francis made his first Sri Lankan team at the 2000 Summer Olympics in Sydney, where he competed in the men's 100 m butterfly. Swimming in heat one, he picked up a fifth seed and fifty-eighth overall by 0.81 of a second behind Latvia's Artūrs Jakovļevs in 57.44.

At the 2004 Summer Olympics in Athens, Francis qualified again for the 100 m butterfly, by receiving a Universality place from FINA, in an invitation time of 56.36. He challenged seven other swimmers on the second heat, including fellow two-time Olympians Daniel O'Keeffe and Nicholas Rees of the Bahamas. He raced again to fifth place by a 1.93-second margin behind winner Michal Rubáček of the Czech Republic in 56.80. Francis failed to advance into the semifinals, as he placed fifty-second overall in the preliminaries.

Francis previously resided in Melbourne, Australia, where he graduated with a bachelor's degree in sports development, management, and recreation at Swinburne University of Technology. He also competed for Nunawading Swim Club under head coach Leigh Nugent, who led his Australian swimming team at two Olympic Games before his resignation in 2013.

From July 2022 to July 2026, Francis coached students at Seoul Foreign School (SFS).

In July 2026, Francis joined Brent International School in Manila as Aquatics Director and Head Performance Coach.
