= Swimming at the 2000 Summer Olympics – Men's 100 metre butterfly =

Men's 100 metre butterfly at the Games of the XXVII Olympiad
- Venue: Sydney International Aquatic Centre
- Date: September 21, 2000 (heats & semifinals); September 22, 2000 (final)
- Competitors: 63 from 53 nations
- Winning time: 52.00 EU

Medalists
1st place, gold medalist(s)		Lars Frölander	Sweden
2nd place, silver medalist(s)		Michael Klim	Australia
3rd place, bronze medalist(s)		Geoff Huegill	Australia

The men's 100 metre butterfly event at the 2000 Summer Olympics took place on 21–22 September at the Sydney International Aquatic Centre in Sydney, Australia.

Competing at his third Games, Lars Frölander ended Sweden's 20-year drought to become an Olympic champion in the event, since Pär Arvidsson did so in 1980. Surprised by a massive home crowd, he overhauled Australia's top favorites Michael Klim and Geoff Huegill on the final 25 metres to snatch a gold medal in a new European record of 52.00. Klim added a silver to his two relay golds from the Games, in a time of 52.18, while Huegill took home the bronze in 52.22, handing an entire medal pool for the Aussies with an unexpected two–three finish.

At 18 years of age, U.S. teenage swimmer Ian Crocker came up with a spectacular swim to earn a fourth spot in an American record of 52.44. Meanwhile, Canada's Mike Mintenko shared a fifth-place tie with Japan's Takashi Yamamoto in a matching standard of 52.58. Germany's Thomas Rupprath and Russia's Anatoly Polyakov closed out the field with a joint seventh-place finish (53.13).

Earlier in the semifinals, Huegill became the second fastest of all time in swimming history to break a 52-second barrier, establishing a new Olympic record of 51.96.

== Records ==
Prior to this competition, the existing world and Olympic records were as follows.

World record	Michael Klim (AUS)	51.81	Canberra, Australia	12 December 1999
Olympic record	Denis Pankratov (RUS)	52.27	Atlanta, United States	24 July 1996

The following new world and Olympic records were set during this competition.

Date	Event	Name	Nationality	Time	Record
21 September	Semifinal 1	Geoff Huegill	Australia	51.96	OR

== Results ==
=== Heats ===
Rank	Heat	Lane	Name	Nationality	Time	Notes
1	7	4	Michael Klim	Australia	52.73	Q
2	8	4	Geoff Huegill	Australia	52.79	Q
3	8	6	Mike Mintenko	Canada	52.90	Q, NR
4	6	6	Takashi Yamamoto	Japan	52.91	Q
5	6	4	Lars Frölander	Sweden	53.14	Q
6	7	3	Zsolt Gáspár	Hungary	53.29	Q
7	6	2	Anatoly Polyakov	Russia	53.30	Q
8	7	6	Denys Sylantyev	Ukraine	53.34	Q
9	6	5	Ian Crocker	United States	53.45	Q
10	6	3	James Hickman	Great Britain	53.48	Q
11	8	3	Franck Esposito	France	53.54	Q
11	8	5	Tommy Hannan	United States	53.54	Q
13	7	5	Thomas Rupprath	Germany	53.57	Q
14	6	7	Joris Keizer	Netherlands	53.66	Q
15	7	8	Jere Hård	Finland	53.67	Q
16	5	5	Stefan Aartsen	Netherlands	53.81	Q
17	7	1	Andriy Serdinov	Ukraine	53.90	
18	5	6	Theo Verster	South Africa	53.95	
19	6	1	Igor Marchenko	Russia	53.98	
20	5	4	Ouyang Kunpeng	China	54.12	
21	7	7	Ioan Gherghel	Romania	54.13	
22	7	2	Shamek Pietucha	Canada	54.14	
23	6	8	Peter Mankoč	Slovenia	54.15	
23	8	1	Daniel Carlsson	Sweden	54.15	
25	8	8	Tero Välimaa	Finland	54.24	
26	5	2	Marcin Kaczmarek	Poland	54.32	
27	5	7	Jan Vítazka	Czech Republic	54.34	
28	5	8	Pablo Martín Abal	Argentina	54.45	
29	8	2	Francisco Sánchez	Venezuela	54.56	
30	4	4	Simão Morgado	Portugal	54.75	
31	4	2	Philippe Meyer	Switzerland	54.85	NR
32	4	6	Andrew Livingston	Puerto Rico	55.03	
33	5	1	Joshua Ilika Brenner	Mexico	55.07	
34	3	4	Ravil Nachaev	Uzbekistan	55.21	
35	3	5	Konstantin Ushkov	Kyrgyzstan	55.25	
36	1	5	Anthony Ang	Malaysia	55.26	NR
37	4	7	Yoav Meiri	Israel	55.38	
38	3	7	Simeon Makedonski	Bulgaria	55.49	
39	2	4	Janko Gojković	Bosnia and Herzegovina	55.55	NR
39	5	3	Oswaldo Quevedo	Venezuela	55.55	
41	2	3	Aleksandar Miladinovski	Macedonia	55.62	
42	4	1	Dennis Otzen Jensen	Denmark	55.70	
43	4	3	Yohan García	Cuba	55.74	
44	2	6	Mehdi Addadi	Algeria	56.04	
45	2	7	Daniel O'Keeffe	Guam	56.05	NR
46	2	8	Roberto Delgado	Ecuador	56.07	
47	3	6	Luc Decker	Luxembourg	56.10	
48	2	5	Ríkardur Ríkardsson	Iceland	56.11	NR
49	1	4	Andrey Gavrilov	Kazakhstan	56.14	
50	4	8	Ivan Mladina	Croatia	56.17	
51	1	3	Ioannis Drymonakos	Greece	56.36	
52	3	2	Tseng Cheng-hua	Chinese Taipei	56.39	
53	3	3	Haitham Hassan	Egypt	56.42	
54	2	2	Stephen Fahy	Bermuda	56.46	
55	3	8	Albert Christiadi Sutanto	Indonesia	56.50	
56	1	6	Artūrs Jakovļevs	Latvia	56.63	
57	2	1	Nicholas Rees	Bahamas	57.23	
58	1	2	Conrad Francis	Sri Lanka	57.44	
59	3	1	Dumitru Zastoico	Moldova	58.55	
60	1	1	Kim Jin-woo	Kenya	59.55	
61	1	7	Kamal Salman Masud	Pakistan	1:00.60	
	4	5	Milorad Čavić	FR Yugoslavia	DSQ	
	8	7	Christian Keller	Germany	DNS	

=== Semifinals ===
==== Semifinal 1 ====
Rank	Lane	Name	Nationality	Time	Notes
1	4	Geoff Huegill	Australia	51.96	Q, OR
2	5	Takashi Yamamoto	Japan	53.10	Q
3	1	Joris Keizer	Netherlands	53.33	NR
4	3	Zsolt Gáspár	Hungary	53.45	
5	6	Denys Sylantyev	Ukraine	53.51	
6	2	James Hickman	Great Britain	53.55	
7	7	Tommy Hannan	United States	53.59	
8	8	Stefan Aartsen	Netherlands	53.81	

==== Semifinal 2 ====
Rank	Lane	Name	Nationality	Time	Notes
1	4	Michael Klim	Australia	52.63	Q
2	2	Ian Crocker	United States	52.82	Q
3	3	Lars Frölander	Sweden	52.84	Q
4	5	Mike Mintenko	Canada	53.00	Q
5	1	Thomas Rupprath	Germany	53.18	Q
6	6	Anatoly Polyakov	Russia	53.32	Q
7	7	Franck Esposito	France	53.38	
8	8	Jere Hård	Finland	53.65	

=== Final ===
Rank	Lane	Name	Nationality	Time	Notes
1st place, gold medalist(s)	6	Lars Frölander	Sweden	52.00	EU
2nd place, silver medalist(s)	5	Michael Klim	Australia	52.18	
3rd place, bronze medalist(s)	4	Geoff Huegill	Australia	52.22	
4	3	Ian Crocker	United States	52.44	AM
5	2	Mike Mintenko	Canada	52.58	NR
5	7	Takashi Yamamoto	Japan	52.58	AS
7	1	Thomas Rupprath	Germany	53.13	
7	8	Anatoly Polyakov	Russia	53.13	
