= Ríkarður Ríkarðsson =

Icelandic swimmer

Personal information
- Full name: Ríkarður Ríkarðsson
- National team: Iceland
- Born: 2 November 1977 (age 48) Reykjavík, Iceland
- Height: 1.86 m (6 ft 1 in)
- Weight: 83 kg (183 lb)

Sport
- Sport: Swimming
- Strokes: Freestyle, butterfly

Ríkarður Ríkarðsson (born November 2, 1977) is an Icelandic former swimmer, who specialized in sprint freestyle and butterfly events. Rikardsson competed only in two individual events at the 2000 Summer Olympics in Sydney. He achieved FINA B-standards of 56.22 (100 m butterfly) from the U.S. National Championships in Federal Way, Washington, and 52.42 (100 m freestyle) from the European Championships in Helsinki, Finland. In the 100 m freestyle, Rikardsson placed fifty-eighth on the morning prelims. Swimming in heat three, he picked up a fourth seed by 0.63 of a second behind winner Paul Kutscher of Uruguay in 52.85. Two days later, in the 100 m butterfly, Rikardsson challenged seven other swimmers in heat two, including Guam's 28-year-old Daniel O'Keeffe and Bosnia's three-time Olympian Janko Gojković. He blasted a new Icelandic record of 56.11 to take a sixth spot and forty-eighth overall, finishing behind winner Gojkovic by almost two-thirds of a second (0.66).
