= Werner Plath =

German swimmer

Personal information
- Born: July 27, 1918 Berlin, Germany
- Died: 1945 (aged 26–27)

Sport
- Sport: Swimming
Medal record
Representing Germany
European Championships (LC)
Gold medal – first place	1938 London	4×200 m freestyle
Silver medal – second place	1938 London	400 m freestyle

Werner Plath (27 July 1918 – 1945) was a German swimmer who competed in the 1936 Summer Olympics. He was born in Berlin. He was executed during World War II.
