= 1938 European Aquatics Championships =

Water sport competitions

5th European Aquatics Championships
- Host city: London
- Country: United Kingdom
- Events: 16
- Opening: 6 August 1938
- Closing: 13 August 1938

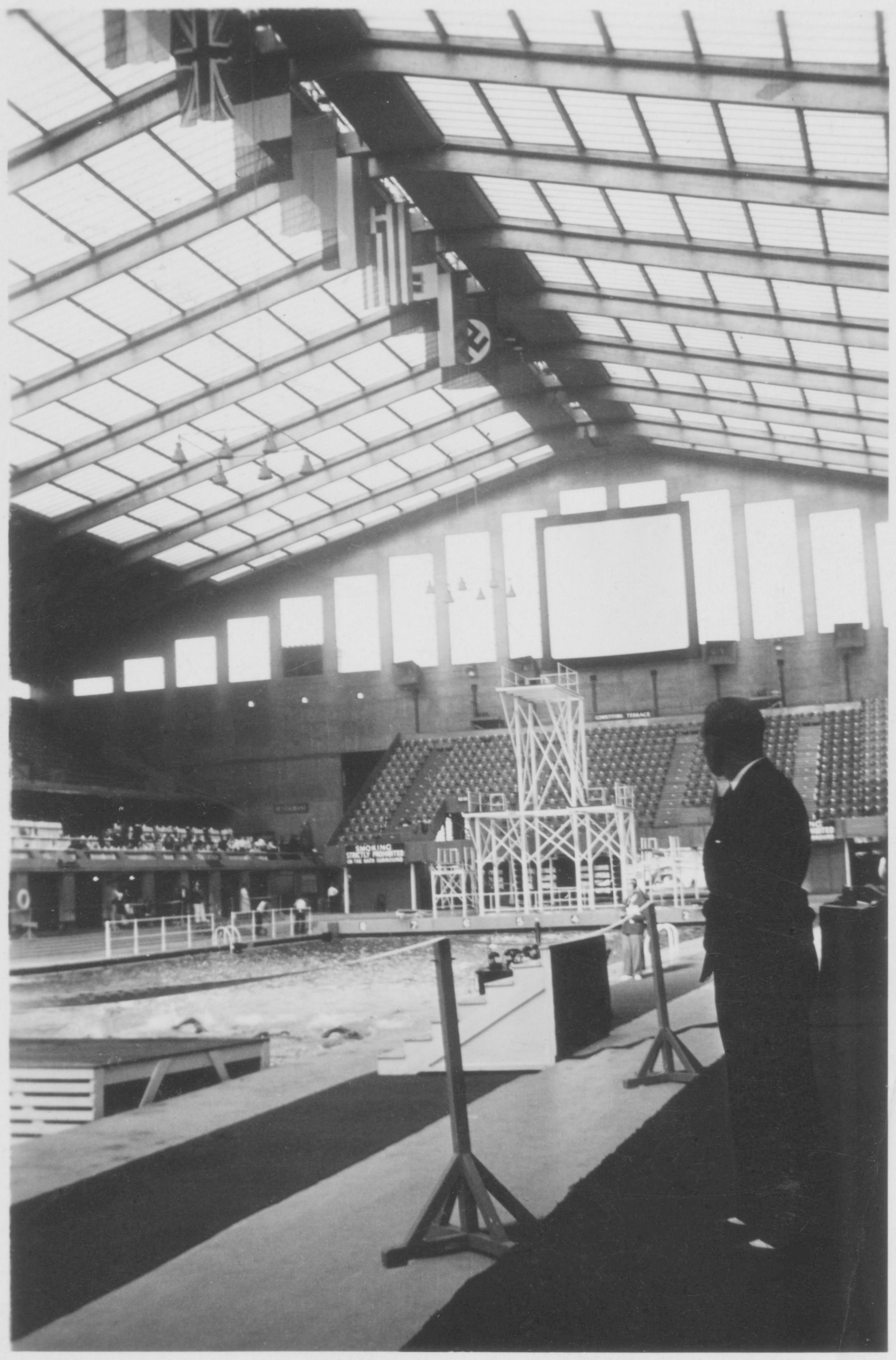
Empire Pool Wembley on the first day of the 1938 European Aquatics Championships. London, 6 August 1938.

The 1938 LEN European Aquatics Championships were held 6–13 August 1938 in London, United Kingdom.

== Medal table ==
* Host nation (Great Britain)

Rank	Nation	Gold	Silver	Bronze	Total
1	Germany	5	7	2	14
2	Denmark	5	1	1	7
3	Netherlands	2	3	4	9
4	Sweden	2	1	0	3
5	Great Britain*	1	3	5	9
6	Hungary	1	0	3	4
7	France	0	1	0	1
8	Belgium	0	0	1	1
8	Yugoslavia	0	0	1	1
Totals (9 entries)		16	16	17	49

== Medal summary ==
=== Diving ===
Men's events

Event	Gold		Silver		Bronze	
3 m springboard	Erhard Weiß; Germany	148.02	Fritz Haster; Germany	137.50	Frederick Hodges; Great Britain	132.52
10 m highboard	Erhard Weiß; Germany	124.67	Hans Kitzig; Germany	121.53	László Hidvégi; Hungary	107.22

Women's events

Event	Gold		Silver		Bronze	
3 m springboard	Betty Slade; Great Britain	103.60	Gerda Daumerlang; Germany	102.28	Edna Child; Great Britain	100.40
10 m highboard	Inge Beeken; Denmark	37.09	Ann-Margret Nirling; Sweden	36.92	Suse Heinze; Germany	36.39

=== Swimming ===
Men's events

Event	Gold		Silver		Bronze	
100 m freestyle	Kees Hoving; Netherlands	59.8	Frederick Dove; Great Britain	1:00.6	István Kőrösi; Hungary	1:01.2
400 m freestyle	Björn Borg; Sweden	4:51.6	Werner Plath; Germany	4:56.2	Norman Wainwright; Great Britain	4:56.3
1500 m freestyle	Björn Borg; Sweden	19:55.6	Bob Leivers; Great Britain	19:57.0	Heinz Arendt; Germany	20:12.6
100 m backstroke	Heinz Schlauch; Germany	1:09.0	Gerhard Nüsske; Germany	1:10.8	Árpád Lengyel; Hungary; Stans Scheffer; NED	1:12.0
200 m breaststroke	Joachim Balke; Germany	2:45.8	Erwin Sietas; Germany	2:45.9	Anton Cerer; Yugoslavia	2:47.6
4 × 200 m freestyle relay	Germany; Werner Birr; Wolfgang Heimlich; Hans Freese; Werner Plath	9:17.6	France; Roland Pallard; Christian Talli; René Cavalero; Alfred Nakache	9:22.6	Great Britain; Frederick Dove; Kenneth Deane; Bob Leivers; Norman Wainwright	9:24.6

Women's events

Event	Gold		Silver		Bronze	
100 m freestyle	Ragnhild Hveger; Denmark	1:06.2	Birte Ove-Petersen; Denmark	1:06.8	Rie van Veen; Netherlands	1:08.4
400 m freestyle	Ragnhild Hveger; Denmark	5:09.0	Rie van Veen; Netherlands	5:27.7	Fernande Caroen; Belgium	5:33.4
100 m backstroke	Cor Kint; Netherlands	1:15.0	Iet van Feggelen; Netherlands	1:15.9	Birte Ove-Petersen; Denmark	1:17.0
200 m breaststroke	Inge Sørensen; Denmark	3:05.4	Doris Storey; Great Britain	3:06.0	Jopie Waalberg; Netherlands	3:06.2
4 × 100 m freestyle relay	Denmark; Eva Arndt Riise; Gunvor Kraft; Birte Ove-Petersen; Ragnhild Hveger	4:31.6	Netherlands; Alie Stijl; Trude Malcorps; Rie van Veen; Willy den Ouden	4:39.5	Great Britain; Zilpha Grant; Joyce Harrowby; Margery Hinton; Olive Wadham	4:51.4

=== Water polo ===
Event	Gold	Silver	Bronze
Men's tournament	Hungary	Germany	Netherlands

== See also ==
- List of European Championships records in swimming
