= Saskia de Jonge =

Dutch swimmer

Personal information
- Full name: Saskia de Jonge
- Nationality: Netherlands
- Born: 22 November 1986 (age 39) Scheerwolde, Netherlands
- Height: 1.76 m (5 ft 9 in)
- Weight: 63 kg (139 lb)

Sport
- Sport: Swimming
- Strokes: freestyle
- Club: Nationaal Zweminstituut Amsterdam
Medal record
Women's swimming
Representing Netherlands
European Championships (SC)
Gold medal – first place	2009 Istanbul	4×50 m freestyle
Silver medal – second place	2006 Helsinki	4×50 m freestyle

Saskia de Jonge (born 22 November 1986) is a Dutch swimmer who specializes in freestyle distances of up to 200 m and is part of the Dutch national team.

== Swimming career ==
De Jonge made her international debut in Helsinki at the European Short Course Swimming Championships 2006. She won a silver medal in the 4×50 m freestyle relay alongside Inge Dekker, Chantal Groot and Marleen Veldhuis. Individually, she ended up 22nd in the 50 m freestyle and 18th in the 100 m freestyle. At the European Short Course Swimming Championships 2007 in Debrecen, she only swam in the heats of both relays.

=== 2008 ===
In March 2008, representing her country at the 2008 European Aquatics Championships in Eindhoven, she swam time-trials for the 2008 Summer Olympics. De Jonge qualified for the 4 × 100 m and 4 × 200 m freestyle relay. One month later she took part in the 2008 FINA Short Course World Championships in Manchester, United Kingdom, where she swam in the heats of the 4×100 m freestyle relay in which she became world champion, although later on she was replaced for the final. She also started in the heats of the 4 × 100 m medley relay and helped the Dutch to achieve the final spot. In this final she was replaced and did not swim, but her teammates finished fourth. Individually she started in the 200 m freestyle and ended up 18th.

=== 2008 Summer Olympics ===
De Jonge was selected for the 2008 Summer Olympics in Beijing in which she formed a team with swimmers Inge Dekker, Chantal Groot, Femke Heemskerk, Linda Bank, Ranomi Kromowidjojo, Manon van Rooijen, Hinkelien Schreuder, Jolijn van Valkengoed and Marleen Veldhuis. She did not qualify for an individual event, but was eligible to swim for the team in the three relay events (4 × 100 m freestyle, 4 × 200 m freestyle, 4 × 100 m medley). She was not chosen to swim in the 4 × 100 m freestyle, but did swim in the series for the 4 × 200 m freestyle, finishing fifth and being eliminated. She saw her teammates win the gold medal at the 4 × 100 m freestyle.

== Personal bests ==
Short course
Event	Time	Date	Location
50 m freestyle	24.91	2008-12-19	Amsterdam, Netherlands
100 m freestyle	53.77	2008-12-21	Amsterdam, Netherlands
200 m freestyle	1:56.24	2008-12-20	Amsterdam, Netherlands

Long course
Event	Time	Date	Location
50 m freestyle	25.64	2007-12-08	Eindhoven, Netherlands
100 m freestyle	55.28	2008-03-19	Eindhoven, Netherlands
200 m freestyle	2:01.12	2008-03-22	Eindhoven, Netherlands
