= Birte Ove-Petersen =

Danish swimmer

Medal record
Women's swimming
Representing Denmark
European Championships
Gold medal – first place	1938 London	4×100 m freestyle
Silver medal – second place	1938 London	100 m freestyle
Bronze medal – third place	1938 London	100 m backstroke

Birte Ove-Petersen was a Danish swimmer who won three medals at the 1938 European Aquatics Championships. She was part of the Danish team that won the 4×100 m freestyle relay, setting a new world record and breaking their own world record of the same year.
