= Alan Thompson (swimming coach) =

Australian sports coach

Alan Thompson is a former Australian swimming coach, who was once the head coach of the Australian swimming team. He was appointed to the role in January 2005 following the resignation of Leigh Nugent after the 2004 Athens Olympics. He took a redundancy package from Swimming Australia in January 2010 and Nugent was re-appointed to the role. Thompson was also a school teacher at his former high school, Sir Joseph Banks High School.

Thomson was an official Olympic Swimming Team coach for the 2004 (Athens) and 2008 (Beijing) Olympics.

== History ==
Thompson ran his own swim school (Alan Thompson's Swim School), at the Campbelltown Swimming Centre in south/western Sydney from 1987 to 2004. During this period he was also the head coach of the Whitlam Swim Team from 1995 to 2004 and elite training centre coach at the New South Wales Institute of Sport from 2001 until 2004.

=== Coach/Manager positions held ===
Thompson has served as coach or manager at local, State and International levels. Apart from Olympic competitions he has worked at:

- Commonwealth Games 2002 Manchester
- Commonwealth Games 2006 Melbourne
- Pan Pacific Swimming Championships 2002 Yokohama
- Pan Pacific Swimming Championships 2006 Vancouver (Head coach)
- World Championships 2001 Fukuoka
- World Championships 2003 Barcelona
- World Championships 2005 Montreal (Head coach)
- World Championships 2007 Melbourne (Head coach)
- World Championships 2009 Rome (Head coach)
- Short Course Worlds: 2006 (Head coach), 2004, 2002, 2000(Manager), 1995(Manager)
- Open Water World Championships : 2004 (Head coach)

=== Office positions held ===
He has also served as a committee member or office holder of many state, National and International swimming organisations.

- FINA (Fédération Internationale de Natation) Coaches Commission, Honorary Secretary (2000–05, 2005–09)
- World Swimming Coaches Association - Board member (1994- )
- World Swimming Coaches Association - President (1998–2001)
- Swimming Australia High Performance Committee (2000- )
- Australian Swimming Coaches and Teachers Association - Board member (1987–2004)

== Awards ==
Thompson has received several awards in recognition of his work.

- 1999 Australian Swimming Open Water Coach of the Year
- 2001 Commemorative Ring (#54) - Australian Swimming Coaches and Teachers Association
- 2002 ASCTA Open Water Coach of the Year
- 2003 ASCTA & Australian Swimming Open Water Coach of the Year

== Qualifications ==
Australian Gold Licence / Level 3, National coaching Accreditation Scheme

== Complaint and investigation by Swimming Australia ==
In early December 2009, Thompson took personal leave following a claim of "inappropriate behaviour". Swimming Australia (SA) chief executive Kevin Neil said an "anonymous and unsubstantiated" claim of inappropriate behaviour had been brought to the national body's attention regarding Thompson, and that the allegation did not involve a claim of assault and was not a criminal matter. An independent investigation found that "there was no evidence found to support the allegation of inappropriate behaviour made against Mr Thompson".

== Rugby league ==
Thompson, a long-time supporter of the Canterbury-Bankstown Bulldogs rugby league club, was appointed general manager of its football operations on 15 April 2010.
