= Linda Bank =

Dutch swimmer (born 1986)

Personal information
- Nationality: Netherlands
- Born: 24 January 1986 (age 40) Haarlem, Netherlands

Sport
- Sport: Swimming

Linda Bank (born 24 January 1986 in Haarlem) is a Dutch Olympic swimmer.

Bank mainly focuses on the freestyle distances and is part of the Dutch national team that swims races at the larger international tournaments. In 2007, she took part in the World Championships in Melbourne where she was eliminated in the heats at the 200m freestyle. However, in the 4 × 200m freestyle relay she and her teammates reached the final in which they finished in 8th position. At the 2008 European Championships in Eindhoven she also took part in the 4 × 200m freestyle relay, swimming in the heats and helping the Dutch to achieve the final spot. In this final she was replaced, but her teammates finished fourth.

Bank qualified for the 2008 Summer Olympics in Beijing and was part of the Dutch swimming team with swimmers like Inge Dekker, Chantal Groot, Femke Heemskerk, Saskia de Jonge, Ranomi Kromowidjojo, Manon van Rooijen, Hinkelien Schreuder, Jolijn van Valkengoed and Marleen Veldhuis. She did not qualify for an individual event and did not swim in a relay either. She was not chosen to swim in the freestyle relays and saw her teammates win the gold medal in the 4 × 100m freestyle.
