= Kim Jin-woo (swimmer) =

Kenyan swimmer (born 1983)

Personal information
- Full name: Kim Jin-woo
- National team: Kenya
- Born: 17 February 1983 (age 43) Mombasa, Kenya
- Height: 1.75 m (5 ft 9 in)
- Weight: 73 kg (161 lb)

Sport
- Sport: Swimming
- Strokes: Butterfly
- Club: Mombasa Aquatics Club

Kim Jin-woo (Korean: 김진우; born February 17, 1983) is a retired Kenyan swimmer of Korean descent, who specialized in butterfly events. Born and raised by Korean immigrants, Kim became one of the first Kenyans to compete in Olympic swimming after 44 years. He also held a national record (2.42.18) in the 200 m individual medley from an age group meet in 1998, until it was broken by teenager Tory Pragassa twelve years later.

Kim qualified only for the men's 100 m butterfly at the 2000 Summer Olympics in Sydney, by receiving a Universality place from FINA, in an entry time of 1:00.52. He challenged six other swimmers in heat one, including Malaysia's top favorite Anthony Ang, and Latvia's three-time Olympian Artūrs Jakovļevs. He posted a Kenyan record of 59.55 to overhaul a one-minute barrier and save a sixth spot over Pakistan's Kamal Salman Masud. Kim failed to advance into the semifinals, as he placed sixtieth overall in the prelims.
