= Erhard Weiß =

German diver

Personal information
- Born: May 26, 1914
- Died: July 7, 1957 (aged 43)

Sport
- Sport: Diving
Medal record
Representing Germany
European Championships
Gold medal – first place	1938 London	3m springboard
Gold medal – first place	1938 London	10m platform

Erhard Weiß (May 26, 1914 – July 7, 1957) was a German diver who competed in the 1936 Summer Olympics. In 1936, he finished fourth in the 10 metre platform event and fifth in the 3 metre springboard competition. Two years later, at the 1938 European Aquatics Championships, he won gold in both of these events.
