= Minvydas Packevičius =

Lithuanian swimmer (born 1979)

Personal information
- Full name: Minvydas Packevičius
- National team: Lithuania
- Born: 3 May 1979 (age 47) Vilnius, Lithuanian SSR, Soviet Union
- Height: 1.93 m (6 ft 4 in)
- Weight: 80 kg (176 lb)

Sport
- Sport: Swimming
- Strokes: Freestyle

Minvydas Packevičius (born May 3, 1979) is a Lithuanian former swimmer, who specialized in sprint freestyle events. Packevicius competed for Lithuania in the 4×100 m freestyle relay at the 2000 Summer Olympics in Sydney. Teaming with Arūnas Savickas, Saulius Binevičius, and Rolandas Gimbutis in heat two, Packevicius swam the second leg and recorded a split of 50.53, but the Lithuanians settled only for sixth place and sixteenth overall in a final time of 3:23.68.
