= Dennis Rijnbeek =

Dutch swimmer (born 1972)

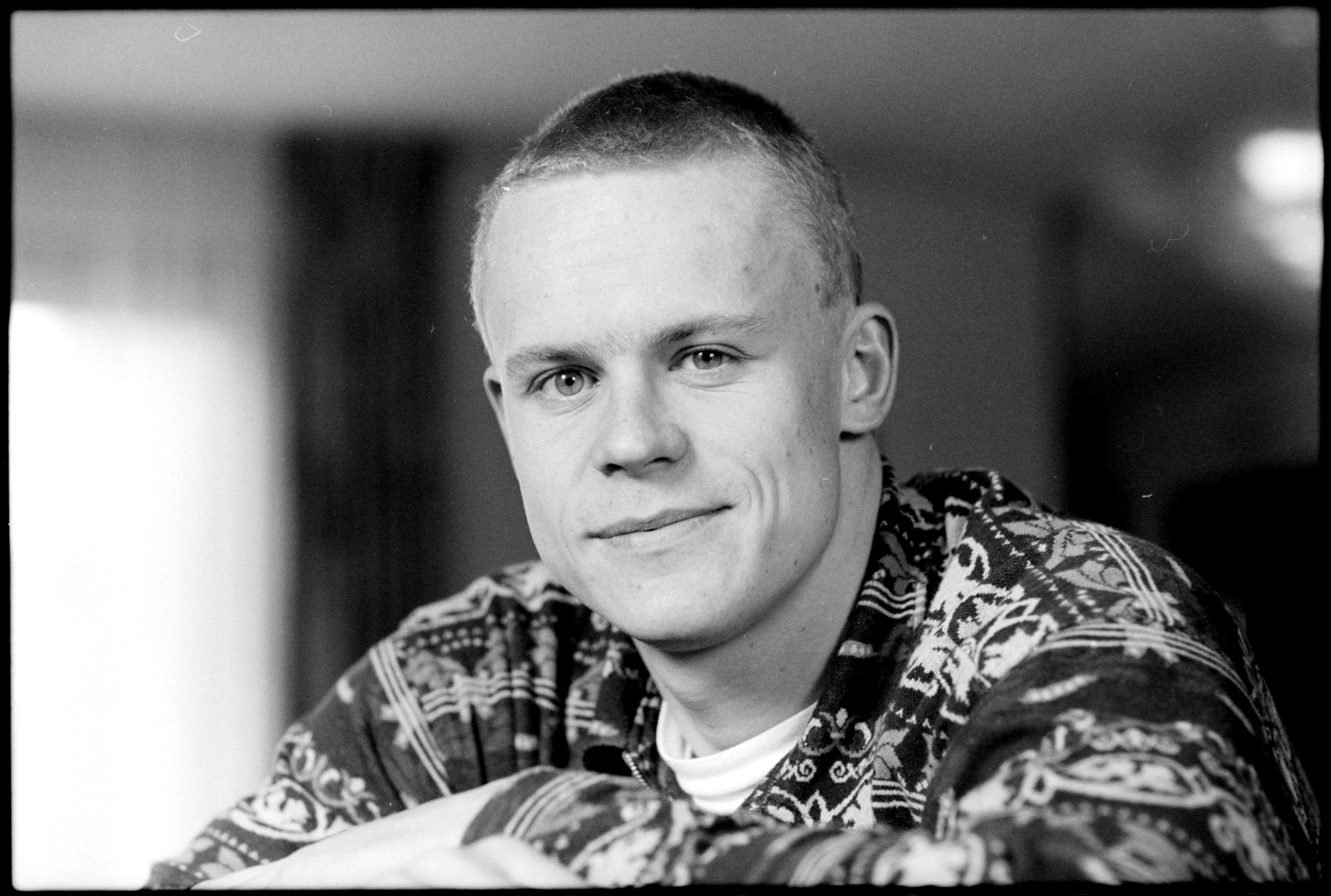
- Rijnbeek in 1996

Personal information
- Born: Dennis Martinus Hendrikus Rijnbeek; August 7, 1972 (age 53) Haarlem, Netherlands

Sport
- Sport: Swimming

Dennis Martinus Hendrikus Rijnbeek (born August 7, 1972) is a former freestyle swimmer from the Netherlands, who competed for his native country at the 2000 Summer Olympics in Sydney, Australia. There he took over too early in the qualifying heats of the 4 × 100 m freestyle relay, which meant disqualification for the Dutch relay team. He retired from the sport in 2001.
