= Ronald Woutering =

Dutch swimmer

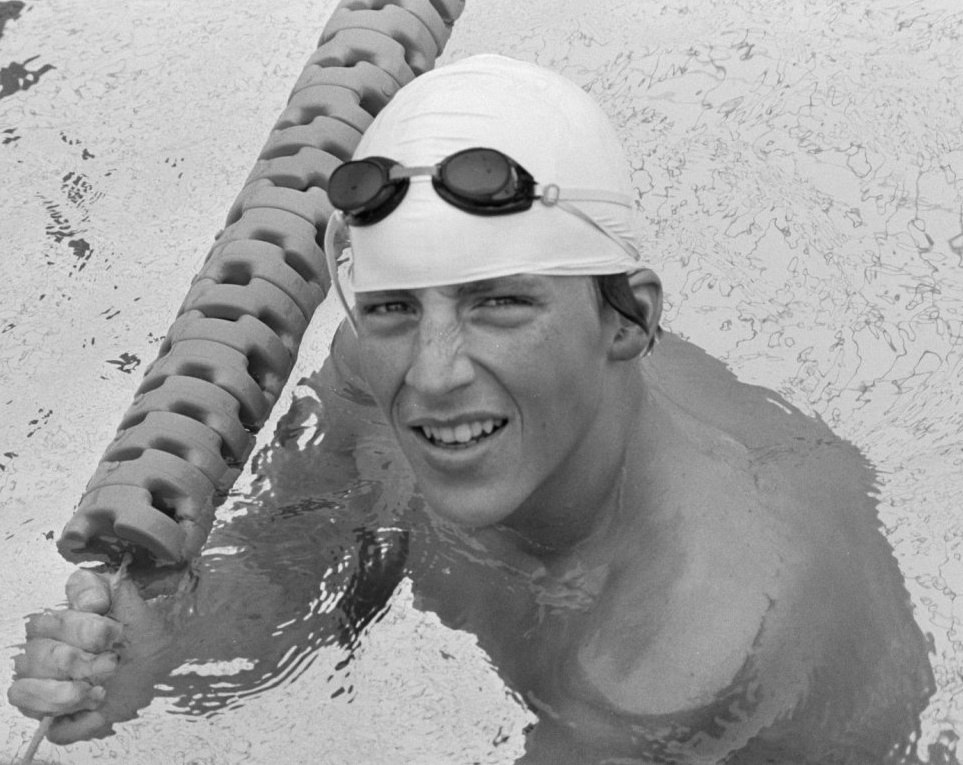
- Ronald Woutering in 1974

Personal information
- Born: 24 April 1959 (age 67) Rotterdam, Netherlands

Sport
- Sport: Swimming
- Club: Zeemacht, Den Helder

Ronald Woutering (born 24 April 1959) is a retired Dutch swimmer. He competed at the 1976 Summer Olympics in the 200 m butterfly and 400 m individual medley events, but failed to reach the finals.
