= Rie van Veen =

Dutch swimmer

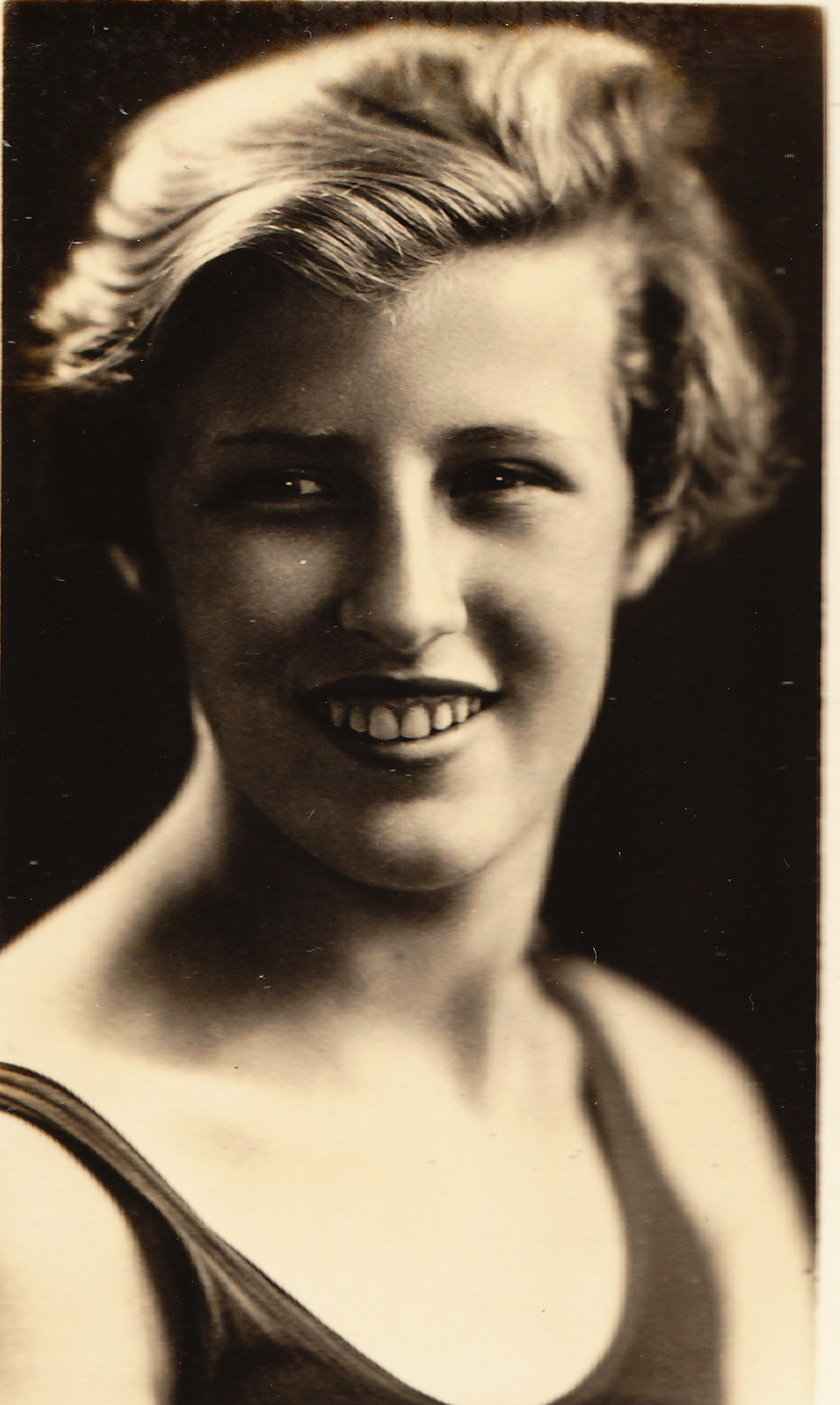
- Rie van Veen in 1938

Personal information
- Born: February 11, 1923 Rotterdam, Netherlands
- Died: 1995 (aged 71–72)

Sport
- Sport: Swimming
Medal record
Representing Netherlands
European Championships
Silver medal – second place	1938 London	4×100 m freestyle
Silver medal – second place	1938 London	400 m freestyle
Bronze medal – third place	1938 London	100 m freestyle

Maria "Rie" van Veen (also Ria, Rietje) (11 February 1923 – 1995) was a Dutch swimmer who won three medals at the 1938 European Aquatics Championships. Earlier on 26 February 1938 she set a new world record in the 200 m freestyle. Between 1938 and 1942 she won all national titles in the 100 m and 400 m freestyle events; she also won the 100 m in 1937. She married Adrianus "Arie" Thuis, a swimming coach from Haarlem, on 27 May 1943 and retired shortly thereafter.

== See also ==
- World record progression 200 metres freestyle

Records
Preceded by Willy den Ouden	Women's 200 metres freestyle world record holder (long course); 26 February 1938 – 11 September 1938	Succeeded by Ragnhild Hveger
