= Jopie Troost =

Dutch swimmer (born 1942)

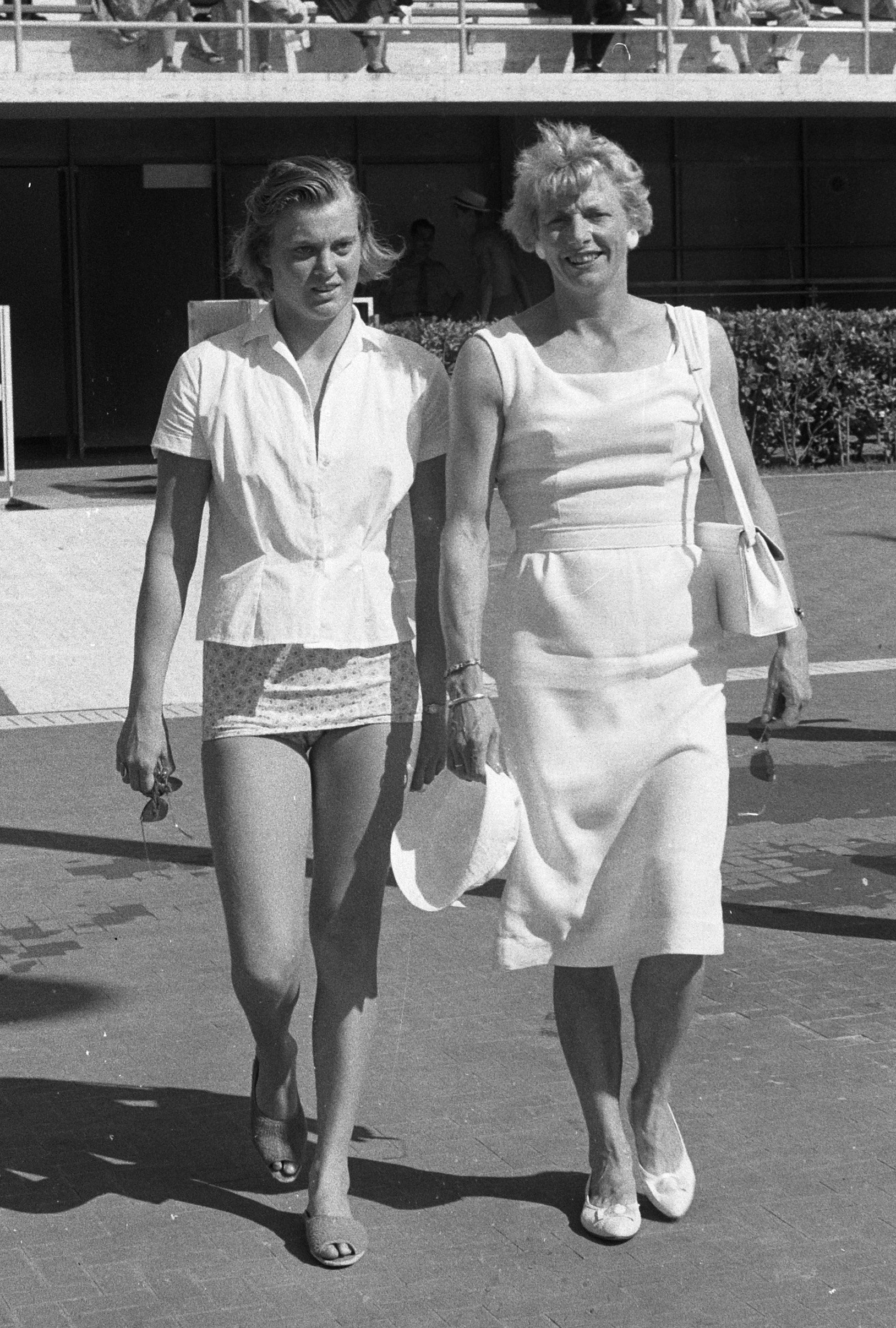
- Jopie Troost (left) and Fanny Blankers-Koen at the 1960 Olympics

Personal information
- Born: 19 September 1942 (age 83) Amsterdam, the Netherlands
- Height: 1.75 m (5 ft 9 in)
- Weight: 70 kg (150 lb)

Sport
- Sport: Swimming
- Club: HDZ, Amsterdam

Josephina Johanna "Jopie" Troost (born 19 September 1942) is a retired Dutch swimmer who competed at the 1960 Summer Olympics in the 4 × 100 m freestyle relay. A medal favorite, the Dutch team was disqualified in the heats for a premature start by Sieta Posthumus. Troost was part of 4 × 100 m freestyle relay teams that set three national records in 1958.
