= Stans Scheffer =

Dutch swimmer (1914–1982)

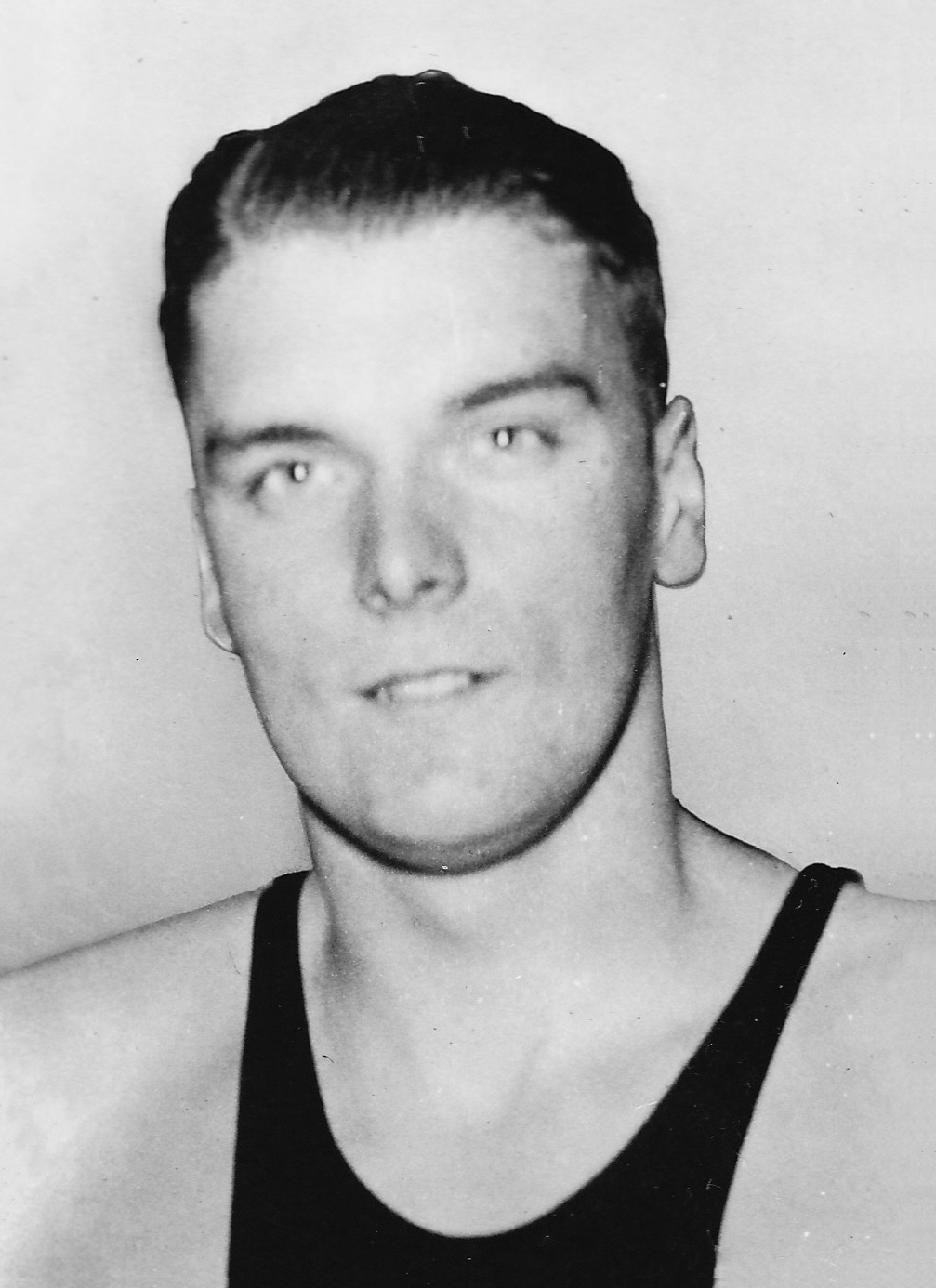
- Stans Scheffer c. 1938

Personal information
- Born: 16 December 1914 Amsterdam, the Netherlands
- Died: 12 December 1982 (aged 67) Amsterdam, the Netherlands

Sport
- Sport: Swimming
- Club: De Jonge Kampioen, Amsterdam
Medal record
Representing the Netherlands
European Championships
Bronze medal – third place	1938 London	100 m backstroke

Johannes Constantijn "Stans" Scheffer (16 December 1914 – 12 December 1982) was a Dutch swimmer. He won a bronze medal in the 100 m backstroke event at the 1938 European Aquatics Championships, and finished seventh in the 100 m freestyle in 1934. Between 1933 and 1938 he held three national titles and 12 national records in the 100 m freestyle and 100 m and 200 m backstroke events.

Scheffer competed in the 100 m backstroke at the 1936 Summer Olympics, but failed to reach the final. On 25 January 1940 he married Nida Senff, who won the gold medal in the same event at the same Olympics. They had a son born in 1942, and earlier in 1938 published a book Wij zwemmen voor ons plezier (We swim for pleasure).
