= Maritzka van der Linden =

Dutch swimmer (born 1962)

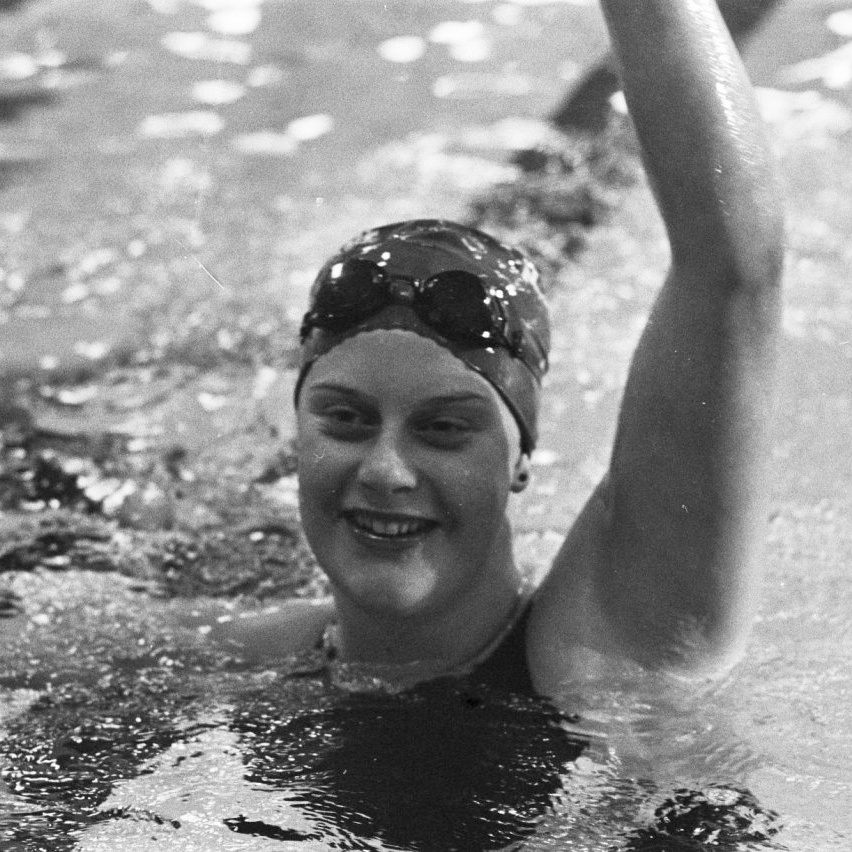
- Maritzka van der Linden in 1978

Personal information
- Born: 17 March 1962 (age 64) Rotterdam, Netherlands
- Height: 1.70 m (5 ft 7 in)
- Weight: 56 kg (123 lb)

Sport
- Sport: Swimming
- Club: RZ, Rotterdam

Helena Maria "Maritzka" van der Linden (born 17 March 1962) is a retired Dutch swimmer. She competed in the 100 m breaststroke event at the 1976 Summer Olympics, but failed to reach the finals.
