= Jo Stroomberg =

Dutch swimmer (1919–1984)

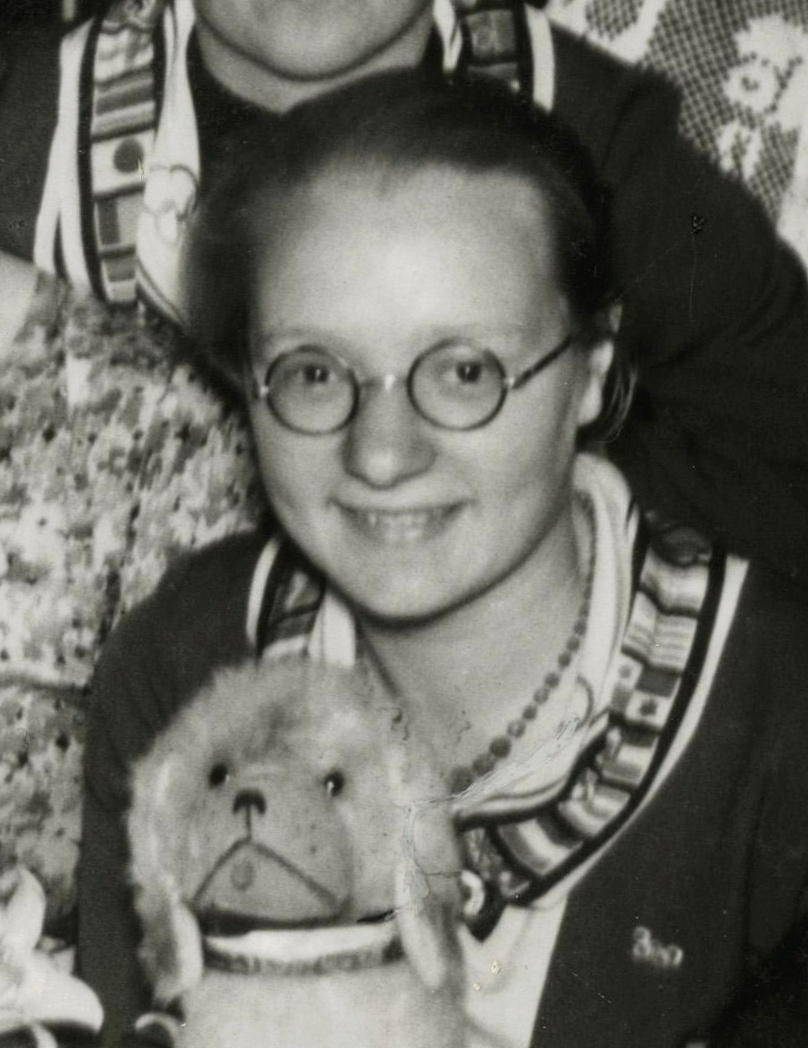
- Stroomberg in 1936

Personal information
- Born: May 19, 1919 Amsterdam, Netherlands
- Died: May 23, 1984 (aged 65) Amsterdam, Netherlands

Sport
- Sport: Swimming
- Strokes: Breaststroke

Johanna Margaretha Stroomberg (19 May 1919 – 23 May 1984) was a Dutch swimmer who participated in the 1936 Summer Olympics in the 200 m breaststroke event.
