= Nicholas Rees =

Bahamian swimmer (born 1982)

Personal information
- Full name: Nicholas Rees
- National team: Bahamas
- Born: 17 March 1982 (age 44) Nassau, Bahamas
- Height: 1.85 m (6 ft 1 in)
- Weight: 82 kg (181 lb)

Sport
- Sport: Swimming
- Strokes: Butterfly
- Club: Barracuda Swim Club
- College team: Ohio State University (U.S.)
- Coach: Bill Wadley (U.S.)

Nicholas Rees (born February 17, 1982) is a Bahamian former swimmer, who specialized in butterfly events. He is a two-time Olympian (2000 and 2004), a former Caribbean and Bahamian record holder in the 100 m butterfly, a varsity swimmer for the Ohio State Buckeyes, and a graduate of business administration at Ohio State University. Rees later obtained an MBA in International Business from the University of Miami. Nicholas Rees is also the grandson of Lionel Wilmot Brabazon Rees, VC, British war hero, Victoria Cross recipient and advisor to the Crown.

Rees made his first Bahamian team, as an eighteen-year-old junior, at the 2000 Summer Olympics in Sydney, where he competed in the men's 100 m butterfly. Swimming in heat two, and struggling with a crippling shoulder injury, he rounded out a field of eight swimmers to fifty-seventh overall by 0.77 of a second behind Bermuda's Stephen Fahy in 57.23.

At the 2004 Summer Olympics in Athens, Rees qualified again for the 100 m butterfly, by clearing a FINA B-standard entry time of 55.89 from the World Championships in Barcelona, Spain. He challenged seven other swimmers on the second heat, including fellow two-time Olympians Conrad Francis of Sri Lanka, and Daniel O'Keeffe of Guam. He raced to a third spot by a 1.52-second margin behind winner Michal Rubáček of the Czech Republic in 56.39. Rees failed to advance into the semifinals, as he placed fiftieth overall in the preliminaries.
