= Edvaldo Valério =

Brazilian swimmer (born 1978)

Personal information
- Full name: Edvaldo Valério Silva Filho
- Nicknames: Valério Bala, Salsicha
- Born: April 20, 1978 (age 48) Salvador, Bahia, Brazil
- Height: 1.94 m (6 ft 4 in)
- Weight: 78 kg (172 lb)

Sport
- Sport: Swimming
- Strokes: Freestyle
Medal record
Men's swimming
Representing Brazil
Olympic Games
Bronze medal – third place	2000 Sydney	4×100 m freestyle

Edvaldo Valério Silva Filho (born April 20, 1978, in Salvador, Bahia) is a freestyle swimmer from Brazil. He competed for his native country at the 2000 Summer Olympics in Sydney, Australia. There, he was a member of the men's relay team that won the bronze medal in the 4×100-metre freestyle in Sydney, Australia, alongside Fernando Scherer, Gustavo Borges, and Carlos Jayme.

He began his career in the pools of Salvador, where remained for many years. He was several times Brazilian champion in 50-metre, 100-metre and 200-metre freestyle.

He went through various clubs, which highlight the Costa Verde Tênis Clube, the Vasco da Gama, the Grêmio Náutico União and the Minas Tênis Clube. Also joined by several years the Brazilian national team, disputing competitions in several locals in the world.

Valério was at the 1998 World Aquatics Championships, in Perth, where he finished 6th in the 4×100-metre freestyle.

He was a reserve the 4×100-metre freestyle in 1999 Pan American Games in Winnipeg.

At the 2000 FINA World Swimming Championships (25 m), in Athens, he finished 29th in the 50-metre freestyle, 32nd in the 100-metre freestyle, 23rd in the 200-metre freestyle, and was in the 4×200-metre freestyle final, finishing in 8th place.

Participated in 2000 Summer Olympics, in Sydney, where he won the bronze medal in the 4×100-metre freestyle. He also got the 13th place in the 4×200-metre freestyle, and the 23rd place in the 50-metre freestyle.

At the 2001 World Aquatics Championships in Fukuoka, he was in the semifinal of the 100-metre freestyle, finishing in 15th place.

In March 2002, at the 36th South American Championships, he won a gold medal in the 50-metre freestyle.
