= Maya Merhige =

American swimmer

Maya Merhige is an American marathon swimmer from the state of California.

== Early Life ==
Maya was born on July 24, 2007 in Cincinnati, Ohio. She grew up in Berkeley, California, where she began learning how to swim at age two. She attended Berkeley High School, graduating in 2029. She currently attends Georgetown University in Washington, DC as a sophomore.

== Career ==
Maya completed her first marathon swim in August 2020 with the True Width of Lake Tahoe. The following year, she became the youngest woman to swim the Catalina Channel, a 20.1 mile stretch between Santa Catalina Island and Long Beach, CA. She completed this swim on September 6, 2021 in 10 hours and 58 minutes.

In 2022, she continued swimming in California, this time completing the 21.3-mile Length of Lake Tahoe overnight. She was 14 years old.

In January 2023, at 15 years old, she became the youngest person to ever swim the Molokai Channel, also known as the Kaiwi Channel and the ‘Channel of Bones’. It is a 28-mile stretch between Molokai and Oahu islands in the Hawaiian islands. After fighting headwinds and jellyfish for more than half the swim, Maya touched shore after 27 hours and 33 minutes. She became the world record holder for the longest successful crossing of the Molokai Channel. It was her second of the Oceans Seven.

Later that year, in July 2023, Merhige swam a 28.5-mile route around the island of Manhattan in 8 hours and 43 minutes. In 2024, she swam 23 miles from England to France.

In March 2025, Maya crossed the Cook Strait in 14 hours and seven minutes. This swim is a stretch between the Northern and Southern islands of New Zealand, notorious for its strong currents and dangerous jellyfish. According to sources, Maya was repeatedly stung throughout the entire crossing, including in her mouth and on her face.

According to Swim Across America, Merhige has raised a total of $190,000 as of September 2026. She hopes to raise an additional $10,000 this year.
