= Daniel O'Keeffe (swimmer) =

Guamanian swimmer (born 1972)

Daniel "Dan" O'Keeffe
Personal information
- Full name: Daniel O'Keeffe
- National team: Guam
- Born: 3 August 1972 (age 53) Tumon, Guam
- Height: 1.88 m (6 ft 2 in)
- Weight: 88 kg (194 lb)

Sport
- Sport: Swimming
- Strokes: Butterfly
- College team: University of California, Los Angeles (U.S.)
- Coach: Ron Ballatore (U.S.)

Daniel O'Keeffe (born August 3, 1972) is a Guamanian former swimmer, who specialized in butterfly events. He is a two-time Olympian (2000 and 2004), and currently holds a Guamanian record in the 100-meter butterfly (55.05).

O'Keeffe was also a former member of coach Ron Ballatore's UCLA Bruins swimming and diving team at the University of California, Los Angeles, before returning to Guam in 1995.

O'Keeffe made his official debut, as Guam's only swimmer, at the 2000 Summer Olympics in Sydney, where he competed in the men's 100 m butterfly. Swimming in heat two, he posted a lifetime best of 56.05 to take a fourth seed and forty-fifth overall by a hundredth of a second (0.01) behind Algeria's Mehdi Addadi.

At the 2004 Summer Olympics in Athens, O'Keeffe qualified again for the 100 m butterfly, by receiving a Universality place from FINA, in an invitation time of 56.96. He challenged seven other swimmers on the second heat, including fellow two-time Olympians Conrad Francis of Sri Lanka and Nicholas Rees of the Bahamas. He edged out Aruba's Davy Bisslik to take a seventh spot by 0.46 of a second in 57.39. O'Keeffe failed to advance into the semifinals, as he placed fifty-fifth overall in the preliminaries.

O'Keeffe formerly lived in Guam, where he worked partly as a sports development officer for the Guam National Olympic Committee, President of the Guam Swimming Federation, and a president of the Greater Pacific Aquatics. O'Keeffe currently lives near St. Louis, Missouri where he is the coach of the Sunset Hills Stingrays summer swim team in Edwardsville, Illinois. His sister Garland O'Keeffe, a former world ranked swimmer, was also a former head coach of the women's swimming team at the University of Iowa.
