= Alie Stijl =

Dutch swimmer (1923–1999)

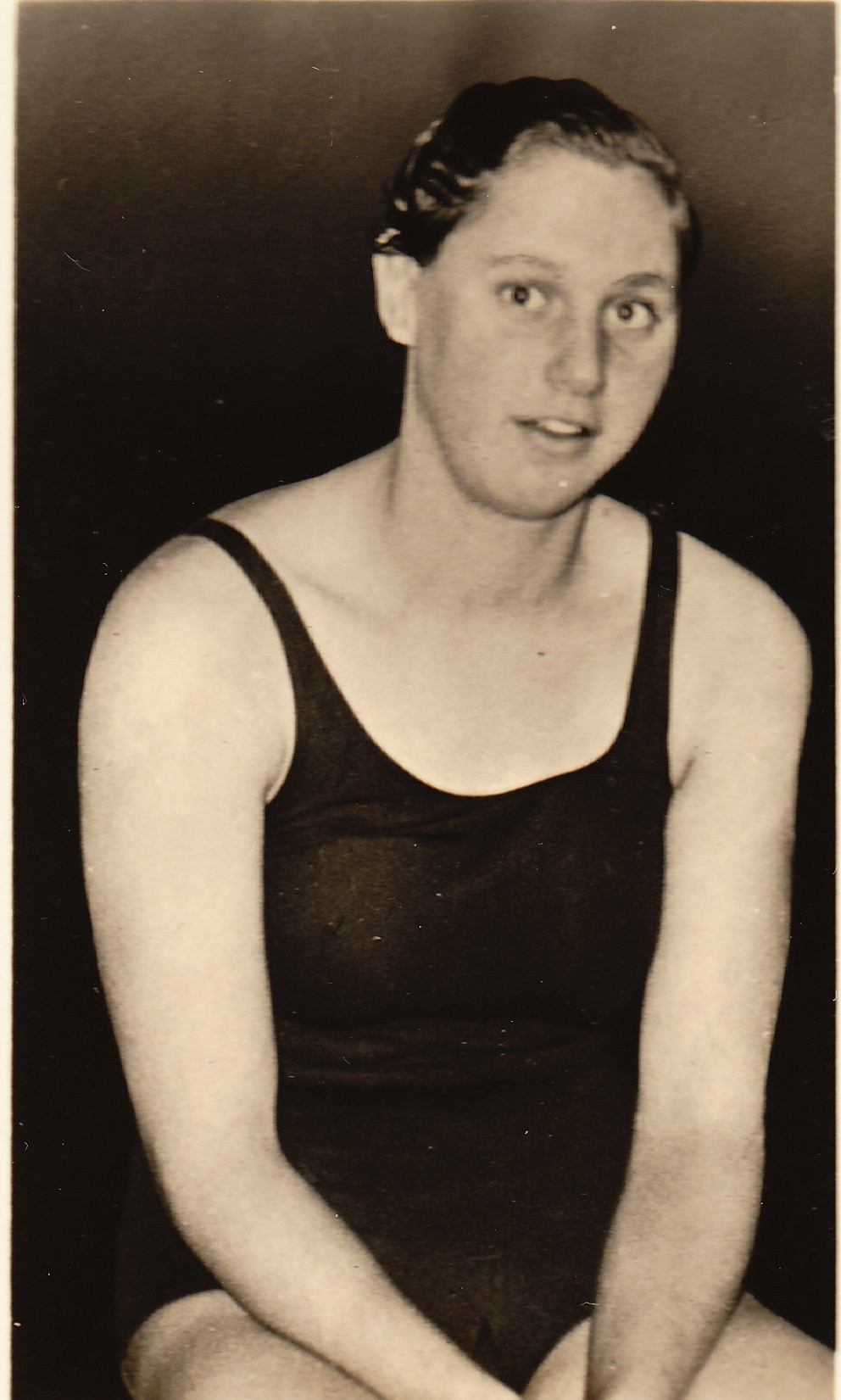
- Alie Stijl c. 1938

Personal information
- Born: 29 January 1923 Amsterdam, the Netherlands
- Died: 20 May 1999 (aged 76) Emmeloord, the Netherlands

Sport
- Sport: Swimming
- Club: Amsterdamsche Dames Zwemclub; HZ Zian; De Meeuwen
Medal record
Representing the Netherlands
European Championships
| Silver medal – second place | 1938 London | 4×100 m freestyle |

Aaltje "Alie" Stijl (29 January 1923 – 20 May 1999) was a Dutch swimmer who won a silver medal in the 4 × 100 m freestyle relay at the 1938 European Aquatics Championships. Less than two years later, on 12 January 1940, she set a world record in the 100 yd breaststroke. She had no chance to compete at the Olympics, which were cancelled in 1940 and 1944. In 1941 she became engaged to a German soldier and moved to Germany, where she continued competing during the war. Around 1944 she returned to the Netherlands, and between 1948 and 1988 was married to Johan Kistemaker.
