= Leigh Nugent =

Australian swimming coach

Leigh Nugent is an Australian swimming coach. He was the head coach of the Australian swimming team at the 2004 Summer Olympics in Athens. Under his leadership, Australia tallied seven gold, five silver and three bronze, its best ever haul at an Olympics outside of Australia, and second only to the team which represented Australia at the 1956 Summer Olympics.

Following the 2004 Olympics, he returned to his previous job as the head youth coach, but took on the top job again in 2009 after Alan Thompson was removed from that position. Under his leadership, the Australian team won half the gold medals at the 2010 Commonwealth Games, but in the 2011 World Aquatics Championships the national team won just two gold medals. Nugent continued to lead the team at the 2012 Summer Olympics, but Australia won just a single gold medal there.

Nugent announced his resignation as head coach of the Australian swimming team in March 2013 following that deterioration in medal results combined with reports of misconduct within the team.
