= Trude Malcorps =

Dutch swimmer (1921–2026)

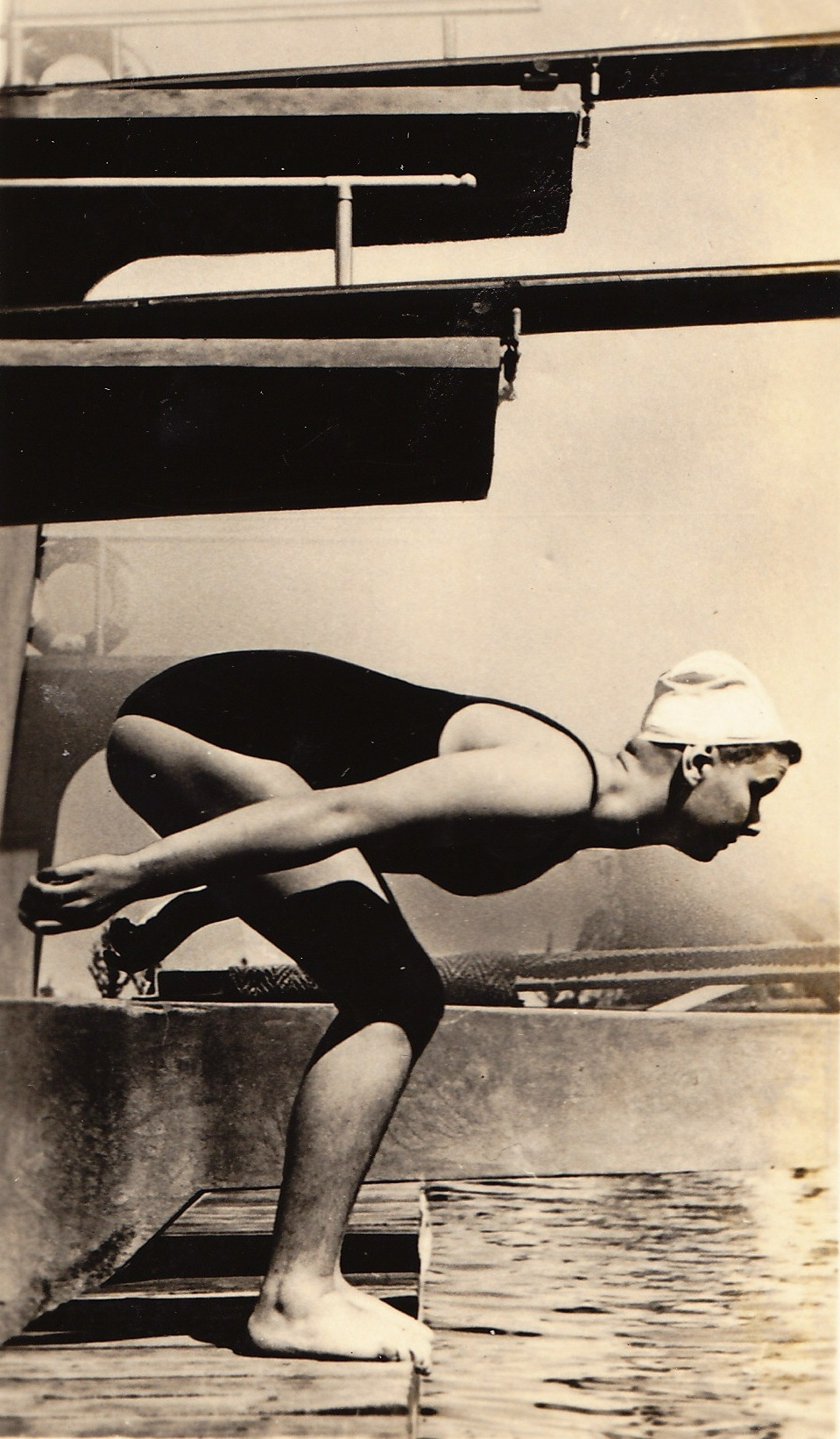
- Trude Malcorps c. 1938

Personal information
- Born: 7 February 1921 Zwolle, Netherlands
- Died: 13 January 2026 (aged 104) Amsterdam, Netherlands

Sport
- Sport: Swimming
Medal record
Representing the Netherlands
European Championships
Silver medal – second place	1938 London	4×100 m freestyle

Gertrude Jacoba Malcorps (7 February 1921 – 13 January 2026) was a Dutch swimmer who won a silver medal in the 4 × 100 m freestyle relay at the 1938 European Aquatics Championships.

== Biography ==
Gertrude Jacoba Malcorps was born in Zwolle, Netherlands on 7 February 1921. She had an elder brother Max Malcorps (1917–2011), a mayor of Hasselt, Overijssel (1948–1971) and Harderwijk (1971–1978).

On 21 May 1942, she married Huibert Hendrik Kervers. Malcorps died in Amsterdam on 13 January 2026, at the age of 104.
