= Dick Langerhorst =

Dutch swimmer (1946–2008)

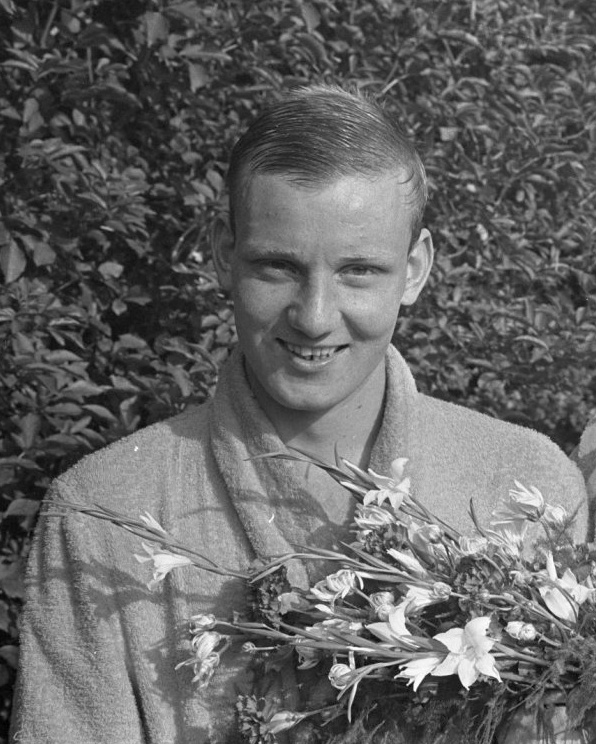
- Dick Langerhorst in 1968

Personal information
- Born: 26 March 1946 Amsterdam, the Netherlands
- Died: 13 May 2008 (aged 62) Noordwijk, the Netherlands
- Height: 1.83 m (6 ft 0 in)
- Weight: 79 kg (174 lb)

Sport
- Sport: Swimming
- Club: HZ&PC, Den Haag

Dirk Frans Arie "Dick" Langerhorst (26 March 1946 – 13 May 2008) was a Dutch swimmer. He competed in three events at the 1964 and 1968 Summer Olympics, but failed to reach the finals. Between 1964 and 1969 he dominated national championships, winning 24 titles and setting 27 national records in freestyle and butterfly disciplines.

After retiring from swimming he continued playing water polo and worked as a fitness coach.
