= Johan Schans =

Dutch swimmer

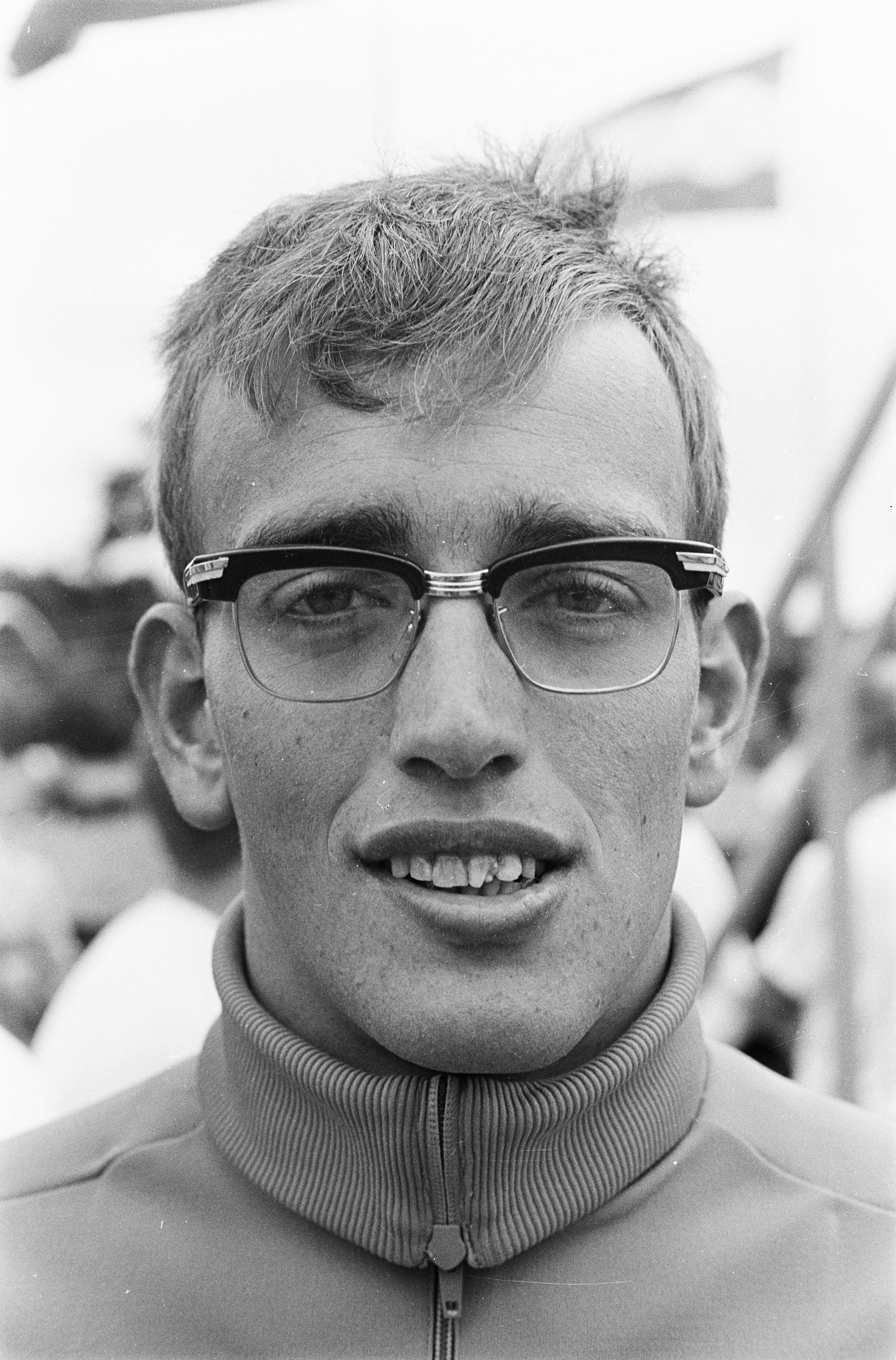
- Johan Schans in 1968

Personal information
- Born: 14 May 1949 (age 77) Utrecht, Netherlands
- Height: 1.87 m (6 ft 2 in)
- Weight: 80 kg (180 lb)

Sport
- Sport: Swimming
- Club: De Vechtstreek, Utrecht

Johannes "Johan" Schans (born 14 May 1949) is a retired Dutch swimmer. He competed in the 200 m and 4 × 200 m freestyle events at the 1968 Summer Olympics, but failed to reach the finals.

In 1969 he changed to marathon swimming and finished second in the 42 km (26 mile) Traversée internationale du Lac St-Jean professional race in 10 h 12' and fourth in the 57 km (36 mile) Santa Fe-Coronda river swim in Argentina in 8 h 1'. Overall he was ranked 2nd in the world in 1969 and first in 1970. Later in the 1970s he broke the world record in 10 mile swim more than once. In 1970, he was inducted to the International Marathon Swimming Hall of Fame.
