= Sieta Posthumus =

Dutch swimmer

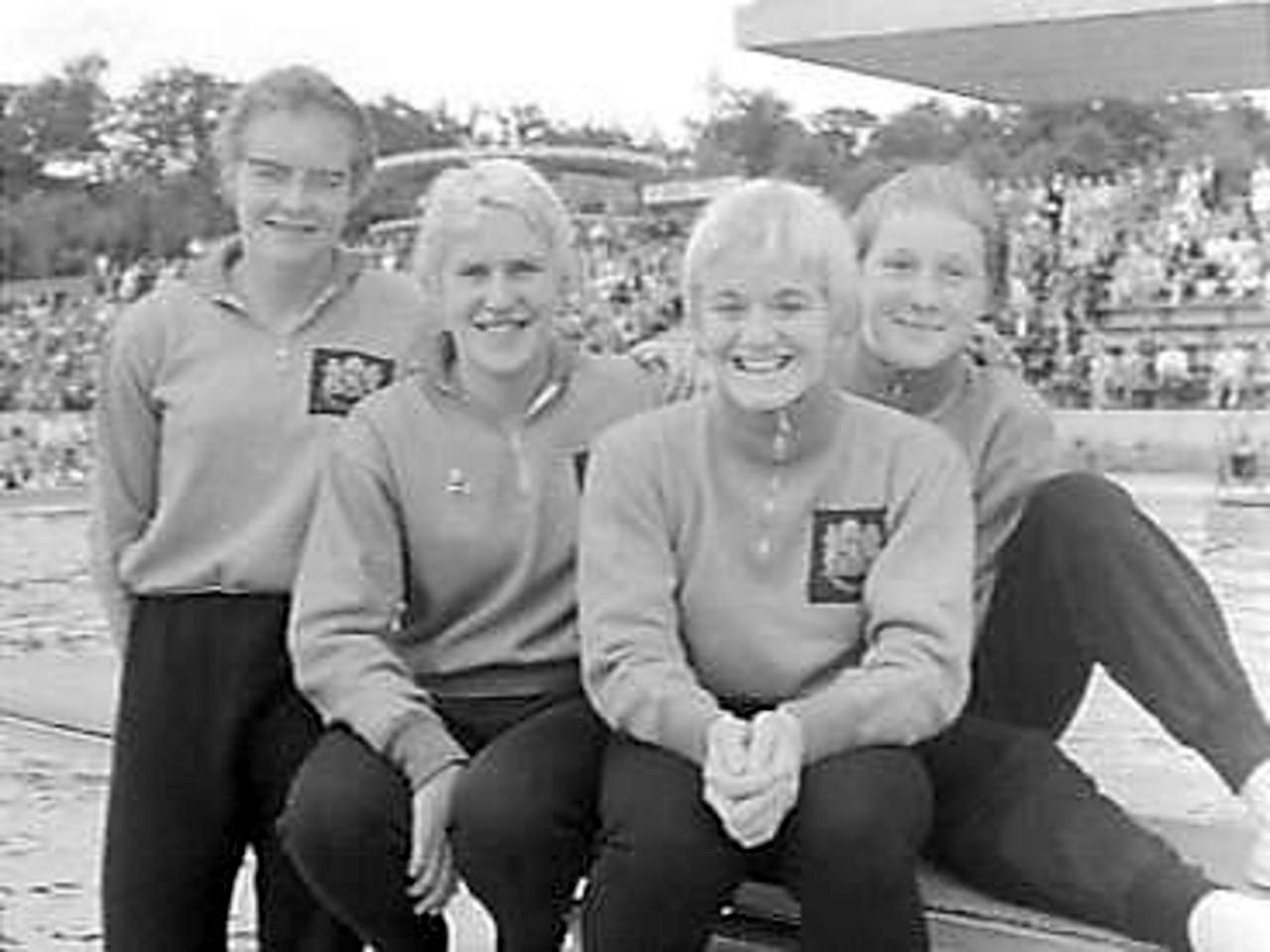
- Cocky Gastelaars, Judith de Nijs, Sita Posthumus and Astrid Ording in 1959 after setting a national record in the 4×100 m freestyle relay

Personal information
- Born: 22 April 1936 Leeuwarden, the Netherlands
- Died: 3 October 2013 (aged 77)
- Height: 1.61 m (5 ft 3 in)
- Weight: 59 kg (130 lb)

Sport
- Sport: Swimming
- Club: LZC '29, Leeuwarden

Sieta Posthumus (22 April 1936 – 3 October 2013) was a Dutch freestyle swimmer who participated in the 1960 Summer Olympics in the 4×100 m freestyle relay. Her team was expected to compete for medals, but was disqualified in the preliminary round because she jumped in water while her team mate, Jopie Troost, had not yet completed her leg. During the warm up, Posthumus hit the wall of the pool with her head, and it was revealed later that she suffered a concussion. She retired from swimming six months after the Games.
