= Artūrs Jakovļevs =

Latvian swimmer

Personal information
- Full name: Artūrs Jakovļevs
- National team: Latvia
- Born: 30 May 1967 (age 59) Riga, Latvian SSR, Soviet Union
- Height: 1.92 m (6 ft 4 in)
- Weight: 85 kg (187 lb)

Sport
- Sport: Swimming
- Strokes: Butterfly
- Club: Rīga Swimming School
- Coach: Alberts Pisarevs; Vladimirs Maslovskis

Artūrs Jakovļevs (born May 30, 1967) is a Latvian former swimmer, who specialized in sprint butterfly events. He is a three-time Olympian (1992, 1996, and 2000), a former Latvian record holder in the 100 m butterfly, and a member of the national swimming team under head coaches Alberts Pisarevs and Vladimirs Maslovskis.

Jakovļevs became the first ever Latvian swimmer to compete at the 1992 Summer Olympics in Barcelona since the post-Soviet era. In the 100 m butterfly, he placed thirty-third on the morning prelims in a national record of 55.95.

On his second Olympic appearance in Atlanta 1996, Jakovļevs failed to reach the top 16 final in the 100 m butterfly, finishing in forty-ninth place with a time of 56.62.

Eight years after competing in his first Olympics, Jakovļevs qualified for his third team in the men's 100 m butterfly, as a 33-year-old, at the 2000 Summer Olympics in Sydney. He achieved a FINA B-standard entry time of 56.58 from the European Championships in Helsinki, Finland. Swimming in heat one, he held off Sri Lanka's Conrad Francis by almost half a body length to race for the fourth seed in his personal best of 56.63. Jakovļevs failed to advance into the semifinals, as he placed fifty-sixth overall in the prelims.
