= Hugues Legault =

Canadian swimmer (born 1974)

Personal information
- Full name: Hugues Legault
- National team: Canada
- Born: January 14, 1974 (age 52) Montreal, Quebec
- Height: 1.84 m (6 ft 0 in)
- Weight: 76 kg (168 lb)

Sport
- Sport: Swimming
- Strokes: Freestyle
- Club: Piscines du Parc Olympique

Hugues Legault (born January 14, 1974) is a former freestyle swimmer who represented Canada at the 1996 Summer Olympics in Atlanta, Georgia. Legault competed in the preliminary heats of the men's 50-metre freestyle, but did not advance. He finished 39th overall in a field of 64.

Legault is the older brother of swimmer Karine Legault, who competed at the 2000 Summer Olympics.

His son, Justin Legault, participated in the 2022 Canada Games.
