= Joseph N. Callahan =

American swimmer

Joseph M. Callahan
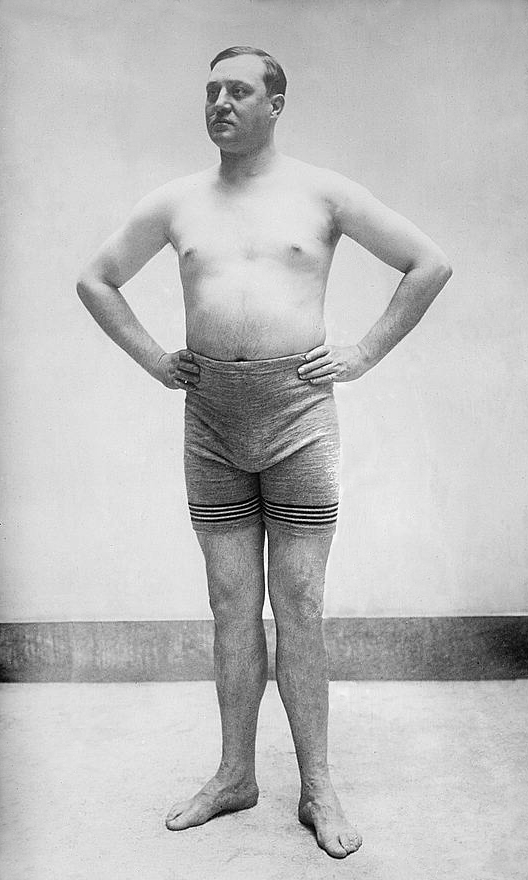

Personal information
- Nationality: USA
- Born: Pittsburgh, Pennsylvania, United States

Sport
- Sport: Swimming
- Strokes: Freestyle
- Club: East Liberty Bath Polo Team
- Coach: Harry Brown

Joseph M. Callahan was a record winning American endurance swimmer from Pittsburgh, Pennsylvania. In 1907 he set the record for swimming the 12 miles of Manila Bay in 4.5 hours. The swim was viewed by many U.S. soldiers.

He had also completed a swim in San Juan Harbor Bay in Puerto Rico in one and a half hours. Coached by Harry Brown, Callahan completed a Pittsburgh area swim which passed through the Davis Island Dam, and went from the Smithfield Street Bridge to Coney Island in 2 hours, 35 minutes.

A prior veteran, apparently in the Spanish American War, Calahan was a member of Pittsburgh's William McKinley VFW Post.
