= Thijs van Valkengoed =

Dutch swimmer

Personal information
- Full name: Thijs Maarten van Valkengoed
- Nationality: Netherlands
- Born: 6 July 1983 (age 43) Lelystad
- Height: 1.86 m (6 ft 1 in)

Sport
- Sport: Swimming
- Strokes: Breaststroke
- Club: AZ&PC
Medal record
Men's swimming
Representing the Netherlands
European Championships (SC)
Bronze medal – third place	2003 Dublin	200 m breaststroke

Thijs Maarten van Valkengoed (born 6 July 1983 in Lelystad) is a breaststroke swimmer from the Netherlands, who competed for his native country at the 2004 Summer Olympics in Athens, Greece and the 2008 Summer Olympics in Beijing. He trains together with his sister Jolijn in their hometown.

== Swimming career ==
Thijs debuted at the international stage during the 2002 European Aquatics Championships in Berlin. Van Valkengoed's main achievement is winning the bronze medal in the 200 m breaststroke at the European Short Course Swimming Championships 2003 in Dublin, Ireland. Earlier that month he had qualified for the 2004 Summer Olympics while setting national records in the 100 m and 200 m breaststroke. At the Olympics he was eliminated in the semi-finals of the 100 m breaststroke, and in the heats of the 200 m breaststroke.

=== Overtraining ===
After the disappointing results in Montreal at the 2005 World Aquatics Championships it appeared that Thijs had been overtraining himself for a long period of time. He had to rest for the whole 2006 season.

=== Comeback ===
After his overtraining he decided to move back from Amsterdam to Lelystad and started to train with his sister with the goal to qualify themselves for the 2008 European Aquatics Championships in Eindhoven. At the end of 2007 both Thijs and Jolijn van Valkengoed qualified for the European Championship in their home country. During the European championships, Thijs improved his own national record at the 100 m breaststroke to 1:01.22 and qualified for his second Olympics. Later on his sister qualified herself for the medley relay at the 2008 Summer Olympics. Just days before the Games started, during the training-camp in Hong Kong, Thijs became ill. Due to the illness Thijs couldn't lower his national record again.

== Personal bests ==
Short course
Event	Time	Date	Location
50 m breaststroke	28.20	2008-04-12	Manchester, United Kingdom
100 m breaststroke	59.76	2008-04-09	Manchester, United Kingdom
200 m breaststroke	2:08.30 NR	2003-12-14	Dublin, Ireland

Long course
Event	Time	Date	Location
50 m breaststroke	28.51	2008-03-22	Eindhoven, Netherlands
100 m breaststroke	1:01.22	2008-03-18	Eindhoven, Netherlands
200 m breaststroke	2:13.32	2003-12-04	Federal Way, USA

== See also ==
- Dutch records in swimming
