= Karine Legault =

Canadian swimmer

Personal information
- Full name: Karine Legault
- National team: Canada
- Born: August 4, 1978 (age 47) Saint-Eustache, Quebec
- Height: 1.85 m (6 ft 1 in)
- Weight: 76 kg (168 lb)

Sport
- Sport: Swimming
- Strokes: Freestyle
- Club: Piscines du Parc Olympique
- College team: Vanier College

Karine Legault (born August 4, 1978) is a former freestyle swimmer who competed for Canada at the 2000 Summer Olympics in Sydney, Australia. There she ended up in 16th place in the women's 800-metre freestyle, clocking 8:43.56 in the preliminary heats. She also competed in the preliminary heats of the 400-metre freestyle, and finished 19th with a time of 4:15.55.

Her older brother Hugues Legault also competed in swimming, and represented Canada at the 1996 Summer Olympics.
