= Joe Callaghan =

New Zealand footballer

Personal information
- Full name: Joseph P Callaghan
- Place of birth: New Zealand
- Position: Goalkeeper

Senior career*
Years	Team	Apps	(Gls)
- Shamrock

International career
1960	New Zealand	2	(0)
- * Club domestic league appearances and goals

Joseph Callaghan is a former association football goalkeeper who represented New Zealand at international level.

Callaghan played two official A-international matches for the New Zealand in 1960, both against Pacific minnows Tahiti, the first a 5–1 win on 5 September, the second a 2–1 win on 12 September 1960.
