= Jolijn van Valkengoed =

Dutch swimmer (born 1981)

Personal information
- Born: August 26, 1981 (age 44)
Medal record
Women's Swimming
Representing the Netherlands
European Championships (LC)
Bronze medal – third place	2008 Eindhoven	4×100 m medley

Jolijn van Valkengoed (born August 26, 1981, in Lelystad) is a Dutch swimmer, who mainly specializes in breaststroke. She is currently training in her hometown Lelystad together with her younger brother Thijs. At the age of 24 she made her international debut at the European Championships 2006 in Budapest. At the 2008 European Aquatics Championships in Eindhoven she won a bronze medal in the 4×100 medley relay. She also qualified for Beijing 2008 as the breaststroke swimmer in the 4×100 medley relay. At the short course she has been the owner of the national record in the 50 m breaststroke.

== See also ==
- List of Dutch records in swimming
- List of swimmers
