= List of Baltic records in swimming =

This is a list of the Baltic records in swimming. These are the fastest times ever swum by a swimmer representing one of the Baltic countries:

- Estonia
- Latvia
- Lithuania

== Long course (50 m) ==
=== Men ===
Event	Time		Name	Nationality	Date	Meet	Location	Ref
50 m freestyle	21.70	so	Simonas Bilis	Lithuania	8 August 2018	European Championships	Glasgow, United Kingdom	
100 m freestyle	47.75		Tomas Navikonis	Lithuania	12 August 2026	European Championships	Paris, France	
200 m freestyle	1:44.38		Danas Rapšys	Lithuania	17 August 2019	World Cup	Singapore, Singapore	
400 m freestyle	3:43.36		Danas Rapšys	Lithuania	12 May 2019	Champions Swim Series	Budapest, Hungary	
800 m freestyle	7:57.88		Kregor Zirk	Estonia	2 June 2021	Mare Nostrum	Canet-en-Roussillon, France	
1500 m freestyle	15:11.86		Džiugas Miškinis	Lithuania	6 May 2026	Indy Spring Cup	Indianapolis, United States	
50 m backstroke	24.54		Mantas Kaušpėdas	Lithuania	24 April 2026	Lithuanian Championships	Vilnius, Lithuania	
100 m backstroke	53.76		Danas Rapšys	Lithuania	27 May 2017	Romanian International Championships	Bucharest, Romania	
200 m backstroke	1:56.11	sf	Danas Rapšys	Lithuania	27 July 2017	World Championships	Budapest, Hungary	
50 m breaststroke	27.09	sf	Aleksas Savickas	Lithuania	14 August 2026	European Championships	Paris, France	
100 m breaststroke	58.96	sf	Giedrius Titenis	Lithuania	2 August 2015	World Championships	Kazan, Russia	
200 m breaststroke	2:07.80		Giedrius Titenis	Lithuania	31 July 2009	World Championships	Rome, Italy	
50 m butterfly	22.92	sf	Ralf Tribuntsov	Estonia	10 August 2026	European Championships	Paris, France	
100 m butterfly	51.83		Tajus Juška	Lithuania	21 August 2025	World Junior Championships	Otopeni, Romania	
200 m butterfly	1:54.22	sf	Kregor Zirk	Estonia	30 July 2024	Olympic Games	Paris, France	
200 m individual medley	1:59.14		Danas Rapšys	Lithuania	16 August 2019	World Cup	Singapore, Singapore	
400 m individual medley	4:19.65		Vytautas Janušaitis	Lithuania	10 June 2009	Mare Nostrum	Canet-en-Roussillon, France	
4×50 m freestyle relay	1:31.96		Ralf Tribuntsov (23.51); Henri Reinsalu (23.21); Martti Aljand (22.84); Pjotr Degtjarjov (22.40)	(Estonia) Audentese SK	17 June 2016	Estonian Championships	Tartu, Estonia	
4×100 m freestyle relay	3:12.74	h	Tajus Juška (48.60); Tomas Navikonis (47.47); Tomas Lukminas (47.83); Danas Rapšys (48.84)	Lithuania	27 July 2025	World Championships	Singapore, Singapore	
4×200 m freestyle relay	7:03.53		Danas Rapšys (1:45.62); Tomas Navikonis (1:45.45); Kristupas Trepočka (1:47.16); Tajus Juška (1:45.30)	Lithuania	10 August 2026	European Championships	Paris, France	
4×50 m medley relay	1:41.10		Ralf Tribuntsov (25.84); Martti Aljand (28.14); Priit Aavik (24.57); Pjotr Degtjarjov (22.55)	(Estonia) Audentese SK	18 June 2016	Estonian Championships	Tartu, Estonia	
4×100 m medley relay	3:33.70		Danas Rapšys (54.80); Andrius Šidlauskas (58.80); Deividas Margevičius (52.29); Simonas Bilis (47.81)	Lithuania	9 August 2018	European Championships	Glasgow, United Kingdom	

Legend: WR – World record; ER – European record; e – equalled existing record;
Records not set in finals: h – heat; sf – semifinal; r – relay 1st leg; rh – relay heat 1st leg; b – B final; † – en route to final mark; tt – time trial

=== Women ===
Event	Time		Name	Nationality	Date	Meet	Location	Ref
50 m freestyle	25.01		Triin Aljand	Estonia	27 May 2012	European Championships	Debrecen, Hungary	
100 m freestyle	54.74		Smiltė Plytnykaitė	Lithuania	15 April 2023	Lithuanian Championships	Kaunas, Lithuania	
200 m freestyle	1:56.90	sf	Ieva Jurkūnaitė	Lithuania	12 August 2026	European Championships	Paris, France	
400 m freestyle	4:15.46		Aivi Liiv-Kiil	Estonia	16 January 1984	-	Moscow, Soviet Union	
800 m freestyle	8:46.32		Aivi Liiv-Kiil	Estonia	18 January 1984	-	Moscow, Soviet Union	
1500 m freestyle	17:12.26		Kirke Mõtsnik	Estonia	24 April 2026	German Championships	Berlin, Germany	
50 m backstroke	28.08	sf	Emilija Pociūtė	Lithuania	12 August 2026	European Championships	Paris, France	
100 m backstroke	1:01.05		Kristīna Šteins	Latvia	7 April 2016	Canadian Olympic Trials	Toronto, Canada	
200 m backstroke	2:11.56		Ugnė Mažutaitytė	Lithuania	8 December 2019	U.S. Open	Atlanta, United States	
50 m breaststroke	29.16	WR	Rūta Meilutytė	Lithuania	30 July 2023	World Championships	Fukuoka, Japan	
100 m breaststroke	1:04.35	sf, ER	Rūta Meilutytė	Lithuania	29 July 2013	World Championships	Barcelona, Spain	
200 m breaststroke	2:22.86		Kotryna Teterevkova	Lithuania	5 August 2023	World University Games	Chengdu, China	
50 m butterfly	25.92		Triin Aljand	Estonia	22 May 2012	European Championships	Debrecen, Hungary	
100 m butterfly	59.00	h	Triin Aljand	Estonia	26 July 2009	World Championships	Rome, Italy	
200 m butterfly	2:13.95	h	Ieva Maļuka	Latvia	15 August 2026	European Championships	Paris, France	
200m individual medley	2:12.32		Rūta Meilutytė	Lithuania	29 August 2013	World Junior Championships	Dubai, United Arab Emirates	
400m individual medley	4:48.50	h	Ieva Maļuka	Latvia	12 August 2026	European Championships	Paris, France	
4×50m freestyle relay	1:47.63		Kätlin Sepp (27.51); Margaret Markvardt (26.07); Katriin Kersa (27.18); Karleen Kersa (26.87)	(Estonia) TOP	17 June 2016	Estonian Championships	Tallinn, Estonia	
4×100m freestyle relay	3:42.78		Ieva Jurkunaite (55.77); Ieva Visockaite (55.93); Smiltė Plytnykaitė (55.71); Sylvia Statkevičius (55.37)	Lithuania	1 July 2025	European Junior Championships	Šamorín, Slovakia	
4×200m freestyle relay	8:02.15		Ieva Jurkunaite (2:00.56); Sylvia Statkevičius (1:59.32); Ieva Visockaite (2:01.10); Ieva Nainyte (2:01.17)	Lithuania	3 July 2025	European Junior Championships	Šamorín, Slovakia	
4×50m medley relay	1:57.05		Sigrid Sepp (29.89); Karleen Kersa (32.16); Margaret Markvardt (28.10); Kätlin Sepp (26.90)	(Estonia) TOP	18 June 2017	Estonian Championships	Tartu, Estonia	
4×100m medley relay	4:05.22		Emilija Pociūtė (1:02.47); Smiltė Plytnykaitė (1:06.76); Guoda Trucinskaite (1:01.38); Sylvia Statkevičius (54.61)	Lithuania	6 July 2025	European Junior Championships	Šamorín, Slovakia	

Legend: WR – World record; ER – European record; e – equalled existing record;
Records not set in finals: h – heat; sf – semifinal; r – relay 1st leg; rh – relay heat 1st leg; b – B final; † – en route to final mark; so – swim-off; tt – time trial

=== Mixed relay ===
Event	Time	Name	Nationality	Date	Meet	Location	Ref
4×100 m freestyle relay	3:31.48	Rokas Jazdauskas (50.76); Kristupas Trepocka (50.13); Smiltė Plytnykaitė (55.16); Sylvia Statkevičius (55.43)	Lithuania	6 September 2023	World Junior Championships	Netanya, Israel	
4×200 m freestyle relay	7:28.35	Danas Rapšys (1:47.38); Tomas Navikonis (1:45.59); Sylvia Statkevičius (1:58.68); Ieva Jurkūnaitė (1:56.40)	Lithuania	15 August 2026	European Championships	Paris, France	
4×100 m medley relay	3:50.23	Mantas Kaušpėdas (54.68); Smiltė Plytnykaitė (1:07.38); Kristupas Trepočka (52.95); Sylvia Statkevičius (55.22)	Lithuania	5 July 2024	European Junior Championships	Vilnius, Lithuania	

Legend: e – equalled existing record;
Records not set in finals: h – heat; so – swim-off

== Short course (25 m) ==
=== Men ===
Event	Time		Name	Nationality	Date	Meet	Location	Ref
50 m freestyle	20.77	rh	Ralf Tribuntsov	Estonia	2 December 2025	European Championships	Lublin, Poland	
100 m freestyle	45.87	h, =	Tomas Lukminas	Lithuania	5 December 2025	European Championships	Lublin, Poland	
100 m freestyle	45.87	=	Tomas Lukminas	Lithuania	6 December 2025	European Championships	Lublin, Poland	
200 m freestyle	1:40.85		Danas Rapšys	Lithuania	14 December 2017	European Championships	Copenhagen, Denmark	
400 m freestyle	3:33.20		Danas Rapšys	Lithuania	4 December 2019	European Championships	Glasgow, Great Britain	
800 m freestyle	7:44.19		Kregor Zirk	Estonia	26 October 2024	World Cup	Incheon, South Korea	
1500 m freestyle	14:42.94		Džiugas Miškinis	Lithuania	13 December 2024	Lithuanian Championships	Vilnius, Lithuania	
50m backstroke	22.63	sf	Ralf Tribuntsov	Estonia	6 December 2025	European Championships	Lublin, Poland	
100m backstroke	49.88		Ralf Tribuntsov	Estonia	15 October 2026	World Cup	Astana, Kazakhstan	
200m backstroke	1:49.64		Danas Rapšys	Lithuania	6 August 2017	World Cup	Berlin, Germany	
50m breaststroke	26.06		Andrius Šidlauskas	Lithuania	20 December 2025	Lithuanian Championships	Vilnius, Lithuania	
100m breaststroke	56.81		Andrius Šidlauskas	Lithuania	19 December 2025	Lithuanian Championships	Vilnius, Lithuania	
200m breaststroke	2:04.78	h	Martin Allikvee	Estonia	5 December 2019	European Championships	Glasgow, Great Britain	
50m butterfly	22.06	sf	Daniel Zaitsev	Estonia	2 December 2025	European Championships	Lublin, Poland	
100m butterfly	50.48	sf	Daniel Zaitsev	Estonia	17 December 2022	World Championships	Melbourne, Australia	
200m butterfly	1:50.39	h	Kregor Zirk	Estonia	12 December 2024	World Championships	Budapest, Hungary	
100m individual medley	51.54		Ralf Tribuntsov	Estonia	6 November 2026	Memoriał Marka Petrusewicza	Wrocław, Poland	
200m individual medley	1:52.22		Vytautas Janušaitis	Lithuania	10 December 2009	European Championships	Istanbul, Turkey	
400m individual medley	4:05.85		Vytautas Janušaitis	Lithuania	26 November 2010	European Championships	Eindhoven, Netherlands	
4×50m freestyle relay	1:25.03	h	Ralf Tribuntsov (20.77); Daniel Zaitsev (21.02); Kregor Zirk (21.54); Siim Keskula (21.70)	Estonia	2 December 2025	European Championships	Lublin, Poland	
4×100m freestyle relay	3:11.54		Tomas Lukminas (47.05); Anas Augustinavicius (48.59); Arminas Murenas (48.87); Kristupas Trepočka (47.03)	Lithuania	20 December 2025	Lithuanian Championships	Vilnius, Lithuania	
4×200m freestyle relay	7:03.39	h	Danas Rapšys (1:40.95); Deividas Margevicius (1:45.75); Andrius Šidlauskas (1:49.36); Tadas Duškinas (1:47.33)	Lithuania	14 December 2018	World Championships	Hangzhou, China	
4×50m medley relay	1:33.22	h	Mantas Kaušpėdas (23.38); Andrius Šidlauskas (25.68); Tajus Juška (23.31); Tomas Lukminas (20.85)	Lithuania	7 December 2025	European Championships	Lublin, Poland	
4×100m medley relay	3:24.51		Danas Rapšys (51.44); Andrius Šidlauskas (57.14); Deividas Margevicius (50.01); Simonas Bilis (45.92)	Lithuania	16 December 2018	World Championships	Hangzhou, China	

Legend: WR – World record; ER – European record; e – equalled existing record;
Records not set in finals: h – heat; sf – semifinal; r – relay 1st leg; rh – relay heat 1st leg; b – B final; † – en route to final mark; so – swim-off; tt – time trial

=== Women ===
Event	Time		Name	Nationality	Date	Meet	Location	Ref
50m freestyle	23.92	sf	Triin Aljand	Estonia	13 December 2009	European Championships	Istanbul, Turkey	
100m freestyle	53.54	h	Rūta Meilutytė	Lithuania	13 December 2012	World Championships	Istanbul, Turkey	
200m freestyle	1:56.58		Sylvia Statkevičius	Lithuania	13 December 2024	Ontario Junior International Championships	Toronto, Canada	
400m freestyle	4:11.25		Jūratė Ščerbinskaitė	Lithuania	20 December 2013	Lithuanian Championships	Anykščiai, Lithuania	
800m freestyle	8:43.45		Jelena Petrova	Estonia	22 November 2005	Estonian Championships	Keila, Estonia	
1500m freestyle	16:47.30		Kirke Mõtsnik	Estonia	19 December 2025	Estonian Championships	Tallinn, Estonia	
50m backstroke	27.42		Emilija Pociūtė	Lithuania	14 December 2024	Lithuanian Championships	Vilnius, Lithuania	
100m backstroke	58.72		Maari Randväli	Estonia	12 December 2025	Swim England National Winter Championships	Sheffield, Great Britain	
200m backstroke	2:07.29		Ugnė Mažutaitytė	Lithuania	21 December 2019	Lithuanian Championships	Anykščiai, Lithuania	
50m breaststroke	28.37	sf, WR	Rūta Meilutytė	Lithuania	17 December 2022	World Championships	Melbourne, Australia	
100m breaststroke	1:02.36	=WR	Rūta Meilutytė	Lithuania	12 October 2013	World Cup	Moscow, Russia	
200m breaststroke	2:19.23		Eneli Jefimova	Estonia	19 November 2023	Kalev Open	Tallinn, Estonia	
50m butterfly	25.44		Triin Aljand	Estonia	11 December 2009	European Championships	Istanbul, Turkey	
100m butterfly	58.13	h	Triin Aljand	Estonia	13 November 2008	European Championships	Rijeka, Croatia	
200m butterfly	2:12.08		Ieva Maļuka	Latvia	14 June 2026	Latvian Championships	Jelgava, Latvia	
100m individual medley	57.68		Rūta Meilutytė	Lithuania	14 December 2013	European Championships	Herning, Denmark	
200m individual medley	2:09.55		Rūta Meilutytė	Lithuania	22 December 2012	Lithuanian Championships	Anykščiai, Lithuania	
400m individual medley	4:38.88		Aleksa Gold	Estonia	24 March 2022	U SPORTS Championships	Quebec City, Canada	
4×50m freestyle relay	1:41.64		Triin Aljand; Kätlin Sepp; Tess Grossmann; Annika Saarnak (r)	(Estonia) TOP	21 December 2012	Estonian Championships	Tallinn, Estonia	
4×100m freestyle relay	3:40.92		Ieva Visockaite (55.05); Ieva Nainyte (54.68); Rusnė Vasiliauskaitė (56.95); Ieva Jurkunaite (54.24)	Lithuania	20 December 2025	Lithuanian Championships	Vilnius, Lithuania	
4×200m freestyle relay	8:17.80		Ieva Nainytė (2:02.78); Guoda Stančikaitė (2:04.48); Kotryna Paradnikaitė (2:06.83); Stela Švenčionytė (2:03.71)	Lithuania	28 November 2025	Nordic Championships	Reykjavík, Iceland	
4×50m medley relay	1:49.33	h	Maria Romanjuk (28.62); Eneli Jefimova (29.50); Mariangela Boitsuk (26.11); Aleksa Gold (25.10)	Estonia	7 December 2023	European Championships	Otopeni, Romania	
4×100m medley relay	4:07.94		Sigrid Sepp (1:00.63); Karleen Kersa (1:09.17); Margaret Markvardt (1:00.75); Kätlin Sepp (57.39)	(Estonia) TOP	17 December 2016	Estonian Championships	Tallinn, Estonia	

Legend: WR – World record; ER – European record; e – equalled existing record;
Records not set in finals: h – heat; sf – semifinal; r – relay 1st leg; rh – relay heat 1st leg; b – B final; † – en route to final mark; so – swim-off; tt – time trial

=== Mixed relay ===
Event	Time		Name	Nationality	Date	Meet	Location	Ref
4×50 m freestyle relay	1:34.85	h	Daniel Zaitsev (21.90); Andri Aedma (22.05); Margaret Markvardt (25.76); Kertu Ly Alnek (25.14)	Estonia	16 December 2017	European Championships	Copenhagen, Denmark	
4×100 m freestyle relay	4:11.55		Džiugas Miškinis; Meda Bielskutė; Ūla Adomaitė; Ridas Arštikaitis	(Lithuania) Kauno PM	20 April 2019	Snack King	Kaunas, Lithuania	
4×50 m medley relay	1:38.71		Mantas Kaušpėdas (23.14); Rūta Meilutytė (29.18); Smiltė Plytnykaitė (25.87); Jokubas Keblys (20.52)	Lithuania	3 December 2025	European Championships	Lublin, Poland	
4×100 m medley relay	3:52.51		Emilija Pociūtė (1:00.67); Guoda Tručinskaitė (1:09.96); Ainis Želionis (55.07); Danas Rapšys (46.81)	(Lithuania) Šiaulių "Delfinas"	14 December 2023	Lithuanian Championships	Druskininkai, Lithuania	

Legend: e – equalled existing record;
Records not set in finals: h – heat; so – swim-off

== See also ==
- List of Estonian records in swimming
- List of Latvian records in swimming
- List of Lithuanian records in swimming
- List of Baltic records in athletics
- Baltic States Swimming Championships
