= 2011 Baltic States Swimming Championships =

2011 Baltic Swimming Championships
- Host city: Riga, Latvia
- Date(s): March 12–13, 2011

The 2011 Baltic States Swimming Championships was held in Riga, Latvia, March 12–13, 2011.

== Medal table ==
* Host nation (Latvia)

| Rank | Nation | Gold | Silver | Bronze | Total |
|---|---|---|---|---|---|
| 1 | Lithuania (LTU) | 15 | 15 | 13 | 43 |
| 2 | Estonia (EST) | 10 | 14 | 12 | 36 |
| 3 | Latvia (LAT)* | 9 | 5 | 9 | 23 |
| Totals (3 entries) | | 34 | 34 | 34 | 102 |

== Events ==
- Freestyle: 50 m, 100 m, 200 m, 400 m
- Backstroke: 50 m, 100 m, 200 m
- Breaststroke: 50 m, 100 m, 200 m
- Butterfly: 50 m, 100 m, 200 m
- Individual medley: 200 m, 400 m
- Relay: 4×100 m free, 4×100 m medley

== Results ==
=== Men's events ===
| Event | Gold | | Silver | | Bronze | |
|---|---|---|---|---|---|---|
| 50 m freestyle | Pjotr Degtjarjov (EST) | 23.59 | Uvis Kalniņš (LAT) | 23.90 | Pāvels Gribovskis (LAT) | 24.13 |
| 100 m freestyle | Uvis Kalniņš (LAT) | 51.72 | Pjotr Degtjarjov (EST) | 52.44 | Simonas Bilis (LTU) | 52.76 |
| 200 m freestyle | Uvis Kalniņš (LAT) | 1:54.88 | Lauri Kaki (EST) | 1:56.49 | Simas Žiaukas (LTU) | 1:57.65 |
| 400 m freestyle | Uvis Kalniņš (LAT) | 4:07.78 | Simas Žiaukas (LTU) | 4:08.63 | Lauri Kaki (EST) | 4:14.15 |
| 50 m backstroke | Matas Andriekus (LTU) | 27.00 | Antons Voitovs (LAT) | 27.58 | Ralf Tribuntsov (EST) | 27.94 |
| 100 m backstroke | Andres Olvik (EST) | 57.56 | Matas Andriekus (LTU) | 57.87 | Konstantīns Blohins (LAT) | 59.01 |
| 200 m backstroke | Andres Olvik (EST) | 2:05.05 | Matas Andriekus (LTU) | 2:11.46 | Pāvels Vilcāns (LAT) | 2:12.76 |
| 50 m breaststroke | Giedrius Titenis (LTU) | 28.70 | Vaidotas Blažys (LTU) | 29.49 | Fjodors Mjasojedovs (LAT) | 29.95 |
| 100 m breaststroke | Giedrius Titenis (LTU) | 1:02.99 | Vadim Romanov (EST) | 1:05.57 | Uldis Tazāns (LAT) | 1:06.52 |
| 200 m breaststroke | Giedrius Titenis (LTU) | 2.16.29 | Vadim Romanov (EST) | 2.22.48 | Timo Vaimann (EST) | 2.26.23 |
| 50 m butterfly | Edgaras Štura (LTU) | 25.97 | Pāvels Kondrahins (LAT) | 25.56 | Marko Tiidla (EST) | 25.99 |
| 100 m butterfly | Edgaras Štura (LTU) | 55.79 | Paulius Viktoravičius (LTU) | 57.46 | Oleg Solovjov (EST) | 57.67 |
| 200 m butterfly | Edgaras Štura (LTU) | 2:05.54 | Pavel Narõškin (EST) | 2:09.00 | Artjom Ščemeliov (LTU) | 2:13.63 |
| 200 m individual medley | Tadas Duškinas (LTU) | 2:12.52 | Rokas Čepulis (LTU) | 2:12.88 | Pāvels Vilcāns (LAT) | 2:12.96 |
| 400 m individual medley | Pavel Narõškin (EST) | 4:43.43 | Ilja Jefimov (EST) | 4:44.34 | Rokas Cepulis (LTU) | 4:48.78 |
| 4×100 m freestyle relay | Latvia | 3:31.18 | Estonia | 3:31.97 | Lithuania | 3:33.41 |
| 4×100 m medley relay | Lithuania | 3:50.18 | Estonia | 3:52.21 | Latvia | 3:55.83 |

=== Women's events ===
| Event | Gold | | Silver | | Bronze | |
|---|---|---|---|---|---|---|
| 50 m freestyle | Gabriela Ņikitina (LAT) | 26.55 | Tess Grossmann (EST) | 27.24 | Katriin Kersa (EST) | 27.66 |
| 100 m freestyle | Gabriela Ņikitina (LAT) | 58.51 | Vaiva Gimbutytė (LTU) | 59.08 | Tess Grossmann (EST) | 59.85 |
| 200 m freestyle | Jūratė Ščerbinskaitė (LTU) | 2:06.75 | Tess Grossmann (EST) | 2:12.14 | Guoda Jonelytė (LTU) | 2:12.82 |
| 400 m freestyle | Maria Romanjuk (EST) | 4:31.33 | Jūratė Ščerbinskaitė (LTU) | 4:31.70 | Guoda Jonelytė (LTU) | 4:42.39 |
| 50 m backstroke | Kätlin Sepp (EST) | 30.23 | Inga Sukytė (LTU) | 31.94 | Valeria Mihhailova (EST) | 32.09 |
| 100 m backstroke | Kätlin Sepp (EST) | 1:03.99 | Inga Sukytė (LTU) | 1:06.35 | Asta Drevinskaitė (LTU) | 1:07.92 |
| 200 m backstroke | Kätlin Sepp (EST) | 2:18.06 | Inga Sukytė (LTU) | 2:08.10 | Asta Drevinskaitė (LTU) | 2:08.60 |
| 50 m breaststroke | Jekaterina Kiseliova (LTU) | 33.08 | Urtė Kazakevičiūtė (LTU) | 33.50 | Maria Harutjunjan (EST) | 34.42 |
| 100 m breaststroke | Jekaterina Kiseliova (LTU) | 1:12.38 | Urtė Kazakevičiūtė (LTU) | 1:12.98 | Aļona Ribakova (LAT) | 1:13.04 |
| 200 m breaststroke | Urtė Kazakevičiūtė (LTU) | 2:37.91 | Aļona Ribakova (LAT) | 2:39.14 | Maria Harutjunjan (EST) | 2:40.44 |
| 50 m butterfly | Gabriela Ņikitina (LAT) | 27.94 | Vaiva Gimbutytė (LTU) | 29.30 | Laura Tolmats (EST) | 29.36 |
| 100 m butterfly | Vaiva Gimbutytė (LTU) | 1:04.48 | Laura Tolmats (EST) | 1:04.88 | Maria Pallas (EST) | 1:05.76 |
| 200 m butterfly | Laura Tolmats (EST) | 2:25.59 | Gerda Pak (EST) | 2:26.17 | Vaiva Gimbutytė (LTU) | 2:31.33 |
| 200 m individual medley | Aļona Ribakova (LAT) | 2:25.92 | Diana Kirs (EST) | 2:28.58 | Erika Bespalko (LTU) | 2:30.42 |
| 400 m individual medley | Maria Romanjuk (EST) | 5:09.11 | Raminta Juodkaitė (LTU) | 5:20.69 | Erika Bespalko (LTU) | 5:20.91 |
| 4×100 m freestyle relay | Latvia | 4:01.13 | Estonia | 4:03.21 | Lithuania | 4:04.24 |
| 4×100 m medley relay | Lithuania | 4:22.21 | Estonia | 4:27.69 | Latvia | 4:31.91 |

== See also ==
- List of Baltic records in swimming
