= Estonia at the 2025 World Aquatics Championships =

- Flag of Estonia
- World Aquatics code: EST
- National federation: Estonian Swimming Federation
- Website: swimming.ee (in Estonian)

in Singapore
- Competitors: 6 in 1 sport
- Medals: Gold 0 Silver 0 Bronze 0 Total 0

World Aquatics Championships appearances
- 1994; 1998; 2001; 2003; 2005; 2007; 2009; 2011; 2013; 2015; 2017; 2019; 2022; 2023; 2024; 2025

Other related appearances
- Soviet Union (1973–1991)

Estonia is competing at the 2025 World Aquatics Championships in Singapore from 11 July to 3 August 2025.

== Competitors ==
The following is the list of competitors in the Championships.

Sport	Men	Women	Total
Swimming	3	3	6
Total	3	3	6

== Swimming ==
Men

Athlete	Event	Heat		Semifinal		Final	
Athlete	Event	Time	Rank	Time	Rank	Time	Rank
Alex Ahtiainen	100 m freestyle	50.71	48	Did not advance			
Alex Ahtiainen	100 m butterfly	53.04	37	Did not advance			
Ralf Tribuntsov	50 m backstroke	24.90	17	Did not advance			
Daniel Zaitsev	50 m freestyle	22.64	46	Did not advance			
Daniel Zaitsev	50 m butterfly	23.44	25	Did not advance			

Women

Athlete	Event	Heat		Semifinal		Final	
Athlete	Event	Time	Rank	Time	Rank	Time	Rank
Eneli Jefimova	50 m breaststroke	30.13	2 Q	30.25	5 Q	30.29	6
Eneli Jefimova	100 m breaststroke	1:06.85	12 Q	1:06.28	10	Did not advance	
Maari Randväli	50 m backstroke	29.53	39	Did not advance			
Maari Randväli	100 m backstroke	1:02.75	32	Did not advance			
Maari Randväli	50 m butterfly	27.32	40	Did not advance			
Maria Romanjuk	200 m breaststroke	2:32.56	28	Did not advance			
