= 2017 Baltic States Swimming Championships =

- Host city: Riga, Latvia
- Date: March 31 – April 1

The 2017 Baltic States Swimming Championships was held in Riga, Latvia, from March 31 – April 1

Some events were also held separately for boys and girls (Baltic States Youth Swimming Meet).

== Medal table ==
=== Senior ===
Host nation (Latvia)

Rank	Nation	Gold	Silver	Bronze	Total
1	Estonia (EST)	17	11	14	42
2	Latvia (LAT)*	9	12	9	30
3	Lithuania (LTU)	8	11	9	28
Totals (3 entries)		34	34	32	100

=== Total ===
Host nation (Latvia)

Rank	Nation	Gold	Silver	Bronze	Total
1	Estonia (EST)	28	22	26	76
2	Lithuania (LTU)	19	18	13	50
3	Latvia (LAT)*	15	22	21	58
Totals (3 entries)		62	62	60	184

== Events ==
- Freestyle: 50 m, 100 m, 200 m, 400 m
- Backstroke: 50 m, 100 m, 200 m
- Breaststroke: 50 m, 100 m, 200 m
- Butterfly: 50 m, 100 m, 200 m
- Individual medley: 200 m, 400 m
- Relay: 4×100 m free, 4×100 m medley

== Results ==
=== Men's events ===
Event	Gold		Silver		Bronze	
50 m freestyle	Pjotr Degtjarjov (EST)	23.01	Darijus Astrauskas (LTU)	23.63	Nikita Tsernosev (EST)	23.71
100 m freestyle	Pjotr Degtjarjov (EST)	50.60	Cevin Anders Siim (EST)	51.54	Andri Aedma (EST)	51.55
200 m freestyle	Kregor Zirk (EST)	1:52.02	Povilas Strazdas (LTU)	1:52.21	Cevin Anders Siim (EST)	1:53.05
400 m freestyle	Deividas Ivanauskas (LTU)	4:14.37	Arvis Aigars (LAT)	4:14.66	Grigorijs Podļesnijs (LAT)	4:14.73
50 m backstroke	Gytis Stankevičius (LTU)	26.26	Endri Vinter (EST)	26.35	Pāvels Vilcāns (LAT)	27.09
100 m backstroke	Ģirts Feldbergs (LAT)	56.25	Gytis Stankevičius (LTU)	56.39	Armin Evert Lelle (EST)	58.27
200 m backstroke	Ģirts Feldbergs (LAT)	2:03.76	Rokas Juozelskis (LTU)	2:05.37	Armin Evert Lelle (EST)	2:06.79
50 m breaststroke	Nikolajs Maskaļenko (LAT)	28.00	Martin Allikvee (EST)	28.57	Martti Aljand (EST)	28.65
100 m breaststroke	Martin Allikvee (EST)	1:02.11	Daniils Bobrovs (LAT)	1:02.46	Nikolajs Maskaļenko (LAT)	1:02.99
200 m breaststroke	Martin Allikvee (EST)	2:13.43	Daniils Bobrovs (LAT)	2:13.85 NR	Silver Hein (EST)	2:19.42
50 m butterfly	Kregor Zirk (EST)	24.66	Daniel Zaitsev (EST)	24.96	Pāvels Vilcāns (LAT)	25.36
100 m butterfly	Daniel Zaitsev (EST)	56.21	Pāvels Kondrahins (LAT)	56.77	Sander Paavo (EST)	57.14
200 m butterfly	Kregor Zirk (EST)	2:05.46	Pāvels Kondrahins (LAT)	2:11.11	Sander Paavo (EST)	2:11.57
200 m individual medley	Povilas Strazdas (LTU)	2:05.23	Silver Hein (EST)	2:09.82	Erikas Kapocius (LTU)	2:10.55
400 m individual medley	Erikas Kapocius (LTU)	4:36.67	Daniils Bobrovs (LAT)	4:39.60	Silver Hein (EST)	4:40.27
4×100 m freestyle relay	Latvia	3:31.18	Estonia	3:31.97	Lithuania	3:33.41
4×100 m medley relay	Estonia	3:24.13	Latvia	3:27.19	Lithuania	3:27.21

=== Women's events ===
Event	Gold		Silver		Bronze	
50 m freestyle	Gabriela Ņikitina (LAT)	26.41	Diana Jarusevičiūtė (LTU)	26.66	Kertu Ly Alnek (EST)	26.72
100 m freestyle	Kertu Ly Alnek (EST)	57.31	Gabriela Ņikitina (LAT)	57.51	Diana Jarusevičiūtė (LTU)	58.57
200 m freestyle	Ilona Maide (EST)	2:08.82	Greta Gataveckaite (LTU)	2:10.22	Agnese Patrīcija Ozola (LAT)	2:10.91
400 m freestyle	Greta Gataveckaite (LTU)	4:36.92	Agnese Patrīcija Ozola (LAT)	4:39.22	Ema Balčiute (LTU)	4:41.49
50 m backstroke	Ieva Maluka (LAT)	30.10	Margaret Markvardt (EST)	30.28	Sigrid Sepp (EST)	30.34
100 m backstroke	Arina Baikova (LAT)	1:03.70	Veronika Olem (EST)	1:04.71	Sigrid Sepp (EST)	1:04.72
200 m backstroke	Veronika Olem (EST)	2:18.56	Sigrid Sepp (EST)	2:19.46	Arina Baikova (LAT)	2:23.50
50 m breaststroke	Maria Romanjuk (EST)	32.04	Agnė Šeleikaitė (LTU)	32.41	Dana Kolidzeja (LAT)	32.66
100 m breaststroke	Maria Romanjuk (EST)	1:09.64	Agne Seleikaite (LTU)	1:12.91	Karleen Kersa (EST)	1:14.77
200 m breaststroke	Maria Romanjuk (EST)	2:31.29	Agne Seleikaite (LTU)	2:42.65	Goda Overlingaite (LTU)	2:44.22
50 m butterfly	Gabriela Ņikitina (LAT)	27.53	Kertu Ly Alnek (EST)	27.84	Diana Jaruseviciute (LTU)	28.07
100 m butterfly	Gabriela Ņikitina (LAT)	1:02.72	Margaret Markvardt (EST)	1:02.97	Dominyka Rapsyte (LTU)	1:05.96
200 m butterfly	Dominyka Rapsyte (LTU)	2:27.60	Jekaterina Troca (LAT)	2:43.18	No more competitors	
200 m individual medley	Margaret Markvardt (EST)	2:21.53	Arina Baikova (LAT)	2:22.66	Erika Martisiute (LTU)	2:26.17
400 m individual medley	Ieva Jaceviciute (LTU)	5:07.08	Erika Martisiute (LTU)	5:16.55	Viktorija Gracova (LAT)	5:22.31
4×100 m freestyle relay	Lithuania	3:57.62	Latvia	3:57.80	Estonia was disqualified	
4×100 m medley relay	Estonia	4:15.09	Lithuania	4:22.11	Latvia	4:23.35
