= Estonia at the 2015 World Aquatics Championships =

- Flag of Estonia
- World Aquatics code: EST
- National federation: Eesti Ujumisliit
- Website: www.swimming.ee

in Kazan, Russia
- Competitors: 10 in 1 sport
- Medals: Gold 0 Silver 0 Bronze 0 Total 0

World Aquatics Championships appearances
- 1994; 1998; 2001; 2003; 2005; 2007; 2009; 2011; 2013; 2015; 2017; 2019; 2022; 2023; 2024; 2025

Other related appearances
- Soviet Union (1973–1991)

Estonia competed at the 2015 World Aquatics Championships in Kazan, Russia from 24 July to 9 August 2015.

== Swimming ==
Estonian swimmers have achieved qualifying standards in the following events (up to a maximum of 2 swimmers in each event at the A-standard entry time, and 1 at the B-standard):

Men

Athlete	Event	Heat		Semifinal		Final	
Athlete	Event	Time	Rank	Time	Rank	Time	Rank
Martti Aljand	50 m breaststroke	28.74	=43	Did not advance			
Martti Aljand	100 m breaststroke	1:01.99	34	Did not advance			
Martin Allikvee	200 m breaststroke	2:15.09 NR	34	Did not advance			
Pjotr Degtjarjov	50 m freestyle	DNS		Did not advance			
Pjotr Degtjarjov	100 m freestyle	DNS		Did not advance			
Martin Liivamägi	200 m individual medley	2:03.21	26	Did not advance			
Ralf Tribuntsov	50 m backstroke	25.45 NR	21	Did not advance			
Ralf Tribuntsov	100 m backstroke	55.13	32	Did not advance			
Ralf Tribuntsov	50 m butterfly	24.28	35	Did not advance			
Ralf Tribuntsov	100 m butterfly	54.38	45	Did not advance			
Ralf Tribuntsov; Kregor Zirk; Martti Aljand; Pjotr Degtjarjov	4×100 m freestyle relay	3:21.55 NR	22	—N/a		Did not advance	
Martti Aljand; Martin Allikvee; Martin Liivamägi; Ralf Tribuntsov	4×100 m medley relay	3:43.15	23	—N/a		Did not advance	

Women

Athlete	Event	Heat		Semifinal		Final	
Athlete	Event	Time	Rank	Time	Rank	Time	Rank
Tess Grossmann	50 m freestyle	26.31	49	Did not advance			
Tess Grossmann	100 m freestyle	57.91	52	Did not advance			
Maria Romanjuk	50 m breaststroke	32.30	40	Did not advance			
Maria Romanjuk	100 m breaststroke	1:09.49 NR	34	Did not advance			
Maria Romanjuk	200 m breaststroke	2:31.37 NR	31	Did not advance			
Sigrid Sepp	50 m backstroke	29.95	36	Did not advance			
