= Estonia at the 2017 World Aquatics Championships =

- Flag of Estonia
- FINA code: EST
- National federation: Eesti Ujumisliit
- Website: www.swimming.ee

in Budapest, Hungary
- Competitors: 8 in 2 sports
- Medals: Gold 0 Silver 0 Bronze 0 Total 0

World Aquatics Championships appearances
- 1994; 1998; 2001; 2003; 2005; 2007; 2009; 2011; 2013; 2015; 2017; 2019; 2022; 2023; 2024

Other related appearances
- Soviet Union (1973–1991)

Estonia is scheduled to compete at the 2017 World Aquatics Championships in Budapest, Hungary from 14 July to 30 July.

== Open water swimming ==
Estonia has entered two open water swimmers

Athlete	Event	Time	Rank
Frank Ojarand	Men's 5 km	1:00:45.2	55
Frank Ojarand	Men's 10 km	2:08:03.0	59
Merle Liivand	Women's 5 km	1:11:25.8	55
Merle Liivand	Women's 10 km	OTL	

== Swimming ==
Estonian swimmers have achieved qualifying standards in the following events (up to a maximum of 2 swimmers in each event at the A-standard entry time, and 1 at the B-standard):

Men

Athlete	Event	Heat		Semifinal		Final	
Athlete	Event	Time	Rank	Time	Rank	Time	Rank
Filipp Provorkov	50 m breaststroke	28.37	41	Did not advance			
Ralf Tribuntsov	50 m backstroke	25.78	34	Did not advance			
Ralf Tribuntsov	100 m backstroke	55.80	=25	Did not advance			
Daniel Zaitsev	50 m freestyle	22.88	=47	Did not advance			
Daniel Zaitsev	50 m butterfly	23.94	25	Did not advance			
Kregor Zirk	100 m freestyle	51.00	=56	Did not advance			
Kregor Zirk	200 m freestyle	1:51.08	49	Did not advance			
Kregor Zirk	100 m butterfly	53.70	43	Did not advance			

Women

Athlete	Event	Heat		Semifinal		Final	
Athlete	Event	Time	Rank	Time	Rank	Time	Rank
Maria Romanjuk	50 m breaststroke	31.92	26	Did not advance			
Maria Romanjuk	100 m breaststroke	1:08.81 NR	=26	Did not advance			
Sigrid Sepp	50 m backstroke	29.24	36	Did not advance			

Mixed

Athlete	Event	Heat		Final	
Athlete	Event	Time	Rank	Time	Rank
Daniel Zaitsev; Kregor Zirk; Maria Romanjuk; Sigrid Sepp	4 × 100 m medley relay	3:55.94	12	Did not advance	
