= Estonia at the 2019 World Aquatics Championships =

- Flag of Estonia
- FINA code: EST
- National federation: Estonian Swimming Federation
- Website: swimming.ee (in Estonian)

in Gwangju, South Korea
- Competitors: 10 in 2 sports

World Aquatics Championships appearances
- 1994; 1998; 2001; 2003; 2005; 2007; 2009; 2011; 2013; 2015; 2017; 2019; 2022; 2023; 2024

Other related appearances
- Soviet Union (1973–1991)

Estonia competed at the 2019 World Aquatics Championships in Gwangju, South Korea from 12 to 28 July.

== Open water swimming ==
Estonia qualified two male and one female open water swimmers.

Men

Athlete	Event	Time	Rank
Sander Paavo	Men's 5 km	1:00:05.8	53
Rinel Pius	Men's 5 km	1:01:51.4	56
Rinel Pius	Men's 10 km	2:09:56.0	72

Women

Athlete	Event	Time	Rank
Merle Liivand	Women's 5 km	1:11:19.5	53.
Merle Liivand	Women's 10 km	2:23:30.8	64

== Swimming ==
Men

Athlete	Event	Heat		Semifinal		Final	
Athlete	Event	Time	Rank	Time	Rank	Time	Rank
Martin Allikvee	50 m breaststroke	27.79 NR	29	Did not advance			
Martin Allikvee	100 m breaststroke	1:00.60	25	Did not advance			
Martin Allikvee	200 m breaststroke	2:10.66	19	Did not advance			
Karl Johann Luht	50 m backstroke	25.97	39	Did not advance			
Karl Johann Luht	100 m backstroke	55.75	38	Did not advance			
Ivan Štšeglov	200 m backstroke	2:01.19 NR	29	Did not advance			
Daniel Zaitsev	50 m freestyle	22.46	28	Did not advance			
Daniel Zaitsev	100 m freestyle	49.44 NR	32	Did not advance			
Daniel Zaitsev	50 m butterfly	23.26 NR	6 Q	23.31	11	Did not advance	
Kregor Zirk	200 m freestyle	1:48.51 NR	26	Did not advance			
Kregor Zirk	400 m freestyle	3:51.30 NR	19	Did not advance			
Kregor Zirk	100 m butterfly	52.92	23	Did not advance			
Kregor Zirk	200 m butterfly	1:58.04 NR	22	Did not advance			

Women

Athlete	Event	Heat		Semifinal		Final	
Athlete	Event	Time	Rank	Time	Rank	Time	Rank
Aleksa Gold	100 m freestyle	56.62	40	Did not advance			
Aleksa Gold	200 m freestyle	2:03.30	33	Did not advance			
Aleksa Gold	200 m backstroke	2:15.24	32	Did not advance			
Maria Romanjuk	50 m breaststroke	31.58	=21	Did not advance			
Maria Romanjuk	100 m breaststroke	1:08.95	26	Did not advance			

Mixed

Athlete	Event	Heat		Final	
Athlete	Event	Time	Rank	Time	Rank
Karl Johann Luht; Maria Romanjuk; Kregor Zirk; Aleksa Gold	4×100 m medley relay	3:54.17 NR	21	Did not advance	
