= Estonia at the 2023 World Aquatics Championships =

- Flag of Estonia
- FINA code: EST
- National federation: Estonian Swimming Federation
- Website: swimming.ee (in Estonian)

in Fukuoka, Japan
- Competitors: 5 in 1 sport

World Aquatics Championships appearances
- 1994; 1998; 2001; 2003; 2005; 2007; 2009; 2011; 2013; 2015; 2017; 2019; 2022; 2023; 2024

Other related appearances
- Soviet Union (1973–1991)

Estonia is set to compete at the 2023 World Aquatics Championships in Fukuoka, Japan from 14 to 30 July.

== Swimming ==
Estonia entered 5 swimmers.

Men

Athlete	Event	Heat		Semifinal		Final	
Athlete	Event	Time	Rank	Time	Rank	Time	Rank
Armin Evert Lelle	100 metre backstroke	57.06	43	Did not advance			
Armin Evert Lelle	200 metre backstroke	2:05.20	33	Did not advance			
Daniel Zaitsev	50 metre freestyle	22.68	47	Did not advance			
Daniel Zaitsev	100 metre freestyle	49.68	40	Did not advance			
Daniel Zaitsev	50 metre butterfly	23.73	30	Did not advance			
Daniel Zaitsev	100 metre butterfly	52.92	34	Did not advance			
Kregor Zirk	200 metre freestyle	1:48.00	28	Did not advance			
Kregor Zirk	400 metre freestyle	3:48.43	16	—		Did not advance	
Kregor Zirk	200 metre butterfly	1:58.69	24	Did not advance			

Women

Athlete	Event	Heat		Semifinal		Final	
Athlete	Event	Time	Rank	Time	Rank	Time	Rank
Aleksa Gold	200 metre backstroke	2:19.47	32	Did not advance			
Eneli Jefimova	50 metre breaststroke	30.39	8 Q	30.22	6	30.48	8
Eneli Jefimova	100 metre breaststroke	1:06.54	9 Q	1:06.18 NR	5 Q	1:06.36	6
Eneli Jefimova	200 metre breaststroke	2:27.60	21	Did not advance			

Mixed

Athlete	Event	Heat		Final	
Athlete	Event	Time	Rank	Time	Rank
Armin Evert Lelle; Eneli Jefimova; Daniel Zaitsev; Aleksa Gold	4 × 100 m medley relay	3:53.50	19	Did not advance	
