= Swimming at the 2016 European Aquatics Championships – Women's 50 metre backstroke =

Women's 50 metre backstroke at the 2016 European Aquatics Championships
- Dates: 20–21 May
- Competitors: 42 from 26 nations
- Winning time: 27.57

Medalists
gold medal	Francesca Halsall	Great Britain
silver medal	Mie Østergaard Nielsen	Denmark
bronze medal	Georgia Davies	Great Britain

The Women's 50 metre backstroke competition of the 2016 European Aquatics Championships was held on 20 and 21 May 2016.

== Records ==
Prior to the competition, the existing world, European and championship records were as follows.

	Name	Nation	Time	Location	Date
World record	Zhao Jing	China	27.06	Rome	30 July 2009
European record	Daniela Samulski	Germany	27.23	Rome	30 July 2009
Championship record	Aleksandra Gerasimenya	Belarus	27.64	Budapest	14 August 2010

== Results ==
=== Heats ===
The heats were held on 20 May at 10:57.

Rank	Heat	Lane	Name	Nationality	Time	Notes
1	3	4	Georgia Davies	Great Britain	27.87	Q
2	5	4	Mie Østergaard Nielsen	Denmark	28.02	Q
3	3	5	Francesca Halsall	Great Britain	28.12	Q
4	4	4	Maaike de Waard	Netherlands	28.17	Q
5	5	3	Mimosa Jallow	Finland	28.31	Q
6	5	1	Kathleen Dawson	Great Britain	28.55	
6	5	7	Katarína Listopadová	Slovakia	28.55	Q
8	3	2	Caroline Pilhatsch	Austria	28.57	Q
8	5	5	Theodora Drakou	Greece	28.57	Q
10	4	5	Elena Gemo	Italy	28.67	Q
11	3	3	Ida Lindborg	Sweden	28.68	Q
12	5	9	Ekaterina Avramova	Turkey	28.70	Q
13	5	6	Sanja Jovanović	Croatia	28.81	Q
14	4	2	Alicja Tchórz	Poland	28.82	Q
15	4	6	Daryna Zevina	Ukraine	28.86	Q
16	5	8	Karolina Hájková	Slovakia	29.01	Q
17	4	1	Carlotta Zofkova	Italy	29.08	Q
18	3	9	Fanny Teijonsalo	Finland	29.17	
19	3	0	Margherita Panziera	Italy	29.21	
20	4	8	Desiree Felner	Austria	29.26	
21	4	3	Sviatlana Khakhlova	Belarus	29.35	
22	3	7	Eygló Ósk Gústafsdóttir	Iceland	29.40	
23	4	7	Camille Gheorghiu	France	29.45	
24	3	8	Harriet Cooper	Great Britain	29.60	
24	2	4	Kristīna Šteins	Latvia	29.60	
26	2	7	Alina Kendzior	Estonia	29.63	
27	4	0	Tereza Grusová	Czech Republic	29.71	
28	2	2	Ema Šarar	Croatia	29.79	
28	4	9	Danielle Hill	Ireland	29.79	
30	2	8	Lotta Nevalainen	Finland	29.84	
31	1	3	Halime Zülal Zeren	Turkey	29.88	
32	2	5	Ana Leite	Portugal	29.98	
33	2	3	Sigrid Sepp	Estonia	29.99	
34	2	0	Ugnė Mažutaitytė	Lithuania	30.00	
35	2	9	Margaret Markvardt	Estonia	30.10	
36	2	6	Hanna-Maria Seppälä	Finland	30.24	
37	1	4	Signhild Joensen	Faroe Islands	30.36	
38	1	2	Kätlin Sepp	Estonia	30.64	
39	2	1	Réka György	Hungary	30.66	
40	1	5	Tatiana Salcutan	Moldova	30.76	
41	1	6	Francisca Azevedo	Portugal	31.00	
42	1	7	Rita Zeqiri	Kosovo	33.57	
	3	1	Kira Toussaint	Netherlands	DNS	
	3	8	Magdalena Kuras	Sweden	DNS	
	5	0	Matea Samardžić	Croatia	DNS	
	5	2	Simona Baumrtová	Czech Republic	DNS	

=== Semifinals ===
The semifinals were held on 20 May at 18:53.

==== Semifinal 1 ====
Rank	Lane	Name	Nationality	Time	Notes
1	4	Mie Østergaard Nielsen	Denmark	27.73	Q
2	5	Maaike de Waard	Netherlands	28.11	Q
3	1	Daryna Zevina	Ukraine	28.32	Q
4	6	Caroline Pilhatsch	Austria	28.51	
5	3	Katarína Listopadová	Slovakia	28.63	
6	2	Ida Lindborg	Sweden	28.75	
7	7	Sanja Jovanović	Croatia	28.85	
8	8	Carlotta Zofkova	Italy	28.92	

==== Semifinal 2 ====
Rank	Lane	Name	Nationality	Time	Notes
1	5	Francesca Halsall	Great Britain	27.80	Q
2	4	Georgia Davies	Great Britain	27.91	Q
3	6	Theodora Drakou	Greece	28.08	Q
4	3	Mimosa Jallow	Finland	28.34	Q
5	7	Ekaterina Avramova	Turkey	28.49	Q
6	1	Alicja Tchórz	Poland	28.93	
7	8	Karolina Hájková	Slovakia	28.94	
	2	Elena Gemo	Italy	DSQ	

=== Final ===
The final was on 21 May at 17:05.

Rank	Lane	Name	Nationality	Time	Notes
1st place, gold medalist(s)	5	Francesca Halsall	Great Britain	27.57	CR
2nd place, silver medalist(s)	4	Mie Østergaard Nielsen	Denmark	27.77	
3rd place, bronze medalist(s)	3	Georgia Davies	Great Britain	27.87	
4	6	Theodora Drakou	Greece	28.00	
5	2	Maaike de Waard	Netherlands	28.14	
6	1	Mimosa Jallow	Finland	28.15	
7	8	Ekaterina Avramova	Turkey	28.60	
8	7	Daryna Zevina	Ukraine	28.61	
