= Estonia at the 2022 World Aquatics Championships =

- Flag of Estonia
- FINA code: EST
- National federation: Estonian Swimming Federation
- Website: www.swimming.ee

in Budapest, Hungary
- Competitors: 7 (5 men and 2 women) in 2 sports
- Medals: Gold 0 Silver 0 Bronze 0 Total 0

World Aquatics Championships appearances
- 1994; 1998; 2001; 2003; 2005; 2007; 2009; 2011; 2013; 2015; 2017; 2019; 2022; 2023; 2024

Other related appearances
- Soviet Union (1973–1991)

Estonia competed at the 2022 World Aquatics Championships in Budapest, Hungary from 18 June to 3 July.

== Open water swimming ==
Men

| Athlete | Event | Time | Rank |
|---|---|---|---|
| Anton Theo Girlin | 5 km | 1:04:57.1 | 50 |

== Swimming ==
Men

| Athlete | Event | Heat | | Semifinal | | Final | |
| Athlete | Event | Time | Rank | Time | Rank | Time | Rank |
|---|---|---|---|---|---|---|---|
| Alex Ahtiainen | 100 m butterfly | 52.86 | 28 | Did not advance | | | |
| Armin Evert Lelle | 100 m backstroke | 55.82 | 30 | Did not advance | | | |
| Armin Evert Lelle | 200 m backstroke | 2:03.58 | 25 | Did not advance | | | |
| Daniel Zaitsev | 50 m freestyle | 22.45 | 25 | Did not advance | | | |
| Daniel Zaitsev | 100 m freestyle | 49.56 | 34 | Did not advance | | | |
| Daniel Zaitsev | 50 m backstroke | 26.01 | 28 | Did not advance | | | |
| Daniel Zaitsev | 50 m butterfly | 23.38 | 12 Q | 23.38 | 15 | Did not advance | |
| Kregor Zirk | 400 m freestyle | 3:50.62 | 20 | — | | Did not advance | |
| Kregor Zirk | 200 m butterfly | 1:56.13 NR | 9 Q | 1:55.62 NR | 11 | Did not advance | |

Women

| Athlete | Event | Heat | | Semifinal | | Final | |
| Athlete | Event | Time | Rank | Time | Rank | Time | Rank |
|---|---|---|---|---|---|---|---|
| Aleksa Gold | 100 m freestyle | 56.19 | 25 | Did not advance | | | |
| Aleksa Gold | 200 m freestyle | 2:03.46 | 28 | Did not advance | | | |
| Aleksa Gold | 100 m backstroke | 1:03.95 | 29 | Did not advance | | | |
| Aleksa Gold | 200 m backstroke | 2:14.02 | 15 Q | 2:14.14 | 15 | Did not advance | |
| Eneli Jefimova | 50 m breaststroke | 30.08 NR | 3 Q | 30.24 | 5 Q | 30.25 | 6 |
| Eneli Jefimova | 100 m breaststroke | 1:07.09 | 13 Q | 1:06.48 | 9 | Did not advance | |
| Eneli Jefimova | 200 m breaststroke | 2:28.51 | 19 | Did not advance | | | |

Mixed

| Athlete | Event | Heat | | Final | |
| Athlete | Event | Time | Rank | Time | Rank |
|---|---|---|---|---|---|
| Armin Evert Lelle; Eneli Jefimova; Alex Ahtiainen; Aleksa Gold | 4 × 100 metre medley relay | - | DSQ | Did not advance | |
