= Estonia at the 2024 World Aquatics Championships =

- Flag of Estonia
- FINA code: EST
- National federation: Estonian Swimming Federation
- Website: swimming.ee (in Estonian)

in Doha, Qatar
- Competitors: 2 in 2 sports
- Medals: Gold 0 Silver 0 Bronze 0 Total 0

World Aquatics Championships appearances
- 1994; 1998; 2001; 2003; 2005; 2007; 2009; 2011; 2013; 2015; 2017; 2019; 2022; 2023; 2024

Other related appearances
- Soviet Union (1973–1991)

Estonia competed at the 2024 World Aquatics Championships in Doha, Qatar from 2 to 18 February.

== Competitors ==
The following is the list of competitors in the Championships.

Sport	Men	Women	Total
Open water swimming	1	0	1
Swimming	1	0	1
Total	2	0	2

== Open water swimming ==
Men

Athlete	Event	Time	Rank
Jaan Pasko	Men's 10 km	1:54:05.3	50

== Swimming ==
Estonia entered 1 swimmers.

Men

Athlete	Event	Heat		Semifinal		Final	
Athlete	Event	Time	Rank	Time	Rank	Time	Rank
Kregor Zirk	100 metre freestyle	Did not start		Did not advance			
Kregor Zirk	200 metre freestyle	1:47.54	20	Did not advance			
Kregor Zirk	400 metre freestyle	3:49.34	22	—		Did not advance	
Kregor Zirk	200 metre butterfly	1:55.58 NR	1 Q	1:55.64	5 Q	1:55.48 NR	5
