= Estonia at the 2011 World Aquatics Championships =

- Flag of Estonia
- World Aquatics code: EST
- National federation: Eesti Ujumisliit
- Website: www.swimming.ee

in Shanghai, China
- Competitors: 6 in 1 sports
- Medals: Gold 0 Silver 0 Bronze 0 Total 0

World Aquatics Championships appearances
- 1994; 1998; 2001; 2003; 2005; 2007; 2009; 2011; 2013; 2015; 2017; 2019; 2022; 2023; 2024; 2025

Other related appearances
- Soviet Union (1973–1991)

Estonia competed at the 2011 World Aquatics Championships in Shanghai, China between July 16 and 31, 2011.

== Swimming ==
Estonia qualified 6 swimmers.

Men

Athlete	Event	Heats		Semifinals		Final	
Athlete	Event	Time	Rank	Time	Rank	Time	Rank
Pavel Naroshkin	800m freestyle	8:44.06	50			Did not advance	
Filipp Provorkov	50m breaststroke	28.39	29	Did not advance			
Martti Aljand	100m breaststroke	1:02.78	54	Did not advance			
Martti Aljand	200m breaststroke	2:18.65	39	Did not advance			
Martin Liivamägi	200m individual medley	2:01.88	26	Did not advance			

Women

Athlete	Event	Heats		Semifinals		Final	
Athlete	Event	Time	Rank	Time	Rank	Time	Rank
Triin Aljand	50m freestyle	25.41	17 Q*	25.57	16	Did not advance	
Triin Aljand	50m butterfly	26.43	10 Q	26.48	12	Did not advance	
Triin Aljand	100m butterfly	59.78	26	Did not advance			
Jane Trepp	50m breaststroke	32.00	16 Q	32.33	16	Did not advance	

- * qualified due to the withdrawal of another swimmer
