= Andres Olvik =

Estonian swimmer

Personal information
- National team: Estonia
- Born: 16 April 1986 (age 40) Tallinn, then part of Estonian SSR, Soviet Union
- Height: 1.94 m (6 ft 4 in)
- Weight: 89 kg (196 lb)

Sport
- Sport: Swimming
- Strokes: Backstroke
- Club: Kalevi Ujumiskool
Medal record
Men's swimming
Representing Estonia
Baltic Championships
Gold medal – first place	2011 Riga	100 m backstroke
Gold medal – first place	2011 Riga	200 m backstroke

Andres Olvik (born 16 April 1986) is an Estonian swimmer, who specialized in backstroke events. He represented his nation Estonia at the 2008 Summer Olympics, and has won two gold medals in a backstroke double (100 and 200 m) at the 2011 Baltic Championships in Riga, Latvia. Apart from his medal treasury, he also set a long-course Estonian record in the 200 m backstroke (2:02.67) at the 2012 European Championships in Debrecen, Hungary. Olvik currently trains for the Estonian national team, while coaching numerous age groups at Kalev Swim School in Tallinn.

Olvik competed for the Estonian team in the men's 200 m backstroke at the 2008 Summer Olympics in Beijing. Leading up to the Games, he raced his way to the top of the field with a solid 2:03.12 to crush the Estonian record and comfortably register under the FINA B-cut (2:03.90) by about eight tenths of a second at the Baltic State Multi-Nations Meet in Riga, Latvia. Rallying from fifth at the 150-metre turn in heat two, Olvik tried to maintain his pace towards the final stretch, until the host nation China's Deng Jian made a late surge by more than half a second to edge him out to sixth with a 2:03.66. Olvik failed to advance to the semifinals, as he placed fortieth overall in the prelims.

== See also ==
- List of Estonian records in swimming
