= Swimming at the 2016 European Aquatics Championships – Mixed 4 × 100 metre freestyle relay =

Mixed 4 × 100 metre freestyle relay at the 2016 European Aquatics Championships
- Dates: 20 May
- Competitors: 52 from 10 nations
- Teams: 10
- Winning time: 3:23.64

Medalists
gold medal	Sebastiaan Verschuren; Ben Schwietert; Maud van der Meer; Ranomi Kromowidjojo; Kyle Stolk; Marrit Steenbergen	Netherlands
silver medal	Filippo Magnini; Luca Dotto; Erika Ferraioli; Federica Pellegrini; Luca Leonardi; Jonathan Boffa; Aglaia Pezzato	Italy
bronze medal	Clément Mignon; Jérémy Stravius; Charlotte Bonnet; Anna Santamans; Lorys Bourelly; Frederick Bousquet; Camille Georghiu; Margaux Fabre	France

The Mixed 4 × 100 metre freestyle relay competition of the 2016 European Aquatics Championships was held on 20 May 2016.

== Records ==
Prior to the competition, the existing world, European and championship records were as follows.

	Nation	Time	Location	Date
World record	United States	3:23.05	Kazan	8 August 2015
European record	Netherlands	3:23.10	Kazan	8 August 2015
Championship record	Italy	3:25.02	Berlin	22 August 2014

== Results ==
=== Heats ===
The heats were held at 11:18.

Rank	Heat	Lane	Nation	Swimmers	Time	Notes
1	1	3	Netherlands	Ben Schwietert (49.38); Kyle Stolk (49.04); Marrit Steenbergen (54.60); Maud van der Meer (53.87)	3:26.89	Q
2	1	1	Italy	Luca Leonardi (49.30); Jonathan Boffa (49.21); Aglaia Pezzato (55.00); Erika Ferraioli (55.05)	3:28.56	Q
3	2	1	Sweden	Isak Eliasson (49.34); Christoffer Carlsen (49.22); Louise Hansson (55.07); Natalie Lindborg (56.24)	3:29.87	Q
4	2	5	France	Lorys Bourelly (50.26); Frederick Bousquet (49.28); Camille Georghiu (55.41); Margaux Fabre (55.47)	3:30.42	Q
5	2	2	Turkey	Doğa Çelik (49.53); Kemal Arda Gürdal (49.72); İlknur Nihan Çakıcı (55.88); Ekaterina Avramova (55.38)	3:30.51	Q
6	1	5	Hungary	Dominik Kozma (49.35); Krisztián Takács (49.62); Dalma Sebestyén (56.91); Zsuzsanna Jakabos (55.77)	3:31.65	Q
7	1	4	Norway	Markus Lie (50.60); Truls Wigdel (51.64); Susann Bjørnsen (55.82); Marte Løvberg (55.72)	3:33.78	Q
8	1	6	Estonia	Pjotr Degtjarjov (50.24); Karl Luht (50.11); Margaret Markvardt (57.82); Alina Kendzior (58.09)	3:36.26	Q
9	2	4	Moldova	Alexei Sancov (50.83); Pavel Izbisciuc (53.15); Tatiana Perstniova (1:01.49); Tatiana Salcutan (1:01.33)	3:46.80	
10	2	6	San Marino	Davide Bernardi (53.39); Christian Santi (54.95); Elisa Bernardi (59.81); Martina Cecciaroni (59.33)	3:47.48	
	1	2	Finland	DNS		
	1	7	Bosnia and Herzegovina	DNS		
	2	3	Switzerland	DNS		
	2	7	Poland	DNS		

=== Final ===
The final was held at 19:39.

Rank	Lane	Nation	Swimmers	Time	Notes
1st place, gold medalist(s)	4	Netherlands	Sebastiaan Verschuren (48.64); Ben Schwietert (49.03); Maud van der Meer (53.70); Ranomi Kromowidjojo (52.27)	3:23.64	CR
2nd place, silver medalist(s)	5	Italy	Filippo Magnini (49.35); Luca Dotto (47.94); Erika Ferraioli (54.35); Federica Pellegrini (52.91)	3:24.55	
3rd place, bronze medalist(s)	6	France	Clément Mignon (49.26); Jérémy Stravius (48.29); Charlotte Bonnet (53.44); Anna Santamans (54.50)	3:25.49	
4	3	Sweden	Isak Eliasson (49.31); Christoffer Carlsen (48.74); Ida Lindborg (54.45); Louise Hansson (54.76)	3:27.26	
5	7	Hungary	Richárd Bohus (49.35); Dominik Kozma (48.52); Dalma Sebestyén (56.44); Ajna Késely (55.30)	3:29.61	
6	2	Turkey	Kemal Arda Gürdal (50.27); Doğa Çelik (49.07); İlknur Nihan Çakıcı (55.73); Ekaterina Avramova (56.00)	3:31.07	
7	1	Norway	Markus Lie (50.62); Truls Wigdel (51.64); Susann Bjørnsen (55.63); Marte Løvberg (55.43)	3:33.32	
8	8	Estonia	Karl Luht (51.08); Pjotr Degtjarjov (50.00); Margaret Markvardt (57.58); Alina Kendzior (56.87)	3:35.53	
