= Estonia at the 2013 World Aquatics Championships =

- Flag of Estonia
- FINA code: EST
- National federation: Eesti Ujumisliit
- Website: www.swimming.ee

in Barcelona, Spain
- Competitors: 3 in 1 sports
- Medals Ranked -th: Gold 0 Silver 0 Bronze 0 Total 0

World Aquatics Championships appearances
- 1994; 1998; 2001; 2003; 2005; 2007; 2009; 2011; 2013; 2015; 2017; 2019; 2022; 2023; 2024

Other related appearances
- Soviet Union (1973–1991)

Estonia competed at the 2013 World Aquatics Championships in Barcelona, Spain from 19 July to 4 August 2013.

== Swimming ==
Estonian swimmers achieved qualifying standards in the following events (up to a maximum of 2 swimmers in each event at the A-standard entry time, and 1 at the B-standard):

Men

Athlete	Event	Heat		Semifinal		Final	
Athlete	Event	Time	Rank	Time	Rank	Time	Rank
Pjotr Degtjarjov	50 m freestyle	22.84	32	Did not advance			
Pjotr Degtjarjov	100 m freestyle	50.28	35	Did not advance			
Martin Liivamägi	50 m breaststroke	28.82	48	Did not advance			
Martin Liivamägi	100 m breaststroke	1:02.41	40	Did not advance			

Women

Athlete	Event	Heat		Semifinal		Final	
Athlete	Event	Time	Rank	Time	Rank	Time	Rank
Maria Romanjuk	50 m breaststroke	33.56	54	Did not advance			
Maria Romanjuk	200 m breaststroke	2:33.48	28	Did not advance			
