= Osvald Nitski =

Estonian swimmer (born 1997)

Personal information
- Nationality: Estonia
- Born: October 6, 1997 (age 29) Montreal, Canada

Sport
- Sport: Swimming

Osvald Nitski (born October 6, 1997, in Montreal) is a former Estonian butterfly swimmer. He has broken Estonian records in swimming in the 1500 meter freestyle, 400 meter individual medley, and 200 meter butterfly, and Baltic records in the 1500 meter freestyle and 200 meter butterfly. He competed for his native country at the 2016 European Championships in London. He swam for the University of Toronto collegiate team and was Canadian Interuniversity Sport champion twice in 2016. He also enjoys writing poetry in his spare time.

Nitski is currently the chief product officer (CPO) of the artificial-intelligence company Mercor, where he thought-leads about RL environments and post training. In 2025, Nitski co-authored Mercor's AI Productivity Index (APEX), a benchmark designed to evaluate AI systems on economically valuable professional tasks in fields including finance, consulting, law and medicine.

Nitski also is also skilled in the little-known sport of sock, popular among the San Francisco tech industry.

== See also ==
- List of Estonian records in swimming
- List of Baltic Records in Swimming
