= List of Estonian records in swimming =

The Estonian records in swimming are the fastest ever performances of swimmers from Estonia, which are recognised and ratified by the Estonian Swimming Federation (Eesti Ujumisliit).

== Long Course (50 m) ==
=== Men ===
Event	Time		Name	Club	Date	Meet	Location	Ref
50 m freestyle	21.91	sf	Ralf Tribuntsov	Estonia	15 August 2026	European Championships	Paris, France	
100 m freestyle	49.37		Ralf Tribuntsov	SK Garant	15 May 2026	Estonian Championships	Tartu, Estonia	
200 m freestyle	1:46.10	h	Kregor Zirk	Estonia	25 July 2021	Olympic Games	Tokyo, Japan	
400 m freestyle	3:47.05	h	Kregor Zirk	Estonia	24 July 2021	Olympic Games	Tokyo, Japan	
800 m freestyle	7:57.88		Kregor Zirk	Estonia	2 June 2021	Mare Nostrum	Canet-en-Roussillon, France	
1500 m freestyle	15:45.35		Mark Iltsisin	Kalevi Ujumiskool	15 May 2026	Estonian Championships	Tartu, Estonia	
50m backstroke	24.66	h	Ralf Tribuntsov	Estonia	13 August 2026	European Championships	Paris, France	
100m backstroke	55.03	rh	Ralf Tribuntsov	Estonia	9 August 2015	World Championships	Kazan, Russia	
200m backstroke	2:01.19	h	Ivan Štšeglov	Estonia	25 July 2019	World Championships	Gwangju, South Korea	
50m breaststroke	27.70	h	Christopher Palvadre	Estonia	14 August 2026	European Championships	Paris, France	
100m breaststroke	1:00.47		Martin Allikvee	SK Garant	26 June 2019	Budapest Open Championships	Budapest, Hungary	
200m breaststroke	2:10.63		Martin Allikvee	SK Garant	28 June 2019	Budapest Open Championships	Budapest, Hungary	
50m butterfly	22.92	sf	Ralf Tribuntsov	Estonia	10 August 2026	European Championships	Paris, France	
100m butterfly	52.18		Alex Ahtiainen	SK Garant	21 April 2023	Bergen Swim Festival	Bergen, Norway	
200m butterfly	1:54.22	sf	Kregor Zirk	Estonia	30 July 2024	Olympic Games	Paris, France	
200m individual medley	1:59.95	h	Martin Liivamägi	Estonia	29 July 2009	World Championships	Rome, Italy	
400m individual medley	4:23.90		Osvald Nitski	Toronto	26 February 2016	Speedo CIS Championships	Quebec, Canada	
4×50m freestyle relay	1:31.96		Ralf Tribuntsov (23.51); Henri Reinsalu (23.21); Martti Aljand (22.84); Pjotr Degtjarjov (22.40)	Audentese SK	17 June 2016	Estonian Championships	Tartu, Estonia	
4×100m freestyle relay	3:19.13	h	Lars Kuljus (49.49); Kregor Zirk (49.70); Daniel Zaitsev (49.87); Alex Ahtiainen (50.07)	Estonia	20 June 2024	European Championships	Belgrade, Serbia	
4×200m freestyle relay	7:33.18	h	Kregor Zirk (1:51.27); Andri Aedma (1:54.43); Karl Johann Luht (1:54.55); Martin Liivamägi (1:52.93)	Estonia	21 May 2016	European Championships	London, United Kingdom	
4×50m medley relay	1:41.10		Ralf Tribuntsov (25.84); Martti Aljand (28.14); Priit Aavik (24.57); Pjotr Degtjarjov (22.55)	Audentese SK	18 June 2016	Estonian Championships	Tartu, Estonia	
4×100m medley relay	3:37.76	h	Armin Evert Lelle (55.21); Martin Allikvee (1:01.81); Alex Ahtiainen (52.43); Daniel Zaitsev (48.31)	Estonia	23 May 2021	European Championships	Budapest, Hungary	

Legend: # – Record awaiting ratification by Estonian Swimming Federation; WR – World record; ER – European record; e – equalled existing record;
Records not set in finals: h – heat; sf – semifinal; r – relay 1st leg; rh – relay heat 1st leg; b – B final; † – en route to final mark; so – swim-off; tt – time trial

=== Women ===
Event	Time		Name	Club	Date	Meet	Location	Ref
50m freestyle	25.01		Triin Aljand	Estonia	27 May 2012	European Championships	Debrecen, Hungary	
100m freestyle	55.18	sf	Aleksa Gold	Estonia	17 June 2024	European Championships	Belgrade, Serbia	
200m freestyle	2:00.64	h	Elina Partõka	Estonia	11 August 2008	Olympic Games	Beijing, China	
400m freestyle	4:15.46		Aivi Liiv-Kiil	Tallinna Tööjõureservid	16 January 1984	-	Moscow, Soviet Union	
800m freestyle	8:46.32		Aivi Liiv-Kiil	Tallinna Tööjõureservid	18 January 1984	-	Moscow, Soviet Union	
1500m freestyle	17:12.26		Kirke Mõtsnik	SG Stadtwerke München	24 April 2026	German Championships	Berlin, Germany	
50m backstroke	28.73		Maari Randväli	Kalevi US	23 May 2026	AP Race London International	London, United Kingdom	
100m backstroke	1:01.49	rh	Maari Randväli	Estonia	11 August 2026	European Championships	Paris, France	
200m backstroke	2:11.70		Aleksa Gold	Kalevi Ujumiskool	27 June 2021	Borac Telegroup Grand Challenge	Banja Luka, Bosnia and Herzegovina	
50m breaststroke	29.83		Eneli Jefimova	Kalevi Ujumiskool	21 April 2025	Helsinki Swim Meet	Helsinki, Finland	
100m breaststroke	1:05.78	sf	Eneli Jefimova	Estonia	11 August 2026	European Championships	Paris, France	
200m breaststroke	2:25.59		Eneli Jefimova	Kalevi Ujumiskool	24 May 2025	AP Race London International	London, United Kingdom	
50m butterfly	25.92		Triin Aljand	Estonia	22 May 2012	European Championships	Debrecen, Hungary	
100m butterfly	59.00	h	Triin Aljand	Estonia	26 July 2009	World Championships	Rome, Italy	
200m butterfly	2:16.61		Anna-Liisa Põld	Keila SC	11 July 2010	USA Swimming Sectionals	Gainesville, United States	
200m individual medley	2:17.78	h	Maria Romanjuk	Estonia	21 May 2021	European Championships	Budapest, Hungary	
400m individual medley	4:52.00		Aleksa Gold	University of Toronto	24 February 2023	U Sports Championships	Victoria, Canada	
4×50m freestyle relay	1:47.63		Kätlin Sepp (27.51); Margaret Markvardt (26.07); Katriin Kersa (27.18); Karleen Kersa (26.87)	TOP	17 June 2016	Estonian Championships	Tallinn, Estonia	
4×100m freestyle relay	3:47.45	h	Jana Kolukanova (56.84); Triin Aljand (57.01); Maria Albert (56.54); Elina Partõka (57.06)	Estonia	25 March 2007	World Championships	Melbourne, Australia	
4×200m freestyle relay	8:29.10		Elina Partõka; Annika Saarnak; Jane Trepp; Maria Albert	Clubs team	1 July 2008	Estonian Championships	Tartu, Estonia	
4×50m medley relay	1:57.05		Sigrid Sepp (29.89); Karleen Kersa (32.16); Margaret Markvardt (28.10); Kätlin Sepp (26.90)	TOP	18 June 2017	Estonian Championships	Tartu, Estonia	
4×100m medley relay	4:11.01		Polina Sovtsa (1:05.23); Egle Salu (1:07.91); Emily-Pärli Jäärats (1:00.79); Ksenia Bažanova (57.08)	Estonia	8 March 2026	Baltic States Championships	Riga, Latvia	

Legend: # – Record awaiting ratification by Estonian Swimming Federation; WR – World record; ER – European record; e – equalled existing record;
Records not set in finals: h – heat; sf – semifinal; r – relay 1st leg; rh – relay heat 1st leg; b – B final; † – en route to final mark; so – swim-off; tt – time trial

=== Mixed relay ===
Event	Time		Name	Nationality	Date	Meet	Location	Ref
4×100 m freestyle relay	3:35.53		Karl Johann Luht (51.08); Pjotr Degtjarjov (50.00); Margaret Markvardt (57.58); Alina Kendzior (56.87)	Estonia	20 May 2016	European Championships	London, Great Britain	
4×100 m medley relay	3:50.94	h	Armin Evert Lelle (55.88); Eneli Jefimova (1:07.44); Alex Ahtiainen (52.72); Aleksa Gold (54.90)	Estonia	20 May 2021	European Championships	Budapest, Hungary	

Legend: # – Record awaiting ratification by Estonian Swimming Federation; WR – World record; ER – European record; e – equalled existing record;
Records not set in finals: h – heat; so – swim-off

== Short Course (25 m) ==
=== Men ===
Event	Time		Name	Club	Date	Meet	Location	Ref
50m freestyle	20.77	rh	Ralf Tribuntsov	Estonia	2 December 2025	European Championships	Lublin, Poland	
100m freestyle	47.08	h	Daniel Zaitsev	Estonia	20 December 2021	World Championships	Abu Dhabi, United Arab Emirates	
200m freestyle	1:42.97		Kregor Zirk	Energy Standard	4 December 2021	International Swimming League	Eindhoven, Netherlands	
400m freestyle	3:40.60		Kregor Zirk	Estonia	31 October 2024	World Cup	Singapore, Singapore	
800m freestyle	7:44.19		Kregor Zirk	Estonia	26 October 2024	World Cup	Incheon, South Korea	
1500m freestyle	14:54.47		Kregor Zirk	Estonia	19 October 2024	World Cup	Shanghai, China	
50m backstroke	22.63	sf	Ralf Tribuntsov	Estonia	6 December 2025	European Championships	Lublin, Poland	
100m backstroke	49.88		Ralf Tribuntsov	Estonia	15 October 2026	World Cup	Astana, Kazakhstan	
200m backstroke	1:51.20		Armin Evert Lelle	Estonia	21 December 2021	World Championships	Abu Dhabi, United Arab Emirates	
50m breaststroke	26.68	sf	Martin Allikvee	Estonia	4 December 2019	European Championships	Glasgow, Great Britain	
100m breaststroke	57.51		Martti Aljand	Estonia	9 December 2011	European Championships	Szczecin, Poland	
200m breaststroke	2:04.78	h	Martin Allikvee	Estonia	5 December 2019	European Championships	Glasgow, Great Britain	
50m butterfly	22.06	sf	Daniel Zaitsev	Estonia	2 December 2025	European Championships	Lublin, Poland	
100m butterfly	50.48	sf	Daniel Zaitsev	Estonia	17 December 2022	World Championships	Melbourne, Australia	
200m butterfly	1:50.39	h	Kregor Zirk	Estonia	12 December 2024	World Championships	Budapest, Hungary	
100m individual medley	52.20	h	Ralf Tribuntsov	Spordiklubi Garant	15 November 2025	Estonian Junior Championships	Kohtla-Järve, Estonia	
100m individual medley	51.54	#	Ralf Tribuntsov	Estonia	6 November 2026	Memoriał Marka Petrusewicza	Wrocław, Poland	
200m individual medley	1:55.64		Martin Liivamägi	Kalevi Ujumiskool	17 December 2016	Estonian Championships	Tallinn, Estonia	
400m individual medley	4:12.15	h	Martin Liivamägi	Estonia	11 December 2009	European Championships	Istanbul, Turkey	
4×50m freestyle relay	1:25.03	h	Ralf Tribuntsov (20.77); Daniel Zaitsev (21.02); Kregor Zirk (21.54); Siim Keskula (21.70)	Estonia	2 December 2025	European Championships	Lublin, Poland	
4×100m freestyle relay	3:13.56		Ralf Tribuntsov (48.03); Georg Filippov (49.09); Marko-Matteus Langel (47.92); Cevin Anders Siim (48.52)	Kalevi Ujumiskool	26 November 2022	Estonian Championships	Kohtla-Järve, Estonia	
4×200m freestyle relay	7:10.56		Cevin Anders Siim (1:48.94); Kregor Zirk (1:44.67); Kaspar Helde (1:47.73); Marko-Matteus Langel (1:49.22)	Estonia	22 December 2020	Estonian Championships	Tallinn, Estonia	
4×50m medley relay	1:34.72		Ralf Tribuntsov (23.73); Martin Liivamägi (26.89); Daniel Zaitsev (23.06); Pjotr Degtjarjov (21.04)	Estonia	6 December 2015	European Championships	Netanya, Israel	
4×100m medley relay	3:32.80		Alan Smok (53.94); Alan Gritsok (1:00.63); Alex Ahtiainen (51.15); Daniel Zaitsev (47.08)	SK Garant	12 July 2024	Estonian Championships	Kohtla-Järve, Estonia	

Legend: # – Record awaiting ratification by Estonian Swimming Federation; WR – World record; ER – European record; e – equalled existing record;
Records not set in finals: h – heat; sf – semifinal; r – relay 1st leg; rh – relay heat 1st leg; b – B final; † – en route to final mark; so – swim-off; tt – time trial

=== Women ===
Event	Time		Name	Club	Date	Meet	Location	Ref
50 m freestyle	23.92	sf	Triin Aljand	Estonia	13 December 2009	European Championships	Istanbul, Turkey	
100 m freestyle	53.87		Aleksa Gold	University of Toronto	26 March 2022	U SPORTS Championships	Quebec City, Canada	
200 m freestyle	1:57.96		Aleksa Gold	University of Toronto	24 March 2022	U SPORTS Championships	Quebec City, Canada	
400 m freestyle	4:14.40		Aivi Liiv-Kiil	Tallinna Tööjõureservid	11 February 1984	-	Bonn, Germany	
800 m freestyle	8:43.45		Jelena Petrova	SK Garant	22 November 2005	Estonian Championships	Keila, Estonia	
1500 m freestyle	16:47.30		Kirke Mõtsnik	TOP	19 December 2025	Estonian Championships	Tallinn, Estonia	
50m backstroke	27.54		Maari Randväli	Mount Kelly	13 December 2025	Swim England National Winter Championships	Sheffield, Great Britain	
100m backstroke	58.72		Maari Randväli	Mount Kelly	12 December 2025	Swim England National Winter Championships	Sheffield, Great Britain	
200m backstroke	2:08.77		Aleksa Gold	University of Toronto	3 December 2021	UT vs Guelph Dual Meet	Toronto, Canada	
50m breaststroke	28.81		Eneli Jefimova	Estonia	7 December 2025	European Championships	Lublin, Poland	
100m breaststroke	1:02.82		Eneli Jefimova	Estonia	3 December 2025	European Championships	Lublin, Poland	
200m breaststroke	2:19.23		Eneli Jefimova	Kalevi Ujumiskool	19 November 2023	Kalev Open	Tallinn, Estonia	
50m butterfly	25.44		Triin Aljand	Estonia	11 December 2009	European Championships	Istanbul, Turkey	
100m butterfly	58.13	h	Triin Aljand	Estonia	13 November 2008	European Championships	Rijeka, Croatia	
200m butterfly	2:13.56		Maari Randväli	Kalevi Ujumiskool	20 December 2025	Estonian Championships	Tallinn, Estonia	
100m individual medley	59.33	h	Jane Trepp	Estonia	11 December 2009	European Championships	Istanbul, Turkey	
200m individual medley	2:12.19		Maria Romanjuk	Spordiklubi Garant	13 July 2021	Estonian Championships	Tallinn, Estonia	
400m individual medley	4:38.88		Aleksa Gold	University of Toronto	24 March 2022	U SPORTS Championships	Quebec City, Canada	
4×50m freestyle relay	1:41.64		Triin Aljand; Kätlin Sepp; Tess Grossmann; Annika Saarnak	TOP	21 December 2012	Estonian Championships	Tallinn, Estonia	
4×100m freestyle relay	3:44.71		Egle Salu (57.47); Inessa Sorokin (57.43); Maari Randväli (54.09); Anete Bollverk (55.72)	Kalevi Ujumiskool	20 December 2025	Estonian Championships	Tallinn, Estonia	
4×200m freestyle relay	8:17.07		Maari Randväli (2:01.71); Sheril Tankler (2:05.14); Kirke Mõtsnik (2:03.70); Kirke Madar (2:06.52)	Estonia	1 December 2024	Nordic Championships	Vejle, Denmark	
4×50m medley relay	1:49.33	h	Maria Romanjuk (28.62); Eneli Jefimova (29.50); Mariangela Boitsuk (26.11); Aleksa Gold (25.10)	Estonia	7 December 2023	European Championships	Otopeni, Romania	
4×100m medley relay	4:05.15		Polina Sovtsa (1:03.12); Egle Salu (1:06.73); Kirke Madar (1:00.67); Maari Randväli (54.63)	Estonia	2 December 2024	Nordic Championships	Vejle, Denmark	

Legend: # – Record awaiting ratification by Estonian Swimming Federation; WR – World record; ER – European record; e – equalled existing record;
Records not set in finals: h – heat; sf – semifinal; r – relay 1st leg; rh – relay heat 1st leg; b – B final; † – en route to final mark; so – swim-off; tt – time trial

=== Mixed relay ===
Event	Time	Name	Nationality	Date	Meet	Location	Ref
4×50 m freestyle relay	1:34.03	Cevin Anders Siim (22.55); Ralf Tribuntsov (21.11); Anete Bollverk (25.18); Mariangela Boitšuk (25.19)	Kalevi Ujumiskool	11 July 2024	Estonian Championships	Kohtla-Järve, Estonia	
4×50 m medley relay	1:38.79	Ralf Tribuntsov (22.96); Eneli Jefimova (28.80); Daniel Zaitsev (21.78); Egle Salu (25.25)	Estonia	3 December 2025	European Championships	Lublin, Poland	

Legend: # – Record awaiting ratification by Estonian Swimming Federation; e – equalled existing record;
Records not set in finals: h – heat; so – swim-off

== See also ==
- List of Baltic records in swimming
