= Baltic States Swimming Championships =

The Baltic States Swimming Championships is an annual swimming competition between best swimmers from Baltic states: Lithuania, Latvia and Estonia.

The championships are typically held over two days early in the year and serve as a key stepping stone for many athletes on their journey to international competition.

== Team scoring ==
=== Youth and Junior age group ===
In 2023, two (2) fastest swimmers from each country in each gender and age group bring points for their team in individual events as follows: 1st place – 7 points, 2nd – 5 points, 3rd – 4 points, 4th – 3 points, 5th – 2 points, 6th – 1 point. The fastest relay team from each country in each gender and age group bring points for their team in relay events in each session as follows: 1st place – 14 points, 2nd – 10 points, 3rd – 8 points.

=== Open age group ===
In 2023, eight (8) fastest swimmers from final A in each gender bring points for their team in individual events as follows:

Place	1st	2nd	3rd	4th	5th	6th	7th	8th
Points	9	7	6	5	4	3	2	1

The fastest relay team from each country in each gender bring points for their team in relay events in each session as follows:

Place	1st	2nd	3rd
Points	18	14	12

== Championships ==
The list is incomplete

Year	City	Venue	Date	Overall winner
2009	(Lithuania) Alytus	Alytus Sports and Recreation Centre	February 28 – March 1	Lithuania
2010	(Estonia) Tartu	Aura Center	March 6–7	Lithuania
2011	(Latvia) Riga	Ķīpsala Pool	March 12–13	Lithuania
2012	(Lithuania) Alytus	Alytus Sports and Recreation Centre	March 9–10	Lithuania
2013	(Estonia) Tartu	Aura Center	March 8–9	Lithuania
2014	(Latvia) Riga	Ķīpsala Pool	March 7–8	Lithuania
2015	(Lithuania) Kaunas	Girstutis Swimming Pool	April 10–11	Lithuania
2016	(Estonia) Tallinn	Kalev Spa Water Park	April 22–23	Estonia
2017	(Latvia) Riga	Ķīpsala Pool	March 31 – April 1	Estonia
2018	(Lithuania) Kaunas	Girstutis Swimming Pool	March 23–24	Lithuania
2019	(Estonia) Tartu	Aura Center	March 22–23	Estonia
2020	(Latvia) Riga	Ķīpsala Pool	March 7–8	Estonia
2021	(Lithuania) Klaipėda	Klaipėda Pool	March 6–7	Lithuania
2022	(Estonia) Tartu	Aura Center	March 26–27	Estonia
2023	(Latvia) Riga	Ķīpsala Pool	March 3–4	Estonia
2024	(Lithuania) Vilnius		March 23–24	
2025	(Estonia) Tartu	Aura Center	March 8–9	
2026	(Latvia) Riga		March 7–8	

== Events ==
- Freestyle: 50 m, 100 m, 200 m, 400 m
- Backstroke: 50 m, 100 m, 200 m
- Breaststroke: 50 m, 100 m, 200 m
- Butterfly: 50 m, 100 m, 200 m
- Individual medley: 200 m, 400 m
- Relay: 4×100 m free, 4×100 m medley

== See also ==
- List of Baltic records in swimming
