= Urtė Kazakevičiūtė =

Lithuanian swimmer (born 1993)

Personal information
- Born: October 15, 1993 (age 32)

Sport
- Sport: Swimming
- Strokes: Breaststroke
- College team: Northern Arizona University
Medal record
Representing Lithuania
Baltic Championships
Gold medal – first place	2011 Riga	200m breaststroke
Silver medal – second place	2011 Riga	50m breaststroke
Silver medal – second place	2011 Riga	100m breaststroke

Urtė Kazakevičiūtė (born 15 October 1993) is a Lithuanian swimmer. During the 2009 World Aquatics Championships she set national Lithuanian records in the 50 m and 200 m breaststroke events. Kazakevičiūtė was swam in the 2010 Youth Olympics. Currently she swims for Northern Arizona University, located in Flagstaff, Arizona, United States, where she boasts many wins in her divisional championships.

== Achievements ==
Year	Competition	Venue	Position	Event	Notes
2009	World Aquatics Championships	Rome, Italy	42nd	50 m breaststroke	32.37 (NR)
2009	World Aquatics Championships	Rome, Italy	44th	100 m breaststroke	1:10.63
2009	World Aquatics Championships	Rome, Italy	25th	200 m breaststroke	2:28.13 (NR)
2010	Youth Olympics	Singapore	8th	50 m breaststroke	33.22
2010	Youth Olympics	Singapore	8th	100 m breaststroke	1:11.63
2010	Youth Olympics	Singapore	8th	200 m breaststroke	2:37.33
2011	Baltic Championships	Riga, Latvia	2nd	50 m breaststroke	33.50
2011	Baltic Championships	Riga, Latvia	2nd	100 m breaststroke	1:12.98
2011	Baltic Championships	Riga, Latvia	1st	200 m breaststroke	2:37.91
