= Swimming at the 2026 European Aquatics Championships – Men's 50 metre butterfly =

Men's 50 metre butterfly at the 2026 European Aquatics Championships
- Venue: Paris Aquatic Centre
- Dates: 10 August (heats and semifinals); 11 August (final)
- Competitors: 78 from 34 nations
- Winning time: 22.52

Medalists
gold medal	Egor Kornev
silver medal	Maxime Grousset	France
bronze medal	Grigori Pekarski

The Men's 50 metre butterfly competition of the 2026 European Aquatics Championships was held on 10 and 11 August 2026.

== Records ==
Prior to the competition, the existing world, European and championship records were as follows:

	Name	Nation	Time	Location	Date
World record European record	Andriy Govorov	Ukraine	22.27	Rome	1 July 2018
Championship record	Andriy Govorov	Ukraine	22.48	Glasgow	7 August 2018

== Results ==
=== Heats ===
The heats were started on 10 August at 10:06.

Rank	Heat	Lane	Swimmer	Nation	Time	Notes
1	8	4	Maxime Grousset	France	22.49	Q
2	7	4	Noè Ponti	Switzerland	22.69	Q
3	6	4	Egor Kornev	Neutral Athletes B	22.70	Q
4	8	2	Stergios Bilas	Greece	22.93	Q
5	6	3	Kristóf Milák	Hungary	22.96	Q
6	7	7	Grigori Pekarski	Neutral Athletes A	22.97	Q
7	6	5	Diogo Ribeiro	Portugal	23.04	Q
8	7	5	Sean Niewold	Netherlands	23.09	Q
9	8	5	Thomas Ceccon	Italy	23.10	Q
10	7	3	Luca Nik Armbruster	Germany	23.12	Q
11	6	6	Egor Iurchenko	Neutral Athletes B	23.16	Q
12	8	3	Oleg Kostin	Neutral Athletes B	23.18	
12	8	8	Lorenzo Gargani	Italy	23.18	Q
14	7	8	Vlad Mihalache	Romania	23.23	Q
15	6	7	Ralf Tribuntsov	Estonia	23.24	Q
16	6	1	Daniel Zaitsev	Estonia	23.29	Q
17	8	1	Nikita Baez	France	23.31	Q
18	8	6	Roman Shevliakov	Neutral Athletes B	23.32	
19	8	0	Jere Hribar	Croatia	23.35	
20	7	2	Joshua Gammon	Great Britain	23.37	
21	6	2	Jacob Peters	Great Britain	23.39	
21	7	1	Ole Mats Eidam	Germany	23.39	
23	5	3	Ondřej Slavík	Czech Republic	23.43	
24	7	0	Denis Popescu	Romania	23.44	
25	5	4	Michele Lamberti	Italy	23.50	
26	8	7	Meiron Cheruti	Israel	23.51	
27	5	9	Simen Schmitz-Lund	Norway	23.54	
28	5	0	Lukas Edl	Austria	23.56	
29	5	2	Casper Puggaard	Denmark	23.61	
30	6	0	Josha Salchow	Germany	23.62	
31	5	7	Paweł Uryniuk	Poland	23.66	
32	5	1	Elias Klev	Norway	23.68	
33	5	5	Rasmus Skovgaard Nickelsen	Denmark	23.69	
34	7	6	Simon Bucher	Austria	23.72	
35	6	8	Nikola Miljenić	Croatia	23.75	
36	3	4	Martin Kartavi	Israel	23.77	
37	8	9	Mateusz Jan Chowaniec	Poland	23.80	
38	4	4	Ihor Troianovskyi	Ukraine	23.81	
39	4	2	Szymon Mróz	Poland	23.82	
40	5	6	Artsiom Yarmak	Neutral Athletes A	23.84	
41	1	8	Nikita Sheremet	Ukraine	23.88	
42	3	7	Nicholas Lia	Norway	23.97	
43	6	9	Melker Rosengren	Sweden	23.98	
44	4	6	Miloš Milenković	Montenegro	23.99	
45	5	8	Robin Yeboah	Switzerland	24.03	
46	3	6	Alex Ahtiainen	Estonia	24.06	
47	4	5	Michele Busa	Italy	24.07	
48	3	5	Elias Persson	Sweden	24.09	
48	4	0	Jakub Bartosz Majerski	Poland	24.09	
50	3	1	Julian Koch	Germany	24.12	
51	4	7	Maro Miknić	Croatia	24.14	
52	7	9	Oskar Hoff	Sweden	24.16	
53	3	2	Julien Henx	Luxembourg	24.17	
54	4	3	Nemanja Maksić	Serbia	24.23	
55	3	3	Tajus Juška	Lithuania	24.36	
55	4	8	Dmitrijs Tolstihs	Latvia	24.36	
57	1	1	Arian Kadić	Bosnia and Herzegovina	24.37	
57	3	0	Jānis Deivs Dzirkalis	Latvia	24.37	
57	4	1	Rémi Fabiani	Luxembourg	24.37	
60	2	6	Nikodim Markovic	Netherlands	24.38	
61	2	5	Tom Sela	Israel	24.42	
62	4	9	Luka Kmetić	Croatia	24.46	
63	3	8	Michael Laitarovsky	Israel	24.47	
64	3	9	Matthew Hamilton	Ireland	24.50	
65	2	3	Florian Frippiat	Luxembourg	24.56	
66	2	1	Roope Koskela	Finland	24.59	
66	2	2	Ārons Roderts	Latvia	24.59	
68	2	4	Birnir Freyr Hálfdánarson	Iceland	24.60	
69	2	0	Símon Elías Statkevicius	Iceland	24.70	
70	2	8	Matej Duša	Slovakia	24.71	
71	2	7	Viktor Kopf	Austria	24.83	
72	1	6	Evghenii Poponin	Moldova	25.25	
73	1	4	Siim Kesküla	Estonia	25.29	
74	1	3	Christian Giefing	Austria	25.33	
75	2	9	Lukas Peacock	Denmark	25.34	
76	1	5	Ronens Kermans	Latvia	25.44	
77	1	2	Arion Budima	Kosovo	26.04	
78	1	7	Krasniqi Dior	Kosovo	27.76	

=== Semifinals ===
The semifinals were started on 10 August at 18:30.

Rank	Heat	Lane	Swimmer	Nation	Time	Notes
1	2	5	Egor Kornev	Neutral Athletes B	22.36	Q, CR, NR
2	2	4	Maxime Grousset	France	22.49	Q
3	1	4	Noè Ponti	Switzerland	22.53	Q
4	2	6	Diogo Ribeiro	Portugal	22.68	Q
5	1	2	Luca Nik Armbruster	Germany	22.71	Q, NR
5	2	2	Thomas Ceccon	Italy	22.71	Q
7	1	3	Grigori Pekarski	Neutral Athletes A	22.75	Q
7	2	3	Kristóf Milák	Hungary	22.75	Q
9	1	5	Stergios Bilas	Greece	22.79	
10	1	1	Ralf Tribuntsov	Estonia	22.92	
11	1	6	Sean Niewold	Netherlands	22.95	
12	2	7	Egor Iurchenko	Neutral Athletes B	23.04	
13	2	1	Vlad Mihalache	Romania	23.10	
14	2	8	Daniel Zaitsev	Estonia	23.26	
15	1	7	Lorenzo Gargani	Italy	23.29	
16	1	8	Nikita Baez	France	23.35	

=== Final ===
The final was held on 11 August at 18:37.

Rank	Lane	Swimmer	Nation	Time	Notes
1st place, gold medalist(s)	4	Egor Kornev	Neutral Athletes B	22.52	
2nd place, silver medalist(s)	5	Maxime Grousset	France	22.54	
3rd place, bronze medalist(s)	1	Grigori Pekarski	Neutral Athletes A	22.68	
4	7	Thomas Ceccon	Italy	22.72	
5	6	Diogo Ribeiro	Portugal	22.75	
6	2	Luca Nik Armbruster	Germany	22.84	
6	8	Kristóf Milák	Hungary	22.84	
8	3	Noè Ponti	Switzerland	22.91	
