= Swimming at the 2010 Summer Youth Olympics – Girls' 50 metre breaststroke =

The Girls' 50 metre breaststroke event at the 2010 Youth Olympic Games took place on August 15–16, at the Singapore Sports School.

== Medalists ==
Gold	Rachel Nicol; Canada	32.06
Silver	Martina Carraro; Italy	32.44
Bronze	Ana de Pinho Rodrigues; Portugal	32.49

== Heats ==
=== Heat 1 ===
Rank	Lane	Name	Nationality	Time	Notes
1	5	Mariana Henriques	Angola	37.65	
2	3	Angelika Ouedraogo	Burkina Faso	42.21	
	4	Maimouna Boubacar Badie	Niger	DSQ	

=== Heat 2 ===
Rank	Lane	Name	Nationality	Time	Notes
1	5	Ana de Pinho Rodrigues	Portugal	32.75	Q
2	3	Tjaša Vozelj	Slovenia	32.77	Q
3	4	Chang Wang	China	33.38	Q
4	6	Taryn Mackenzie	South Africa	33.51	Q
5	2	Noora Laukkanen	Finland	33.64	Q
6	7	Aurelia Trnovcova	Slovakia	34.08	
7	1	Amanda Jia Xin Liew	Brunei	36.51	

=== Heat 3 ===
Rank	Lane	Name	Nationality	Time	Notes
1	2	Rachel Nicol	Canada	32.16	Q
2	4	Martina Carraro	Italy	32.69	Q
3	3	Lina Rathsack	Germany	32.99	Q
4	6	Urte Kazakeviciute	Lithuania	33.12	Q
5	5	Yvette Man-Yi Kong	Hong Kong	33.31	Q
6	1	Katarina Đurđević	Montenegro	35.21	
7	7	Kum Jong Ho	North Korea	37.10	

=== Heat 4 ===
Rank	Lane	Name	Nationality	Time	Notes
1	4	Alessandra Marchioro	Brazil	32.65	Q
2	2	Evghenia Tanasienco	Moldova	33.22	Q
3	3	Tina Meža	Slovenia	33.37	Q
4	6	Maria Georgia Michalaka	Greece	33.40	Q
5	7	Yuliya Litvina	Kazakhstan	33.49	Q
6	1	Cheryl Lim	Singapore	33.82	Q
7	8	Brigitte Rasmussen	Virgin Islands	35.77	
	5	Hyejin Kim	South Korea	DNS	

== Semifinal ==
=== Heat 1 ===
Rank	Lane	Name	Nationality	Time	Notes
1	5	Ana de Pinho Rodrigues	Portugal	32.30	Q
2	4	Alessandra Marchioro	Brazil	32.70	Q
3	3	Lina Rathsack	Germany	32.73	Q
4	7	Maria Georgia Michalaka	Greece	32.96	Q
5	2	Tina Meža	Slovenia	33.31	
6	1	Taryn Mackenzie	South Africa	33.47	
7	6	Evghenia Tanasienco	Moldova	33.63	
8	8	Cheryl Lim	Singapore	33.65	

=== Heat 2 ===
Rank	Lane	Name	Nationality	Time	Notes
1	4	Rachel Nicol	Canada	32.13	Q
2	5	Martina Carraro	Italy	32.23	Q
3	3	Tjaša Vozelj	Slovenia	32.87	Q
4	6	Urte Kazakeviciute	Lithuania	33.05	Q
5	8	Noora Laukkanen	Finland	33.22	
6	7	Chang Wang	China	33.29	
7	1	Yuliya Litvina	Kazakhstan	33.64	
8	2	Yvette Man-Yi Kong	Hong Kong	33.69	

== Final ==
Rank	Lane	Name	Nationality	Time	Notes
1st place, gold medalist(s)	4	Rachel Nicol	Canada	32.06	
2nd place, silver medalist(s)	5	Martina Carraro	Italy	32.44	
3rd place, bronze medalist(s)	3	Ana de Pinho Rodrigues	Portugal	32.49	
4	6	Alessandra Marchioro	Brazil	32.60	
5	2	Lina Rathsack	Germany	32.79	
6	1	Maria Georgia Michalaka	Greece	32.90	
7	7	Tjaša Vozelj	Slovenia	33.14	
8	8	Urte Kazakeviciute	Lithuania	33.22	
