= Deng Jian =

Chinese swimmer

Personal information
- Born: October 19, 1989 (age 36) Shandong, China

Sport
- Sport: Swimming

Deng Jian (born October 19, 1989) is a Chinese swimmer who competed for Team China at the 2008 Summer Olympics.

== Major achievements ==
- 2008 National Champions Tournament - 3rd 200 m back
