= Marko Tiidla =

Estonian swimmer

Personal information
- Born: July 1, 1991 (age 35) Tartu, Estonia

Sport
- Sport: Swimming

Marko Tiidla (born 1 July 1991) is an Estonian swimmer.

He was born in Tartu. In 2013 he graduated from the University of Tartu with a degree in information technology.

He began his swimming career in 2001, coached by Annelii Jaal. He is multiple-times Estonian champion in different swimming disciplines. 2009–2014 he was a member of Estonian national swimming team.

2013-2016 he was a coach at Tartu Swimming Club.
