= Pavel Narõškin =

Estonian swimmer

Personal information
- Born: June 12, 1992 (age 34) Narva, Estonia

Sport
- Sport: Swimming

Pavel Narõškin (born 12 June 1992) is an Estonian swimmer.

He was born in Narva. In 2014 he graduated from University of Tartu's Institute of Physical Education.

He began his swimming career in 1999. His coaches have been Vladimir Uhhov and Kaja Haljaste. He is multiple-times Estonian champion in different swimming disciplines. 2008–2014 he was a member of Estonian national swimming team.

Since 2017 he is a coach at Orca Swim Club.
