= Maria Pallas =

Estonian swimmer

Personal information
- Born: January 13, 1993 (age 33) Tallinn, Estonia

Sport
- Sport: Swimming

Maria Pallas (since 2021 Aasmets; born 13 January 1993 in Tallinn) is an Estonian swimmer. She is a student at the University of Tartu.

She holds several swimming championships. From 2009 to 2011 she was a member of the Estonian national swimming team.
