= Kertu Ly Alnek =

Estonian swimmer

Personal information
- National team: Estonia
- Born: 14 September 1999 (age 26) Tartu, Estonia
- Height: 181 cm (5 ft 11 in)

Sport
- Sport: Swimming

Kertu Ly Alnek (born 14 September 1999) is an Estonian butterfly and freestyle swimmer.

She is 6-time long course and 9-time short course Estonian swimming champion. She has broken 4 Estonian records in swimming.
