= Gerda Pak =

Estonian swimmer

Personal information
- Born: October 3, 1993 (age 32) Keila, Estonia

Sport
- Sport: Swimming
- Strokes: Butterfly
- Coach: Tõnu Meijel; Siiri Põlluveer

Gerda Pak (born 3 October 1993) is an Estonian swimmer.

She was born in Keila. In 2003 she graduated from Audentes Sports Gymnasium.

She began her swimming career in 2002, coached by Tõnu Meijel. 2004-2009 her coach was Siiri Põlluveer. She is multiple-times Estonian champion in different swimming disciplines. 2010–2018 she was a member of Estonian national swimming team.
