= Aura Center =

Swimming center in Tartu, Estonia

Coordinates: 58.37544919223153°N 26.734663075672778°E

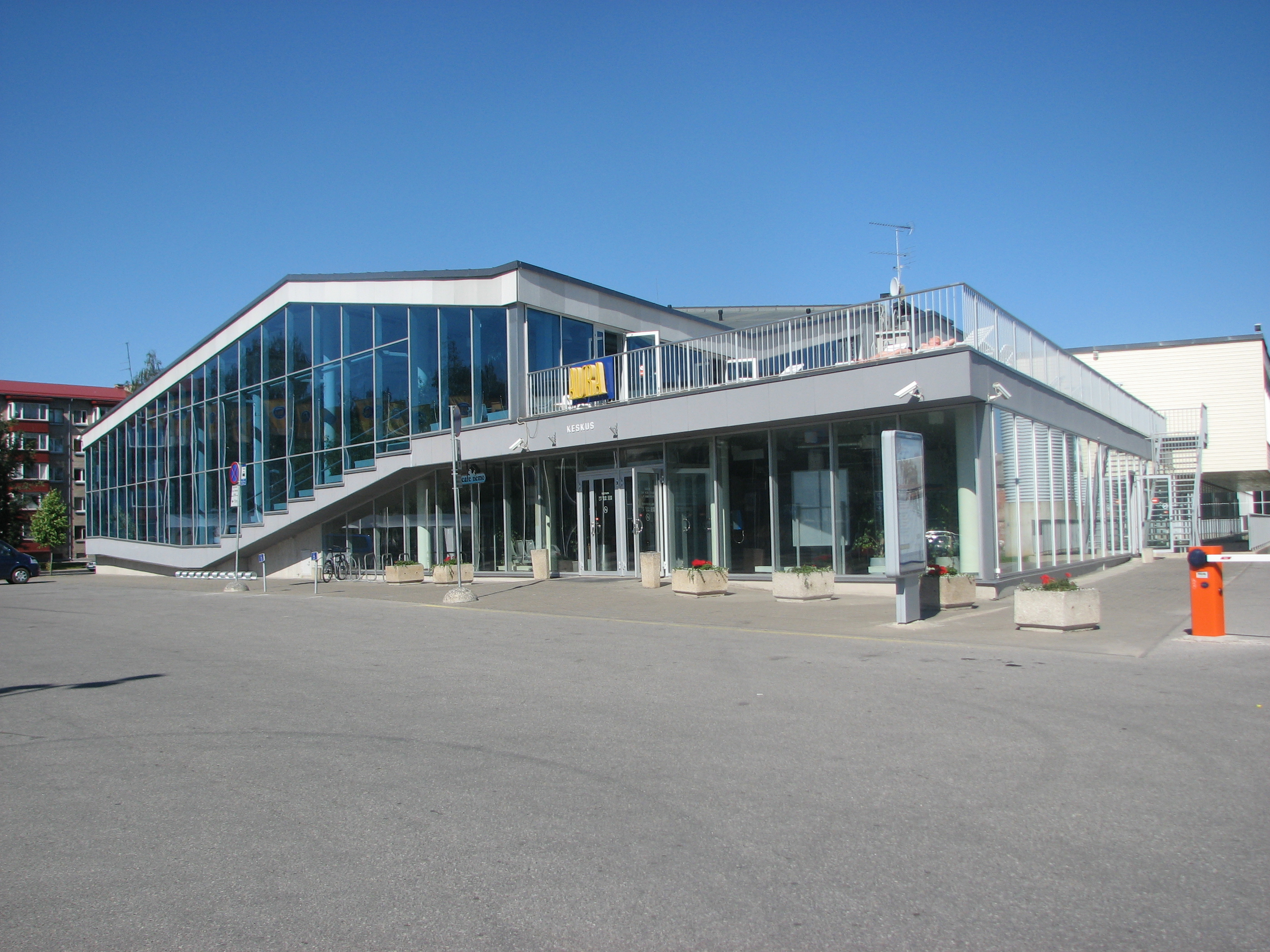
Aura Center

Aura Center (Estonian: Aura Keskus) is a swimming center in Tartu, Estonia.

The center was opened on 1 October 2001.

According to the center, they have about 350,000 visitors a year and an average of about 1,000 a day.
