= Laura Tolmats =

Estonian swimmer

Personal information
- Born: May 5, 1994 (age 32) Tartu, Estonia

Sport
- Sport: Swimming
- Strokes: Butterfly, freestyle
- Coach: Mihhail Krupnin; Siiri Polluveer; Dmitri Kapelin

Laura Tolmats (born 5 May 1994) is an Estonian swimmer.

She was born in Tartu. In 2013 she graduated from Audentes Sports Gymnasium.

She began her swimming career in 2002, coached by Mihhail Krupnin. Later her coaches were Siiri Põlluveer and Dmitri Kapelin. She is multiple-times Estonian champion in different swimming disciplines. 2010–2016 she was a member of Estonian national swimming team.
