= Endri Vinter =

Estonian swimmer

Personal information
- Born: February 23, 1993 (age 33) Pärnu, Estonia

Sport
- Sport: Swimming
- Strokes: Backstroke, freestyle

Endri Vinter (born 23 February 1993) is an Estonian swimmer.

He was born in Pärnu. In 2017 he graduated from the University of Tartu's Pärnu College in enterprise and project management specialty (Estonian: ettevõtluse ja projektijuhtimise eriala).

He began his swimming career in 2001. His coaches have been Eve Leppik, Marika and Artur Tikkerbär. He is multiple-times Estonian champion in different swimming disciplines. 2010–2016 he was a member of Estonian national swimming team.
