= Annika Saarnak =

Estonian swimmer

Personal information
- National team: Estonia
- Born: 19 September 1988 (age 37) Pühalepa, Estonia
- Height: 177 cm (5 ft 10 in)

Sport
- Sport: Swimming

Annika Saarnak (from 2014 Annika Aljand, born 19 September 1988) is an Estonian butterfly, freestyle and medley swimmer.

She is 15-time long course and 8-time short course Estonian swimming champion. She has broken 9 Estonian records in swimming.

== Personal ==
She is married to Martti Aljand, they have a daughter.
