= Kalev Spa Water Park =

Water park in Tallinn, Estonia

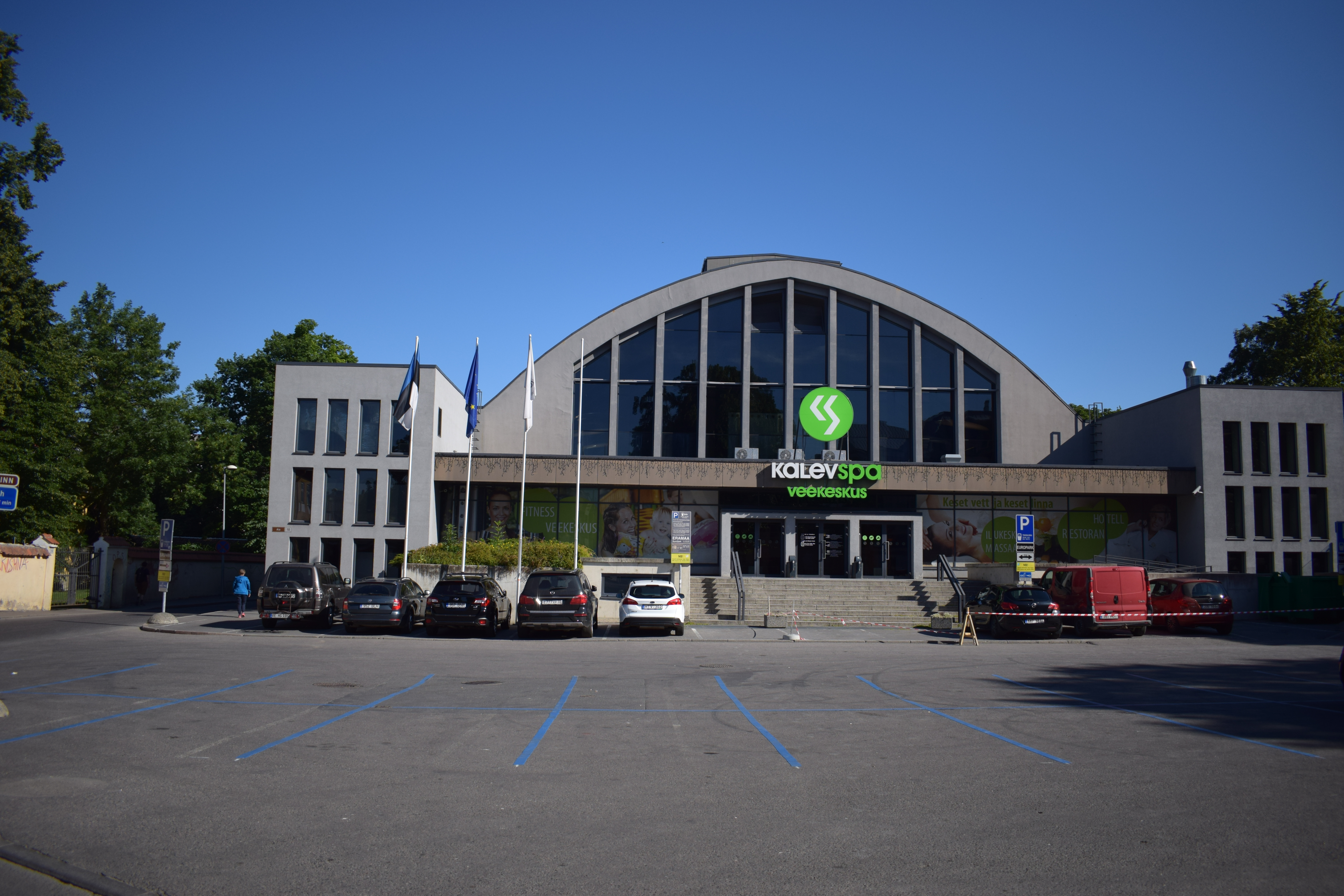
- Interactive map of Kalev Spa Water Park
- Address: Aia 18, 10111 Tallinn, Estonia
- Coordinates: 59°26′24″N 24°45′04″E

Website
- www.kalevspa.ee

Kalev Spa Water Park (Estonian: Kalev Spa Veekeskus) is a water park in Tallinn, Estonia. The park consists of 50 m swimming pool which is the biggest in Estonia.

The park was opened in 1965. In 2006/2019 the park was renovated.

In the park there are operating Kalev Swimming School (Estonian: Kalevi Ujumiskool) and Orca Swim Club.
