= Jelena Petrova =

Estonian swimmer

Personal information
- Full name: Jelena Petrova
- National team: Estonia
- Born: 6 June 1989 (age 37) Tallinn, then part of Estonian SSR, Soviet Union
- Height: 1.75 m (5 ft 9 in)
- Weight: 58 kg (128 lb)

Sport
- Sport: Swimming
- Strokes: Freestyle
- Club: SK Garant
- Coach: Dmitri Kapelini

Jelena Petrova (born June 6, 1989) is an Estonian former swimmer, who specialized in long-distance freestyle events. She is a 19-time Estonian long-course swimming champion, 11-time short-course swimming champion and a three-time Nordic junior champion.

Petrova qualified for the women's 800 m freestyle, as Estonia's youngest swimmer (aged 15), at the 2004 Summer Olympics in Athens, by clearing a FINA B-standard entry time of 9:00.40 from the European Junior Championships in Lisbon, Portugal. She challenged six other swimmers on the first heat, including El Salvador's Golda Marcus (a varsity swimmer for the Florida State Seminoles). Petrova cruised to third place by two tenths of a second (0.20) behind fellow 15-year-old Kwon You-Ri of South Korea in 9:01.62. Petrova failed to advance into the final, as she placed twenty-third overall in the preliminaries.

She holds Estonian record in 800m freestyle swimming (Short Course).
