= Vadim Romanov =

Russian footballer and coach

Personal information
- Full name: Vadim Yuryevich Romanov
- Date of birth: 3 May 1978 (age 48)
- Place of birth: Yegoryevsk, Moscow Oblast, Russian SFSR
- Height: 1.83 m (6 ft 0 in)
- Position: Midfielder

Team information
- Current team: Spartak Moscow (assistant manager)

Youth career
- 1995–1998: Spartak Moscow

Senior career*
Years	Team	Apps	(Gls)
1997–1998	Spartak Moscow	0	(0)
1997–1998	→ Spartak-2 Moscow	49	(7)
1999	Metallurg Lipetsk	18	(2)
2000–2001	Khimki	6	(0)
2001–2002	Krasnoznamensk	61	(10)
2003–2005	Oryol	109	(4)
2006	SKA-Energia Khabarovsk	10	(0)
2007	Zvezda Serpukhov	11	(0)
2007–2008	Naftan Novopolotsk	39	(0)
2009	Stavropolye-2009	4	(0)
2009–2011	Oka Stupino	27	(1)

Managerial career
- 2015–2021: Spartak Moscow (academy)
- 2022–2024: Spartak Moscow (U19)
- 2024–: Spartak Moscow (assistant)
- 2025: Spartak Moscow (caretaker)
- * Club domestic league appearances and goals

Vadim Yuryevich Romanov (Russian: Вадим Юрьевич Романов; born 3 May 1978) is a Russian professional football coach and a former player. He is the assistant manager of FC Spartak Moscow.

== Coaching career ==
On 11 November 2025, Romanov was appointed caretaker manager of FC Spartak Moscow. On 5 January 2026, he returned to assistant coach position after Spartak signed Juan Carlos Carcedo as the manager.
