= Maria Albert =

Estonian swimmer

Personal information
- Born: January 7, 1985 (age 41) Tallinn, then part of Estonian SSR, Soviet Union

Sport
- Sport: Swimming

Maria Albert (since 2009 Mäihäniemi; born 7 January 1985) is an Estonian swimmer.

She was born in Tallinn. She began her studies at the Tallinn Health Care College and in 2018, she graduated from Tampere University's Faculty of Medicine.

She began her swimming career in 1996, coached by Ain Kaasik. She competed at World Aquatics Championships. She is multiple-times Estonian champion in different swimming disciplines. She has also won Finnish championships. 1997–2008 she was a member of Estonian national swimming team.

Since 2020 she is working as a midwife and at the Hatanpää hospital in Tampere.
