= Merle Liivand =

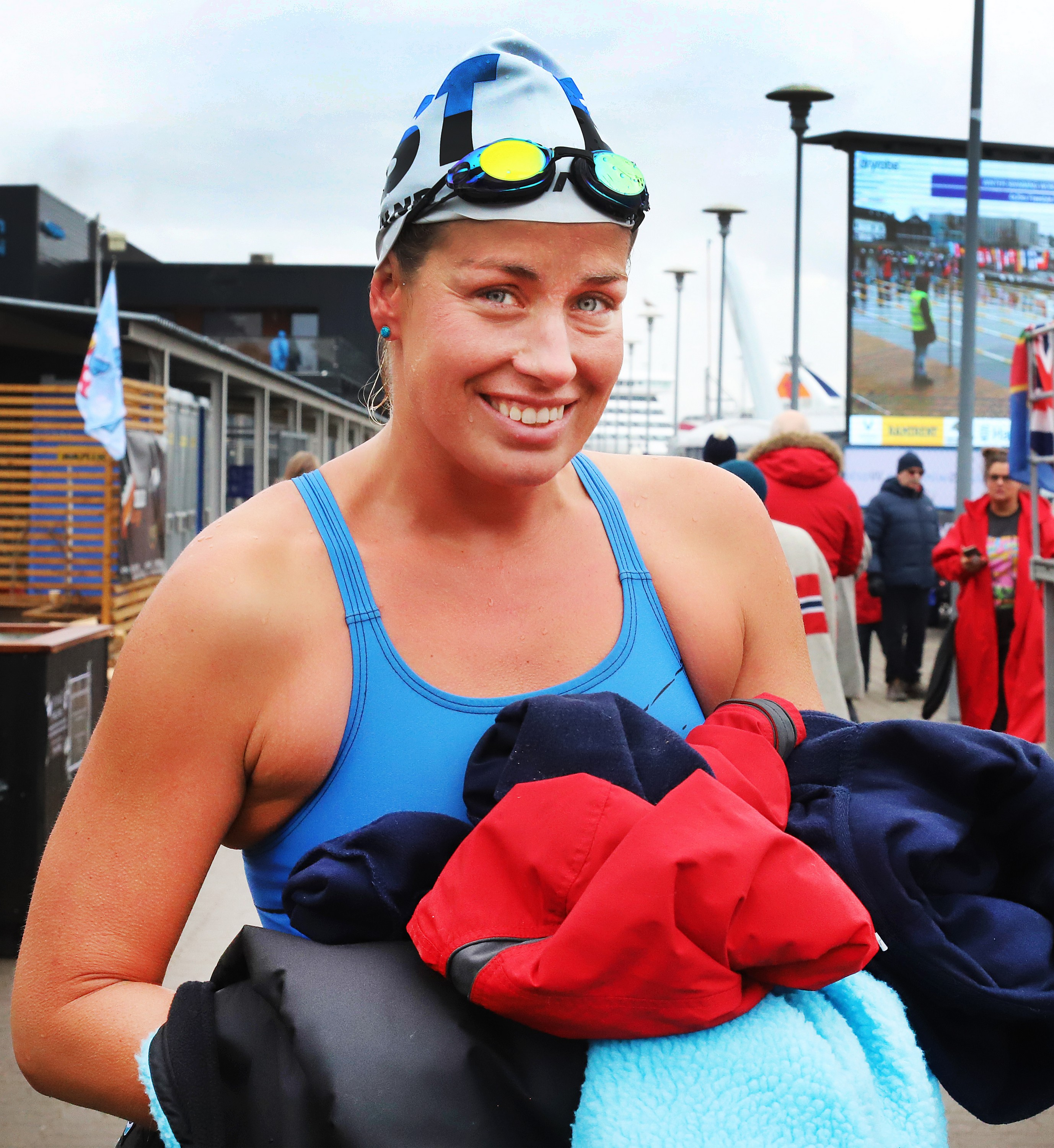
Merle Liivand in 2024

Merle Liivand (also known as Eco Mermaid and Merle The Mermaid; born 17 April 1991) is an Estonian Olympic swimmer and environmental activist.

== Career ==
As of 2015, Liivand was teaching swimming lessons at St. Francis College's mermaid school. In May 2022, she completed a 26.22 miles (42.19 kilometers) swim while wearing a silicone monofin in 11 hours and 54 seconds. The swim took place in Florida and came after her latest 18.6 miles (30 kilometers) record, which was achieved in 9 hours and 19 minutes.

In 2023, she swam for 30 miles (50 kilometers) for 14 hours and 15 minutes around Biscayne Bay in Miami, Florida. The goal of swimming for 30 miles was set to allude to the United Nations Environment Program's "30x30" goals for 2030. During the swim, she picked up garbage in the water with a plastic bag. In that year, Liivand had received five Guinness World Records awards related to swimming.

According to Liivand, she started attempting to raise awareness about marine pollution after observing high concentrations of garbage in the sea and on the beach during the 2016 Olympic games at Rio de Janeiro. She stated that she had planned to swim at the Biscayne Bay at one point, but canceled the event due to the concentration of toxic debris and plastic in the water. She stated that, during a training session prior to her June 2022 swim in Florida, she nearly ingested microplastics while breathing in the water.

== Personal life ==
Liivand was born in Tallinn. She started swimming as a child due to her breathing problems. She moved from Estonia to Florida at the age of 21. She lives in Miami Beach, Florida.
