= Kätlin Sepp =

Estonian swimmer

Personal information
- Born: 8 August 1992 (age 33) Tallinn, Estonia
- Height: 183 cm (6 ft 0 in)

Sport
- Sport: Swimming
- College team: Louisiana State University

Kätlin Sepp (born 8 August 1992) is an Estonian backstroke, butterfly and freestyle swimmer. She is 34-time long course and 51-time short course Estonian swimming champion. She has broken 29 Estonian records in swimming.

== Personal ==
Her sister Sigrid Sepp is also a swimmer.
