= Triin Aljand =

Estonian swimmer (born 1985)

Personal information
- Full name: Triin Aljand
- National team: Estonia
- Born: 8 July 1985 (age 41) Tallinn, then part of Estonian SSR, Soviet Union
- Height: 1.79 m (5 ft 10 in)

Sport
- Sport: Swimming
- Strokes: butterfly, freestyle
- Club: Audentese SK
- College team: Texas A&M University 2009
- Coach: Steve Bultman (Texas A&M)
Medal record
Women's swimming
Representing Estonia
European Championships (LC)
Silver medal – second place	2012 Debrecen	50 m butterfly
European Championships (SC)
Silver medal – second place	2011 Szczecin	50 m butterfly
Silver medal – second place	2012 Chartres	50 m freestyle
Bronze medal – third place	2010 Eindhoven	50 m butterfly
Bronze medal – third place	2011 Szczecin	50 m freestyle

Triin Aljand (born 8 July 1985) is a retired Estonian swimmer who competed for Texas A&M University and won a silver medal at the 2012 European Aquatics Championships in 50 m butterfly. Specializing in the 50 and 100-meter freestyle, she competed in the 2004, 2008, and 2012 Summer Olympics for Estonia, but did not reach the finals.

== Swimming for Texas A&M ==
Born in Tallinn, Estonia, she attended Texas A&M University, where she swam for the women's varsity team under Hall of Fame Head Coach Steve Bultman. While swimming for Texas A&M, Aljand received 23 All-America honors and captured a total of 16 relay and individual conference titles. By the time she graduated A&M in 2009, she held five school records, all of which were still top-five marks among A&M swimming records in 2022. Her outstanding swimming helped lead the Aggies to their first two Women's SEC conference titles in 2007 and 2008.

Excelling in sprint freestyle, on 21 November 2008 she broke the National Collegiate Athletic Association record for women in the 50-yard freestyle with her time of 21.61, though the record was disallowed after it was found the pool was just over one inch short.

== Olympics ==
She competed in the 2004, 2008 and 2012 Summer Olympics in the 50 m and 100 m freestyle and 100 butterfly, but never reached the finals. She also participated in multiple FINA World Aquatics Championships. Against intense world competition, her top finishes were a 19th in the 50-meter freestyle in the 2012 Olympics and a 21st in the 50-meter freestyle in the 2008 Olympics.

=== Honors ===
As the holder of many team records and one of only two A&M swimmers to compete in three or more Olympics as of 2022, she was elected to the Texas A&M Athletic Hall of Fame in 2022.

== Records ==
She set the Estonian national records three times in the 50-m butterfly on 12 December 2008. She set another national record in the 100-m butterfly at the 2008 European Short Course Swimming Championships on 14 December 2008.

== Personal ==
Her twin sister Berit and younger brother Martti are also swimmers. Her father Riho Aljand is a swimming coach, and her grandmother, Ulvi Voog (Indrikson) is a former Olympic swimmer.

She is married to Slovenian swimmer Peter Mankoč. They have a daughter Brina, who was born in 2015.

Awards
Preceded by Kristina Šmigun-Vähi	Estonian Sportswoman of the Year; 2011, 2012	Succeeded by Julia Beljajeva
