= Karleen Kersa =

Estonian swimmer

Personal information
- Born: May 15, 1996 (age 30) Tallinn, Estonia

Sport
- Sport: Swimming
- Strokes: Freestyle, butterfly

Karleen Kersa (born 15 May 1996) is an Estonian swimmer.

She was born in Tallinn. Her older sister is swimmer Katriin Kersa. She studied at the University of Tartu's Institute of Physical Education.

She began her swimming career in 2006, coached by Heidi and Ain Kaasik. She is competed at European Aquatics Championships. She is multiple-times Estonian champion in different swimming disciplines. 2011–2017 she was a member of Estonian national swimming team.

Since 2015 she is coaching at Orca Swim Club.
