= Katriin Kersa =

Estonian swimmer

Personal information
- Born: January 12, 1994 (age 32) Tallinn, Estonia

Sport
- Sport: Swimming

Katriin Kersa (born 12 January 1994) is an Estonian swimmer.

She was born in Tallinn. Her younger sister is swimmer Karleen Kersa. In 2016 she graduated from Tallinn University's Faculty of Physical Education.

She began her swimming career in 2001, coached by Merli Didvig. Since 2009 her coaches have been Heidi Kaasik and Ain Kaasik. She has competed at Summer Youth Olympics. She is multiple-times Estonian champion in different swimming disciplines. 2008–2011 she was a member of Estonian national swimming team.

Since 2011 she is a coach at Orca Swim Club.
