= Margaret Markvardt =

Estonian swimmer (born 2000)

Personal information
- National team: Estonia
- Born: 1 April 2000 (age 26) Tallinn, Estonia
- Height: 170 cm (5 ft 7 in)

Sport
- Sport: Swimming

Margaret Markvardt (born 1 April 2000) is an Estonian backstroke, butterfly, freestyle and medley swimmer. She is 28-time long course and 22-time short course Estonian swimming champion. She has broken 12 Estonian records in swimming, including relay races.

In 2018, she competed in the girls' 50 metre backstroke event at the 2018 Summer Youth Olympics held in Buenos Aires, Argentina. She did not qualify to compete in the semi-finals.

== Personal ==
His father is a retired Nordic combined skier Ago.
