= Tess Grossmann =

Estonian swimmer

Personal information
- Born: August 2, 1994 (age 31) Tallinn, Estonia

Sport
- Sport: Swimming

Tess Grossmann (born 2 August 1994) is an Estonian swimmer.

She was born in Tallinn.

She began her swimming career in 1999, coached by Viive Soll. Later her coaches were Heidi and Ain Kaasik, and others. She has competed at the World Aquatics Championships. She is multiple-times Estonian champion in different swimming disciplines. 2008–2016 she was a member of Estonian national swimming team.

She has been a coach at Kalev Swimming School in Tallinn.
