= Martti Aljand =

Estonian swimmer

Personal information
- Full name: Martti Aljand
- Nationality: Estonia
- Born: 22 November 1987 (age 38) Tallinn, then part of Estonian SSR, Soviet Union
- Height: 6 ft 1 in (1.85 m)
- Weight: 180 lb (82 kg)

Sport
- Sport: Swimming
- Strokes: Medley, Breaststroke
- Club: TOP Ujumisklubi
- College team: California Golden Bears
Medal record
Men's swimming
Representing Estonia
European Championships (SC)
Silver medal – second place	2012 Chartres	100 m breaststroke
Bronze medal – third place	2011 Szczecin	100 m medley
Bronze medal – third place	2012 Chartres	100 m medley

Martti Aljand (born 22 November 1987 in Tallinn) is an Estonian individual medley and breaststroke swimmer.

At 2008 Summer Olympics he finished 45th in 100 m breaststroke with national record and 46th in 200 m breaststroke.

== Records ==
He is 33-time long course and 43-time short course Estonian swimming champion. He has broken 58 Estonian records in swimming.

== Personal ==
His older sisters Triin and Berit are also a swimmers. His father Riho is a swimming coach, and his grandmother, Ulvi Voog (Indrikson), is a former Olympic swimmer.

He is married to another Estonian swimmer Annika Saarnak, they have a daughter.
