= Maria Romanjuk =

Estonian swimmer

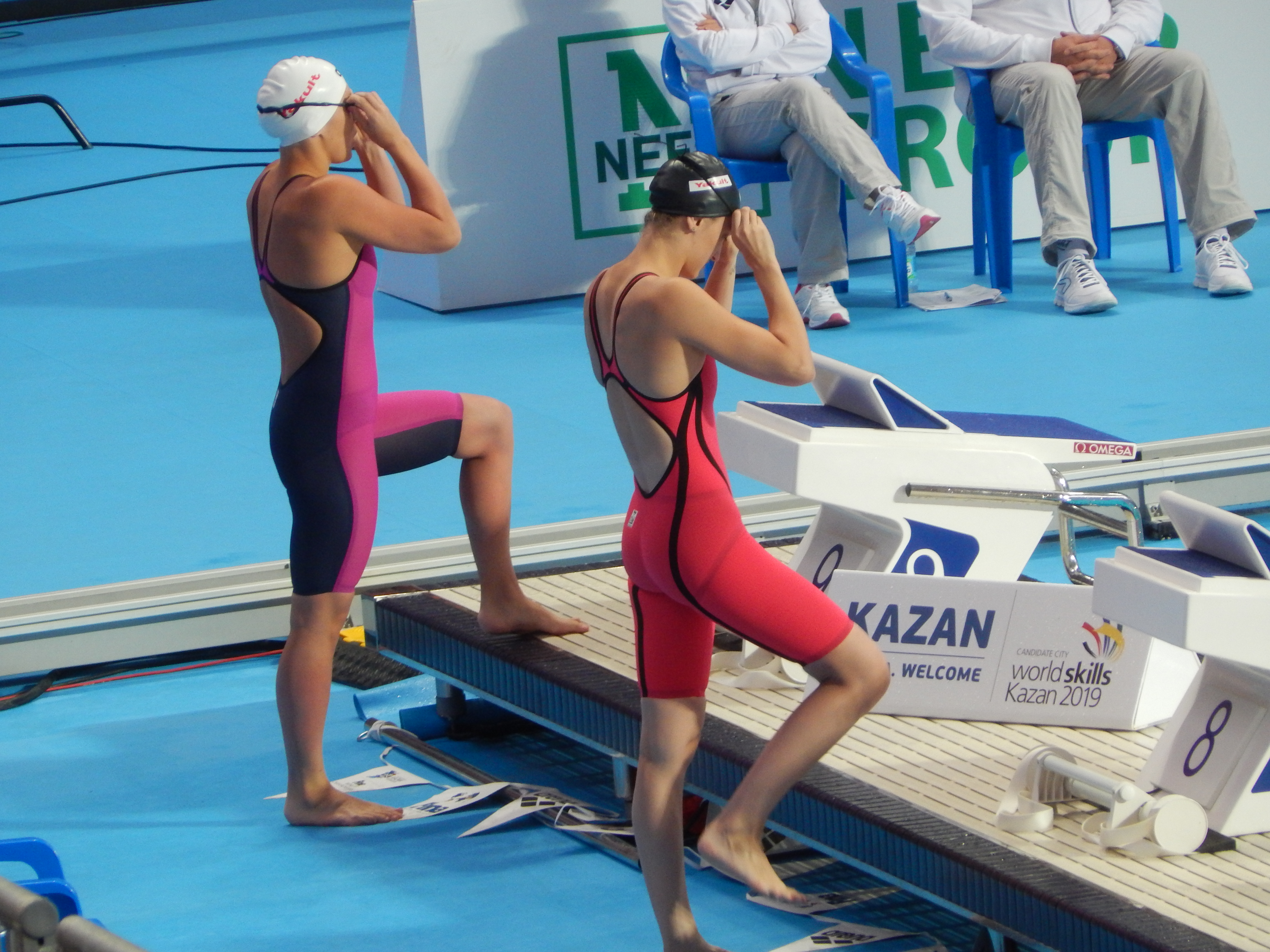

Personal information
- Born: 15 August 1996 (age 29) Tallinn, Estonia
- Height: 171 cm (5 ft 7 in)

Sport
- Sport: Swimming
Medal record
Women's swimming
Representing Estonia
Baltic States Championships
Gold medal – first place	2011 Riga	400 m freestyle
Gold medal – first place	2011 Riga	400 m medley
Gold medal – first place	2017 Riga	50 m breaststroke
Gold medal – first place	2017 Riga	100 m breaststroke
Gold medal – first place	2017 Riga	200 m breaststroke

Maria Romanjuk (born 15 August 1996) is an Estonian swimmer. She competed in the women's 100 metre breaststroke event at the 2016 Summer Olympics. She is 46-time long course and 41-time short course Estonian swimming champion. She has broken 15 Estonian records in swimming.

== See also ==
- List of Estonian records in swimming
