= Sigrid Sepp =

Estonian swimmer

Personal information
- Born: 2 July 1998 (age 28) Tallinn, Estonia
- Height: 183 cm (6 ft 0 in)

Sport
- Sport: Swimming
- College team: University of Hawaii at Manoa

Sigrid Sepp (born 2 July 1998) is an Estonian backstroke, butterfly and medley swimmer. She competed in the women's 50 metre backstroke event at the 2017 World Aquatics Championships. She is 24-time long course and 15-time short course Estonian swimming champion. She has broken 8 Estonian records in swimming.

Sepp currently attends the University of Hawaii, where she is a member of their swimming and diving team. Her sister, Kätlin Sepp, is also a swimmer.
