= Ralf Tribuntsov =

Estonian swimmer

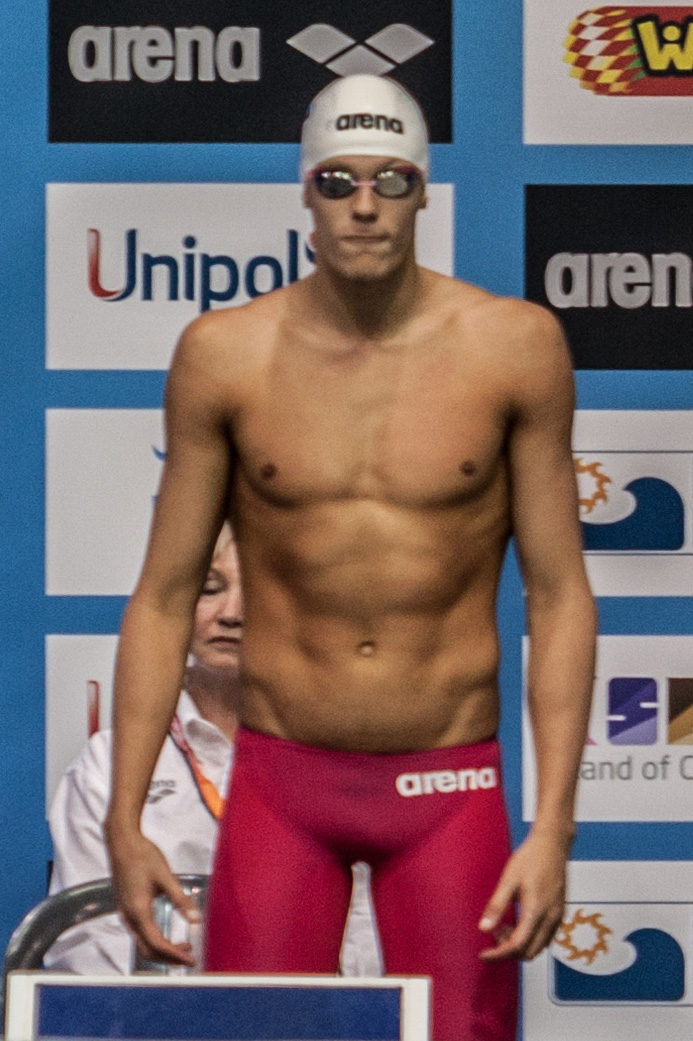
- Tribuntsov at the 2015 European Short Course Swimming Championships, Netanya

Personal information
- Born: 22 September 1994 (age 31) Silkeborg, Denmark
- Height: 1.98 m (6 ft 6 in)

Sport
- Sport: Swimming
- College team: University of Southern California
Medal record
Men's swimming
Representing Estonia
European Championships (SC)
Gold medal – first place	2025 Lublin	50 m backstroke

Ralf Tribuntsov (born 22 September 1994) is a backstroke, butterfly, freestyle and medley Estonian swimmer. He is 28-time long course and 19-time short course Estonian swimming champion. He has broken 31 Estonian records in swimming.

== See also ==
- List of Estonian records in swimming
