= Daniel Zaitsev =

Estonian swimmer (born 1997)

Personal information
- Born: 13 December 1997 (age 28) Tallinn, Estonia
- Height: 1.83 m (6 ft 0 in)

Sport
- Sport: Swimming
- Club: Garant
Medal record
Men's swimming
Representing Estonia
Baltic States Championships
Gold medal – first place	2017 Riga	100 m butterfly
Silver medal – second place	2017 Riga	50 m butterfly

Daniel Zaitsev (born 13 December 1997) is an Estonian butterfly and freestyle swimmer. He competed in the men's 50 metre butterfly event at the 2017 World Aquatics Championships. He is a 18-time long course and 26-time short course Estonian swimming champion. He has broken 27 Estonian records in swimming.

== See also ==
- List of Estonian records in swimming
