= Estonian Swimming Federation =

Sports governing body in Estonia

LEN
- Founded: 1922
- FINA affiliation: 1927 (1991)
- LEN affiliation: 1929 (1991)
- Website: www.swimming.ee
- President: Simon Renno

Eesti Ujumisliit is the governing body of swimming in Estonia. It is a non-profit organization that was founded in 1922 under the name of "Eesti Kerge-, Raske- ja Veespordiliit" (EKRAVE Liit). It joined FINA in 1927 and LEN in 1929. In 1934, Eesti Veespordi Liit (Estonian Watersport Union) was founded. During the Soviet occupation, federation was closed and was re-founded in 1990 under the new name "Eesti Ujumisliit". In 1991, the federation was reinstated to FINA and LEN.
