= Pjotr Degtjarjov =

Estonian swimmer (born 1993)

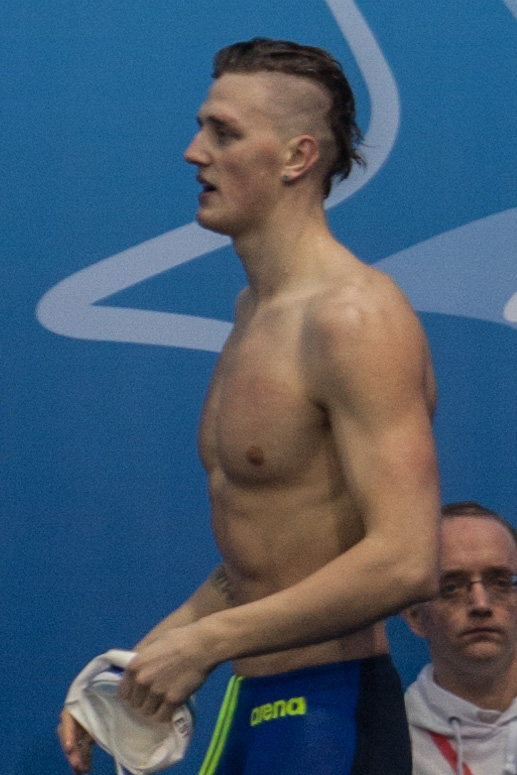
- Degtjarjov at the 2015 European Short Course Swimming Championships, Netanya

Personal information
- Born: 10 July 1993 (age 32) Tallinn, Estonia
- Height: 204 cm (6 ft 8 in)

Sport
- Sport: Swimming

Pjotr Degtjarjov (born 10 July 1993, Tallinn) is an Estonian breaststroke and freestyle swimmer. He is 32-time long course and 26-time short course Estonian swimming champion. He has broken 20 Estonian records in swimming.
