= Kregor Zirk =

Estonian swimmer (born 1999)

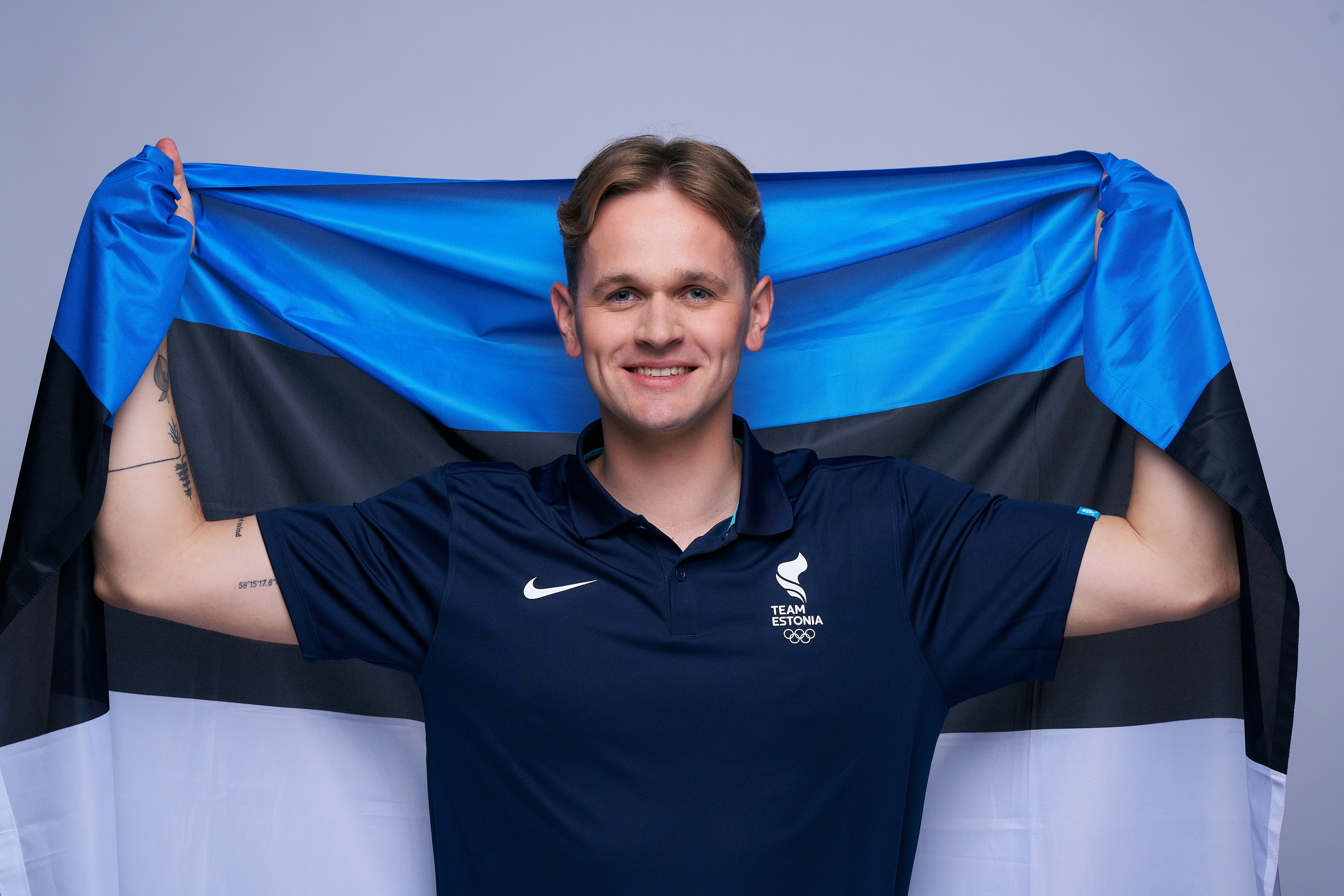
- Kregor Zirk, 2025

Personal information
- Born: 3 July 1999 (age 27) Tartu, Estonia
- Height: 1.83 m (6 ft 0 in)
- Weight: 78 kg (172 lb)

Sport
- Sport: Swimming
- Club: Energy Standard International Swim Club // Ujumise Spordiklubi

Kregor Zirk (born 3 July 1999) is an Estonian swimmer. He is multi time Estonian swimming champion in both short and long course. He has broken Estonian age group and senior records around 300 times.

== Career ==
He competed in the men's 100 metre freestyle event at the 2017 World Aquatics Championships. In the 2019 World Aquatic Championships he competed in the 200m and 400m Freestyle, as well as the 100m and 200m Butterfly, with his best placing being 19th in the 400m Freestyle. During the competition he re-set his own Estonian records in the 200m and 400m Freestyle, and 200m Butterfly.

In the Autumn of 2019 he was member of the inaugural International Swimming League swimming for the Energy Standard International Swim Club, who won the team title in Las Vegas, Nevada, in December. At the second stop in Naples, ITA he raced 1,150m which was the furthest racing distance of any male athlete. Across these two stops Zirk (2,250m), and his teammate Mary-Sophie Harvey (2,600m) had raced more than all other swimmers.
