= Swimming at the 2018 European Aquatics Championships – Men's 50 metre backstroke =

Men's 50 metre backstroke at the 2018 European Aquatics Championships
- Venue: Tollcross International Swimming Centre
- Dates: 3 August (heats and semifinals); 4 August (final)
- Competitors: 53 from 28 nations
- Winning time: 24.00

Medalists
gold medal	Kliment Kolesnikov	Russia
silver medal	Robert Glință	Romania
bronze medal	Shane Ryan	Ireland

The Men's 50 metre backstroke competition of the 2018 European Aquatics Championships was held on 3 and 4 August 2018.

== Records ==
Prior to the competition, the existing world and championship records were as follows.

	Name	Nation	Time	Location	Date
World record European record	Liam Tancock	Great Britain	24.04	Rome	2 August 2009
Championship record	Camille Lacourt	France	24.07	Budapest	12 August 2010

The following new records were set during this competition.

Date	Event	Name	Nationality	Time	Record
4 August	Final	Kliment Kolesnikov	Russia	24.00	WR, CR

== Results ==
=== Heats ===
The heats were started on 3 August at 10:24.

Rank	Heat	Lane	Name	Nationality	Time	Notes
1	6	5	Shane Ryan	Ireland	24.32	Q, NR
2	5	4	Kliment Kolesnikov	Russia	24.58	Q
3	5	5	Robert Glință	Romania	24.59	Q
4	6	4	Vladimir Morozov	Russia	24.65	Q
5	5	6	Christian Diener	Germany	24.89	Q
6	4	4	Jérémy Stravius	France	24.92	Q
7	4	6	Mikita Tsmyh	Belarus	24.95	Q
8	6	3	Sergey Fesikov	Russia	25.01	
9	4	5	Jonatan Kopelev	Israel	25.02	Q
10	4	3	Apostolos Christou	Greece	25.05	Q
11	5	7	Conor Ferguson	Ireland	25.08	Q
12	6	2	Simone Sabbioni	Italy	25.17	Q
13	6	7	Kacper Stokowski	Poland	25.22	Q
14	5	2	Yakov Toumarkin	Israel	25.25	Q
15	5	3	Nikita Ulyanov	Russia	25.29	
16	4	7	Thierry Bollin	Switzerland	25.40	Q
17	6	1	Nicholas Pyle	Great Britain	25.49	Q
18	5	8	Thomas Ceccon	Italy	25.50	Q
19	4	0	Stanislas Huille	France	25.54	
20	3	2	Ralf Tribuntsov	Estonia	25.60	
20	4	9	Gytis Stankevičius	Lithuania	25.60	
22	3	3	Karl Luht	Estonia	25.62	
23	4	8	Björn Seeliger	Sweden	25.65	
24	3	5	David Gamburg	Israel	25.68	
25	3	4	Nikolaos Sofianidis	Greece	25.69	
25	6	0	Paul-Gabriel Bedel	France	25.69	
27	3	6	Markus Lie	Norway	25.73	
28	5	1	Georgios Spanoudakis	Greece	25.74	
29	3	8	Bernhard Reitshammer	Austria	25.78	
30	4	2	Kamil Kaźmierczak	Poland	25.80	
31	6	8	Maksim Dzialendzik	Belarus	25.81	
32	4	1	Viktar Staselovich	Belarus	25.82	
33	3	7	Gabriel Lópes	Portugal	25.85	
34	2	5	Başlakov İskender	Turkey	25.99	
35	5	0	Gustav Hökfelt	Sweden	26.01	
36	2	6	Ádám Telegdy	Hungary	26.16	
37	5	9	Tomáš Franta	Czech Republic	26.26	
38	3	1	Girts Feldbergs	Latvia	26.22	
39	3	0	Luke Greenbank	Great Britain	26.23	
40	1	6	Ziv Kalontarov	Israel	26.30	
41	2	4	Ümitcan Güreş	Turkey	26.41	
42	6	9	Andrei-Mircea Anghel	Romania	26.50	
43	3	9	Armin Lelle	Estonia	26.53	
44	1	4	Ege Başer	Turkey	26.59	
45	2	8	Anton Lončar	Croatia	26.62	
46	2	2	Niko Mäkelä	Finland	26.66	
47	2	7	Rasim Gör	Turkey	26.82	
48	2	9	Nikola Acin	Serbia	26.83	
49	2	3	Adam Černek	Slovakia	26.96	
50	2	1	Marko-Matteus Langel	Estonia	27.33	
51	2	0	Sergey Kuznetsov	Finland	27.35	
52	1	5	Matthew Galea	Malta	28.14	
53	1	3	Dren Ukimeraj	Kosovo	29.78	
—	6	6	Richárd Bohus	Hungary	Did not start	

=== Semifinals ===
The semifinals were held on 3 August at 17:25.

==== Semifinal 1 ====
Rank	Lane	Name	Nationality	Time	Notes
1	4	Kliment Kolesnikov	Russia	24.25	Q, WJ, NR
2	5	Vladimir Morozov	Russia	24.29	Q
3	3	Jérémy Stravius	France	24.88	Q
4	6	Jonatan Kopelev	Israel	24.92	Q
5	2	Conor Ferguson	Ireland	24.99	
6	7	Kacper Stokowski	Poland	25.46	
7	1	Thierry Bollin	Switzerland	25.47	
8	8	Thomas Ceccon	Italy	25.50	

==== Semifinal 2 ====
Rank	Lane	Name	Nationality	Time	Notes
1	5	Robert Glință	Romania	24.12	Q
2	4	Shane Ryan	Ireland	24.57	Q
3	6	Mikita Tsmyh	Belarus	24.66	Q
4	2	Apostolos Christou	Greece	24.96	Q
5	7	Simone Sabbioni	Italy	24.99	
6	1	Yakov Toumarkin	Israel	25.09	
7	8	Nicholas Pyle	Great Britain	25.10	
8	3	Christian Diener	Germany	25.13	

=== Final ===
The final was held on 4 August at 18:18.

Rank	Lane	Name	Nationality	Time	Notes
1st place, gold medalist(s)	5	Kliment Kolesnikov	Russia	24.00	WR
2nd place, silver medalist(s)	4	Robert Glință	Romania	24.55	
3rd place, bronze medalist(s)	6	Shane Ryan	Ireland	24.64	
4	3	Vladimir Morozov	Russia	24.69	
5	7	Jérémy Stravius	France	24.83	
6	2	Mikita Tsmyh	Belarus	25.04	
7	8	Apostolos Christou	Greece	25.14	
8	1	Jonatan Kopelev	Israel	25.41	
