= Swimming at the 2018 European Aquatics Championships – Men's 100 metre backstroke =

Men's 100 metre backstroke at the 2018 European Aquatics Championships
- Venue: Tollcross International Swimming Centre
- Dates: 5 August (heats and semifinals); 6 August (final)
- Competitors: 52 from 26 nations
- Winning time: 52.53

Medalists
| gold medal | Kliment Kolesnikov | Russia |
| silver medal | Evgeny Rylov | Russia |
| bronze medal | Apostolos Christou | Greece |

The Men's 100 metre backstroke competition of the 2018 European Aquatics Championships was held on 5 and 6 August 2018.

== Records ==
Prior to the competition, the existing world and championship records were as follows.

| | Name | Nation | Time | Location | Date |
|---|---|---|---|---|---|
| World record | Ryan Murphy | United States | 51.85 | Rio de Janeiro | 13 August 2016 |
| European record Championship record | Camille Lacourt | France | 52.11 | Budapest | 10 August 2010 |

== Results ==
=== Heats ===
The heats were started on 5 August at 09:56.

| Rank | Heat | Lane | Name | Nationality | Time | Notes |
|---|---|---|---|---|---|---|
| 1 | 6 | 4 | Evgeny Rylov | Russia | 52.91 | Q |
| 2 | 5 | 4 | Kliment Kolesnikov | Russia | 53.01 | Q |
| 3 | 4 | 4 | Grigoriy Tarasevich | Russia | 53.34 | |
| 4 | 5 | 2 | Simone Sabbioni | Italy | 53.95 | Q |
| 5 | 6 | 5 | Robert Glință | Romania | 54.01 | Q |
| 6 | 5 | 5 | Apostolos Christou | Greece | 54.40 | Q |
| 7 | 6 | 7 | Jan-Philip Glania | Germany | 54.44 | Q |
| 8 | 5 | 7 | Luke Greenbank | Great Britain | 54.47 | Q |
| 9 | 4 | 5 | Yakov Toumarkin | Israel | 54.57 | Q |
| 10 | 4 | 1 | Conor Ferguson | Ireland | 54.61 | Q |
| 11 | 4 | 6 | Christian Diener | Germany | 54.63 | Q |
| 12 | 5 | 9 | Tomáš Franta | Czech Republic | 54.65 | Q |
| 13 | 6 | 6 | Shane Ryan | Ireland | 54.67 | Q |
| 14 | 3 | 7 | Brodie Williams | Great Britain | 54.83 | Q |
| 15 | 5 | 6 | Richárd Bohus | Hungary | 54.85 | Q |
| 16 | 4 | 3 | Thomas Ceccon | Italy | 54.89 | Q |
| 16 | 4 | 8 | Nicholas Pyle | Great Britain | 54.89 | |
| 18 | 4 | 7 | Paul Bedel | France | 54.92 | Q |
| 19 | 6 | 8 | Maxence Orange | France | 54.96 | |
| 20 | 4 | 2 | Mikita Tsmyh | Belarus | 55.00 | |
| 21 | 3 | 5 | Bernhard Reitshammer | Austria | 55.06 | |
| 22 | 6 | 2 | Radosław Kawęcki | Poland | 55.07 | |
| 23 | 3 | 9 | Ralf Tribuntsov | Estonia | 55.09 | |
| 24 | 6 | 1 | Stanislas Huille | France | 55.11 | |
| 25 | 5 | 1 | Nikolaos Sofianidis | Greece | 55.26 | |
| 25 | 6 | 0 | Gustav Höfkelt | Sweden | 55.26 | |
| 27 | 5 | 3 | Kacper Stokowski | Poland | 55.34 | |
| 28 | 3 | 8 | Anton Lončar | Croatia | 55.39 | |
| 29 | 2 | 4 | Markus Lie | Norway | 55.52 | |
| 30 | 4 | 0 | Thierry Bollin | Switzerland | 55.53 | |
| 31 | 1 | 6 | Karl Luht | Estonia | 55.60 | |
| 31 | 4 | 9 | Jakub Skierka | Poland | 55.60 | |
| 33 | 3 | 3 | Gytis Stankevičius | Lithuania | 55.63 | |
| 34 | 5 | 0 | Elliot Clogg | Great Britain | 55.77 | |
| 34 | 6 | 3 | Nikita Ulyanov | Russia | 55.77 | |
| 36 | 2 | 3 | Björn Seeliger | Sweden | 55.89 | |
| 37 | 3 | 1 | Geoffroy Mathieu | France | 56.09 | |
| 38 | 3 | 0 | Girts Feldbergs | Latvia | 56.12 | |
| 39 | 2 | 8 | Ivan Gajšek | Croatia | 56.41 | |
| 40 | 6 | 9 | Kamil Kaźmierczak | Poland | 56.47 | |
| 41 | 3 | 2 | Viktar Staselovich | Belarus | 56.48 | |
| 42 | 2 | 2 | Nikola Acin | Serbia | 56.59 | |
| 43 | 2 | 6 | Armin Lelle | Estonia | 56.64 | |
| 44 | 3 | 4 | Jonatan Kopelev | Israel | 56.81 | |
| 45 | 2 | 7 | Ege Başer | Turkey | 56.95 | |
| 46 | 1 | 3 | Metin Aydın | Turkey | 57.19 | |
| 46 | 2 | 0 | Berk Özkul | Turkey | 57.19 | |
| 48 | 2 | 1 | Adam Černek | Slovakia | 57.83 | |
| 49 | 1 | 4 | Rasim Gör | Turkey | 57.90 | |
| 50 | 2 | 5 | Andrei-Mircea Anghel | Romania | 59.14 | |
| 51 | 2 | 9 | Thomas Wareing | Malta | 1:00.11 | |
| 52 | 1 | 5 | Dren Ukimeraj | Kosovo | 1:04.62 | |
| | 5 | 8 | David Gamburg | Israel | Did not start | |

=== Semifinals ===
The semifinals were started on 5 August at 17:31.

==== Semifinal 1 ====
| Rank | Lane | Name | Nationality | Time | Notes |
|---|---|---|---|---|---|
| 1 | 4 | Kliment Kolesnikov | Russia | 52.95 | Q, WJR |
| 2 | 5 | Robert Glință | Romania | 53.63 | Q |
| 3 | 2 | Christian Diener | Germany | 54.10 | Q |
| 4 | 3 | Jan-Philip Glania | Germany | 54.24 | Q |
| 5 | 1 | Richárd Bohus | Hungary | 54.58 | |
| 6 | 6 | Yakov Toumarkin | Israel | 54.63 | |
| 7 | 7 | Shane Ryan | Ireland | 54.79 | |
| 8 | 8 | Paul Bedel | France | 54.99 | |

==== Semifinal 2 ====
| Rank | Lane | Name | Nationality | Time | Notes |
|---|---|---|---|---|---|
| 1 | 4 | Evgeny Rylov | Russia | 53.20 | Q |
| 2 | 5 | Simone Sabbioni | Italy | 53.39 | Q |
| 3 | 3 | Apostolos Christou | Greece | 53.90 | Q |
| 4 | 8 | Thomas Ceccon | Italy | 54.24 | Q |
| 5 | 2 | Conor Ferguson | Ireland | 54.38 | |
| 6 | 1 | Brodie Williams | Great Britain | 54.60 | |
| 7 | 7 | Tomáš Franta | Czech Republic | 54.63 | |
| 8 | 6 | Luke Greenbank | Great Britain | 54.65 | |

=== Final ===
The final was started on 6 August at 17:07.

| Rank | Lane | Name | Nationality | Time | Notes |
|---|---|---|---|---|---|
| 1st place, gold medalist(s) | 4 | Kliment Kolesnikov | Russia | 52.53 | WJR, NR |
| 2nd place, silver medalist(s) | 5 | Evgeny Rylov | Russia | 52.74 | |
| 3rd place, bronze medalist(s) | 2 | Apostolos Christou | Greece | 53.72 | |
| 4 | 6 | Robert Glință | Romania | 53.81 | |
| 5 | 8 | Thomas Ceccon | Italy | 53.85 | |
| 5 | 3 | Simone Sabbioni | Italy | 53.85 | |
| 7 | 7 | Christian Diener | Germany | 53.92 | |
| 8 | 1 | Jan-Philip Glania | Germany | 54.35 | |
