= Swimming at the 2019 World Aquatics Championships – Men's 50 metre backstroke =

Swimming World Championship 2019

Men's 50 metre backstroke at the 2019 World Aquatics Championships
- Venue: Nambu University Municipal Aquatics Center
- Location: Gwangju, South Korea
- Dates: 27 July (heats and semifinals); 28 July (final)
- Competitors: 74 from 67 nations
- Winning time: 24.43

Medalists
| gold medal | Zane Waddell | South Africa |
| silver medal | Evgeny Rylov | Russia |
| bronze medal | Kliment Kolesnikov | Russia |

The Men's 50 metre backstroke competition at the 2019 World Championships was held on 27 and 28 July 2019.

== Records ==
Prior to the competition, the existing world and championship records were as follows.

| World record | Kliment Kolesnikov (RUS) | 24.00 | Glasgow, United Kingdom | 4 August 2018 |
| Competition record | Liam Tancock (GBR) | 24.04 | Rome, Italy | 2 August 2009 |

== Results ==
=== Heats ===
The heats were held on 27 July at 10:23.

| Rank | Heat | Lane | Name | Nationality | Time | Notes |
|---|---|---|---|---|---|---|
| 1 | 8 | 4 | Kliment Kolesnikov | Russia | 24.61 | Q |
| 2 | 7 | 5 | Michael Andrew | United States | 24.70 | Q |
| 3 | 8 | 3 | Jérémy Stravius | France | 24.78 | Q |
| 4 | 7 | 6 | Zane Waddell | South Africa | 24.84 | Q |
| 5 | 6 | 5 | Xu Jiayu | China | 24.87 | Q |
| 6 | 6 | 4 | Ryan Murphy | United States | 24.93 | Q |
| 7 | 5 | 6 | Mohamed Samy | Egypt | 24.95 | Q, NR |
| 8 | 6 | 2 | Guilherme Guido | Brazil | 24.98 | Q |
| 9 | 7 | 4 | Robert Glință | Romania | 25.00 | Q |
| 9 | 8 | 7 | Apostolos Christou | Greece | 25.00 | Q |
| 11 | 8 | 5 | Shane Ryan | Ireland | 25.10 | WD |
| 12 | 6 | 6 | Jonatan Kopelev | Israel | 25.11 | Q |
| 12 | 7 | 3 | Mikita Tsmyh | Belarus | 25.11 | Q |
| 14 | 8 | 6 | Richárd Bohus | Hungary | 25.12 | Q |
| 15 | 8 | 2 | Evgeny Rylov | Russia | 25.16 | Q |
| 16 | 7 | 2 | Michael Laitarovsky | Israel | 25.26 | Q |
| 17 | 7 | 7 | Simone Sabbioni | Italy | 25.28 | Q |
| 18 | 8 | 8 | Gábor Balog | Hungary | 25.29 | |
| 19 | 7 | 0 | Tomasz Polewka | Poland | 25.31 | |
| 20 | 6 | 3 | Mitch Larkin | Australia | 25.33 | |
| 21 | 7 | 8 | Thierry Bollin | Switzerland | 25.37 | |
| 22 | 5 | 4 | Lee Ju-ho | South Korea | 25.42 | |
| 23 | 6 | 1 | Juan Segura | Spain | 25.46 | |
| 24 | 5 | 2 | Quah Zheng Wen | Singapore | 25.50 | |
| 24 | 8 | 1 | Bernhard Reitshammer | Austria | 25.50 | |
| 26 | 6 | 0 | Thomas Ceccon | Italy | 25.58 | |
| 26 | 6 | 8 | Nicholas Pyle | Great Britain | 25.58 | |
| 28 | 6 | 7 | Conor Ferguson | Ireland | 25.60 | |
| 29 | 5 | 3 | Charles Hockin | Paraguay | 25.62 | |
| 30 | 5 | 5 | Alexis Santos | Portugal | 25.68 | |
| 31 | 6 | 9 | Tomáš Franta | Czech Republic | 25.69 | |
| 32 | 5 | 1 | Nguyen Paul Le | Vietnam | 25.73 | |
| 33 | 8 | 9 | Wang Peng | China | 25.79 | |
| 34 | 4 | 6 | Srihari Nataraj | India | 25.83 | NR |
| 35 | 4 | 2 | Merdan Ataýew | Turkmenistan | 25.84 | |
| 36 | 4 | 7 | Kristofer Rogic | Croatia | 25.91 | |
| 37 | 4 | 3 | Metin Aydin | Turkey | 25.95 | |
| 37 | 5 | 7 | Emir Muratović | Bosnia and Herzegovina | 25.95 | |
| 39 | 5 | 0 | Karl Johann Luht | Estonia | 25.97 | |
| 40 | 4 | 4 | Chuang Mu-lun | Chinese Taipei | 25.99 | |
| 41 | 7 | 1 | I Gede Siman Sudartawa | Indonesia | 26.00 | |
| 42 | 4 | 1 | Driss Lahrichi | Morocco | 26.12 | |
| 42 | 5 | 8 | Tern Jian Han | Malaysia | 26.12 | |
| 44 | 4 | 8 | Kristinn Þórarinsson | Iceland | 26.42 | |
| 44 | 4 | 9 | Ģirts Feldbergs | Latvia | 26.42 | |
| 46 | 3 | 6 | Steven Aimable | Senegal | 26.48 | |
| 46 | 7 | 9 | Robinson Molina | Venezuela | 26.48 | |
| 48 | 4 | 0 | Jack Kirby | Barbados | 26.52 | |
| 49 | 5 | 9 | Armando Barrera | Cuba | 26.53 | |
| 50 | 2 | 1 | Ali Al-Zamil | Kuwait | 26.79 | |
| 51 | 3 | 1 | Jason Arthur | Ghana | 26.84 | |
| 52 | 3 | 2 | Gabriel Castillo | Bolivia | 26.94 | |
| 53 | 4 | 5 | Kasipat Chograthin | Thailand | 26.95 | |
| 54 | 3 | 5 | Filippos Iakovidis | Cyprus | 27.00 | |
| 55 | 3 | 4 | Dimuth Peiris | Sri Lanka | 27.18 | |
| 56 | 1 | 3 | Ghirmai Efrem | Eritrea | 27.96 | |
| 57 | 3 | 3 | Bradley Vincent | Mauritius | 27.97 | |
| 58 | 1 | 5 | Delron Felix | Grenada | 28.15 | |
| 59 | 3 | 7 | Eisner Barberena | Nicaragua | 28.25 | |
| 60 | 3 | 8 | Ado Gargović | Montenegro | 28.27 | |
| 61 | 2 | 7 | Omar Alrowaila | Bahrain | 28.57 | |
| 63 | 2 | 8 | Juhn Tenorio | Northern Mariana Islands | 29.42 | |
| 62 | 2 | 2 | Juwel Ahmmed | Bangladesh | 29.33 | |
| 64 | 2 | 4 | Tendo Mukalazi | Uganda | 29.70 | |
| 65 | 3 | 0 | Leon Seaton | Guyana | 29.92 | |
| 66 | 2 | 0 | Alassane Lancina | Niger | 30.01 | |
| 67 | 3 | 9 | Santisouk Inthavong | Laos | 30.75 | |
| 68 | 2 | 5 | Olimjon Ishanov | Tajikistan | 31.51 | |
| 69 | 1 | 2 | Samuele Rossi | Seychelles | 31.67 | |
| 70 | 2 | 3 | Alie Kamara | Sierra Leone | 34.66 | |
| 71 | 2 | 9 | Houmed Barkat | Djibouti | 37.03 | |
| 72 | 1 | 6 | Hollingsword Wolul | Vanuatu | 38.67 | |
| 73 | 2 | 6 | Hedayatullah Noorzad | Afghanistan | 39.03 | NR |
| 74 | 1 | 4 | Phillip Kinono | Marshall Islands | 41.27 | |
| | 8 | 0 | Tomoe Zenimoto Hvas | Norway | DNS | |

=== Semifinals ===
The semifinals were started on 27 July at 21:08.

==== Semifinal 1 ====
| Rank | Lane | Name | Nationality | Time | Notes |
|---|---|---|---|---|---|
| 1 | 1 | Evgeny Rylov | Russia | 24.56 | Q |
| 2 | 3 | Ryan Murphy | United States | 24.64 | Q |
| 3 | 5 | Zane Waddell | South Africa | 24.72 | Q |
| 4 | 4 | Michael Andrew | United States | 24.76 | Q |
| 5 | 2 | Apostolos Christou | Greece | 24.76 | Q, NR |
| 6 | 6 | Guilherme Guido | Brazil | 24.87 | |
| 7 | 8 | Simone Sabbioni | Italy | 25.06 | |
| 8 | 7 | Mikita Tsmyh | Belarus | 25.12 | |

==== Semifinal 2 ====
| Rank | Lane | Name | Nationality | Time | Notes |
|---|---|---|---|---|---|
| 1 | 4 | Kliment Kolesnikov | Russia | 24.35 | Q |
| 2 | 2 | Robert Glință | Romania | 24.53 | Q |
| 3 | 3 | Xu Jiayu | China | 24.73 | Q |
| 4 | 1 | Richárd Bohus | Hungary | 24.88 | |
| 5 | 5 | Jérémy Stravius | France | 24.98 | |
| 6 | 8 | Michael Laitarovsky | Israel | 25.01 | |
| 7 | 7 | Jonatan Kopelev | Israel | 25.02 | |
| 8 | 6 | Mohamed Samy | Egypt | 25.16 | |

=== Final ===
The final was held on 28 July at 20:02.

| Rank | Lane | Name | Nationality | Time | Notes |
|---|---|---|---|---|---|
| 1st place, gold medalist(s) | 2 | Zane Waddell | South Africa | 24.43 | |
| 2nd place, silver medalist(s) | 3 | Evgeny Rylov | Russia | 24.49 | |
| 3rd place, bronze medalist(s) | 4 | Kliment Kolesnikov | Russia | 24.51 | |
| 4 | 6 | Ryan Murphy | United States | 24.53 | |
| 5 | 1 | Michael Andrew | United States | 24.58 | |
| 6 | 7 | Xu Jiayu | China | 24.64 | |
| 7 | 5 | Robert Glință | Romania | 24.67 | |
| 8 | 8 | Apostolos Christou | Greece | 24.75 | NR |
