= 2018 FINA World Swimming Championships (25 m) – Men's 50 metre backstroke =

Men's 50 metre backstroke at the 2018 FINA World Swimming Championships (25 m)
- Venue: Hangzhou Sports Park Stadium
- Dates: 13 December (heats and semifinals); 14 December (final)
- Competitors: 50
- Winning time: 22.58

Medalists
gold medal	Evgeny Rylov	Russia
silver medal	Ryan Murphy	United States
bronze medal	Shane Ryan	Ireland

The men's 50 metre backstroke competition of the 2018 FINA World Swimming Championships (25 m) was held on 13 and 14 December 2018.

== Records ==
Prior to the competition, the existing world and championship records were as follows.

	Name	Nation	Time	Location	Date
World record Championship record	Florent Manaudou	France	22.22	Doha	6 December 2014

== Results ==
=== Heats ===
The heats were started on 13 December at 9:56.

Rank	Heat	Lane	Name	Nationality	Time	Notes
1	5	4	Guilherme Guido	Brazil	23.00	Q
2	5	0	Shane Ryan	Ireland	23.03	Q
3	5	3	Christian Diener	Germany	23.15	Q
4	3	4	Kliment Kolesnikov	Russia	23.16	Q
5	5	5	Evgeny Rylov	Russia	23.16	Q
6	5	8	Ryan Murphy	United States	23.25	Q
7	4	5	Simone Sabbioni	Italy	23.34	Q
8	3	5	Robert Glință	Romania	23.38	Q
9	3	0	Matt Grevers	United States	23.39	Q
9	4	4	Xu Jiayu	China	23.39	Q
11	4	6	Guilherme Basseto	Brazil	23.46	Q
12	4	3	Mitch Larkin	Australia	23.49	Q
13	5	2	Apostolos Christou	Greece	23.57	Q
14	5	6	Dylan Carter	Trinidad and Tobago	23.73	Q
15	5	1	Gabriel Lópes	Portugal	23.75	Q
16	3	6	Viktar Staselovich	Belarus	23.79	Q
17	2	5	Charles Hockin	Paraguay	23.80	NR
18	3	3	Cătălin Ungur	Romania	23.91	
19	4	8	Tomoe Zenimoto Hvas	Norway	23.96	
20	4	7	İskender Başlakov	Turkey	23.98	
20	5	7	Conor Ferguson	Ireland	23.98	
22	3	2	Thierry Bollin	Switzerland	24.06	
23	3	8	Hugo González	Spain	24.10	
24	2	6	Omar Pinzón	Colombia	24.15	
25	3	1	Andrew Jeffcoat	New Zealand	24.17	
26	3	7	Tomáš Franta	Czech Republic	24.18	
27	4	1	Yuma Edo	Japan	24.24	
28	2	4	Kang Ji-seok	South Korea	24.54	
29	4	9	Kasipat Chograthin	Thailand	24.63	NR
30	4	2	Mikita Tsmyh	Belarus	24.69	
31	5	9	Adil Kaskabay	Kazakhstan	24.79	
32	2	2	Ádám Telegdy	Hungary	25.03	
33	2	7	Ģirts Feldbergs	Latvia	25.27	
34	1	7	Merdan Ataýew	Turkmenistan	25.30	
35	2	3	Armando Barrera Aira	Cuba	25.38	
36	4	0	Kristinn Þórarinsson	Iceland	25.39	
37	2	1	Tryfonas Hadjichristoforou	Cyprus	25.68	NR
38	3	9	Chang Hou-Chi	Chinese Taipei	25.85	
39	2	8	Eisner Barberena Espinoza	Nicaragua	26.45	
40	2	0	Andrianirina Lalanomena	Madagascar	27.16	
41	2	9	Bede Mark Aitu	Cook Islands	27.70	
42	1	0	Omar Alrowaila	Bahrain	28.30	
43	1	4	Santisouk Inthavong	Laos	29.82	
44	1	1	Mohammed Jibali	Libya	29.90	
45	1	9	Olimjon Ishanov	Tajikistan	30.50	
46	1	5	Imaan Ali	Maldives	31.16	
47	1	8	Tokelo Makepe	Botswana	34.73	
48	1	6	Yousif Ibrahim	Sudan	34.89	
49	1	2	Alie Kamara	Sierra Leone	36.41	
50	1	3	Hollingsword Wolul	Vanuatu	37.46	

=== Semifinals ===
The semifinals were started on 13 December at 20:22.

==== Semifinal 1 ====
Rank	Lane	Name	Nationality	Time	Notes
1	3	Ryan Murphy	United States	22.87	Q
2	2	Xu Jiayu	China	22.91	Q
3	4	Shane Ryan	Ireland	22.96	Q
4	5	Kliment Kolesnikov	Russia	23.15	Q
5	1	Dylan Carter	Trinidad and Tobago	23.19	NR
6	7	Mitch Larkin	Australia	23.22	
7	6	Robert Glință	Romania	23.25	
8	8	Viktar Staselovich	Belarus	23.80	

==== Semifinal 2 ====
Rank	Lane	Name	Nationality	Time	Notes
1	3	Evgeny Rylov	Russia	22.68	Q
2	4	Guilherme Guido	Brazil	23.00	Q
3	6	Simone Sabbioni	Italy	23.10	Q
4	5	Christian Diener	Germany	23.18	Q
5	2	Matt Grevers	United States	23.22	
6	7	Guilherme Basseto	Brazil	23.39	
7	1	Apostolos Christou	Greece	23.64	
8	8	Gabriel Lópes	Portugal	23.69	=NR

=== Final ===
The final was held on 14 December at 20:30.

Rank	Lane	Name	Nationality	Time	Notes
1st place, gold medalist(s)	4	Evgeny Rylov	Russia	22.58	NR
2nd place, silver medalist(s)	5	Ryan Murphy	United States	22.63	
3rd place, bronze medalist(s)	3	Shane Ryan	Ireland	22.76	NR
4	7	Kliment Kolesnikov	Russia	22.77	WJ
5	6	Guilherme Guido	Brazil	22.79	
6	2	Simone Sabbioni	Italy	23.26	
7	8	Dylan Carter	Trinidad and Tobago	23.44	
8	1	Christian Diener	Germany	23.49	
