= 2018 FINA World Swimming Championships (25 m) – Men's 100 metre backstroke =

Men's 100 metre backstroke at the 2018 FINA World Swimming Championships (25 m)
- Venue: Hangzhou Sports Park Stadium
- Dates: 11 December (heats and semifinals); 12 December (final)
- Competitors: 48 from 41 nations
- Winning time: 49.23

Medalists
gold medal	Ryan Murphy	United States
silver medal	Xu Jiayu	China
bronze medal	Kliment Kolesnikov	Russia

The men's 100 metre backstroke competition of the 2018 FINA World Swimming Championships (25 m) was held on 11 and 12 December 2018.

== Records ==
Prior to the competition, the existing world and championship records were as follows.

	Name	Nation	Time	Location	Date
World record	Xu Jiayu	China	48.88	Tokyo	11 November 2018
Championship record	Stanislav Donets	Russia	48.95	Dubai	19 December 2010

== Results ==
=== Heats ===
The heats were started on 11 December at 10:52.

Rank	Heat	Lane	Name	Nationality	Time	Notes
1	3	4	Guilherme Guido	Brazil	49.57	Q, SA
2	4	8	Ryan Murphy	United States	49.72	Q
3	4	4	Xu Jiayu	China	49.83	Q
4	3	0	Matt Grevers	United States	50.12	Q
5	4	3	Robert Glință	Romania	50.22	Q
6	4	5	Mitch Larkin	Australia	50.27	Q
7	3	3	Christian Diener	Germany	50.28	Q
8	5	5	Simone Sabbioni	Italy	50.62	Q
9	3	5	Radosław Kawęcki	Poland	50.73	Q
9	5	6	Ryosuke Irie	Japan	50.73	Q
11	5	4	Kliment Kolesnikov	Russia	50.76	Q
12	4	6	Apostolos Christou	Greece	50.92	Q
13	3	6	Guilherme Basseto	Brazil	50.94	Q
14	3	1	Anton Lončar	Croatia	51.09	Q
15	5	3	Andrei Shabasov	Russia	51.16	Q
16	2	4	Thomas Ceccon	Italy	51.30	Q
17	4	1	Gabriel Lopes	Portugal	51.48	NR
18	4	7	Viktar Staselovich	Belarus	51.59	
19	5	2	Markus Lie	Norway	51.60	
20	3	8	Bradlee Ashby	New Zealand	51.61	
21	5	7	Tomáš Franta	Czech Republic	51.82	
22	2	3	Omar Pinzón	Colombia	51.87	
23	4	2	Yuma Edo	Japan	51.88	
24	3	9	Conor Ferguson	Ireland	52.04	
25	3	7	Hugo González	Spain	52.05	
26	3	2	Cătălin Ungur	Romania	52.28	
27	5	8	Bernhard Reitshammer	Austria	52.34	
28	5	1	Li Guangyuan	China	52.36	
29	2	2	Paul Lê Nguyễn	Vietnam	52.48	
30	5	0	Dávid Földházi	Hungary	52.60	
31	5	9	İskender Başlakov	Turkey	52.79	
32	4	0	Thierry Bollin	Switzerland	53.02	
33	4	9	Chuang Mu-lun	Chinese Taipei	53.81	
34	1	8	Merdan Atayev	Turkmenistan	54.29	
35	2	7	Ģirts Feldbergs	Latvia	54.79	
36	1	1	Cadell Lyons	Trinidad and Tobago	54.92	
37	2	5	Lee Ju-ho	South Korea	55.02	
38	2	6	Armando Barrera Aira	Cuba	55.07	
39	2	9	Filippos Iakovidis	Cyprus	55.87	NR
40	2	0	Matthew Mays	United States Virgin Islands	56.09	
41	1	4	Eisner Barberena Espinoza	Nicaragua	56.78	
42	1	7	Heriniavo Michael Rasolonjatovo	Madagascar	59.02	
43	1	5	Abdulaziz Al-Obaidly	Qatar	59.41	
44	1	3	Bede Aitu	Cook Islands	59.68	
45	1	2	Omar Al-Rowaila	Bahrain	1:02.90	
46	1	6	Joel Gjini	Albania	1:05.00	
47	1	0	Ali Imaan	Maldives	1:08.71	
	2	8	Driss Lahrichi	Morocco	DSQ	

=== Semifinals ===
The semifinals were started on 11 December at 19:17.

Rank	Heat	Lane	Name	Nationality	Time	Notes
1	2	5	Xu Jiayu	China	49.21	Q
2	2	4	Guilherme Guido	Brazil	49.45	Q, SA
3	1	4	Ryan Murphy	United States	49.52	Q
4	2	7	Kliment Kolesnikov	Russia	49.62	Q
5	1	5	Matt Grevers	United States	49.97	Q
6	2	3	Robert Glință	Romania	49.98	Q, NR
7	2	6	Christian Diener	Germany	50.04	Q
8	1	3	Mitch Larkin	Australia	50.12	Q
9	1	6	Simone Sabbioni	Italy	50.21	
10	2	8	Andrei Shabasov	Russia	50.32	
11	2	2	Radosław Kawęcki	Poland	50.43	
12	1	2	Ryosuke Irie	Japan	50.45	
13	2	1	Guilherme Basseto	Brazil	50.83	
14	1	7	Apostolos Christou	Greece	50.91	
15	1	8	Thomas Ceccon	Italy	50.96	
16	1	1	Anton Lončar	Croatia	51.20	

=== Final ===
The final was held on 12 December at 19:08.

Rank	Lane	Name	Nationality	Time	Notes
1st place, gold medalist(s)	3	Ryan Murphy	United States	49.23	
2nd place, silver medalist(s)	4	Xu Jiayu	China	49.26	
3rd place, bronze medalist(s)	6	Kliment Kolesnikov	Russia	49.40	
4	8	Mitch Larkin	Australia	49.46	
5	5	Guilherme Guido	Brazil	49.75	
6	2	Matt Grevers	United States	50.02	
7	1	Christian Diener	Germany	50.24	
8	7	Robert Glință	Romania	50.36	
