= Swimming at the 2016 European Aquatics Championships – Men's 100 metre backstroke =

Men's 100 metre backstroke at the 2016 European Aquatics Championships
- Dates: 16–17 May
- Competitors: 51 from 23 nations
- Winning time: 53.79

Medalists
gold medal	Camille Lacourt	France
silver medal	Grigoriy Tarasevich	Russia
bronze medal	Simone Sabbioni	Italy
bronze medal	Apostolos Christou	Greece

The Men's 100 metre backstroke competition of the 2016 European Aquatics Championships was held on 16 and 17 May 2016.

== Records ==
Prior to the competition, the existing world, European and championship records were as follows.

	Name	Nation	Time	Location	Date
World record	Aaron Peirsol	United States	51.94	Indianapolis	8 July 2009
European record	Camille Lacourt	France	52.11	Budapest	10 August 2010
Championship record	Camille Lacourt	France	52.11	Budapest	10 August 2010

== Results ==
=== Heats ===
The heats were held on 16 May at 10:37.

Rank	Heat	Lane	Name	Nationality	Time	Notes
1	6	2	Robert Glință	Romania	53.43	Q, NR
2	5	6	Apostolos Christou	Greece	53.77	Q
3	5	3	Shane Ryan	Ireland	54.21	Q
4	5	5	Yakov Toumarkin	Israel	54.22	Q
5	4	4	Grigoriy Tarasevich	Russia	54.31	Q
6	6	5	Simone Sabbioni	Italy	54.54	Q
7	4	5	Radosław Kawęcki	Poland	54.63	Q
8	4	7	Guy Barnea	Israel	54.81	Q
9	4	3	Gábor Balog	Hungary	54.86	Q
10	5	4	Chris Walker-Hebborn	Great Britain	54.94	Q
11	6	4	Camille Lacourt	France	55.04	Q
12	4	2	Conor Ferguson	Ireland	55.06	Q
13	4	6	Tomasz Polewka	Poland	55.10	Q
14	5	7	David Gamburg	Israel	55.14	
14	6	3	Christopher Ciccarese	Italy	55.14	Q
16	5	1	Jonatan Kopelev	Israel	55.15	
17	6	6	Nikita Ulyanov	Russia	55.25	Q
18	4	9	Dávid Földházi	Hungary	55.37	S-off
18	6	9	Ádám Telegdy	Hungary	55.37	S-off
20	5	9	Tomáš Franta	Czech Republic	55.38	
21	4	1	Viktar Staselovich	Belarus	55.40	
22	6	1	Luke Greenbank	Great Britain	55.45	
23	6	7	Benjamin Stasiulis	France	55.52	
24	3	6	Mattias Carlsson	Sweden	55.53	
25	2	4	Petter Fredriksson	Sweden	55.76	
26	5	0	Anton Loncar	Croatia	55.83	
27	5	8	Ralf Tribuntsov	Estonia	55.92	
28	4	0	Marcin Tarczyński	Poland	56.02	
29	2	5	Marko Rabar	Croatia	56.09	
30	6	8	Carl-Louis Schwarz	Germany	56.16	
31	3	5	Gabriel Lopes	Portugal	56.17	
32	3	2	Ģirts Feldbergs	Latvia	56.22	
33	3	4	Doruk Tekin	Turkey	56.32	
34	3	7	Zámbó Balázs	Hungary	56.39	
35	3	3	Kristian Komlenić	Croatia	56.43	
36	1	4	Raphaël Stacchiotti	Luxembourg	56.48	
37	3	8	Ege Başer	Turkey	56.60	
38	2	7	Baslakov İskender	Turkey	56.66	
39	1	5	Karl Luht	Estonia	56.76	
39	6	0	Michail Kontizas	Greece	56.76	
41	2	2	Teo Kolonic	Croatia	56.79	
42	1	3	Endri Vinter	Estonia	56.80	
43	3	9	Axel Pettersson	Sweden	56.85	
44	3	0	Daniel Martin	Romania	56.91	
45	4	8	Joseph Hulme	Great Britain	57.21	
46	2	6	Nils Van Audekerke	Belgium	57.33	
47	3	1	Gytis Stankevičius	Lithuania	57.41	
48	2	0	Boris Kirillov	Azerbaijan	57.53	
49	2	1	Roman Dmitriyev	Czech Republic	57.56	
50	2	3	Pāvels Vilcāns	Latvia	58.17	
51	2	8	Andrei Gussev	Estonia	58.25	
	5	2	Danas Rapšys	Lithuania	DNS	

==== Swim-off ====
The Swim-off were held on 16 May at 12:18.

Rank	Lane	Name	Nationality	Time	Notes
1	4	Dávid Földházi	Hungary	55.26	Q
2	5	Ádám Telegdy	Hungary	55.58	

=== Semifinals ===
The semifinals were held on 16 May at 18:17.

==== Semifinal 1 ====
Rank	Lane	Name	Nationality	Time	Notes
1	4	Apostolos Christou	Greece	53.36	Q
2	3	Simone Sabbioni	Italy	53.86	Q
3	5	Yakov Toumarkin	Israel	54.18	Q
4	2	Chris Walker-Hebborn	Great Britain	54.77	
5	7	Conor Ferguson	Ireland	54.99	
6	6	Guy Barnea	Israel	55.03	
7	1	Christopher Ciccarese	Italy	55.06	
8	8	Dávid Földházi	Hungary	55.35	

==== Semifinal 2 ====
Rank	Lane	Name	Nationality	Time	Notes
1	3	Grigoriy Tarasevich	Russia	53.70	Q
2	7	Camille Lacourt	France	54.09	Q
3	4	Robert Glință	Romania	54.14	Q
4	2	Gábor Balog	Hungary	54.20	Q
5	5	Shane Ryan	Ireland	54.39	Q
6	1	Tomasz Polewka	Poland	54.43	
7	8	Nikita Ulyanov	Russia	54.48	
8	6	Radosław Kawęcki	Poland	54.64	

=== Final ===
The final was on 17 May at 18:15.

Rank	Lane	Name	Nationality	Time	Notes
1st place, gold medalist(s)	6	Camille Lacourt	France	53.79	
2nd place, silver medalist(s)	5	Grigoriy Tarasevich	Russia	53.89	
3rd place, bronze medalist(s)	3	Simone Sabbioni	Italy	54.19	
3rd place, bronze medalist(s)	4	Apostolos Christou	Greece	54.19	
5	1	Gábor Balog	Hungary	54.35	
6	2	Robert Glință	Romania	54.36	
6	7	Yakov Toumarkin	Israel	54.36	
8	8	Shane Ryan	Ireland	54.49	
