= Swimming at the 2017 Summer Universiade – Men's 50 metre backstroke =

Men's 50 metre backstroke at the 2017 Summer Universiade
- Venue: National Taiwan Sport University Arena
- Location: Taipei, Taiwan
- Dates: 22 August (heats and semifinals); 23 August (final)
- Competitors: 60 from 40 nations
- Winning time: 24.72

Medalists
gold medal	Shane Ryan	Ireland
silver medal	Justin Ress	United States
bronze medal	Won Young-jun	South Korea

The men's 50 metre backstroke competition at the 2017 Summer Universiade was held on 22 and 23 August 2017.

== Records ==
Prior to the competition, the existing world and Universiade records were as follows.

World record	Liam Tancock (GBR)	24.04	Rome, Italy	2 August 2009
Competition record	Junya Koga (JPN)	24.63	Belgrade, Serbia	8 July 2009

== Results ==
=== Heats ===
The heats were held on 22 August at 10:14.

Rank	Heat	Lane	Name	Nationality	Time	Notes
1	8	4	Justin Ress	United States	25.10	Q
2	8	3	Shane Ryan	Ireland	25.12	Q
3	7	3	Mikita Tsmyh	Belarus	25.17	Q
3	7	4	Jonatan Kopelev	Israel	25.17	Q
5	6	4	Tomasz Polewka	Poland	25.25	Q
6	6	5	Apostolos Christou	Greece	25.27	Q
7	7	5	Taylor Dale	United States	25.32	Q
8	8	5	Ben Treffers	Australia	25.38	Q
9	8	6	Nikita Ulyanov	Russia	25.44	Q
10	5	5	Dmytro Gurnytskyi	Ukraine	25.46	Q
11	7	2	Niccolò Bonacchi	Italy	25.50	Q
12	4	1	Shuhei Uno	Japan	25.53	Q
12	7	6	Viktar Staselovich	Belarus	25.53	Q
14	6	6	Matteo Milli	Italy	25.59	Q
15	8	2	Won Young-jun	South Korea	25.61	Q
16	5	4	Charles Hockin	Paraguay	25.73	Q
17	7	8	Gábor Balog	Hungary	25.75	
18	7	1	Andrey Arbuzov	Russia	25.85	
19	7	7	Henrique Martins	Brazil	25.86	
20	6	7	Guilherme Basseto	Brazil	25.91	
21	6	2	Gustav Hökfelt	Sweden	25.92	
22	8	8	Gytis Stankevičius	Lithuania	26.00	
23	6	1	Rafał Bugdol	Poland	26.06	
24	8	7	Georgios Spanoudakis	Greece	26.09	
25	5	2	Bayley Main	New Zealand	26.14	
26	6	3	Bohdan Kasian	Ukraine	26.18	
27	6	8	Bence Szentes	Hungary	26.24	
28	4	3	Adil Kaskabay	Kazakhstan	26.30	
29	3	4	Guido Buscaglia	Argentina	26.34	
30	5	1	Nicolás Deferrari	Argentina	26.38	
31	4	7	Bernhard Reitshammer	Austria	26.41	
32	4	5	Girts Feldbergs	Latvia	26.48	
33	4	6	Corneille Coetzee	New Zealand	26.51	
34	5	8	Axel Pettersson	Sweden	26.56	
35	4	4	Gabriel Lópes	Portugal	26.57	
36	3	7	Andy Song	Mexico	26.58	
37	3	1	Lau Shiu Yue	Hong Kong	26.63	
38	3	5	Chang Hou-chi	Chinese Taipei	26.72	
39	5	6	David Céspedes	Colombia	26.73	
40	2	6	Andrei Gussev	Estonia	26.75	
41	3	6	Clayton Jimmie	South Africa	26.78	
42	5	3	Oren Malka	Israel	26.80	
43	4	8	Rory Mcevoy	Ireland	26.96	
44	3	3	Chang Kuo-chi	Chinese Taipei	27.00	
45	3	8	Janne Markkanen	Finland	27.05	
46	2	4	Neil Fair	South Africa	27.17	
47	2	5	Jaakko Rautalin	Finland	27.56	
48	2	3	Daniel Mitsumasu	Peru	27.93	
49	2	1	Christian Sidler	Switzerland	28.13	
49	2	7	Pedro Chiancone	Uruguay	28.13	
51	5	7	Gorazd Chepishevski	Macedonia	28.16	
52	3	2	Nassim Aboub	Algeria	28.20	
53	2	2	Maroun Waked	Lebanon	28.91	
53	2	8	Arian Puyo	Philippines	28.91	
55	1	4	Alfredo Yaluk	Paraguay	30.32	
56	1	6	Kalana Weeramuni	Sri Lanka	30.59	
57	1	1	Daniil Latt	Estonia	32.47	
58	1	8	Salim Al-Masroori	Oman	33.02	
59	1	3	Kobe Soguilon	Philippines	33.70	
60	1	7	Murtaza Naimee	Afghanistan	45.75	
	1	2	Joseph Godbless	Nigeria	DNS	
	1	5	Amukali Oduni	Nigeria	DNS	
	4	2	Mehdi Benbara	Algeria	DNS	
	8	1	Shunichi Nakao	Japan	DNS	

=== Semifinals ===
The semifinals were held on 22 August at 20:48.

==== Semifinal 1 ====
Rank	Lane	Name	Nationality	Time	Notes
1	4	Shane Ryan	Ireland	24.97	Q
2	3	Apostolos Christou	Greece	25.20	Q
3	6	Ben Treffers	Australia	25.34	Q
4	7	Viktar Staselovich	Belarus	25.40	
5	5	Mikita Tsmyh	Belarus	25.43	
6	1	Matteo Milli	Italy	25.55	
7	2	Dmytro Gurnytskyi	Ukraine	25.59	
8	8	Charles Hockin	Paraguay	25.85	

==== Semifinal 2 ====
Rank	Lane	Name	Nationality	Time	Notes
1	3	Tomasz Polewka	Poland	25.11	Q
1	2	Nikita Ulyanov	Russia	25.11	Q
3	8	Won Young-jun	South Korea	25.13	Q
4	4	Justin Ress	United States	25.19	Q
5	6	Taylor Dale	United States	25.22	Q
6	5	Jonatan Kopelev	Israel	25.42	
7	7	Niccolò Bonacchi	Italy	25.46	
8	1	Shuhei Uno	Japan	25.55	

=== Final ===
The final was held on 23 August at 20:40.

Rank	Lane	Name	Nationality	Time	Notes
1st place, gold medalist(s)	4	Shane Ryan	Ireland	24.72	NR
2nd place, silver medalist(s)	2	Justin Ress	United States	24.73	
3rd place, bronze medalist(s)	6	Won Young-jun	South Korea	25.06	
4	1	Taylor Dale	United States	25.15	
5	3	Tomasz Polewka	Poland	25.18	
6	5	Nikita Ulyanov	Russia	25.20	
7	8	Ben Treffers	Australia	25.21	
8	7	Apostolos Christou	Greece	25.27	
