= Swimming at the 2024 European Aquatics Championships – Men's 50 metre backstroke =

Men's 50 metre backstroke at the 2024 European Aquatics Championships
- Venue: Sports Centre Milan Gale Muškatirović
- Dates: 20 June (heats and semifinals); 21 June (final)
- Competitors: 40 from 25 nations
- Winning time: 24.39

Medalists
gold medal	Apostolos Christou	Greece
silver medal	Ksawery Masiuk	Poland
bronze medal	Evangelos Makrygiannis	Greece

The Men's 50 metre backstroke competition of the 2024 European Aquatics Championships was held on 20 and 21 June 2024.

== Records ==
Prior to the competition, the existing world, European and championship records were as follows.

	Name	Nation	Time	Location	Date
World record	Kliment Kolesnikov	Russia	23.55	Kazan	27 July 2023
European record Championship record	Kliment Kolesnikov	Russia	23.80	Budapest	18 May 2021

== Results ==
=== Heats ===
The heats were started on 20 June at 10:05.
Qualification Rules: The 16 fastest from the heats qualify to the semifinals.

Rank	Heat	Lane	Name	Nationality	Time	Notes
1	3	4	Apostolos Christou	Greece	24.66	Q
2	5	5	Evangelos Makrygiannis	Greece	24.84	Q
3	4	4	Ksawery Masiuk	Poland	24.95	Q
4	3	8	Hubert Kós	Hungary	24.96	Q
5	5	6	Thierry Bollin	Switzerland	25.04	Q
6	4	7	Tomer Shuster	Israel	25.18	Q
7	5	4	Michael Laitarovsky	Israel	25.19	Q
8	3	7	Ádám Jászó	Hungary	25.22	Q
9	4	5	Oleksandr Zheltyakov	Ukraine	25.29	Q
10	3	5	Kacper Stokowski	Poland	25.41	Q
11	3	6	David Gerchik	Israel	25.46	
12	5	3	Conor Ferguson	Ireland	25.55	Q
13	5	0	Ralf Tribuntsov	Estonia	25.57	Q
14	4	3	Denis-Laurean Popescu	Romania	25.58	Q
15	3	1	Piotr Ludwiczak	Poland	25.65	
16	3	9	Dino Hasibović Sirotanović	Bosnia and Herzegovina	25.81	Q
17	3	3	Cornelius Jahn	Germany	25.82	Q
18	4	1	Robert Falborg Pedersen	Denmark	25.88	Q
19	3	2	Anastasios Kougkoulos	Greece	25.89	
20	4	2	Mert Ali Satır	Turkey	25.93	
21	2	1	Max Halbeisen	Austria	25.94	
22	4	9	Moritz Dittrich	Austria	25.96	
23	2	6	Ognjen Kovačević	Serbia	25.99	
24	5	8	Djordje Dragojlović	Serbia	26.09	
25	2	4	Kaloyan Levterov	Bulgaria	26.16	
26	2	3	Ronny Brannkarr	Finland	26.18	
27	4	0	Samuel Tornqvist	Sweden	26.19	
28	5	9	Andrea Petković	Serbia	26.20	
29	2	5	Christian Diener	Germany	26.23	
30	2	8	Artem Selin	Germany	26.37	
31	2	0	Lovro Serdarević	Croatia	26.43	
32	2	2	Nikola Dokmanović	Serbia	26.51	
33	5	1	Adam Maraana	Israel	26.57	
34	1	4	Anže Ferš Eržen	Slovenia	26.62	
35	2	9	Ronens Kermans	Latvia	26.88	
35	3	0	Jack Skerry	Great Britain	26.88	
37	1	5	Zhulian Lavdaniti	Albania	27.17	
38	1	3	Andrej Stojanovski	North Macedonia	27.63	
39	1	1	Olli Kokko	Finland	27.81	
40	1	6	Rashad Alguliev	Azerbaijan	27.86	
	1	2	Ari-Pekka Liukkonen	Finland	DNS	
	1	7	Kalle Mäkinen	Finland	DNS	
	2	7	Lars Kuljus	Estonia	DNS	
	4	6	Björn Seeliger	Sweden	DNS	
	4	8	Ádám Telegdy	Hungary	DNS	
	5	2	Shane Ryan	Ireland	DNS	
	5	7	Benedek Kovács	Hungary	DNS	

=== Semifinals ===
The semifinals were started on 20 June at 19:00.
Qualification Rules: The first 2 competitors of each semifinal and the remaining fastest (up to a total of 8 qualified competitors) from the semifinals advance to the final.

Rank	Heat	Lane	Name	Nationality	Time	Notes
1	2	4	Apostolos Christou	Greece	24.52	Q
2	2	5	Ksawery Masiuk	Poland	24.72	Q
3	1	4	Evangelos Makrygiannis	Greece	24.73	Q
4	2	6	Michael Laitarovsky	Israel	24.87	Q
5	1	7	Ralf Tribuntsov	Estonia	24.89	Q, NR
6	1	6	Ádám Jászó	Hungary	24.97	Q
7	2	7	Conor Ferguson	Ireland	25.01	Q
8	1	5	Hubert Kós	Hungary	25.07	Q
9	2	2	Oleksandr Zheltyakov	Ukraine	25.21	
10	2	3	Thierry Bollin	Switzerland	25.33	
11	2	8	Cornelius Jahn	Germany	25.38	
12	1	3	Tomer Shuster	Israel	25.39	
13	1	2	Kacper Stokowski	Poland	25.43	
14	1	8	Robert Falborg Pedersen	Denmark	25.53	
15	1	1	Dino Hasibović Sirotanović	Bosnia and Herzegovina	26.09	
16	2	1	Denis-Laurean Popescu	Romania	26.81	

=== Final ===
The final was held on 21 June at 19:54.

Rank	Lane	Name	Nationality	Time	Notes
1st place, gold medalist(s)	4	Apostolos Christou	Greece	24.39	
2nd place, silver medalist(s)	5	Ksawery Masiuk	Poland	24.63	
3rd place, bronze medalist(s)	3	Evangelos Makrygiannis	Greece	24.74	
4	6	Michael Laitarovsky	Israel	24.76	
5	8	Hubert Kós	Hungary	24.85	
6	1	Conor Ferguson	Ireland	24.87	
7	7	Ádám Jászó	Hungary	24.91	
8	2	Ralf Tribuntsov	Estonia	25.18	
