= Swimming at the 2024 European Aquatics Championships – Men's 100 metre backstroke =

Men's 100 metre backstroke at the 2024 European Aquatics Championships
- Venue: Sports Centre Milan Gale Muškatirović
- Dates: 22 June (heats and semifinals); 23 June (final)
- Competitors: 41 from 22 nations
- Winning time: 52.23

Medalists
gold medal	Apostolos Christou	Greece
silver medal	Evangelos Makrygiannis	Greece
bronze medal	Ksawery Masiuk	Poland

The Men's 100 metre backstroke competition of the 2024 European Aquatics Championships was held on 22 and 23 June 2024.

== Records ==
Prior to the competition, the existing world, European and championship records were as follows.

	Name	Nationality	Time	Location	Date
World record	Thomas Ceccon	Italy	51.60	Budapest	20 June 2022
European record	Thomas Ceccon	Italy	51.60	Budapest	20 June 2022
Championship record	Camille Lacourt	France	52.11	Budapest	10 August 2010

== Results ==
=== Heats ===
The heats were started on 22 June at 09:56.
Qualification Rules: The 16 fastest from the heats qualify to the semifinals.

Rank	Heat	Lane	Name	Nationality	Time	Notes
1	3	3	Kacper Stokowski	Poland	54.04	Q
2	4	4	Ksawery Masiuk	Poland	54.28	Q
3	3	4	Ádám Jászó	Hungary	54.49	Q
4	3	2	Matthew Ward	Great Britain	54.56	Q
5	4	3	Oleksandr Zheltiakov	Ukraine	54.60	Q
6	4	6	Conor Ferguson	Ireland	54.74	Q
=7	3	6	Jakub Majerski	Poland	54.86	
=7	5	4	Apostolos Christou	Greece	54.86	Q
9	5	8	Michael Laitarovsky	Israel	54.94	Q
10	3	5	Thierry Bollin	Switzerland	54.96	Q
11	5	5	Evangelos Makrygiannis	Greece	55.09	Q
=12	4	1	Jack Skerry	Great Britain	55.11	Q
=12	4	2	Cornelius Jahn	Germany	55.11	Q
14	4	5	Adam Maraana	Israel	55.18	Q
15	5	2	Denis-Laurean Popescu	Romania	55.65	Q
16	3	1	Tomer Shuster	Israel	55.67	
17	4	8	Inbar Danziger	Israel	55.74	
18	3	9	Noah Verreth	Belgium	55.79	Q
19	4	7	Markus Lie	Norway	55.97	Q
20	5	0	Kaloyan Levterov	Bulgaria	56.08	
21	3	0	Radosław Kawęcki	Poland	56.14	
22	5	9	Moritz Dittrich	Austria	56.24	
23	3	8	Christian Diener	Germany	56.31	
24	2	3	Ognjen Kovačević	Serbia	56.44	
25	2	4	Flavio Bucca	Switzerland	56.52	
26	5	7	Mert Ali Satir	Turkey	56.73	
27	1	4	Luka Jovanović	Serbia	57.03	
28	2	5	Robert Falborg Pedersen	Denmark	57.19	
29	2	8	Primož Šenica Pavletič	Slovenia	57.21	
30	2	2	Nikola Dokmanović	Serbia	57.55	
31	4	9	Đorđe Dragojlović	Serbia	57.57	
32	2	6	Dino Hasibović Sirotanović	Bosnia and Herzegovina	57.91	
33	2	7	Mak Nurkić Kačapor	Bosnia and Herzegovina	57.98	
34	2	1	Zhulian Lavdaniti	Albania	58.37	
35	1	3	Rashad Alguliev	Azerbaijan	59.00	
36	1	5	Grisi Koxhaku	Albania	59.27	
	3	7	Bernhard Reitshammer	Austria	Did not start	
	4	0	Samuel Törnqvist	Sweden	Did not start	
	5	1	Simon Bucher	Austria	Did not start	
	5	3	Benedek Kovács	Hungary	Did not start	
	5	6	Ádám Telegdy	Hungary	Did not start	

=== Semifinals ===
The semifinal were started on 22 June at 20:14.
Qualification Rules: The first 2 competitors of each semifinal and the remaining fastest (up to a total of 8 qualified competitors) from the semifinals advance to the final.

Rank	Heat	Lane	Name	Nationality	Time	Notes
1	2	3	Apostolos Christou	Greece	53.20	Q
2	2	5	Evangelos Makrygiannis	Greece	53.31	Q
3	2	4	Ksawery Masiuk	Poland	53.54	Q
4	2	6	Kacper Stokowski	Poland	53.85	Q
5	1	5	Oleksandr Zheltiakov	Ukraine	53.98	Q
6	1	3	Conor Ferguson	Ireland	54.12	Q
7	1	4	Ádám Jászó	Hungary	54.25	Q
8	1	6	Matthew Ward	Great Britain	54.48	Q
9	1	7	Michael Laitarovsky	Israel	54.58	
10	1	2	Cornelius Jahn	Germany	54.68	
11	2	2	Thierry Bollin	Switzerland	54.83	
12	2	7	Jack Skerry	Great Britain	54.99	
13	2	1	Markus Lie	Norway	55.47	
14	2	8	Denis-Laurean Popescu	Romania	55.85	
15	1	1	Adam Maraana	Israel	55.97	
16	1	8	Noah Verreth	Belgium	56.58	

=== Final ===
The final was held on 23 June at 18:40.

Rank	Lane	Name	Nationality	Time	Notes
1st place, gold medalist(s)	4	Apostolos Christou	Greece	52.23	
2nd place, silver medalist(s)	5	Evangelos Makrygiannis	Greece	52.83	
3rd place, bronze medalist(s)	3	Ksawery Masiuk	Poland	53.56	
4	2	Oleksandr Zheltiakov	Ukraine	53.85	
5	6	Kacper Stokowski	Poland	53.90	
6	7	Ádám Jászó	Hungary	54.56	
7	1	Matthew Ward	Great Britain	54.93	
8	8	Michael Laitarovsky	Israel	55.23	
