= Swimming at the 2019 World Aquatics Championships – Men's 100 metre backstroke =

Men's 100 metre backstroke at the 2019 World Aquatics Championships
- Venue: Nambu University Municipal Aquatics Center
- Location: Gwangju, South Korea
- Dates: 22 July (heats and semifinals); 23 July (final)
- Competitors: 63 from 57 nations
- Winning time: 52.43

Medalists
gold medal	Xu Jiayu	China
silver medal	Evgeny Rylov	Russia
bronze medal	Mitch Larkin	Australia

The Men's 100 metre backstroke competition at the 2019 World Championships was held on 22 and 23 July 2019. The defending champion was Xu Jiayu, and he successfully defended his title. Jiayu set a competition record in the semifinals by winning his semifinal in 52.17 seconds.

== Records ==
Prior to the competition, the existing world and championship records were as follows.

World record	Ryan Murphy (USA)	51.85	Rio de Janeiro, Brazil	13 August 2016
Competition record	Aaron Peirsol (USA)	52.19	Rome, Italy	2 August 2009

The following new records were set during this competition.

Date	Event	Name	Nationality	Time	Record
22 July	Semifinal	Xu Jiayu	China	52.17	CR

== Results ==
=== Heats ===
The heats were held on 22 July at 10:20.

Due to backstroke wedge malfunctions, Simone Sabbioni and Dylan Carter swam alone in new series, after the end of the normal series, and both achieved classification. The swimmers who had obtained the vacancy, and would be disqualified after these 2 series (Thomas Ceccon and Richárd Bohus), received extra vacancies for the semifinal, that ended up being with 18 swimmers.

Rank	Heat	Lane	Name	Nationality	Time	Notes
1	6	4	Xu Jiayu	China	52.85	Q
2	5	2	Guilherme Guido	Brazil	52.95	Q, SA
3	5	4	Mitch Larkin	Australia	53.12	Q
4	5	5	Matt Grevers	United States	53.22	Q
5	6	5	Ryosuke Irie	Japan	53.38	Q
6	7	3	Evgeny Rylov	Russia	53.45	Q
7	6	3	Robert Glință	Romania	53.64	Q
8	6	6	Daniel Martin	Romania	53.65	Q
9	7	4	Ryan Murphy	United States	53.69	Q
10	5	3	Markus Thormeyer	Canada	53.77	Q
11	6	0	Mikita Tsmyh	Belarus	53.81	Q, NR
12	7	2	Apostolos Christou	Greece	53.82	Q
13	8	5	Simone Sabbioni	Italy	53.85	Q
14	7	5	Kliment Kolesnikov	Russia	53.89	Q
15	5	7	Luke Greenbank	Great Britain	53.95	Q
16	9	8	Dylan Carter	Trinidad and Tobago	54.03	Q, NR
17	5	6	Thomas Ceccon	Italy	54.04	Q
18	6	8	Richárd Bohus	Hungary	54.07	Q
19	7	1	Christopher Reid	South Africa	54.12	
20	7	0	Tomáš Franta	Czech Republic	54.16	NR
21	6	2	Shane Ryan	Ireland	54.24	
22	5	1	Li Guangyuan	China	54.29	
22	7	8	Yakov Toumarkin	Israel	54.29	
24	7	7	Bradley Woodward	Australia	54.41	
25	5	0	Lee Ju-ho	South Korea	54.56	
26	6	1	Christian Diener	Germany	54.68	
27	7	9	Radosław Kawęcki	Poland	54.76	
28	4	4	Roman Mityukov	Switzerland	54.87	
29	6	7	Bernhard Reitshammer	Austria	54.94	
30	6	9	Bradlee Ashby	New Zealand	55.02	
31	4	2	Gabriel Lópes	Portugal	55.33	
32	3	7	Merdan Ataýew	Turkmenistan	55.34	
33	4	1	Metin Aydin	Turkey	55.40	
34	4	3	Tomoe Zenimoto Hvas	Norway	55.42	
35	4	6	Anton Loncar	Croatia	55.44	
36	4	0	Srihari Nataraj	India	55.55	
37	5	9	Hugo González	Spain	55.67	
38	3	5	Karl Johann Luht	Estonia	55.75	
39	4	9	Mohamed Samy	Egypt	55.87	
40	3	4	Adil Kaskabay	Kazakhstan	55.89	
41	4	7	Chuang Mu-lun	Chinese Taipei	56.01	
42	3	6	Jack Kirby	Barbados	56.25	
43	3	3	Ģirts Feldbergs	Latvia	56.34	
44	4	5	Omar Pinzón	Colombia	56.37	
45	3	1	Jason Arthur	Ghana	56.86	
46	3	8	Kristinn Þórarinsson	Iceland	56.99	
47	4	8	Armando Barrera	Cuba	57.00	
48	3	0	Tern Tern Jian Han	Malaysia	57.34	
49	2	4	Filippos Iakovidis	Cyprus	58.26	
50	2	6	Gabriel Castillo	Bolivia	58.47	
51	2	9	Ali Al-Zamil	Kuwait	58.63	
52	3	2	Robinson Molina	Venezuela	59.08	
53	2	3	Kasipat Chograthin	Thailand	59.10	
54	2	5	Dimuth Peiris	Sri Lanka	59.62	
55	2	2	Syed Tariq	Pakistan	59.71	
56	2	8	Netani Ross	Fiji	1:00.30	
57	2	7	Eisner Barberena	Nicaragua	1:00.56	
58	1	3	Heriniavo Rasolonjatovo	Madagascar	1:00.87	
59	2	1	Ado Gargović	Montenegro	1:01.37	
60	1	5	Omar Al-Rowaila	Bahrain	1:02.96	
61	2	0	Juhn Tenorio	Northern Mariana Islands	1:04.91	
62	1	4	Juwel Ahmmed	Bangladesh	1:05.00	
63	1	6	Hedayatullah Noorzad	Afghanistan	1:31.35	
	3	9	Driss Lahrichi	Morocco	DNS	

=== Semifinals ===
The semifinals were held on 22 July at 20:18.

==== Semifinal 1 ====
Rank	Lane	Name	Nationality	Time	Notes
1	3	Evgeny Rylov	Russia	52.44	Q, NR
2	5	Matt Grevers	United States	52.82	Q
3	4	Guilherme Guido	Brazil	53.23	Q
4	1	Kliment Kolesnikov	Russia	53.44	
5	7	Apostolos Christou	Greece	53.56	
6	2	Markus Thormeyer	Canada	53.59	
7	6	Daniel Martin	Romania	53.71	
8	0	Richárd Bohus	Hungary	53.94	
9	8	Dylan Carter	Trinidad and Tobago	54.08	

==== Semifinal 2 ====
Rank	Lane	Name	Nationality	Time	Notes
1	4	Xu Jiayu	China	52.17	Q, CR
2	2	Ryan Murphy	United States	52.44	Q
3	5	Mitch Larkin	Australia	52.91	Q
4	3	Ryosuke Irie	Japan	53.13	Q
5	6	Robert Glință	Romania	53.40	Q
6	1	Simone Sabbioni	Italy	53.71	
7	8	Luke Greenbank	Great Britain	53.75	
8	0	Thomas Ceccon	Italy	54.20	
9	7	Mikita Tsmyh	Belarus	54.24	

=== Final ===
The final was held on 23 July at 21:06.

Rank	Lane	Name	Nationality	Time	Notes
1st place, gold medalist(s)	4	Xu Jiayu	China	52.43	
2nd place, silver medalist(s)	5	Evgeny Rylov	Russia	52.67	
3rd place, bronze medalist(s)	2	Mitch Larkin	Australia	52.77	
4	3	Ryan Murphy	United States	52.78	
5	6	Matt Grevers	United States	52.82	
6	7	Ryosuke Irie	Japan	53.22	
7	1	Guilherme Guido	Brazil	53.26	
8	8	Robert Glință	Romania	54.22	
