= Swimming at the 2023 World Aquatics Championships – Men's 50 metre backstroke =

Men's 50 metre backstroke at the 2023 World Aquatics Championships
- Venue: Marine Messe Fukuoka
- Location: Fukuoka, Japan
- Dates: 29 July (heats and semifinals); 30 July (final)
- Competitors: 64 from 59 nations
- Winning time: 24.05

Medalists
gold medal	Hunter Armstrong	United States
silver medal	Justin Ress	United States
bronze medal	Xu Jiayu	China

The men's 50 metre backstroke competition at the 2023 World Aquatics Championships was held on 29 and 30 July 2023.

== Records ==
Prior to the competition, the existing world and championship records were as follows.

World record	Hunter Armstrong (USA)	23.71	Greensboro, United States	28 April 2022
Competition record	Liam Tancock (GBR)	24.04	Rome, Italy	2 August 2009

== Results ==
=== Heats ===
The heats were started on 29 July at 10:55.

Rank	Heat	Lane	Name	Nationality	Time	Notes
1	6	4	Justin Ress	United States	24.18	Q
2	5	4	Apostolos Christou	Greece	24.48	Q
3	7	4	Hunter Armstrong	United States	24.49	Q
4	5	5	Ksawery Masiuk	Poland	24.71	Q
5	6	3	Ole Braunschweig	Germany	24.72	Q
6	7	3	Xu Jiayu	China	24.73	Q
6	7	5	Isaac Cooper	Australia	24.73	Q
8	6	5	Thomas Ceccon	Italy	24.80	Q
9	6	2	Andrei-Mircea Anghel	Romania	24.86	Q
10	5	7	Kacper Stokowski	Poland	24.91	Q
11	5	3	Andrew Jeffcoat	New Zealand	24.95	Q
11	6	7	Conor Ferguson	Ireland	24.95	Q
13	7	2	Takeshi Kawamoto	Japan	25.05	Q
14	4	5	Yassin Hossam	Egypt	25.07	Q
15	5	1	Michael Laitarovsky	Israel	25.10	Q
16	5	6	Ryosuke Irie	Japan	25.11	Q
17	6	9	Lamar Taylor	Bahamas	25.12	
18	6	0	Adrian Santos	Spain	25.15	
19	5	2	Javier Acevedo	Canada	25.18	
19	7	8	Won Young-jun	South Korea	25.18	
21	7	6	Guilherme Basseto	Brazil	25.22	
22	5	9	João Costa	Portugal	25.28	NR
23	7	1	Wang Gukailai	China	25.29	
24	7	7	Tomáš Franta	Czech Republic	25.35	
25	6	6	Björn Seeliger	Sweden	25.38	
26	6	8	Hugo González	Spain	25.42	
27	4	3	Chuang Mu-lun	Chinese Taipei	25.50	
28	7	9	Srihari Nataraj	India	25.51	
29	4	8	Markus Lie	Norway	25.55	
30	6	1	Áron Székely	Hungary	25.59	
31	7	0	Roman Mityukov	Switzerland	25.61	
32	4	4	Quah Zheng Wen	Singapore	25.76	
33	3	2	Remi Fabiani	Luxembourg	25.87	
33	5	0	I Gede Siman Sudartawa	Indonesia	25.87	
35	4	7	Ģirts Feldbergs	Latvia	25.93	
36	4	2	Charles Hockin	Paraguay	25.96	
37	4	1	Clayton Jimmie	South Africa	25.97	
38	3	5	Diego Camacho	Mexico	26.04	
39	3	1	Jack Kirby	Barbados	26.17	
40	3	6	Tonnam Kanteemool	Thailand	26.39	
41	4	6	Jerard Jacinto	Suspended Member Federation	26.41	
42	4	0	Filippos Iakovidis	Cyprus	26.42	
43	3	8	Maximillian Wilson	U.S. Virgin Islands	26.62	
44	4	9	Noe Pantskhava	Georgia	26.63	
45	3	3	Homer Abbasi	Iran	26.70	
45	3	7	Lau Shiu Yue	Hong Kong	26.70	
47	1	4	Isaiah Aleksenko	Northern Mariana Islands	26.94	
47	3	0	Enkhtur Erkhes	Mongolia	26.94	NR
49	2	3	Hansel McCaig	Fiji	26.97	NR
50	2	4	Andrej Stojanovski	North Macedonia	27.35	NR
51	1	6	Tameea Elhamayda	Qatar	27.41	
52	3	9	Warren Lawrence	Dominica	27.45	
53	2	2	Mohamad Zubaid	Kuwait	27.64	
54	2	5	Bede Aitu	Cook Islands	28.19	
55	2	6	Jeno Heyns	Suriname	28.30	
56	2	7	Tajhari Williams	Turks and Caicos Islands	29.44	
57	1	7	Omer Huraish	Iraq	29.88	
58	1	2	Kapeli Siua	Tonga	29.96	
59	2	1	Swaleh Talib	Suspended Member Federation	30.03	
60	2	9	Troy Pino	Cape Verde	30.85	
61	2	8	Alexander Fleming-Lake	Anguilla	30.89	
62	2	0	Mohamed Shiham	Maldives	31.44	
63	1	5	Giorgio Nguichie Kamseu Kamogne	Cameroon	33.75	
64	1	3	Hamzah Mayas	Yemen	39.35	
	1	1	Ibrahim Kamara	Sierra Leone	Did not start	
	3	4	Dylan Carter	Trinidad and Tobago	Did not start	
	5	8	Bradley Woodward	Australia	Did not start	

=== Semifinals ===
The semifinal was held on 29 July at 21:06.

Rank	Heat	Lane	Name	Nationality	Time	Notes
1	2	4	Justin Ress	United States	24.35	Q
2	1	3	Xu Jiayu	China	24.41	Q, NR
2	2	5	Hunter Armstrong	United States	24.41	Q
4	1	5	Ksawery Masiuk	Poland	24.47	Q
5	1	4	Apostolos Christou	Greece	24.57	Q
5	1	6	Thomas Ceccon	Italy	24.57	Q
7	2	3	Ole Braunschweig	Germany	24.73	Q
8	2	7	Andrew Jeffcoat	New Zealand	24.81	Q
9	2	6	Isaac Cooper	Australia	24.86	
10	2	2	Andrei-Mircea Anghel	Romania	24.95	
11	1	2	Kacper Stokowski	Poland	24.99	
11	2	8	Michael Laitarovsky	Israel	24.99	
13	1	7	Conor Ferguson	Ireland	25.09	
14	2	1	Takeshi Kawamoto	Japan	25.14	
15	1	8	Ryosuke Irie	Japan	25.21	
16	1	1	Yassin Hossam	Egypt	25.22	

=== Final ===
The final will be held on 30 July at 20:02.

Rank	Lane	Name	Nationality	Time	Notes
1st place, gold medalist(s)	3	Hunter Armstrong	United States	24.05	
2nd place, silver medalist(s)	4	Justin Ress	United States	24.24	
3rd place, bronze medalist(s)	5	Xu Jiayu	China	24.50	
4	6	Ksawery Masiuk	Poland	24.57	
5	7	Thomas Ceccon	Italy	24.58	
6	2	Apostolos Christou	Greece	24.60	
7	8	Andrew Jeffcoat	New Zealand	24.66	
8	1	Ole Braunschweig	Germany	24.93	
