= Afghanistan at the 2017 Summer Universiade =

- IOC code: AFG
- NOC: Afghanistan National Olympic Committee

in Taipei, Taiwan 19 – 30 August 2017
- Competitors: 3 in 2 sports
- Medals: Gold 0 Silver 0 Bronze 0 Total 0

Summer Universiade appearances
- 1959; 1961; 1963; 1965; 1967; 1970; 1973; 1975; 1977; 1979; 1981; 1983; 1985; 1987; 1989; 1991; 1993; 1995; 1997; 1999; 2001; 2003; 2005; 2007; 2009; 2011; 2013; 2015; 2017; 2019; 2021; 2025; 2027

Afghanistan participated at the 2017 Summer Universiade in Taipei, Taiwan with 3 competitors in 2 sports, swimming and wushu.

== Competitors ==
The following table lists Afghanistan's delegation per sport and gender.

Sport	Men	Women	Total
Swimming	2	0	2
Wushu	1	0	1
Total	3	0	3

== Swimming ==
Men

Athlete	Event	Heat		Semifinal		Final	
Athlete	Event	Time	Rank	Time	Rank	Time	Rank
Murtaza Naimee	50 metre backstroke	45.75	60	did not advance			
Murtaza Naimee	50 metre freestyle	33.40	81	did not advance			
Ali Asghar Nazari	50 metre butterfly	DNS	—N/a	did not advance			
Ali Asghar Nazari	100 metre freestyle	1:05.99	93	did not advance			

== Wushu ==
One Afghan wushu practitioner, Mohammad Hasib Mohsini, competed in the men's sanda (Chinese kickboxing) 60 kg event. He was defeated in the first match by Lucas Luciano Queiroz Pereira of Brazil, who won both rounds.

Men's sanda

Athlete	Event	Preliminary	Quarterfinal	Semifinal	Final / BM	
Athlete	Event	Opposition Result	Opposition Result	Opposition Result	Opposition Result	Rank
Mohammad Hasib Mohsini	Men's sanda 60 kg	Lucas Luciano Queiroz Pereira (BRA); L 0–2	did not advance			
