= Zane Waddell =

South African swimmer (born 1998)

Personal information
- Nationality: South African
- Born: 18 March 1998 (age 28) Bloemfontein, South Africa
- Height: 1.94 m (6 ft 4 in)
- Weight: 92 kg (203 lb)

Sport
- Sport: Swimming
- Strokes: Backstroke, freestyle
- College team: University of Alabama
Medal record
Men's swimming
Representing South Africa
World Championships (LC)
Gold medal – first place	2019 Gwangju	50 m backstroke
Summer Universiade
Gold medal – first place	2019 Naples	50 m backstroke

Zane Waddell (born 18 March 1998) is a South African swimmer. He competed in the men's 100 metre freestyle event at the 2017 World Aquatics Championships. Waddell won Gold in the 50 metres backstroke event at the 2019 World Aquatics Championships.
