= Anguilla at the 2025 World Aquatics Championships =

- Flag of Anguilla
- World Aquatics code: AIA
- National federation: Anguilla Amateur Swimming Association

in Singapore
- Competitors: 1 in 1 sport
- Medals: Gold 0 Silver 0 Bronze 0 Total 0

World Aquatics Championships appearances
- 2023; 2024; 2025

Anguilla competed at the 2025 World Aquatics Championships in Singapore from 11 July to 3 August 2025.

== Competitors ==
The following is the list of competitors in the Championships.

Sport	Men	Women	Total
Swimming	1	0	1
Total	1	0	1

== Swimming ==
Men

Athlete	Event	Heat		Semifinal		Final	
Athlete	Event	Time	Rank	Time	Rank	Time	Rank
Jonathan Irizarry	50 m freestyle	37.68	116	Did not advance			
Jonathan Irizarry	50 m breaststroke	45.70	79	Did not advance			
