= Anguilla at the 2023 World Aquatics Championships =

- Flag of Anguilla
- World Aquatics code: AIA
- National federation: Anguilla Amateur Swimming Association

in Fukuoka, Japan
- Competitors: 1 in 1 sport
- Medals: Gold 0 Silver 0 Bronze 0 Total 0

World Aquatics Championships appearances
- 2023; 2024; 2025

Anguilla is set to compete at the 2023 World Aquatics Championships in Fukuoka, Japan from 14 to 30 July.

== Swimming ==
Anguilla entered 1 swimmer.

Men

Athlete	Event	Heat		Semifinal		Final	
Athlete	Event	Time	Rank	Time	Rank	Time	Rank
Alexander Fleming Lake	50 metre freestyle	26.23	97	Did not advance			
Alexander Fleming Lake	50 metre backstroke	30.89	61	Did not advance			
