= Evangelos Makrygiannis =

Greek swimmer (born 2000)

Personal information
- Nationality: Greece
- Born: 18 June 2000 (age 26) Athens, Greece
- Height: 1.93 m (6 ft 4 in)

Sport
- Sport: Swimming
- Event: backstroke
Medal record
Men's swimming
Representing Greece
European Championships (LC)
| Silver medal – second place | 2024 Belgrade | 100 m backstroke |
| Bronze medal – third place | 2024 Belgrade | 50 m backstroke |
| Bronze medal – third place | 2024 Belgrade | 4x100 m freestyle |
European U-23 Championships
| Silver medal – second place | 2023 Dublin | 50 m backstroke |
| Bronze medal – third place | 2023 Dublin | 100 m backstroke |
Mediterranean Games
| Gold medal – first place | 2022 Oran | 100 m backstroke |
| Gold medal – first place | 2022 Oran | 4×200 m freestyle |
| Silver medal – second place | 2026 Taranto | 4×100 m mixed medley |
| Bronze medal – third place | 2026 Taranto | 100 m backstroke |

Evangelos Makrygiannis (born 18 June 2000) is a Greek swimmer. He competed in the 2020 Summer Olympics.
