= Venezuela at the 2019 World Aquatics Championships =

- Flag of Venezuela
- World Aquatics code: VEN
- National federation: Venezuelan Water Sports Federation
- Website: feveda.org.ve (in Spanish)

in Gwangju, South Korea
- Competitors: 10 in 3 sports
- Medals: Gold 0 Silver 0 Bronze 0 Total 0

World Aquatics Championships appearances
- 1973; 1975; 1978; 1982; 1986; 1991; 1994; 1998; 2001; 2003; 2005; 2007; 2009; 2011; 2013; 2015; 2017; 2019; 2022; 2023; 2024; 2025

Venezuela competed at the 2019 World Aquatics Championships in Gwangju, South Korea from 12 to 28 July.

== Diving ==
Venezuela entered three divers.

Men

| Athlete | Event | Preliminaries | | Semifinals | | Final | |
| Athlete | Event | Points | Rank | Points | Rank | Points | Rank |
|---|---|---|---|---|---|---|---|
| Oscar Ariza | 10 m platform | 334.50 | 28 | did not advance | | | |

Women

| Athlete | Event | Preliminaries | | Semifinals | | Final | |
| Athlete | Event | Points | Rank | Points | Rank | Points | Rank |
|---|---|---|---|---|---|---|---|
| María Betancourt | 10 m platform | 199.10 | 35 | did not advance | | | |

Mixed

| Athlete | Event | Final | |
| Athlete | Event | Points | Rank |
|---|---|---|---|
| Oscar Ariza; María Betancourt | Team event | 294.00 | 14 |

== Open water swimming ==
Venezuela qualified two male and two female open water swimmers.

Men

| Athlete | Event | Time | Rank |
|---|---|---|---|
| Wilder Carreno | 5 km | 53:53.1 | 35 |
| Wilder Carreno | 10 km | 1:52:53.5 | 55 |
| Diego Vera | 10 km | 1:50:15.6 | 36 |

Women

| Athlete | Event | Time | Rank |
|---|---|---|---|
| Liliana Hernández | 5 km | 1:01:39.2 | 37 |
| Liliana Hernández | 10 km | 2:07:38.4 | 49 |
| Paola Pérez | 5 km | 1:01:39.4 | 39 |
| Paola Pérez | 10 km | 2:01:29.7 | 42 |

Mixed

| Athlete | Event | Time | Rank |
|---|---|---|---|
| Liliana Hernández; Wilder Carreno; Paola Pérez; Diego Vera | Team | 59:01.0 | 19 |

== Swimming ==
Venezuela has entered three swimmers.

Men

| Athlete | Event | Heat | | Semifinal | | Final | |
| Athlete | Event | Time | Rank | Time | Rank | Time | Rank |
|---|---|---|---|---|---|---|---|
| Robinson Molina | 50 m backstroke | 26.48 | =46 | did not advance | | | |
| Robinson Molina | 100 m backstroke | 59.08 | 52 | did not advance | | | |
| Cristian Quintero | 100 m freestyle | 49.40 | 30 | did not advance | | | |
| Cristian Quintero | 200 m freestyle | 1:48.10 | 24 | did not advance | | | |

Women

| Athlete | Event | Heat | | Semifinal | | Final | |
| Athlete | Event | Time | Rank | Time | Rank | Time | Rank |
|---|---|---|---|---|---|---|---|
| Isabella Paez | 100 m butterfly | 1:01.27 | 36 | did not advance | | | |
