= Yuma Edo =

Japanese swimmer

Personal information
- Nationality: Japanese
- Born: 30 November 1993 (age 32)

Sport
- Sport: Swimming

Yuma Edo (born 30 November 1993) is a Japanese swimmer. He competed in the men's 100 metre backstroke event at the 2018 FINA World Swimming Championships (25 m), in Hangzhou, China.
