= Cătălin Ungur =

Romanian swimmer (born 1994)

Cătălin Paul Ungur
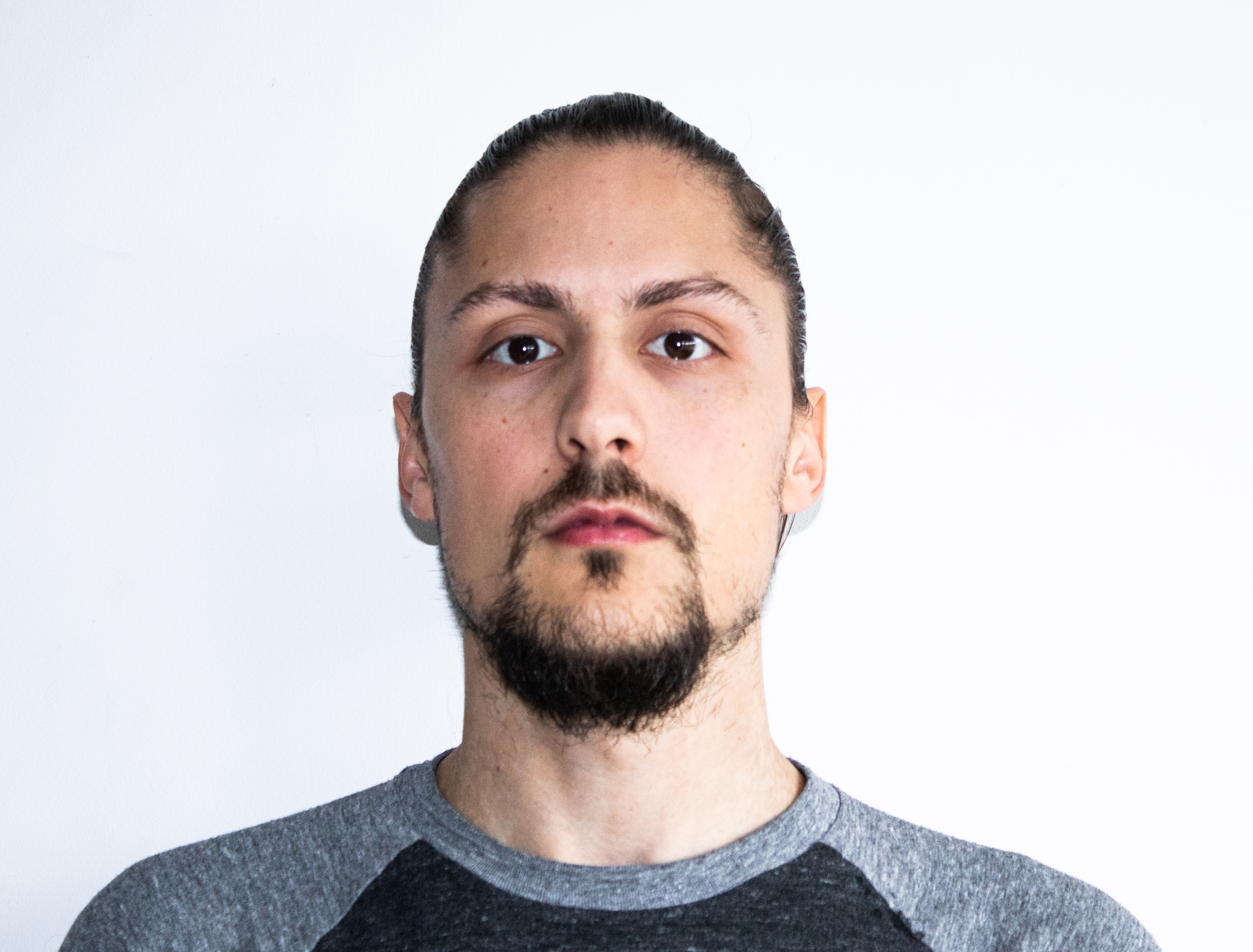
- Ungur Catalin in 2023

Personal information
- Nationality: Romania
- Born: 1 August 1994 (age 31) Baia Mare, Romania
- Height: 178 cm (5 ft 10 in)
- Weight: 68 kg (150 lb)

Sport
- Sport: Swimming
- Strokes: Backstroke, Butterfly
- Club: CS Seini
- College team: University of Utah

Cătălin Paul Ungur (born 1 August 1994) is a coach, and former swimmer from Romania. He currently holds the Romanian record in the short course 50 meter butterfly. He represented Romania internationally at the 2017 European Short Course Swimming Championships, 2018 FINA World Swimming Championships (25 m), 2019 Summer Universiade, and 2019 European Short Course Swimming Championships.

== Swimming career ==
Collegiate Career - Swimmer - Carson–Newman University, University of Utah

2014-2015

Ungur joined Carson–Newman University as a freshman. He finished 3rd in the 100m backstroke at the 2015 NCAA Division II men's swimming and diving championships.

2015-2018

He transferred to University of Utah where he finished his NCAA collegiate career. While swimming for the Utes, in 2018 Ungur won the Pac-12 Conference title in the 100m backstroke for a three-way tie alongside Robert Glință and Ralf Tribuntsov. One month later, he posted the fastest time in NCAA during the 2017–2018 season in the 50m backstroke. At that point in time, it was the 3rd fastest 50 backstroke in the history of the event.

International Championships - Representing Romania

At the 2017 European Short Course Swimming Championships, held at Royal Arena in December in Copenhagen, Ungur achieved a 7th-place finish in the 50 meters Backstroke, semi-finaled placing 13th in the 100m backstroke, and setting the current national record of Romania in the 50m butterfly.

At the 2018 FINA World Swimming Championships (25 m), in Hangzhou, Ungur placed 18th in the 50m backstroke

== Coaching career ==
Ungur started his coaching career for Olympus High School as part of their club team, Olympus Aquatics. In 2020 due to the COVID-19 pandemic, he moved back to Romania and started coaching at CS Seini, a rural club from Seini. In 2023, Ungur got his first international medal through his brother Andrei Ungur, who placed 3rd at the 2023 European Short Course Swimming Championships in the 100m backstroke.
