= Camille Lacourt =

French swimmer

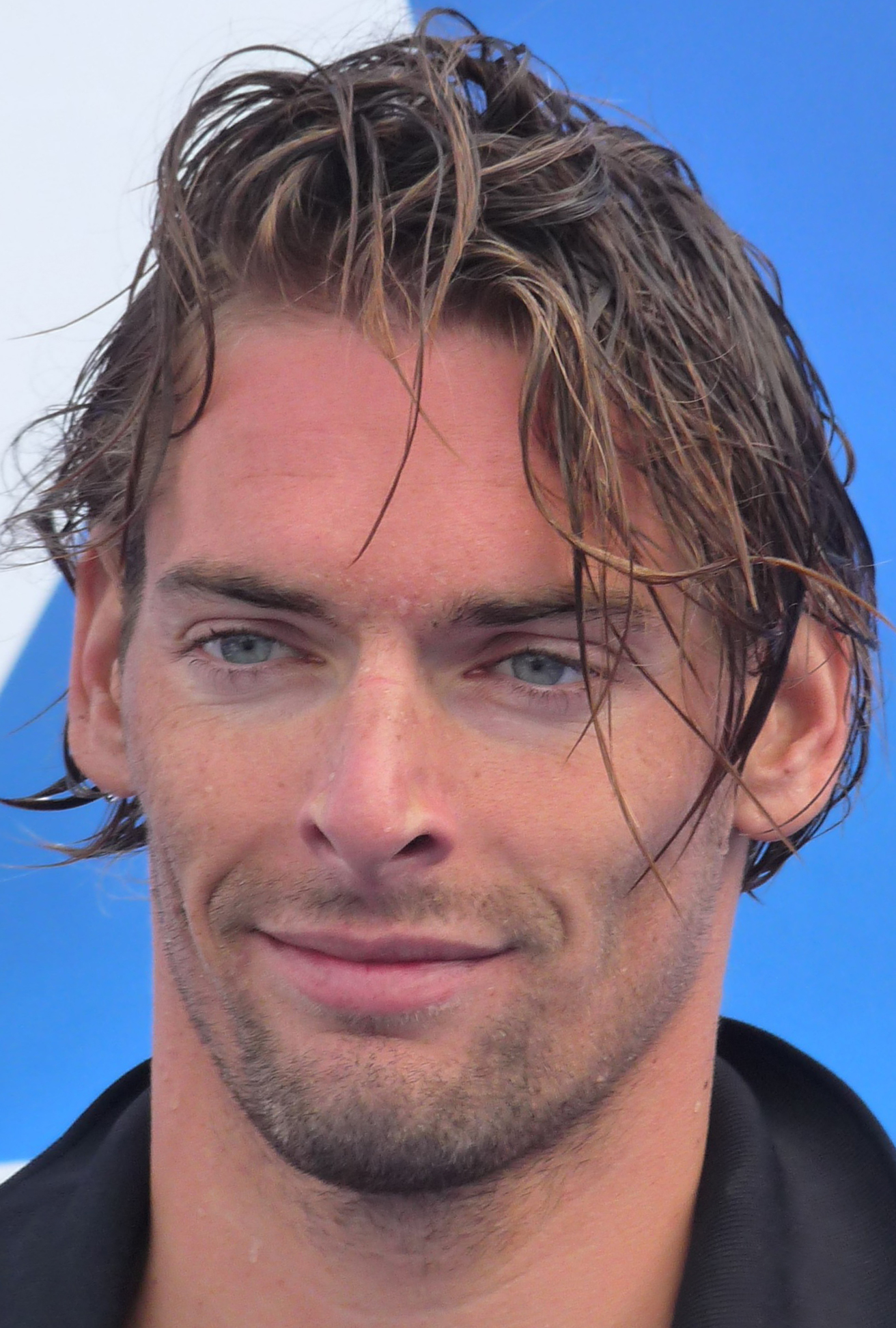
- 2012

Personal information
- National team: France
- Born: 22 April 1985 (age 41) Narbonne, France
- Height: 2.00 m (6 ft 7 in)
- Weight: 85 kg (187 lb)

Sport
- Sport: Swimming
- Strokes: Backstroke
- Club: CN Marseille
Medal record
Men's sport
Representing France
World Championships (LC)
Gold medal – first place	2011 Shanghai	100 m backstroke
Gold medal – first place	2013 Barcelona	50 m backstroke
Gold medal – first place	2013 Barcelona	4×100 m medley
Gold medal – first place	2015 Kazan	50 m backstroke
Gold medal – first place	2017 Budapest	50 m backstroke
Silver medal – second place	2011 Shanghai	50 m backstroke
Silver medal – second place	2015 Kazan	100 m backstroke
Bronze medal – third place	2015 Kazan	4×100 m medley
World Championships (SC)
Silver medal – second place	2010 Dubai	100 m backstroke
European Championships (LC)
Gold medal – first place	2010 Budapest	50 m backstroke
Gold medal – first place	2010 Budapest	100 m backstroke
Gold medal – first place	2010 Budapest	4×100 m medley
Gold medal – first place	2016 London	50 m backstroke
Gold medal – first place	2016 London	100 m backstroke
European Championships (SC)
Silver medal – second place	2013 Herning	100 m backstroke

Camille Lacourt (French pronunciation: [kamij lakuʁ]; born 22 April 1985) is a retired French competitive swimmer and backstroke specialist. He won the 50 metre backstroke at three consecutive world championships (2013 Barcelona, 2015 Kazan, and 2017 Budapest). He competed at the 2012 Olympics in the 100 metre backstroke and finished fourth. In the 2016 Rio Olympics, he finished fifth in the same event.

== Swimming career ==
=== 2010: breakthrough year ===
Lacourt collected three gold medal at the European Championships. He became European Champion in the 100 m backstroke (long course) ahead of compatriot Jérémy Stravius in a time of 52.11. This time was a new European record and the second fastest time ever, second to Aaron Peirsol's 51.94 from 2009. He collected the 50 m backstroke title in a time of 24.07, also bumping him up to the second fastest performer of all time in that event. On the final night, he collected gold in the 4 × 100 m medley relay.

=== Following years ===
Lacourt collected a series of medals at the World Championships in the following years: one gold and one silver in 2011 in Shanghai, two gold in 2013 in Barcelona, and one of each medal in 2015 in Kazan. He finished 4th in the 100 metre backstroke at the 2012 Summer Olympics and failed to win any medals. After missing the 2014 European Championships due to a hip injury, he won two golds at the 2016 European Championships.

Lacourt failed to win any medals at the 2016 Summer Olympics. Following his 5th-place finish in the 100 meter backstroke, Lacourt made international news after criticizing the sport of swimming and making disparaging remarks about Chinese swimmer Sun Yang. In a post-race interview with French radio station RMCsport, Lacourt said: "I am very sad when I see my sport getting like this. I have the impression I am looking at athletics, with two or three doped in each final. I hope that FINA is going to react and stop this massacre, because it is getting sad," and finished with "Sun Yang, he pisses purple!" After being defeated by another Chinese swimmer, Xu Jiayu, who won the silver medal in the 100 meter backstroke, Lacourt said, "I don't like being beaten by a Chinese."

Lacourt won his third consecutive gold medal in the 50 m backstroke at the 2017 World Championships. He then announced his retirement later in 2017.

== Personal life ==
Lacourt was married to Valérie Bègue, who won Miss France 2008. He is the father of a girl, Jazz, born in October 2012. Lacourt and Bègue divorced in 2016.

Since April 2019, he has been in a relationship with Alice Detollenaere. She was a contestant at Miss France 2011. The have a son, born on June 1, 2021.

Camille Lacourt declared he experienced two episodes of depression: the first after the London Olympic Games, following his fourth-place finish in the 100-meter backstroke, and the second when he retired from professional sport in 2017. During that time, he also struggled with alcoholism.

== Personal bests (long course) ==
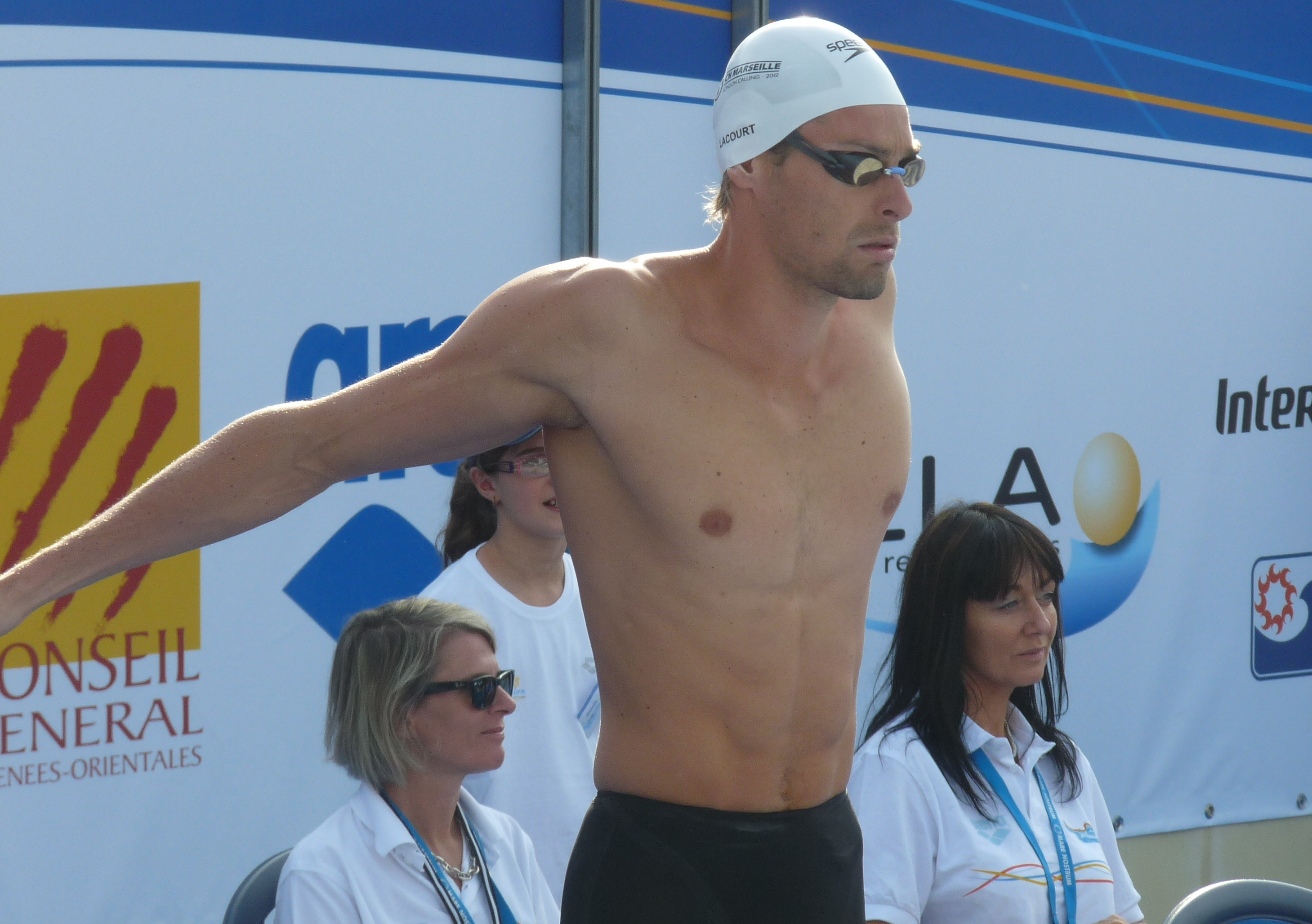
Lacourt in 2012

Event	Time	Date
50 m backstroke	24.07 NR	12 August 2010
100 m backstroke	52.11 ER	10 August 2010
200 m backstroke	2:00.57	7 April 2010

== See also ==
- List of French records in swimming

Awards
Preceded by Paul Biedermann	European Swimmer of the Year; 2010	Succeeded by Alexander Dale Oen
