= Conor Ferguson =

Irish swimmer

Personal information
- Nationality: Irish
- Born: 11 October 1999 (age 26) Belfast, Northern Ireland

Sport
- Sport: Swimming
- Strokes: Backstroke
- Club: Larne Swim Team
- College team: Loughborough University
Medal record
Mens swimming
Representing Ireland
European Youth Olympic Festival
Silver medal – second place	2015 Tbilisi	100 m backstroke
Silver medal – second place	2015 Tbilisi	200 m backstroke

Conor Ferguson (born 11 October 1999) is an Irish swimmer. He competed at the 2024 Olympics for Ireland in the 4x100m Medley Relay alongside Shane Ryan, Max McCusker & Darragh Greene finishing 11th with a National Record.

== Career ==
When Ferguson was 15, he won two silvers in the 2015 European Youth Summer Olympic Festival in the 100 & 200 backstroke

The following year Ferguson competed in the 2016 European Championships, finishing 13th in the 100m backstroke. That year Ferguson came up .05 seconds short of qualifying for the 2016 Summer Olympics.

Ferguson made his World Championships debut at the 2017 World Aquatics Championships, where he competed in the 200m backstroke and finished in 21st place.

In Ferguson's second European Championships in 2018, he just missed out on the final in the 50m backstroke, ultimately finishing 9th. Ferguson also just missed out on the final and also came in 9th in the 100m backstroke, alongside Shane Ryan, Darragh Greene & Brendan Hyland. Ferguson competed in the 4x100m medley relay but was subsequently disqualified.

Ferguson competed for Northern Ireland at the 2018 Commonwealth Games and got to two finals, finishing 5th in the 50m backstroke and 8th in the 100m backstroke. In the 200m backstroke, he finished 9th, narrowly missing out on the final, while he finished 6th in the 4x100m medley relay.

At the 2019 World Championships, Ferguson finished 28th in the 50m backstroke and 33rd in the 200m backstroke, Ferguson also was a member of the Irish mixed 4x100m medley relay team which finished in 19th place.

Conor got to his first European final in 2021, finishing 7th in the 50m backstroke at the 2020 European Championships.

At the 2023 World Championships, Ferguson got his best finish of his career after ending in 13th place in the 50m backstroke and a 22nd place finish in the 100m backstroke. In the 4x100m medley relay, his team finished in 13th place.

In February 2024 at the 2024 World Championships, Ferguson finished 13th in the 100m backstroke and got to his first ever world final in the 4x100m medley relay alongside Shane Ryan, Max McCusker and Darragh Greene, ultimately finishing in 7th place. This performance allowed Ferguson and his teammates to qualify for the 2024 Olympics in Paris in the 4x100m medley relay. They finished three spots outside of a finals place in 11th place, in the process setting a new national record at a time of 3.33.81.
