= Anton Lončar =

Croatian swimmer (born 1996)

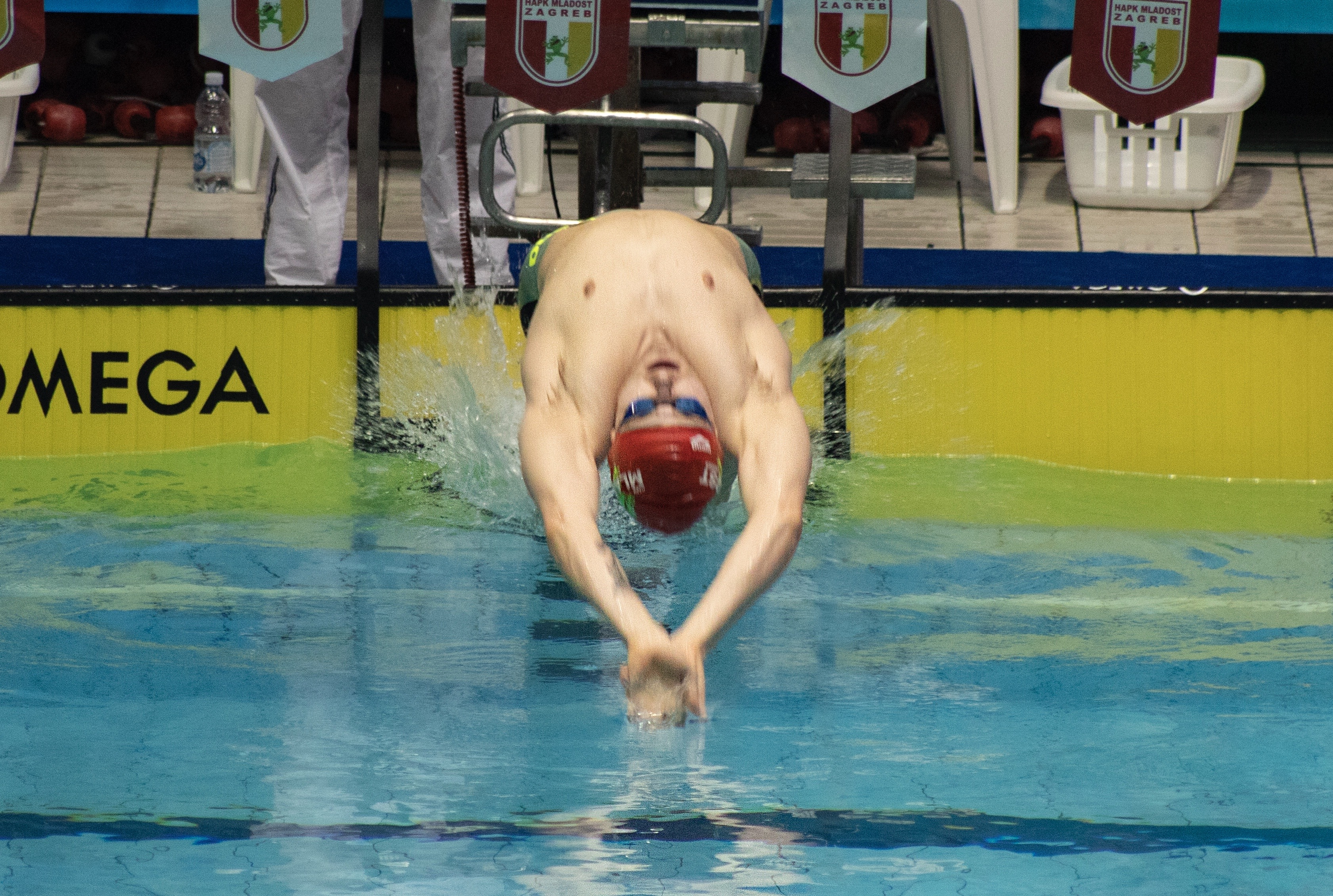

Personal information
- Full name: Anton Louie Lončar
- Nationality: Croatian & American
- Born: 15 January 1996 (age 30) Portland, Oregon, U.S.
- Height: 1.92 m (6 ft 4 in)
- Weight: 187 lb (85 kg)

Sport
- Sport: Swimming
- Strokes: Backstroke
- College team: University of Denver

Anton Lončar (born 15 January 1996) is a Croatian swimmer. He is a five time All-American and school record holder at the University of Denver, and holds the Croatian national record in the 100 (SCM) backstroke.

In 2019 he competed in the men's 100 metre backstroke and men's 200 metre backstroke events at the 2019 World Aquatics Championships, Held in Gwangju, South Korea. He placed 35th in the 100m and 23rd in the 200m.

He also competed in the men's 100 metre backstroke and men's 200 metre backstroke events at the 2018 FINA World Swimming Championships (25 m), in Hangzhou, China. Lončar placed 16th in the 100m, setting the national record of 51.09 s in the process, and placed 13th in the 200m in a time of 1:51.79.

Lončar also competed in the 2017 World Aquatics Championships in Budapest, Hungary, and in the 2016 FINA World Swimming Championships (25 m) in Windsor, Ontario, in the 100m and 200m backstroke events. In the 2017 European Short Course Swimming Championships Lončar placed 5th in the final of the 200m backstroke.
