= Tomasz Polewka =

Polish swimmer

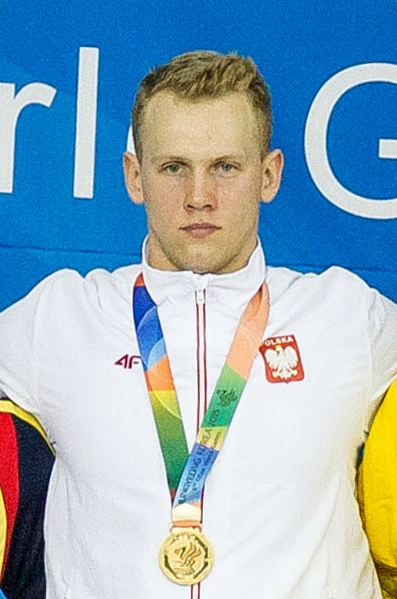
- Polewka at the 2015 Military World Games

Personal information
- Born: 5 August 1994 (age 31) Grudziądz, Poland
- Height: 2.00 m (6 ft 7 in)
- Weight: 96 kg (212 lb)

Sport
- Sport: Swimming
- Strokes: Backstroke
Medal record
Representing Poland
European championships (SC)
Gold medal – first place	2015 Netanya	50 m backstroke
Military World Games
Gold medal – first place	2015 Mungyeong	50 m backstroke
Gold medal – first place	2015 Mungyeong	100 m backstroke
Bronze medal – third place	2015 Mungyeong	4×100 m mixed medley

Tomasz Polewka (born 5 August 1994) is a Polish backstroke swimmer who won the 50 m event at the 2015 European Short Course Championships. He competed in the 100 m backstroke at the 2016 Summer Olympics.
