= Simone Sabbioni =

Italian swimmer (born 1996)

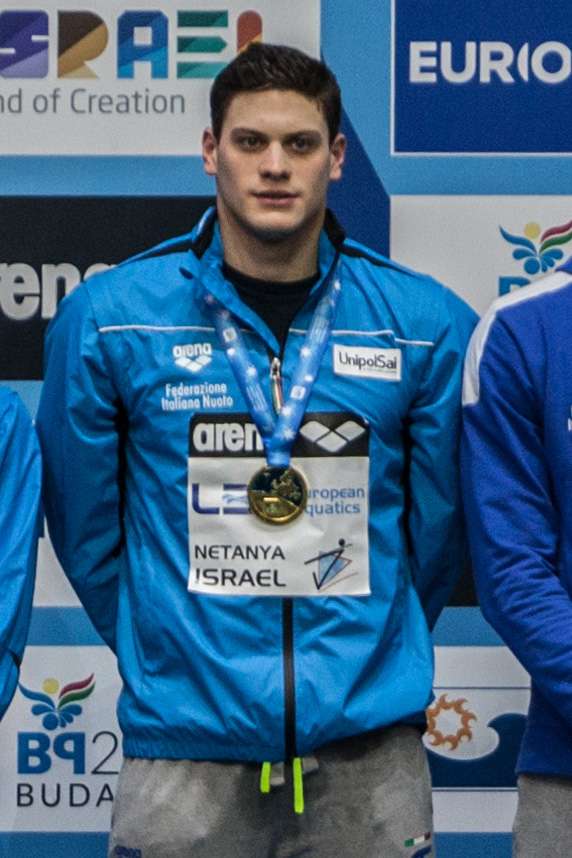

Personal information
- Full name: Simone Sabbioni
- Nickname: Sabster
- Nationality: Italian
- Born: 3 October 1996 (age 29) Rimini, Italy
- Height: 1.85 m (6 ft 1 in)
- Weight: 79 kg (174 lb)

Sport
- Sport: Swimming
- Strokes: Backstroke
Medal record
World Championships (SC)
Bronze medal – third place	2014 Doha	4×50 m mixed medley
European Championships (LC)
Silver medal – second place	2016 London	4 x 100 m mixed medley
Bronze medal – third place	2020 Budapest	4×100 m mixed medley
Bronze medal – third place	2016 London	100 m backstroke
European Championships (SC)
Gold medal – first place	2015 Netanya	4×50 m medley
Gold medal – first place	2015 Netanya	4×50 m mixed medley
Gold medal – first place	2017 Copenhagen	50 m backstroke
Silver medal – second place	2015 Netanya	50 m backstroke
Silver medal – second place	2017 Copenhagen	100 m backstroke
Silver medal – second place	2017 Copenhagen	4×50 m medley
Bronze medal – third place	2015 Netanya	200 m backstroke
European Junior Championships
Gold medal – first place	2014 Dordrecht	50 m backstroke
Bronze medal – third place	2013 Poznań	100 m backstroke
Youth Olympic Games
Gold medal – first place	2014 Nanjing	100 m backstroke

Simone Sabbioni (born 3 October 1996) is an Italian competitive swimmer and two-time Olympian who competed at the 2016 Olympics and the 2020 Olympics. He is a former Italian record holder in the short course 50 metre backstroke, 100 metre backstroke, 200 metre backstroke, 4×50 metre medley relay and the long course 100 metre backstroke.

== International career ==
=== 2014–2015 ===
At the 2014 Summer Youth Olympics, in Nanjing, China in August 2014, Sabbioni won a gold medal in the 100 metre backstroke along with Evgeny Rylov of Russia as they both swam the exact same time of 54.24 seconds in the final. On 14 April 2015, at the year's Italian Spring National Championships in Riccione, he broke the national record in the long course 100 metre backstroke with his time of 53.49, which lowered the record over two tenths of a seconds from the prior record of 53.77 seconds set in 2009 by Mirco Di Tora.

==== 2015 European Short Course Championships ====
In early December, at the 2015 European Short Course Swimming Championships in Netanya, Israel, Sabbioni set Italian national records in all three distances of the short course backstroke events, including two records in the 50 metre backstroke of 23.23 seconds in the semifinals and 23.09 seconds in the final, a record of 50.57 seconds in the 100 metre backstroke, and a record of 1:50.75 in the 200 metre backstroke. He also helped set an Italian record at 1:31.71 in the 4×50 metre medley relay. Later in the month, at the 2015 Italian Winter National Championships, he swam a 53.37 in the 100 metre backstroke, setting a new Italian national record in the event.

=== 2016–2017 ===
In April 2016, at the Italian Spring National Championships for the year in Riccione, Sabbioni broke his former national record of 53.37 seconds in the 100 metre backstroke with his new time of 53.34 seconds. The following month, he won a bronze medal at the 2016 European Aquatics Championships in London, England, in the 100 metre backstroke with a time of 54.19 seconds.

==== 2017 Winter National Championships ====
At the short course 2017 Italian Winter National Championships in early December, Sabbioni lowered his Italian records in the 100 metre backstroke, from a 50.57 to a 49.96, and the 50 metre backstroke, from a 23.09 to a 23.06.

==== 2017 European Short Course Championships ====
2017 European Championships (SC)
Gold medal – first place	50 m backstroke	23.05 (NR)
Silver medal – second place	100 m backstroke	49.68 (NR)
Silver medal – second place	4x50 m medley relay	1:31.91

Later in December, at the 2017 European Short Course Swimming Championships in Copenhagen, Denmark, Sabbioni broke his own national record in the 100 metre backstroke again, lowering the mark to 49.68 seconds and winning the silver medal in the event. For the 50 metre backstroke, Sabbioni lowered his national record of 23.06 from earlier in the month by one hundredth of a second to 23.05 in the final, winning the gold medal in the event and finishing two hundredths of a second ahead of Kliment Kolesnikov of Russia who won the silver medal. Speaking to LEN about the race, Sabbioni said, "Before the race I got really angry. This is the feeling you need to win the 50m. It gives you the power, the strength, the speed. I felt my legs after the turns but anger took over again and it lifted my spirit enough to win this race." In addition to his gold medal and silver medal in individual events, Sabbioni also won a silver medal in the 4×50 meter medley relay, helping the relay finish in a total time of 1:31.91 with his split time of 23.14 seconds for the backstroke leg of the relay.

=== 2018–2019 ===
==== 2018 World Short Course Championships ====
At the 2018 World Short Course Championships held in Hangzhou, China in December, Sabbioni competed on the finals relay of the 4×50 metre medley relay, helping the relay achieve a time of 1:31.54, set a new Italian record in the event, and place fourth overall.

==== 2019 World Championships ====
At the 2019 World Aquatics Championships in Gwangju, South Korea in July 2019, Sabbioni competed in the 50 metre backstroke, 100 metre backstroke, mixed 4×100 metre medley relay, and 4×100 metre medley relay. Sabbioni was one of two swimmers, the other being Dylan Carter of Trinidad and Tobago, to have wedge equipment malfunction during his backstroke start in the 100 metre backstroke, and the only swimmer to have the technology fail a second time after officials assured him nothing would happen, this story was picked up and covered by newspapers The Seattle Times and The Korea Herald. As officials ruled it was equipment failure on the wedge malfunction each time, Sabbioni was allowed to re-race the event until the equipment worked, at which point he swam a 53.85 for his time in the prelims heats and advanced to the semifinals. In the semifinals, Sabbioni finished with a time of 53.71 seconds, tied for 12th overall with Daniel Martin of Romania, and did not advance to the final of the event.

=== 2021 ===
==== 2020 Summer Olympics ====
At the 2020 Summer Olympics in Tokyo, Japan in 2021, Sabbioni ranked 17th in the 100 metre backstroke with a time of 53.79 and competed in the first ever swimming of the 4×100 metre mixed medley relay event at the Olympic Games, which was the preliminaries of the event on 29 July, where he swam the backstroke leg of the relay and helped qualify for the final ranking fifth overall, where the finals relay went on to place fourth.

==== 2021 European Short Course Championships ====
Sabbioni was one of a total of 40 swimmers named to the Italian team in October 2021 to compete at the 2021 European Short Course Swimming Championships held in November at the Kazan Aquatics Palace located in Kazan, Russia. He went for depth with his events for the Championships, entering to compete in all available distances in backstroke, the 50 metre backstroke, 100 metre backstroke, and 200 metre backstroke. On the first day of competition, 2 November, he placed third in his prelims heat of the 50 metre backstroke with a time of 23.50 seconds and did not advance to the semifinals. While his time was faster than some of the swimmers who qualified for the semifinals, including Kristóf Milák of Hungary in the same prelims heat, only the fastest two Italian swimmers advanced, which did not include Sabbioni. The same day he was officially withdrawn from the 200 metre backstroke, opting not to race the event. In the prelims heats of the 100-metre backstroke on the third day of competition, Sabbioni swam a 51.98 and did not advance to the semifinals.

=== 2022–2023 ===
In November 2022, Sabbioni was banned by FINA, now World Aquatics, from their competitions for 20 months (starting 23 March 2022 and continuing through the end of the day on 22 November 2023) after representatives from the World Anti-Doping Agency had difficulty ascertaining his whereabouts for testing on three occasions, a case similar to Rūta Meilutytė of Lithuania from 2019.

== International championships (50 m) ==
Meet	50 backstroke	100 backstroke	200 backstroke	4×100 freestyle	4×100 medley	4×100 mixed medley
Junior level
EJC 2013	5th	3rd place, bronze medalist(s)	12th			
WJC 2013	5th	9th	12th			
EJC 2014	1st place, gold medalist(s)	2nd place, silver medalist(s)			2nd place, silver medalist(s)	3rd place, bronze medalist(s)
YOG 2014	3rd place, bronze medalist(s)	1st place, gold medalist(s)	6th	2nd place, silver medalist(s)		
Senior level
WC 2015	12th	10th			9th	6th
EC 2016	13th	3rd place, bronze medalist(s)			DSQ	2nd place, silver medalist(s)
OG 2016	—N/a	28th			11th	—N/a
MG 2018	1st place, gold medalist(s)	2nd place, silver medalist(s)			DSQ	—N/a
EC 2018	9th	5th				
WC 2019	14th	12th			13th	6th
EC 2020	7th	15th				(silver) ^{[a]}
OG 2020	—N/a	17th				4th^{[a]}

^{a} Sabbioni swam only in the preliminaries.

== International championships (25 m) ==
Meet	50 backstroke	100 backstroke	200 backstroke	4×50 medley	4×100 medley	4×50 mixed medley
WC 2014	20th	18th	20th			(bronze) ^{[a]}
EC 2015	2nd place, silver medalist(s)	5th	3rd place, bronze medalist(s)	1st place, gold medalist(s)	—N/a	1st place, gold medalist(s)
EC 2017	1st place, gold medalist(s)	2nd place, silver medalist(s)	18th	2nd place, silver medalist(s)	—N/a	8th
WC 2018	6th	9th		4th	9th	5th
EC 2019	11th	4th		4th	—N/a	
EC 2021	7th (h)	19th			—N/a	

^{a} Sabbioni swam only in the preliminaries.

== Personal best times ==
=== Short course metres (25 m pool) ===
Event	Time	Meet	Location	Date	Notes
50 m backstroke	23.05	2017 European Short Course Championships	Copenhagen, Denmark	17 December 2017	Former NR
100 m backstroke	49.68	2017 European Short Course Championships	Copenhagen, Denmark	15 December 2017	NR
200 m backstroke	1:50.75	2015 European Short Course Championships	Netanya, Israel	2 December 2015	Former NR

Legend: NR – Italian record

== National records ==
=== Long course metres (50 m pool) ===
No.	Event	Time	Meet	Location	Date	Age	Status	Ref
1	100 m backstroke	53.49	2015 Italian Spring National Championships	Riccione, Emilia-Romagna	14 April 2015	18	Former	
2	100 m backstroke (2)	53.37	2015 Italian Winter National Championships	Italy	18 December 2015	19	Former	
3	100 m backstroke (3)	53.34	2016 Italian Spring National Championships	Riccione, Emilia-Romagna	19 April 2016	19	Former	

=== Short course metres (25 m pool) ===
No.	Event	Time		Meet	Location	Date	Age	Status	Ref
1	200 m backstroke	1:50.75		2015 European Short Course Championships	Netanya, Israel	2 December 2015	19	Former	
2	100 m backstroke	50.57		2015 European Short Course Championships	Netanya, Israel	4 December 2015	19	Former	
3	50 m backstroke	23.23	sf	2015 European Short Course Championships	Netanya, Israel	6 December 2015	19	Former	
4	50 m backstroke (2)	23.09		2015 European Short Course Championships	Netanya, Israel	6 December 2015	19	Former	
5	4x50 m medley relay	1:31.71		2015 European Short Course Championships	Netanya, Israel	6 December 2015	19	Former	
6	100 m backstroke (2)	49.96	h	2017 National Championships	Riccione, Emilia-Romagna	1 December 2017	21	Former	
7	50 m backstroke (3)	23.06		2017 National Championships	Riccione, Emilia-Romagna	1 December 2017	21	Former	
8	100 m backstroke (3)	49.68		2017 European Short Course Championships	Copenhagen, Denmark	15 December 2017	23	Former	
9	50 m backstroke (4)	23.05		2017 European Short Course Championships	Copenhagen, Denmark	17 December 2017	23	Former	
10	4x50 m medley relay (2)	1:31.54		2018 World Short Course Championships	Hangzhou, China	15 December 2018	24	Former	
