= Michael Laitarovsky =

Israeli swimmer (born 1999)

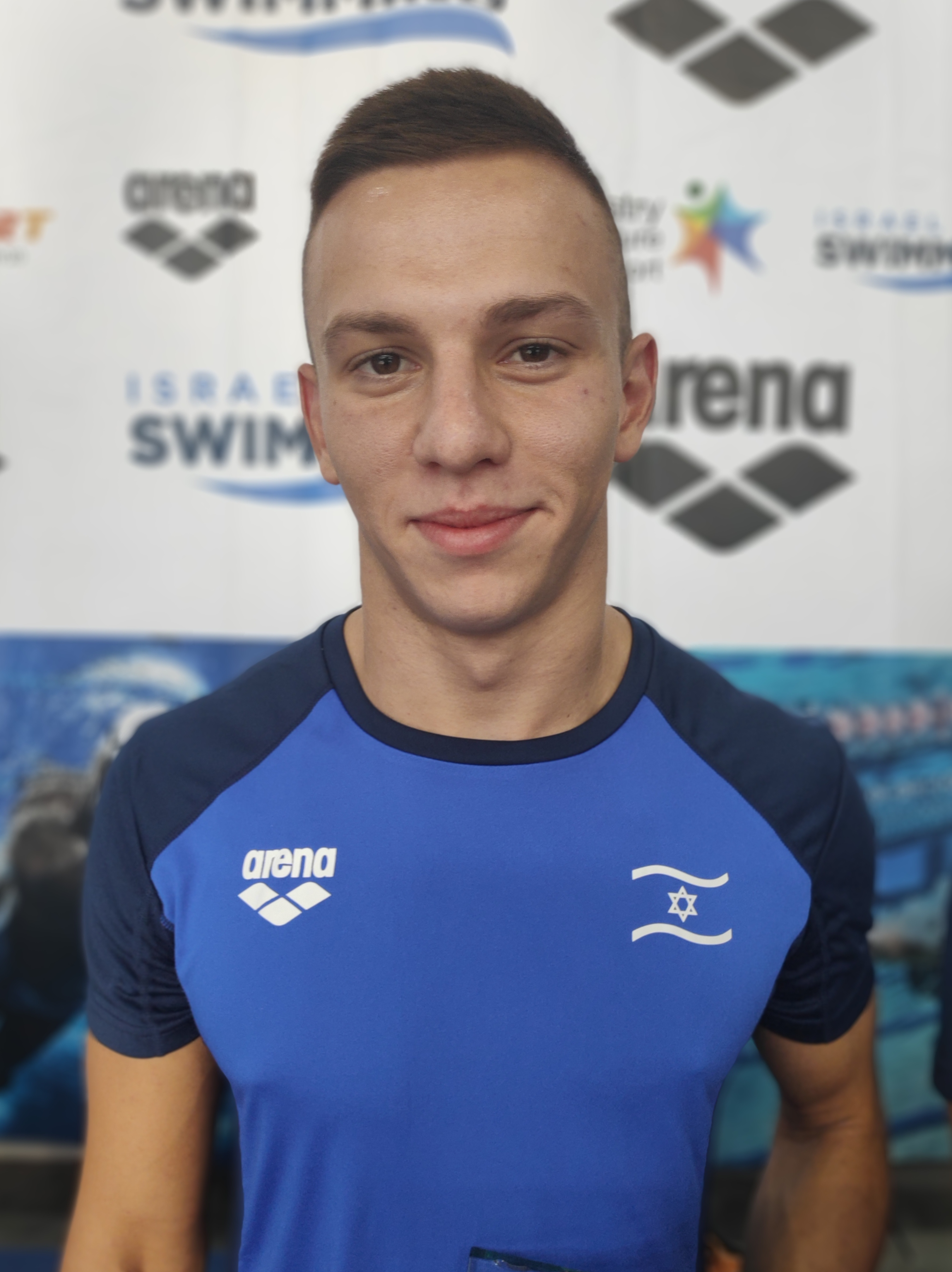
- Laitarovsky in 2019

Personal information
- Native name: מיכאל לייטרובסקי
- Nationality: Israeli
- Born: 15 August 1999 (age 25)

Sport
- Sport: Swimming

Michael Laitarovsky (Hebrew: מיכאל לייטרובסקי; born 15 August 1999) is an Israeli swimmer. He competed in the men's 100 metre backstroke at the 2020 Summer Olympics.
