= Gytis Stankevičius =

Lithuanian swimmer (born 1994)

Personal information
- Born: 30 July 1994 (age 31)

Sport
- Sport: Swimming

Gytis Stankevičius (born 30 July 1994) is a Lithuanian swimmer. He competed in the men's 50 metre backstroke event at the 2017 World Aquatics Championships.
