= Shane Ryan (swimmer) =

Irish swimmer

Personal information
- National team: Ireland
- Born: January 27, 1994 (age 32) Drexel Hill, Pennsylvania, U.S.
- Height: 1.99 m (6 ft 6 in)
- Weight: 93 kg (205 lb)

Sport
- Sport: Swimming
- Strokes: Freestyle, backstroke
- Club: Toronto Titans (ISL 2020); National Aquatic Centre
- College team: Penn State
Medal record
Men's swimming
Representing Ireland
World Championships (SC)
Bronze medal – third place	2018 Hangzhou	50 m backstroke
Bronze medal – third place	2024 Budapest	50 m backstroke
European Championships (LC)
Bronze medal – third place	2018 Glasgow	50 m backstroke
European Championships (SC)
Bronze medal – third place	2019 Glasgow	50 m backstroke
Summer Universiade
Gold medal – first place	2017 Taipei	50 m backstroke

Shane Patrick Ryan (born 27 January 1994) is an American-born retired swimmer who competed internationally for Ireland.

== Career ==
Ryan was a 16-time All-American and 11-time All-State honoree as a swimmer for Haverford Senior High School. He was a member of the US National Junior Team in 2010–11 and 2011–12.

Ryan initially competed at the US Olympics trials in 2012, finishing in 28th, which did not qualify him for the US team. He subsequently switched his allegiance to Ireland. Ryan qualified to compete in the 2016 Summer Olympics by swimming under the Olympic Qualifying time in the 100m backstroke at the Swim Ulster Dave McCullagh Meet in March 2016.

=== College ===
Ryan competed collegiately for Penn State where he set school records in the 50 meter freestyle, 100 meter freestyle and 100 meter backstroke. He won Big Ten Conference championships in the 100 meter backstroke in 2014 and 2015 and the 100 meter freestyle in 2014.

=== International Swimming League ===
In spring 2020, Ryan signed to the Toronto Titans, for their inaugural season; the first Canadian-based professional swim team.

=== World Championships ===
In December 2018, Ryan won the bronze medal in the 50m backstroke at the 2018 World Short Course Swimming Championships.

At the 2016 Olympics, he made it out of the heats of the 100m backstroke to qualify for the semi-finals with a personal-best time of 53.85. He finished in last place in the semifinal.

=== Other ===
In September 2017 at the 2017 University Games, Ryan won the gold medal in the 50m backstroke.

In August 2018 at the 2018 European Championships, Ryan took bronze in the 50 m backstroke.

Ryan participated in the 2026 Enhanced Games.

Olympic Results
Year	50m Free	100m Free	100m Back	100m Fly	4 × 200 m Free Relay	4 × 100 m Medley Relay
2016	43rd	40th	16th	—	—	—
2020	—	—	—	37	14	—
2024	—	—	—	—	—	11th

World Championship Results
Year	50m Free	100m Free	50m Back	50m Fly	100m Back	4 × 100 m Free Relay	4x50m Medley Relay	4 × 100 m Medley Relay
2017	40th	—	23rd	—	12th	—	—	16th
2018 (25m)	—	=12th	3rd place, bronze medalist(s)	—	—	—	11th	10th
2019	—	—	WD	—	21st	20th	—	14th
2023	—	33rd	—	—	—	—	—	13th
2024	—	24th	—	26	—	—	—	7th
2024 (25m)	16th	10th	3rd place, bronze medalist(s)	—	—	—	—	—

== Personal life ==
Ryan's father, Thomas, emigrated from Portarlington, County Laois, in the 1980s; Ryan has Irish citizenship through him and can therefore swim under the Irish flag. His mother, Mary Beth Bonner, is also of Irish descent and won the Miss Mayo pageant in 1986. Ryan was raised in Havertown, Pennsylvania, and graduated with a degree in sports management at Penn State University.

== See also ==
- List of Pennsylvania State University Olympians
