= Mikita Tsmyh =

Belarusian swimmer (born 1997)

Personal information
- Nationality: Belarusian
- Born: 15 April 1997 (age 29) Mogilev, Belarus
- Height: 1.90 m (6 ft 3 in)
- Weight: 80 kg (176 lb)

Sport
- Sport: Swimming

Mikita Dzmitryevich Tsmyh (Belarusian: Мікіта Дзмітрыевіч Цмыг; born 15 April 1997) is a Belarusian swimmer. He competed in the men's 100 metre backstroke event at the 2016 Summer Olympics held in Rio de Janeiro, Brazil. He also represented Belarus at the 2020 Summer Olympics held in Tokyo, Japan.
