= Thierry Bollin =

Swiss swimmer (born 2000)

Personal information
- Nationality: Swiss
- Born: 11 January 2000 (age 26) Bern, Switzerland

Sport
- Sport: Swimming
Medal record
Men's swimming
Representing Switzerland
European Championships (SC)
Bronze medal – third place	2023 Otopeni	50 m backstroke

Thierry Bollin (born 11 January 2000) is a Swiss backstroke swimmer. He competed in the men's 50 metre backstroke event at the 2018 FINA World Swimming Championships (25 m), in Hangzhou, China.
