= Apostolos Christou =

Greek swimmer (born 1996)

Personal information
- Native name: Απόστολος Χρήστου
- Nationality: Greek
- Born: 1 November 1996 (age 29) Athens, Greece
- Height: 1.98 m (6 ft 6 in)
- Weight: 88 kg (194 lb)

Sport
- Sport: Swimming
- Strokes: Backstroke
- Club: Olympiacos CFP
Medal record
Men's swimming
Representing Greece
Olympic Games
Silver medal – second place	2024 Paris	200 m backstroke
World Championships (LC)
Bronze medal – third place	2024 Doha	100 m backstroke
European Championships (LC)
Gold medal – first place	2026 Paris	100 m backstroke
Gold medal – first place	2024 Belgrade	50 m backstroke
Gold medal – first place	2024 Belgrade	100 m backstroke
Gold medal – first place	2022 Rome	50 m backstroke
Silver medal – second place	2022 Rome	100 m backstroke
Bronze medal – third place	2024 Belgrade	4x100 m freestyle
Bronze medal – third place	2020 Budapest	100 m backstroke
Bronze medal – third place	2018 Glasgow	100 m backstroke
Bronze medal – third place	2016 London	100 m backstroke
European Championships (SC)
Bronze medal – third place	2021 Kazan	100 m backstroke
Youth Olympic Games
Silver medal – second place	2014 Nanjing	50 m backstroke
World Junior Championships
Gold medal – first place	2013 Dubai	100 m backstroke
European Junior Championships
Gold medal – first place	2014 Dordrecht	100 m backstroke
Silver medal – second place	2014 Dordrecht	50 m backstroke
Silver medal – second place	2014 Dordrecht	200 m backstroke
Bronze medal – third place	2013 Poznan	50 m backstroke
Mediterranean Games
Gold medal – first place	2018 Tarragona	4×100 m medley relay
Gold medal – first place	2018 Tarragona	100 m backstroke
Gold medal – first place	2026 Taranto	50 m backstroke
Gold medal – first place	2026 Taranto	100 m backstroke
Silver medal – second place	2018 Tarragona	4×100 m freestyle
Silver medal – second place	2026 Taranto	4×100 m mixed medley
Bronze medal – third place	2018 Tarragona	50 m backstroke
Bronze medal – third place	2018 Tarragona	200 m backstroke

Apostolos Christou (Greek: Απόστολος Χρήστου; born 1 November 1996) is a Greek swimmer specializing in backstroke. He is the Greek National Record holder in the 100 metre freestyle, 50 and 100 metre backstroke events, as well as contributing to national record efforts in 4x100 and 4x50 metre freestyle and medley relays. He is a three-time Olympian, qualifying in 2016, 2021, and most recently 2024, where he became Greece's first Olympic medalist in swimming since the inaugural 1896 Games through his 2nd-place finish in the 200 metre backstroke. Ηe holds a bronze medal in the World Championship as well as 4 gold medals, a sliver medal, and 4 bronze medals in European Championships.

== Career ==
=== 2013 ===
2013 marked then-16-year-old Christou's first major successes at an international stage. At the 2013 European Junior Swimming Championships, Christou placed 3rd in the 50 metre backstroke, his first medal finish at a major competition outside his home country, Greece. Then, at the 2013 World Junior Championships, Christou placed first in 54.87, beating 2nd place Danas Rapsys by 0.37 seconds. He also placed 9th in the 50 metre backstroke semifinal (26.18) and 14th in the semifinal of the 200 metre (2:04.20).

=== 2014 ===
At the European Junior Swimming Championships in July 2014, Christou again competed in all three backstroke distances, placing in the top two of all three events.

On the first night of the meet in the 100 metre backstroke semifinals, Christou set a new world junior record with a time of 54.41. This time was over a second slower than the 53.38 set by then-17-year-old Ryan Murphy at the 2013 US National Championships; however, FINA only started tracking this record in April 2014 and established the records as the winning time from the 2013 World Junior Championships, so the previous record to beat was not Murphy's time but rather Christou's own 54.87. This swim also made Christou the top seed heading into finals, where he again placed first with another world junior record, this time swimming a 54.03 and beating Italian Simon Sabbioni (54.25) and Russian Evgeny Rylov (54.46) for gold.

Later in the meet, Christou won silver in both the 50 metre backstroke (25.33) and the 200 metre backstroke (1:59.77).

In August, Christou competed at the 2014 Youth Olympic Games, where he placed 2nd in the 50 metre backstroke (25.44) and 4th in the 100 metre backstroke (55.06), exactly half a second off the podium. Notably, his 54.03 from the month prior would have won him gold, as Rylov and Sabbioni tied for first with a time of 54.24. Christou also competed in the 200 metre backstroke, where he placed 13th in the semifinals in a time of 2:04.45.

=== 2015 ===
In August 2015, Christou made his senior international debut at the 2015 FINA World Championship, although he failed to advance past the heats in all of his events. He placed 24th in the 50 metre backstroke (25.50) and 31st in the 100 metre backstroke (55.10) in addition to leading off the 4 x 100 metre medley relay in a time of 55.43. He was also entered in the 200 metre backstroke, although he did not swim in the heats.

=== 2016 ===
==== 2016 European Championships and Olympic Qualification ====
In May 2016, Christou again competed in the 50, 100, and 200 metre backstrokes in addition to the 4x100 metre freestyle and medley relays. In finals, he tied for 3rd in the 100 (54.19) and 5th in the 200 (1:58.87). He swam significantly faster in earlier rounds, however; his prelims and semifinals times of 53.77 and 53.36 in the 100, respectively, were both faster than Camille Lacourt's gold medal-winning time of 53.79 in finals, and he swam a 1:57.41 in semifinals of the 200 metre, which would have placed 4th. Still, these earlier swims all marked significant personal bests for Christou, as he won his first senior international medal, bronze. He also placed 10th in the semifinal of the 50 metre backstroke (25.28).

Furthermore, Christou swam not only on the 4 × 100 m medley relay, which he led off in 54.30 en route to a new Greek national record (3:34.41) and 4th-place finish, but also on Greece's 4 × 100 m freestyle relay, which also placed 4th (3:14.42) with Christou on the third leg (48.13). Both relays narrowly missed the podium, being .29 and .12 seconds behind bronze medalists Hungary and Belgium, respectively.

In this meet, Christou secured the Olympic Qualifying Times in both the 100 and 200 metre backstrokes. Furthermore, Greece qualified for both 4 x 100 metre relays: although they did not qualify automatically through the 2015 World Championships, their times from the European Championships were fast enough for the 13th and 16th seeds for the Olympic Games.

==== 2016 Olympic Games ====
During the 2016 Summer Olympics in Rio de Janeiro, Christou competed in the men's 100 and 200 metre backstrokes, failing to qualify for semifinals in both, and swam on the 4x100 freestyle and medley relays for Greece, neither of which advanced to the finals. He placed 18th in the heats of the men's 100 metre backstroke with a time of 54.12 seconds and 24th in the heats of the men's 200 metre backstroke with a time of 1:59.78.

In the men's 4 x 100 metre medley relay, Greece placed 15th in the heats in a time of 3:36.75 after Christou led off with a 54.68 backstroke leg. The Greek men's 4 x 100 metre freestyle relay team, which Christou anchored in 48.14 seconds, placed 10th in the heats with a time of 3:14.62, missing the final by less than half a second.

=== 2017 ===
At the 2017 World Championships, Christou placed 10th in the 50 metre backstroke (24.88) and 13th in the 100 (54.04), missing the finals in both events, after swimming a 53.55 in the preliminaries which would have placed 7th in semifinals. He did not swim the 200 metre backstroke despite being entered. He also swam on both 4 x 100 metre relays.

=== 2018 ===
Christou won a medal at each of his events at the 2018 Mediterranean Games in June: 3 individual medals in each of the backstrokes and 2 relays as part of Greece's 4 x 100 freestyle and medley teams. He won gold in the 100 metre backstroke (54.68) and bronze in the 50 metre (25.35) as well as the 200 (2:00.37). Greece won gold in the 4x100 medley relay (3:36.54) and silver in the freestyle (3:18.25).

Later that year at the 2018 European Championships, Christou won bronze in the 100 metre backstroke (53.72) and placed 5th and 7th in the 200 (1:57.09) and 50 metre (25.14) distances, respectively, with the former being a new personal best and national record. Greece also placed 5th in the 4 x 100 freestyle relay (3:14.52) and 10th in the medley (3:38.10).

=== 2019 ===
At the 2019 World Championships, Christou made his first world championships final, placing 8th in the 50 backstroke and setting his first national record in the event (24.75). He also placed 10th in the semifinal of the 100 (53.56) and 24th in the heats of the 200 (1:59.42). Greece placed 10th in the 4 × 100 m freestyle relay (3:14.44) but, unlike previous years, did not qualify for the medley relay.

=== ISL ===
During the debut International Swimming League (ISL) season in 2019, Christou was a member of the Aqua Centurions team. At that point, Christou had significant short course metres experience, often making semifinals at the short course world championships; however, he struggled to score points in his debut season as the Centurions finished seventh.

During the 2nd and 3rd ISL seasons (2020–2021), Christou was a member of the LA Current. He contributed significantly to points-scoring relays, and during his third season in 2021, he scored significant points individually as well.

=== 2021 ===
At the 2021 European Championships, Christou broke the 53 second barrier in the 100 metre backstroke for the first time, first swimming a 52.77 in semifinals, setting his first national record in the event, before winning bronze with a 52.97. He also placed 4th in the 50 metre backstroke (24.59) and 23rd in the 200 (1:59.79).

Christou also again swam the 4 x 100 metre freestyle relay, this time leading off the relay with national record times in both rounds. In preliminaries, Christou swam a 48.65 100 metre freestyle (split), beating Kristian Gkolomeev's previous mark of 48.68 by .03 seconds. Christou then swam a 48.39 in finals, resetting his record from that morning, which contributed heavily to Greece's 3:13.39 final time in the event, a new national record. The relay finished 5th. In the heats of the 4 x 100 metre medley relay, Christou swam a 53.71 backstroke leg and Greece finished in 14th with a time of 3:37.06.

Christou decided not to swim the 200 metre backstroke at the 2020 Summer Olympics, instead electing to focus on the 100 metre backstroke and freestyle disciplines in addition to swimming in Greece's 4 × 100 m freestyle, medley, and mixed medley relays. Individually, he placed 18th in the 100 freestyle (48.50) and 11th in the 100 backstroke (53.41), and Greece placed 15th in the 4x100 freestyle relay (3:15.29), 14th in the 4x100 medley relay (3:36.28), and 11th in the mixed medley (3:44.77).

The 2021 European Short Course Championships saw Christou place 3rd in the 100 metre backstroke (49.87), 5th in the 50 backstroke (23.04), and 7th in the 100 freestyle (46.91). In the 2021 Short Course World Championships a month later, Christou made both the 50 and 100 metre backstroke finals, where he finished 7th in the 100 (49.91) and 8th in the 50 (23.08). He also swam backstroke on the 4 x 50 metre mixed medley relay at both meets, where they finished 9th (1:40.30) at the European Championships and 7th (1:39.51) at the World Championships after making finals.

=== 2022 ===
In the 100 metre backstroke semifinals of the 2022 World Championships in Budapest, Christou set a new national record and championship record in the event with a time of 52.09, beating Italian Thomas Ceccon by just 0.03 seconds. This championship record was broken the next day, however, as Ceccon won in a new world record time of 51.60 and two other swimmers also broke the 52-second barrier. Christou, who failed to replicate his time from semifinals, still placed 5th in 52.57. Christou also placed 5th in the 50 metre backstroke with a time of 24.57, and these two placements would mark his highest world championships finishes to that point.

Christou set another national record at the 2022 European Aquatics Championships, winning gold in the 50 metre backstroke with a time of 24.36. He also won silver in the 100 metre backstroke (52.24). He led off their 4 x 100 freestyle relay, although the relay was disqualified due to an early take-off for the third swimmer, and he swam in the 4 x 100 medley relay, which placed 7th (3:47.44).

=== 2023 ===
At the 2023 World Aquatics Championships, Christou swam a disappointing 54.01 in the 100 metre backstroke heats, placing 19th and missing the semifinal. A few days later, he placed 6th in the 50 metre backstroke final (24.60), just 0.10 seconds from taking bronze. He swam in both the 4 x 100 medley and freestyle relays which placed 14th (3:47.57) and 15th (3:15.86), respectively.

=== 2024 ===
At the 2024 European Aquatics Championships in June, two months before the Olympics, Christou won gold in both the 50 and 100 metre backstroke distances in times of 24.39 and 52.23, respectively.

==== 2024 Olympic Games ====
Entering the 2024 Paris Olympic Games, Christou was seeded 4th in the 100 metre backstroke and 18th in the 200. He was hoping to secure a medal—Greece's first in swimming since 1896—but after a disappointing 4th-place finish in the 100 with a time of 52.41, just 0.02 off Ryan Murphy in bronze, Christou sought redemption in the 200. Despite the heavy odds against him, as his previous times were all well off those of the medal contenders, Christou quickly established himself during the race, going out in 26.39 in the opening 50 and 55.14 at the 100 metre mark, 0.75 seconds ahead of Hugo Gonzalez and 1.16 ahead of Hubert Kos. He continued pushing the pace into the 150, splitting a 29.22, the third fastest in the field, and maintained a lead of over a second over Kos and the rest of the field going into the final 50 metres. Despite being caught by Kos after closing in 30.46, the slowest in the entire field by a significant margin, Christou was able to hang on for 2nd place, outtouching Switzerland's Roman Mityukov by 0.03 seconds. This was not only one of the most surprising medals of the entire Olympics, as Christou, known to specialize in sprint events like the 50 and 100, swam a massive personal best over 1.5 seconds faster than his seed time to get onto the podium, but also one of the most historic. As a result of this swim, Christou also reclaimed his national record, beating Apostolos Siskos's 1:55.42 from the 2024 European Championships by over half a second.

At the Olympics, Christou also contributed to Greece's 4 x 100 mixed medley relay, which finished 13th (3:46.40) after he led off with a 52.83 backstroke leg.

== Personal best times ==
=== Long course metres (50 m pool) ===
Event	Time		Meet	Location	Date	Age	Notes	Ref
50 m freestyle	22.14		Faros - Elena Sairi 2024	Alexandroupolis, Greece	24 February 2024	27		
100 m freestyle	48.39	r	2020 European Aquatics Championships	Budapest, Hungary	17 May 2021	24	NR	
50 m backstroke	24.36		2022 European Aquatics Championships	Rome, Italy	15 August 2022	25	NR	
100 m backstroke	52.09	sf	2022 World Aquatics Championships	Budapest, Hungary	19 June 2022	25	NR	
200 m backstroke	1:54.82	#	2024 Summer Olympics	Paris, France	1 August 2024	27	NR	
50 m butterfly	24.17		National Open Winter Swimming Championships	Athens, Greece	23 February 2018	21		
100 m butterfly	53.52		Greek National Winter Championships (50m)		25 February 2022	25		
200 m individual medley	2:01.90		53rd International Trophy Sette Colli	Rome, Italy	26 June 2016	19		

Legend: # – Record awaiting ratification by KOE; NR – Greek record;
Records not set in finals: h – heat; sf – semifinal; r – relay 1st leg; rh – relay heat 1st leg; b – B final; † – en route to final mark; so – swim-off; tt – time trial

=== Short course metres (25 m pool) ===
Event	Time		Meet	Location	Date	Age	Notes	Ref
50 m freestyle	21.32		ISL Season 3 Playoff - Match 16	Eindhoven	25 November 2021	25		
100 m freestyle	46.66	sf	2021 European Short Course Championships	Kazan, Russia	6 November 2021	25		
50 m backstroke	22.87	sf	2021 European Short Course Championships	Kazan, Russia	3 November 2022	25		
100 m backstroke	49.66	sf	16th FINA World Swimming Championships (25m)	Melbourne	13 December 2022	26		
200m backstroke	1:50.75		ISL Season 3 Final - Match 18	Eindhoven	3 December 2022	19		
50 m butterfly	23.33		2os Agonas Epidoseon - Athens (25m) - Group D	Athens	5 November 2022	26		
100 m medley	53.99	h	12th FINA World Swimming Championships (25m) 2014	Doha	6 December 2014	18		

== Records ==
=== World Junior Records (LCM) ===
Event	Time		Meet	Location	Date	Status	Ref
100 m backstroke	54.87		2013 FINA World Junior Swimming Championships	Dubai, United Arab Emirates	August 28, 2013	Former	
100 m backstroke	54.41	sf	2014 European Junior Swimming Championships	Dordrecht, The Netherlands	July 9, 2014	Former	
100 m backstroke	54.03		2014 European Junior Swimming Championships	Dordrecht, The Netherlands	July 10, 2014	Former	

Records not set in finals: sf—semifinal

=== Greek National Records (LCM) ===
Event	Time		Meet	Location	Date	Status	Notes	Ref
50 m backstroke	24.75		2019 World Aquatics Championships	Gwangju, South Korea	July 29, 2019	Former		
50 m backstroke	24.49	sf	2020 European Aquatics Championships	Budapest, Hungary	May 17, 2021	Former		
50 m backstroke	24.36		2022 European Aquatics Championships	Rome, Italy	August 15, 2022	Current		
100 m backstroke	52.77		2020 European Aquatics Championships	Budapest, Hungary	May 19, 2021	Former		
100 m backstroke	52.09	sf	2022 World Aquatics Championships	Budapest, Hungary	June 19, 2022	Current	Former CR	
200m backstroke	1:57.09		2018 European Aquatics Championships	Glasgow	August 8, 2018	Former		
200m backstroke	1:56.70		National Open Swimming Championships	Greece	July 19, 2022	Former		
200m backstroke	1:56.34		2024 Greek Swimming National Championships	Thessaloniki, Greece	May 17, 2024	Former		
200m backstroke	1:54.82	#	Olympic Games Paris 2024	Paris, France	August 1, 2024	Current		
100 m freestyle	48.65	rh	2020 European Aquatics Championships	Budapest, Hungary	May 17, 2021	Former		
100 m freestyle	48.39	r	2020 European Aquatics Championships	Budapest, Hungary	May 17, 2021	Current		

Legend: # – Record awaiting ratification by KOE; NR – Greek record;
Records not set in finals: h – heat; sf – semifinal; r – relay 1st leg; rh – relay heat 1st leg; b – B final; † – en route to final mark; so – swim-off; tt – time trial
