= Tomáš Franta =

Czech swimmer

Personal information
- Nationality: Czech
- Born: 18 April 1998 (age 28)

Sport
- Sport: Swimming

Tomáš Franta (born 18 April 1998) is a Czech swimmer. He competed in the men's 50 metre backstroke event at the 2018 FINA World Swimming Championships (25 m), in Hangzhou, China. In 2019, he represented the Czech Republic at the 2019 World Aquatics Championships in Gwangju, South Korea.
