= Israel at the 2025 World Aquatics Championships =

- Flag of Israel
- World Aquatics code: ISR
- National federation: Israel Swimming Association
- Website: isr.org.il (in Hebrew)

in Singapore
- Competitors: 28 (14 men and 14 women) in 3 sports
- Medals: Gold 0 Silver 0 Bronze 0 Total 0

World Aquatics Championships appearances
- 1973; 1975; 1978; 1982; 1986; 1991; 1994; 1998; 2001; 2003; 2005; 2007; 2009; 2011; 2013; 2015; 2017; 2019; 2022; 2023; 2024; 2025

Israel competed at the 2025 World Aquatics Championships in Singapore from 11 July to 3 August.

== Competitors ==
The following is the list of competitors in the Championships.

Sport	Men	Women	Total
Artistic swimming	1	9	10
Open water swimming	2	1	3
Swimming	11	4	15
Total	14	14	28

== Artistic swimming ==
Mixed

Athlete	Event	Preliminaries		Final	
Athlete	Event	Points	Rank	Points	Rank
Yogev Dagan; Aya Mazor	Mixed duet technical	—		186.7492	9
Yogev Dagan; Aya Mazor; Catherine Kunin; Ariel Nassee; Alexandra Lerman; Shaya Sar Shalom Nechmad; Lior Makmel; Yaara Sharabi	Team technical routine	241.8292	11 Q	245.2975	12
Yogev Dagan; Aya Mazor; Catherine Kunin; Alexandra Lerman; Shaya Sar Shalom Nechmad; Lior Makmel; Yaara Sharabi; Noga Levy	Team free routine	230.6845	13	Did not advance	
Yogev Dagan; Aya Mazor; Catherine Kunin; Alexandra Lerman; Shaya Sar Shalom Nechmad; Lior Makmel; Yaara Sharabi; Ella Stiner	Team acrobatic routine	176.9417	13	Did not advance	

== Open water swimming ==
Men

Athlete	Event	Time	Rank
Yonatan Ahdut	Men's 10 km	2:07:47.3	29
Matan Roditi	Men's 10 km	DNF	

Women

Athlete	Event	Time	Rank
Ofek Adir	Women's 10 km	2:20:44.5	32

== Swimming ==
Israel entered 15 swimmers.

Men

Athlete	Event	Heat		Semifinal		Final	
Athlete	Event	Time	Rank	Time	Rank	Time	Rank
Meiron Cheruti	50 metre freestyle	21.64	6 Q	21.77	=8 R (Note: Cheruti lost to Ji Yu-chan in the Semi-final Swim-off with a result of 21.74 seconds and therefore was designated in 9th place as the first replacement.)	Did not advance	
Meiron Cheruti	50 metre butterfly	23.51	29	Did not advance			
Gal Cohen Groumi	100 metre butterfly	51.46	15 Q	51.64	16	Did not advance	
Inbar Danziger	100 metre backstroke	54.59	31	Did not advance			
Inbar Danziger	200 metre backstroke	1:57.82	23	Did not advance			
Alexeyi Glivinskiy	200 metre freestyle	1:47.54	23	Did not advance			
Alexeyi Glivinskiy	200 metre individual medley	1:59.00	15 Q	1:59.41	14	Did not advance	
Martin Kartavi	50 metre freestyle	21.91	=16 R (Note: Kartavi lost to Santo Condorelli in the Heats Swim-off with a result of 21.94 seconds and therefore was designated in 17th place as the first replacement.)	Did not advance			
Daniel Krichevsky	100 metre freestyle	48.88	30	Did not advance			
Jonathan Itzhaki	100 metre breaststroke	1:02.26	42	Did not advance			
Kristian Pitsuhgin	50 metre breaststroke	27.30	22	Did not advance			
Yoav Romano	400 metre freestyle	3:51.01	27	—		Did not advance	
Tomer Shuster	50 metre backstroke	25.34	=33	Did not advance			
Alexeyi Glivinskiy; Denis Loktev; Daniel Krichevsky; Martin Kartavi	4 × 100 m freestyle relay	3:13.39 NR	12	—		Did not advance	
Alexeyi Glivinskiy; Denis Loktev; Daniel Krichevsky; Yoav Romano	4 × 200 m freestyle relay	7:06.29 NR	7 Q	—		7:06.76	8
Inbar Danziger; Jonathan Itzhaki; Gal Cohen Groumi; Daniel Krichevsky	4 × 100 m medley relay	3:34.91 NR	14	—		Did not advance	

Notes

Women

Athlete	Event	Heat		Semifinal		Final	
Athlete	Event	Time	Rank	Time	Rank	Time	Rank
Aviv Barzelay	100 metre backstroke	1:01.70	25	Did not advance			
Aviv Barzelay	200 metre backstroke	2:11.85	22	Did not advance			
Anastasia Gorbenko	50 metre backstroke	27.95	15 Q	27.65	10 R	Did not advance	
Anastasia Gorbenko	200 metre backstroke	DNS		Did not advance			
Anastasia Gorbenko	50 metre breaststroke	30.60	11 Q	30.30 NR	6 Q	30.45	7
Anastasia Gorbenko	100 metre breaststroke	1:07.34	24	Did not advance			
Anastasia Gorbenko	200 metre individual medley	2:11.53	11 Q	2:09.68	4 Q	2:10.26	7
Arielle Hayon	50 metre butterfly	26.46	27	Did not advance			
Arielle Hayon	100 metre butterfly	58.35	17 R	Did not advance			
Lea Polonsky	100 metre freestyle	56.10	35	Did not advance			
Lea Polonsky	200 metre freestyle	1:59.11	=23	Did not advance			
Lea Polonsky	200 metre butterfly	2:11.65	17 R	Did not advance			
Lea Polonsky	200 metre individual medley	2:11.85	14 Q	2:12.29	15	Did not advance	
Aviv Barzelay; Anastasia Gorbenko; Arielle Hayon; Lea Polonsky	4 × 100 m medley relay	4:02.43 NR	14	—		Did not advance	

Mixed

Athlete	Event	Heat		Final	
Athlete	Event	Time	Rank	Time	Rank
Anastasia Gorbenko; Jonathan Itzhaki; Arielle Hayon; Denis Loktev	4 × 100 m medley relay	DSQ		Did not advance	
