= Israel at the 2022 World Aquatics Championships =

- Flag of Israel
- World Aquatics code: ISR
- National federation: Israel Swimming Association
- Website: isr.org.il (in Hebrew)

in Budapest, Hungary
- Competitors: 26 in 3 sports
- Medals: Gold 0 Silver 0 Bronze 0 Total 0

World Aquatics Championships appearances
- 1973; 1975; 1978; 1982; 1986; 1991; 1994; 1998; 2001; 2003; 2005; 2007; 2009; 2011; 2013; 2015; 2017; 2019; 2022; 2023; 2024; 2025

Israel competed at the 2022 World Aquatics Championships in Budapest, Hungary from 18 June to 3 July.

== Artistic swimming ==
Israel entered 10 artistic swimmers.

Women

Athlete	Event	Preliminaries		Final	
Athlete	Event	Points	Rank	Points	Rank
Eden Blecher; Shelly Bobritsky	Duet technical routine	84.0556	10 Q	84.2990	10
Eden Blecher; Shelly Bobritsky	Duet free routine	85.6000	10 Q	85.6000	10
Eden Blecher; Shelly Bobritsky; Maya Dorf; Noy Gazala; Catherine Kunin; Nikol Nahshonov; Ariel Nassee; Polina Prikazchikova; Neta Rubichek (R); Shani Sharaizin (R)	Team technical routine	84.3848	8 Q	84.5315	7
Eden Blecher; Shelly Bobritsky; Maya Dorf; Noy Gazala; Catherine Kunin; Nikol Nahshonov; Ariel Nassee; Polina Prikazchikova; Neta Rubichek (R); Shani Sharaizin (R)	Team free routine	85.0000	10 Q	85.5667	10
Eden Blecher; Shelly Bobritsky; Maya Dorf; Noy Gazala; Catherine Kunin; Nikol Nahshonov; Ariel Nassee; Polina Prikazchikova; Neta Rubichek; Shani Sharaizin	Free routine combination	85.5333	5 Q	85.9667	5

Legend: (R) = Reserve Athlete

== Open water swimming ==
Israel qualified two male and one female open water swimmers.

Men

Athlete	Event	Time	Rank
Matan Roditi	Men's 10 km	DNS	
Ido Gal	Men's 10 km	2:01:38.90	40

Women

Athlete	Event	Time	Rank
Eva Fabian	Women's 5 km	1:00:54.40	17
Eva Fabian	Women's 10 km	2:03:20.20	19

== Swimming ==
Israel entered 14 swimmers.

Men

Athlete	Event	Heat		Semifinal		Final	
Athlete	Event	Time	Rank	Time	Rank	Time	Rank
Meiron Cheruti	50 m freestyle	22.07	14 Q	22.00	13	Did not advance	
Meiron Cheruti	50 m butterfly	23.58	19	Did not advance			
Gal Cohen Groumi	100 m butterfly	51.96	14 Q	51.79 NR	15	Did not advance	
Gal Cohen Groumi	200 m individual medley	1:59.34	11 Q	1:59.67	13	Did not advance	
Tomer Frankel	100 m freestyle	49.34	30	Did not advance			
Tomer Frankel	100 m butterfly	52.12	16 Q	51.83	16	Did not advance	
Itay Goldfaden	50 m breaststroke	27.87	18	Did not advance			
Michael Laitarovsky	50 m backstroke	25.08	12 Q	25.11	15	Did not advance	
Michael Laitarovsky	100 m backstroke	55.25	24	Did not advance			
Denis Loktev	200 m freestyle	1:47.63	18	Did not advance			
Kristian Pitshugin	50 m breaststroke	27.45	10 Q	27.42	11	Did not advance	
Kristian Pitshugin	100 m breaststroke	1:00.70	16 Q	1:00.33	14	Did not advance	
Ron Polonsky	200 m breaststroke	DSQ		Did not advance			
Ron Polonsky	200 m individual medley	1:58.31	5 Q	1:57.99 NR	9	Did not advance	
Ron Polonsky	400 m individual medley	4:24.05	22	—N/a		Did not advance	
Bar Soloveychik	400 m freestyle	3:49.87	16	—N/a		Did not advance	
Bar Soloveychik	800 m freestyle	8:04.14	17	—N/a		Did not advance	
Tomer Frankel; Gal Cohen Groumi; Denis Loktev; Meiron Cheruti	4 × 100 m freestyle relay	3:15.35 NR	9	—N/a		Did not advance	
Denis Loktev; Bar Soloveychik; Daniel Namir; Gal Cohen Groumi	4 × 200 m freestyle relay	7:12.70	10	—N/a		Did not advance	
	4 × 100 m medley relay	DNS		—N/a		Did not advance	

Women

Athlete	Event	Heat		Semifinal		Final	
Athlete	Event	Time	Rank	Time	Rank	Time	Rank
Aviv Barzelay	100 m backstroke	1:01.65	22	Did not advance			
Aviv Barzelay	200 m backstroke	2:11.62	11 Q	2:10.42 NR	9	Did not advance	
Daria Golovaty	50 m freestyle	25.97	24	Did not advance			
Daria Golovaty	100 m freestyle	55.85	24	Did not advance			
Daria Golovaty	200 m freestyle	2:01.01	23	Did not advance			
Anastasia Gorbenko	200 m backstroke	DNS		Did not advance			
Anastasia Gorbenko	50 m breaststroke	30.82	13 Q	30.54	9	Did not advance	
Anastasia Gorbenko	100 m breaststroke	1:07.88	18	Did not advance			
Anastasia Gorbenko	200 m breaststroke	2:28.58	20	Did not advance			
Anastasia Gorbenko	200 m individual medley	2:10.23	3 Q	2:10.54	6 Q	2:11.02	5
Anastasia Gorbenko	400 m individual medley	DNS		—N/a		Did not advance	
Lea Polonsky	200 m butterfly	2:11.40	15 Q	2:11.31	15	Did not advance	
Lea Polonsky	200 m individual medley	2:13.26	17	Did not advance			
Anastasia Gorbenko; Daria Golovaty; Aviv Barzelay; Lea Polonsky	4 × 100 m freestyle relay	3:43.59	10	—N/a		Did not advance	
Anastasia Gorbenko; Daria Golovaty; Aviv Barzelay; Lea Polonsky	4 × 200 m freestyle relay	8:08.20	11	—N/a		Did not advance	
Anastasia Gorbenko; Daria Golovaty; Aviv Barzelay; Lea Polonsky	4 × 100 m medley relay	4:03.28 NR	9	—N/a		Did not advance	

Mixed

Athlete	Event	Heat		Final	
Athlete	Event	Time	Rank	Time	Rank
Tomer Frankel; Ron Polonsky; Lea Polonsky; Daria Golovaty	4 × 100 m freestyle relay	3:30.24	12	Did not advance	
Anastasia Gorbenko; Kristian Pitshugin; Tomer Frankel; Daria Golovaty	4 × 100 m medley relay	3:48.39	10	Did not advance	
