= Israel at the 2017 World Aquatics Championships =

- Flag of Israel
- World Aquatics code: ISR
- National federation: Israel Swimming Association
- Website: www.isr.org.il

in Budapest, Hungary
- Competitors: 32 in 3 sports
- Medals: Gold 0 Silver 0 Bronze 0 Total 0

World Aquatics Championships appearances
- 1973; 1975; 1978; 1982; 1986; 1991; 1994; 1998; 2001; 2003; 2005; 2007; 2009; 2011; 2013; 2015; 2017; 2019; 2022; 2023; 2024; 2025

Israel is scheduled to compete at the 2017 World Aquatics Championships in Budapest, Hungary from 14 July to 30 July.

== Open water swimming ==
Israel has entered seven open water swimmers

Athlete	Event	Time	Rank
Idan Mordel	Men's 5 km	55:42.2	38
Shahar Resman	Men's 10 km	1:52:32.6	16
Shahar Resman	Men's 25 km	5:11:35.1	16
Matan Roditi	Men's 5 km	55:17.8	30
Yuval Safra	Men's 25 km	5:12:26.5	17
Shai Toledano	Men's 10 km	1:58:23.3	48
Eden Girloanta	Women's 5 km	1:02:06.1	37
Chaya Zabludoff	Women's 5 km	1:03:44.3	42
Eden Girloanta; Chaya Zabludoff; Shahar Resman; Yuval Safra	Mixed team	58:20.7	15

== Swimming ==
Israeli swimmers have achieved qualifying standards in the following events (up to a maximum of 2 swimmers in each event at the A-standard entry time, and 1 at the B-standard):

Men

Athlete	Event	Heat		Semifinal		Final	
Athlete	Event	Time	Rank	Time	Rank	Time	Rank
Guy Barnea	50 m backstroke	25.52	24	Did not advance			
Meiron Cheruti	50 m freestyle	22.80	=41	Did not advance			
Tomer Frankel	200 m freestyle	1:51.80	54	Did not advance			
Etay Gurevich	200 m butterfly	1:59.87	27	Did not advance			
Etay Gurevich	400 m individual medley	4:22.66	27	—N/a		Did not advance	
Marc Hinawi	400 m freestyle	3:57.43	39	—N/a		Did not advance	
Marc Hinawi	800 m freestyle	8:12.39	27	—N/a		Did not advance	
Liran Konovalov	100 m freestyle	50.16	52	Did not advance			
Jonatan Kopelev	50 m backstroke	24.86	=6 Q	24.84	8 Q	24.85	8
Marcus Schlesinger	50 m butterfly	24.00	27	Did not advance			
Marcus Schlesinger	100 m butterfly	53.20	36	Did not advance			
Yakov Toumarkin	100 m backstroke	54.39	14 Q	53.92	11	Did not advance	
Yakov Toumarkin	200 m backstroke	1:59.25	23	Did not advance			
Yakov Toumarkin	200 m individual medley	1:59.49	10 Q	1:59.98	16	Did not advance	
Tomer Frankel; Liran Konovalov; Denis Loktev; Yakov Toumarkin	4×100 m freestyle relay	3:21.23	17	—N/a		Did not advance	
Tomer Frankel; Liran Konovalov; Denis Loktev; Daniel Namir	4×200 m freestyle relay	7:19.32	16	—N/a		Did not advance	

Women

Athlete	Event	Heat		Semifinal		Final	
Athlete	Event	Time	Rank	Time	Rank	Time	Rank
Amit Ivry	50 m breaststroke	31.70	23	Did not advance			
Amit Ivry	50 m butterfly	26.88	26	Did not advance			
Andrea Murez	100 m freestyle	54.49 NR	16 Q*	54.62	16	Did not advance	
Andrea Murez	200 m freestyle	1:59.75	19	Did not advance			
Zohar Shikler	50 m freestyle	25.65	30	Did not advance			
Keren Siebner	100 m butterfly	59.72	24	Did not advance			
Amit Ivry; Andrea Murez; Zohar Shikler; Keren Siebner	4×100 m freestyle relay	3:44.35	11	—N/a		Did not advance	
Amit Ivry; Andrea Murez; Zohar Shikler; Keren Siebner	4×100 m medley relay	4:10.35	14	—N/a		Did not advance	

* Murez won the swim-off race against Netherlands' Maud van der Meer to compete in the semifinals.

Mixed

Athlete	Event	Heat		Final	
Athlete	Event	Time	Rank	Time	Rank
Liran Konovalov; Andrea Murez; Marcus Schlesinger; Keren Siebner	4×100 m freestyle relay	3:31.16	11	Did not advance	

== Synchronized swimming ==
Israel's synchronized swimming team consisted of 10 athletes (10 female).

Women

Athlete	Event	Preliminaries		Final	
Athlete	Event	Points	Rank	Points	Rank
Yael Polka	Solo free routine	77.9000	18	Did not advance	
Eden Blecher; Yael Polka	Duet technical routine	74.8385	27	Did not advance	
Eden Blecher; Yael Polka	Duet free routine	75.2000	31	Did not advance	
Eden Blecher; Shelly Bobritsky; Elina Chalemsky; Natali Cutic; Anastasia Furman; Emili Green (R); Gal Litman; Tali Ostrovsky; Yael Polka (R); Inna Yoffe	Team technical routine	72.3289	21	Did not advance	
Eden Blecher; Shelly Bobritsky; Elina Chalemsky; Natali Cutic; Anastasia Furman; Emili Green; Gal Litman; Tali Ostrovsky; Yael Polka (R)	Team free routine	73.0667	22	Did not advance	

Legend: (R) = Reserve Athlete
