= Israel at the 2023 World Aquatics Championships =

- Flag of Israel
- FINA code: ISR
- National federation: Israel Swimming Association
- Website: isr.org.il (in Hebrew)

in Fukuoka, Japan
- Competitors: 43 in 4 sports
- Medals: Gold 0 Silver 0 Bronze 0 Total 0

World Aquatics Championships appearances
- 1973; 1975; 1978; 1982; 1986; 1991; 1994; 1998; 2001; 2003; 2005; 2007; 2009; 2011; 2013; 2015; 2017; 2019; 2022; 2023; 2024

Israel is set to compete at the 2023 World Aquatics Championships in Fukuoka, Japan from 14 to 30 July.

== Athletes by discipline ==
The following is the list of number of competitors participating at the Championships per discipline.

Sport	Men	Women	Total
Artistic swimming	0	10	10
Open water swimming	3	2	5
Swimming	8	5	13
Water polo	0	15	15
Total	11	32	43

== Artistic swimming ==
Women

Athlete	Event	Preliminaries		Final	
Athlete	Event	Points	Rank	Points	Rank
Shelly Bobritsky; Ariel Nassee	Duet technical routine	248.7284	5 Q	182.7332	12
Shelly Bobritsky; Ariel Nassee	Duet free routine	225.1625	4 Q	236.1334	4

Mixed

Athlete	Event	Preliminaries		Final	
Athlete	Event	Points	Rank	Points	Rank
Eden Blecher; Shelly Bobritsky; Maya Dorf; Catherine Kunin; Nikol Nahshonov; Ariel Nassee; Neta Rubichek; Shani Sharaizin	Team acrobatic routine	198.4967	8 Q	199.9667	8
Eden Blecher; Shelly Bobritsky; Maya Dorf; Noy Gazala; Catherine Kunin; Nikol Nahshonov; Ariel Nassee; Neta Rubichek	Team technical routine	247.1383	5 Q	248.4117	8
Shelly Bobritsky; Maya Dorf; Noy Gazala; Catherine Kunin; Aya Mazor; Nikol Nahshonov; Ariel Nassee; Neta Rubichek	Team free routine	251.9394	6 Q	247.7290	5

== Open water swimming ==
Israel entered 5 open water swimmers.

Men

Athlete	Event	Time	Rank
Yonatan Ahdot	Men's 10 km	1:57:05.2	35
Ziv Cohen	Men's 5 km	1:00:10.6	46
Matan Roditi	Men's 10 km	1:51:43.8	8

Women

Athlete	Event	Time	Rank
Eva Fabian	Women's 5 km	1:01:11.4	17
Eva Fabian	Women's 10 km	2:05:05.0	25
Orin Gavlan	Women's 5 km	1:06:57.1	48

Mixed

Athlete	Event	Time	Rank
Yonatan Ahdot; Eva Fabian; Orin Gavlan; Matan Roditi	Team relay	1:15:52.3	13

== Swimming ==
Israel entered 14 swimmers.

Men

Athlete	Event	Heat		Semifinal		Final	
Athlete	Event	Time	Rank	Time	Rank	Time	Rank
Meiron Cheruti	50 metre freestyle	21.85	6 Q	22.04	14	Did not advance	
Meiron Cheruti	50 metre butterfly	23.40	18	Did not advance			
Tomer Frankel	100 metre freestyle	48.78	28	Did not advance			
Tomer Frankel	50 metre butterfly	23.48	22	Did not advance			
Tomer Frankel	100 metre butterfly	51.76	15 Q	52.04	16	Did not advance	
Gal Cohen Groumi	100 metre butterfly	51.61	13 Q	50.98 NR	5 Q	51.32	8
Gal Cohen Groumi	200 metre individual medley	2:00.00	20	Did not advance			
Michael Laitarovsky	50 metre backstroke	25.10	15	24.99	11	Did not advance	
Michael Laitarovsky	100 metre backstroke	55.63	33	Did not advance			
Denis Loktev	200 metre freestyle	1:47.08	21	Did not advance			
Ron Polonsky	200 metre breaststroke	2:12.34	21	Did not advance			
Ron Polonsky	200 metre individual medley	1:59.15	17	Did not advance			
Bar Soloveychik	400 metre freestyle	3:49.21	18	—		Did not advance	
Bar Soloveychik	800 metre freestyle	7:59.65	26	—		Did not advance	
Tomer Frankel; Denis Loktev; Ron Polonsky; Gal Cohen Groumi	4 × 100 m freestyle relay	3:14.03 NR	8 Q	—		3:14.53	7
Denis Loktev; Tomer Frankel; Daniel Namir; Gal Cohen Groumi	4 × 200 m freestyle relay	7:09.78	10	—		Did not advance	
Michael Laitarovsky; Ron Polonsky; Gal Cohen Groumi; Tomer Frankel	4 × 100 m medley relay	3:36.47	17	—		Did not advance	

Women

Athlete	Event	Heat		Semifinal		Final	
Athlete	Event	Time	Rank	Time	Rank	Time	Rank
Aviv Barzelay	100 metre backstroke	1:01.66	28	Did not advance			
Aviv Barzelay	200 metre backstroke	Disqualified		Did not advance			
Daria Golovaty	50 metre freestyle	26.11	44	Did not advance			
Daria Golovaty	200 metre freestyle	1:59.77	27	Did not advance			
Daria Golovaty	400 metre freestyle	4:14.33	27	—		Did not advance	
Anastasia Gorbenko	200 metre freestyle	1:59.27	23	Did not advance			
Anastasia Gorbenko	50 metre backstroke	Did not start					
Anastasia Gorbenko	50 metre breaststroke	31.41	25	Did not advance			
Anastasia Gorbenko	100 metre breaststroke	1:08.66	29	Did not advance			
Anastasia Gorbenko	200 metre individual medley	2:10.88	10 Q	2:10.62	8 Q	2:10.08	5
Anastasia Gorbenko	400 metre individual medley	4:49.64	26	—		Did not advance	
Lea Polonsky	200 metre butterfly	2:12.62	22	Did not advance			
Lea Polonsky	200 metre individual medley	2:14.05	21	Did not advance			
Anastasia Gorbenko; Daria Golovaty; Ayla Spitz; Lea Polonsky	4 × 200 m freestyle relay	7:59.02 NR	10	—		Did not advance	
Aviv Barzelay; Anastasia Gorbenko; Lea Polonsky; Daria Golovaty	4 × 100 m medley relay	4:05.57	19	—		Did not advance	

Mixed

Athlete	Event	Heat		Final	
Athlete	Event	Time	Rank	Time	Rank
Denis Loktev; Meiron Cheruti; Anastasia Gorbenko; Daria Golovaty	4 × 100 m freestyle relay	3:28.78	14	Did not advance	
Anastasia Gorbenko; Ron Polonsky; Tomer Frankel; Daria Golovaty	4 × 100 m medley relay	3:47.76	15	Did not advance	

== Water polo ==
Summary

Team	Event	Group stage				Playoff	Quarterfinal	Semifinal	Final / BM	
Team	Event	Opposition Score	Opposition Score	Opposition Score	Rank	Opposition Score	Opposition Score	Opposition Score	Opposition Score	Rank
Israel	Women's tournament	Kazakhstan; W 17–6	Spain; L 5–22	Netherlands; L 8–24	3 QP	Australia; L 7–16	—	New Zealand; W 15–12	France; L 7–11	10

=== Women's tournament ===
Team roster

The following is the Israeli roster.

Head coach: Dimitris Mavrotas

- 1 Maria Bogachenko GK
- 2 Yahav Farkash FP
- 3 Hila Futorian FP
- 4 Ronny Gazit FP
- 5 Michal Katz FP
- 6 Veronika Kordonskaia FP
- 7 Tahel Levi FP
- 8 Noga Levinshtein FP
- 9 Noa Markovsky FP
- 10 Dar Menakerman FP
- 11 Dina Namakshtansky FP
- 12 Ayelet Peres FP
- 13 Noa Sasover GK
- Shunit Strugo FP
- Alma Yaacobi FP

Group play

Pos	Team	Pld	W	PSW	PSL	L	GF	GA	GD	Pts	Qualification
1	Netherlands	3	3	0	0	0	61	16	+45	9	Quarterfinals
2	Spain	3	2	0	0	1	52	17	+35	6	Playoffs
3	Israel	3	1	0	0	2	30	52	−22	3	Playoffs
4	Kazakhstan	3	0	0	0	3	13	71	−58	0	

Source: Sportresult
Rules for classification: 1) points; 2) head-to-head points; 3) head-to-head goal difference; 4) head-to-head number of goals scored; 5) Goal difference.

16 July 2023; 13:30	Report	Israel	17–6	Kazakhstan	Marine Messe Fukuoka, Fukuoka; Referees: Natalia Markopoulou (GRE), Lee-Anne Stewart (RSA)
16 July 2023; 13:30	Report	Score by quarters: 5–3, 6–1, 2–2, 4–0			Marine Messe Fukuoka, Fukuoka; Referees: Natalia Markopoulou (GRE), Lee-Anne Stewart (RSA)
16 July 2023; 13:30	Report	three players 4	Goals	Khritankova, Mirshina 2	Marine Messe Fukuoka, Fukuoka; Referees: Natalia Markopoulou (GRE), Lee-Anne Stewart (RSA)

18 July 2023; 10:30	Report	Spain	22–5	Israel	Marine Messe Fukuoka, Fukuoka; Referees: Lee-Anne Stewart (RSA), David Couper (NZL)
18 July 2023; 10:30	Report	Score by quarters: 5–2, 5–1, 5–0, 7–2			Marine Messe Fukuoka, Fukuoka; Referees: Lee-Anne Stewart (RSA), David Couper (NZL)
18 July 2023; 10:30	Report	Camus, A. Ruiz 4	Goals	five players 1	Marine Messe Fukuoka, Fukuoka; Referees: Lee-Anne Stewart (RSA), David Couper (NZL)

20 July 2023; 20:30	Report	Israel	8–24	Netherlands	Marine Messe Fukuoka, Fukuoka; Referees: Natalia Markopoulou (GRE), David Couper (NZL)
20 July 2023; 20:30	Report	Score by quarters: 1–7, 1–6, 2–5, 4–6			Marine Messe Fukuoka, Fukuoka; Referees: Natalia Markopoulou (GRE), David Couper (NZL)
20 July 2023; 20:30	Report	Futorian 3	Goals	Joustra 5	Marine Messe Fukuoka, Fukuoka; Referees: Natalia Markopoulou (GRE), David Couper (NZL)

Playoffs

22 July 2023; 14:00	Report	Australia	16–7	Israel	Marine Messe Fukuoka, Fukuoka; Referees: Marta Cabanas (ESP), Adil Aimbetov (KAZ)
22 July 2023; 14:00	Report	Score by quarters: 7–2, 4–1, 3–1, 2–3			Marine Messe Fukuoka, Fukuoka; Referees: Marta Cabanas (ESP), Adil Aimbetov (KAZ)
22 July 2023; 14:00	Report	Armit 4	Goals	Kordonskaia 3	Marine Messe Fukuoka, Fukuoka; Referees: Marta Cabanas (ESP), Adil Aimbetov (KAZ)

9–12th place semifinals

24 July 2023; 12:00	Report	Israel	15–12	New Zealand	Marine Messe Fukuoka, Fukuoka; Referees: Nóra Debreceni (HUN), Chisato Kurosaki (JPN)
24 July 2023; 12:00	Report	Score by quarters: 3–1, 5–3, 5–2, 2–6			Marine Messe Fukuoka, Fukuoka; Referees: Nóra Debreceni (HUN), Chisato Kurosaki (JPN)
24 July 2023; 12:00	Report	Strugo 4	Goals	Houghton, Nicholson 3	Marine Messe Fukuoka, Fukuoka; Referees: Nóra Debreceni (HUN), Chisato Kurosaki (JPN)

Ninth place game

26 July 2023; 10:30	Report	Israel	7–11	France	Marine Messe Fukuoka, Fukuoka; Referees: Nicola Johnson (AUS), Natalia Markopoulou (GRE)
26 July 2023; 10:30	Report	Score by quarters: 2–3, 1–4, 1–4, 3–0			Marine Messe Fukuoka, Fukuoka; Referees: Nicola Johnson (AUS), Natalia Markopoulou (GRE)
26 July 2023; 10:30	Report	Bogachenko 4	Goals	Millot 3	Marine Messe Fukuoka, Fukuoka; Referees: Nicola Johnson (AUS), Natalia Markopoulou (GRE)
