= Israel at the 2019 World Aquatics Championships =

- Flag of Israel
- FINA code: ISR
- National federation: Israel Swimming Association
- Website: isr.org.il (in Hebrew)

in Gwangju, South Korea
- Competitors: 26 in 3 sports
- Medals: Gold 0 Silver 0 Bronze 0 Total 0

World Aquatics Championships appearances
- 1973; 1975; 1978; 1982; 1986; 1991; 1994; 1998; 2001; 2003; 2005; 2007; 2009; 2011; 2013; 2015; 2017; 2019; 2022; 2023; 2024

Israel competed at the 2019 World Aquatics Championships in Gwangju, South Korea from 12 to 28 July.

== Artistic swimming ==
Israel entered 10 artistic swimmers.

Women

Athlete	Event	Preliminaries		Final	
Athlete	Event	Points	Rank	Points	Rank
Eden Blecher; Shelly Bobritsky	Duet technical routine	80.3788	19	Did not advance	
Eden Blecher; Shelly Bobritsky	Duet free routine	81.8333	18	Did not advance	
Eden Blecher; Shelly Bobritsky; Elina Chalemsky; Gal Litman; Nikol Nahshonov; Ariel Nassee; Tali Ostrovsky; Yael Polka; Maya Dorf (R); Emili Green (R)	Team technical routine	81.9659	12 Q	82.5039	12
Eden Blecher; Shelly Bobritsky; Elina Chalemsky; Gal Litman; Nikol Nahshonov; Ariel Nassee; Tali Ostrovsky; Yael Polka; Maya Dorf (R); Emili Green (R)	Team free routine	82.9333	12 Q	83.2667	12
Eden Blecher; Shelly Bobritsky; Elina Chalemsky; Maya Dorf; Emili Green; Gal Litman; Nikol Nahshonov; Ariel Nassee; Tali Ostrovsky; Yael Polka	Highlight routine	—		83.7000	6
Eden Blecher; Shelly Bobritsky; Elina Chalemsky; Maya Dorf; Emili Green; Gal Litman; Nikol Nahshonov; Ariel Nassee; Tali Ostrovsky; Yael Polka	Free routine combination	83.6333	7 Q	83.7667	7

Legend: (R) = Reserve Athlete

== Open water swimming ==
Israel qualified three male and two female open water swimmers.

Men

Athlete	Event	Time	Rank
Matan Roditi	Men's 10 km	1:48:59.6	20
Yonatan Rosin	Men's 5 km	53:45.8	29
Yuval Safra	Men's 5 km	53:41.9	=19
Yuval Safra	Men's 10 km	1:50:34.2	43
Yuval Safra	Men's 25 km	4:54:38.7	12

Women

Athlete	Event	Time	Rank
Eva Fabian	Women's 5 km	58:18.0	27
Eva Fabian	Women's 10 km	1:55:44.8	28
Eden Girloanta	Women's 5 km	1:01:37.1	35
Eden Girloanta	Women's 10 km	2:00:34.6	38

Mixed

Athlete	Event	Time	Rank
Eva Fabian; Eden Girloanta; Matan Roditi; Yonatan Rosin	Team	57:24.5	16

== Swimming ==
Israel entered 11 swimmers.

Men

Athlete	Event	Heat		Semifinal		Final	
Athlete	Event	Time	Rank	Time	Rank	Time	Rank
Meiron Cheruti	50 m freestyle	22.06	12 Q	22.01	14	Did not advance	
Meiron Cheruti	100 m freestyle	49.82	38	Did not advance			
Meiron Cheruti	50 m butterfly	23.49	12 Q	23.62	15	Did not advance	
Tomer Frankel	100 m butterfly	52.36	13 Q	52.15	15	Did not advance	
Itay Goldfaden	50 m breaststroke	27.67	=25	Did not advance			
Itay Goldfaden	100 m breaststroke	1:01.69	37	Did not advance			
Jonatan Kopelev	50 m backstroke	25.11	=12 Q	25.02	13	Did not advance	
Michael Laitarovsky	50 m backstroke	25.26	16 Q	25.01	12	Did not advance	
Denis Loktev	200 m freestyle	1:48.76	30	Did not advance			
Denis Loktev	400 m freestyle	3:54.53	28	—		Did not advance	
Yakov Toumarkin	100 m backstroke	54.29	=22	Did not advance			
Yakov Toumarkin	200 m backstroke	1:59.79	25	Did not advance			
Yakov Toumarkin	200 m individual medley	2:00.97	22	Did not advance			
Tomer Frankel; Meiron Cheruti; Yakov Toumarkin; Daniel Namir	4×100 m freestyle relay	DSQ		—		Did not advance	
Denis Loktev; Daniel Namir; Tomer Frankel; Gal Cohen Groumi	4×200 m freestyle relay	7:11.99 NR	10	—		Did not advance	
Yakov Toumarkin; Itay Goldfaden; Tomer Frankel; Meiron Cheruti	4×100 m medley relay	3:37.51	20	—		Did not advance	

Women

Athlete	Event	Heat		Semifinal		Final	
Athlete	Event	Time	Rank	Time	Rank	Time	Rank
Anastasia Gorbenko	100 m backstroke	1:01.77	32	Did not advance			
Anastasia Gorbenko	200 m breaststroke	2:30.67	26	Did not advance			
Anastasia Gorbenko	50 m butterfly	26.70	23	Did not advance			
Anastasia Gorbenko	200 m individual medley	2:11.92	11 Q	2:13.90	16	Did not advance	
Andrea Murez	50 m freestyle	25.40	=25	Did not advance			
Andrea Murez	100 m freestyle	54.67	21	Did not advance			

Mixed

Athlete	Event	Heat		Final	
Athlete	Event	Time	Rank	Time	Rank
Tomer Frankel; Meiron Cheruti; Anastasia Gorbenko; Andrea Murez	4×100 m freestyle relay	DSQ		Did not advance	
Anastasia Gorbenko; Itay Goldfaden; Tomer Frankel; Andrea Murez	4×100 m medley relay	3:48.06	10	Did not advance	
