= Israel at the 2024 World Aquatics Championships =

- Flag of Israel
- World Aquatics code: ISR
- National federation: Israel Swimming Association
- Website: isr.org.il (in Hebrew)

in Doha, Qatar
- Competitors: 16 in 3 sports
- Medals Ranked 27th: Gold 0 Silver 1 Bronze 0 Total 1

World Aquatics Championships appearances
- 1973; 1975; 1978; 1982; 1986; 1991; 1994; 1998; 2001; 2003; 2005; 2007; 2009; 2011; 2013; 2015; 2017; 2019; 2022; 2023; 2024; 2025

Israel competed at the 2024 World Aquatics Championships in Doha, Qatar from 2 to 18 February.

== Medalists ==
Medal	Name	Sport	Event	Date
2nd place, silver medalist(s)	Anastasia Gorbenko	Swimming	Women's 400 metre individual medley	18 February 2024

== Competitors ==
The following is the list of competitors in the Championships.

Sport	Men	Women	Total
Artistic swimming	0	9	9
Open water swimming	2	2	4
Swimming	1	2	3
Total	3	13	16

== Artistic swimming ==
Women

Athlete	Event	Preliminaries		Final	
Athlete	Event	Points	Rank	Points	Rank
Shelly Bobritsky; Ariel Nassee	Duet technical routine	251.7183	5 Q	251.2432	5
Shelly Bobritsky; Ariel Nassee	Duet free routine	226.7439	9 Q	228.4708	9

Mixed

Athlete	Event	Preliminaries		Final	
Athlete	Event	Points	Rank	Points	Rank
Eden Blecher; Shelly Bobritsky; Maya Dorf; Catherine Kunin; Aya Mazor; Nikol Nahshonov; Ariel Nassee; Neta Rubichek	Team technical routine	226.3484	8 Q	237.6533	7
Shelly Bobritsky; Maya Dorf; Noy Gazala; Catherine Kunin; Aya Mazor; Nikol Nahshonov; Ariel Nassee; Neta Rubichek	Team free routine	282.3667	7 Q	259.3188	8
Eden Blecher; Shelly Bobritsky; Maya Dorf; Noy Gazala; Catherine Kunin; Nikol Nahshonov; Ariel Nassee; Neta Rubichek	Team acrobatic routine	206.8200	10 Q	188.5401	9

== Open water swimming ==
Men

Athlete	Event	Time	Rank
Ido Gal	Men's 10 km	1:52:08.7	37
Matan Roditi	Men's 10 km	1:48:31.7	10

Women

Athlete	Event	Time	Rank
Eva Fabian	Women's 10 km	2:02:19.8	32
Eden Girloanta	Women's 10 km	2:03:56.7	34

== Swimming ==
Israel entered 3 swimmers.

Men

Athlete	Event	Heat		Semifinal		Final	
Athlete	Event	Time	Rank	Time	Rank	Time	Rank
Denis Loktev	100 metre freestyle	49.50	32	Did not advance			
Denis Loktev	200 metre freestyle	1:47.37	16 Q	1:47.11	13	Did not advance	

Women

Athlete	Event	Heat		Semifinal		Final	
Athlete	Event	Time	Rank	Time	Rank	Time	Rank
Daria Golovaty	100 metre freestyle	55.71	21	Did not advance			
Daria Golovaty	200 metre freestyle	1:59.11	14 Q	1:59.36	14	Did not advance	
Daria Golovaty	400 metre freestyle	4:14.42	17	—		Did not advance	
Anastasia Gorbenko	200 metre freestyle	2:00.25	24	Did not advance			
Anastasia Gorbenko	200 metre backstroke	2:11.78	9 Q	2:10.94	9	Did not advance	
Anastasia Gorbenko	200 metre individual medley	2:12.76	8 Q	2:10.15	4 Q	2:10.17	4
Anastasia Gorbenko	400 metre individual medley	4:42.79	5 Q	—		4:37.36 NR	2nd place, silver medalist(s)
