= Israel at the 2009 World Aquatics Championships =

- Flag of Israel
- World Aquatics code: ISR
- National federation: Israel Swimming Association
- Website: www.isr.org.il

in Budapest, Hungary
- Competitors: in - sports
- Medals: Gold 0 Silver 0 Bronze 0 Total 0

World Aquatics Championships appearances
- 1973; 1975; 1978; 1982; 1986; 1991; 1994; 1998; 2001; 2003; 2005; 2007; 2009; 2011; 2013; 2015; 2017; 2019; 2022; 2023; 2024; 2025

Israel competed at the 2009 World Aquatics Championships in Rome, Italy from 26 July to 2 August.

== Swimming ==
Men

Athlete	Event	Heat		Semifinal		Final	
Athlete	Event	Time	Rank	Time	Rank	Time	Rank
Nimrod Shapira Bar-Or	50 m freestyle	22.90	49	did not advance			
Nimrod Shapira Bar-Or	100 m freestyle	48.93 NR	29	did not advance			
Nimrod Shapira Bar-Or	200 m freestyle	1:48.63	31	did not advance			
Itai Chammah	100 m backstroke	56.15	41	did not advance			
Itai Chammah	100 m backstroke	2:01.86	43	did not advance			
Gal Nevo	200 m freestyle	1:50.52	51	did not advance			
Gal Nevo	50 m backstroke	24.79	10 Q	24.81	12	did not advance	
Gal Nevo	100 m backstroke	54.51	22	did not advance			
Gal Nevo	200 m breaststroke	2:15.49	40	did not advance			
Gal Nevo	200 m butterfly	1:57.02 NR	19	did not advance			
Gal Nevo	200 m individual medley	1:58.55 NR	8	1:58.25 NR	9	did not advance	
Gal Nevo	400 m individual medley	4:11.51 NR	6	—N/a		4:12.33	6
Nadav Kochavi	200m backstroke	25.94	37	did not advance			
Nadav Kochavi	50 m butterfly	24.74	73	did not advance			
Nadav Kochavi	100 m butterfly	54.20	71	did not advance			
Ehud Segal	200 m backstroke	2:06.91	49	did not advance			
Michael Malul	50 m breaststroke	27.60	24	did not advance			
Tom Beeri	100 m breaststroke	1:03.94	74	did not advance			
Tom Beeri	200 m breaststroke	2:14.59	36	did not advance			
Alon Mandel	50 m butterfly	23.90	31 NR	did not advance			
Alon Mandel	100 m butterfly	52.68 NR	44	did not advance			
Alon Mandel	200 m butterfly	2:01.79	43	did not advance			
Guy Barnea; Tom Be'eri; Alon Mandel; Nimrod Shapira Bar Or	4 × 100 m medley relay	3:36.23 NR	17	—N/a		did not advance	

Women

Athlete	Event	Heat		Semifinal		Final	
Athlete	Event	Time	Rank	Time	Rank	Time	Rank
Kristina Tchernychev	100 m freestyle	58.53	78	did not advance			
Kristina Tchernychev	50 m butterfly	27.88	52	did not advance			
Kristina Tchernychev	100 m butterfly	1.00:32	37	did not advance			
Amit Ivry	50 m backstroke	30.32	62	did not advance			
Amit Ivry	50 m butterfly	26.59	23	did not advance			
Amit Ivry	100 m butterfly	59.02	25	did not advance			
Anna Volchkov	50 m backstroke	30.59	68	did not advance			
Anna Volchkov	200m backstroke	2:15.61	28	did not advance			
Yuliya Banach	50 m breaststroke	31.98 NR	37	did not advance			
Yuliya Banach	100 m breaststroke	1:09.18	31	did not advance			
Yuliya Banach	200 m breaststroke	2:33.95	43	did not advance			
Doaa Reda Masarwa	50 m breaststroke	32.46	43	did not advance			
Anastasia Korotkov	100 m breaststroke	1:10.46	39	did not advance			
Anastasia Korotkov	200 m breaststroke	2:30.17 NR	31	did not advance			
Anastasia Korotkov	200 m individual medley	2.17:29	40	did not advance			
Anna Volchkov; Yuliya Banach; Amit Ivry; Kristina Tchernychev	4 × 100 m medley relayrelay	4:09.49 NR	20	—N/a		did not advance	

== Synchronized swimming ==
Legend: (R) = Reserve Athlete
