= Israel at the 2015 World Aquatics Championships =

- Flag of Israel
- FINA code: ISR
- National federation: Israel Swimming Association
- Website: www.one.co.il

in Kazan, Russia
- Competitors: 16 in 3 sports
- Medals: Gold 0 Silver 0 Bronze 0 Total 0

World Aquatics Championships appearances
- 1973; 1975; 1978; 1982; 1986; 1991; 1994; 1998; 2001; 2003; 2005; 2007; 2009; 2011; 2013; 2015; 2017; 2019; 2022; 2023; 2024

Israel competed at the 2015 World Aquatics Championships in Kazan, Russia from 24 July to 9 August 2015.

== Open water swimming ==
Israel has qualified two swimmers to compete in the open water marathon.

Athlete	Event	Time	Rank
Shahar Resman	Men's 10 km	1:53:05.1	42
Shahar Resman	Men's 25 km	Did not finish	
Yuval Safra	Men's 5 km	55:33.2	26
Yuval Safra	Men's 25 km	5:02:52.9	12
Shai Toledano	Men's 5 km	56:06.0	34
Shai Toledano	Men's 10 km	1:56:27.9	53

== Swimming ==
Israeli swimmers have achieved qualifying standards in the following events (up to a maximum of two swimmers in each event at the A-standard entry time, and one at the B-standard):

Men

Athlete	Event	Heat		Semifinal		Final	
Athlete	Event	Time	Rank	Time	Rank	Time	Rank
Guy Barnea	50 m backstroke	25.31	18	Did not advance			
Guy Barnea	100 m butterfly	53.76	=37	Did not advance			
David Gamburg	100 m freestyle	49.98	38	Did not advance			
Ido Haber	400 m freestyle	3:52.08 NR	36	—		Did not advance	
Ido Haber	800 m freestyle	8:07.78	33	—		Did not advance	
Liran Konovalov	200 m freestyle	1:49.56	36	Did not advance			
Jonatan Kopelev	50 m backstroke	25.14	10 Q	25.04	11	Did not advance	
Gal Nevo	200 m butterfly	1:59.45	27	Did not advance			
Gal Nevo	400 m individual medley	4:17.34	14	—		Did not advance	
Yakov Toumarkin	100 m backstroke	53.92	12 Q	53.77 NR	12	Did not advance	
Yakov Toumarkin	200 m backstroke	1:58.64	17	Did not advance			
Yakov Toumarkin	200 m individual medley	1:59.97	14 Q	1:58.86	11	Did not advance	
Tomer Zamir	50 m butterfly	24.49	37	Did not advance			
Liran Konovalov; Yakov Toumarkin; Ziv Kalontorov; David Gamburg	4×100 m freestyle relay	3:18.31 NR	17	—		Did not advance	

Women

Athlete	Event	Heat		Semifinal		Final	
Athlete	Event	Time	Rank	Time	Rank	Time	Rank
Amit Ivry	50 m backstroke	29.50	33	Did not advance			
Amit Ivry	50 m breaststroke	31.39	20	Did not advance			
Amit Ivry	100 m breaststroke	1:09.08	28	Did not advance			
Amit Ivry	50 m butterfly	26.90	=26	Did not advance			
Amit Ivry	200 m individual medley	2:18.35	34	Did not advance			
Zoher Shikler	50 m freestyle	26.19	47	Did not advance			
Zoher Shikler	100 m freestyle	56.84	43	Did not advance			

== Synchronized swimming ==
Israel has qualified two synchronized swimmers to compete in each of the following events.

Athlete	Event	Preliminaries		Final	
Athlete	Event	Points	Rank	Points	Rank
Anastasia Gloushkov	Solo technical routine	82.9353	9 Q	84.3204	10
Anastasia Gloushkov	Solo free routine	85.4000	11 Q	85.3000	11
Anastasia Gloushkov; Yevgeniya Tetelbaum	Duet technical routine	79.0927	20	Did not advance	
Anastasia Gloushkov; Yevgeniya Tetelbaum	Duet free routine	79.8333	19	Did not advance	
