= Israel at the 2011 World Aquatics Championships =

- Flag of Israel
- FINA code: ISR
- National federation: Israel Swimming Association
- Website: www.one.co.il
- Medals: Gold 0 Silver 0 Bronze 0 Total 0

World Aquatics Championships appearances
- 1973; 1975; 1978; 1982; 1986; 1991; 1994; 1998; 2001; 2003; 2005; 2007; 2009; 2011; 2013; 2015; 2017; 2019; 2022; 2023; 2024

Flag of Israel

Israel competed at the 2011 World Aquatics Championships in Shanghai, China between July 16 and 31, 2011.

== Open water swimming ==
Men

Athlete	Event	Time	Rank
Yuval Safra	Men's 5km	56:34.2	18
Yuval Safra	Men's 10km	1:58:48.3	37

== Swimming ==
Israel has qualified 7 athletes in swimming.

Athlete	Event	Heats		Semifinals		Final	
Athlete	Event	Time	Rank	Time	Rank	Time	Rank
Men
Nimrod Shapira Bar-Or	100m Freestyle	49.91	35	Did not advance			
Nimrod Shapira Bar-Or	200m Freestyle	1:48.11	12 Q	1:48.59	15	Did not advance	
Guy Barnea	50m Backstroke	25.18	7 Q	25.09	8 Q	25.01	6
Guy Barnea	100m Backstroke	54.43	16	Did not advance			
Jonatan Kopelev	100m Backstroke	54.90	25	Did not advance			
Yakov-Yan Toumarkin	200m Backstroke	1:58.21 NR	11 Q	1:59.92	16	Did not advance	
Gal Nevo	100m Breaststroke	1:02.32	45	Did not advance			
Gal Nevo	200m Butterfly	1:59.68	27	Did not advance			
Gal Nevo	200m Individual Medley	1:59.98	15 Q	1:59.67	11	Did not advance	
Gal Nevo	400m Individual Medley	4:25.96	23			Did not advance	
Women
Anna Volchkov	50m Backstroke	30.59	44	Did not advance			
Anna Volchkov	100m Backstroke	1:03.12	34	Did not advance			
Anna Volchkov	200m Backstroke	2:13.99 NR	25	Did not advance			
Amit Ivry	50m Butterfly	26.83	16 Q	26.79	16	Did not advance	
Amit Ivry	100m Butterfly	59.56	24	Did not advance			

== Synchronised swimming ==
Israel has qualified 3 athletes in synchronised swimming.

Women

Athlete	Event	Preliminary		Final	
Athlete	Event	Points	Rank	Points	Rank
Anastasia Gloushkov	Solo Technical Routine	87.700	10 Q	87.500	10
Anastasia Gloushkov	Solo Free Routine	85.990	11 Q	86.600	10
Anastasia Gloushkov; Inna Yoffe	Duet Technical Routine	86.000	14	Did not advance	
Anastasia Gloushkov; Inna Yoffe	Duet Free Routine	84.840	18	Did not advance	

Reserve

- Ievgeniia Teltelbaum
