= Israel at the 2013 World Aquatics Championships =

- Flag of Israel
- FINA code: ISR
- National federation: Israel Swimming Association
- Website: www.one.co.il

in Barcelona, Spain
- Medals: Gold 0 Silver 0 Bronze 0 Total 0

World Aquatics Championships appearances
- 1973; 1975; 1978; 1982; 1986; 1991; 1994; 1998; 2001; 2003; 2005; 2007; 2009; 2011; 2013; 2015; 2017; 2019; 2022; 2023; 2024

Israel competed at the 2013 World Aquatics Championships in Barcelona, Spain between 19 July and 4 August 2013.

== Open water swimming ==
Israel qualified two quota places for the following events in open water swimming.

Athlete	Event	Time	Rank
Shahar Resman	Men's 10 km	1:51:13.6	46
Shahar Resman	Men's 25 km	4:48:53.5	11
Yuval Safra	Men's 5 km	53:43.8	17
Yuval Safra	Men's 10 km	1:50:23.5	36

== Swimming ==
Israeli swimmers earned qualifying standards in the following events (up to a maximum of 2 swimmers in each event at the A-standard entry time, and 1 at the B-standard):

Men

Athlete	Event	Heat		Semifinal		Final	
Athlete	Event	Time	Rank	Time	Rank	Time	Rank
Nimrod Shapira Bar-Or	200 m freestyle	1:49.78	33	Did not advance			
Guy Barnea	50 m backstroke	25.01	=8 Q	24.73	3 Q	25.14	7
Imri Ganiel	50 m breaststroke	28.48	=45	Did not advance			
Imri Ganiel	100 m breaststroke	1:01.77	=34	Did not advance			
Jonatan Kopelev	50 m backstroke	25.17	12 Q	24.95	=7 Q	25.19	8
Gal Nevo	200 m breaststroke	2:14.94	28	Did not advance			
Gal Nevo	200 m butterfly	1:59.37	25	Did not advance			
Gal Nevo	200 m individual medley	2:00.01	18	Did not advance			
Gal Nevo	400 m individual medley	4:17.95	15	—		Did not advance	
Yakov-Yan Toumarkin	100 m backstroke	54.85	19	Did not advance			
Yakov-Yan Toumarkin	200 m backstroke	1:59.39	18	Did not advance			
Yakov-Yan Toumarkin	200 m individual medley	2:00.13	20	Did not advance			
Tomer Zamir	50 m butterfly	25.06	46	Did not advance			
Nimrod Shapira Bar-Or; Imri Ganiel; Jonatan Kopelev; Yakov-Yan Toumarkin	4×100 m medley relay	3:39.31	16	—		Did not advance	

Women

Athlete	Event	Heat		Semifinal		Final	
Athlete	Event	Time	Rank	Time	Rank	Time	Rank
Amit Ivry	50 m backstroke	28.75 NR	20	Did not advance			
Amit Ivry	50 m breaststroke	31.67 NR	23	Did not advance			
Amit Ivry	100 m breaststroke	1:08.52 NR	18	Did not advance			
Amit Ivry	50 m butterfly	27.04	28	Did not advance			
Amit Ivry	100 m butterfly	59.45	22	Did not advance			
