= Swimming at the 2016 European Aquatics Championships – Women's 50 metre freestyle =

Women's 50 metre freestyle at the 2016 European Aquatics Championships
- Dates: 21–22 May
- Competitors: 62 from 36 nations
- Winning time: 24.07

Medalists
gold medal	Ranomi Kromowidjojo	Netherlands
silver medal	Francesca Halsall	Great Britain
bronze medal	Jeanette Ottesen	Denmark

The Women's 50 metre freestyle competition of the 2016 European Aquatics Championships was held on 21 and 22 May 2016.

== Records ==
Prior to the competition, the existing world, European and championship records were as follows.

	Name	Nation	Time	Location	Date
World record	Britta Steffen	Germany	23.73	Rome	2 August 2009
European record	Britta Steffen	Germany	23.73	Rome	2 August 2009
Championship record	Marleen Veldhuis	Netherlands	24.09	Eindhoven	24 March 2008

== Results ==
=== Heats ===
The heats were held on 21 May at 09:35.

Rank	Heat	Lane	Name	Nationality	Time	Notes
1	7	4	Ranomi Kromowidjojo	Netherlands	24.80	Q
2	5	4	Jeanette Ottesen	Denmark	24.98	Q
3	7	5	Anna Santamans	France	25.00	Q
4	5	1	Aleksandra Urbańczyk	Poland	25.10	Q
5	6	4	Francesca Halsall	Great Britain	25.11	Q
6	6	3	Yuliya Khitraya	Belarus	25.16	Q
7	7	2	Kim Busch	Netherlands	25.33	Q
8	6	6	Erika Ferraioli	Italy	25.35	Q
8	5	5	Silvia Di Pietro	Italy	25.35	Q
8	7	3	Therese Alshammar	Sweden	25.35	Q
11	6	2	Birgit Koschischek	Austria	25.41	Q
12	5	3	Darya Stepanyuk	Ukraine	25.45	Q
13	6	7	Anna Dowgiert	Poland	25.46	Q
14	5	7	Theodora Drakou	Greece	25.49	Q
14	6	5	Tamara van Vliet	Netherlands	25.49	
16	7	6	Andrea Murez	Israel	25.52	Q
16	4	5	Susann Bjørnsen	Norway	25.52	Q
18	7	7	Mie Østergaard Nielsen	Denmark	25.55	
19	5	6	Mélanie Henique	France	25.64	
20	6	8	Julie-Marie Meynen	Luxembourg	25.69	
21	5	2	Zohar Shikler	Israel	25.70	
22	4	3	Miroslava Syllabová	Slovakia	25.78	
23	7	9	Cecilie Johannessen	Norway	25.82	
24	5	0	Mimosa Jallow	Finland	25.84	
25	6	9	Aglaia Pezzato	Italy	25.85	
26	7	1	Marrit Steenbergen	Netherlands	25.90	
26	2	6	Maria Ugolkova	Switzerland	25.90	
28	6	1	Sasha Touretski	Switzerland	25.97	
29	3	2	Nastja Govejšek	Slovenia	26.01	
30	5	8	Hanna-Maria Seppälä	Finland	26.04	
31	4	6	Harriet Cooper	Great Britain	26.05	
32	7	0	Anna Kolářová	Czech Republic	26.10	
33	6	0	Tessa Nurminen	Finland	26.14	
34	4	0	Lucy Hope	Great Britain	26.18	
35	3	5	Marte Løvberg	Norway	26.29	
35	5	9	Fatima Gallardo	Spain	26.29	
37	4	7	Nathalie Lindborg	Sweden	26.32	
38	2	3	Kristel Vourna	Greece	26.40	
39	3	3	Bryndis Hansen	Iceland	26.41	
40	3	6	İlknur Çakıcı	Turkey	26.43	
41	4	1	Nina Rangelova	Bulgaria	26.47	
42	3	1	Juliette Casini	Belgium	26.49	
42	3	8	Barbora Mišendová	Slovakia	26.49	
44	2	7	Kristīna Šteins	Latvia	26.51	
45	4	2	Gabriela Ņikitina	Latvia	26.53	
46	3	7	Jessica Jackson	Great Britain	26.59	
47	2	5	Tess Grossmann	Estonia	26.69	
48	4	8	Fanny Teijonsalo	Finland	26.71	
49	3	4	Sanja Jovanović	Croatia	26.90	
50	3	0	Danielle Hill	Ireland	26.91	
51	3	9	Svenja Stoffel	Switzerland	26.92	
52	2	4	Nichola Muscat	Malta	27.00	
53	2	2	Ema Šarar	Croatia	27.04	
54	4	9	Ana Pinho Rodrigues	Portugal	27.07	
55	2	8	Monika Vasilyan	Armenia	27.25	
56	2	1	Esra Kaçmaz	Turkey	27.30	
57	2	9	Monica Ramírez	Andorra	27.51	
58	1	5	Ana-Maria Damjanovska	Macedonia	27.58	
59	1	6	Nikol Merizaj	Albania	27.86	
60	2	0	Signhild Joensen	Faroe Islands	27.88	
61	1	3	Emina Pašukan	Bosnia and Herzegovina	28.05	
62	1	4	Nadia Tudo	Andorra	28.16	
	4	4	Magdalena Kuras	Sweden	DNS	
	7	8	Sviatlana Khakhlova	Belarus	DNS	

=== Semifinals ===
The semifinals were held on 21 May at 17:48.

==== Semifinal 1 ====
Rank	Lane	Name	Nationality	Time	Notes
1	4	Jeanette Ottesen	Denmark	24.93	Q
2	3	Yuliya Khitraya	Belarus	25.05	Q
3	1	Theodora Drakou	Greece	25.06	Q
4	2	Silvia Di Pietro	Italy	25.09	Q
5	7	Darya Stepanyuk	Ukraine	25.19	
6	6	Erika Ferraioli	Italy	25.21	
7	8	Susann Bjørnsen	Norway	25.22	
8	5	Aleksandra Urbańczyk	Poland	25.27	

==== Semifinal 2 ====
Rank	Lane	Name	Nationality	Time	Notes
1	3	Francesca Halsall	Great Britain	24.21	Q
2	4	Ranomi Kromowidjojo	Netherlands	24.37	Q
3	5	Anna Santamans	France	24.83	Q
4	2	Therese Alshammar	Sweden	25.05	Q
5	6	Kim Busch	Netherlands	25.18	
6	1	Anna Dowgiert	Poland	25.41	
7	8	Andrea Murez	Israel	25.56	
8	7	Birgit Koschischek	Austria	25.63	

=== Final ===
The final was held on 22 May at 16:02.

Rank	Lane	Name	Nationality	Time	Notes
1st place, gold medalist(s)	5	Ranomi Kromowidjojo	Netherlands	24.07	CR
2nd place, silver medalist(s)	4	Francesca Halsall	Great Britain	24.44	
3rd place, bronze medalist(s)	6	Jeanette Ottesen	Denmark	24.61	
4	3	Anna Santamans	France	24.81	
5	1	Theodora Drakou	Greece	25.04	
6	8	Silvia Di Pietro	Italy	25.08	
7	7	Therese Alshammar	Sweden	25.12	
8	2	Yuliya Khitraya	Belarus	25.15	
