= Zohar Shikler =

Israeli swimmer

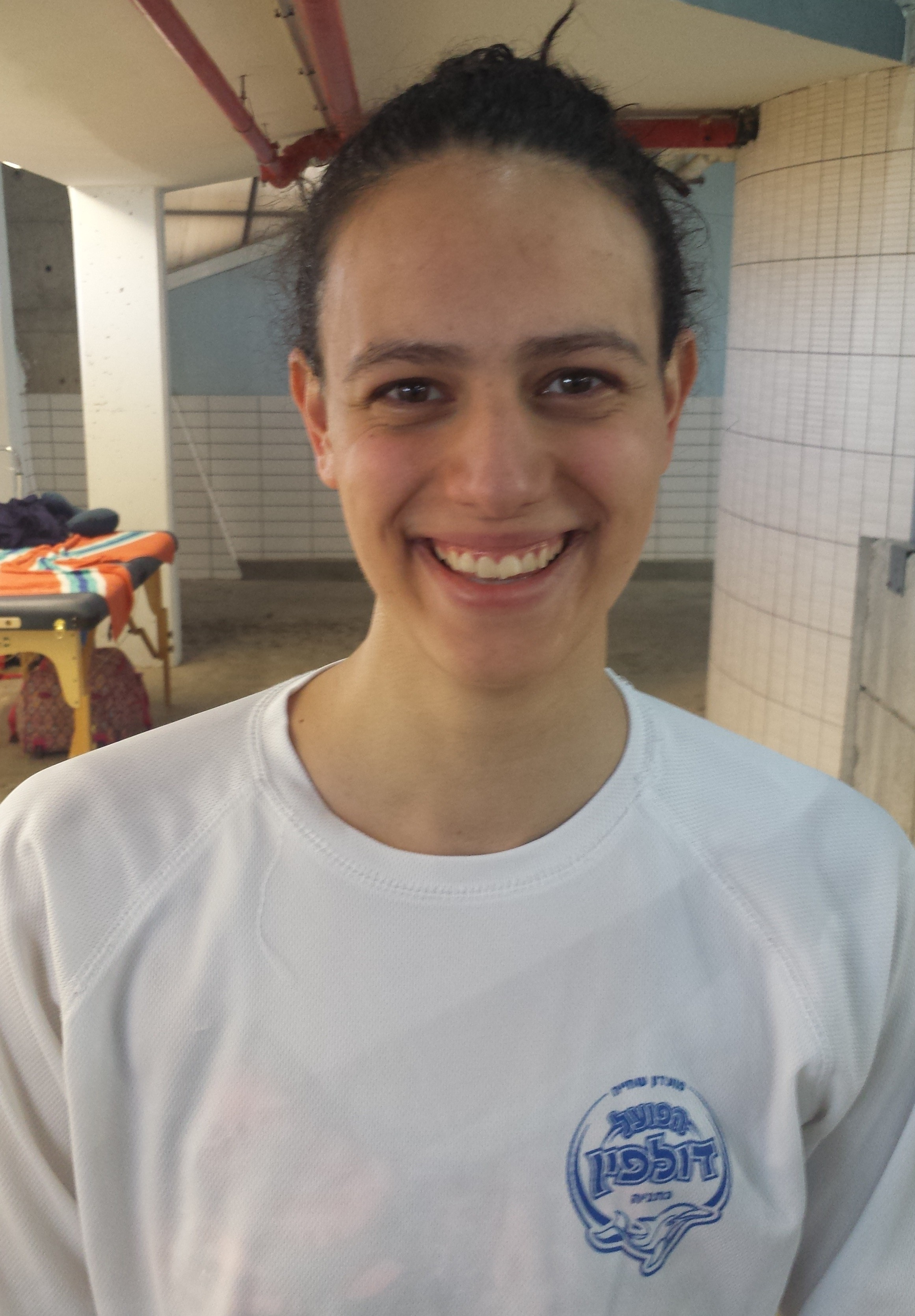
- Zohar Shikler in April 2016

Personal information
- Full name: Zohar Hen Shikler
- Nationality: Israel
- Born: זוהר שיקלר; July 8, 1997 (age 29)
- Height: 1.78 m (5 ft 10 in)
- Weight: 61 kg (134 lb)

Sport
- Sport: Swimming
- Strokes: 50 m freestyle 100 m freestyle
- Club: Hapoel Dolphin Netanya

Zohar Hen Shikler (Hebrew: זוהר חן שיקלר; born 8 July 1997), is an Israeli Olympic swimmer, and an Israeli national record holder.

== Swimming career ==
Shikler started to swim at the age of six. She first competed with the Maccabi Kiryat Ono Swimming Team, and then moved to Hapoel Dolphin Netanya.

In 2013, Shikler took 12th place in the 50 m freestyle at the European Youth Championships. Representing Israel at the 2013 Maccabiah Games in July 2013, she swam the 50 m freestyle in 26.23, setting both the Maccabiah record for women and the competition's record for girls ages 13–16.

In August 2014, at the Israeli National Championships Shikler won the 100 m freestyle in 57.34.

Shikler took part in the 2015 World Aquatics Championships in Kazan, Russia, placing 47th in the 50 m freestyle (26.19) and 43rd in the 100 m freestyle (56.84), in early August 2015. A week later, she participated in the Israeli National Championships, winning the 50 m freestyle with a time of 25.30, only 2 hundredths of a second short of the qualifying time for the 2016 Olympic Games. Her time was also close to the Israeli national record of 25.23, set by Anna Gostomelsky when she represented Israel at the 2008 Olympics.

In December 2015, Shikler set an Israeli national record in the 50 m freestyle, at 24.80, while swimming in the women's 4 x 50 m freestyle team at the European Short Course Swimming Championships at the Wingate Institute.

In April 2016, she won the Israeli Swimming Association Cup with a time of 25.18. Thanks to this time, Shikler qualified to participate for Israel at the 2016 Summer Olympics. That same month, at the Israeli Championships in a 50 m-long (160 ft) pool at Wingate Institute she set personal records in the 50 m freestyle (25.18) and the 100 m freestyle (56.1).

Shikler also took part in the 2016 European Aquatics Championships in May 2016 in London, placing 21st in the 50 m freestyle (25.70) and 56th in the 100 m freestyle (56.91).

=== Olympics ===
Shikler competed for Israel at the 2016 Olympics. She and her teammates on the women's 4 × 100 m freestyle relay team (Keren Siebner, Amit Ivry, and Andrea Murez) finished 16th in 3:41.97, with her 55.29 being the fastest time among the four. She is slated to swim in Heat 8 of the women's 50 m freestyle on August 10.

== See also ==
- List of Israeli records in swimming
