= Tom Be'eri =

Israeli swimmer

Tom Beeri תום בארי
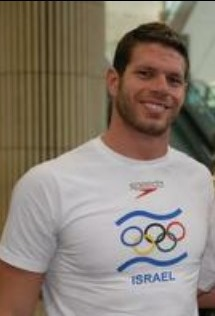
- Tom Be'eri in 2016.

Personal information
- Full name: Tom Beeri
- Nationality: Israeli
- Born: 17 May 1986 (age 40) Yagur, Israel

Sport
- Sport: Swimming
- Club: Maccabi Kiryat Ono
- College team: University of Georgia
Medal record
Maccabiah Games
Gold medal – first place	2009 Israel	200m breaststroke
Silver medal – second place	2009 Israel	4x100m medley relay

Tom Beeri (Hebrew: תום בארי; born 17 May 1986 in Yagur) is an Israeli swimmer who represented Israel at the 2008 Summer Olympics.

== Biography ==
Be'eri was born and raised in Kibbutz Yagur, Israel. He won multiple Israeli National Champion titles in the 100 meter Breaststroke and the 200 meter Breaststroke. Upon completing mandatory military service, he set an Israeli national record and qualified for the 2008 Summer Olympic Games in Beijing, China. He also served as the Israeli Olympic swim team captain and set two Israeli national records at the Games.

After the Olympic Games, Be’eri was recruited by many of the top collegiate swimming programs in the U.S. before becoming a student-athlete at the University of Georgia in 2009. As a collegiate swimmer, he represented the UGA swimming and diving team at SEC championships and at the NCAA national championships. As a student he earned and was recognized for four Athletic Director's academic awards as well as four SEC academic awards. In 2013, Be'eri graduated with a dual degree in International Affairs-Political Economy and Business Administration.

He competed on behalf of Israel at the 2008 Summer Olympics in Beijing, China. He is Jewish.

== See also ==
- List of Israeli records in swimming
