= Keren Siebner =

Israeli swimmer (born 1990)

Keren Siebner קרן זיבנר
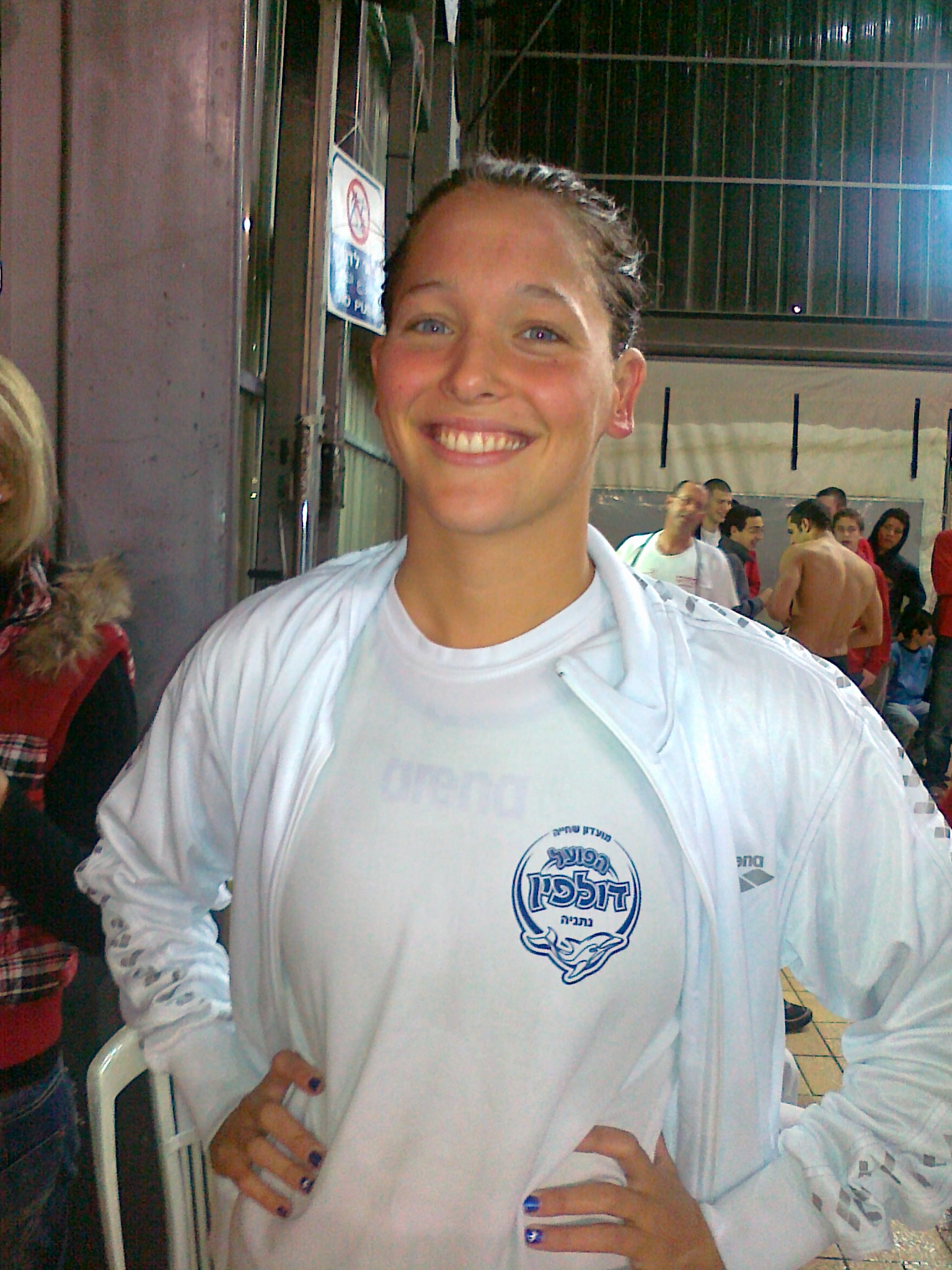

Personal information
- Full name: Keren Michaela Siebner
- Nationality: Israel
- Born: June 9, 1990 (age 36) Kfar Saba
- Height: 180 cm (5 ft 11 in)
- Weight: 68 kg (150 lb)

Sport
- Sport: Swimming
- Strokes: Freestyle, backstroke, butterfly
- Club: Hapoel Dolphin Netanya
- College team: Georgia Institute of Technology
Medal record
Women's swimming
Representing Israel
Maccabiah Games
| Gold medal – first place | 2009 Israel | 4×200 m freestyle |
| Gold medal – first place | 2009 Israel | 4×100 m medley |
| Gold medal – first place | 2013 Israel | 100 m butterfly |
| Gold medal – first place | 2013 Israel | 4×100 m freestyle |
| Gold medal – first place | 2017 Israel | 200 m butterfly |
| Silver medal – second place | 2017 Israel | 100 m butterfly |
| Silver medal – second place | 2017 Israel | 4×100 m medley relay |
| Bronze medal – third place | 2009 Israel | 50 m freestyle |
| Bronze medal – third place | 2013 Israel | 50 m freestyle |

Keren Michaela Siebner (Hebrew: קרן זיבנר; also Zibner, born 1990), is an Israeli Olympic swimmer, Israeli national champion, Maccabiah Games winner, and a national record holder in the 200m butterfly and 200m backstroke.

== Early and personal life ==
Siebner was born in Kfar Saba, Israel, to Miron and Osnat Siebner, and grew up in Herzliya. She has an older sister, Sivan. She attended Hayovel High School.

She attended the Georgia Institute of Technology, where Siebner studied industrial and systems engineering, despite having severe ADHD. She is also an industrial and management engineer and a model.

== Swimming career ==
In high school Siebner swam for four years for the school, and set Israeli junior records in the 50m freestyle, the 200m free, and the 200m backstroke.

In college, she swam for the Georgia Tech Yellow Jackets, and was named to the 2008–09, 2009–10, 2010–11, and 2011-12 Atlantic Coast Conference Academic Honor Roll. Siebner set university records in the 100m fly (54.48), 200m free relay (1:32.95), 400m free relay (3:20.64), 800m free relay (7:18.42), and the 400m medley relay (3:42.02). She is also 3rd all-time at the university in the 100m freestyle (50.27).

At the 2013 Maccabiah Games, she won two gold medals swimming for Israel, in the 100m butterfly and the 400m freestyle relay team, which set a new Israeli record. Siebner had won 8 medals at the Maccabiah Games as of 2013, 5 of them gold. Her club is Hapoel Dolphin Netanya.

She participated in the 2014 European Aquatics Championships, placing 16th in the 200 m butterfly with a new Israeli record. In 2015, Siebner took part in the 2015 European Short Course Swimming Championships held in Netanya, Israel, finishing 12th in the 200 m butterfly, 18th in the 100 m butterfly, 12th in the 4×50 m medley, and 6th in the 4×50 m freestyle with a new Israeli record. She also participated in 50 and 100 m freestyle, 100 m backstroke, and 50 m butterfly.

In December 2015, she set a new Israeli national record of 2:10.05 in the 200m butterfly, replacing the prior national record which she had also set.

In May 2016, Siebner won eight gold medals at the Israel National Championships. That same month, at the Belgian Open Championships she won the 200m butterfly in a time of 2:11.36.

In June 2016, she participated in the 2016 European Aquatics Championships, finishing 16th in the 200 m butterfly with the current Israeli record, 2:11.04. Siebner also placed 18th in the 100 m butterfly, 23rd in the 50 m butterfly, and 39th in the 100 m freestyle. A few weeks later, in July she broke the Israeli record in 200 m backstroke during the national championships, with a time of 2:13.10, as she won six gold medals at the nationals.

Siebner missed swimming as an individual at the 2016 Summer Olympics by 0.01 seconds, but she still represented Israel at the 2016 Summer Olympics by competing in the 4 × 100 m freestyle relay with Andrea Murez, Amit Ivry, and Zohar Shikler.

Her long course (50m pool) personal bests as of the end of 2016 were 50m butterfly—0:26.92 (April 2016), 100m butterfly—0:59.10 (May 2016), 100m freestyle—0:55.42 (April 2016), and 200m butterfly—2:11.04 (May 2016).

Siebner swam for Team Israel at the 2017 Maccabiah Games, and won a gold medal in the 200m butterfly with a time of 2:16.57, and a silver medal in the 100m butterfly with a time of 1:00.01. Siebner, Amit Ivry, Shahar Menahem, and Or Tamir set an Israeli national record in the women's 4 × 100 m medley relay with a time of 4:11.67 as they won a silver medal.

== See also ==
- List of Israeli records in swimming
