= Eden Girloanta =

Israeli swimmer

Personal information
- Native name: עדן גירלונטה
- Born: 22 October 2000 (age 25)

Sport
- Sport: Swimming

Eden Girloanta (Hebrew: עדן גירלונטה; born 22 October 2000) is an Israeli swimmer. She represented Israel at the 2017 World Aquatics Championships in Budapest, Hungary and at the 2019 World Aquatics Championships in Gwangju, South Korea. In 2019, she competed in the women's 10 km event and she finished in 38th place. She also competed in the women's 5 km event and finished in 35th place.
