= Itay Goldfaden =

Israeli swimmer (born 1996)

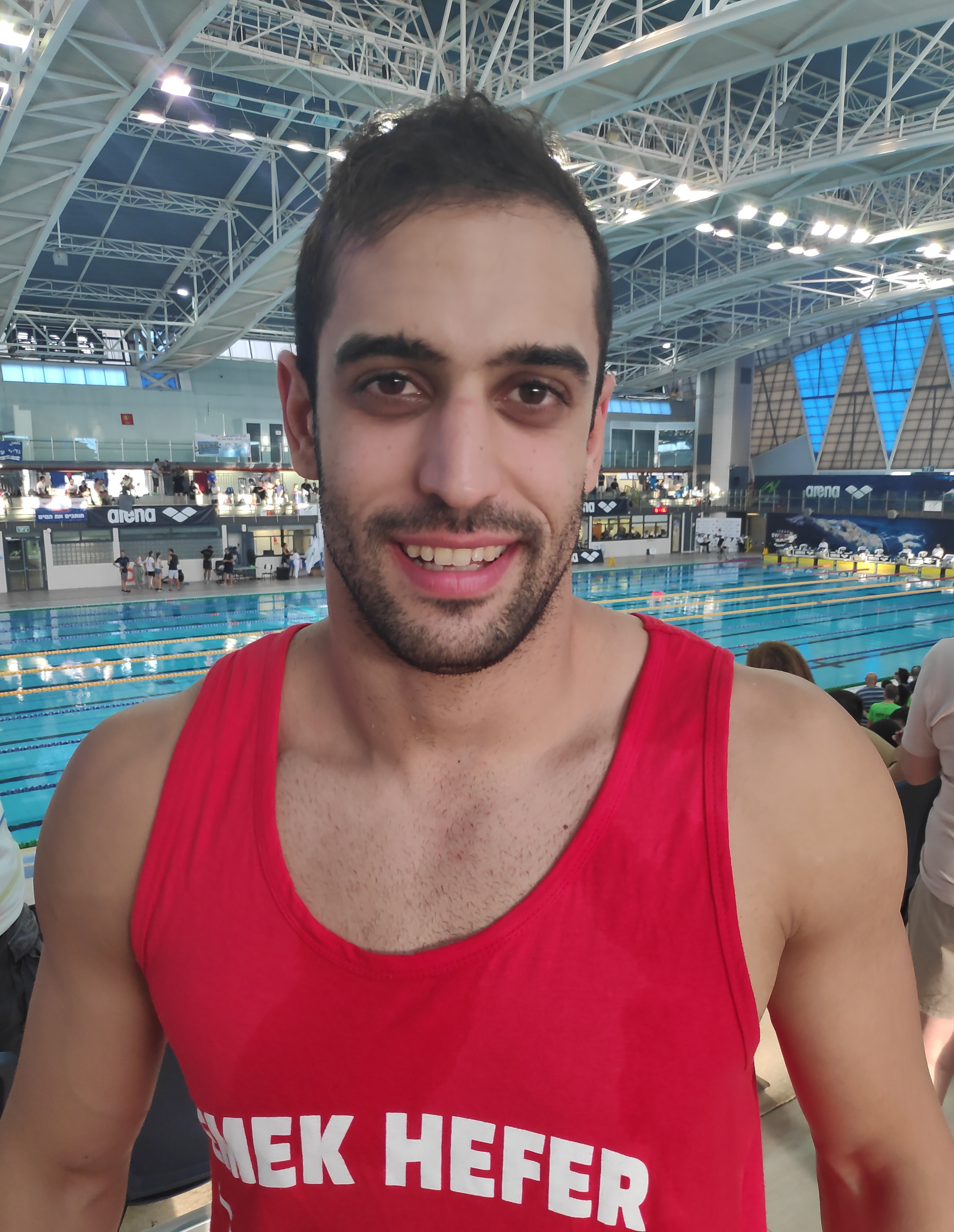
- Goldfaden in 2019

Personal information
- Native name: איתי גולדפדן
- Nationality: Israel
- Born: 24 April 1996 (age 30)

Sport
- Sport: Swimming
- College team: South Carolina

Itay Goldfaden (Hebrew: איתי גולדפדן; born 24 April 1996) is an Israeli swimmer.

== Career ==
He represented Israel at the 2020 Summer Olympics. The swimmer made his way to the finals of the mixed 4×100 meter medley relay race at the Tokyo Games.

=== Career highlights ===
| Event | Time | Medal | Competition | Comp Country | Date |
|---|---|---|---|---|---|
| Men's 100 Breaststroke | 01:00.79 | Gold | Israel National Summer Trial and Championships | Israel | 13/06/2021 |

== Personal life ==
Goldfaden attended the University of South Carolina.

== See also ==
- List of Israeli records in swimming
