= Ron Polonsky =

Israeli swimmer (born 2001)

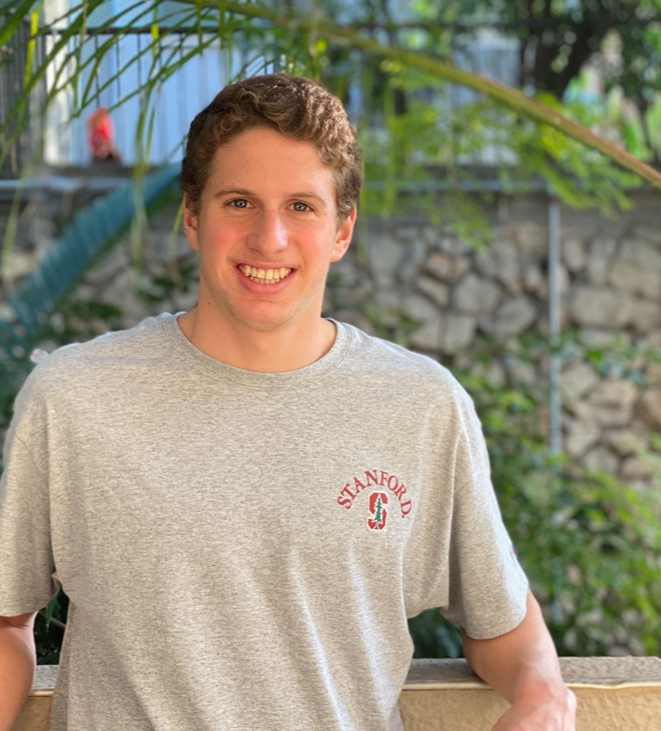
- Polonsky in 2020

Personal information
- Native name: רון פולונסקי
- Nationality: Israel
- Born: 28 March 2001 (age 25) Haifa, Israel
- Height: 1.87 m (6 ft 2 in)

Sport
- Sport: Swimming
- College team: Stanford University
- Club: Maccabi Haifa
Medal record
Men's swimming
Representing Israel
European Championships (LC)
Gold medal – first place	2024 Belgrade	4×100m mixed medley
Silver medal – second place	2024 Belgrade	200m IM
European U-23 Swimming Championships
Silver medal – second place	2023 Dublin	200m IM
European Junior Championships
Silver medal – second place	2019 Kazan	200m IM

Ron Polonsky (Hebrew: רון פולונסקי; born 28 March 2001) is an Israeli Olympic swimmer. He won silver medals in the 2019 European Junior Championships and the 2023 European U-23 Championships, as well as the gold medal in the 2024 European Aquatics Championships, in the 200m IM. He also competed in the 2020 Tokyo Olympics, and won the silver medal in the 2024 NCAA Division I Championships in the 100 Y Breast. Polonsky represented Israel at the 2024 Paris Olympics in the 200 metre individual medley and the Mixed 4×100 metre medley relay.

== Early and personal life ==
Polonsky was born and raised in Haifa, Israel, and is Jewish. His parents, Anna and Oleg, are computer science engineers. He was a ballroom dancer and practiced judo as a young child. His sister Lea Polonsky, 14 months his junior, is a competitive swimmer as well, and they have two younger siblings.

== Swimming career ==
His primary strokes are the breaststroke and the individual medley. Polonsky's club is Maccabi Haifa

=== 2019 ===
In March 2019 at the FFN Golden Tour - 8th Mediterranean Open in Marseille, France, at 17 years of age Polonsky won silver medals in the 200 L IM in 2:03.28, and in the 100 L Breast in 1:05.06. In April 2019 at the ATUS Trophy 2019 in Graz, Austria, he won a gold medal in the 200m Medley (1:59.67). In June 2019 at the Israel Trials he won the silver medal in the 200m Breaststroke (2:19.85). In July 2019 at the 2019 European Junior Championships, he won a silver medal in Kazan, Russia, in the 200 L IM in a time of 1:59.98. In August 2019 at the 7th FINA World Junior Championship in Budapest, Hungary, he came in fourth in the 200 L IM (1:59.84). That same month at the Israel Summer National Championships (50m) he won gold medals in the 200m Breaststroke (2:16.15), 200m Medley (2:00.16), and Mixed 4 × 100 m Medley Relay (3:57.19), silver medals in the 400m Medley (4:24.60), Men 4 × 100 m Medley Relay 3:45.38), and Men 4 × 200 m Freestyle Relay (7:33.05), and a bronze medal in the Men 4 × 100 m Freestyle Relay (3:25.28).

In November 2019 at the Millenium Cup in Israel, he won gold medals in the 200m Medley (2:00.78) and the 400m Medley (4:15.71). In December 2019 at the Swim Cup Amsterdam in the Netherlands, Polonsky won the silver medal in the 200 L IM in a time of 1:59.45. That same month at the Israel National Winter Championships (25m) he won gold medals in the 100m Medley (54.11) and the Men 400m Medley (4:09.67), and silver medals in the 400m Freestyle (3:47.23), Men 4x50m Medley Relay (1:38.19), and Mixed 4x50m Medley Relay (1:44.7).

=== 2020 ===
In December 2020 at the 2020 Rotterdam Qualification Meet in the Netherlands at 19 years old Polonsky won the gold medal in the 200 L IM in a time of 1:59.67. That same month at the Israel National Winter Trials, he won a gold medal in the 200m Medley in a time of 1:59.78.

=== 2020 Tokyo Olympics (in 2021) ===
Polonsky competed in the 2020 Summer Olympics in Tokyo, Japan, in 2021. There, he came in 26th in the 200m individual medley, 27th in the 200m breaststroke, and 27th in the 400m individual medley.

=== 2021–23 ===
In April 2021 at the Malmsten Swim Open Stockholm in Sweden, Polonsky won a silver medal in the Men 4 × 100 m Freestyle Relay in a time of 3:20.28, and a bronze medal in the 400 L IM in a time of 4:21.83. In May 2021 at the Mare Nostrum - 38th Meeting International de Natation de Monte Carlo, he won a silver medal in the 400m Medley (4:19.00). In June 2021 at the Israel National Summer Trial and Championships, he won gold medals in the 200m Breaststroke (2:12.49), 200m Medley (1:59.97), and 400m Medley (4:20.65). In December 2021 at the Israel National Championships (25m) he won gold medals in the 50m Breaststroke in a time of 26.97 and the 200m Backstroke in a time of 1:53.76, as well as a silver medal in the Men 4x50m Freestyle Relay in a time of 1:30.20.

Polonsky is a computer science student at Stanford University. He swims for the Stanford swim team.

As a freshman in 2021–22, Polonsky was a six-time All-American, two-time Pac-12 Champion (200 medley relay - 1:22.74; 400 medley relay - 3:01.45), and a College Swimming and Diving Coaches Association of America (CSCAA) Scholar All-American. At the Pac-12 Championships, he won a silver medal in the 800 free relay (6:08.73), and bronze medals in the 200 IM (1:40.71) and 400 free relay (2:47.17). He set Stanford records in the 400 free relay (2:47.17), 800 free relay (6:06.83), 200 medley relay (1:22.41), 400 medley relay (3:01.45).

As a sophomore in 2022–23, he was again a six-time All-American, and was College Sports Communicators Academic All-American First Team, Pac-12 Academic Honor Roll, and a CSCAA Scholar All-American. Polonsky set the Stanford record in the 100 breast at the NCAA Championships (51.41), and at the Pac-12 Championships won bronze medals in the 800 free relay (6:11.08), 200 IM (1:40.42), and 400 medley relay (3:02.71).

Polonsky is also second in Stanford history in the 200 IM (1:39.96) and the 400 IM (3:39.49), and fourth in the 200 breast (1:51.73).

In June 2023 at the Internazionali di Nuoto - 59 Sette Colli in Rome, Italy, Polonsky won the bronze medal in the 200 L IM in a time of 2:00.04. In August 2023 at the 2023 European U-23 Swimming Championships in Dublin, Ireland, he won the silver medal in the 200 L IM in a time of 1:58.07. That same month at the Israel Adults Championships - Criteria Competition he won a silver medal in the 200m breaststroke with a time of 2:14.30, and a bronze medal in the 50m breaststroke with a time of 28.47.

=== 2024–present ===
In March 2024 at the NCAA Division I Mens Championships in Indianapolis, Indiana, Polonsky won the silver medal in the 100 Y Breast in 50.87. That same month at the Pacific 12 Championships in Federal Way, Washington, he won the silver medal in the 100 Y Breast in a time of 51.17.

In June 2024 at the 2024 European Aquatics Championships in Belgrade, Serbia, he won the silver medal in the 200 L IM in a time of 1:57.36 (after setting an Israeli record in the semi-final with a time of 1:57.01). That same month at the Israel Olympic Trials, Polonsky won a gold medal in the 200m Medley with a time of 1:58.79.

=== 2024 Paris Olympics ===
Polonsky represented Israel at the 2024 Paris Olympics in the 200 metre individual medley and the Mixed 4×100 metre medley relay.

== See also ==
- List of Israeli records in swimming
- List of European Aquatics Championships medalists in swimming (men)
- List of European Aquatics Championships medalists in swimming (mixed)
