= Daniel Namir =

Israeli swimmer (born 1997)

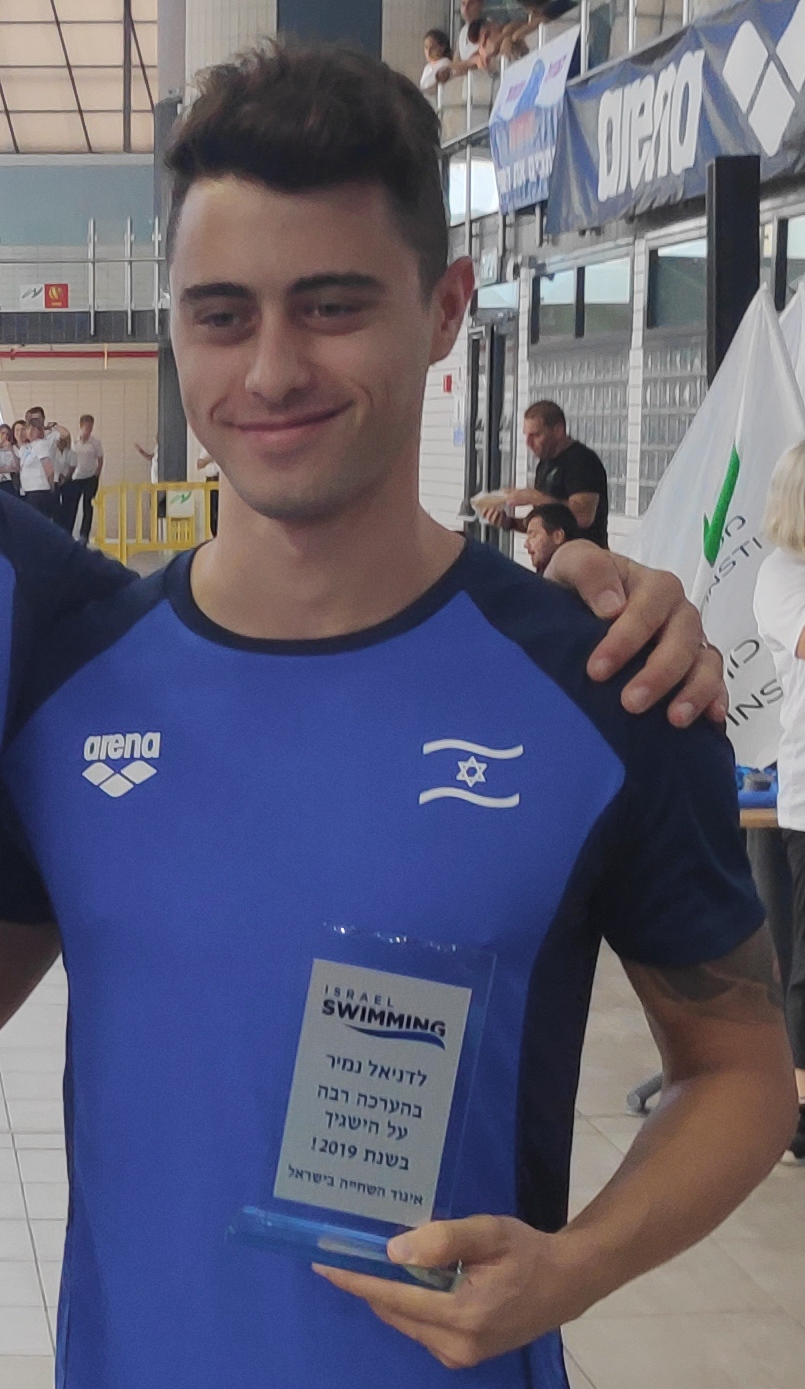

Personal information
- Native name: דניאל נמיר
- Nationality: Israeli
- Born: 12 August 1997 (age 28) Netanya, Israel

Sport
- Sport: Swimming

Daniel Namir (Hebrew: דניאל נמיר; born 12 August 1997) is an Israeli swimmer. He competed in the men's 4 × 200 metre freestyle relay at the 2020 Summer Olympics.

== See also ==
- List of Israeli records in swimming
