= Meiron Cheruti =

Israeli swimmer (born 1997)

Meiron Cheruti מירון חרותי
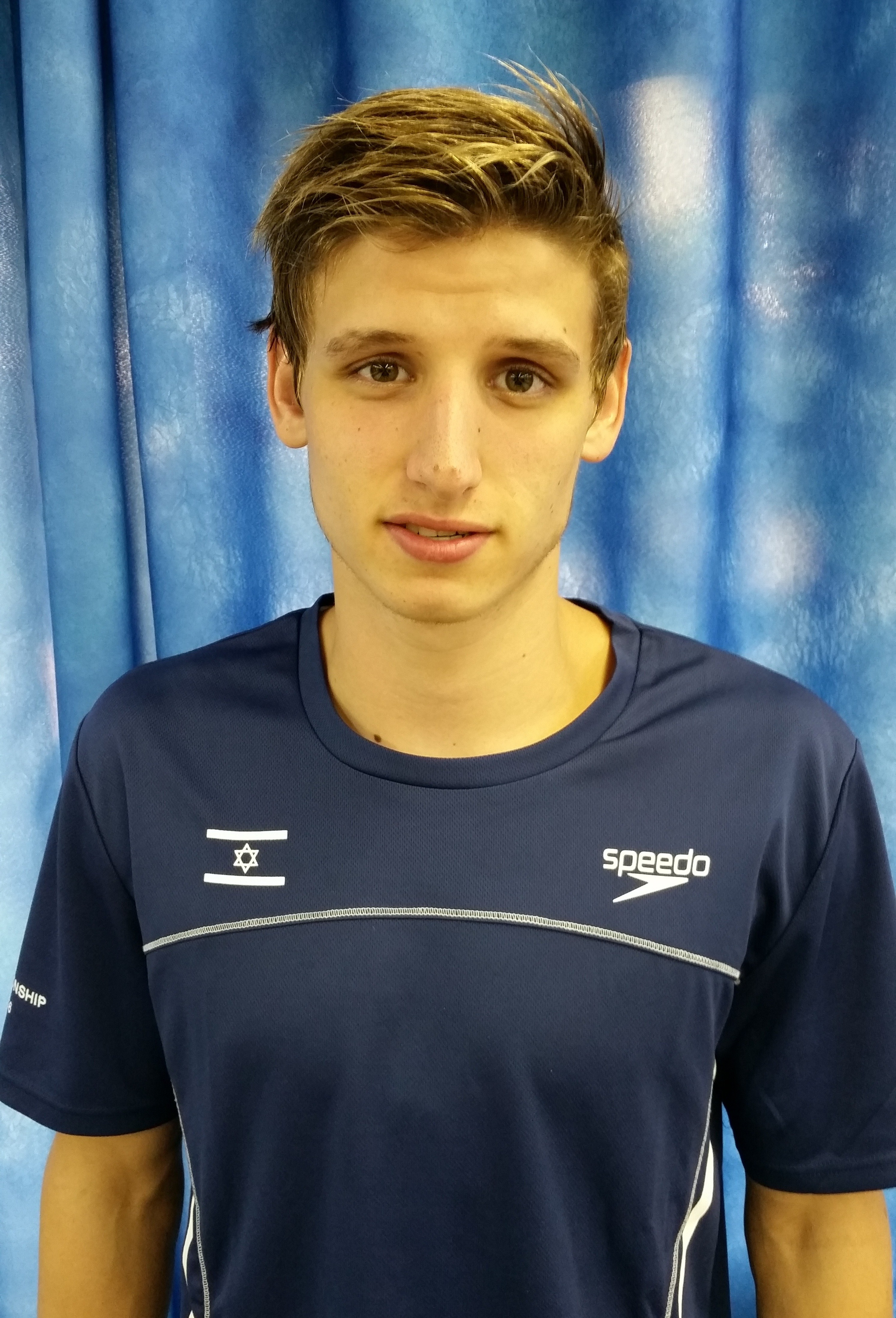
- Meiron Cheruti in 2016

Personal information
- Full name: Meiron Amir Cheruti
- Nationality: Israeli
- Born: 19 October 1997 (age 29)
- Height: 1.88 m (6 ft 2 in)
- Weight: 80 kg (176 lb)

Sport
- Sport: Swimming
- Strokes: freestyle and butterfly
- Club: Maccabi Haifa
- Coach: Jonatan Kopelev

Meiron Amir Cheruti (Hebrew: מירון חרותי; born 19 October 1997) is an Israeli swimmer. He competes in 100m freestyle, 50m butterfly, 50m freestyle, 4 × 100 m freestyle, and 4x50m freestyle. He qualified to represent Israel at the 2020 Summer Olympics. Cheruti represented Israel at the 2024 Paris Olympics in swimming in the Men's 50 metre freestyle.

== Swimming career ==
Cheruti started swimming at the age of five, and his club is Maccabi Haifa and he has also trained at CN Marseille. His coach is Jonatan Kopelev. He competes in 100m freestyle, 50m butterfly, 50m freestyle, 4 × 100 m freestyle, and 4x50m freestyle. He is a member of Project Rising Star, a program that coach David Marsh created with the Israel Swimming Association.

=== 2016–19 ===
In July 2016 at the Scottish National Championships (50m), Cheruti won the gold medal in the 50m butterfly (fly) with a time of 23.80. That same month Cheruti won a silver medal at the Lausanne Swim Cup in the 50m freestyle (free) with a time of 21.62.

In April 2019, at the Israel Cup, at 21 years old Cheruti won the 50m free in 21.27. That same month at the Stockholm Open, Cheruti won a silver medal in the 50m free in 22.23. In May 2019 he won a silver medal in the 2019 Speedo Grand Challenge in the 50m free in 22.69 in Irvine, California. In June 2019 at the Sette Colli Trophy he set a new Israeli national record in the 50m fly, at 23.65. In July 2019 he competed in the men's 50m fly at the 2019 World Aquatics Championships in Gwangju, South Korea. In August 2019 at the Israel Summer National Championships (50m) he won a gold medal in the 100m free with a time of 49.00, and a gold medal in the mixed 4x100 medley relay with a time of 3:57.19. In December 2019 at the European Swimming Championships (25m) 2019 he set a personal record in the 50m backstroke with a time of 24.46, and set a national record in the men 4x50 free relay with a time of 1:26.90. That same month at the 2019 Israeli Short Course Winter Championships in Netanya, he set new national records in the men's 50m free in 21.08, 100m free in 47.08, and 50m fly in 22.86. Also in December 2019, he won the gold medal in the 50m free in Swimcup Amsterdam in the Netherlands in 22.08.

=== 2020–21 ===
In December 2020 at the Rotterdam Qualification Meet 2020 in the Netherlands he won a silver medal in the 50m fly with a time of 23.93, and a silver medal in the 50m free with a time of 22.11.

In April 2021 at the 2021 Swim Open Stockholm in Sweden, Cheruti won the silver medal in the 50m fly, at 23.62, and the bronze medal in the 50m free at 22.37. In May 2021 he won the gold medal in the Mare Nostrum - 38th Meeting International de Natation de Monte Carlo 2021 in the 50m fly with a time of 23.43. In June 2021 he won the gold medal in the men's 50m free in 21.96, the gold medal in the 50m fly in 23.75, and the gold medal in the 100m free in 49.23 at the Israel National Championships + Olympic Trials.

=== 2020 Olympic Games (in 2021) ===
Cheruti represented Israel at the 2020 Summer Olympics in swimming. He came in 17th out of 73 swimmers in the men's 50m freestyle, and came in 29th out of 71 swimmers in the men's 100m freestyle.

=== 2022 ===
In March 2022 at the Emek Hefer Championships, Cheruti won a gold medal in the 50m free with a time of 22.55. In April 2022 at the Malmsten Swim Open Stockholm he won a gold medal in the 50m free with a time of 22.24. In May 2022 at the Israel Swimming Cup he won a gold medal in the 50m free with a time of 21.95, and bronze medals in the 100m free with a time of 49.80 and in the 50m backstroke with a time of 25.44. In July 2022 at the 2022 Maccabiah Games in Israel he won the gold medal in the 50m fly, with a time of 22.47.

=== 2023–24 ===
In February 2023 at the Lausanne Swim Cup he won the gold medal in the 50m free with a time of 22.18, and a bronze medal in the 50m fly with a time of 23.69. In April 2023 at the 2023 Israel Swimming Cup, Cheruti won a gold medal in the 50m free in a new Israeli record of 21.84 that qualified him for the Paris Olympics, and a gold medal in the 50m fly with a time of 23.49. In June 2023 at the Israeli Championships he won the gold medal in the 50m fly with a time of 22.15, a gold medal in the 50m free with a time of 22.15, and a gold medal in the 50m backstroke in a time of 25.27. That same month at the Israel Adults Championships - Criteria Competition he won a gold medal in the 50m back with a time of 25.27, a gold medal in the 50m free with a time of 22.15, and a silver medal in the 50m fly with a time of 23.51.

In March 2024 at the 2024 Meeting Nice – Camille Muffat, part of the French Giant Series, Cheruti won the bronze medal in the 50m fly with a time of 23.50. The same month at the Giant Open Series in Saint-Germain-En-Laye, France, he won the silver medal in the 50m fly with a time of 23.29. In April 2024 at the Eindhoven Qualification Meet 2024 in the Netherlands, he won a gold medal in the 50m fly with an Israeli record time of 23.01, and won a gold medal in the 50m free with a time of 21.93.

=== 2024 Olympic Games ===
Cheruti represented Israel at the 2024 Paris Olympics in swimming in the Men's 50 metre freestyle.

== See also ==
- List of Israeli records in swimming
