= Eden Blecher =

Israeli artistic swimmer

Personal information
- Native name: עדן בלכר
- Nationality: Israeli
- Born: 27 November 1997 (age 27)

Sport
- Sport: Artistic swimming

Eden Blecher (Hebrew: עדן בלכר; born 27 November 1997) is an Israeli swimmer.

== 2020 Tokyo Summer Olympics ==
Blecher represented Israel in the 2020 Tokyo Summer Olympics Women's duet artistic swimming, alongside Shelly Brobitsky where they finished in 15th position and did not advance to the finals.

== Career highlights ==
Event	Points	Medal	Age*	Competition	Comp Country	Date
Women Duet	141.6967	-	16	FINA World Junior Synchronised Swimming Championship 2014	Finland	30/07/2014
Women Duet Technical	80.3788	-	21	18th FINA World Championships 2019	Korea	12/07/2019
Women Duet Free	82.5333	-	22	FINA Artistic Swimming World Series 2020	France	06/03/2020
Women Team Technical	82.5039	-	21	18th FINA World Championships 2019	Korea	16/07/2019
Women Team Free	84.5333	Bronze	22	FINA Artistic Swimming World Series 2020	France	08/03/2020
Women Team Free Combination	84.7667	Gold	21	FINA Artistic Swimming World Series 2019	Greece	07/04/2019
Women Team Highlight	83.7000	-	21	18th FINA World Championships 2019	Korea	15/07/2019
