= Matan Roditi =

Israeli swimmer (born 1998)

Matan Roditi מתן רודיטי
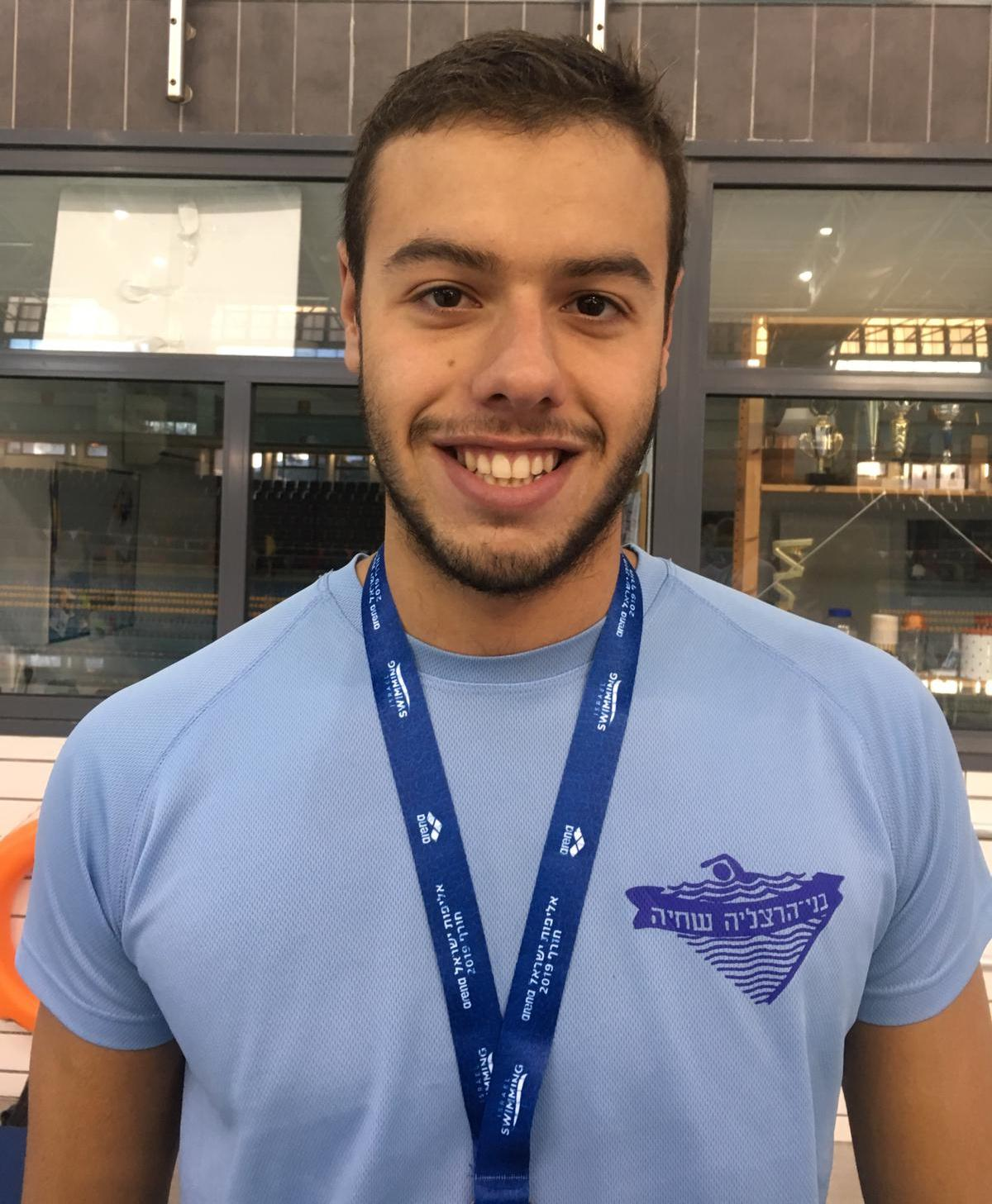
- Roditi in 2019

Personal information
- Full name: Matan Roditi
- Nationality: Israeli
- Born: 6 October 1998 (age 28) Herzliya, Israel
- Education: Reichman University

Sport
- Country: Israel
- Sport: Swimming
- Event: 10 kilometre marathon
- Club: Bnei Herzliya
- Coached by: Amir Ofer

Achievements and titles
- Olympic finals: 4th (2021)

Matan Roditi (Hebrew: מתן רודיטי; born 6 October 1998) is an Israeli Olympic marathon swimmer. His 4th place at the 2020 Summer Olympics is the closest Israel has come to an Olympic medal in swimming. He has set Israeli national records in the 800 metre freestyle and the 1500 metre freestyle, and the 10 kilometre marathon. He represented Israel at the 2024 Paris Olympics in swimming in the Men's marathon 10 kilometre, and came in 16th.

== Early life ==
Roditi is from Herzliya, Israel. His father Shmuel (Shmulik) Roditi was a soccer player who competed as a defender for the Ramat Gan team Hakoah Maccabi Amidar Ramat Gan which won two state cups and the championship title in the late 1960s and early 1970s. His mother Mazal works in a bank. His father said that their eldest son, Yossi, was killed in a car accident, and "There was no point in life, and then we decided to bring [Matan] into the world." When Matan was born, his mother was 50 years old and his father was 54 years old.

Roditi studied at Ben Gurion Middle School, and then graduated from Yuval High School, both in Herzliya. He majored in computers. He studies computer science at Reichman University (formerly known as IDC Herzliya).

== Career ==
As a four-year-old boy, Roditi was afraid to put his head in the water. A year later, he told his father that he wanted to learn to swim. He quickly forgot about his fears and fell in love with swimming, focusing initially on the backstroke and butterfly. From the age of 7 he swam at the Bnei Herzliya swimming club. Starting at age 10, he won medals in the Israeli championships. At the age of 12, he started rowing, specializing in the 400 meters.

Roditi competes with Bnei Herzliya. His coach for four years was Hanan Gilad who ultimately retired, and is now Amir Ofer. He swims 70-80 kilometers per week.

=== 2019–21 ===
In 2019, at 20 years of age, Roditi won gold medals in the Men's 1500 metre freestyle in the Israel Swimming Cup in 15:35.46, in the Men's 800 metre freestyle in the Israel Summer National Championships (50m) in 8:04.48, and in the Men's 1500 metre freestyle in the Israel Summer National Championships (50m) in 15:22.49. He also won the gold medal in the 2019 South African Open Water Championships 10k in Jeffrey’s Bay, with a time of 1:52.40.24. In 2019 he also set a new Israeli record in the long course 1500 metre by swimming it in 15:17.9, cutting .33 seconds off the old Israeli record set in 2002. At the end of the year he was the Israeli champion in the 800 free, the 1500 free, and the 10 km open water swim.

In March 2020 he won the bronze medal in the 10k in the LEN Open Water Swimming Cup (Eilat) in Israel in 1:52:19 (as the gold medal winner Kirill Abrosimov of Russia had a time of 1:52:09). Roditi also came in fourth in the 2020 Australian Open Water Swimming Championships 10 km race in South Australia's Brighton Beach with a time of 1:55:49.96—within a half-second of Australian bronze medalist Nicholas Sloman (as the gold medal winner Dutch swimmer Ferry Weertman had a time of 1:55:45.24).

In March 2021, Roditi won the gold medal in the Men's 400 metre freestyle in the Wingate League for Adults in Israel in 3:59.07. In June 2021, he came in 4th out of 63 swimmers in the 10k in the Olympic Games Qualification Tournament in Setubal, Portugal, in 2:02:15 (as the gold medal winner Hector Pardoe of Great Britain had a time of 2:02:07).

=== 2020 Olympic Games ===
Roditi represented Israel at the 2020 Summer Olympics in the 10km swim marathon in August 2021, in Tokyo Bay, in warm-water, warm-weather conditions (the temperature was 81 degrees Fahrenheit (27.2 Celsius) with 80% humidity, making it feel like close to 90 degrees). The 22-year-old finished in 4th place with a time of 1:49:24.9, 23.8 seconds behind bronze medalist Gregorio Paltrinieri (1:49:01.1) of Italy, silver medalist Kristóf Rasovszky (1:48:59.0) of Hungary, and gold medalist Florian Wellbrock (1:48:33.7) of Germany.

To date, his swim is the closest the state of Israel has come to earning an Olympic medal in swimming.

=== 2022–24 ===
In 2022, Roditi won a gold medal in the Men's 400 metre freestyle in the Wingate League for Youth and Adults in 3:59.96. He also came in 4th in the 10 km at the European Open Water Swimming Championships in Ostia, near Rome, Italy, in 1:50:56 (as the gold medal winner Italy's Domenico Acerenza had a time of 1:50:33). At the 2022 Israeli Summer Championships in Netanya he set a national record while winning the gold medal in the men’s 1500m free with a time of 15:13.54. At the 2022 Israeli Short Course Championships in Netanya, he won a gold medal while setting a national record in the men’s 800m free with a time of 7:49.29.

In 2023 he won gold medals in the Men's 400 metre freestyle in the Israel Swimming Cup in 3:58.15, and in the Men's 800 metre freestyle in the Israel Adults Championships - Criteria Competition in 7:57.16.

In 2024, Roditi won the Israel Senior Championship 1,500 metre freestyle with a time of 15:36.30 minutes. He won the Israel Open Water Swimming 10 km Championship for the seventh consecutive year, in Eilat.

In February 2024 at the World Open Water Championships, Roditi came in 10th out of 79 swimmers in the 10 km race with a time of 1:48:31.7 (as the gold medal winner Hungary’s Kristóf Rasovszky had a time of 1:48:21.2) at the 2024 World Aquatics Championships in choppy conditions in the old Doha Port in Qatar, as the water temperature at the beginning of the race was 20 degrees Celsius (68 degrees Fahrenheit). With that finish, which he accomplished despite having broken his ankle two and a half months prior during a training camp, he qualified for the 2024 Olympic Games.

=== 2024 Olympic Games ===
Roditi represented Israel at the 2024 Paris Olympics in swimming in the Men's marathon 10 kilometre, staged at Pont Alexandre III through the Seine River, and came in 16th with a time of 1:57:02.3.

=== Career highlights ===
Event	Time	Medal	Pool Length	Age	Competition	Comp Country	Date
Men 200 freestyle	01:50.30	-	25m	21	Israel National Winter Championships (25m)	Israel	28/12/2019
Men 400 freestyle	03:46.64	-	25m	21	Israel National Winter Championships (25m)	Israel	25/12/2019
Men 800 freestyle	08:01.55	-	25m	23	15th FINA World Swimming Championships	UAE	20/12/2021
Men 1500 freestyle	14:53.12	-	25m	21	Israel National Winter Championships (25m)	Israel	27/12/2019
Men 200 backstroke	02:03.45	-	25m	21	Israel National Winter Championships (25m)	Israel	25/12/2019
Men 50 freestyle	27.93	-	50m	22	Toyota US Open 2020	USA	13/11/2020
Men 100 freestyle	57.37	-	50m	22	Toyota US Open 2020	USA	13/11/2020
Men 200 freestyle	01:53.66	-	50m	20	Israel Summer National Championships (50m)	Israel	03/08/2019
Men 400 freestyle	03:52.69	Silver	50m	24	Israel Adults Championships - Criteria Competition	Israel	07/0+/2023
Men 800 freestyle	07:57.16	Gold	50m	24	Israel Adults Championships - Criteria Competition	Israel	08/06/2023
Men 1500 freestyle	15:19.75	Silver	50m	24	Israel Adults Championships - Criteria Competition	Israel	10/06/2023
Men 5 km	55:13.20	-	-	18	17th FINA World Championships	Hungary	15/07/2017
Men 10 km	1:48:59.60	-	-	25	World Aquatics Championships - Doha	Qatar	04/02/2024

== See also ==
- List of Israeli records in swimming
