= Denis Loktev =

Israeli swimmer (born 2000)

Denis Loktev דניס לוקטב
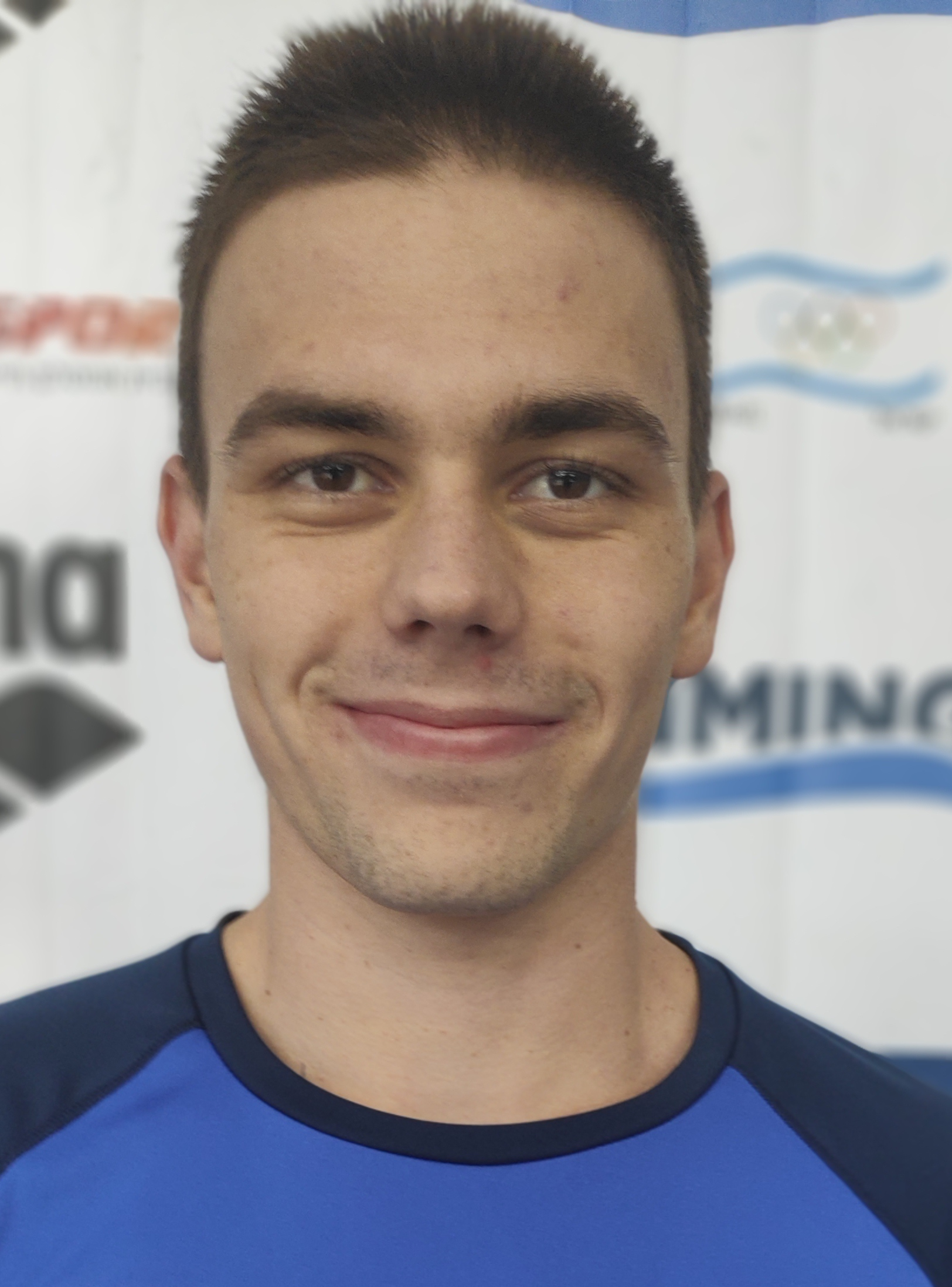

Personal information
- Nationality: Israeli
- Born: 6 April 2000 (age 26) Ashdod, Israel
- Height: 1.87 m (6 ft 2 in)

Sport
- Sport: Swimming
- Strokes: freestyle
- Club: Maccabi Ashdod
- College team: University of Louisville
- Coach: Arthur Albiero (Louisville)
Medal record
Men's swimming
Representing Israel
Summer Youth Olympics
Bronze medal – third place	2018 Buenos Aires	200 m freestyle
Maccabiah Games
Gold medal – first place	2017 Israel	200m freestyle
European Junior Swimming Championships
Gold medal – first place	2018 Helsinki	4x200m freestyle
Silver medal – second place	2018 Helsinki	200m freestyle
Bronze medal – third place	2017 Netanya	4x200m freestyle
Bronze medal – third place	2016 Hódmezővásárhely	4x200m freestyle

Denis Loktev (Hebrew: דניס לוקטב; born 6 April 2000) is an Israeli Olympic swimmer. He won a bronze medal at the 2018 Youth Olympic Games in the men's 200m freestyle, as well as the 2018 European Junior Swimming Championship in the men's 4 × 200 m freestyle. He competed at the 2020 Tokyo Olympics for Israel in the 200m freestyle, and represented Israel at the 2024 Paris Olympics in the 200 metre freestyle, 4×100 metre freestyle relay, and 4×200 metre freestyle relay.

== Early and personal life ==
Loktev was born in Ashdod, Israel where he continued to reside. On 7 October 2023, in the 2023 Hamas-led attack on Israel, his family in Ashdod was hit by rocket barrages from Gaza in the 7 October attacks.

== Swimming career ==
Loktev started swimming when he was six years old, in the Maccabi Ashdod Association, swimming twice a week, and began swimming daily by the age of seven. He has competed in the 100m freestyle, 100m medley, 200m free, 400m free, 4 × 100 m free, 4 × 100 m free mixed, 4 × 200 m free, 4 × 200 m free, and 4x50m free. He trained at the Wingate Institute in Netanya, Israel, and his primary club in Israel has been the Maccabi Ashdod.

=== 2016–20 International competition highlights ===
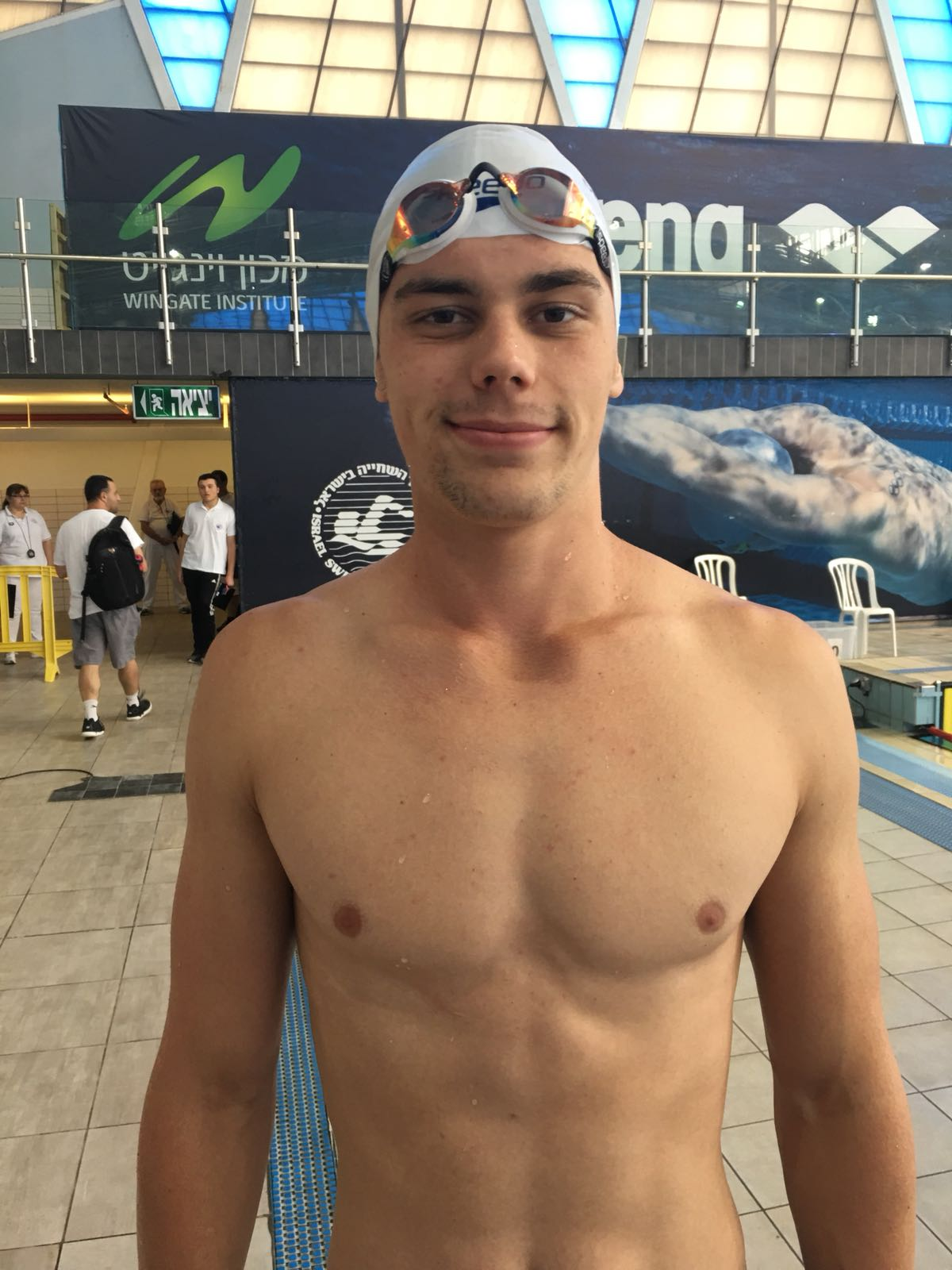
Denis Loktev, 2018.

In July 2016, Loktev won a bronze medal at the 2016 European Junior Swimming Championships in Hódmezővásárhely, Hungary, in the men's 4 × 200 m freestyle. In June 2017, he won a bronze medal at the 2017 European Junior Swimming Championships in Netanya, Israel, in the men's 4 × 200 m free. In July 2017 at the 2017 Maccabiah Games he won the gold medal in the men's 200m free.

In July 2018, he won a gold medal at the 2018 European Junior Swimming Championships in Helsinki, Finland, in the men's 4 × 200 m freestyle, and a silver medal in the 200m freestyle with a 1:47.95. In October 2018 Loktev won a bronze medal at the 2018 Youth Olympic Games in the men's 200m freestyle.

In March 2019, Loktev won the 400m freestyle with a 3:52.40 and the 200 Longcourse freestyle with a 1:48.67 at the 2019 Fédération Française de Natation Golden Tour Camille Muffat in Marseille, France. In April 2019, he set a new Israeli national record in the 400m free with a 3:51.45 at the Stockholm Open. The same month he won a silver medal at the Israel Cup in the 200m free, with a 1:48.47. In May 2019 at the 2019 Speedo Grand Challenge in Irvine, California, he won a silver medal in the 400m free super-final, at 3:54.50, and a bronze medal in the 200 L Fly, in a time of 2:03.75. In July 2019 he competed in the men's 400 metre freestyle at the 2019 World Aquatics Championships. In December 2019 at Swim Cup Amsterdam in the Netherlands, he won a silver medal in the 200 L Free in a time of 1:48.64, and a bronze medal in the 400 L Free in a time of 3:53.56.

== 2020 Tokyo Olympics (in 2021) ==
Loktev competed at the 2020 Summer Olympics in July 2021 in Tokyo in the 200m freestyle where he finished 27th. His time was 1:47.68, as he missed making the semi-finals by 1.42 seconds.

=== University of Louisville 2018-2021 ===
Loktev attended the University of Louisville, and swam for the Louisville Cardinals under Head Coach Arthur Albiero. In his freshman season, Loktev finished 8th at the 2022 NCAA Championships in Atlanta, Georgia, in the 800 freestyle relay (1:33.16). At the ACC Conference Championships, Loktev led his team to a second-place finish in the 800 freestyle relay (1:33.28).

=== 2023 World Aquatics Championship; Israeli record ===
He qualified for the 2023 World Championships in the 200m freestyle for Israel, and set a new Israeli national record as he won the gold medal in the June 2023 Israeli Championships in the event with a 1:46.17; through June, Loktev was the 15th-fastest swimmer at that distance in the world in 2023. At the championships he also won a gold medal in the 200m butterfly with a time of 2:00.55, and a silver medal in the 100m freestyle in a new personal best time of 48.54 seconds.

=== 2022 European Championships, 2023 NCAA Championships ===
As a Louisville sophomore, at the 2023 NCAA Championships in Minneapolis, Minnesota, Loktev swam the second leg of the 800 Free Relay, splitting 1:33.07 as the team swam a 6:12.25. At the ACC Championships, he won a silver medal as part of the 800 Free Relay team with a 6:11.26—the third-fastest time in school history. At the 2022 European Championships in Rome, Loktev was a part of the Israeli 4x200 freestyle relay team that finished 5th. He also helped the 4x200 freestyle mixed relay finish sixth in the finals with a leadoff split of 1:47.66 as the team posted a 7:38.45.

=== 2024 European Aquatics Championships ===
At the June 2024 European Aquatics Championships, Loktev teamed in the 200x4 freestyle with Bar Soloveychik, Eitan Ben Shetrit, and Gal Cohen Groumi and they finished 19 hundredths of a second from a bronze medal, as they came in fourth with a time of 7:09.92 minutes.

As of June 2024 his long course personal best in the 100m free was 48.54 in October 2023, and in the 200m free was 1:46.17 in September 2023.

== 2024 Paris Olympics ==
Loktev represented Israel at the 2024 Paris Olympics in the 200 metre freestyle, 4×100 metre freestyle relay, and 4×200 metre freestyle relay. He said that in the wake of the 7 October attacks: "We must do everything so that in the summer we can represent the country in the best possible way on the biggest stage in the world, the Olympic Games in Paris, and this is what gives me the motivation to train with all my might every day."

== See also ==
- List of Israeli records in swimming
- Israel at the Youth Olympics
