= List of Israeli records in swimming =

This is a list of Israeli records in swimming, which are ratified by the Israel Swimming Association. To set a record, a swimmer has to be an Israeli citizen. All records were achieved in finals unless otherwise noted.

== Long course (50 m) ==
=== Men ===
| Event | Time | | Name | Club | Date | Meet | Location | Ref |
|---|---|---|---|---|---|---|---|---|
| 50m freestyle | 21.60 | | Meiron Cheruti | Maccabi Haifa | 17 May 2025 | Union Cup | Netanya, Israel | |
| 100m freestyle | 48.18 | | Tomer Frankel | Hapoel Jerusalem | 10 June 2023 | Israeli Championships | Netanya, Israel | |
| 200m freestyle | 1:46.17 | | Denis Loktev | Maccabi Ashdod | 9 June 2023 | Israeli Championships | Netanya, Israel | |
| 200m freestyle | 1:45.59 | r, # | Denis Loktev | Israel | 10 August 2026 | European Championships | Paris, France | |
| 400m freestyle | 3:47.32 | | Bar Soloveychik | Maccabbi Kiryat Biyalik | 6 June 2024 | Israel Olympic Trials | Netanya, Israel | |
| 800m freestyle | 7:55.48 | | Bar Soloveychik | Maccabbi Kiryat Biyalik | 12 June 2021 | Israeli Summer Championships | Wingate Institute, Israel | |
| 1500m freestyle | 15:04.99 | | Matan Roditi | Bnei Herzeliya | 8 June 2024 | Israel Olympic Trials | Netanya, Israel | |
| 50m backstroke | 24.60 | tt | Jonatan Kopelev | - | 26 July 2016 | - | Israel | |
| 50m backstroke | 24.36 | sf, # | Tomer Shuster | Israel | 13 August 2026 | European Championships | Paris, France | |
| 100m backstroke | 53.60 | r, = | Yakov-Yan Toumarkin | Maccabi Ashdod | 4 August 2017 | Israeli Summer Nationals | Wingate Institute, Israel | |
| 100m backstroke | 53.60 | h, = | Adam Maraana | Maccabi Haifa | 6 June 2024 | Israel Olympic Trials | Netanya, Israel | |
| 100m backstroke | 53.39 | h, # | Tomer Shuster | Israel | 15 August 2026 | European Championships | Paris, France | |
| 200m backstroke | 1:55.96 | | Yakov-Yan Toumarkin | Maccabi Ashdod | 12 August 2015 | Israeli Championships | Netanya, Israel | |
| 50m breaststroke | 27.02 | | Kristian Pitshugin | Israel | 22 June 2024 | European Championships | Belgrade, Serbia | |
| 100m breaststroke | 59.63 | | Ron Polonsky | Maccabi Haifa | 9 August 2024 | Israeli Summer Championships | Netanya, Israel | |
| 200m breaststroke | 2:11.44 | h | Tom Be'eri | Israel | 12 August 2008 | Olympic Games | Beijing, China | |
| 50m butterfly | 23.01 | | Meiron Cheruti | Israel | 14 April 2024 | Eindhoven Qualification Meet | Eindhoven, Netherlands | |
| 100m butterfly | 50.98 | sf | Gal Cohen Groumi | Israel | 28 July 2023 | World Championships | Fukuoka, Japan | |
| 200m butterfly | 1:57.02 | h | Gal Nevo | Israel | 28 July 2009 | World Championships | Rome, Italy | |
| 200m individual medley | 1:57.01 | sf | Ron Polonsky | Israel | 22 June 2024 | European Championships | Belgrade, Serbia | |
| 400m individual medley | 4:11.51 | h | Gal Nevo | Israel | 2 August 2009 | World Championships | Rome, Italy | |
| 4×100m freestyle relay | 3:13.39 | h | Alexey Glivinskiy (48.72); Denis Loktev (48.12); Daniel Krichevsky (48.01); Martin Kartavi (48.54) | Israel | 27 July 2025 | World Championships | Singapore, Singapore | |
| 4×200m freestyle relay | 7:06.29 | h | Denis Loktev (1:47.02); Yoav Romano (1:46.92); Alexey Glivinskiy (1:46.46); Daniel Krichevsky (1:45.89) | Israel | 1 August 2025 | World Championships | Singapore, Singapore | |
| 4×100m medley relay | 3:34.91 | h | Inbar Danziger (54.46); Jonathan Itzhaki (1:01.43); Gal Cohen Groumi (50.78); Daniel Krichevsky (48.24) | Israel | 3 August 2025 | World Championships | Singapore, Singapore | |

Legend: # – Record awaiting ratification by Israel Swimming Association; WR – World record; ER – European record;
Records not set in finals: h – heat; sf – semifinal; r – relay 1st leg; rh – relay heat 1st leg; b – B final; † – en route to final mark; so – swim-off; tt – time trial

=== Women ===
| Event | Time | | Name | Club | Date | Meet | Location | Ref |
|---|---|---|---|---|---|---|---|---|
| 50m freestyle | 25.03 | | Anastasia Gorbenko | Maccabi Kiryat Bialik | 11 June 2021 | Israeli Summer Championships | Wingate Institute, Israel | |
| 100m freestyle | 54.06 | h | Andrea Murez | Israel | 28 July 2021 | Olympic Games | Tokyo, Japan | |
| 200m freestyle | 1:56.74 | r | Anastasia Gorbenko | Israel | 17 June 2024 | European Championships | Belgrade, Serbia | |
| 400m freestyle | 4:11.40 | | Daria Golovaty | Hapoel Bat Yam | 7 June 2023 | Israeli Championships | Netanya, Israel | |
| 800m freestyle | 8:41.55 | h | Meredith Budner | Israel | 14 August 2011 | Universiade | Shenzhen, China | |
| 1500m freestyle | 16:44.61 | | Gali Zilberberg | Israel | 6 July 2018 | European Junior Championships | Helsinki, Finland | |
| 50m backstroke | 27.55 | | Anastasia Gorbenko | Israel | 18 May 2025 | Mare Nostrum | Monte Carlo, Monaco | |
| 100m backstroke | 59.25 | | Anastasia Gorbenko | Israel | 22 May 2025 | Mare Nostrum | Barcelona, Spain | |
| 200m backstroke | 2:08.54 | | Anastasia Gorbenko | Israel | 29 May 2024 | Mare Nostrum | Barcelona, Spain | |
| 50m breaststroke | 30.30 | sf | Anastasia Gorbenko | Israel | 2 August 2025 | World Championships | Singapore, Singapore | |
| 100m breaststroke | 1:06.15 | h | Anastasia Gorbenko | Israel | 18 June 2024 | European Championships | Belgrade, Serbia | |
| 200m breaststroke | 2:25.20 | | Anastasia Gorbenko | Maccabi Kiryat Bialik | 11 June 2021 | Israeli Summer Championships | Wingate Institute, Israel | |
| 50m butterfly | 26.13 | sf, so | Amit Ivry | Israel | 18 August 2014 | European Championships | Berlin, Germany | |
| 100m butterfly | 58.21 | | Amit Ivry | Hapoel Emek Hefer | 8 August 2009 | Israeli Championships | Netanya, Israel | |
| 200m butterfly | 2:10.80 | b | Lea Polonsky | University of California | 2 December 2023 | U.S. Open | Greensboro, United States | |
| 200m individual medley | 2:08.55 | | Anastasia Gorbenko | Israel | 29 May 2024 | Mare Nostrum | Barcelona, Spain | |
| 400m individual medley | 4:34.79 | | Anastasia Gorbenko | Israel | 1 June 2024 | Mare Nostrum | Monte Carlo, Monaco | |
| 4×100m freestyle relay | 3:41.13 | | Lea Polonsky (56.40); Ayla Spitz (55.89); Daria Golovaty (54.71); Andrea Murez (54.13) | Israel | 19 June 2024 | European Championships | Belgrade, Serbia | |
| 4×200m freestyle relay | 7:51.83 | | Anastasia Gorbenko (1:56.74); Daria Golovaty (1:57.94); Ayla Spitz (1:59.07); Lea Polonsky (1:58.08) | Israel | 17 June 2024 | European Championships | Belgrade, Serbia | |
| 4×100m medley relay | 4:02.43 | h | Aviv Barzelay (1:02.10); Anastasia Gorbenko (1:06.49); Arielle Hayon (58.59); Lea Polonsky (55.25) | Israel | 3 August 2025 | World Championships | Singapore, Singapore | |
| 4×100m medley relay | 4:02.19 | h, # | Tom Mienis (1:00.48); Anastasia Gorbenko (1:07.31); Lea Polonsky (59.56); Daria Golovaty (54.84) | Israel | 16 August 2026 | European Championships | Paris, France | |

Legend: # – Record awaiting ratification by Israel Swimming Association; WR – World record; ER – European record;
Records not set in finals: h – heat; sf – semifinal; r – relay 1st leg; rh – relay heat 1st leg; b – B final; † – en route to final mark; so – swim-off; tt – time trial

=== Mixed relay ===
| Event | Time | | Name | Club | Date | Meet | Location | Ref |
|---|---|---|---|---|---|---|---|---|
| 4×100 m freestyle relay | 3:27.02 | | Romano Yoav (49.92); Alexey Glivinskiy (48.44); Anastasia Gorbenko (53.93); Andrea Murez (54.73) | Israel | 21 June 2024 | European Championships | Belgrade, Serbia | |
| 4×200 m freestyle relay | 7:32.96 | | Denis Loktev (1:48.08); Ron Polonsky (1:48.71); Andrea Murez (1:57.31); Anastasia Gorbenko (1:58.86) | Israel | 18 May 2021 | European Championships | Budapest, Hungary | |
| 4×100 m medley relay | 3:43.94 | h | Anastasia Gorbenko (59.59); Itay Goldfaden (59.65); Gal Cohen Groumi (51.06); Andrea Murez (53.64) | Israel | 29 July 2021 | Olympic Games | Tokyo, Japan | |

Legend: # – Record awaiting ratification by Israel Swimming Association; WR – World record; ER – European record;
Records not set in finals: h – heat; so – swim-off

== Short course (25 m) ==
=== Men ===
| Event | Time | | Name | Club | Date | Meet | Location | Ref |
|---|---|---|---|---|---|---|---|---|
| 50m freestyle | 21.08 | | Meiron Cheruti | Maccabi Haifa | 27 December 2019 | Israeli Winter Championships | Netanya, Israel | |
| 100m freestyle | 46.90 | r | Daniel Krichevsky | Hapoel Hod Hasharon | 26 December 2024 | Israeli Winter Championships | Netanya, Israel | |
| 200m freestyle | 1:43.24 | | Daniel Krichevsky | Hapoel Hod Hasharon | 27 December 2024 | Israeli Winter Championships | Netanya, Israel | |
| 400m freestyle | 3:42.86 | | Tomer Frankel | Hapoel Jerusalem | 26 December 2018 | Israeli Winter Championships | Netanya, Israel | |
| 800m freestyle | 7:49.29 | | Matan Roditi | Bnei Herzeliya | 21 December 2022 | Israeli Winter Championships | Netanya, Israel | |
| 1500m freestyle | 14:52.83 | | Gil Kiesler | Maccabi Haifa | 31 December 2016 | Israeli Winter Championships | Netanya, Israel | |
| 50m backstroke | 23.27 | | Guy Barnea | Israel | 6 December 2015 | European Championships | Netanya, Israel | |
| 100m backstroke | 50.64 | h | David Gamburg | Israel | 3 December 2014 | World Championships | Doha, Qatar | |
| 200m backstroke | 1:49.84 | | Yakov Yan Toumarkin | Israel | 2 December 2015 | European Championships | Netanya, Israel | |
| 50m breaststroke | 26.21 | sf | Kristian Pitschugin | Israel | 6 November 2021 | European Championships | Kazan, Russia | |
| 100m breaststroke | 57.56 | | Jonathan Itzhaki | Kfar Hamaccabi | 27 December 2024 | Israeli Winter Championships | Netanya, Israel | |
| 200m breaststroke | 2:05.87 | | Yakov Yan Toumarkin | Maccabi Ashdod | 26 December 2019 | Israeli Winter Championships | Netanya, Israel | |
| 50m butterfly | 22.59 | h, so, =, # | Meiron Cheruti | Israel | 2 December 2025 | European Championships | Lublin, Poland | |
| 50m butterfly | 22.59 | sf, =, # | Meiron Cheruti | Israel | 2 December 2025 | European Championships | Lublin, Poland | |
| 100m butterfly | 50.57 | | Gal Cohen Groumi | Hapoel Hod Hasharon | 22 December 2021 | Israeli Winter Championships | Netanya, Israel | |
| 200m butterfly | 1:51.84 | not ratified or later rescinded | Gal Nevo | Hapoel Jerusalem | 12 December 2009 | European Championships | Istanbul, Turkey | |
| 100m individual medley | 52.17 | | Yakov Yan Toumarkin | Israel | 28 October 2021 | World Cup | Kazan, Russia | |
| 200m individual medley | 1:53.17 | | Yakov Yan Toumarkin | Iron | 15 November 2020 | International Swimming League | Budapest, Hungary | |
| 400m individual medley | 4:00.55 | not ratified or later rescinded | Gal Nevo | Israel | 11 December 2009 | European Championships | Istanbul, Turkey | |
| 4×50m freestyle relay | 1:26.90 | h | Meiron Cheruti (21.52); Marcus Schlesinger (21.15); Tomer Frankel (21.99); Gal Cohen Groumi (22.24) | Israel | 4 December 2019 | European Championships | Glasgow, Great Britain | |
| 4×100m freestyle relay | 3:16.26 | | David Grechik; Adam Maraana; Daniel Baruch; Gregg Lichinsky | Maccabi Haifa | 20 December 2022 | Israeli Winter Championships | Netanya, Israel | |
| 4×200m freestyle relay | 7:33.69 | | | Maccabi Kiryat Bialik | 30 December 2011 | Millenium Speedo | Kiryat Bialik, Israel | - |
| 4×50m medley relay | 1:34.50 | | David Grechik (24.00); Ron Polonsky (26.20); Gregg Lichinsky (22.91); Meiron Cheruti (21.39) | Maccabi Haifa | 21 December 2022 (Note: by official result source; 22 December 2022 by national association source, a typo) | Israeli Winter Championships | Netanya, Israel | |
| 4×100m medley relay | 3:30.75 | h | Yakov-Yan Toumarkin (51.99); Kristian Pitschugin (58.67); Eitan Ben Shitrit (52.45); Denis Loktev (47.64) | Israel | 21 December 2021 | World Championships | Abu Dhabi, United Arab Emirates | |

Legend: # – Record awaiting ratification by Israel Swimming Association; WR – World record; ER – European record;
Records not set in finals: h – heat; sf – semifinal; r – relay 1st leg; rh – relay heat 1st leg; b – B final; † – en route to final mark; so – swim-off; tt – time trial

=== Women ===
| Event | Time | | Name | Club | Date | Meet | Location | Ref |
|---|---|---|---|---|---|---|---|---|
| 50m freestyle | 24.46 | r | Anastasia Gorbenko | Maccabi Kiryat Bialik | 19 December 2022 | Israeli Winter Championships | Netanya, Israel | |
| 100m freestyle | 52.16 | r | Andrea Murez | LA Current | 9 November 2020 | International Swimming League | Budapest, Hungary | |
| 200m freestyle | 1:53.50 | | Andrea Murez | LA Current | 16 November 2020 | International Swimming League | Budapest, Hungary | |
| 400m freestyle | 4:07.21 | | Andrea Murez | Hapoel Jerusalem | 7 November 2015 | Serbia Grand Prix | Zrenjanin, Serbia | |
| 800m freestyle | 8:28.29 | | Olga Beresnyeva | Israel | 22 January 2005 | World Cup | Berlin, Germany | |
| 1500m freestyle | 16:36.39 | | Ofek Adir | Hapoel Bat Yam | 24 December 2024 | Israeli Winter Championships | Netanya, Israel | |
| 1500m freestyle | 16:31.53 | # | Emily Golos | TLV Swim | 23 December 2025 | Israeli Winter Championships | Netanya, Israel | |
| 50m backstroke | 26.63 | h | Anastasia Gorbenko | Israel | 1 October 2021 | World Cup | Berlin, Germany | |
| 100m backstroke | 56.73 | # | Anastasia Gorbenko | Macabbi Kiryat Biyalik | 26 December 2025 | Israeli Winter Championships | Netanya, Israel | |
| 200m backstroke | 2:04.40 | | Anastasia Gorbenko | Maccabi Kiryat Bialik | 19 December 2022 | Israeli Winter Championships | Netanya, Israel | |
| 50m breaststroke | 29.34 | | Anastasia Gorbenko | Israel | 17 December 2021 | World Championships | Abu Dhabi, United Arab Emirates | |
| 100m breaststroke | 1:03.90 | | Anastasia Gorbenko | Israel | 3 December 2025 (Note: by official result source; 2 December 2025 by Israel Swimming Association source, a typo) | European Championships | Lublin, Poland | |
| 200m breaststroke | 2:19.22 | | Anastasia Gorbenko | LA Current | 9 September 2021 | International Swimming League | Naples, Italy | |
| 50m butterfly | 25.69 | sf | Amit Ivri | Israel | 11 December 2009 | European Championships | Istanbul, Turkey | |
| 100m butterfly | 56.75 | | Amit Ivri | Hapoel Emek Hefer | 24 December 2014 | Israeli Winter Championships | Netanya, Israel | |
| 200m butterfly | 2:09.69 | h | Keren Siebner | Hapoel Dolphin Netanya | 17 December 2015 | Israeli Winter Championships | Netanya, Israel | |
| 100m individual medley | 57.17 | | Anastasia Gorbenko | Israel | 4 December 2025 | European Championships | Lublin, Poland | |
| 200m individual medley | 2:05.04 | | Anastasia Gorbenko | LA Current | 4 September 2021 | International Swimming League | Naples, Italy | |
| 400m individual medley | 4:32.67 | | Anastasia Gorbenko | LA Current | 25 October 2020 | International Swimming League | Budapest, Hungary | |
| 4×50m freestyle relay | 1:38.53 | | Zohar Shikler (24.80); Amit Ivry (24.90); Keren Siebner (24.66); Andrea Murez (24.17) | Israel | 4 December 2015 | European Championships | Netanya, Israel | |
| 4×100m freestyle relay | 3:44.35 | | Daria Golovaty (54.81); Yuval Segal (56.68); Ofek Adir (57.31); Bekky Pozdner (55.55) | Hapoel Bat Yam | 26 December 2024 | Israeli Winter Championships | Netanya, Israel | |
| 4×200m freestyle relay | 8:40.35 | | | Maccabi Kiryat Ono | 5 March 1999 | - | HaGoshrim, Israel | - |
| 4×50m medley relay | 1:50.51 | h | Andrea Murez (28.34); Amit Ivry (30.44); Keren Siebner (26.89); Zohar Shikler (24.84) | Israel | 6 December 2015 | European Championships | Netanya, Israel | |
| 4×100m medley relay | 4:01.79 | | Ana Volchkov (1:01.44); Yuliya Banach (1:07.73); Amit Ivry (57.63); Anna Gostomelsky (54.99) | - | | - | | - |

Legend: # – Record awaiting ratification by Israel Swimming Association; WR – World record; ER – European record;
Records not set in finals: h – heat; sf – semifinal; r – relay 1st leg; rh – relay heat 1st leg; b – B final; † – en route to final mark; so – swim-off; tt – time trial

=== Mixed relay ===
| Event | Time | Name | Club | Date | Meet | Location | Ref |
|---|---|---|---|---|---|---|---|
| 4×50m freestyle relay | 1:32.55 | Ziv Kalontarov (22.09); Or Sabatier (21.75); Zohar Shikler (24.78); Andrea Murez (23.93) | Israel | 5 December 2015 | European Championships | Netanya, Israel | |
| 4×50m medley relay | 1:40.48 | Guy Barnea (23.62); Yahav Shahaff (26.84); Amit Ivri (25.83); Andrea Murez (24.19) | Israel | 3 December 2015 | European Championships | Netanya, Israel | |

Legend: # – Record awaiting ratification by Israel Swimming Association; WR – World record; ER – European record;
Records not set in finals: h – heat; so – swim-off
