= Israel Swimming Association =

LEN
- Association crest
- Founded: 1995
- Website: www.isr.org.il
- President: Miki Halika

The Israel Swimming Association (Hebrew: איגוד השחיה בישראל), founded in 1995 is the governing body of swimming in Israel. It brings together all clubs in the country, organizes the Israeli Swimming Championships as well as the swimming competition of the Maccabiah Games.

In December 2016 David Marsh was named the "Professional Advisor" of the Israel Swimming Association, with a goal of preparing the country's swimmers for the Tokyo 2020 Olympics.

In 2017 the association appointed a new head coach, Luka Gabrilo, who is a former international swimmer from Switzerland.

== See also ==
- Sport in Israel
