= Magdiel (disambiguation) =

Magdiel (Hebrew: מגדיאל) is a Hebrew name associated with any of the following:

== Place names ==
- Magdiel, one of the founding communities now part of Hod Hasharon
- Magdiel (school), a Youth Aliyah boarding school

== Biblical reference ==
Magdiel is the name of an Edomite clan mentioned in Genesis 36:31-43.
