= Naor Shiri =

Israeli politician

Faction represented in the Knesset
- 2022–2026: Yesh Atid

Personal details
- Born: 1 May 1985 (age 41) Hod HaSharon, Israel

Naor Shiri (Hebrew: נאור שירי; born 1 May 1985) is an Israeli politician who served as a member of the Knesset for Yesh Atid from 2022 until 2026.

== Biography ==
Born in Hod HaSharon in 1985, Shiri attended high school in the Mosenson Youth Village. During his national service in the Israel Defense Forces he served in the navy. He later served on Hod HaSharon City Council and as deputy mayor of the city. In 2014 he started working as an advisor to Yesh Atid MK Boaz Toporovsky.

Shiri was placed forty-sixth on the Yesh Atid list for the 2015 Knesset elections, but was not elected. He was forty-eighth on the joint Blue and White list for the April 2019 elections, but did not meet the threshold.

Prior to the 2022 Knesset elections he was placed twenty-fourth on the Yesh Atid list, and was elected to the Knesset as the party won 24 seats.
