= Magdiel (school) =

Youth Aliyah boarding school in Hod Hasharon, Israel

Coordinates: 32.161704°N 34.900799°E

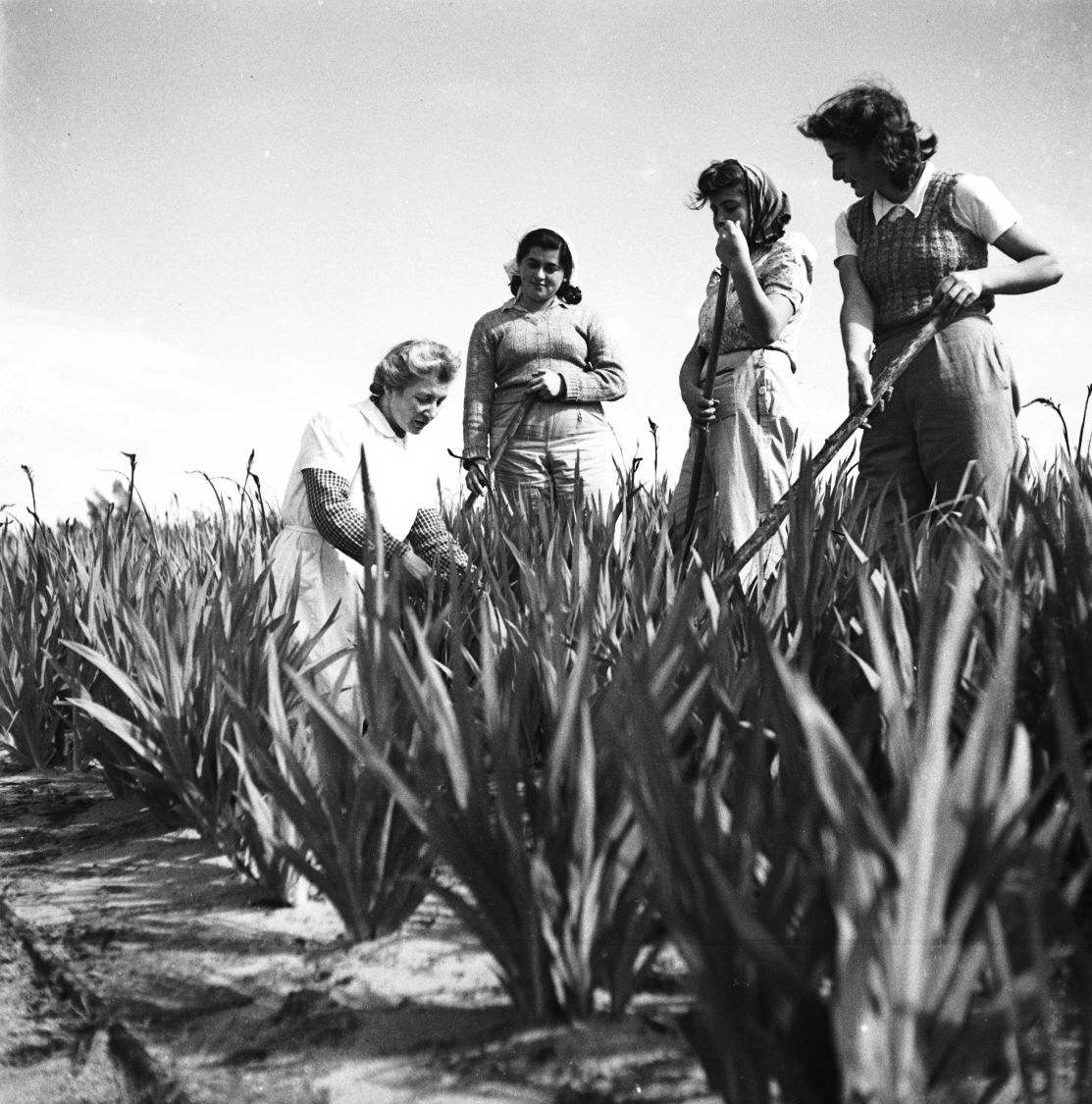
Agriculture lessons at Magdiel, 1945

Magdiel (Hebrew: מגדיאל) is a Youth Aliyah boarding school in Hod Hasharon, Israel.

== History ==
Magdiel was established as a home and school for children who survived the Holocaust. Its location, Magdiel, was an agricultural village founded in 1924 by Jewish immigrants from Russia, Poland and Lithuania, later joined by a group from the Netherlands.

In 1964, the village of Magdiel, along with Ramatayim, Hadar, and Ramat Hadar, merged to become Hod Hasharon.

Other schools at Magdiel include a comprehensive secondary school and a technical vocational boarding school of the ORT educational network.

== Notable residents ==
- Zeev Sternhell

== See also ==
- Education in Israel
