= Swimming at the 2024 European Aquatics Championships – Mixed 4 × 100 metre medley relay =

Mixed 4 × 100 metre medley relay at the 2024 European Aquatics Championships
- Venue: Sports Centre Milan Gale Muškatirović
- Dates: 18 June (heats and final)
- Competitors: 50 from 9 nations
- Teams: 9
- Winning time: 3:45.74

Medalists
gold medal	Anastasia Gorbenko; Ron Polonsky; Gal Cohen Groumi; Andrea Murez; Ayla Spitz; Jonathan Itzhaki; Ariel Hayon; Alexey Glivinskiy	Israel
silver medal	Maya Werner; Melvin Imoudu; Luca Armbruster; Nina Jazy; Noel de Geus; Björn Kammann	Germany
bronze medal	Hubert Kós; Eszter Békési; Richárd Márton; Petra Senánszky; Ádám Jászó	Hungary

The Mixed 4 × 100 metre medley relay competition of the 2024 European Aquatics Championships was held on 18 June 2024.

== Records ==
Prior to the competition, the existing European and championship records were as follows.

	Team	Time	Location	Date
World record European record	Great Britain	3:37.58	Tokyo	31 July 2021
Championship record	Great Britain	3:38.82	Budapest	20 May 2021

== Results ==
=== Heats ===
The heats were started at 10:23.
Qualification Rules: The 8 fastest from the heats qualify to the final.

Rank	Heat	Lane	Nation	Swimmers	Time	Notes
1	2	2	Poland	Kacper Stokowski (54.02); Jan Kałusowski (1:00.43); Paulina Peda (58.66); Zuzanna Famulok (55.79)	3:48.90	Q
2	2	3	Greece	Evangelos Makrygiannis (53.54); Arkadios Aspougalis (1:01.54); Anna Ntountounaki (59.08); Theodora Drakou (55.08)	3:49.24	Q
3	2	7	Germany	Maya Werner (1:03.05); Noel de Geus (59.84); Björn Kammann (51.79); Nina Jazy (55.47)	3:50.15	Q
4	1	2	Israel	Ayla Spitz (1:01.01); Jonathan Itzhaki (1:01.01); Ariel Hayon (59.61); Alexey Glivinskiy (48.93)	3:50.56	Q
5	1	4	Hungary	Ádám Jászó (54.17); Eszter Békési (1:10.00); Richárd Márton (51.98); Petra Senánszky (54.80)	3:50.95	Q
6	1	6	Denmark	Schastine Tabor (1:03.09); Jonas Gaur (1:01.98); Casper Puggaard (51.83); Signe Bro (55.37)	3:52.27	Q
7	1	7	Sweden	Samuel Tornqvist (56.54); Erik Persson (1:00.25); Edith Jernstedt (59.84); Hanna Bergman (55.91)	3:52.54	Q
8	2	1	Ireland	Lottie Cullen (1:03.72); Eoin Corby (1:00.68); Jack Cassin (54.26); Ellie McCartney (57.45)	3:56.11	Q
9	2	5	Serbia	Đorđe Dragojlović (56.91); Uroš Živanović (1:02.40); Mina Kaljević (1:02.42); Katarina Milutinović (55.45)	3:57.18	
	1	3	Switzerland	DNS		
	1	5	Slovakia	DNS		
	2	4	Finland	DNS		
	2	6	Estonia	DNS		

=== Final ===
The final was held at 20:10.

Rank	Lane	Nation	Swimmers	Time	Notes
1st place, gold medalist(s)	6	Israel	Anastasia Gorbenko (59.44); Ron Polonsky (59.80); Gal Cohen Groumi (51.90); Andrea Murez (54.60)	3:45.74	
2nd place, silver medalist(s)	3	Germany	Maya Werner (1:02.77); Melvin Imoudu (59.09); Luca Armbruster (51.51); Nina Jazy (54.75)	3:48.12	
3rd place, bronze medalist(s)	2	Hungary	Hubert Kós (53.71); Eszter Békési (1:09.05); Richárd Márton (51.75); Petra Senánszky (54.28)	3:48.79	
4	1	Sweden	Samuel Tornqvist (56.42); Erik Persson (1:00.08); Sara Junevik (58.06); Hanna Bergman (55.37)	3:49.93	
5	7	Denmark	Schastine Tabor (1:02.11); Jonas Gaur (1:02.37); Casper Puggaard (51.22); Signe Bro (55.29)	3:50.99	
6	8	Ireland	Lottie Cullen (1:01.78); Eoin Corby (1:00.77); Max McCusker (52.01); Ellie McCartney (56.50)	3:51.06	
	4	Poland	Ksawery Masiuk (53.78); Dominika Sztandera; Jakub Majerski; Kornelia Fiedkiewicz	DSQ	
	5	Greece	Evangelos Makrygiannis (52.92); Arkadios Aspougalis (1:01.31); Georgia Damasioti (57.79); Theodora Drakou	DSQ	
