= Dor Daniel =

Israeli singer, songwriter and composer

Dor Daniel דור דניאל
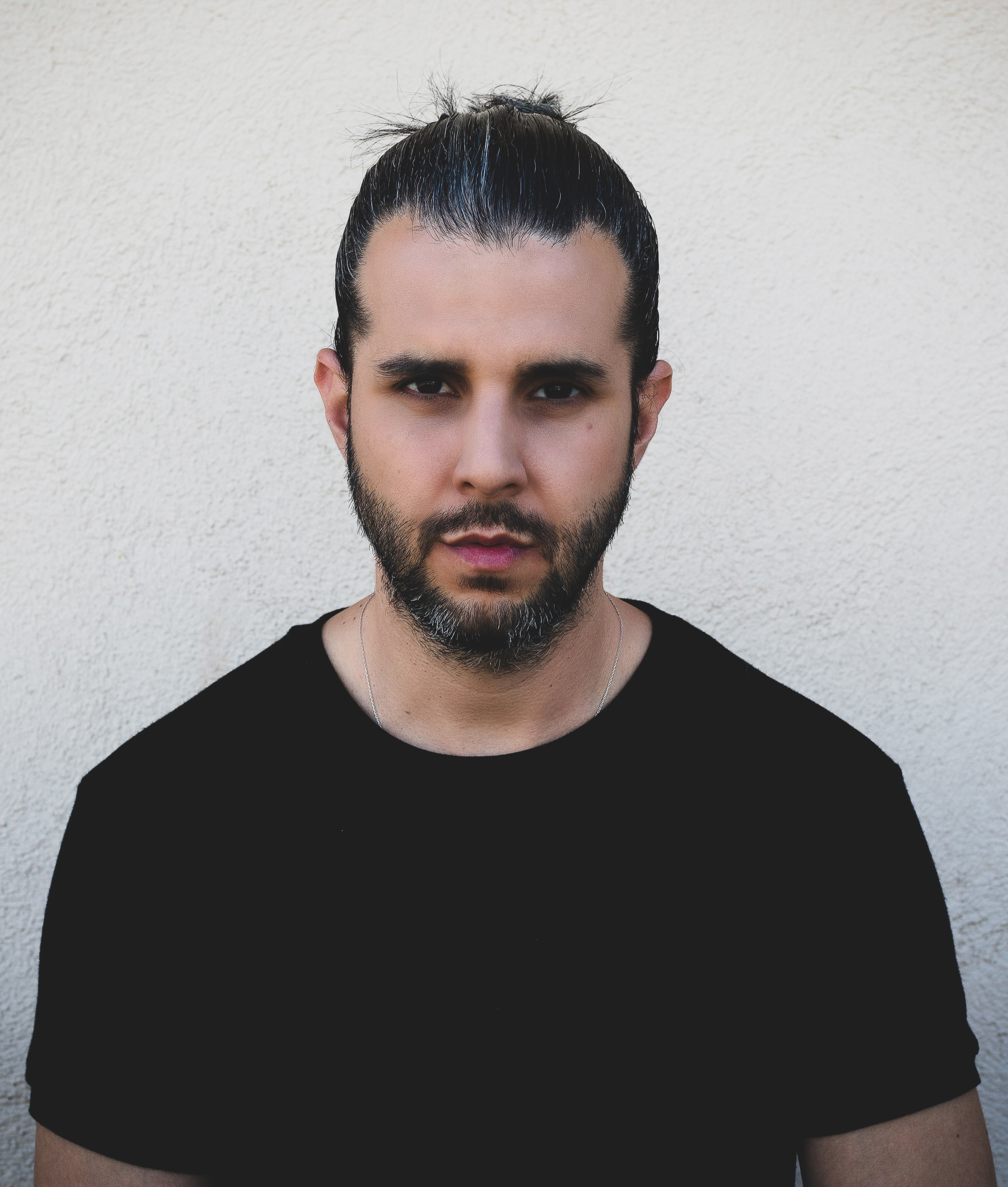
- Dor Daniel in 2021

Background information
- Born: August 29, 1982 (age 43); Hod HaSharon, Israel
- Genres: Pop
- Occupations: Singer, songwriter, musician
- Instruments: Vocals, piano
- Years active: 2005–present
- Label: Helicon Records

Dor Daniel (Hebrew: דור דניאל) born in Hod HaSharon, Israel on August 29, 1982 is an Israeli singer, songwriter and composer.

== Career ==
=== Songwriting ===
In 2000, his debut song was "Im Haiti Eloim" (meaning If I Were God) (אם הייתי אלוהים) which found some airtime on Israeli radio. He was just 18 at the time. After his military service in the Israel Defense Forces, Dor Daniel started a songwriting career in earnest with his catchy melodic pop and rock compositions from 2005 to 2008, writing initially for Harel Skaat, who he knew while in the Army. He also wrote for Miri Mesika, a friend of Skaat.

But it was with the song "Ahava ktana" אהבה קטנה meaning small love) on Shiri Maimon's debut album that gained him huge fame. It was a song he had written when he was very young and forgot in a drawer alongside tens of other songs he had written. With success of "Ahava ktana", came a contract offer from Helicon Records CEO Roni Baron for a songwriting deal. Encouraged by the success, he wrote for Idan Yaniv, Hila Zaitun, Maya Bouskilla amongst others. He also composed theme song "Time Tunnel" (מנהרת הזמן for the TV series Mean Girls (ילדות רעות) an adaptation of an American teen comedy film.

Despite earning fame as a writer, Dor Daniel saw himself first and foremost as a performing singer-songwriter and started preparing for his own debut album, but put it on hold briefly after he passed a needed surgery on his vocal cords.

=== Singing and Compositions ===
In April 2009 Daniel saw the release of his first album Between Dreams בין החלומות pronounced Bein chalomot. Daniel wrote and composed all the songs on the album, in cooperation with songwriter Meir Goldberg (מאיר גולדברג). The album was greatly expected after the pre-released singles "Makom Letzidech" מקום לצידך meaning Place your side (late 2008) and "I wanted to" (early 2009) from the upcoming debut album proved to be very successful, put on Israeli radio playlists and both peaked at number 1 in the weekly Galgalatz charts. With the album Between Dreams, an autobiographical album after his break-up with his long-running girlfriend, the title track was released as a third single, again topping the Israeli charts, and finally "Tomorrow will be fine". With these successes, Dor Daniel won the "Israeli Breakthrough Artist of the Year" by Galgalatz.

In March 2011, he released his follow-up album Ten months (עשרה חודשים), again writing and composing all the songs on the album. "Calling You" קורא לך had been pre-released from the album in December 2010 reaching the top of the charts. Shortly before the album was released, another single was released, "I'm all yours" (כולי שלך).

He cooperated with Idan Yaniv in the latter's album Yes love (כן לאהבה) particularly in the song "Never give up" (לא מוותר). In 2012, the Israeli Hot 3 station broadcast a docu-reality show Goldstar גולסטאר, a soccer-themed series with Dor Daniel as one of the participants of the football side.

In preparation of his third album he released two pre-releases from the album: "Old North" (הצפון הישן) in April 2013 and "Tmuna Mishtana" (תמונה משתנה).

In 2014, Daniel was chosen to perform the song "כנראה שניצחנו", for Honor Day יום ההוקרה, in recognition for the Israeli victims of war. The song was played in official event attended by the Israeli president and at ceremonies in schools and events throughout the country. In 2015, Art Garfunkel performed in Israel and Daniel was chosen to produce a special performance of "The Sounds of Silence" with a host of Israeli singers including Kobi Aflalo, Miki Gavrielov and Sivan Talmor. That same year, he collaborated with singer Shiri Maimon in her song "זכוכיות". In 2016, Daniel was in the panel to select the Israeli candidates for the Junior Eurovision competition and co-wrote "Follow My Heart" the Israeli entry to the competition sung by Shir & Tim. Also in 2016, he co-wrote "לאט לאט" (pronounce Leat leat meaning "Slowly slowly" for Shlomi Shabat that appeared in the latter's platinum album "הלב".

In 2017, he released ארבע שנים (meaning Four years) in preparation for his third album. He has also written a number of scores for ad campaigns notably for Mitsubishi, Hyundai, Tiv Ta'am and arrangements for the Israeli TV dance competition רק רוצים לרקוד.

== Discography ==
=== Albums ===
Year
Album
Album title
(in Hebrew)
English
Translation
ISR
Notes
2009
Bein chalomot
בין החלומות
Between Dreams

No.	Title	Length
1.	"רציתי"	3:48
2.	"בין החלומות"	3:42
3.	"גם אם לא"	4:25
4.	"מקום לצידך"	3:49
5.	"מחר יהיה בסדר"	3:34
6.	"אם רק היית יודעת"	3:13
7.	"מאבד אותך שוב"	3:57
8.	"הכל רחוק הכל איתך"	3:17
9.	"יש ימים"	3:37
10.	"שישטוף אותו"	4:26
11.	"תמונות"	3:40

2011
Eser chodeshim
עשרה חודשים
Ten Months

No.	Title	Length
1.	"מסתובבת בלילות"	4:37
2.	"אלף שאלות"	4:00
3.	"כולי שלך"	3:23
4.	"מטוסים גדולים"	3:46
5.	"עד מתי"	4:56
6.	"לאן"	4:04
7.	"לחבק אותך שוב"	4:50
8.	"קורא לך"	4:01
9.	"בואי אליי"	6:26
10.	"עשרה חודשים"	3:49

=== Singles ===
(Chart positions in Galgalatz charts)

Year	Song	Song title (in Hebrew)	English Translation	Music video	ISR	ISR Annual	Album
2008	Makom letzidech	מקום לצידך	By your side		1	2	Between Dreams
2009	Rtziti	רציתי	I wanted to		1	14	Between Dreams
2009	Bein chalomot	בין החלומות	Between Dreams		1	12	Between Dreams
2009	Makha ihye besede	מחר יהיה בסדר	Tomorrow will be fine				Between Dreams
2010	Kore lach	קורא לך	Calling You		2		Ten Months
2011	Kuli shelach	כולי שלך	I'm Yours				Ten Months
2011		מסתובבת בלילות	Turn night				
2011	Liyan	לאן	Where				
2011	Boe elay	בואי אליי	Come to me				
2013	Hatzafon Hayashan	הצפון הישן	Old North				TBA
2013	Tmuna mishtana	תמונה משתנה	Image Transition				TBA

== Filmography ==
- 2005: Soundtrack for short Et Effi Dofkim Rak Pa'am Ahat
- 2012: Goal Star (TV series)
