= Ehud Tenenbaum =

Israeli hacker (born 1979)

Ehud Tenenbaum אהוד טננבאום
- Born: August 29, 1979 (age 47); Hod HaSharon, Israel
- Other names: The Analyzer, Solar Sunrise, Udi
- Occupation: Computer security analyst
- Convictions: Admitted to hacking US and Israeli computers, and pled guilty to conspiracy, wrongful infiltration of computerized material, disruption of computer use and destroying evidence
- Penalty: Six months of community service, one year of probation, a two-year suspended prison sentence and fined about US$18,000

Ehud "Udi" Tenenbaum (Hebrew: אהוד "אודי" טננבאום; born August 29, 1979), also known as The Analyzer, is an Israeli hacker.

== Biography ==
Tenenbaum was born in Hod HaSharon in 1979. He became famous in 1998 when he was arrested for hacking computers belonging to NASA, The Pentagon, the U.S. Air Force, the U.S. Navy, the Knesset, MIT, among other high-profile organizations. He also hacked into the computers of Palestinian groups and claimed to have destroyed the website of Hamas. To do this, Tenenbaum installed packet analyzer and trojan horse software on some of the hacked servers.

The then-US Deputy Defense Secretary John Hamre stated that the attack was "the most organized and systematic attack to date" on US military systems. The military had thought that they were witnessing sophisticated Iraqi 'information warfare'. In an effort to stop the attack, the United States government assembled agents from the FBI, the Air Force Office of Special Investigations, NASA, the US Department of Justice, the Defense Information Systems Agency, the NSA, and the CIA. The government was so worried that the warning and briefings went all the way up to the President of the United States. The investigation, code-named "Solar Sunrise," eventually snared two California teenagers. After their arrest, a subsequent probe led US investigators to Tenenbaum, who was arrested after Israeli police were given evidence of Tenenbaum's activities. Later, the FBI sent agents to Israel to question Tenenbaum.

Before he was sentenced, Tenenbaum served briefly in the Israel Defense Forces, but was released soon thereafter after he was involved in a traffic collision.

In 2001, Tenenbaum pleaded guilty, while stating that he was not attempting to infiltrate the computer systems to get a hold of secrets but rather to prove that the systems were flawed. Tenenbaum was sentenced to a year and a half in prison, of which he served only 8 months following the "Deri Law". After the attack, the FBI made a short 18 minutes training video called, Solar Sunrise: Dawn of a New Threat that was sold as part of a hacker defense course that was discontinued in September 2004.

In 2003, after being freed from prison, Tenenbaum founded his own Information security company called "2XS".

In September 2008, following an investigation by Canadian police and the US Secret Service, Tenenbaum and three accomplices were arrested in Montreal. Tenenbaum was charged with six counts of credit card fraud, in the sum of approx. US$1.5 million. U.S. investigators suspected Tenenbaum of being part of a scam, in which the hackers penetrated financial institutions around the world to steal credit card numbers. They then sold these numbers to other people, who used them to perpetrate massive credit card fraud. He was later extradited to the United States to stand trial, and was in the custody of the US Marshals for more than a year. In August 2010, he was released on bond after agreeing to plead guilty.

In July 2012, after Tenenbaum accepted a plea bargain which may have involved cooperation in the investigation, New York district judge Edward Korman sentenced Tenenbaum to the time already served in prison. Tenenbaum was also ordered to pay $503,000 and was given three years' probation.

On 26 May 2026, Tenenbaum was arrested at a Polish airport on the request of the Dutch authorities, who accused him to be the central figure in an international crypto investment fraud network. He just arrived from Dubai where he resided, and was extradited to the Netherlands shortly after his arrest. The fraud operation, named Operation Sunflower, was active since 2021, would allegedly exist out of roughly 20 call centers and more than 700 people posing as financial advisers, an organization that took in hundreds of millions of euros. Five other suspects were arrested in July.
