= Gal Cohen Groumi =

Israeli swimmer (born 2002)

Gal Cohen Groumi גל כהן גרומי
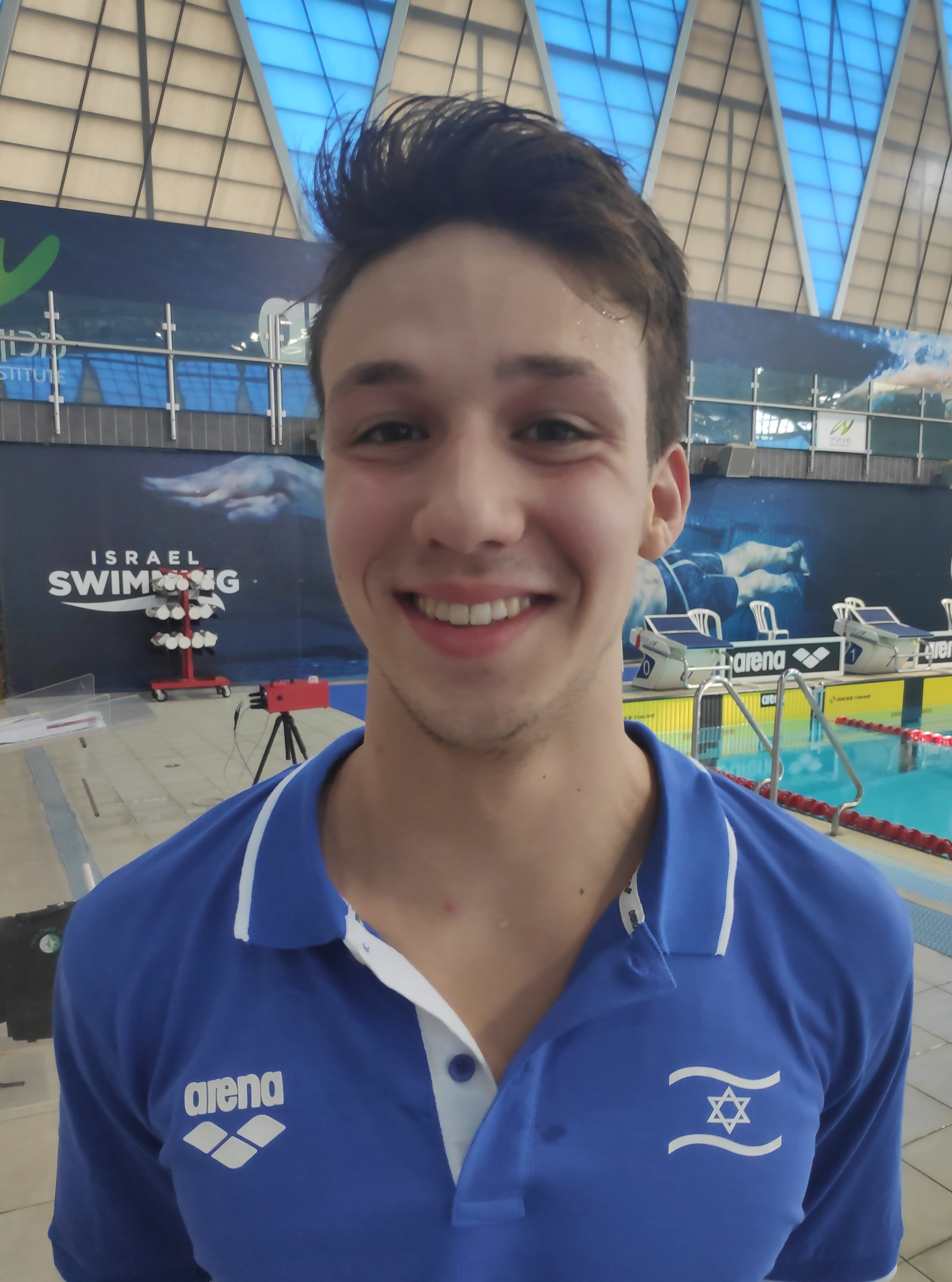
- Gal Cohen Groumi in 2019

Personal information
- Nationality: Israeli
- Born: 22 April 2002 (age 24) Hod HaSharon, Israel
- Height: 1.88 m (6 ft 2 in)

Sport
- Sport: Swimming
- Strokes: IM, butterfly, freestyle
- Club: Hapoel Hod Hasharon
- College team: Michigan Wolverines
- Coach: Luca Gavrilo, Zohar Galili, Nikita Shkilenko, Tom Rushton, and David Marsh; Mike Bottom, Mat Bowe (U of M)
Medal record
Men's swimming
Representing Israel
European Championships
Gold medal – first place	2024 Belgrade	4×100m mixed medley
Maccabiah Games
Gold medal – first place	2022 Israel	100m fly
European Junior Championships
Bronze medal – third place	2019 Kazan	200m IM
Gold medal – first place	2018 Helsinki	4×200 m freestyle relay
European Youth Olympics
Silver medal – second place	2017 Győr	4×100m medley relay
Silver medal – second place	2017 Győr	4x100m mixed medley relay

Gal Cohen Groumi (Hebrew: גל כהן גרומי; born 22 April 2002) is an Israeli Olympic swimmer. He won two silver medals in medley relay at the 2017 European Youth Olympics, a gold medal in the 4 × 200 m freestyle relay at the 2018 European Junior Swimming Championships, and a bronze medal in the 200m IM at the 2019 European Junior Swimming Championships. At the 2024 European Championships Mixed 4×100 metre medley relay, he won a gold medal. Cohen Groumi represented Israel at the 2024 Paris Olympics in the 100 metre butterfly, 4×100 metre freestyle relay, 4×200 metre freestyle relay, and Mixed 4×100 metre medley relay.

== Early life ==
Cohen Groumi was born in Hod HaSharon, Israel, and is Jewish. He has a younger brother and a younger sister. His uncle is Israeli former Olympic swimmer Eran (Cohen) Groumi. He started swimming classes around the age of ten, and was active in martial arts, particularly judo and capoeira. He attended Mosenson Preparatory School for high school in Hod Hasharon outside Tel Aviv.

== Swimming career ==
His father taught him how to swim because it was something he felt his son needed to know, but never pushed him to be a swimmer. Cohen Groumi trains with Hapoel Hod Hasharon, and his coaches are Zohar Galili, Nikita Shkilenko, Tom Rushton, and David Marsh.

=== 2017–18; European Youth Olympics silver medals ===
In July 2017 in Győr, Hungary, Cohen Groumi won silver medals in the 2017 European Youth Olympics in both the 4 × 100 m Medley Relay, along with David Gerchik, Ron Polonsky, and Michael Smirnov, and in the 4 × 100 m mixed medley relay, with David Gerchik, Lea Polonsky, and Anastasia Gorbenko.

At the 2018 European Junior Swimming Championships in July 2018 in Helsinki, Finland, at 16 years of age he won a gold medal in the 4 × 200 m freestyle relay with Denis Loktev, Bar Soloveychik, and Tomer Frankel. He said: "For the final status, I sacrificed an individual 200 meter medley final, and it was worth it, because winning gold with your friends is much more fun than a personal achievement, it's very powerful." In October 2018, he competed in the Summer Youth Olympics in Buenos Aires, Argentina, finishing 4th in the 200 meter individual medley, an event that would remain a strength.

=== 2019 European Junior Championships bronze medal ===
At the 2019 European Junior Swimming Championships, in July in Kazan, Russia, Cohen Groumi won an individual bronze medal with a 2:00.48 in the 200m IM.

=== 2020 Tokyo Olympics (in 2021) ===
At the 2020 Summer Olympics, Cohen Groumi competed in the men's 4×200 metre freestyle relay, finishing 10th with a combined time of 7:08.65 (as he swam 1:46.41 as the anchor). He also competed in the 200 IM, finishing 30th with a personal best time of 1:59:44.

Perhaps his most significant event was when he swam fly on the 4 × 100 m Medley Relay, where an 8th-place finish with a combined team time of 3:44.77 set a new Israeli record, which brought considerable national attention to the young swimmer. He was also registered to swim the 100 Fly, but scratched it to improve the possibility of team success in the relay.

=== 2021–22; Big Ten championship, Maccabiah Games championship ===
Cohen Groumi began swimming for the University of Michigan Wolverines in the Big Ten Conference on a full swimming scholarship beginning in the Fall of 2021, and was enrolled in the College of Literature, Science, and the Arts as a mathematics and statistics major. At the 2022 Big Ten Championships in February in West Lafayette, Indiana, as a freshman he won the gold medal in the 200-yard IM (1:41.54), silver medals in the 200-yard Butterfly (1:40.59) and the 800 freestyle relay (6:14.59), and the bronze medal in the 100-yard Butterfly (45.01), and was named All Big-Ten First Team.

At the 2022 Maccabiah Games in Israeli in July, Cohen Groumi won the gold medal in the 100 fly, in a time of 53.21.

=== 2023–present; Big Ten Championships, European Championship ===
At the February 2023 Big Ten Championships in Ann Arbor, Michigan, as a sophomore Cohen Groumi was a Big Ten Champion in the 200-yard IM (1:41.20) and the 100 yard butterfly (44.50; a new Big Ten meet record), won silver medals in the 800-Yard Freestyle Relay (6:13.51), 200-Yard Medley Relay (1:23.07), and 200-Yard Butterfly (1:40.21), won a bronze medal in the 200-Yard Freestyle Relay (1:16.60), and was All-Big Ten First Team. In March 2023 at the 2023 NCAA Championships in Minneapolis, Minnesota, he was the only Michigan team member to win All-American honors, winning them in the 200-yard Butterfly as he finished eighth with a time of 1:42.37.

In 2024 as a junior at the Big Ten Conference Championships in March he won gold medals in the 200-Yard Butterfly (1:39.60) and 200-Yard IM (1:40.48), and won the silver medal in the 100-Yard Butterfly (44.60). Cohen Groumi was named Big Ten Swimmer of the Championships.

At the 2024 European Championships Mixed 4 × 100 m medley relay in June he swam the fly and won a gold medal with Anastasia Gorbenko, Ron Polonsky, and Andrea Murez with a time of 3:45.74.

As of June 2024, Cohen Groumi's personal best in the 100m butterfly was 50.98, in the 100m free was 49.28, and in the 200m free was 1:47.39.

=== 2024 Paris Olympics ===
Cohen Groumi represented Israel at the 2024 Paris Olympics in the 100 metre butterfly, 4×100 metre freestyle relay, 4×200 metre freestyle relay, and Mixed 4×100 metre medley relay.

== See also ==
- List of Israeli records in swimming
- List of European Aquatics Championships medalists in swimming (men)
