= Hod HaSharon =

City in central Israel

Hod HaSharon הוד השרון (Hebrew)
- City

Hebrew transcription(s)
  - ISO 259: Hod ha-Šaron
  - Transliteration: Hod Ha'Sharon
  - Transliteration: Hod HaSharon
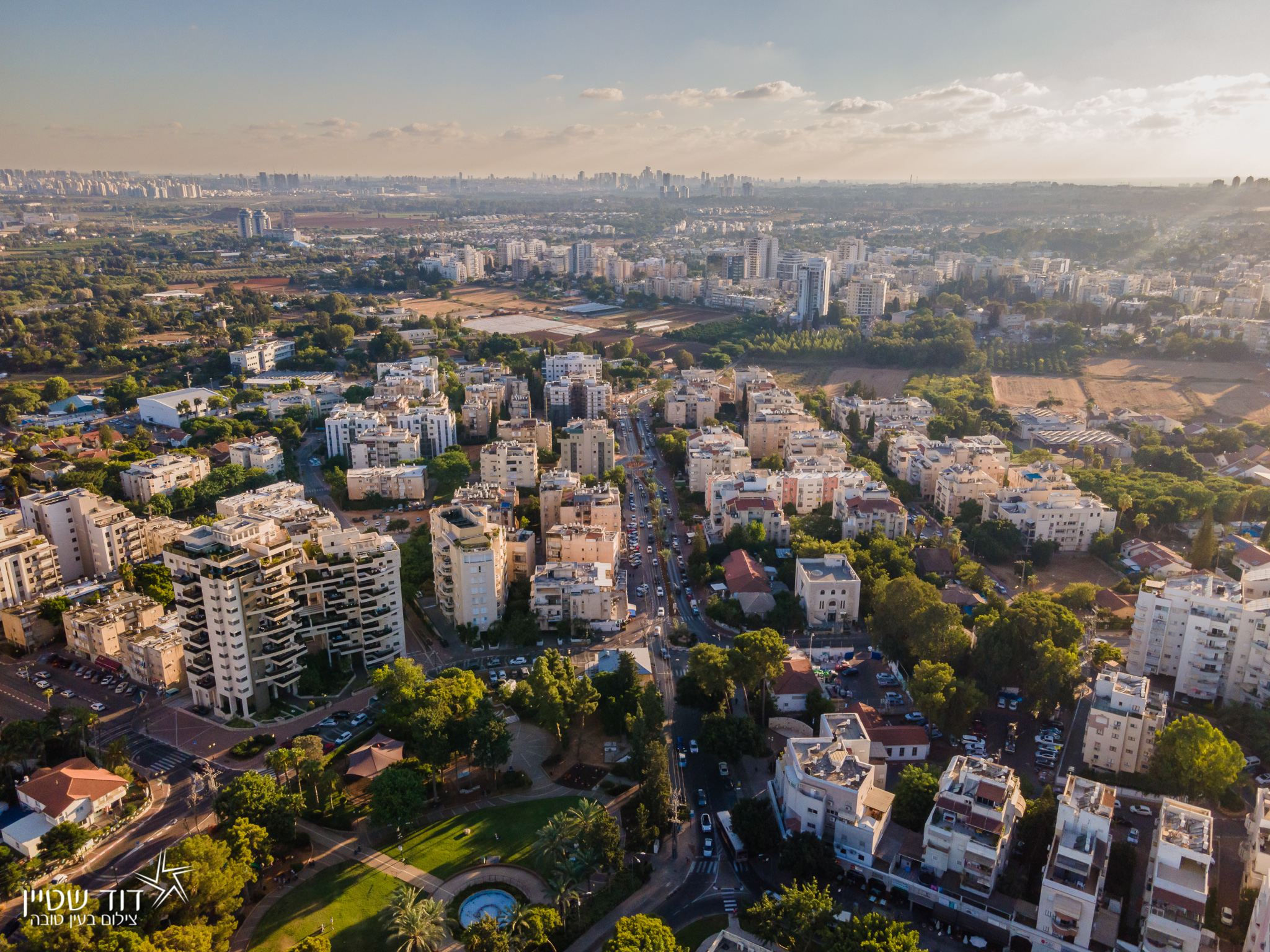
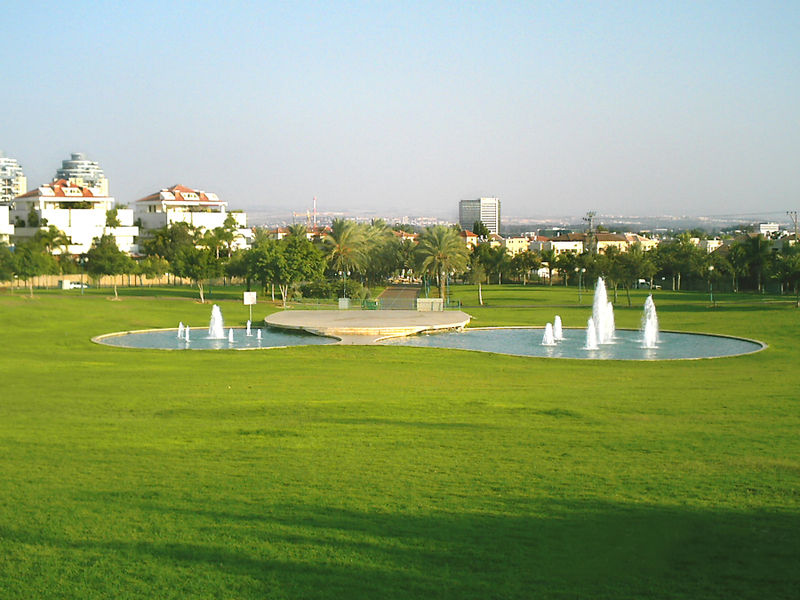
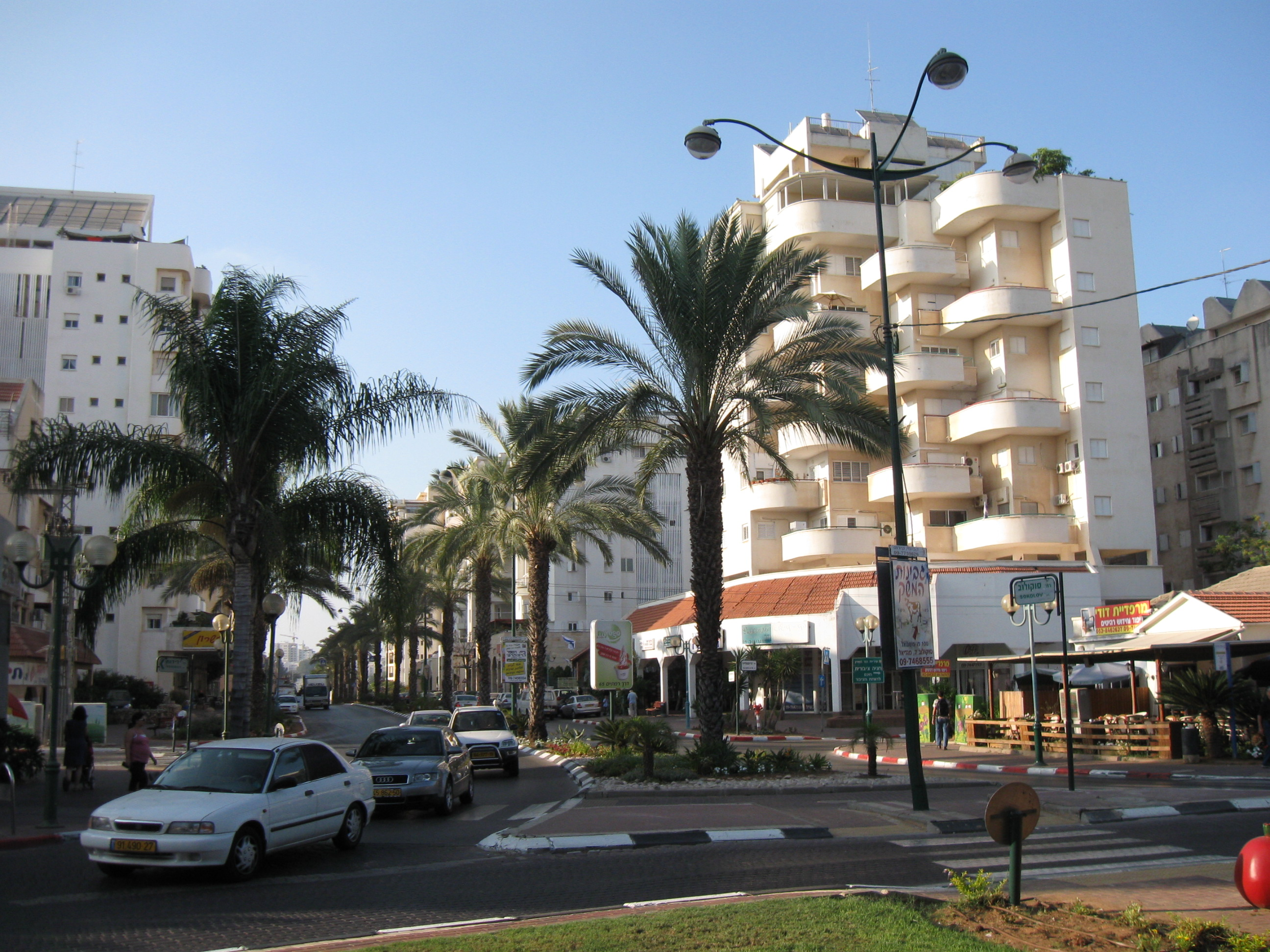
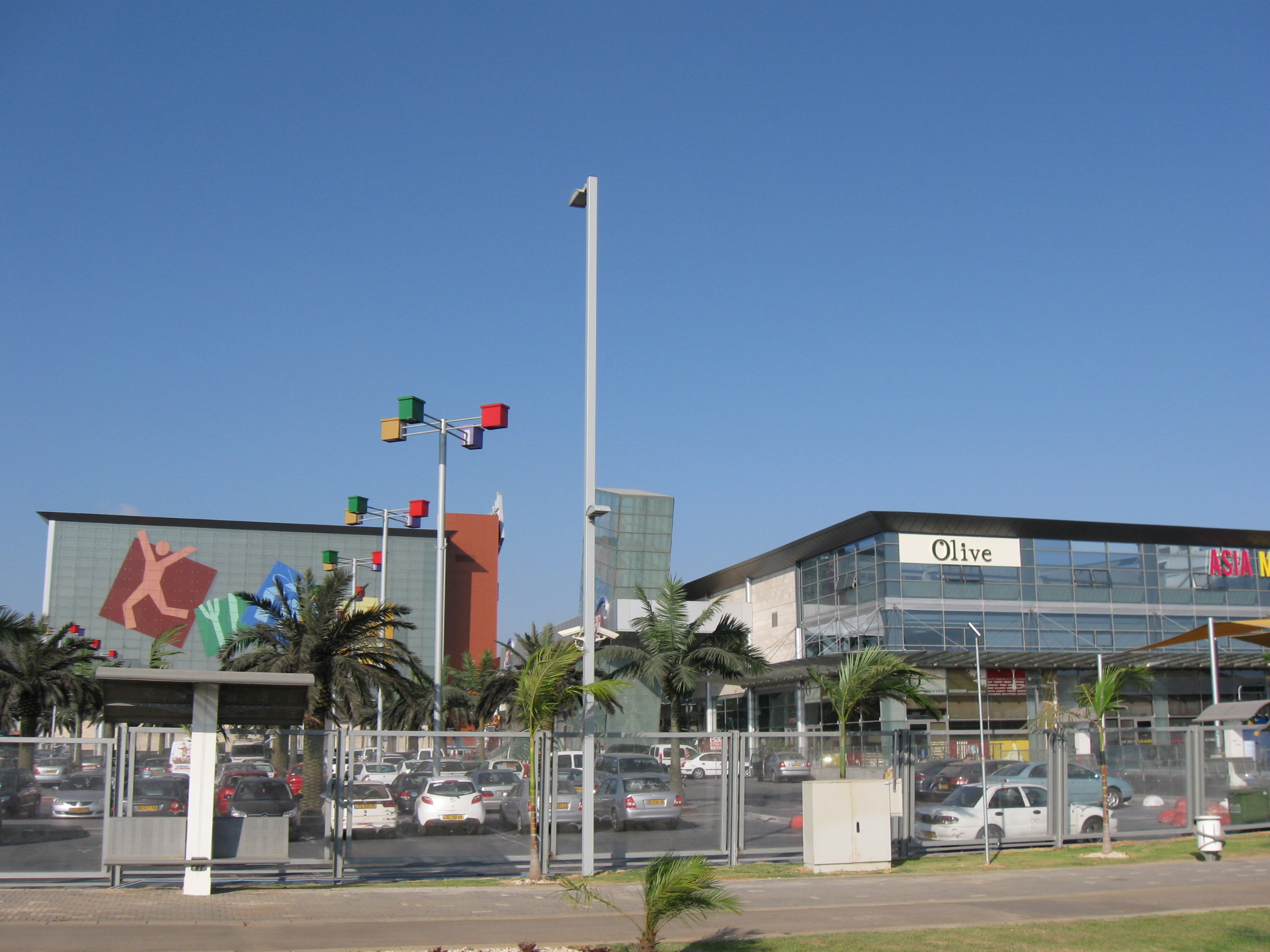
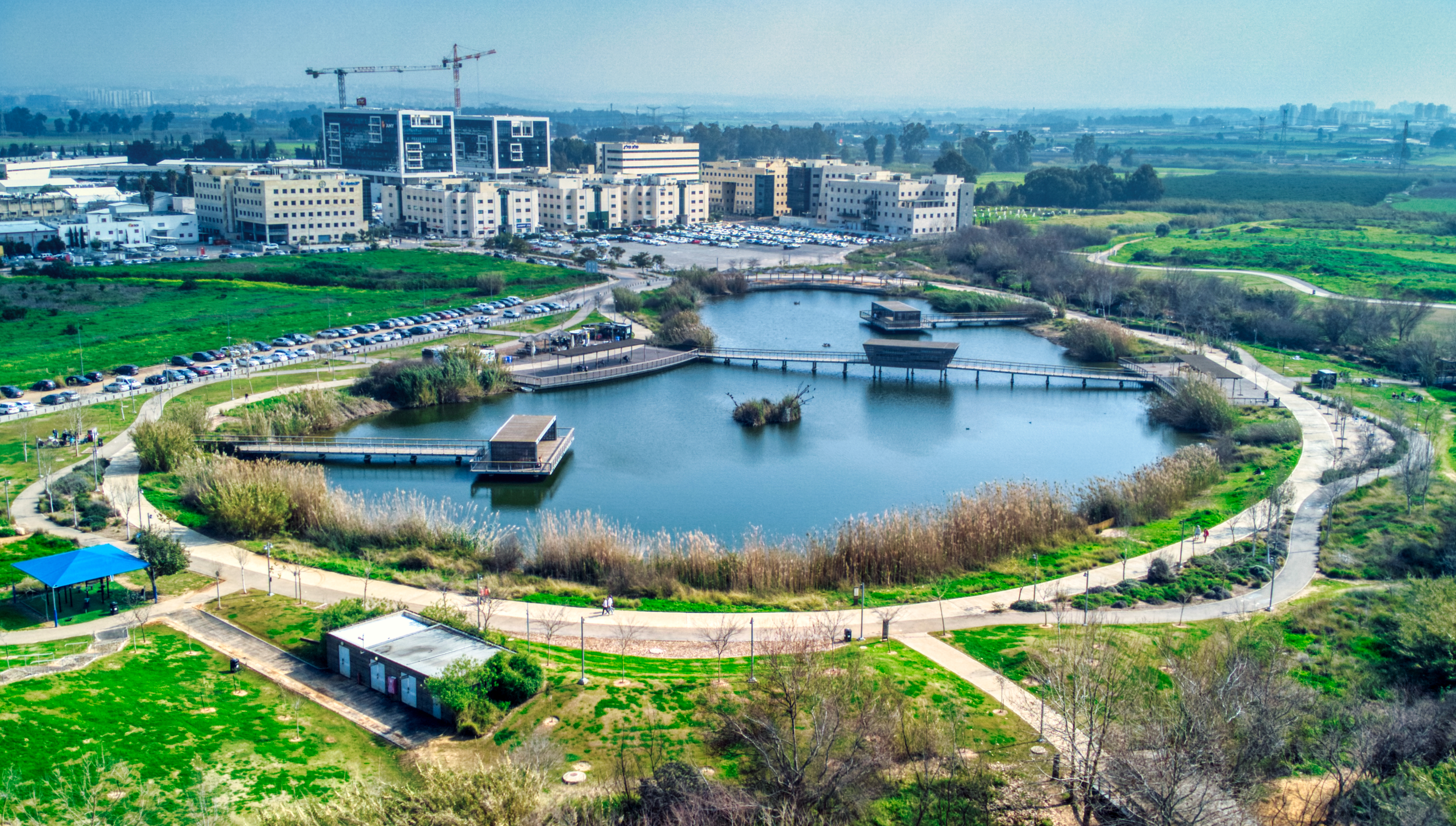

- Municipal seal

- Location within Central Israel Location within Israel
- Coordinates: 32°09′N 34°53′E
- Country: Israel
- District: Central
- Subdistrict: Petah Tikva
- Natural Region: Southern Sharon
- Founded: 1964

Government
  - Type: Mayor–council
  - Body: Municipality of Hod HaSharon
  - Mayor: Amir Kochavi

Area
  - Total: 19,236 dunams (19.236 km^{2}; 7.427 sq mi)

Population (2024)
  - Total: 66,398
  - Density: 3,451.8/km^{2} (8,940.0/sq mi)

Ethnicity
  - Jews and others: 99.9%
  - Arabs: 0.1%
- Time zone: UTC+2 (IST)
  - Summer (DST): UTC+3 (IDT)
- Name meaning: Splendor of the Sharon
- Website: hod-hasharon.muni.il

Hod HaSharon (Hebrew: הוד השרון, lit. 'Splendor of the Sharon') is a city in the Central District of Israel. The city is located approximately ten kilometres (six miles) east of the Mediterranean coastline, south of Kfar Saba, southeast of Ra'anana, and northeast of Ramat HaSharon. In 2026 it had a population of 63,700.

Hod HaSharon was officially formed and made a local council in 1964 by the merging of four moshavot: Magdiel, Ramatayim, Kfar Hadar, and Ramat Hadar. The land area of Hod HaSharon is 19.2 square kilometres (7 7/16 sq mi).

== History ==
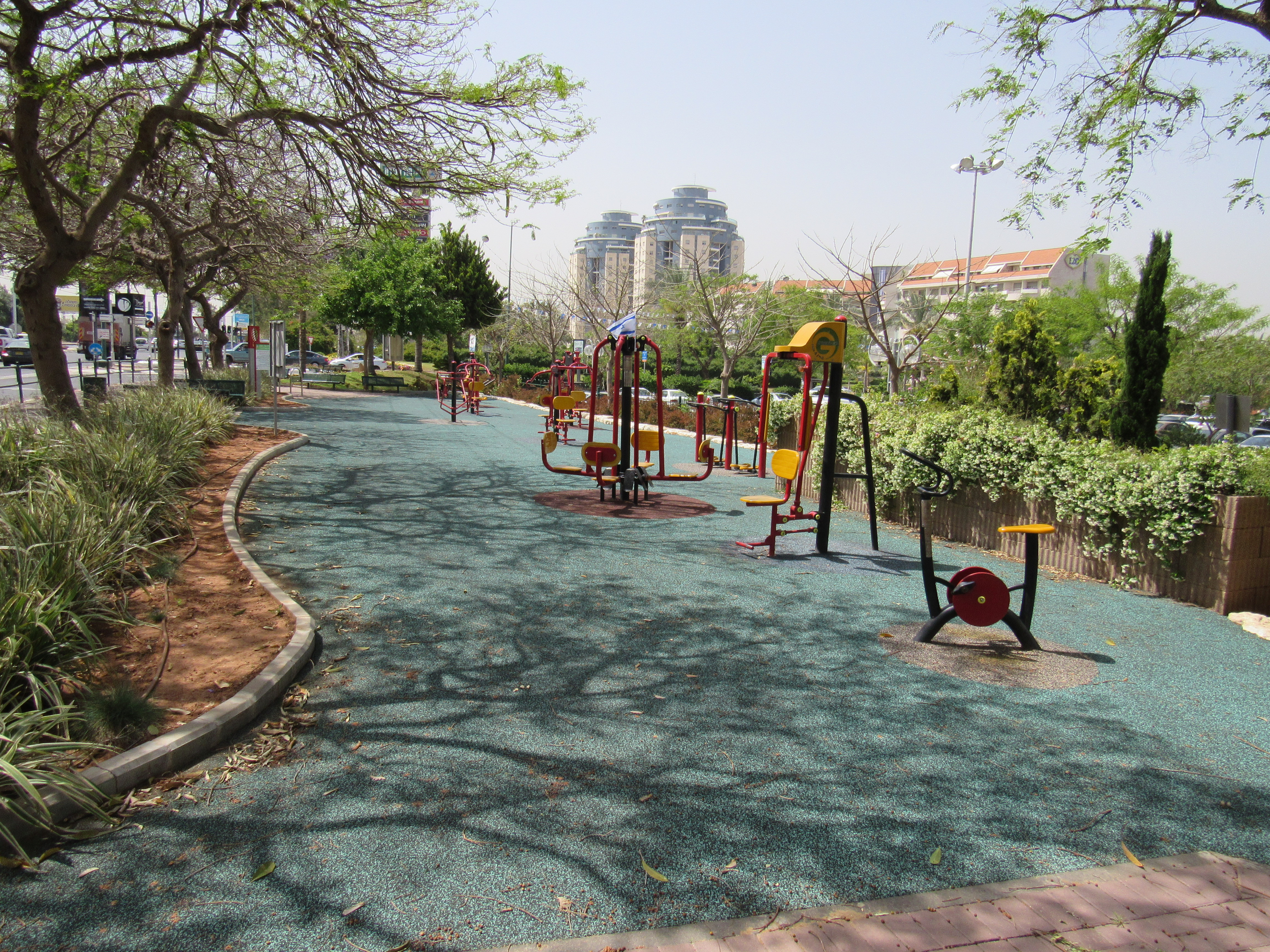
Park in Hod HaSharon

Hod HaSharon is home to Tel Qana, an archaeological site inhabited in the Early, Middle, and Late Bronze Ages, Iron Age I–II, and the Persian, Roman, and Byzantine periods.

A 1,300-year-old olive oil factory, of mason-worked blocks, was unearthed in Hod HaSharon. According to the Israel Antiquities Authority (IAA), the size of the press suggested it was meant for commercial production, rather than local or personal use."

Before the 20th century, the area of Hod HaSharon formed part of the Forest of Sharon, a hallmark of the region's historical landscape; the landscape was an open woodland, dominated by sections of Mount Tabor oak (Quercus ithaburensis), extending from Kfar Yona in the north to Ra'anana in the south. Traditionally, the local Arab inhabitants used the area for pasture, firewood and intermittent cultivation. The intensification of settlement and agriculture on the coastal plain during the 19th century led to deforestation and subsequent environmental degradation, known from Hebrew sources.

In 1964, Hod HaSharon was created through a merger of Magdiel with Hadar Ramatayim, an administrative body which encompassed the former moshavot of Ramatayim, Hadar and Ramat Hadar. Hod Hasharon was governed by a local council until it was declared a city in April 1990.

=== Magdiel ===
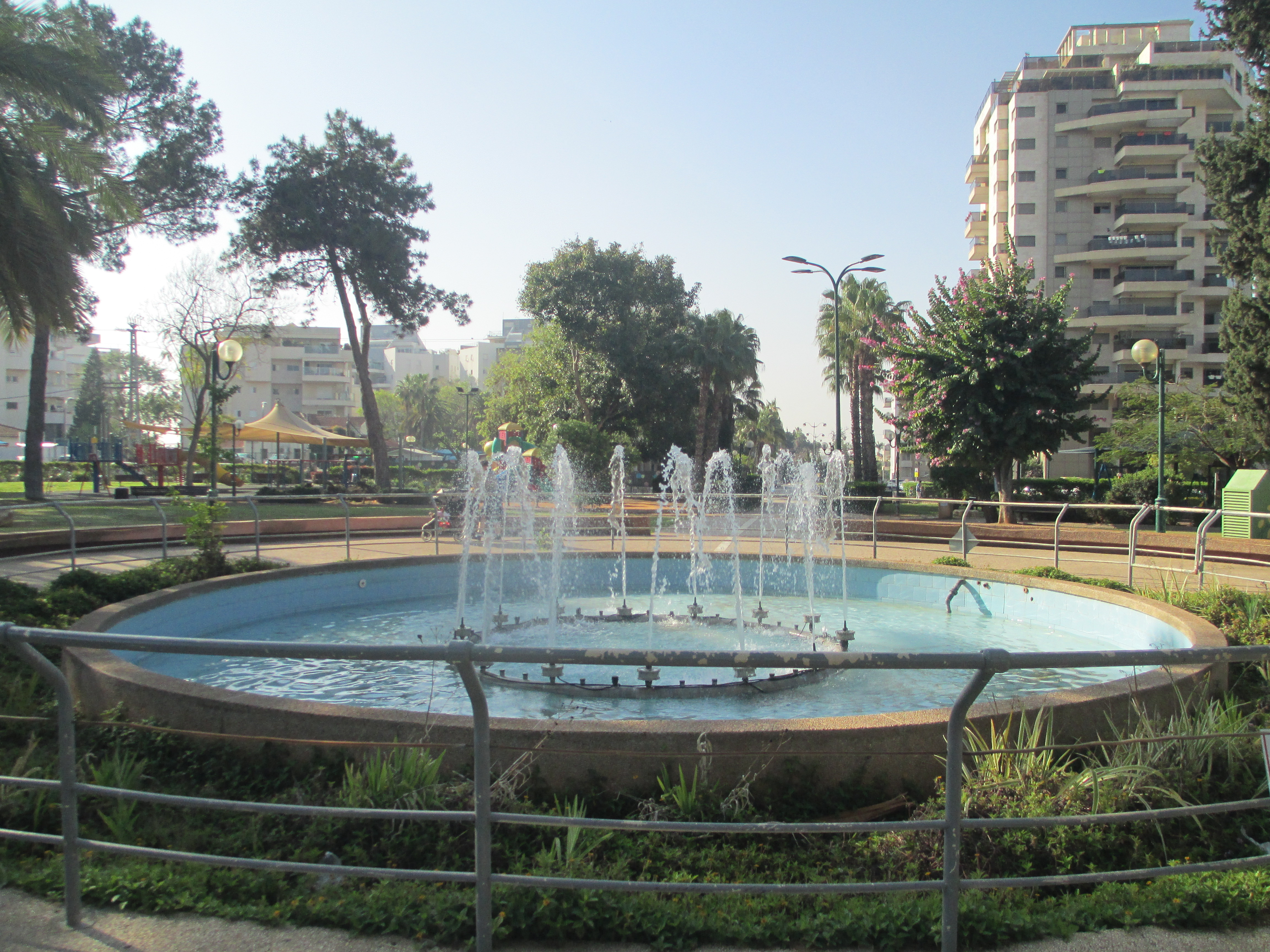
Magdiel Garden

Magdiel was founded on 2 August 1924, by a group of twelve Ashkenazi families. They received a plot of land from Yehoshua Hankin, which they cultivated and prepared for farming. Magdiel was established as a moshava, starting on 4,000 dunams of land purchased near the Arab village of Biyar 'Adas. The initial population included immigrants from Russia, Poland and Lithuania, later joined by a group from the Netherlands.

=== Ramatayim ===
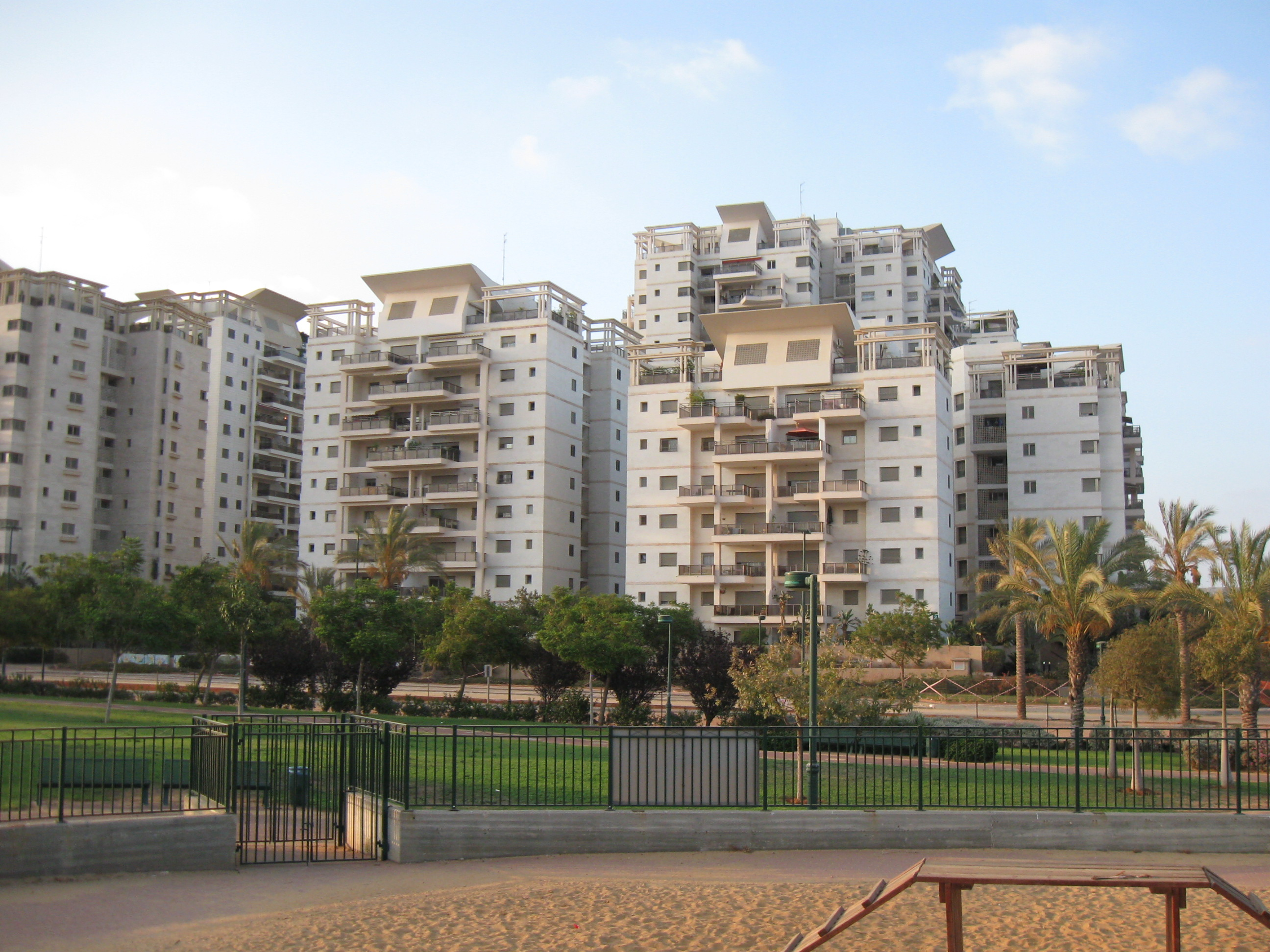
Atidim Park

Ramatayim was founded in July 1925 by immigrants from Poland. It was founded on the principle of private initiative. Ramatayim was built on two hills connected by a valley, hence the name Ramatayim (literally "two hills"). According to a census conducted in 1931 by the British Mandate authorities, Ramatayim had a population of 180, in 31 houses. In 1949, Ramatayim became the first local council to be established in Israel.

=== Kfar Hadar ===
Kfar Hadar was established in 1927 by Yael Leah Eichhorn, a middle-class immigrant from Eastern Europe, who was joined soon thereafter by a group of Italian immigrants. The land was purchased from the Abu Kishk Bedouin tribe. The pioneers decided to build a rural settlement founded on citrus farming (hence the village's name, "Hadar", Hebrew for "citrus"). In its early years, the farmers of Kfar Hadar also engaged in poultry farming. According to the 1931 census, Kfar Hadar had 71 inhabitants, all Jews, in 23 houses.

In the early 1940s, Yemenite immigrants moved to Kfar Hadar, establishing the Shikun Hateymanim quarter, today part of the Gannei Tzvi neighborhood. In 1951, Ramatayim and Kfar Hadar merged to form Hadar Ramatayim. In April 1956, the boundaries of Hadar Ramatayim were extended to include the ma'abara of Ganei Tzvi, established in the end of 1948 Arab–Israeli War as Kfar Nitzahon, and renamed earlier in 1956 after Lord Harry (Tzvi) Morris of Kenwood, a major donor of the Jewish National Fund.

=== Ramat Hadar ===
Ramat Hadar was established in December 1938 by middle-class immigrants fleeing from Nazi Germany, members of the Fifth Aliyah. Ramat Hadar was built on a hill south of Hadar, near the main road from Petah Tikva to Ramatayim (nowadays road 402). The economy of Ramat Hadar was based on small farms, mainly poultry, as well as citrus orchards. Ramat Hadar had its own post office from 1959 til 1989. In 1963, Ramat Hadar became part of Hadar Ramatayim.

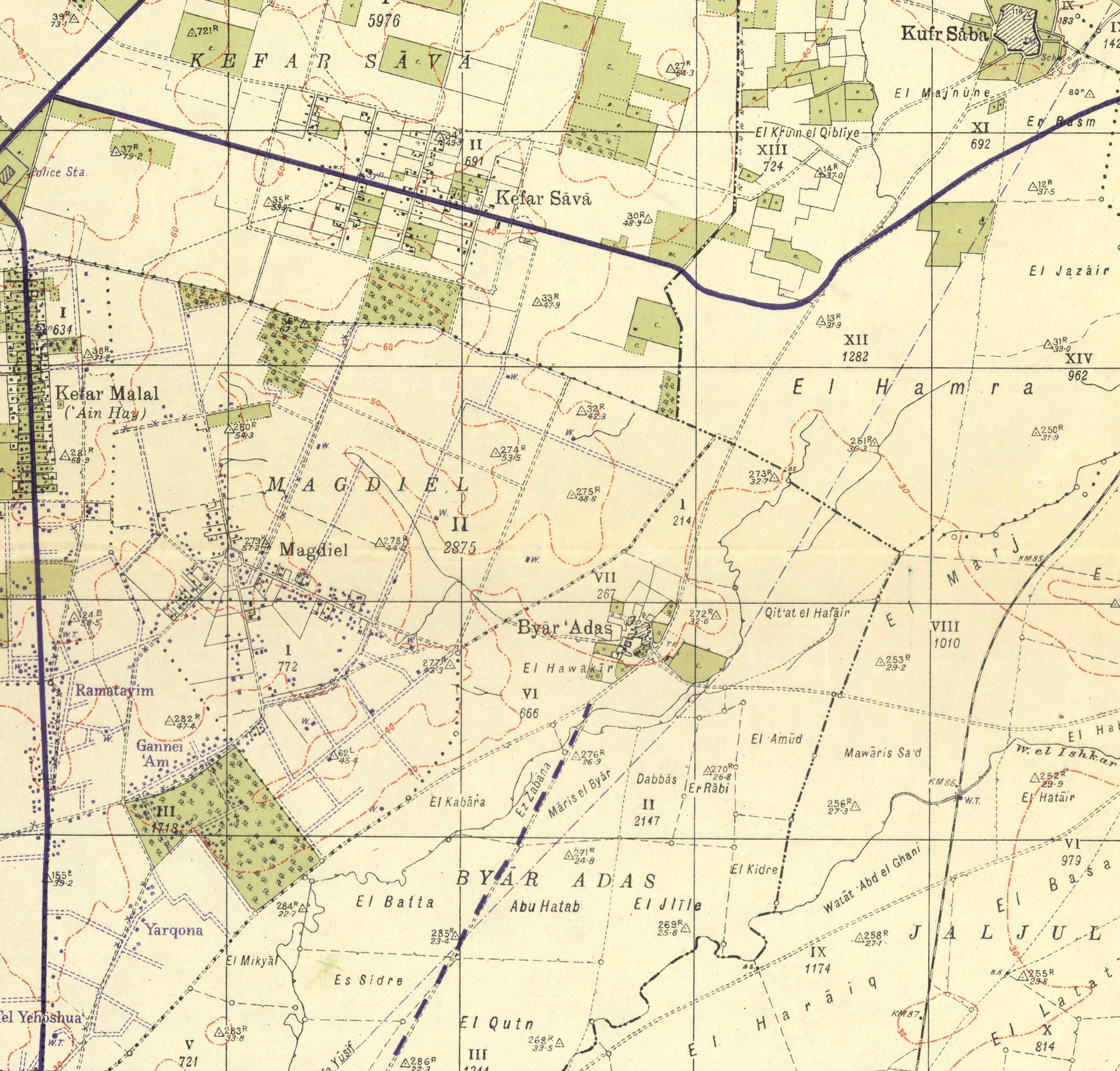
Ramatayim 1942 1:20,000

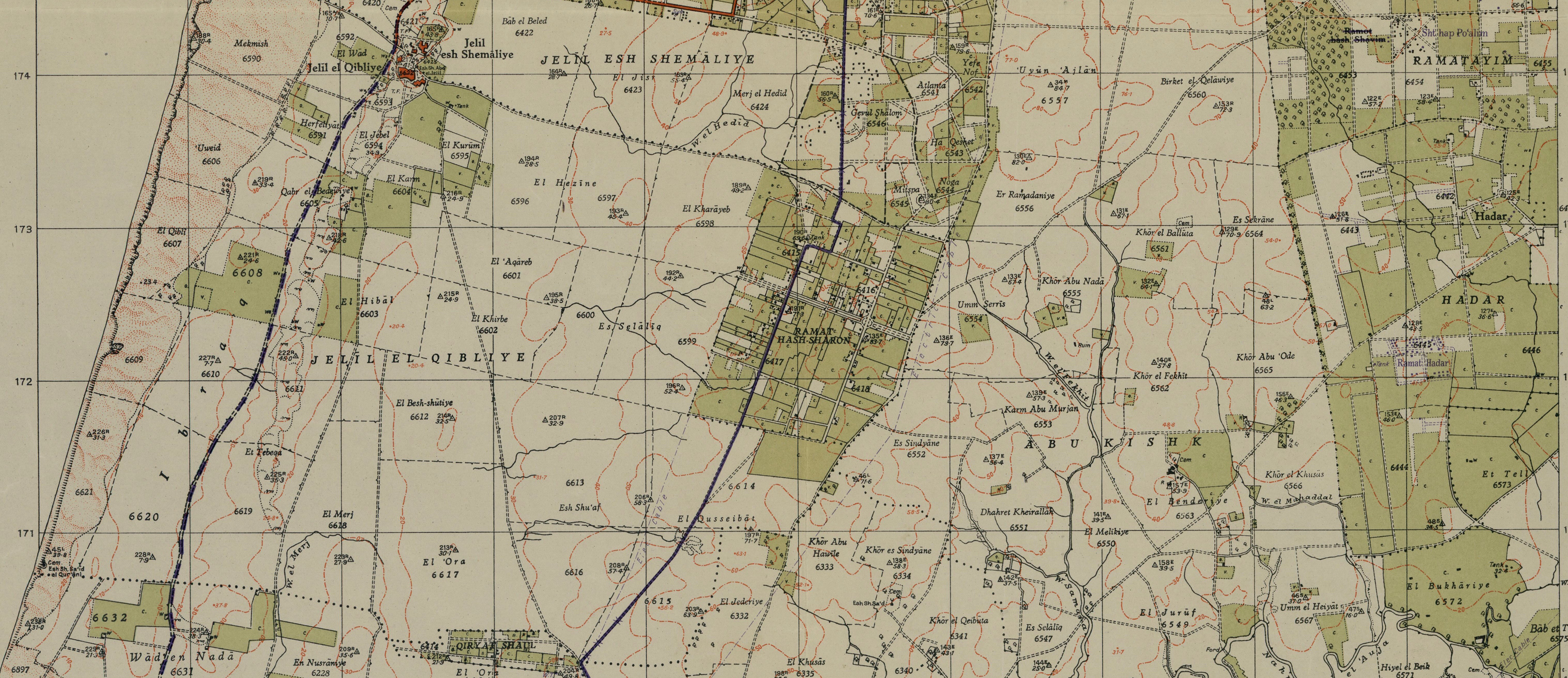
Hadar 1942 1:20,000

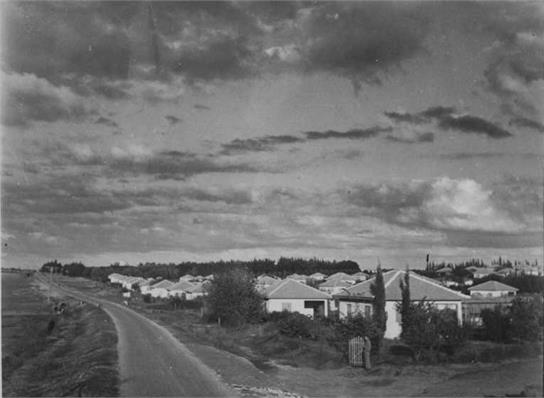
Ramatayim 1945

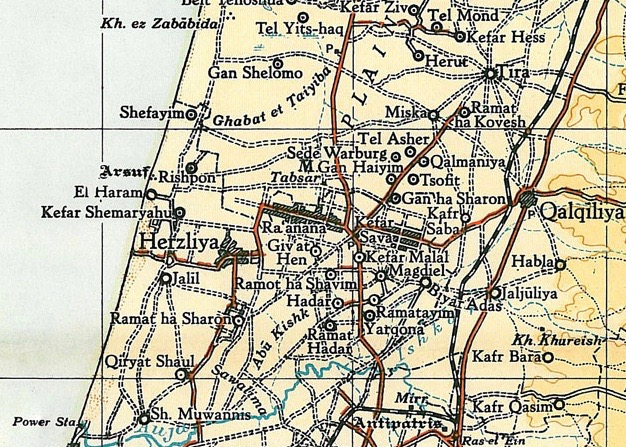
Hadar 1945 1:250,000

== Demographics ==
Year	Population
1972	14,000
1983	20,900
1995	29,000
2008	46,300
2022	65,020
2024	66,398

In 2006, the ethnic makeup of the city was 99.9% Jewish, with no significant Israeli Arab population. The population density of Hod HaSharon is the lowest in the Sharon Plain. The population growth rate in 2006 was 3.3%. According to the Israel Central Bureau of Statistics (CBS), as of 2005, there were 18,612 salaried workers and 2,006 are self-employed in the city.

=== Education ===
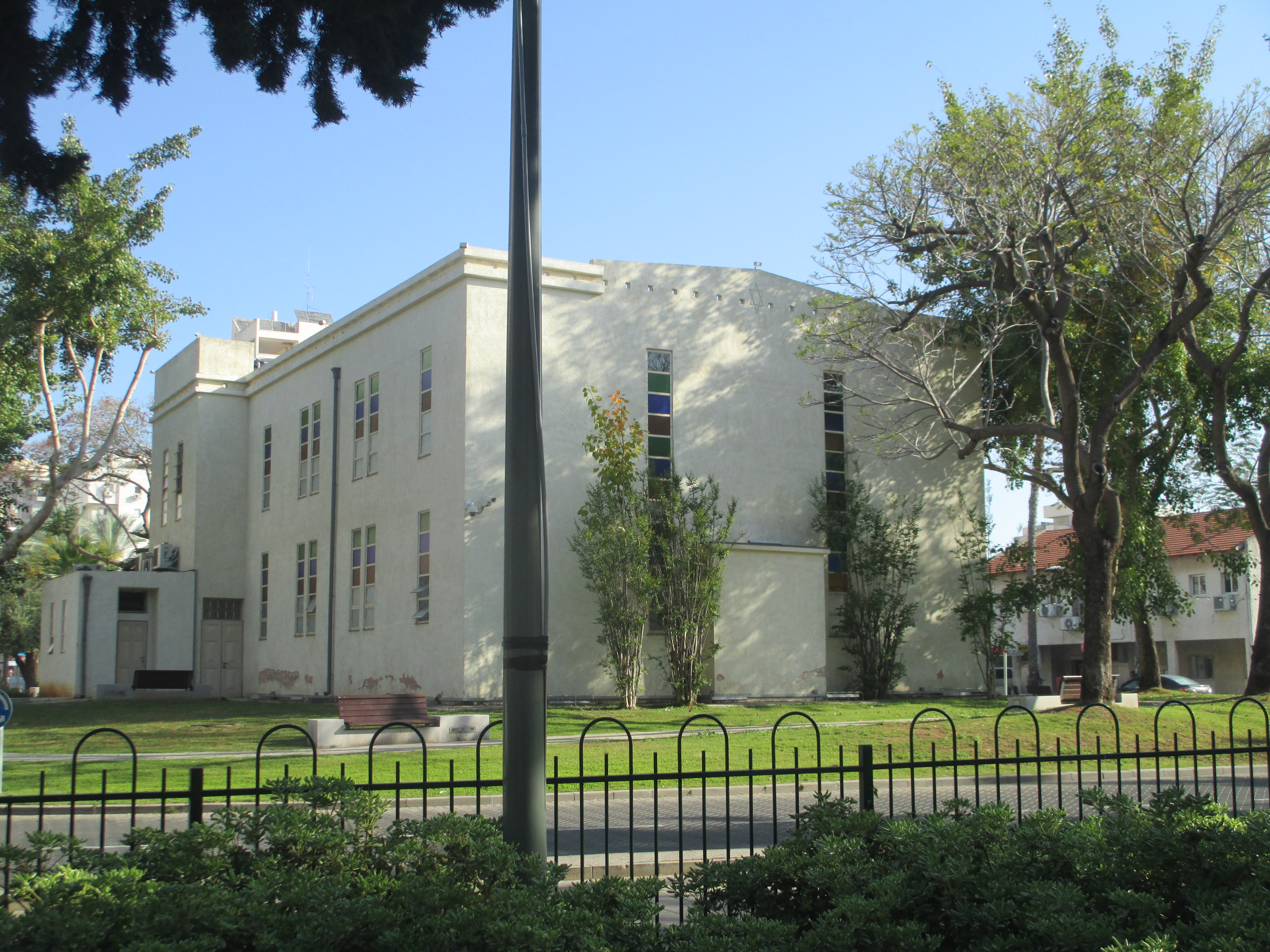
Magdiel Central synagogue

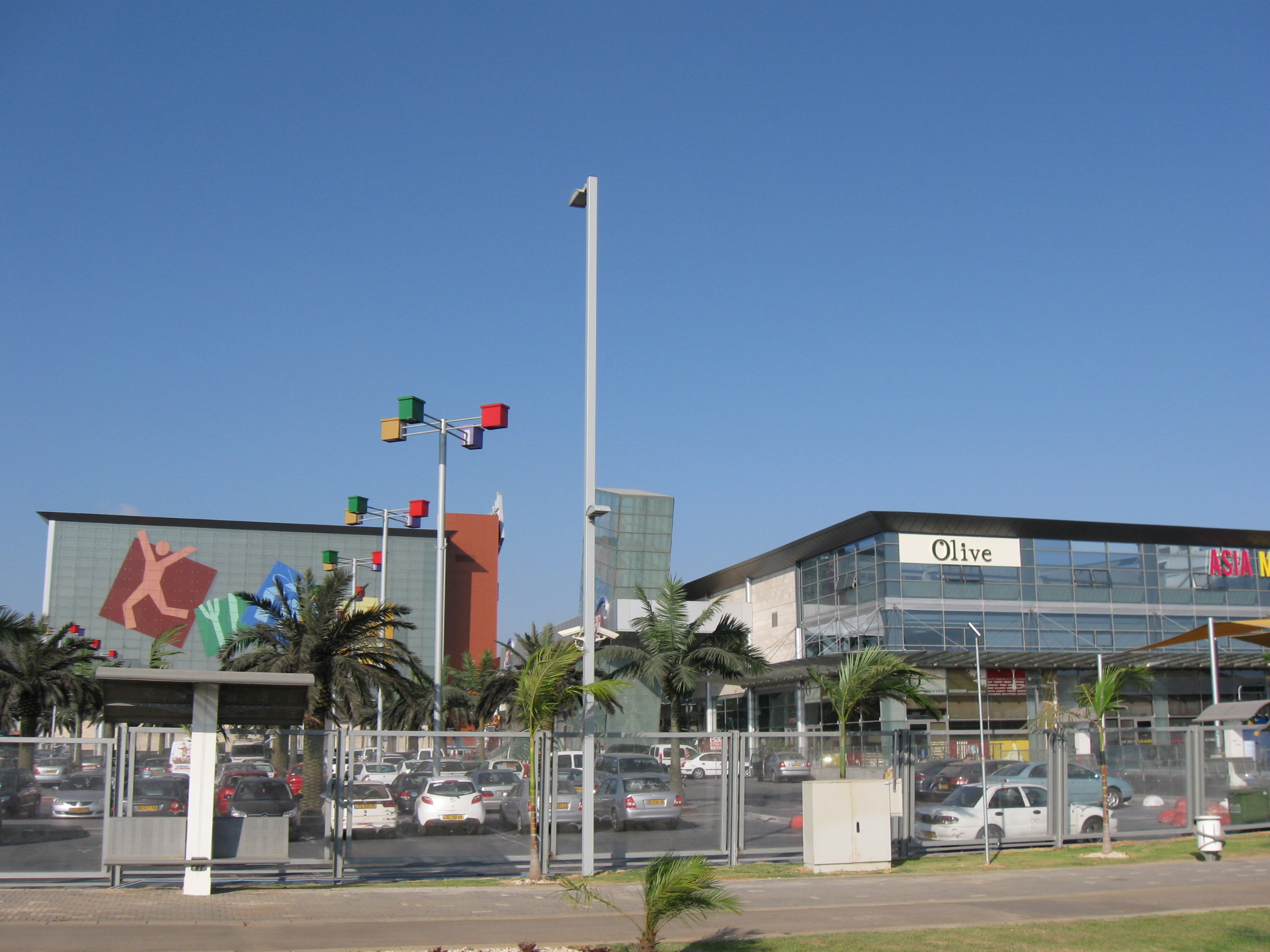
Sharonim Mall

According to the CBS, there are 18 schools and 8,083 students in the city: 12 elementary schools: The Democratic School, HaMagen, Yigal Alon, Lapid, Shilo, Mamlachti Alef, Neve Ne'eman, Rabin, Re'ut, Tali, Ha'Yarok in the name of Ariel Sharon, and Begin (4,406 students). 4 middle schools: HaRishonim, HaShachar, Atidim and Tzurim (1,628 students). A fifth middle school, HaShkimim opened in 2018. 5 high schools: Hadarim High School, Alexander Muss High School in Israel, Ramon, Mosenson and Na'amat (2,049 students). A sixth high school named HaShikmim was opened in 2021. 71.7% of the city's 12th graders were entitled to a matriculation certificate in 2001.

Mosenson Youth Village accepts both Israelis and overseas students. The Alexander Muss High School in Israel, run by the Jewish National Fund (JNF), offers a program for students all around the globe (primarily being from the United States and Canada) where the high school students spend two months to a full semester in Israel. Each year, the senior class of the Charles E. Smith Jewish Day School (located in Rockville, Maryland), and the junior class of Jack M. Barrack Hebrew Academy (located in Bryn Mawr, Pennsylvania) come to The Alexander Muss High School in Israel. Additionally, approximately half of the tenth grade class from the Milken Community High School in Los Angeles, come to Hod HaSharon to study for a semester in the Muss program.

== Transport ==
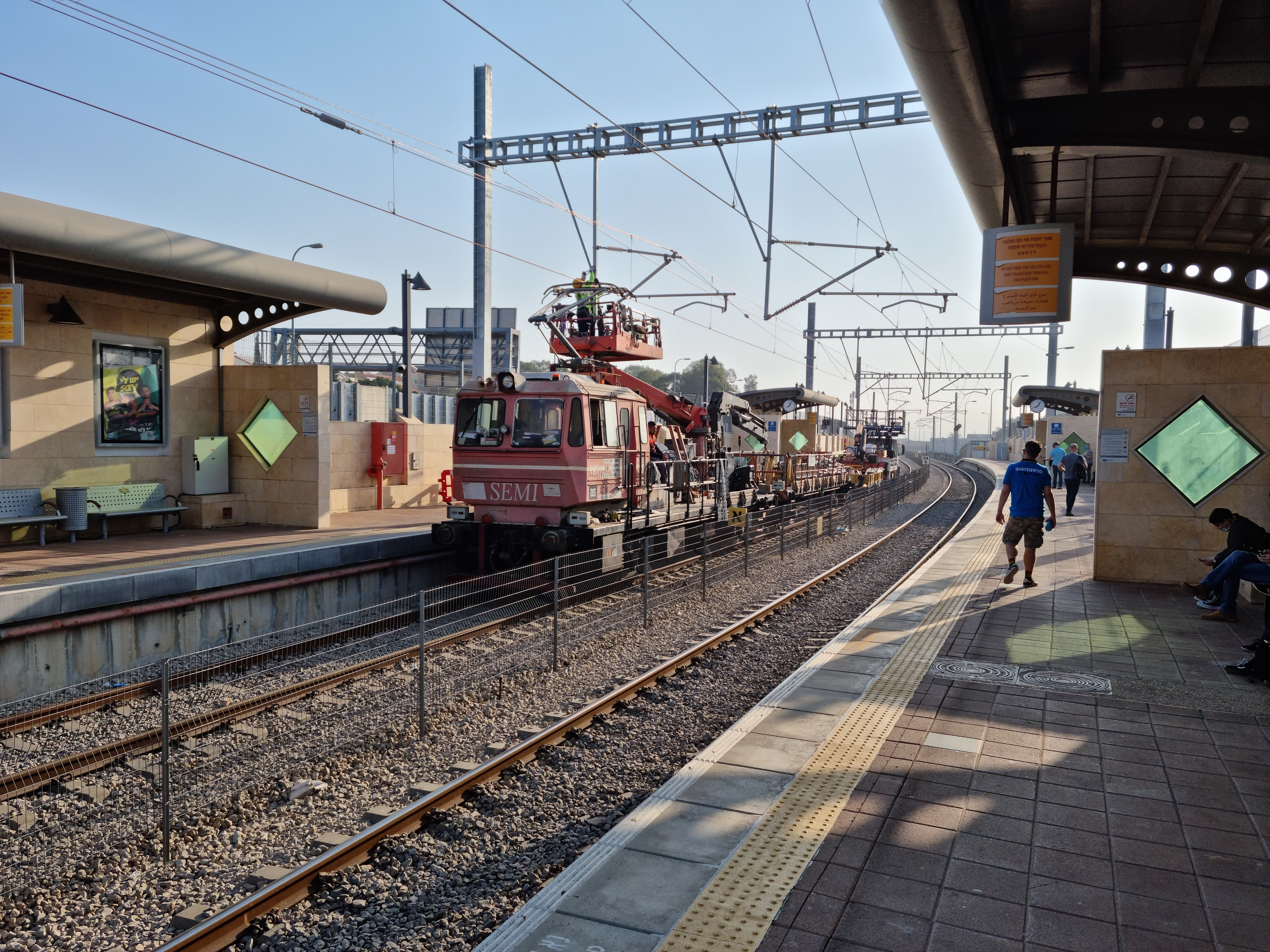
Sokolov railway station

Hod HaSharon is roughly bounded by Highway 531 in the north, Highway 40 in the east, Highway 5 in the south and Highway 4 in the west. Road 402 runs through the city. The city is served by two railway stations, Hod HaSharon–Sokolov and Kfar Saba–Nordau at its north border, right next to Highway 531. Line M1 of the Tel Aviv Metro, that is expected to be built in the 2030s, is expected to pass through western Hod HaSharon.

== Landmarks ==
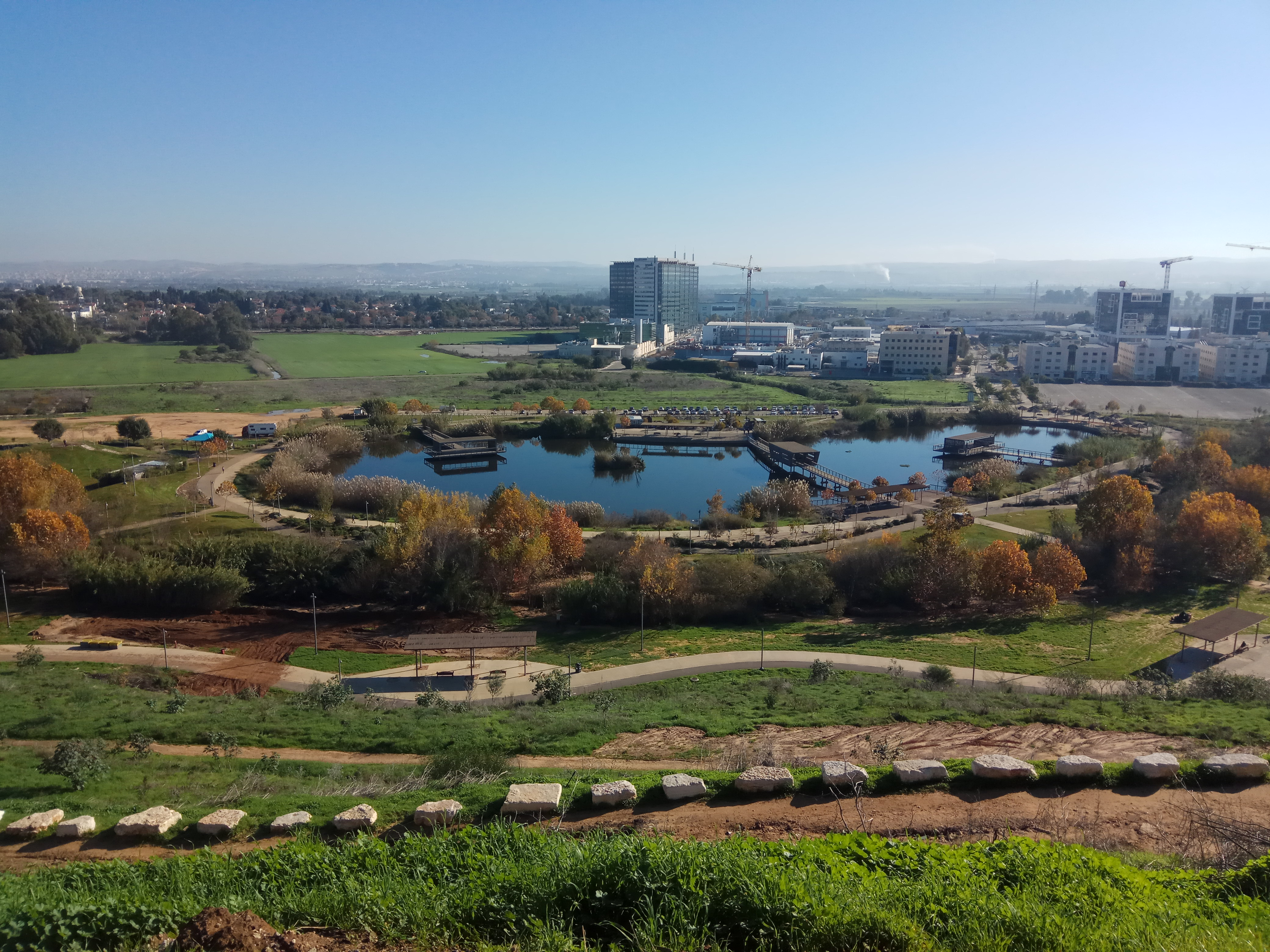
Hod HaSharon Park

Hod HaSharon Park is a park in southern Hod HaSharon. The park contains a hill, which was formerly used as the municipal landfill of the city, and is now used as a hiking and observation area of the park. From the top of the hill, one can see Hod HaSharon, Tel Aviv, the settlements of the Drom HaSharon Regional Council, Herzliya and Samaria.

Near the hill, the largest ecological lake in Israel was established, with an area of around 27,000m^{2}. Near the lake, there is a variety of waterfowl, herons, geese, ducks and songbirds. In the water. African softshell turtles, nutria and fish of various types have been observed.

== Voting Patterns ==
In the 2022 election, 71 percent of voters in Hod HaSharon voted for the parties of the center-left coalition led by Yair Lapid, while 26 percent voted for the parties of the right-wing coalition led by Benjamin Netanyahu and 0.3 percent voted for the Arab parties.

In the 2026 election, 74 percent of voters in Hod HaSharon voted for the parties of the center-left coalition led by Gadi Eisenkot, while 21 percent voted for the parties of the right-wing coalition led by Benjamin Netanyahu and 0.3 percent voted for the Arab parties. An additional 2.8 percent voted for the Reservists, and 1.3 percent voted for Amcha Yisrael. Voter turnout increased 16 percent from the 2022 election.

== Notable people ==
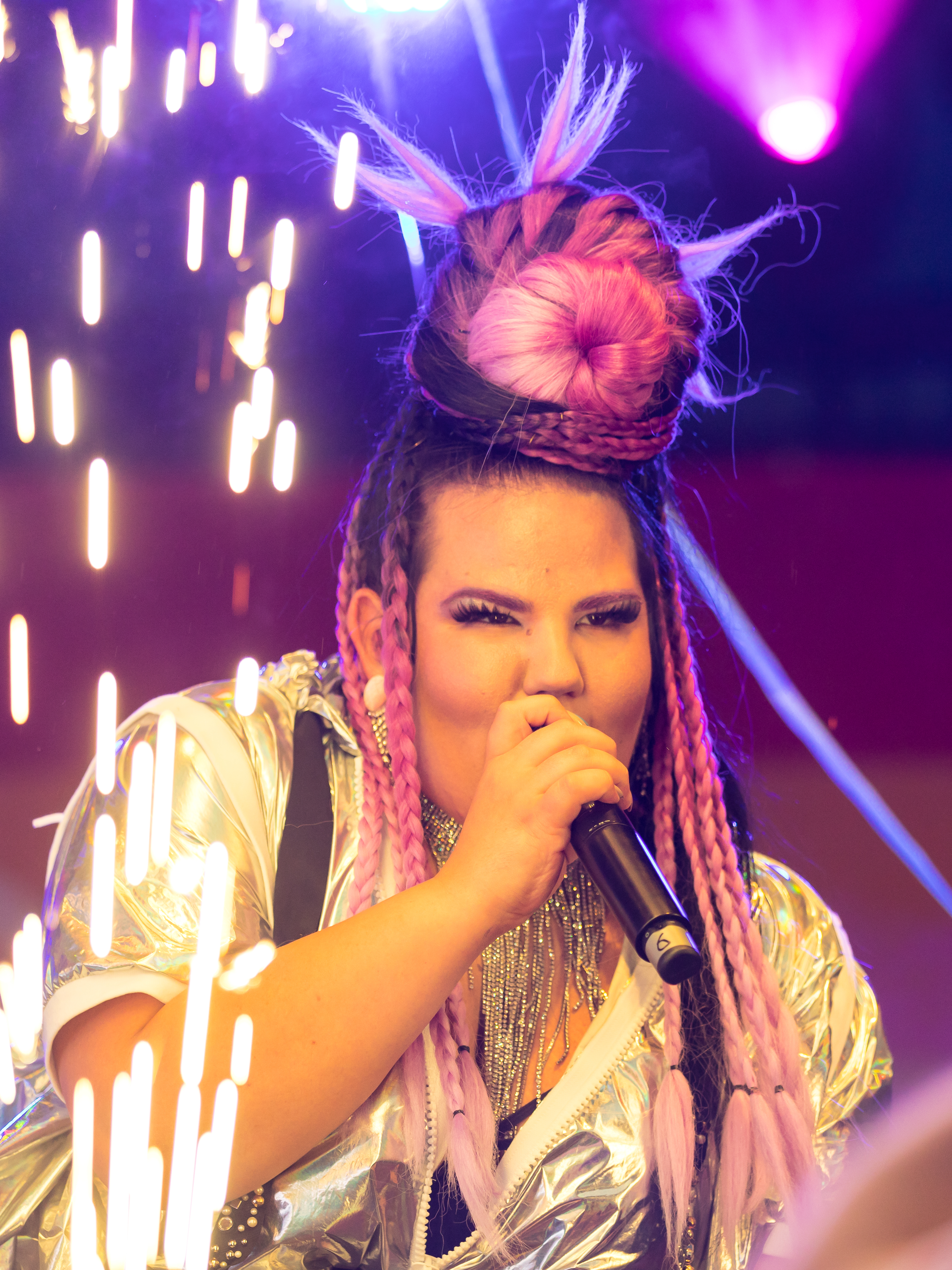
Netta Barzilai

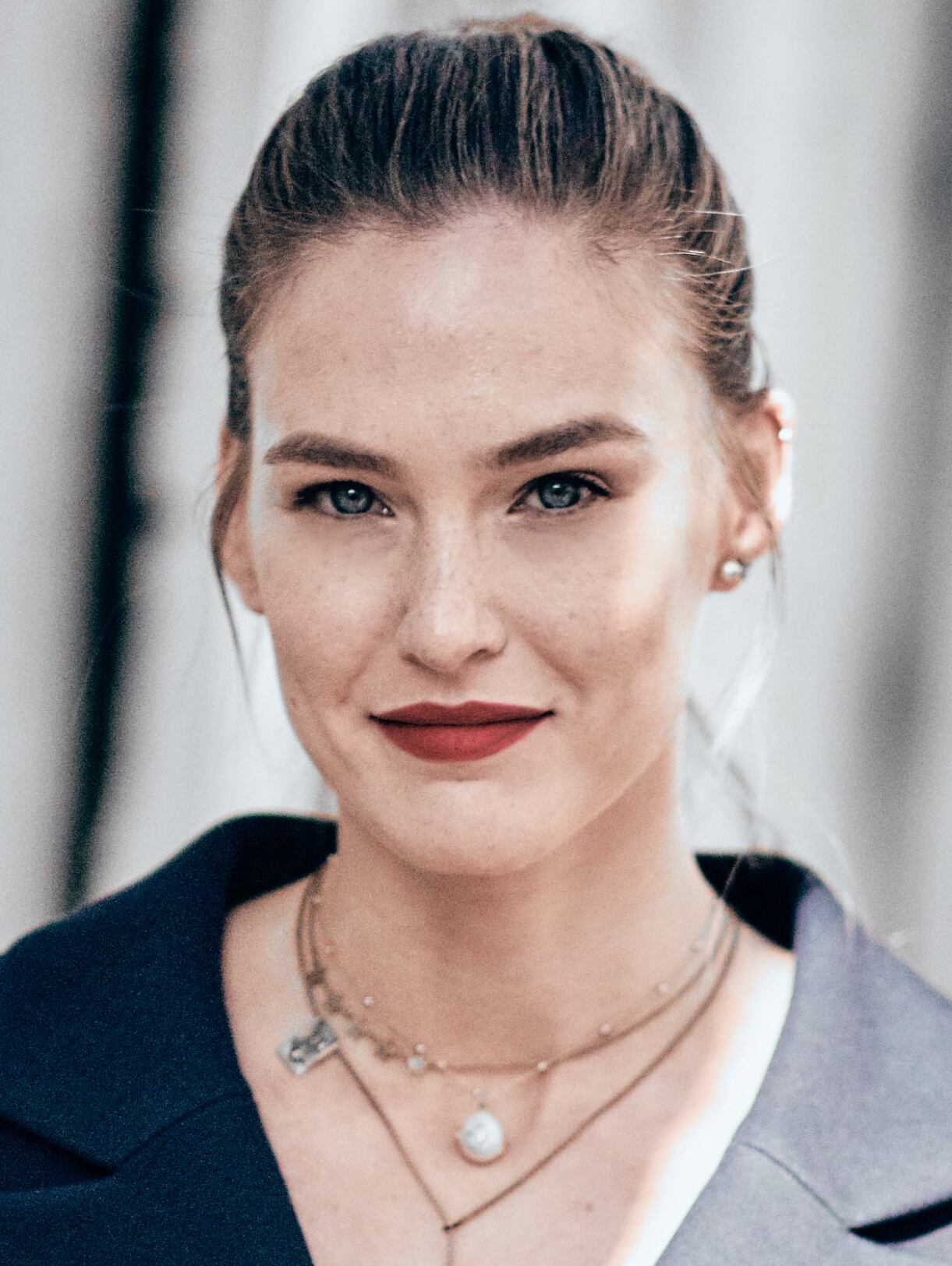
Bar Refaeli

- Netta Barzilai (born 1993); singer, songwriter and winner of the Eurovision Song Contest 2018
- Bar Refaeli (born 1985); supermodel, television host, actress and businesswoman
- Danny Ayalon (born 1955); politician and former Israeli ambassador to the United States
- Adi Altschuler (born 1986); educator and a social entrepreneur
- Ron Arad (born 1958); IAF weapon systems officer; classified as missing in action since 1986
- Shahar Biran (born 1998); tennis player
- Gal Cohen Groumi (born 2002); Olympic swimmer
- Dor Daniel (born 1982); singer and songwriter
- Gedalia Gal (born 1933); farmer and former politician and member of the Israeli Knesset
- Eliran George (born 1992); association footballer
- Esti Ginzburg (born 1985); model, television host and actress
- Shira Haas (born 1995), actress
- Imri Ziv (born 1991); singer, voice actor and Israeli Eurovision Song Contest 2017 entrant
- Keren Hadar (born 1975), crossover soprano singer
- Yifat Kariv (born 1973), member of the Israeli Knesset and social worker
- Keren Leibovitch (born 1973), champion Paralympic swimmer
- Yaniv Luzon (born 1981), association footballer
- Noam Mills (born 1986), female Israeli Olympic fencer
- Udi Spielman (born 1951); singer and hazzan
- Eliyahu Stoupel (1929-2022); prominent Lithuanian-Israeli cardiologist
- Ehud Tenenbaum (born 1979); software cracker nicknamed as "The Analyzer"
- Avihai Yadin (born 1986); association footballer

== Twin towns – sister cities ==
Hod HaSharon is twinned with:

- Dorsten, Germany
