= Magdiel =

Neighborhood of Hod Hasharon, Israel

Coordinates: 32.1613°N 34.9027°E

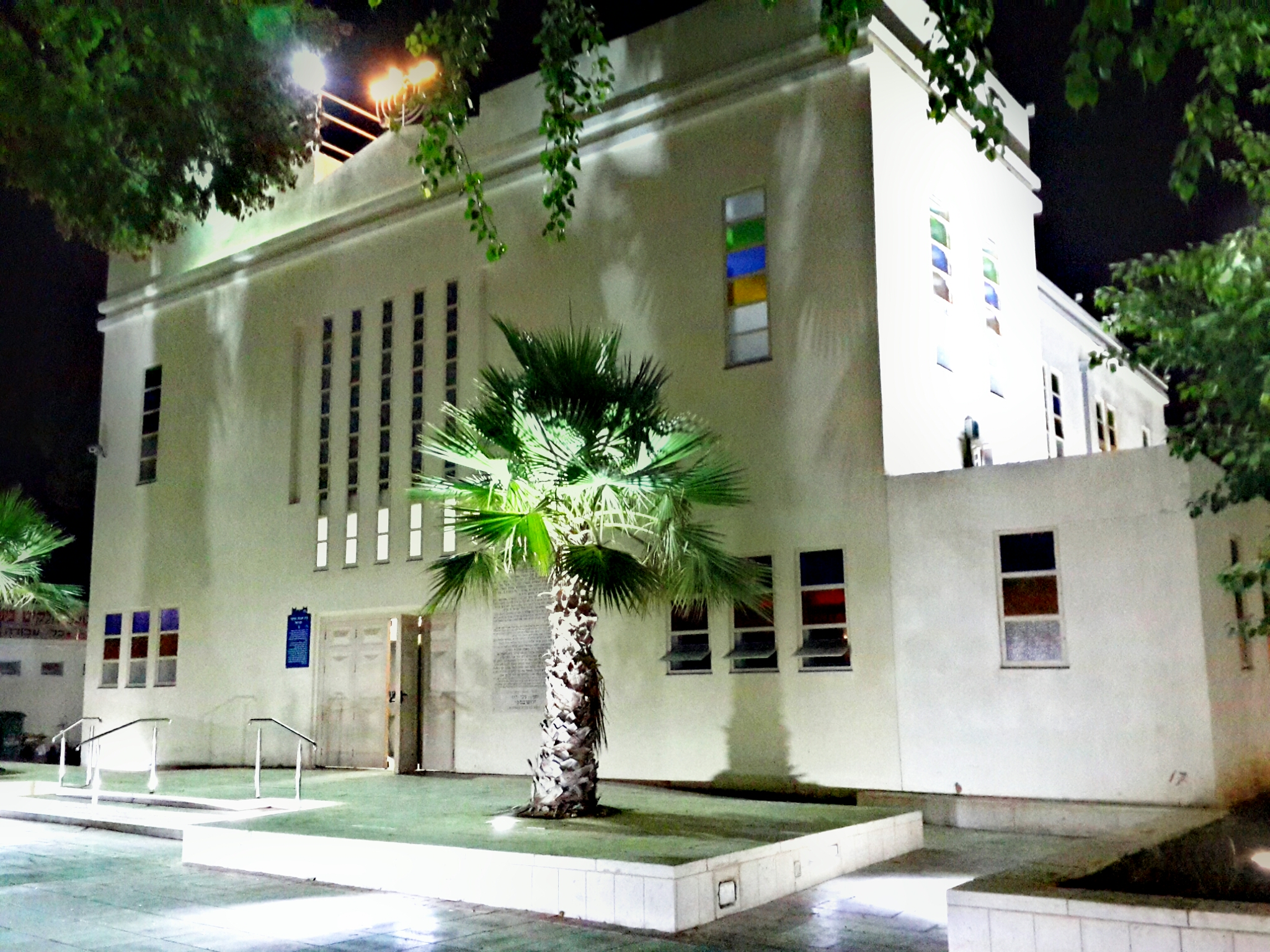
Central synagogue of Magdiel

Magdiel (Hebrew: מגדיאל) is one of the four original communities of Jewish farmers who combined in 1964 to form Hod Hasharon, Israel. It was founded in 1924 and according to a census conducted in 1931 by the British Mandate authorities had a population of 740.

== History ==
Before the 20th century, the site of Magdiel formed part of the Forest of Sharon, a hallmark of the region's historical landscape. It was an open woodland dominated by Mount Tabor Oak (Quercus ithaburensis), which extended from Kfar Yona in the north to Ra'anana in the south. The local Arab inhabitants traditionally used the area for pasture, firewood, and intermittent cultivation. The intensification of settlement and agriculture in the coastal plain during the 19th century led to deforestation and subsequent environmental degradation known from Hebrew sources.

Magdiel was established as a moshava, starting on 4,000 dunams of land purchased near the Arab village of Biyar 'Adas. The initial population included Jewish immigrants from Russia, Poland and Lithuania, later joined by a group from the Netherlands. In 1964, four villages – Magdiel, Ramatayim, Hadar, and Ramat Hadar – merged to become Hod Hasharon.

The Magdiel Central Synagogue was built between 1930 and 1944, and was inaugurated in an uncompleted stage in 1931. In the run up to independence the synagogue served as a Haganah headquarters. In 2009 a small Haganah weapons cache dating back to the 1948 war was found at the synagogue.

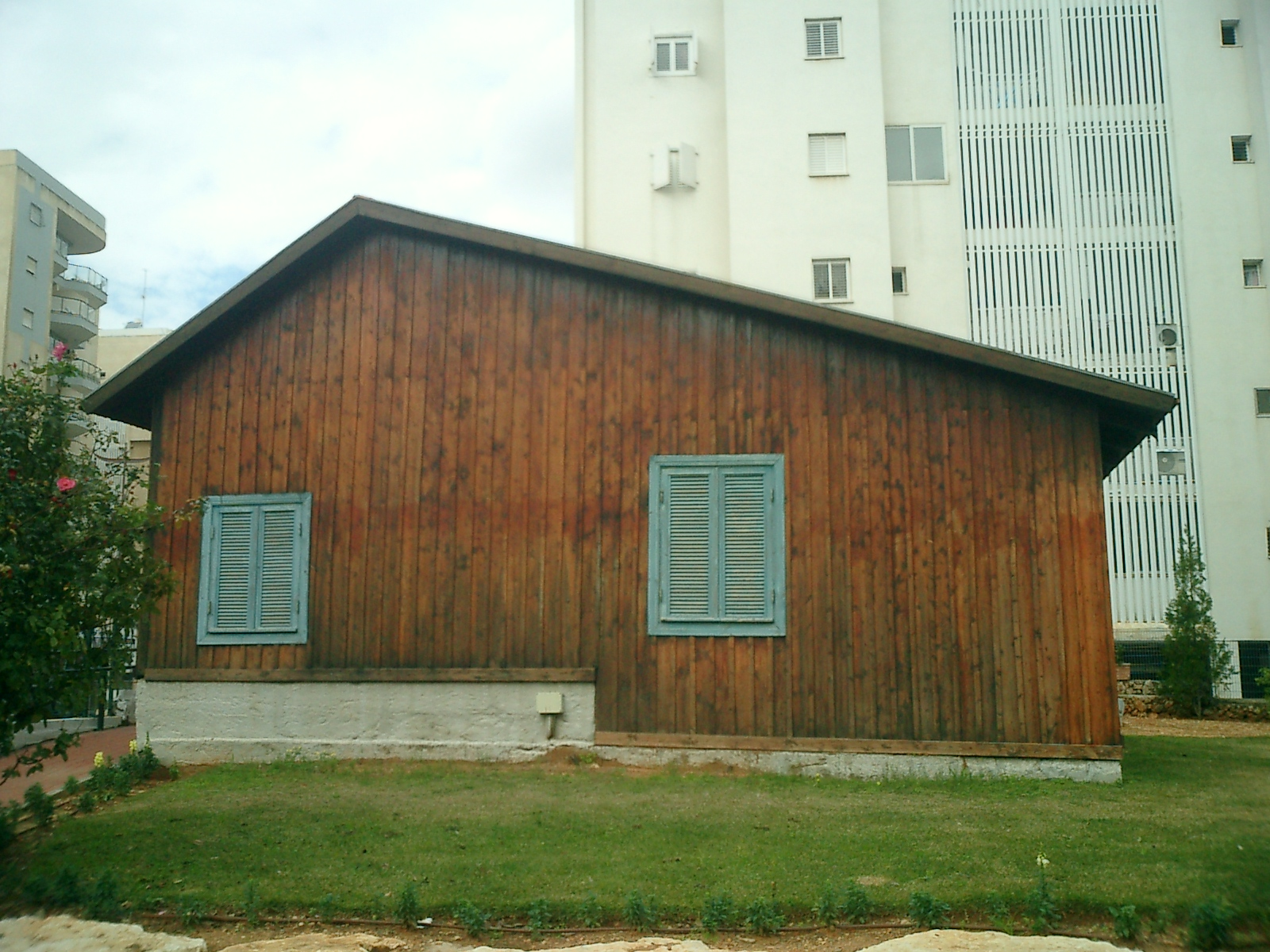
Restored hut of Magdiel pioneers

The place name is symbolic Meged El (i.e., the oil of God)" and appears in the Tanach/Old Testament. Magdiel was the name of an Edomite clan (possibly the name of an eponymous chieftain) mentioned in Genesis 36:43. Its invocation of El may show that that deity was worshipped in Edom, along with Kaus and others.

Magdiel is the location of a Youth Aliyah boarding school of that name that took in young survivors of the Holocaust. Other schools there include a comprehensive secondary school and a technical vocational boarding school of the ORT educational network.

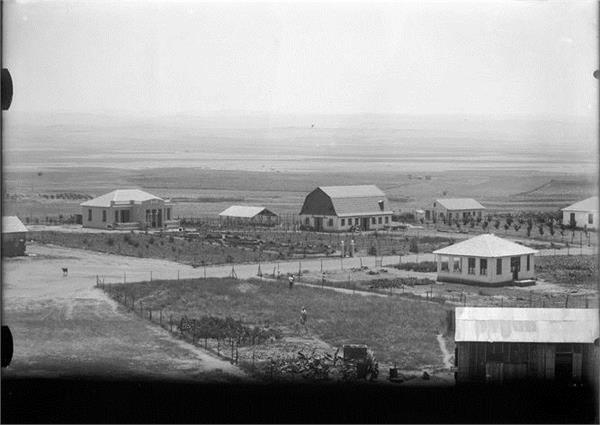
Magdiel 1927

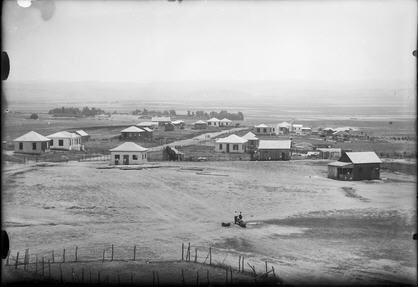
Magdiel 1927

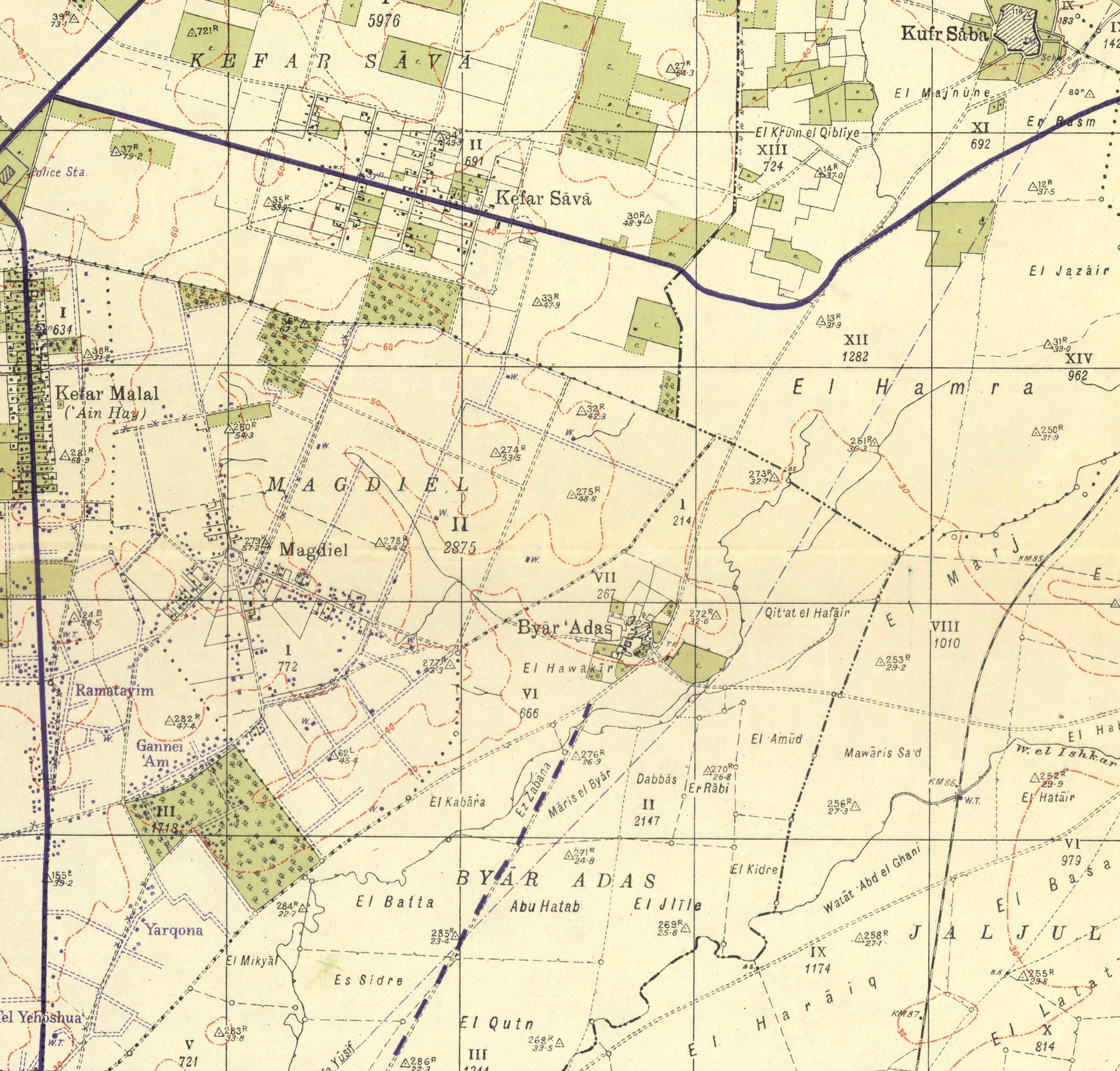
Magdiel 1942 1:20,000

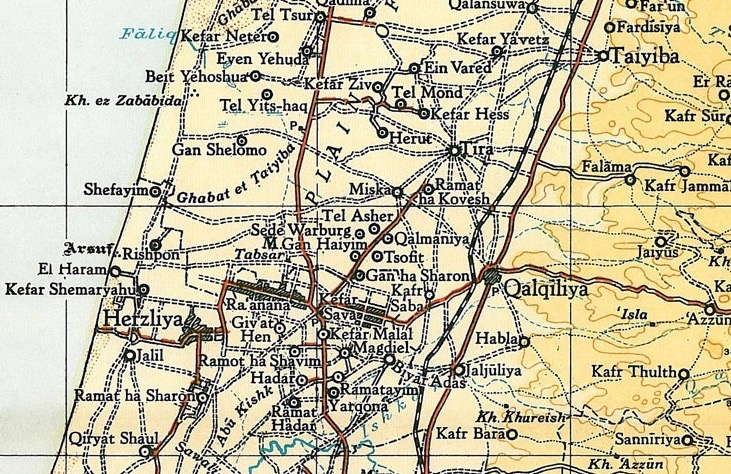
Magdiel 1945 1:250,000

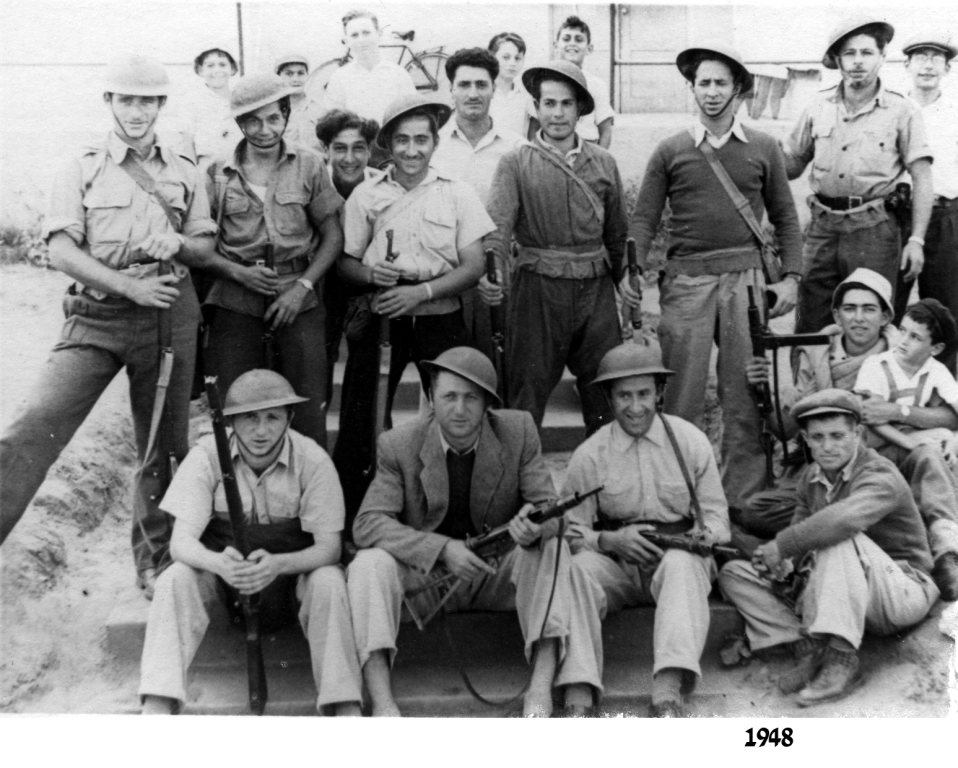
Magdiel soldiers during the 1948 Arab–Israeli War
