= Mosenson Youth Village =

Youth village in Hod HaSharon, Israel

The Mosenson Youth Village is a youth village in Hod HaSharon, Israel. The youth village was named after Ben Zion Mossensohn, a teacher, public figure and one of the founders of Tel Aviv.

== History ==
Mosinzon school was established as a school for agriculture, and was part of a network of schools of the Zionist Youth Movement. Its goal was to teach the young immigrants (olim) arriving from the diaspora, along with Israeli youth from around the country, for life of labor, creativity and self-fulfillment, in science, technology, arts and sports. To this end, a boarding school was established, and exists until these days, as part of the youth village.

By the end of World War II, the youth village received young Holocaust survivors who immigrated to Israel. In 1943 the first class of the survivors graduated.

Comprehensive studies started in 1967 in collaboration with the local municipality of Hod-Hasharon.

== Academics ==
Currently the youth village consists of a high-school and a boarding school. The school hosts the children of the local communities, and offers technological and comprehensive studies. Its present principal is Rami Egozi.

The school was awarded by the Ministry of Education best absorption of new education workers in 2015–16. In addition, it received the Education Award for cultural collaboration from the Teachers' Association.

The boarding school admits students from all around Israel as well as students from abroad. It is considered to be one of the leading boarding schools in Israel, and recently has received Best Boarding School Education Award.

Mosenson high school offers a variety of unique classes, including sports – such as dancing, swimming, basketball, football and personal sports. It also offers classes of biomedicine, electronics, film, Nachshon Program and general studies.

Students of the Naale program, from North America, Europe, South Africa, and other countries study at the youth village, where there is also a special program for students who do not speak Hebrew, to enable them to become part of the Israeli society.

== Notable persons ==
- Gal Cohen Groumi (born 2002), Olympic swimmer
