= Biyar 'Adas =

Depopulated village in Mandatory Palestine

Biyar 'Adas بِيار عدس Bir Adas
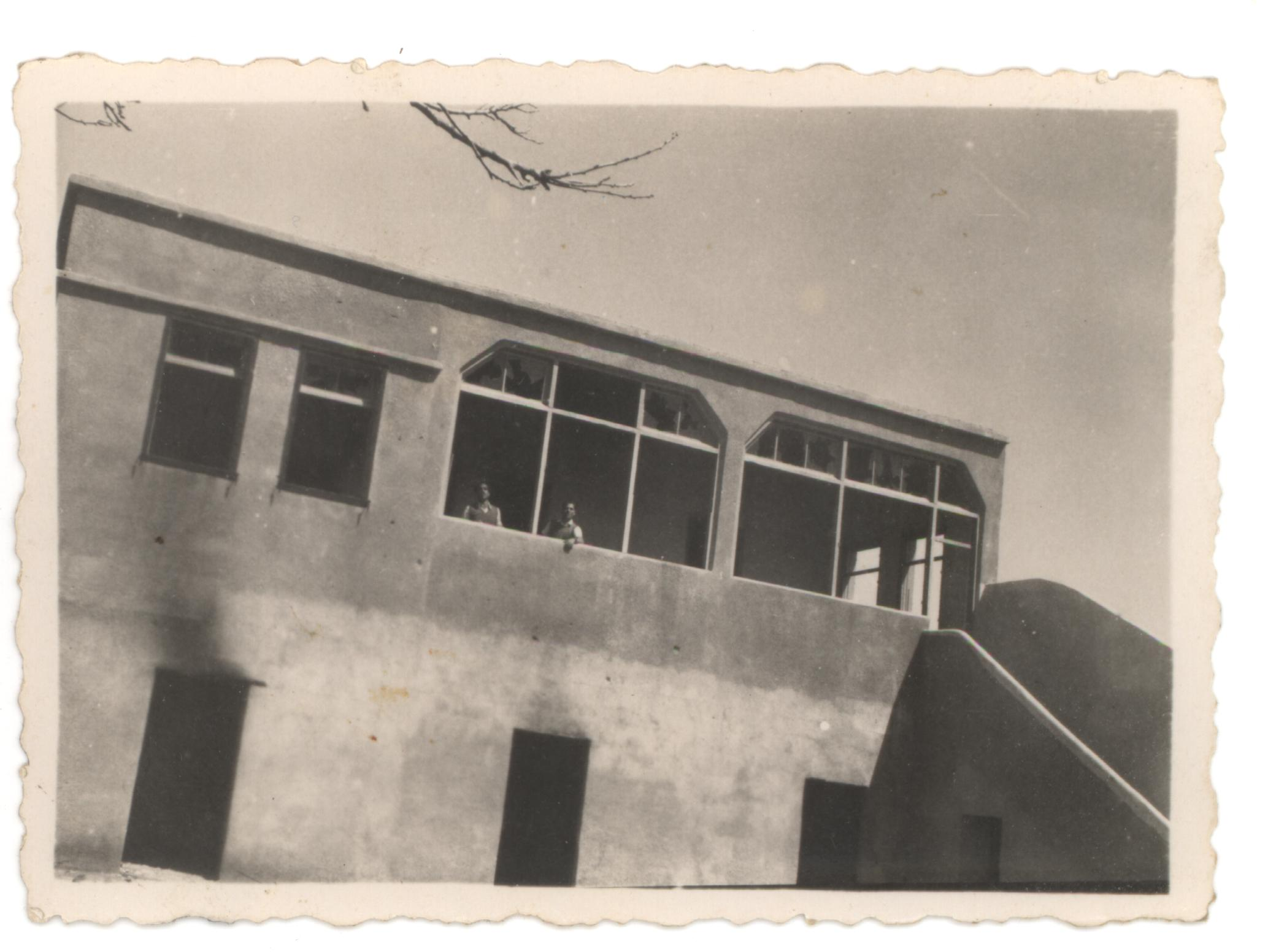
- "Shanti" house, ca 1948
- Etymology: "The well of lentils"
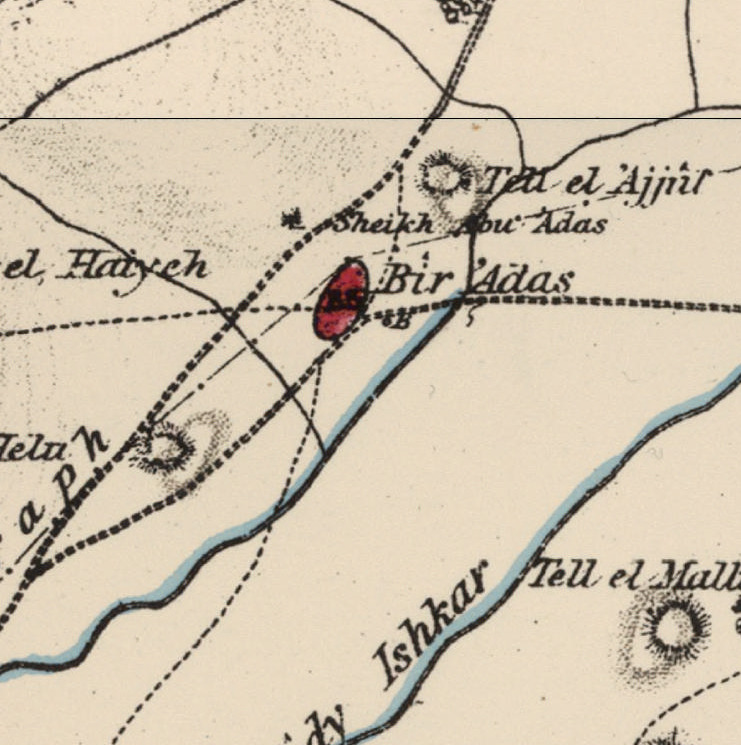
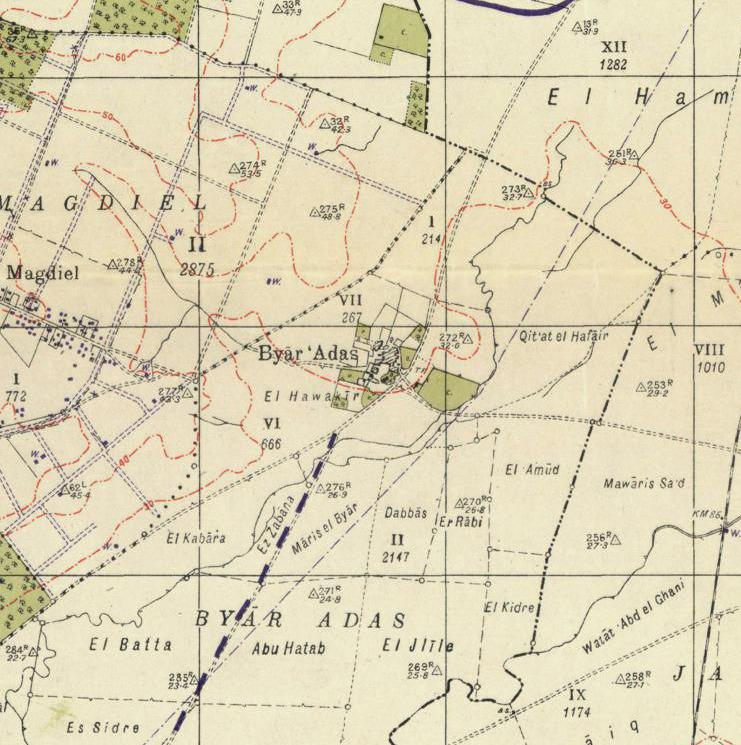
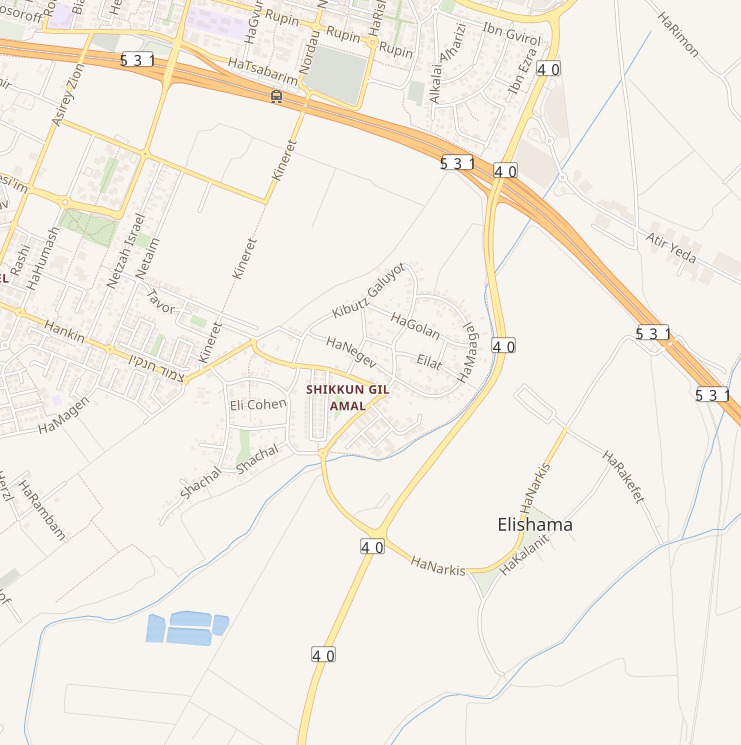
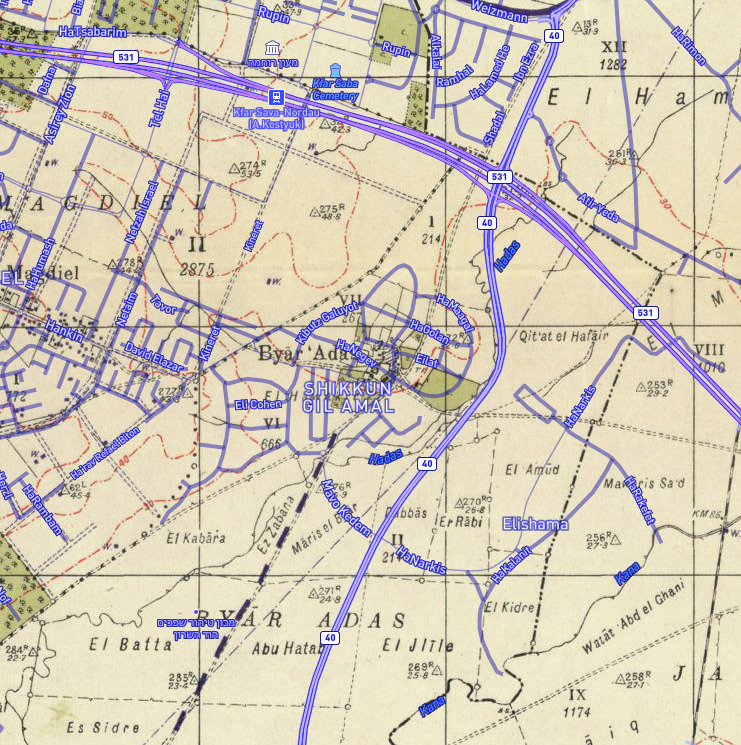
- 1870s map 1940s map modern map 1940s with modern overlay map A series of historical maps of the area around Biyar 'Adas (click the buttons)

- Location within Mandatory Palestine
- Coordinates: 32°09′27″N 34°55′15″E
- Palestine grid: 142/173
- Geopolitical entity: Mandatory Palestine
- Subdistrict: Jaffa
- Date of depopulation: April 12, 1948

Area
  - Total: 5,492 dunams (5.492 km^{2}; 2.120 sq mi)

Population (1945)
  - Total: 300
- Cause(s) of depopulation: Military assault by Yishuv forces
- Current Localities: Adanim, Elishama

Biyar 'Adas (Arabic: بِيار عدس) was a Palestinian Arab village located 19 km northeast of the city of Tel Aviv. In 1945 the village had a population of 300 and a total land area of 5,492 dunums.

== History ==
=== Ottoman Empire ===
In 1856 the village was named Bir 'Adas on Kiepert's map of Palestine published that year.

In 1870 Victor Guérin noted it as located on a small height, and an Ottoman village list from about the same year showed that Bijar 'Adas had a population of 198 in a total of 60 houses, though that population count included men, only. It was further noted that the name meant "The cistern of lentils".

In 1882, the PEF's Survey of Western Palestine (SWP) described Biyar 'Adas as a village built of adobe bricks, with a well to the east.

=== British Mandate era ===
In the 1922 census of Palestine, conducted by the British Mandate authorities, Biar Adas had a population of 87, all Muslims, increasing in the 1931 census to 161, still all Muslim, in a total of 28 houses.

In the early hours of May 29, 1939, 25 members of the Irgun led by Moshe Moldovsky attacked Biyar 'Adas on the grounds that its residents were harboring what they have seen as "gangs". The members of the unit were instructed to avoid harming women, children and the elderly. They forced their way into two houses and shot dead one man and four women. Two men and a girl were wounded. In a letter, Ze'ev Jabotinsky ordered the Irgun command to punish those responsible for shooting women, and to report to him what the punishment was, if indeed those reports were true. Nobody was punished.

In the 1945 statistics the village had a total of 1,604 dunums of land used for citrus and bananas, 3,413 dunums to cereals, 181 dunums were irrigated or used for orchards, while 14 dunams were classified as built-up areas.

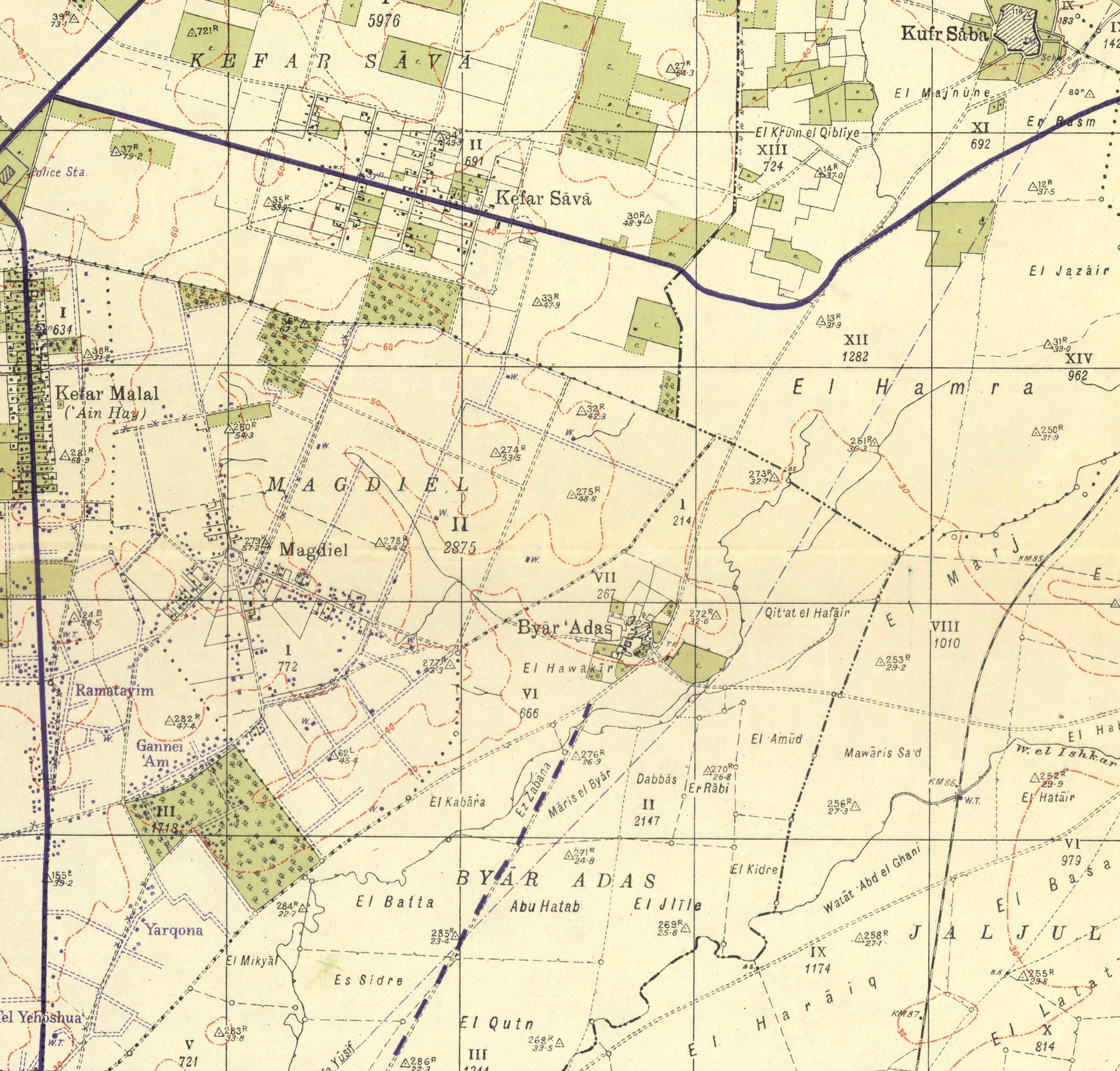
Biyar 'Adas 1942 1:20,000

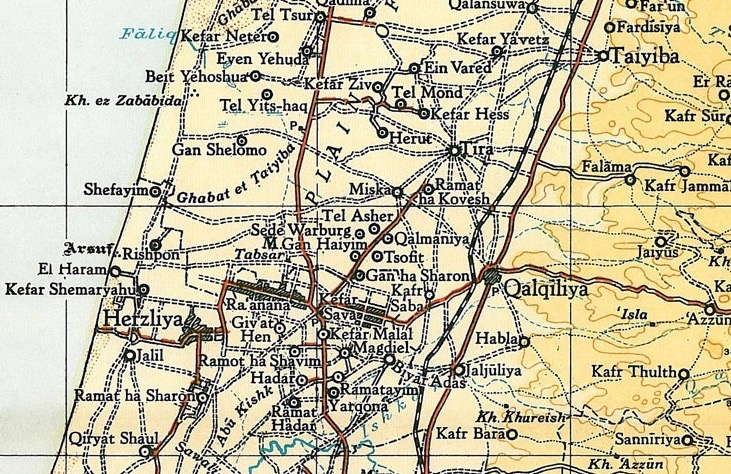
Biyar 'Adas 1945 1:250,000

=== 1948 and aftermath ===
On January 19, 1948, the elders of Biyar Adas warned the inhabitants of the nearby Jewish settlement of Magdiel to be on guard against assaults. On February 27 that year, a farmer from Magdiel was killed in an ambush by Arab militants while working in fields near Magdiel. A Israel Defense Forces force from the 32nd Battalion of the Alexandroni Brigade arrived to the scene of the shooting, spotted militants retreating towards Bir Adas, and opened fire on the village. Following the shooting, on March 2 1948, Iraqi troops, who were headed by Fawzi al-Qawuqji, were called to Biyar Adas and attacked Magdiel. Fire and sniping took place daily for about a week. Company B of the 32nd Battalion of the Alexandroni Brigade attempted to hit Arab positions, as additional Arab forces were concentrated in Bir Adas. A prolonged battle ensued, which ended with withdrawal of the Arab troops and a ceasefire, brokered on 9 March 1948 by the Arab notable Tawfiq Abu Kishk.

The village became depopulated after an assault by the Lehi, an offshoot of the Irgun on April 12, 1948. Later that year, Yosef Weitz set about levelling Biyar 'Adas.

After the war the area was incorporated into the State of Israel. The moshav of Adanim was established on village land, southwest of the village site, in 1950. In 1951 another moshav, Elishama, was built on land that had belonged to Biyar 'Adas.

Khalidi described the place in 1992:

The site is marked by cactuses, fig trees, palm trees, and the debris of houses. Some houses and sections of houses that were built among citrus groves still stand, deserted, amidst wild vegetation. All are made of concrete and possess a variety of architectural designs, ranging from the elaborate to the simple. Their roofs are flat, slanted, or gabled, and their doors and windows are rectangular. The land in the vicinity is cultivated and is covered in places by Israeli fruit orchards.

== See also ==
- Depopulated Palestinian locations in Israel
- List of villages depopulated during the Arab–Israeli conflict

== Bibliography ==
- Barron, J.B., ed. (1923). Palestine: Report and General Abstracts of the Census of 1922. Government of Palestine.
- Conder, C.R.; Kitchener, H.H. (1882). The Survey of Western Palestine: Memoirs of the Topography, Orography, Hydrography, and Archaeology. Vol. 2. London: Committee of the Palestine Exploration Fund.
- Department of Statistics (1945). Village Statistics, April, 1945. Government of Palestine.
- Guérin, V. (1875). Description Géographique Historique et Archéologique de la Palestine (in French). Vol. 2: Samarie, pt. 2. Paris: L'Imprimerie Nationale.
- Hadawi, S. (1970). Village Statistics of 1945: A Classification of Land and Area ownership in Palestine. Palestine Liberation Organization Research Center.
- Hartmann, M. (1883). "Die Ortschaftenliste des Liwa Jerusalem in dem türkischen Staatskalender für Syrien auf das Jahr 1288 der Flucht (1871)". Zeitschrift des Deutschen Palästina-Vereins. 6: 102–149.
- Khalidi, W. (1992). All That Remains: The Palestinian Villages Occupied and Depopulated by Israel in 1948. Washington D.C.: Institute for Palestine Studies. ISBN 0-88728-224-5.
- Mills, E, ed. (1932). Census of Palestine 1931. Population of Villages, Towns and Administrative Areas. Jerusalem: Government of Palestine.
- Morris, B. (2004). The Birth of the Palestinian Refugee Problem Revisited. Cambridge University Press. ISBN 978-0-521-00967-6.
- Palmer, E.H. (1881). The Survey of Western Palestine: Arabic and English Name Lists Collected During the Survey by Lieutenants Conder and Kitchener, R. E. Transliterated and Explained by E.H. Palmer. Committee of the Palestine Exploration Fund.
- Socin, A. (1879). "Alphabetisches Verzeichniss von Ortschaften des Paschalik Jerusalem". Zeitschrift des Deutschen Palästina-Vereins. 2: 135–163.
