= Fourth Aliyah =

1924-1928 Wave of Jewish Immigration to Mandatory Palestine from Europe

The Fourth Aliyah (Hebrew: העלייה הרביעית, romanized: HaAliyah HaRevi'it') refers to the fourth wave of the Jewish immigration to Mandatory Palestine, mainly from Europe, between 1924 and 1928.

== The character of the Fourth Aliyah ==
Starting around 1924 the character and the composition of the immigration to Palestine changed, and even though this immigration wave was very close to the previous immigration wave, it has been categorized as separate.

That wave brought rapid urban development, particularly in Tel Aviv, which absorbed a considerable number of the immigrants. But during the years 1926–1927 an economic crisis occurred in the country, the toughest the Jewish settlement had during the period of the British Mandate of Palestine, and in spite of the economic comeback between 1928–1929, the crisis was identified with all of the period of the Fourth immigration. In the period of the crisis about 23,000 immigrants decided to leave the country. In February 1924 David Ben Gurion wrote in his diary: "The lack of work is ever increasing. Yesterday people were fainting in the office." Later in the year he noted "The people are hungry and cannot work." 7,400 Jews left Palestine in 1926. In 1927 the Zionist Executive funded an employment program for 8,000 workers. In 1928 emigration equalled immigration.

In the fourth Aliyah about 80,000 immigrants came to Palestine, mainly from the countries of Eastern Europe, half of the immigrants from Poland and the rest from the Soviet Union, Romania and Lithuania. In addition to that 12% of all immigrants were from the Middle East, mainly Yemen and Iraq.

== The causes for the immigration ==
The major push factors for Jewish emigration from Europe at this time were a rise in antisemitism throughout Europe and an economic crisis in Poland. With the passage of the Emergency Quota Act and 1924 Immigration Act in the United States, heavy restrictions on Jewish immigration were imposed. As a result, many Jews decided to move to Palestine instead. This group contained many middle class families which had engaged in business, industry, trade. They primarily moved to the growing cities, establishing small businesses and light industry.
