= Swimming at the 2012 European Aquatics Championships – Men's 100 metre backstroke =

Men's 100 metre backstroke at the 2012 European Aquatics Championships
- Dates: May 21, 2012 (heats and semifinals); May 22, 2012 (final)
- Competitors: 43 from 24 nations
- Winning time: 53.86

Medalists
gold medal	Aristeidis Grigoriadis	Greece
silver medal	Helge Meeuw	Germany
bronze medal	Yakov-Yan Toumarkin	Israel

The men's 100 metre backstroke competition of the swimming events at the 2012 European Aquatics Championships took place May 21 and 22. The heats and semifinals took place on May 21, the final on May 22.

== Records ==
Prior to the competition, the existing world, European and championship records were as follows.

	Name	Nation	Time	Location	Date
World record	Aaron Peirsol	United States	51.94	Indianapolis	July 8, 2009
European record Championship record	Camille Lacourt	France	52.11	Budapest	August 10, 2010

== Results ==
=== Heats ===
43 swimmers participated in 6 heats.

Rank	Heat	Lane	Name	Nationality	Time	Notes
1	4	6	Yakov-Yan Toumarkin	Israel	54.22	Q, =NR
2	6	3	Guy Barnea	Israel	54.44	Q
3	4	4	Aristeidis Grigoriadis	Greece	54.45	Q
4	5	3	Jonatan Kopelev	Israel	54.61	
5	4	5	Mirco di Tora	Italy	54.77	Q
6	5	4	Helge Meeuw	Germany	54.78	Q
7	5	5	Vitaly Borisov	Russia	54.78	Q
8	6	6	Péter Bernek	Hungary	54.82	Q
9	3	4	Lavrans Solli	Norway	54.83	Q, NR
10	4	3	Pavel Sankovich	Belarus	54.96	Q, NR
10	5	6	Matteo Milli	Italy	54.96	Q
12	5	7	Nimrod Shapira Bar-Or	Israel	55.01	
13	6	7	Felix Wolf	Germany	55.13	Q
14	6	4	Jérémy Stravius	France	55.21	Q
15	5	2	Sebastiano Ranfagni	Italy	55.39	
16	5	1	Olexandr Isakov	Ukraine	55.48	Q
17	4	2	Christian Diener	Germany	55.59	
18	6	2	Richárd Bohus	Hungary	55.67	Q
19	1	4	Pedro Oliveira	Portugal	55.83	Q, NR
20	6	8	Gábor Balog	Hungary	55.83	
21	4	1	Mikhail Zvyagin	Russia	55.87	SO
21	6	1	Andres Olvik	Estonia	55.87	SO
23	4	7	Jonathan Massacand	Switzerland	55.90	
24	3	2	Martin Baďura	Czech Republic	56.26	
25	2	4	Konstantīns Blohins	Latvia	56.28	NR
26	3	3	Martin Zhelev	Bulgaria	56.36	
26	3	5	Matas Andriekus	Lithuania	56.36	
28	5	8	Karl Burdis	Ireland	56.43	
29	6	5	Juan Miguel Rando Galvez	Spain	56.54	
30	1	3	Jan Šefl	Czech Republic	56.58	
31	4	8	Flori Lang	Switzerland	56.66	
32	2	2	Jakub Jasiński	Poland	56.77	
33	2	7	Pavels Vilcans	Latvia	56.92	
34	3	1	Jean-François Schneiders	Luxembourg	56.93	
35	2	8	Danas Rapšys	Lithuania	57.00	
36	3	6	Lukas Räuftlin	Switzerland	57.31	
36	3	7	Andriy Nikishenko	Ukraine	57.31	
38	2	5	Mateusz Wysoczynski	Poland	57.56	
39	1	5	Roko Šimunić	Croatia	57.61	
40	2	3	Sebastian Stoss	Austria	57.73	
41	2	6	Dominik Dür	Austria	58.09	
42	2	1	Justinas Bilis	Lithuania	58.13	
43	3	8	Petar Petrović	Serbia	58.95	

==== Swim-Off ====
The swim-off took place to determine the last semifinal participant.

Rank	Lane	Name	Nationality	Time	Notes
1	4	Mikhail Zvyagin	Russia	55.97	Q
2	5	Andres Olvik	Estonia	56.15	

=== Semifinals ===
The eight fasters swimmers advanced to the final.

==== Semifinal 1 ====
Rank	Lane	Name	Nationality	Time	Notes
1	1	Richárd Bohus	Hungary	54.35	Q
2	3	Vitaly Borisov	Russia	54.74	Q
3	7	Jérémy Stravius	France	54.79	Q
4	5	Mirco di Tora	Italy	54.88	Q
5	6	Lavrans Solli	Norway	54.90	
6	4	Guy Barnea	Israel	54.95	
7	2	Matteo Milli	Italy	55.25	
8	8	Mikhail Zvyagin	Russia	56.02	

==== Semifinal 2 ====
Rank	Lane	Name	Nationality	Time	Notes
1	3	Helge Meeuw	Germany	53.80	Q
2	5	Aristeidis Grigoriadis	Greece	53.90	Q
3	4	Yakov-Yan Toumarkin	Israel	54.26	Q
4	6	Péter Bernek	Hungary	54.47	Q
5	2	Pavel Sankovich	Belarus	55.06	
6	1	Olexandr Isakov	Ukraine	55.33	
7	7	Felix Wolf	Germany	55.40	
8	8	Pedro Oliveira	Portugal	55.90	

=== Final ===
The final was held at 17:14.

Rank	Lane	Name	Nationality	Time	Notes
1st place, gold medalist(s)	5	Aristeidis Grigoriadis	Greece	53.86	
2nd place, silver medalist(s)	4	Helge Meeuw	Germany	54.06	
3rd place, bronze medalist(s)	3	Yakov-Yan Toumarkin	Israel	54.14	NR
4	2	Péter Bernek	Hungary	54.77	
5	7	Vitaly Borisov	Russia	54.78	
5	8	Mirco di Tora	Italy	54.78	
7	1	Jérémy Stravius	France	54.96	
8	6	Richárd Bohus	Hungary	55.00	
