= Swimming at the 2008 Summer Olympics – Men's 200 metre backstroke =

Men's 200 metre backstroke at the Games of the XXIX Olympiad
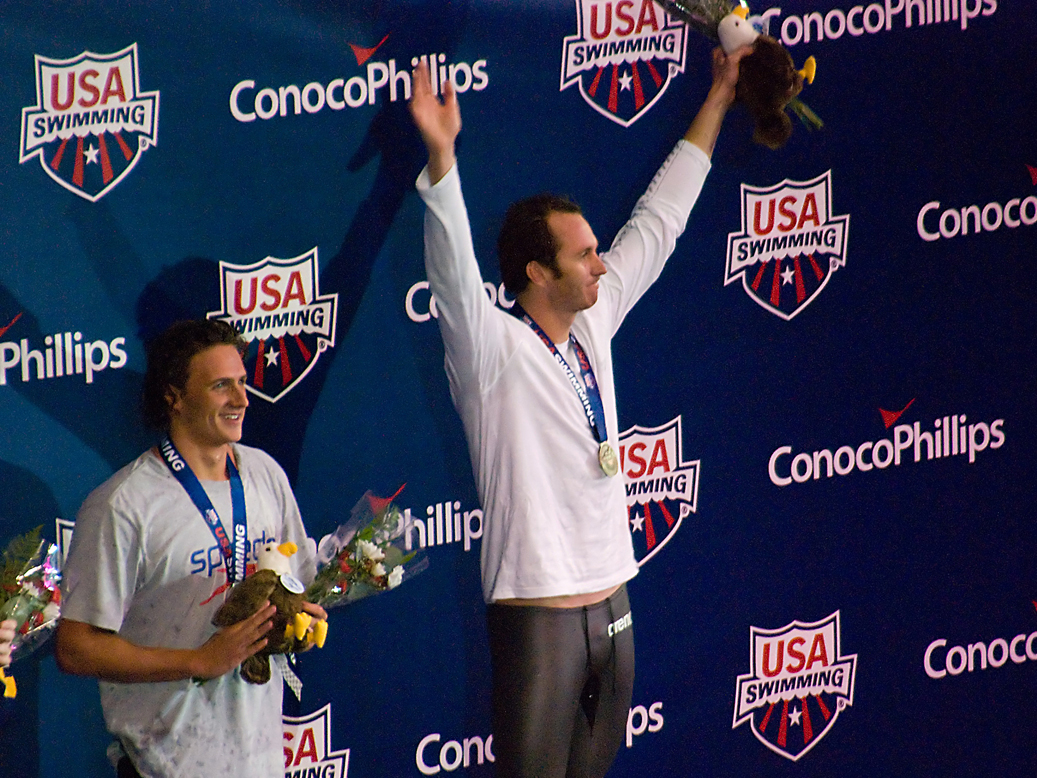
- Gold medalist Ryan Lochte and silver medalist Aaron Peirsol (2009)
- Venue: Beijing National Aquatics Center
- Dates: August 13, 2008 (heats); August 14, 2008 (semifinals); August 15, 2008 (final)
- Competitors: 40 from 31 nations
- Winning time: 1:53.94 WR

Medalists
| 1st place, gold medalist(s) | | Ryan Lochte | United States |
| 2nd place, silver medalist(s) | | Aaron Peirsol | United States |
| 3rd place, bronze medalist(s) | | Arkady Vyatchanin | Russia |

The men's 200 metre backstroke event at the 2008 Olympic Games took place on 13–15 August at the Beijing National Aquatics Center in Beijing, China. There were 40 competitors from 31 nations.

Billed as the Clash of the Titans, Ryan Lochte stormed home on the final lap to defeat his teammate Aaron Peirsol and claim his first individual Olympic gold medal. He touched the wall first in 1:53.94, faster than the world record he shared with Peirsol at 1:54.32. It was the fourth consecutive gold medal in the men's 200 backstroke for the United States, all by different swimmers.

Peirsol enjoyed a head-to-head battle against Lochte in the first 150 metres, but ended up only with a silver in 1:54.33. This made Peirsol the first man to earn three medals in the 200 metre backstroke, adding to his silver in 2000 and gold in 2004. Russia's Arkady Vyatchanin added a second bronze to his collection (he had earlier finished third in the 100 metres backstroke), finishing in a new European record of 1:54.93 to hold off Austria's Markus Rogan (1:55.49), the silver medalist in Athens four years earlier. Earlier in the semifinals, Vyatchanin edged out Germany's Helge Meeuw in a swimoff to secure a last spot for the top 8 final. The medal was the first for Russia in the 200 metre backstroke, though Russian swimmers had earned medals for the Soviet Union and Unified Team in the event.

Japan's Ryosuke Irie finished fifth with a time of 1:55.72, and was followed in the sixth spot by Australia's Hayden Stoeckel, who shared bronze medals with Vyatchanin in the 100 m backstroke, in an Oceanian record of 1:56.39. Romania's Răzvan Florea (1:56.52) and Great Britain's Gregor Tait (1:57.00) rounded out the finale.

== Background ==
This was the 13th appearance of the 200 metre backstroke event. It was first held in 1900. The event did not return until 1964; since then, it has been on the programme at every Summer Games. From 1904 to 1960, a men's 100 metre backstroke was held instead. In 1964, only the 200 metres was held. Beginning in 1968 and ever since, both the 100 and 200 metre versions have been held.

Five of the 8 finalists from the 2004 Games returned: gold medalist (and 2000 silver medalist) Aaron Peirsol of the United States, silver medalist Markus Rogan of Austria, bronze medalist (and 2000 finalist) Răzvan Florea of Romania, sixth-place finisher Simon Dufour of France, and seventh-place finisher Gregor Tait of Great Britain. Peirsol had won the 2001, 2003, and 2005 World Championships and held the world record from 2002 to 2007. His countryman Ryan Lochte, however, had emerged from Peirsol's shadow as a true threat to Peirsol's dominance. After taking bronze in 2005, Lochte defeated Peirsol at the 2007 World Championships, taking the world record as well. Peirsol responded by matching Lochte's record at the U.S. Olympic trials.

The Cayman Islands, Kazakhstan, South Africa, and Uzbekistan each made their debut in the event. Australia and Great Britain each made their 12th appearance, tied for most among nations to that point.

== Qualification ==
Each National Olympic Committee (NOC) could enter up to two swimmers if both met the A qualifying standard, or one swimmer if he met the B standard. For 2008, the A standard was 1:59.72 while the B standard was 2:03.90. The qualifying window was 15 March 2007 to 15 July 2008; only approved meets (generally international competitions and national Olympic trials) during that period could be used to meet the standards. There were also universality places available; if no male swimmer from a nation qualified in any event, the NOC could enter one male swimmer in an event.

The two swimmers per NOC limit had been in place since the 1984 Games.

== Competition format ==
The competition followed the format established in 2000, with three rounds: heats, semifinals, and a final. The advancement rule followed the format introduced in 1952. A swimmer's place in the heat was not used to determine advancement; instead, the fastest times from across all heats in a round were used. The top 16 swimmers from the heats advanced to the semifinals. The top 8 semifinalists advanced to the final. Swim-offs were used as necessary to break ties.

This swimming event used backstroke. Because an Olympic-size swimming pool is 50 metres long, this race consisted of four lengths of the pool.

== Records ==
Prior to this competition, the existing world and Olympic records were as follows.

| World record | Ryan Lochte (USA); Aaron Peirsol (USA) | 1:54.32 | Melbourne, Australia; Omaha, United States | 30 March 2007; 4 July 2008 | |
| Olympic record | Aaron Peirsol (USA) | 1:54.95 | Athens, Greece | 19 August 2004 | - |

The following new world and Olympic records were set during this competition.

| Date | Event | Swimmer | Nation | Time | Record |
|---|---|---|---|---|---|
| August 15 | Final | Ryan Lochte | United States | 1:53.94 | WR |

== Schedule ==
The competition moved to a three-day schedule, rather than two days as in the past.

All times are China Standard Time (UTC+8)

| Date | Time | Round |
|---|---|---|
| Wednesday, 13 August 2008 | 18:54 | Heats |
| Thursday, 14 August 2008 | 10:21 | Semifinals |
| Friday, 15 August 2008 | 10:19 | Final |

== Results ==
=== Heats ===
| Rank | Heat | Lane | Swimmer | Nation | Time | Notes |
|---|---|---|---|---|---|---|
| 1 | 6 | 4 | Ryan Lochte | United States | 1:56.29 | Q |
| 2 | 5 | 4 | Aaron Peirsol | United States | 1:56.35 | Q |
| 3 | 4 | 4 | Markus Rogan | Austria | 1:56.64 | Q |
| 4 | 5 | 5 | Arkady Vyatchanin | Russia | 1:56.97 | Q |
| 5 | 6 | 5 | Gregor Tait | Great Britain | 1:57.03 | Q |
| 6 | 4 | 5 | Hayden Stoeckel | Australia | 1:57.15 | Q |
| 7 | 5 | 3 | Ryosuke Irie | Japan | 1:57.68 | Q |
| 8 | 6 | 7 | Gordan Kožulj | Croatia | 1:57.81 | Q |
| 9 | 6 | 3 | Ashley Delaney | Australia | 1:57.87 | Q |
| 10 | 4 | 3 | Răzvan Florea | Romania | 1:57.97 | Q |
| 11 | 5 | 6 | Helge Meeuw | Germany | 1:58.42 | Q |
| 12 | 4 | 2 | Damiano Lestingi | Italy | 1:58.53 | Q |
| 13 | 3 | 7 | George Du Rand | South Africa | 1:58.62 | Q, AF |
| 14 | 6 | 6 | Stanislav Donets | Russia | 1:58.68 | Q |
| 15 | 6 | 8 | Keith Beavers | Canada | 1:58.84 | Q |
| 16 | 3 | 4 | Tobias Oriwol | Canada | 1:58.94 | Q |
| 17 | 5 | 2 | Pierre Roger | France | 1:59.01 | |
| 18 | 3 | 1 | Omar Pinzón | Colombia | 1:59.11 | |
| 19 | 4 | 1 | Sebastian Stoss | Austria | 1:59.44 | |
| 19 | 6 | 1 | Roland Rudolf | Hungary | 1:59.44 | |
| 21 | 4 | 6 | Takashi Nakano | Japan | 1:59.59 | |
| 22 | 3 | 6 | Derya Büyükuncu | Turkey | 1:59.86 | |
| 23 | 5 | 8 | Lucas Salatta | Brazil | 1:59.91 | |
| 24 | 5 | 1 | Nick Driebergen | Netherlands | 2:00.24 | |
| 25 | 5 | 7 | Mattia Aversa | Italy | 2:00.25 | |
| 26 | 3 | 8 | Kim Ji-heun | South Korea | 2:00.72 | |
| 27 | 2 | 5 | Itai Chammah | Israel | 2:00.93 | |
| 28 | 3 | 2 | Pedro Oliveira | Portugal | 2:01.08 | |
| 29 | 1 | 4 | Brett Fraser | Cayman Islands | 2:01.17 | |
| 30 | 2 | 1 | Pedro Medel | Cuba | 2:01.32 | |
| 31 | 4 | 7 | Gábor Balog | Hungary | 2:01.42 | |
| 32 | 3 | 3 | Jonathan Massacand | Switzerland | 2:01.80 | |
| 33 | 1 | 5 | Oleg Rabota | Kazakhstan | 2:01.95 | |
| 34 | 4 | 8 | Simon Dufour | France | 2:02.00 | |
| 35 | 3 | 5 | Dimitrios Chasiotis | Greece | 2:02.30 | |
| 36 | 2 | 2 | Květoslav Svoboda | Czech Republic | 2:03.12 | |
| 37 | 2 | 4 | Deng Jian | China | 2:03.34 | |
| 38 | 1 | 3 | Sergey Pankov | Uzbekistan | 2:03.51 | |
| 39 | 2 | 6 | Oleksandr Isakov | Ukraine | 2:03.59 | |
| 40 | 2 | 3 | Andres Olvik | Estonia | 2:03.66 | |
| — | 2 | 7 | Simon Sjödin | Sweden | DNS | |
| — | 6 | 2 | Aschwin Wildeboer | Spain | DNS | |

=== Semifinals ===
| Rank | Heat | Lane | Swimmer | Nation | Time | Notes |
|---|---|---|---|---|---|---|
| 1 | 1 | 4 | Aaron Peirsol | United States | 1:55.26 | Q |
| 2 | 2 | 4 | Ryan Lochte | United States | 1:55.40 | Q |
| 3 | 2 | 5 | Markus Rogan | Austria | 1:56.34 | Q |
| 4 | 2 | 6 | Ryosuke Irie | Japan | 1:56.35 | Q |
| 5 | 1 | 2 | Răzvan Florea | Romania | 1:56.45 | Q, NR |
| 6 | 2 | 3 | Gregor Tait | Great Britain | 1:56.72 | Q |
| 7 | 1 | 3 | Hayden Stoeckel | Australia | 1:56.73 | Q, OC |
| 8 | 2 | 7 | Helge Meeuw | Germany | 1:56.85 | QSO |
| 8 | 1 | 5 | Arkady Vyatchanin | Russia | 1:56.85 | QSO |
| 10 | 2 | 2 | Ashley Delaney | Australia | 1:57.73 | |
| 11 | 1 | 7 | Damiano Lestingi | Italy | 1:58.25 | |
| 12 | 2 | 8 | Keith Beavers | Canada | 1:58.50 | |
| 13 | 2 | 1 | George Du Rand | South Africa | 1:58.61 | AF |
| 14 | 1 | 6 | Gordan Kožulj | Croatia | 1:59.22 | |
| 15 | 1 | 8 | Tobias Oriwol | Canada | 1:59.50 | |
| 16 | 1 | 1 | Stanislav Donets | Russia | 1:59.87 | |

Swim-off

| Rank | Lane | Swimmer | Nation | Time | Notes |
|---|---|---|---|---|---|
| 1 | 4 | Arkady Vyatchanin | Russia | 1:57.75 | Q |
| 2 | 5 | Helge Meeuw | Germany | 2:00.97 | |

=== Final ===
| Rank | Lane | Swimmer | Nation | Time | Notes |
|---|---|---|---|---|---|
| 1st place, gold medalist(s) | 5 | Ryan Lochte | United States | 1:53.94 | WR |
| 2nd place, silver medalist(s) | 4 | Aaron Peirsol | United States | 1:54.33 | |
| 3rd place, bronze medalist(s) | 8 | Arkady Vyatchanin | Russia | 1:54.93 | EU |
| 4 | 3 | Markus Rogan | Austria | 1:55.49 | NR |
| 5 | 6 | Ryosuke Irie | Japan | 1:55.72 | |
| 6 | 1 | Hayden Stoeckel | Australia | 1:56.39 | OC |
| 7 | 2 | Răzvan Florea | Romania | 1:56.52 | |
| 8 | 7 | Gregor Tait | Great Britain | 1:57.00 | |
