= Swimming at the 2007 World Aquatics Championships – Men's 200 metre backstroke =

Men's 200 metre freestyle at the 2007 FINA World Championships
- Venue: Rod Laver Arena
- Dates: 29 March 2007 (heats, semifinals); 30 March 2007 (final)
- Competitors: 57
- Winning time: 1:54.32 WR

Medalists
gold medal	Ryan Lochte	United States
silver medal	Aaron Peirsol	United States
bronze medal	Markus Rogan	Austria

The men's 200 metre backstroke at the 2007 World Aquatics Championships took place on 29 March (heats and semifinals) and 30 March (final) at Rod Laver Arena in Melbourne, Australia. 57 swimmers were entered in the event, of which 55 swam.

Existing records at the start of the event were:

- World record (WR): 1:54.44, Aaron Peirsol (USA), August 19, 2006 in Victoria, Canada.
- Championship record (CR): 1:54.66, Aaron Peirsol (USA), Montreal 2005 (July 29, 2005)

== Results ==
=== Finals ===
Place	Name	Nationality	Time	Note
1	Ryan Lochte	United States	1:54.32	WR
2	Aaron Peirsol	United States	1:54.80	
3	Markus Rogan	Austria	1:56.02	
4	Arkady Vyatchanin	Russia	1:57.14	
5	Răzvan Florea	Romania	1:57.31	
6	James Goddard	United Kingdom	1:58.88	
7	Tomomi Morita	Japan	1:59.14	
8	Gregor Tait	United Kingdom	1:59.41	

=== Semifinals ===
Rank	Swimmer	Nation	Time	Note
1	Ryan Lochte	United States	1:55.99	Q
2	Aaron Peirsol	United States	1:56.39	Q
3	Markus Rogan	Austria	1:56.62	Q
4	Arkady Vyatchanin	Russia	1:57.56	Q
5	Răzvan Florea	Romania	1:58.59	Q
6	James Goddard	United Kingdom	1:58.68	Q
7	Tomomi Morita	Japan	1:58.91	Q
8	Gregor Tait	United Kingdom	1:59.52	Q
9	Luca Marin	Italy	1:59.81	
10	Ouyang Kunpeng	China	1:59.91	
11	Masafumi Yamaguchi	Japan	2:00.03	
12	Damiano Lestingi	Italy	2:00.17	
13	Ephraim Hannant	Australia	2:00.95	
14	Pedro Oliveira	Portugal	2:01.18	
15	Nicholas Neckles	Barbados	2:01.66	
16	Itai Chammah	Israel	2:01.79	

=== Heats ===
Rank	Swimmer	Nation	Time	Note
1	Aaron Peirsol	USA	1:57.79	Q
2	Ryan Lochte	USA	1:57.95	Q
3	James Goddard	(United Kingdom) Great Britain	1:58.36	Q
4	Markus Rogan	Austria	1:59.00	Q
5	Răzvan Florea	Romania	1:59.25	Q
6	Tomomi Morita	Japan	1:59.37	Q
7	Gregor Tait	(United Kingdom) Great Britain	1:59.85	Q
7	Arkady Vyatchanin	Russia	1:59.85	Q
9	Masafumi Yamaguchi	Japan	1:59.98	Q
10	Ephraim Hannant	Australia	2:00.31	Q
11	Damiano Lestingi	Italy	2:00.38	Q
12	Luca Marin	Italy	2:00.42	Q
13	Pedro Oliveira	Portugal	2:00.62	Q
14	Itai Chammah	Israel	2:00.93	Q
15	Nicholas Neckles	Barbados	2:01.18	Q
16	Ouyang Kunpeng	China	2:01.21	Q
17	Simon Dufour	France	2:01.52	
18	Georgios Demetis	Greece	2:01.57	
18	Derya Büyükuncu	Turkey	2:01.57	
20	George Du Rand	South Africa	2:01.79	
21	Zhang Bodong	China	2:01.88	
22	Ehud Segal	Israel	2:02.02	
23	Andre Schultz	Brazil	2:02.16	
24	Hayden Stoeckel	Australia	2:02.32	
25	Helge Meeuw	Germany	2:02.34	
26	Jens Thiele	Germany	2:04.02	
27	Juan Veloz	Mexico	2:04.47	
28	Seunghyeon Lee	South Korea	2:04.66	
29	Pavel Sankovich	Belarus	2:05.02	
30	Miguel Robles	Mexico	2:05.54	
31	Sergey Pankov	Uzbekistan	2:05.90	
32	Andriy Oleynyk	Ukraine	2:07.22	
33	Gart Tune	South Africa	2:07.81	
34	Taki Mrabet	Tunisia	2:08.46	
35	Geoffrey Robin Cheah	Hong Kong	2:09.22	
36	David Dunford	Kenya	2:09.34	
37	Iurii Zakharov	Kyrgyzstan	2:10.36	
38	Felix Cristiadi Sutanto	Indonesia	2:10.42	
39	Rony Bakale	Congo	2:10.85	
40	Gael Adam	Mauritius	2:11.13	
41	Wei Shien Zach Ong	Singapore	2:12.16	
42	Kevin Soow Choy Yeap	Malaysia	2:12.32	
43	Stanislav Ossinskiy	Kazakhstan	2:12.65	
44	Sohaib Kalali	Syria	2:12.79	
45	Shahin Baradaran Nakhjavani	Iran	2:14.53	
46	Yu An Lin	Chinese Taipei	2:14.65	
47	Juan Montenegro	Guatemala	2:14.71	
48	Adonis Ganiev	Uzbekistan	2:14.79	
49	Eric Chang	Malaysia	2:15.33	
50	Wen Hao Joshua Lim	Singapore	2:16.01	
51	Amine Kouam	Morocco	2:16.23	
52	Carlos Eduardo Gil	Peru	2:16.80	
53	Andrey Molchanov	Turkmenistan	2:24.03	
54	Richard Randrianandraina	Madagascar	2:33.35	
55	Timur Atahanov	Turkmenistan	2:39.95	
--	Nuno Rola	Angola	DNS	
--	Samson Opuakpo	Nigeria	DNS	

== See also ==
- Swimming at the 2005 World Aquatics Championships – Men's 200 metre backstroke
- Swimming at the 2008 Summer Olympics – Men's 200 metre backstroke
- Swimming at the 2009 World Aquatics Championships – Men's 200 metre backstroke
