= Swimming at the 2016 European Aquatics Championships – Men's 50 metre backstroke =

Men's 50 metre backstroke at the 2016 European Aquatics Championships
- Dates: 18–19 May
- Competitors: 45 from 24 nations
- Winning time: 24.77

Medalists
gold medal	Camille Lacourt	France
silver medal	Richárd Bohus	Hungary
bronze medal	Grigory Tarasevich	Russia

The Men's 50 metre backstroke competition of the 2016 European Aquatics Championships was held on 18 and 19 May 2016.

== Records ==
Prior to the competition, the existing world, European and championship records were as follows.

	Name	Nation	Time	Location	Date
World record	Liam Tancock	Great Britain	24.04	Rome	2 August 2009
European record	Liam Tancock	Great Britain	24.04	Rome	2 August 2009
Championship record	Camille Lacourt	France	24.07	Budapest	12 August 2010

== Results ==
=== Heats ===
The heats were held on 18 May at 11:04.

Rank	Heat	Lane	Name	Nationality	Time	Notes
1	4	4	Grigory Tarasevich	Russia	24.85	Q
2	5	4	Camille Lacourt	France	24.93	Q
3	3	4	Tomasz Polewka	Poland	25.00	Q
4	3	3	Jonatan Kopelev	Israel	25.17	Q
5	3	5	Shane Ryan	Ireland	25.19	Q
6	3	2	Robert Glință	Romania	25.23	Q
7	4	6	Guy Barnea	Israel	25.25	Q
8	5	5	Nikita Ulyanov	Russia	25.29	Q
9	5	7	Richárd Bohus	Hungary	25.44	Q
10	4	3	Simone Sabbioni	Italy	25.45	Q
11	5	3	Carl-Louis Schwarz	Germany	25.54	Q
12	5	6	Viktar Staselovich	Belarus	25.55	Q
12	5	2	Apostolos Christou	Greece	25.55	Q
14	4	5	Chris Walker-Hebborn	Great Britain	25.59	Q
15	4	2	Ralf Tribuntsov	Estonia	25.74	Q
16	3	8	Baskalov İskender	Turkey	25.81	Q
17	4	1	Doruk Tekin	Turkey	25.84	
18	5	1	Benjamin Stasiulis	France	25.93	
19	5	0	David Gamburg	Israel	25.96	
20	5	8	Daniel Macovei	Romania	26.05	
21	5	9	Tomáš Franta	Czech Republic	26.07	
22	1	6	Markus Lie	Norway	26.18	
23	2	6	Karl Luht	Estonia	26.22	
24	4	7	Michail Kontizas	Greece	26.24	
25	1	2	Boris Kirillov	Azerbaijan	26.29	
26	3	9	Ģirts Feldbergs	Latvia	26.31	
27	2	5	Daniel Martin	Romania	26.43	
28	4	0	Gytis Stankevičius	Lithuania	26.44	
29	2	9	Marko Krce Rabar	Croatia	26.46	
30	2	4	Luke Greenbank	Great Britain	26.50	
31	3	0	Mattias Carlsson	Sweden	26.51	
32	4	8	Kristian Komlenić	Croatia	26.53	
33	2	1	Petter Fredriksson	Sweden	26.55	
34	2	0	Ege Başer	Turkey	26.57	
35	2	3	Gabriel Lopes	Portugal	26.58	
36	3	1	Endri Vinter	Estonia	26.65	
37	1	7	Anton Loncar	Croatia	26.67	
38	4	9	Balázs Zámbó	Hungary	26.70	
39	1	4	Axel Pettersson	Sweden	26.73	
40	2	8	Teo Kolonić	Croatia	26.74	
41	2	2	Andrei Gussev	Estonia	26.76	
42	2	7	Pāvels Vilcāns	Latvia	26.94	
43	1	5	Berk Özkul	Turkey	27.03	
44	1	3	Thomas Maurer	Switzerland	27.13	
45	1	1	Bogdan Plavin	Ukraine	28.75	
	3	6	Gábor Balog	Hungary	DNS	
	3	7	Alexis Santos	Portugal	DNS	

=== Semifinals ===
The semifinals were held on 18 May at 19:49.

==== Semifinal 1 ====
Rank	Lane	Name	Nationality	Time	Notes
1	4	Camille Lacourt	France	24.79	Q
2	3	Robert Glință	Romania	24.97	Q
3	6	Nikita Ulyanov	Russia	25.06	Q
4	5	Jonatan Kopelev	Israel	25.20	Q
5	7	Viktar Staselovich	Belarus	25.25	
6	1	Chris Walker-Hebborn	Great Britain	25.36	
7	2	Simone Sabbioni	Italy	25.37	
8	8	Baskalov İskender	Turkey	25.94	

==== Semifinal 2 ====
Rank	Lane	Name	Nationality	Time	Notes
1	5	Tomasz Polewka	Poland	24.87	Q
2	4	Grigory Tarasevich	Russia	25.02	Q
3	2	Richárd Bohus	Hungary	25.04	Q
4	6	Guy Barnea	Israel	25.09	Q
5	1	Apostolos Christou	Greece	25.28	
6	3	Shane Ryan	Ireland	25.32	
7	7	Carl-Louis Schwarz	Germany	25.77	
8	8	Ralf Tribuntsov	Estonia	25.84	

=== Final ===
The final was held on 19 May at 19:32.

Rank	Lane	Name	Nationality	Time	Notes
1st place, gold medalist(s)	4	Camille Lacourt	France	24.77	
2nd place, silver medalist(s)	2	Richárd Bohus	Hungary	24.82	
3rd place, bronze medalist(s)	6	Grigoriy Tarasevich	Russia	24.86	
4	7	Nikita Ulyanov	Russia	24.96	
5	8	Jonatan Kopelev	Israel	25.00	
6	1	Guy Barnea	Israel	25.02	
7	3	Robert Glință	Romania	25.03	
7	5	Tomasz Polewka	Poland	25.03	
