= Swimming at the 2005 World Aquatics Championships – Men's 50 metre backstroke =

Men's 50m Backstroke at the 2005 FINA World Aquatics Championships
- Dates: 30 July (prelims and semifinals); 31 July (final)
- Competitors: 68 from 59 nations
- Winning time: 24.95 seconds

Medalists
gold medal	Aristeidis Grigoriadis	Greece
silver medal	Matt Welsh	Australia
bronze medal	Liam Tancock	Great Britain

The Men's 50 Backstroke event at the 11th FINA World Aquatics Championships swam on 30 – 31 July 2005 in Montreal, Canada. Preliminary and Semifinal heats swam on 30 July; the Final was 31 July.

Prior to the start of the event, the existing World (WR) and Championship (CR) records were both:

- WR and CR: 24.80 swum by Thomas Rupprath (Australia) on 27 July 2003 in Barcelona, Spain

== Results ==
=== Final ===
Place	Swimmer	Nation	Time	Notes
1	Aristeidis Grigoriadis	Greece	24.95	
2	Matt Welsh	Australia	24.99	
3	Liam Tancock	Great Britain	25.02	
4	Randall Bal	USA	25.23	
5	Aaron Peirsol	USA	25.30	
6	Thomas Rupprath	Germany	25.38	
7	Junichi Miyashita	Japan	25.85	
8	Marco Di Carli	Germany	26.48	

=== Semifinals ===
Rank	Swimmer	Nation	Time	Note
1	Aristeidis Grigoriadis	Greece	25.11	Q
2	Liam Tancock	Great Britain	25.22	Q
3	Matt Welsh	Australia	25.36	Q
4	Thomas Rupprath	Germany	25.52	Q
5	Aaron Peirsol	USA	25.55	Q
6	Junichi Miyashita	Japan	25.58	Q
7	Randall Bal	USA	25.60	Q
8	Marco di Carli	Germany	25.69	Q
9	David Ortega	Spain	25.73	
10	Alex Lim	Malaysia	25.78	
11	Flori Lang	Switzerland	25.84	
12	Tomomi Morita	Japan	25.86	
13	Ľuboš Križko	Slovakia	26.04	
14	Scott Talbot	New Zealand	26.23	
15	Pavlo Illichov	Ukraine	26.30	
16	Gabriel Mangabeira	Brazil	26.78	

=== Preliminaries ===
Rank	Heat/Lane	Swimmer	Nation	Time	Notes
1	H9 L5	Thomas Rupprath	Germany	25.44	q
2	H7 L4	Liam Tancock	Great Britain	25.46	q
3	H8 L6	Randall Bal	United States	25.54	q
4	H9 L4	Aristeidis Grigoriadis	Greece	25.59	q
5	H8 L4	Matt Welsh	Australia	25.64	q
6	H9 L6	David Ortega	Spain	25.71	q
7	H7 L6	Aaron Peirsol	United States	25.77	q
8	H8 L3	Alex Lim	Malaysia	25.79	q
9	H7 L3	Junichi Miyashita	Japan	25.80	q
10	H9 L3	Flori Lang	Switzerland	25.98	q
11	H7 L5	Tomomi Morita	Japan	26.02	q
12	H8 L5	Marco di Carli	Germany	26.09	q
13	H7 L2	Ľuboš Križko	Slovakia	26.27	q
14	H8 L7	Scott Talbot	New Zealand	26.30	q
15	H8 L2	Pavlo Illichov	Ukraine	26.39	q
16	H9 L8	Gabriel Mangabeira	Brazil	26.47	q
17	H9 L2	Gordan Kožulj	Croatia	26.49	
18	H8 L8	Pavel Suskov	Lithuania	26.51	
19	H7 L1	Andrew Lauterstein	Australia	26.52	
19	H9 L1	Örn Arnarson	Iceland	7 26.52	
21	H8 L1	Markus Rogan	Austria	26.55	
21	H9 L7	Pierre Roger	France	26.55	
23	H7 L7	Tomasz Rumianowski	Poland	26.80	
24	H4 L6	Yoav Gath	Israel	27.20	
25	H6 L6	Nick Neckles	Barbados	27.37	
26	H6 L2	Jernej Godec	Slovenia	27.45	
27	H6 L7	Garth Tune	South Africa	27.63	
28	H6 L5	Seung-Hyeon Lee	South Korea	27.74	
29	H6 L1	Andy Wibowo	Indonesia	28.01	
30	H5 L4	Jason Dunford	Kenya	28.02	
31	H5 L8	Kieran Locke	Virgin Islands	28.07	
32	H6 L8	Shawn Clarke	Barbados	28.10	
33	H4 L8	Jared Heine	Marshall Islands	28.21	
34	H5 L3	Onan Orlando Thom	Guyana	28.22	
34	H5 L6	Zhi Cong Lim	Singapore	28.22	
36	H5 L2	Alessio Domenack	Peru	28.24	
37	H6 L4	Oleg Pukhnatiy	Uzbekistan	28.50	
38	H4 L5	David Dunford	Kenya	28.52	
39	H4 L4	Chi Lon Lei	Macau	28.55	
39	H7 L8	Mansoor Al-Mansoor	Kuwait	28.55	
41	H5 L7	Gael Adam	Mauritius	28.74	
42	H6 L3	Francois Ghattas	Lebanon	28.77	
43	H3 L3	Yassir Abdalla	Bolivia	28.91	
44	H5 L1	Daniel Carrillo	Paraguay	29.07	
45	H4 L3	Michael O'Connor	Bermuda	29.16	
46	H5 L5	LIN Yu−An	Chinese Taipei	29.24	
47	H3 L4	Francisco Montenegro	Guatemala	29.31	
48	H3 L7	Khaly Ciss	Senegal	29.33	
49	H4 L1	Gordon Touw Ngie Tjouw	Suriname	29.34	
50	H3 L6	Romulo Pereira	Angola	29.92	
50	H3 L2	Erik Rajohnson	Madagascar	29.92	
52	H3 L1	Horacio Carcamo	Honduras	30.45	
53	H2 L5	Imdad Ali	Pakistan	30.59	
54	H2 L2	Diego Foianini	Bolivia	30.62	
55	H2 L1	Alain Brigion-Tobe	Cameroon	30.63	
56	H3 L5	Antonio Tong	Macau	30.70	
57	H3 L8	Reginaldo Panting	Honduras	30.82	
58	H2 L3	Tunui Cowan	Tahiti	31.03	
59	H2 L4	Fernando Medrano	Nicaragua	31.38	
60	H2 L7	Jonathan Calderon	Saint Lucia	31.48	
61	H1 L6	Ganbold Urnultsaikhan	Mongolia	31.67	
62	H2 L8	Connor Keith	Guam	32.24	
63	H1 L5	Gilbert Kaburu	Uganda	33.79	
-	H1 L3	Kodjovi Mawuena Kowouvi	Togo	DNS	
-	H1 L4	Gibrilla Bamba	Sierra Leone	DNS	
-	H2 L6	Andrey Molchanov	Turkmenistan	DNS	
-	H4 L2	Shahin Baradaran	Iran	DNS	
-	H4 L7	Leonel Matonse	Mozambique	DNS	
