= Swimming at the 2012 European Aquatics Championships – Men's 50 metre backstroke =

Men's 50 metre backstroke at the 2012 European Aquatics Championships
- Dates: May 23, 2012 (heats and semifinals); May 24, 2012 (final)
- Competitors: 43 from 25 nations
- Winning time: 24.73

Medalists
gold medal	Jonatan Kopelev	Israel
silver medal	Mirco Di Tora	Italy
bronze medal	Dorian Gandin	France
bronze medal	Guy Barnea	Israel
bronze medal	Richárd Bohus	Hungary

The men's 50 metre backstroke competition of the swimming events at the 2012 European Aquatics Championships took place May 23 and 24. The heats and semifinals took place on May 23, the final on May 24.

== Records ==
Prior to the competition, the existing world, European and championship records were as follows.

	Name	Nation	Time	Location	Date
World record European record	Liam Tancock	Great Britain	24.04	Rome	August 2, 2009
Championship record	Camille Lacourt	France	24.07	Budapest	August 12, 2010

== Results ==
=== Heats ===
43 swimmers participated in 6 heats.

Rank	Heat	Lane	Name	Nationality	Time	Notes
1	6	3	Mirco Di Tora	Italy	25.18	Q
2	6	5	Jonatan Kopelev	Israel	25.24	Q
3	6	6	Dorian Gandin	France	25.40	Q
4	6	4	Guy Barnea	Israel	25.44	Q
5	4	5	Aristeidis Grigoriadis	Greece	25.46	Q
6	6	2	Pavel Sankovich	Belarus	25.49	Q, NR
7	4	7	Christian Diener	Germany	25.52	Q
8	5	3	Stefano Mauro Pizzamiglio	Italy	25.59	Q
9	5	4	Helge Meeuw	Germany	25.62	Q
10	5	7	Lavrans Solli	Norway	25.67	Q, NR
11	5	6	Richárd Bohus	Hungary	25.68	Q
12	4	3	Juan Miguel Rando Galvez	Spain	25.71	Q
13	5	5	Vitaly Borisov	Russia	25.78	Q
14	6	1	David Gamburg	Israel	25.86	
15	4	6	Karl Burdis	Ireland	25.87	Q
16	5	8	Alexis Manacas Santos	Portugal	25.88	Q, NR
17	4	4	Flori Lang	Switzerland	25.94	Q
18	6	7	Matteo Milli	Italy	25.99	
19	5	2	Sebastiano Ranfagni	Italy	26.06	
20	3	6	Jonathan Massacand	Switzerland	26.13	
21	3	4	Jakub Jasiński	Poland	26.24	
22	3	2	Martin Zhelev	Bulgaria	26.26	NR
23	4	1	Olexandr Isakov	Ukraine	26.30	
24	2	5	Martin Baďura	Czech Republic	26.31	NR
25	3	5	Ádám Szilágyi	Hungary	26.32	
25	6	8	Gábor Balog	Hungary	26.32	
27	1	4	Itai Chammha	Israel	26.34	
28	4	2	Andres Olvik	Estonia	26.41	
29	2	6	Mikhail Zvyagin	Russia	26.43	
30	2	3	Konstantīns Blohins	Latvia	26.47	
31	5	1	Roko Šimunić	Croatia	26.48	
32	3	8	Matas Andriekus	Lithuania	26.51	
33	2	7	Pavels Vilcans	Latvia	26.61	
34	3	1	Sasa Gerbec	Croatia	26.63	
35	4	8	Mateusz Wysoczynski	Poland	26.64	
36	2	4	Dominik Dür	Austria	26.69	
37	2	8	Justinas Bilis	Lithuania	26.98	
38	2	2	Jean-François Schneiders	Luxembourg	27.00	
39	1	5	Petar Petrović	Serbia	27.04	
39	3	3	Mindaugas Sadauskas	Lithuania	27.04	
41	2	1	Lukas Räuftlin	Switzerland	27.22	
42	3	7	Péter Bernek	Hungary	28.34	
43	1	3	Ari-Pekka Liukkonen	Finland	28.53	

=== Semifinals ===
The eight fasters swimmers advanced to the final.

==== Semifinal 1 ====
Rank	Lane	Name	Nationality	Time	Notes
1	4	Jonatan Kopelev	Israel	24.98	Q
2	5	Guy Barnea	Israel	25.29	Q
3	3	Pavel Sankovich	Belarus	25.36	Q, NR
4	2	Lavrans Solli	Norway	25.40	Q, NR
5	6	Stefano Mauro Pizzamiglio	Italy	25.54	
6	8	Flori Lang	Switzerland	25.75	
7	1	Karl Burdis	Ireland	25.78	
8	7	Juan Miguel Rando Galvez	Spain	25.88	

==== Semifinal 2 ====
Rank	Lane	Name	Nationality	Time	Notes
1	4	Mirco Di Tora	Italy	25.23	Q
2	3	Aristeidis Grigoriadis	Greece	25.29	Q
3	7	Richárd Bohus	Hungary	25.36	Q, NR
4	5	Dorian Gandin	France	25.39	Q
5	6	Christian Diener	Germany	25.51	
6	1	Vitaly Borisov	Russia	25.70	
7	2	Helge Meeuw	Germany	25.78	
8	8	Alexis Manacas Santos	Portugal	26.01	

=== Final ===
The final was held at 18:19.

Rank	Lane	Name	Nationality	Time	Notes
1st place, gold medalist(s)	4	Jonatan Kopelev	Israel	24.73	
2nd place, silver medalist(s)	5	Mirco Di Tora	Italy	24.95	
3rd place, bronze medalist(s)	1	Dorian Gandin	France	25.14	
3rd place, bronze medalist(s)	3	Guy Barnea	Israel	25.14	
3rd place, bronze medalist(s)	7	Richárd Bohus	Hungary	25.14	NR
6	2	Pavel Sankovich	Belarus	25.25	NR
7	8	Lavrans Solli	Norway	25.28	NR
8	6	Aristeidis Grigoriadis	Greece	25.46	
