= List of Maccabiah records in swimming =

The International Olympic Committee and Israel Swim Association recognise the fastest performances in pool-based swimming events at the Maccabiah Games.

Races are held in four swimming strokes: freestyle, backstroke, breaststroke and butterfly, over varying distances and in either individual or relay race events. In the 2009 Maccabiah Games, both men and women competed in sixteen events in the pool, each sex in the same events with the exceptions of the 800 m freestyle (women-only) and the 1500 m freestyle (men-only). Maccabiah records were broken on a total of 21 occasions, eventually leaving just eleven outstanding from earlier Games. Of the 32 pool-based events, all records belong to just two countries the United States with eighteen and Israel with fifteen.

== Men's records ==
Statistics are correct as of the end of the 2022 Maccabiah Games in Israel and include only those events which are currently recognised by the IOC as Olympic events.

Event	Record	Name	Nation	Games	Date	Ref(s)
50 m freestyle	22.19	Jason Lezak	United States (USA)	2009	July 22, 2009	
100 m freestyle	47.78	Jason Lezak	United States (USA)	2009	July 22, 2009	
200 m freestyle	1:50.39	Shai Livnat	Israel (ISR)	2005	July 12, 2005	
400 m freestyle	3:54.87	Max Jaben	United States (USA)	2005	July 13, 2005	
1500 m freestyle	15:32.51	Scott Korotkin	United States (USA)	2009	July 22, 2009	
100 m backstroke	54.22	Guy Barnea	Israel (ISR)	2009	July 21, 2009	
200 m backstroke	2:02.12	Itai Chammah	Israel (ISR)	2009	July 19, 2009	
100 m breaststroke	1:02.88	Dani Malnik	Israel (ISR)	2009	July 21, 2009	
200 m breaststroke	2:16.71	Jeff Weiss	United States (USA)	1997	July 10, 1997	
100 m butterfly	52.99	Alon Mandel	Israel (ISR)	2009	July 20, 2009	
200 m butterfly	1:58.15	Daniel Madwed	United States (USA)	2005	July 10, 2005	
200 m individual medley	2:03.39	Nimrod Hayet	Israel (ISR)	2009	July 22, 2009	
400 m individual medley	4:19.37	Gal Nevo	Israel (ISR)	2009	July 20, 2009	
4×100 m freestyle relay	3:21.17	Jason Goldner (51.29); Andrew Novakoff (51.49); Andrew Langenfeld (50.91); Jason Lezak (47.56)	United States (USA)	2009	July 20, 2009	
4×200 m freestyle relay	7:30.38		United States (USA)	2005	July 13, 2005	
4×100 m medley relay	3:43.07	Joshua Hafkin (56.59); David Zolno (1:05.51); Andrew Langenfeld (53.13); Jason Lezak (47.84)	United States (USA)	2009	July 22, 2009	

== Women's records ==
Statistics are correct as of the end of the 2022 Maccabiah Games in Israel and include only those events which are currently recognised by the IOC as Olympic events.

Event	Record	Name	Nation	Games	Date	Ref(s)
50 m freestyle	26.44	Andrea Murez	United States (USA)	2009	July 22, 2009	
100 m freestyle	56.64	Andrea Murez	United States (USA)	2009	July 19, 2009	
200 m freestyle	2:03.45	Andrea Murez	United States (USA)	2009	July 20, 2009	
400 m freestyle	4:19.45	Lissa Martin	United States (USA)	1993	July 15, 1993	
800 m freestyle	8:52.58	Olga Beresnyev	Israel (ISR)	2005	July 14, 2005	
1500 m Freestyle	17:45.63	Erika Schraber	United States (USA)	2022	July 17, 2022	
100 m backstroke	1:03.93	Anna Volchkov	Israel (ISR)	2009	July 21, 2009	
200 m backstroke	2:18.36	Danit Kama	Israel (ISR)	2005	July 10, 2005	
100 m breaststroke	1:09.87	Yuliya Banach	Israel (ISR)	2009	July 21, 2009	
200 m breaststroke	2:40.29	Ruth Grodetzki	United States (USA)	1989	July 15, 1989	
100 m butterfly	58.50	Amit Ivry	Israel (ISR)	2009	July 20, 2009	
200 m butterfly	2:18.03	Sheryl Segal	United States (USA)	1985	July 15, 1985	
200 m individual medley	2:20.17	Anastasia Gorbenko	Israel (ISR)	2022	July 17, 2022	
400 m individual medley	4:57.15	Amit Bechar	Israel (ISR)	2009	July 20, 2009	
4×100 m freestyle relay	3:53.55	Naomi Javanifard (58.22); Haley Mitchell (59.93); Danielle Arad (58.93); Andrea Murez (56.47)	United States (USA)	2009	July 20, 2009	
4×200 m freestyle relay	♦8:32.12	Noam Bechar (2:09.78); Amit Bechar (2:09.55); Efrat Rotshtein (2:07.74); Keren Ziebner (2:05.05)	Israel (ISR)	2009	July 21, 2009	
4×100 m medley relay	4:17.60	Dekel Shahaff (1:05.84); Amit Loutati (1:13.90); Kristina Tchernychev (1:00.92); Keren Ziebner (56.94)	Israel (ISR)	2009	July 22, 2009	
