= Swimming at the 2016 European Aquatics Championships – Women's 100 metre freestyle =

Women's 100 metre freestyle at the 2016 European Aquatics Championships
- Dates: 17–18 May
- Competitors: 82 from 35 nations
- Winning time: 52.82

Medalists
gold medal	Sarah Sjöström	Sweden
silver medal	Ranomi Kromowidjojo	Netherlands
bronze medal	Femke Heemskerk	Netherlands

The Women's 100 metre freestyle competition of the 2016 European Aquatics Championships was held on 17 and 18 May 2016.

== Records ==
Prior to the competition, the existing world, European and championship records were as follows.

	Name	Nation	Time	Location	Date
World record	Britta Steffen	Germany	52.07	Rome	31 July 2009
European record	Britta Steffen	Germany	52.07	Rome	31 July 2009
Championship record	Sarah Sjöström	Sweden	52.67	Berlin	20 August 2014

== Results ==
=== Heats ===
The heats were held on 17 May at 10.57.

Rank	Heat	Lane	Name	Nationality	Time	Notes
1	7	4	Ranomi Kromowidjojo	Netherlands	53.37	Q
2	7	5	Jeanette Ottesen	Denmark	53.78	
3	9	4	Femke Heemskerk	Netherlands	53.81	Q
4	8	4	Sarah Sjöström	Sweden	54.04	Q
5	8	5	Charlotte Bonnet	France	54.50	Q
6	6	2	Mie Nielsen	Denmark	54.55	Q
7	9	6	Andrea Murez	Israel	54.67	Q
8	7	3	Erika Ferraioli	Italy	54.70	Q
8	8	6	Maud van der Meer	Netherlands	54.70	
10	5	1	Theodora Drakou	Greece	54.81	Q
11	9	2	Silvia Di Pietro	Italy	54.90	Q
12	9	8	Nina Rangelova	Bulgaria	54.91	Q
12	8	3	Pernille Blume	Denmark	54.91	
14	8	9	Evelyn Verrasztó	Hungary	55.29	Q
15	7	8	Maria Ugolkova	Switzerland	55.30	Q
16	9	3	Marrit Steenbergen	Netherlands	55.37	
17	9	0	Laura Letrari	Italy	55.50	
18	4	5	Patricia Castro	Spain	55.51	Q
19	8	7	Katarína Listopadová	Slovakia	55.52	Q
20	7	6	Mathilde Cini	France	55.62	Q
21	6	1	Birgit Koschischek	Austria	55.70	Q
22	5	6	Janja Šegel	Slovenia	55.71	
23	7	9	Marta González	Spain	55.72	
24	7	1	Fatima Gallardo	Spain	55.75	
25	7	7	Ida Marko-Varga	Sweden	55.76	
26	8	8	Anna Kolářová	Czech Republic	55.78	
27	9	7	Aglaia Pezzato	Italy	55.79	
28	8	1	Harriet Cooper	Great Britain	55.80	
29	8	2	Anna Santamans	France	55.85	
29	6	4	Cecilie Johannessen	Norway	55.85	
31	6	7	Miroslava Syllabová	Slovakia	55.86	
32	7	0	Yuliya Khitraya	Belarus	55.90	
32	6	0	Anna Dowgiert	Poland	55.90	
34	4	6	Lotte Goris	Belgium	55.97	
35	5	4	Ekaterina Avramova	Turkey	56.00	
36	7	2	Louise Hansson	Sweden	56.06	
37	3	4	Marte Løvberg	Norway	56.14	
38	6	6	Kimberly Buys	Belgium	56.16	
39	6	5	Keren Siebner	Israel	56.20	
40	4	9	Tjaša Pintar	Slovenia	56.22	
41	6	3	Hanna-Maria Seppälä	Finland	56.32	
41	9	1	Julie Jensen	Denmark	56.32	
41	4	3	Aleksandra Urbańczyk	Poland	56.32	
44	6	8	Julie Meynen	Luxembourg	56.35	
44	5	7	Ajna Késely	Hungary	56.35	
46	5	0	Juliette Casini	Belgium	56.36	
46	4	2	Lidón Muñoz	Spain	56.36	
48	5	3	Lucy Hope	Great Britain	56.40	
49	3	5	Noemi Girardet	Switzerland	56.46	
50	6	9	Georgia Coates	Great Britain	56.48	
51	4	0	Diana Sokołowska	Poland	56.49	
52	5	2	Lotta Nevalainen	Finland	56.66	
52	9	9	Jessica Jackson	Great Britain	56.66	
54	4	7	Juliette Dumont	Belgium	56.71	
55	5	5	Ida Lindborg	Sweden	56.90	
56	5	9	Zohar Shikler	Israel	56.91	
57	3	7	Barbora Mišendová	Slovakia	56.96	
58	5	8	Bryndís Hansen	Iceland	56.98	
59	3	2	Kertu Alnek	Estonia	57.09	
60	4	4	Sasha Touretski	Switzerland	57.13	
61	4	8	İlknur Çakıcı	Turkey	57.19	
62	3	6	Julia Kukla	Austria	57.28	
62	3	3	Fanny Teijonsalo	Finland	57.28	
64	3	9	Gabriela Ņikitina	Latvia	57.44	
65	2	4	Esra Kaçmaz	Turkey	57.45	
66	1	4	Sanja Jovanović	Croatia	57.52	
67	3	8	Wioletta Orczykowska	Poland	58.08	
68	3	0	Tess Grossmann	Estonia	58.34	
69	4	1	Ana Leite	Portugal	58.37	
70	3	1	SvenjaStoffel	Switzerland	58.43	
71	2	3	Nichola Muscat	Malta	58.66	
72	2	5	Sara Lettoli	San Marino	58.85	
73	2	6	Monica Ramírez	Andorra	59.13	
74	2	7	Monika Vasilyan	Armenia	59.74	
75	1	6	Nikol Merizaj	Albania	59.81	
76	2	1	Signhild Joensen	Armenia	59.89	
77	1	5	Elena Giovannini	San Marino	1:00.14	
78	2	9	Elisa Bernardi	San Marino	1:00.30	
79	2	0	Nejla Karić	Bosnia and Herzegovina	1:00.41	
80	1	3	Nadia Tudo	Andorra	1:00.68	
81	2	8	Martina Ceccaroni	Faroe Islands	1:00.61	
82	2	2	Sara Lettoli	San Marino	1:00.65	
	8	0	Margaux Fabre	France	DNS	
	9	5	Katinka Hosszú	Hungary	DNS	

=== Semifinals ===
The semifinals were held on 17 May at 18:07.

==== Semifinal 1 ====
Rank	Lane	Name	Nationality	Time	Notes
1	4	Femke Heemskerk	Netherlands	54.15	Q
2	5	Charlotte Bonnet	France	54.29	Q
3	3	Andrea Murez	Israel	54.57	Q
4	2	Nina Rangelova	Bulgaria	54.76	Q
5	7	Maria Ugolkova	Switzerland	55.10	
6	6	Theodora Drakou	Greece	55.17	
7	1	Katarína Listopadová	Slovakia	55.35	
8	8	Birgit Koschischek	Austria	55.81	

==== Semifinal 2 ====
Rank	Lane	Name	Nationality	Time	Notes
1	4	Ranomi Kromowidjojo	Netherlands	54.44	Q
2	5	Sarah Sjöström	Sweden	54.55	Q
3	3	Mie Nielsen	Denmark	54.63	
4	2	Silvia Di Pietro	Italy	54.77	Q
5	7	Evelyn Verrasztó	Hungary	54.91	Q
6	6	Erika Ferraioli	Italy	54.96	
7	8	Mathilde Cini	France	55.36	
8	1	Patricia Castro	Spain	55.49	

=== Final ===
The final was held on 18 May at 19:21.

Rank	Lane	Name	Nationality	Time	Notes
1st place, gold medalist(s)	6	Sarah Sjöström	Sweden	52.82	
2nd place, silver medalist(s)	3	Ranomi Kromowidjojo	Netherlands	53.24	
3rd place, bronze medalist(s)	4	Femke Heemskerk	Netherlands	53.72	
4	5	Charlotte Bonnet	France	54.01	
5	2	Andrea Murez	Israel	54.89	
6	7	Nina Rangelova	Bulgaria	54.96	
7	1	Silvia Di Pietro	Italy	55.11	
8	8	Evelyn Verrasztó	Hungary	56.52	
