= Swimming at the 2016 European Aquatics Championships – Men's 200 metre backstroke =

Men's 200 metre backstroke at the 2016 European Aquatics Championships
- Dates: 20 May
- Competitors: 41 from 20 nations
- Winning time: 1:55.98

Medalists
gold medal	Radosław Kawęcki	Poland
silver medal	Yakov Toumarkin	Israel
bronze medal	Danas Rapšys	Lithuania

The Men's 200 metre backstroke competition of the 2016 European Aquatics Championships was held on 20 May 2016.

== Records ==
Prior to the competition, the existing world, European and championship records were as follows.

	Name	Nation	Time	Location	Date
World record	Aaron Peirsol	United States	1:51.92	Rome	31 July 2009
European record	Evgeny Rylov	Russia	1:54.21	Moscow	21 April 2016
Championship record	Radosław Kawęcki	Poland	1:55.28	Debrecen	26 May 2012

== Results ==
=== Heats ===
The heats were held on 20 May at 10:00.

Rank	Heat	Lane	Name	Nationality	Time	Notes
1	5	6	Dávid Földházi	Hungary	1:57.69	Q
2	5	4	Radosław Kawęcki	Poland	1:58.41	Q
3	4	4	Yakov Toumarkin	Israel	1:58.44	Q
4	5	3	Gábor Balog	Hungary	1:58.70	Q
5	5	5	Luke Greenbank	Great Britain	1:58.81	Q
6	3	4	Danas Rapšys	Lithuania	1:58.95	Q
7	4	3	Christopher Ciccarese	Italy	1:59.08	Q
8	5	2	Ádám Telegdy	Hungary	1:59.10	
9	4	5	Luca Mencarini	Italy	1:59.19	Q
10	4	6	Balázs Zámbó	Hungary	1:59.34	
11	3	6	Benjamin Stasiulis	France	2:00.17	Q
12	3	7	Roman Dmitriyev	Czech Republic	2:00.42	Q
13	3	5	Grigory Tarasevich	Russia	2:00.45	Q
14	4	8	Petter Fredriksson	Sweden	2:00.91	Q
15	3	8	Kristian Kron	Sweden	2:01.01	Q
16	2	9	Robert Glință	Romania	2:01.09	Q
17	3	3	Apostolos Christou	Greece	2:01.14	Q
18	4	2	Mattias Carlsson	Sweden	2:01.24	
19	4	1	Anton Loncar	Croatia	2:01.47	Q
20	1	3	Pavel Janeček	Czech Republic	2:01.64	
21	2	5	Teo Kolonić	Croatia	2:01.73	
22	3	0	Daniel Martin	Romania	2:01.82	
23	4	0	Tomáš Franta	Czech Republic	2:01.96	
24	5	1	Nils Van Audekerke	Belgium	2:02.07	
25	2	1	Max Litchfield	Great Britain	2:02.29	
26	5	9	Marko Krce Rabar	Croatia	2:02.33	
27	5	0	Yuval Safra	Israel	2:02.39	
28	4	9	Arthur Polyak	Israel	2:02.59	
29	2	2	Ege Başer	Turkey	2:02.95	
30	3	9	Boris Kirillov	Azerbaijan	2:03.32	
31	4	7	Lander Hendrickx	Belgium	2:03.47	
32	5	7	David Gamburg	Israel	2:03.71	
33	2	7	Ģirts Feldbergs	Latvia	2:03.94	
34	3	1	Axel Pettersson	Sweden	2:03.96	
35	2	4	Joan Lluís Pons	Spain	2:04.29	
36	2	6	Gabriel Lopes	Portugal	2:04.33	
37	2	8	Gytis Stankevičius	Lithuania	2:04.84	
38	1	6	Marcin Tarczyński	Poland	2:04.89	
39	1	4	Ergecan Gezmiş	Turkey	2:05.55	
40	2	0	Michail Kontizas	Greece	2:06.31	
41	1	5	Andrei Gussev	Estonia	2:10.49	
	2	2	Carl-Louis Schwarz	Germany	DNS	
	3	2	Joseph Hulme	Great Britain	DNS	
	5	8	Nils Liess	Switzerland	DNS	

=== Semifinals ===
The semifinals were held on 20 May at 19:08.

==== Semifinal 1 ====
Rank	Lane	Name	Nationality	Time	Notes
1	3	Danas Rapšys	Lithuania	1:57.35	Q
2	4	Radosław Kawęcki	Poland	1:57.39	Q
3	5	Gábor Balog	Hungary	1:59.04	Q
4	6	Luca Mencarini	Italy	1:59.05	Q
5	2	Roman Dmitriyev	Czech Republic	1:59.53	
6	1	Robert Glință	Romania	2:00.91	
7	8	Anton Loncar	Croatia	2:01.80	
8	7	Petter Fredriksson	Sweden	2:02.13	

==== Semifinal 2 ====
Rank	Lane	Name	Nationality	Time	Notes
1	8	Apostolos Christou	Greece	1:57.41	Q
2	5	Yakov Toumarkin	Israel	1:57.95	Q
3	6	Christopher Ciccarese	Italy	1:58.50	Q
4	7	Grigory Tarasevich	Russia	1:58.55	Q
5	3	Luke Greenbank	Great Britain	1:59.21	
6	4	Dávid Földházi	Hungary	1:59.48	
7	2	Benjamin Stasiulis	France	2:00.45	
8	1	Kristian Kron	Sweden	2:00.90	

=== Final ===
The final was on 21 May at 17:18.

Rank	Lane	Name	Nationality	Time	Notes
1st place, gold medalist(s)	5	Radosław Kawęcki	Poland	1:55.98	
2nd place, silver medalist(s)	6	Yakov Toumarkin	Israel	1:56.97	
3rd place, bronze medalist(s)	4	Danas Rapšys	Lithuania	1:57.22	
4	1	Gábor Balog	Hungary	1:58.66	
5	3	Apostolos Christou	Greece	1:58.87	
6	7	Grigory Tarasevich	Russia	1:59.31	
7	2	Christopher Ciccarese	Italy	1:59.45	
8	8	Luca Mencarini	Italy	2:02.04	
