= Swimming at the 2005 World Aquatics Championships – Men's 200 metre backstroke =

Men's 200 metre backstroke at the 2005 FINA World Championships
- Dates: 28 July 2005 (heats, semifinals); 29 July 2005 (final)
- Competitors: 47 from 39 nations
- Winning time: 1:54.66 WR

Medalists
gold medal	Aaron Peirsol	United States
silver medal	Markus Rogan	Austria
bronze medal	Ryan Lochte	United States

The men's 200 metre backstroke event at the 2005 World Aquatics Championships took place between 28 July – 29 July. Both the heats and semifinals were held on 28 July, with the heats being held in the morning session and the semifinals in the evening session. The final was held on 29 July.

== Records ==
Prior to the competition, the existing world and championship records were as follows.

	Name	Nationality	Time	Location	Date
World record	Aaron Peirsol	United States	1:54.74	Long Beach	12 July 2004
Championship record	Aaron Peirsol	United States	1:55.82	Barcelona	24 July 2003

The following records were established during the competition:

Date	Round	Name	Nationality	Time	WR	CR
July 29	Final	Aaron Peirsol	United States	1:54.66	WR	CR

== Results ==
=== Heats ===
Rank	Heat/Lane	Name	Nationality	Time	Notes
1	H6 L4	Aaron Peirsol	United States	1:58.04	qualified
2	H6 L2	Gordan Kožulj	Croatia	1:59.03	qualified
3	H4 L4	Markus Rogan	Austria	1:59.33	qualified
4	H6 L6	Tomomi Morita	Japan	1:59.78	qualified
5	H5 L5	Răzvan Florea	Romania	1:59.88	qualified
6	H4 L3	Takashi Nakano	Japan	1:59.97	qualified
7	H5 L6	Blaž Medvešek	Slovenia	2:00.11	qualified
8	H6 L5	Ryan Lochte	United States	2:00.27	qualified
9	H6 L3	Gregor Tait	Great Britain	2:00.57	qualified
10	H4 L5	Arkady Vyatchanin	Russia	2:01.03	qualified
11	H5 L3	Simon Dufour	France	2:01.60	qualified
12	H4 L2	Steffen Driesen	Germany	2:01.69	qualified
13	H4 L1	Derya Büyükuncu	Turkey	2:01.93	qualified
14	H5 L4	James Goddard	Great Britain	2:02.00	qualified
15	H5 L1	Yoav Gath	Israel	2:02.12	qualified
16	H5 L7	Patrick Murphy	Australia	2:02.27	qualified
17	H5 L8	Pavel Suskov	Lithuania	2:02.36	
18	H4 L6	Matt Welsh	Australia	2:02.64	
19	H5 L2	Keith Beavers	Canada	2:02.88	
20	H4 L7	Cameron Gibson	New Zealand	2:02.89	
21	H6 L7	Luca Marin	Italy	2:03.41	
22	H6 L1	Nick Neckles	Barbados	2:04.00	
23	H6 L8	Alex Lim	Malaysia	2:04.09	
24	H3 L4	Tomasz Rumianowski	Poland	2:04.15	
25	H4 L8	Sebastian Stoss	Austria	2:04.30	
26	H3 L5	Adriano Niz	Portugal	2:04.61	
27	H3 L6	Seung-Hyeon Lee	South Korea	2:06.92	
28	H3 L1	Alessio Domenack	Peru	2:09.63	
29	H3 L8	Sergey Pankov	Uzbekistan	2:10.28	
30	H2 L5	Marcus Cheah	Singapore	2:11.04	
31	H2 L3	Zhi Cong Lim	Singapore	2:11.35	
32	H2 L7	Kieran Locke	Virgin Islands	2:11.96	
33	H2 L2	Andy Wibowo	Indonesia	2:12.42	
34	H2 L1	David Dunford	Kenya	2:12.84	
35	H3 L2	Yury Zaharov	Kyrgyzstan	2:12.91	
36	H2 L8	Francisco Montenegro	Guatemala	2:13.46	
37	H2 L4	Gael Adam	Mauritius	2:13.75	
38	H1 L4	Shahin Baradaran	Iran	2:15.04	
39	H1 L3	Antonio Tong	Macau	2:15.79	
40	H3 L7	Suriya Suksuphak	Thailand	2:17.29	
41	H2 L6	LIN Yu-An	Chinese Taipei	2:17.30	
42	H1 L8	Francois Ghattas	Lebanon	2:19.15	
43	H1 L5	Scott Hensley	Virgin Islands	2:22.11	
44	H1 L6	Diego Foianini	Bolivia	2:22.28	
45	H1 L1	Horacio Carcamo	Honduras	2:23.19	
46	H1 L2	Reginaldo Panting	Honduras	2:23.29	
47	H1 L7	Imdad Ali	Pakistan	2:23.46	

=== Semifinals ===
Rank	Heat/Lane	Name	Nationality	Time	Notes
1	S2 L4	Aaron Peirsol	(United States) USA	1:56.60	q
2	S2 L5	Markus Rogan	Austria	1:57.16	q
3	S2 L3	Răzvan Florea	Romania	1:58.03	q
4	S1 L6	Ryan Lochte	(United States) USA	1:58.17	q
5	S1 L2	Arkady Vyatchanin	Russia	1:58.60	q
6	S1 L5	Tomomi Morita	Japan	1:58.70	q
7	S1 L4	Gordan Kožulj	Croatia	1:58.74	q
8	S1 L3	Takashi Nakano	Japan	1:58.91	q
9	S2 L2	Gregor Tait	(United Kingdom) Great Britain	1:58.97	
10	S2 L6	Blaž Medvešek	Slovenia	1:59.10	
11	S1 L1	James Goddard	(United Kingdom) Great Britain	1:59.16	
12	S2 L7	Simon Dufour	France	2:00.08	
13	S1 L7	Steffen Driesen	Germany	2:00.88	
14	S2 L8	Yoav Gath	Israel	2:01.58	
14	S2 L1	Derya Büyükuncu	Turkey	2:01.58	
16	S1 L8	Patrick Murphy	Australia	2:03.15	

=== Final ===
Rank	Name	Nationality	Time	Notes
1st place, gold medalist(s)	Aaron Peirsol	(United States) USA	1:54.66	WR
2nd place, silver medalist(s)	Markus Rogan	Austria	1:56.63	
3rd place, bronze medalist(s)	Ryan Lochte	(United States) USA	1:57.00	
4	Răzvan Florea	Romania	1:57.03	
5	Takashi Nakano	Japan	1:58.03	
6	Gordan Kožulj	Croatia	1:58.28	
7	Arkady Vyatchanin	Russia	1:59.02	
8	Tomomi Morita	Japan	1:59.34	

Key: WR = World record
