= Andrea Murez =

Israeli swimmer (born 1992)

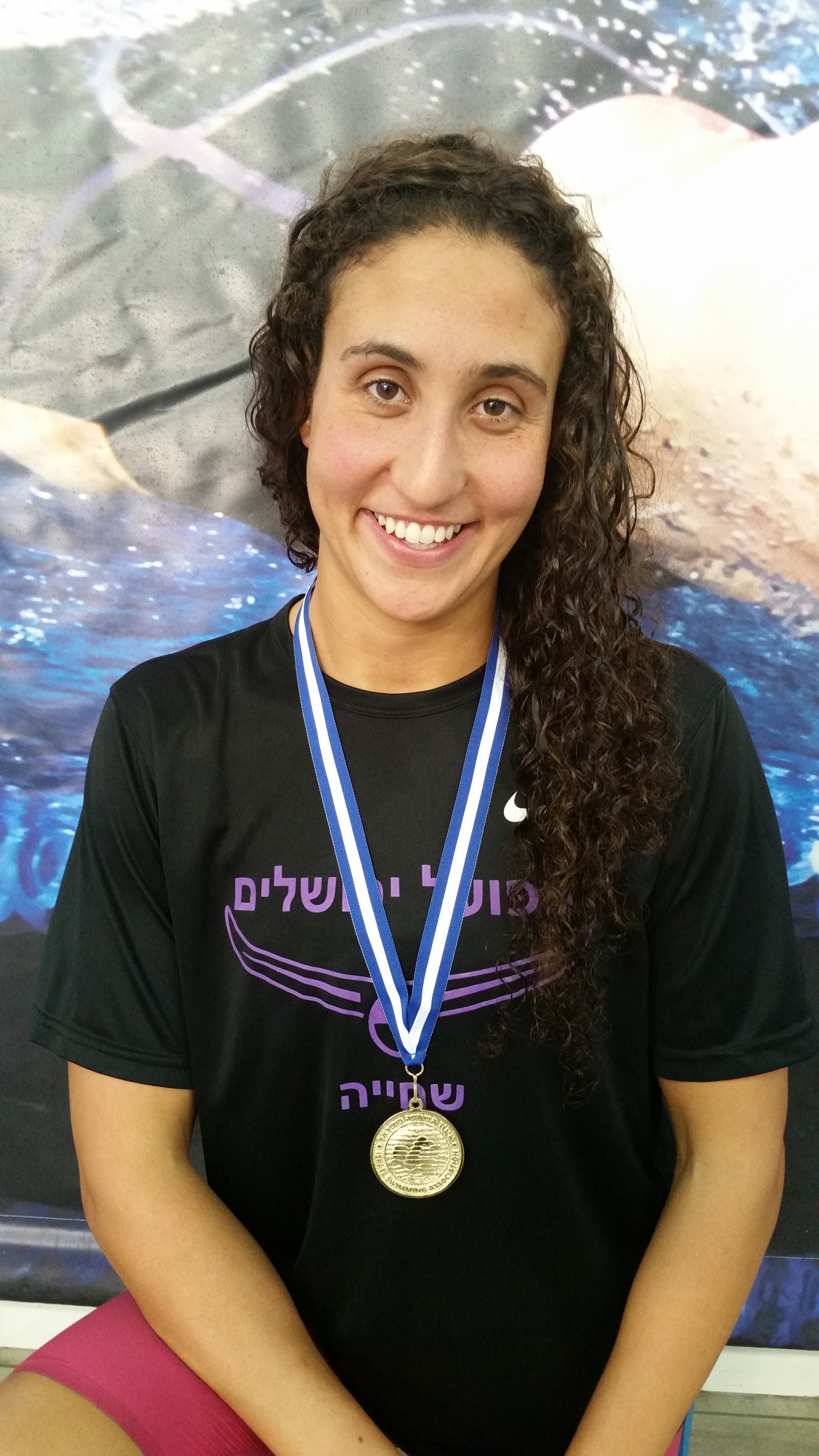
- Murez in 2016

Personal information
- Native name: אנדראה מוּרֶז
- Nickname: Andi
- Nationality: American; Israeli
- Born: 29 January 1992 (age 34) Venice, California, U.S.
- Height: 1.84 m (6 ft 0 in)
- Weight: 77 kg (170 lb)

Sport
- Country: United States (until 2013); Israel (since 2014)
- Sport: Swimming
- Strokes: 50 m freestyle 100 m freestyle 200 m freestyle
- College team: Stanford Cardinal
Medal record
Women's swimming
Representing United States
Universiade
Gold medal – first place	2013 Kazan	4×200 m freestyle
Silver medal – second place	2013 Kazan	4×100 m freestyle
Maccabiah Games
Gold medal – first place	2009 Israel	50 m freestyle
Gold medal – first place	2009 Israel	100 m freestyle
Gold medal – first place	2009 Israel	200 m freestyle
Gold medal – first place	2009 Israel	200 m individual medley
Gold medal – first place	2009 Israel	4 × 100 m freestyle relay
Silver medal – second place	2009 Israel	100 m backstroke
Silver medal – second place	2009 Israel	200 m backstroke
Silver medal – second place	2009 Israel	4 × 100 m medley relay
Silver medal – second place	2009 Israel	4 × 200 m freestyle relay
Gold medal – first place	2013 Israel	100 m freestyle
Representing Israel
European Championships (LC)
Gold medal – first place	2024 Belgrade	4×100 m mixed medley
Gold medal – first place	2024 Belgrade	4×200 m freestyle
Maccabiah Games
Gold medal – first place	2017 Israel	100 m freestyle
Gold medal – first place	2017 Israel	200 m freestyle
Gold medal – first place	2017 Israel	4x100 freestyle

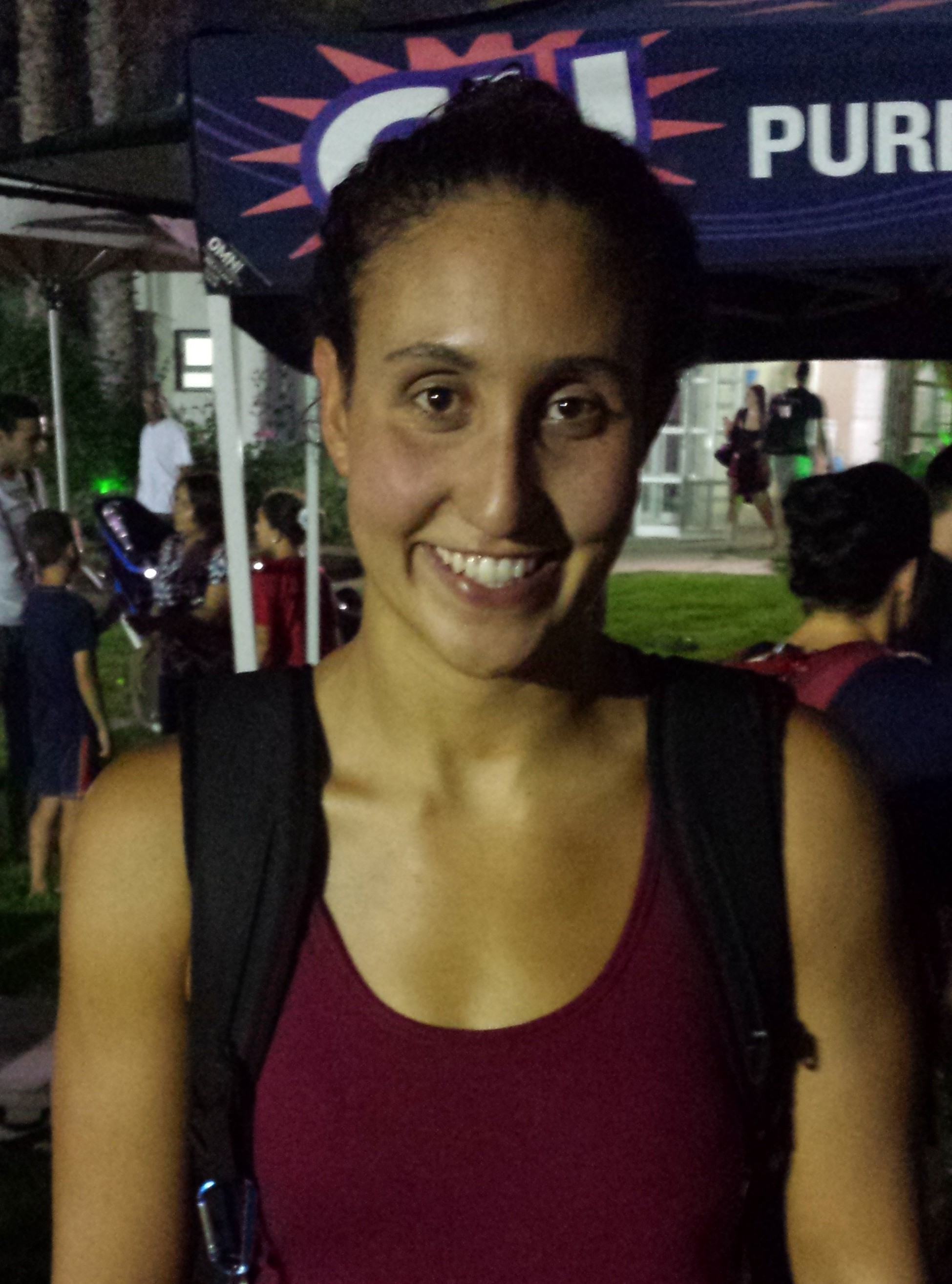
Murez in 2015

Andrea "Andi" Murez (Hebrew: אנדראה "אנדי" מוּרֶז; born 29 January 1992) is an Olympic swimmer. Born in the United States, she represents Israel internationally and competed for her country of birth in the past. She swam for Israel at the 2016 Summer Olympics and the 2020 Summer Olympics. She represented Israel for the third time at the 2024 Paris Olympics where she was one of the flag bearers together with the Olympic judoka Peter Paltchik.

She represented the United States at the 2013 Summer Universiade in Kazan, Russia, where she was a 4 × 200 m freestyle gold medalist and a 4 × 100 m freestyle silver medalist.

Murez is also a Maccabiah Games champion, and Maccabiah record holder, as well as an Israeli national record holder. She has won 17 medals at the Maccabiah Games, 12 of them gold. Murez holds the Israeli national records in the 100 m and 200 m freestyle.

== Early life and education ==
Andrea Murez was born on 29 January 1992, to Melanie (Goodman) Murez, who runs a language translation company (Language.net), and Jim Murez, a computer consultant and contractor who runs the Venice Farmers' Market. Her father also swam competitively in high school and in his freshman year of college. She is Jewish, and was raised in Los Angeles.

Her paternal grandfather, Joe Murez, grew up in pre-WWII Austria on the Danube River, swam competitively for the Jewish Hakoah Vienna Sports Club in the 1930s, and related how during Hitler’s annexation of Austria, Nazis would gather around the pool to beat up Jewish swimmers. He immigrated to the United States in 1938, serving in the U.S. Army Intelligence Corps. He then became one of the largest garlic growers in the world, and ultimately was the one to introduce his granddaughter Andi to swimming.

Her father's stepfather, Raymond Federman, who was also Jewish, was 14 years old when his parents hid him in a small stairway landing closet as Gestapo arrived at the family home in Nazi-occupied France. His family was taken away, and his parents and two sisters were killed in the Auschwitz concentration camp. Federman hid from the Nazis on farms in southern France during the Holocaust. He later became a leading backstroker on the French national team, and emigrated to the U.S. in 1947, where he became an English professor, an expert on author Samuel Beckett, and a novelist.

Murez's brother, Zachary (Zak), who is older than her by three years, set five swim records at Venice High School. He won 10 medals (four of them gold) in the 2003 Pan-American Maccabi Games in Santiago, Chile, and then swam for the Yale University swim team, before studying for a master's degree in computer science at UC San Diego.

Murez attended Venice High School, in Los Angeles, California, graduating in 2009. In high school, she was on the national honor roll. She also attended Hebrew school at Mishkon Tephilo in Venice, Los Angeles.

She attended Stanford University on a swimming scholarship, majoring in human biology, and intends to eventually pursue a career in biology.

Murez immigrated to Israel in 2014. She resides in Netanya, Israel, at the Wingate Institute, with other Israeli swimmers. She is a graduate of Tel Aviv University Medical School.

== Swimming career ==
=== High school ===
Swimming for the Venice High School Gondoliers, Murez won eight City Section individual championships and set four City records. In the Los Angeles City Finals in May 2008, she set the city's record for the 100 freestyle. That year she also qualified for the U.S. Olympic trials. As a senior in the Spring of 2009, Murez won the 100-yard freestyle in a Los Angeles record time of 49.63. She also broke the 200-yard freestyle record, and holds the section records in the 100-yard butterfly and 100-yard backstroke. She was named the team's Most Valuable Player for four years, was team captain her senior year, was an eight-time CIF sectional champion, and set four CIF sectional records.

Murez also swam for the Santa Monica Swim Club Team from 1999 to 2009. The Southern California Jewish Sports Hall of Fame named her the 2010 Female Jewish High School Athlete of the Year.

=== College ===
She swam for the Stanford Cardinal, and was a three-time NCAA All-American. In March 2012 during her junior year, Murez and three Stanford teammates set the U.S. record for the 400-yard freestyle relay (3:10.77) while winning the 2012 NCAA Swimming Championships. They also won the NCAA title in the 200 freestyle relay. In March 2013, at the 2013 Pac-12 Women's Championships, she came in second in the 200 yard freestyle (1:44.42), and third in the 100 yard freestyle (47.86).

Swimming for the United States at the 2013 Summer Universiade in July 2013, she won a gold medal in the Women's 4 × 200 m freestyle relay (7:55.53), a silver medal in the Women's 4 × 100 m freestyle relay (3:38.60), and a bronze medal in the Women's 4 × 100 m medley relay.

=== For Israel ===
Murez was the first Israeli swimmer to finish the 200 m freestyle in less than two minutes.

In the summer of 2015, Murez set the Israeli national record in the long course 200 m freestyle, at 1:59.03. She also set the Israeli national record in the long course 100 m freestyle, at 54.40.

In December 2015, at the 2015 European Short Course Swimming Championships at the Wingate Institute in Netanya, Israel, Murez set a new Israeli record of 1:56.34 in the 200 m, breaking by over two seconds the 4-year-old record that Amit Ivry had set at the 2011 Israeli Winter Championships. She also set a new Israeli record in the 100m freestyle, at 52.88.

In May 2016, Murez competed in the 2016 European Aquatics Championships, placing 5th in the 100 m freestyle (54.89; directly behind the world record holder in the 200 m freestyle, Sarah Sjöström of Sweden), 13th in the 200 m freestyle (1:59.91), and 15th in the 50 m freestyle (25.26).

On 3 July 2024, Murez was designated as Israel's flag bearer at the 2024 Paris Olympics, alongside judoka Peter Paltchik.

=== Maccabiah Games ===
At the 2009 Maccabiah Games in Israel, States Murez won nine medals (five gold and four silver) swimming for the United. She broke all-time Maccabiah Games records while winning gold medals in four individual events: 50 m freestyle (26.44); 100 m freestyle (0:56.44); 200 m freestyle (2:03:45); and 200 m Individual Medley (2:20.74). She set Maccabiah Games records in the 50 m, 100 m, and 200 m freestyle. She earned her 5th gold medal anchoring the USA 4 × 100 m Freestyle Relay team, which set an all-time Maccabiah Games record (3:53:55). Her four silver medals were in the 4 × 200 m freestyle relay, 4 × 100 m Medley Relay, 100 m backstroke, and the 200 m backstroke.

She competed again in the 2013 Maccabiah Games, winning five gold medals (including the 100 m free, in 55.09) and two silver medals while setting a number of swimming records swimming for the United States. She received the 2013 Maccabiah Games Most Outstanding Athlete Award for Women. In total, as of 2013 she had won 15 Maccabiah Games medals, including 10 gold medals.

At the 2017 Maccabiah Games, competing as an Israeli, Murez won the women's 100m freestyle, with a time of 55.15 seconds, and set a new Games record as she also won the 200m freestyle in 1:59.80.

=== Olympics ===
Murez was the first Israeli woman to qualify for the 2016 Summer Olympics, her first Olympic Games. On 17 April 2015, she qualified for the 50-meter freestyle event with a time of 25.12 seconds. Four months later, on 13 August, she qualified for the 100-meter event.

She swam for Israel at the 2016 Summer Olympics. Ill with sinusitis, she withdrew from the 100 m backstroke and 200 m freestyle heats, as she tried to recover in time for the 50 m and 100 m freestyle heats. In the Women's 100 m freestyle heat she came in 30th with a time of 55.47.

== Honors ==
In 2016, Murez was inducted into the Southern California Jewish Sports Hall of Fame.

== See also ==
- List of Israeli records in swimming
- List of Jews in sports

Olympic Games
Preceded by Yakov Toumarkin; Hanna Knyazyeva-Minenko	Flagbearer for Israel; París 2024; With: Peter Paltchik	Succeeded by Incumbent
