= Grigoriy Tarasevich =

Russian swimmer

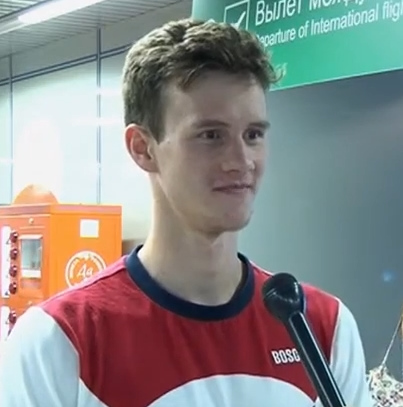
- Tarasevich in 2016

Personal information
- Full name: Grigoriy Arkadyevich Tarasevich
- National team: Russia
- Born: 1 August 1995 (age 31) Omsk, Russia
- Height: 1.90 m (6 ft 3 in)
- Weight: 75 kg (165 lb)

Sport
- Sport: Swimming
- Strokes: Backstroke
- Club: Omsk Regional Centre of Sports Preparation; Cardinal Aquatics
- College team: University of Louisville
- Coach: Arthur Albiero (Louisville)
Medal record
Representing Russia
World Championships (LC)
Bronze medal – third place	2017 Budapest	4×100 m medley
World Championships (SC)
Gold medal – first place	2016 Windsor	4x50 m medley
Gold medal – first place	2016 Windsor	4x100 m medley
European Championships (LC)
Silver medal – second place	2016 London	100 m backstroke
Silver medal – second place	2018 Glasgow	4×100 m mixed medley
Bronze medal – third place	2016 London	50 m backstroke
Summer Universiade
Gold medal – first place	2019 Naples	100 m backstroke
Silver medal – second place	2019 Naples	200 m backstroke
Bronze medal – third place	2019 Naples	50 m backstroke
European Junior Championships
Gold medal – first place	2013 Poznan	50 m backstroke
Gold medal – first place	2013 Poznan	100 m backstroke
Gold medal – first place	2013 Poznan	4x100 m medley
Silver medal – second place	2013 Poznan	200 m backstroke

Grigoriy Arkadyevich Tarasevich (Russian: Григорий Аркадьевич Тарасевич; born 1 August 1995) is a Russian swimmer. In 2013 he won the world junior title in the 50 m backstroke, setting a junior world record.

Tarasevich was born on August 1, 1995 to Arkadiy and Galina Tarasevich in Omsk, Russia in a family of swimming coaches and took up swimming at age six. He attended Grammar School #19 in Omsk. In his youth, and High School years, he trained with the Omsk Regional Centre of Sports Preparation (Russian Federation). In his early career, he earned three European Junior Champion Titles, was a two time Russian Junior National Record Holder, and was crowned 2013's World Junior Champion in the 50- meter backstroke.

He competed in the 50 m, 100 m and 200 m backstroke at the 2016 European Championships and won medals in the 50 m and 100 m, qualifying for the 2016 Summer Olympics in these two events. He placed sixth in the 200 m at the European Championships.

During his College years, he trained in swimming and studied mechanical engineering at the University of Louisville where he swam competitively under Head Coach Arthur Albiero and graduated around 2017. In his Freshman year at Louisville, he was a member of the All-American Conference team for wins in 100- and 200-backstroke events, as well swimming on the 200- and 400-medley relays at the Atlantic Coast Conference Championships. In the 2013–14 season, Coach Albiero brought the Cardinal men and women swim teams to a championship in the first year of the American Athletic Conference.

== 2016, 2020 Olympics ==
At the 2016 Rio de Jainero Olympics, Tarasevich competed in the 100-meter backstroke placing ninth and in the 4x100-meter Men's medley relay placing fourth with a time of 3:31.30, just behind the bronze medal team from Australia.

In the 2020 Tokyo Olympics, Tarasevich competed in the 4x100-meter mixed medley relay team placing 7th overall, and the Men's 4x100-meter medley relay team, placing 4th with a combined time of 3:29.22, just .05 seconds behind the bronze medal team from Italy. In the Men's 200-meter backstroke, Tarasevich placed 12th overall.
