= Dimitrios Chasiotis =

Greek swimmer

Personal information
- Full name: Dimitrios Chasiotis
- National team: Greece
- Born: 27 June 1986 (age 40) Larissa, Greece
- Height: 1.86 m (6 ft 1 in)
- Weight: 80 kg (176 lb)

Sport
- Sport: Swimming
- Strokes: Backstroke
- Club: Olympiakos Athina

Dimitrios Chasiotis (Greek: Δημήτρης Χασιώτης; born June 27, 1986) is a Greek former swimmer, who specialized in backstroke events. He represented Greece at the 2008 Summer Olympics, and also swam for Olympiacos in Athens.

Chasiotis competed as part of the Greek swimming squad in the men's 200 m backstroke at the 2008 Summer Olympics in Beijing. Three months before the Games, he smashed both a national record on a bodysuit and a FINA B-cut of 1:59.95 at the Akropolis Grand Prix in Athens, clipping off a previous standard from Olympian Antonios Gkioulmpas by a few seconds. Chasiotis rounded out the field to last place and thirty-sixth overall in heat three of the evening prelims with 2:02.30, just two seconds slower than his entry time.
