= Aristeidis Grigoriadis =

Greek swimmer (born 1985)

Medal record

Men's swimming

Representing Greece

World Championships (LC)
Gold medal – first place	2005 Montreal	50 m backstroke

European Championships (LC)
Gold medal – first place	2008 Eindhoven	50 m backstroke
Gold medal – first place	2012 Debrecen	100 m backstroke
Silver medal – second place	2006 Budapest	50 m backstroke
Silver medal – second place	2008 Eindhoven	100 m backstroke
Bronze medal – third place	2006 Budapest	100 m backstroke

Mediterranean Games
Gold medal – first place	2005 Almería	50 m backstroke
Gold medal – first place	2005 Almería	100 m backstroke
Silver medal – second place	2009 Pescara	100 m backstroke
Silver medal – second place	2009 Pescara	4x100 m medley
Bronze medal – third place	2005 Almería	4×100 m freestyle
Bronze medal – third place	2009 Pescara	4x100 m freestyle

Aristeidis ("Aris") Grigoriadis (Greek: Άρης Γρηγοριάδης; born 6 December 1985) is a Greek swimmer from Thessaloniki. He was named the 2005 Greek Male Athlete of the Year.

== Career ==
Grigoriadis was the first Greek swimmer to be crowned world champion in the 50 m backstroke event of the 2005 World Championships in Montreal. At the European Championships of Eindhoven in 2008, he won two medals: the gold in 50 m backstroke and the silver in 100 m backstroke.

He participated at the 2012 Olympic Games in the 100 m backstroke event, in which he reached the semifinals, taking the 14th place.
