= Richárd Bohus =

Hungarian swimmer (born 1993)

Personal information
- Nationality: Hungarian
- Born: 9 April 1993 (age 33) Békéscsaba, Hungary
- Height: 1.87 m (6 ft 2 in)
- Weight: 81 kg (179 lb)

Sport
- Sport: Swimming
- Strokes: Backstroke
- Club: Békéscsaba Előre ÚK; BVSC-Zugló
- College team: Arizona State University
Medal record
World Championships
Bronze medal – third place	2017 Budapest	4×100 m freestyle
European Championships (LC)
Silver medal – second place	2016 London	50 m backstroke
Bronze medal – third place	2012 Debrecen	50 m backstroke
Bronze medal – third place	2016 London	4×100 m medley
European Championships (SC)
Silver medal – second place	2019 Glasgow	4×50 m medley
European Junior Championship (LC)
Bronze medal – third place	2011 Belgrade	50 m backstroke

Richárd Bohus (born 9 April 1993) is a Hungarian swimmer. At the 2012 Summer Olympics he finished 22nd overall in the heats in the Men's 100 metre backstroke. Now he trains with Arizona State University.

== Career ==
=== International Swimming League ===
In 2019 Bohus was member of the 2019 International Swimming League representing Team Iron.
