= Jonathan Massacand =

Swiss swimmer (born 1984)

Personal information
- Nationality: Switzerland
- Born: 26 February 1984 (age 42) Morges, Switzerland
- Height: 1.84 m (6 ft 1/2 in)
- Weight: 75 kg (165 lb)

Sport
- Sport: Swimming
- Strokes: Backstroke
- Club: Genève Natation 1885 (SUI)

Jonathan Massacand (born 26 February 1984 in Morges) is a Swiss swimmer, who specialized in backstroke events. He is a two-time current Swiss record holder for both 100 and 200 m backstroke. Massacand also won a gold medal, as a local favorite, in the same discipline at the 2012 Zurich International Meet, claiming a personal best of 56.49 seconds.

Massacand qualified for two swimming events at the 2008 Summer Olympics in Beijing, by clearing FINA B-standard entry times of 55.24 (100 m backstroke) and 2:00.16 (200 m backstroke) from the European Championships in Eindhoven, Netherlands. In the 100 m backstroke, Massacand challenged seven other swimmers on the third heat, including Olympic veterans Derya Büyükuncu of Turkey and Sung Min of South Korea. He finished ahead of Buyukuncu in fifth place and twenty-seventh overall by 0.21 of a second, breaking a Swiss record of 55.21 seconds. In his second event, 200 m backstroke, Massacand knocked off Greece's Dimitrios Chasiotis to last place on the same heat by half a second (0.50) in 2:01.80. His Olympic time in the 200, however, was 1.64 seconds slower than his record set earlier at the European Championships. Massacand failed to advance into the semifinals, as he placed thirty-second overall in the preliminary heats.
