= Pedro Oliveira (swimmer) =

Portuguese swimmer (born 1988)

Personal information
- Full name: Pedro Diogo Tavares Martins de Oliveira
- National team: Portuguese
- Born: 1 January 1988 (age 38) Rio Maior, Portugal
- Height: 1.88 m (6 ft 2 in)
- Weight: 78 kg (172 lb)

Sport
- Sport: Swimming
- Strokes: Butterfly, backstroke
- Club: Clube de Natação de Rio Maior
- College team: University of Louisville (U.S.)
- Coach: Arthur Albiero (Louisville)
Medal record
Men's swimming
Representing Portugal
European Junior Championships
Silver medal – second place	2005 Budapest	200 m backstroke
Silver medal – second place	2006 Palma	200 m backstroke

Pedro Diogo Tavares Martins de Oliveira (born January 1, 1988) is a Portuguese swimmer, who specialized in backstroke and butterfly events. He is a two-time Olympian (2008 and 2012), and a double silver medalist in the 200 m backstroke at the European Junior Championships (2005 and 2006). He also holds four Portuguese records, two national titles, and has produced a stellar performance at the NCAA Swimming Championships, earning five All-American titles as a member of Louisville Cardinals.

== Early years ==
Oliveira, the son of Antonio and Albertina Oliveira, started his sporting career as a member of Rio Maior Swimming Club (Portuguese: Clube de Natação de Rio Maior) under his coach Vladimir Smirnoff. Oliveira competed at the 2005 and 2006 European Junior Swimming Championships in Budapest, Hungary and in Palma de Mallorca, Spain, where he earned two silver medals each in the 200 m backstroke.

== Education ==
After graduating from Augusto Cesar da Silva Ferreira School in Rio Maior, Oliveira accepted an athletic scholarship at the University of Louisville in Louisville, Kentucky, where he majored in exercise science (Human Health and Performance) and swam for the Louisville Cardinals swimming and diving team under head coach Arthur Albiero.

While swimming for the Cardinals, he received five All-American titles, multiple Big East conference individual titles and records, also achieving two school records in the 200 fly and 200 backstroke. Eventually, Oliveira served as the team's co-captain for the 2012 NCAA Men's Swimming and Diving Championships during his last collegiate season, leading the team to their first top 10 finish.

== International career ==
=== 2007 World Championships ===
In 2007, Oliveira made his official debut as a senior swimmer at the FINA World Championships in Melbourne, Australia. He failed to reach the top 8 final in the 200 m backstroke, finishing in fourteenth place with a time of 2:01.18. Earlier in the prelims, Oliveira set a new Portuguese record of 2:00.62 to guarantee a slot for the semifinals.

=== 2008 European Aquatics Championships ===
At the 2008 European Aquatics Championships in Eindhoven, Netherlands, Oliveira experimented with the 200 m butterfly, where he posted a lifetime best of 1:59.00 in his semifinal run, sinking Diogo Carvalho's Portuguese record by 0.67 of a second.

=== 2008 Beijing Olympics ===
Four months later, at the 2008 Summer Olympics in Beijing, Oliveira failed to reach the top 16 in any of his individual events, finishing twenty-fourth (with a new national record) in the 200 m butterfly (1:57.41), and twenty-eighth in the 200 m backstroke (2:01.08).

=== 2009 World Aquatics Championships ===
At the 2009 FINA World Championships in Rome, Italy, Oliveira maintained his official lineup in the program, swimming only in two individual events. In the 200 m butterfly, Oliveira broke a new Portuguese record of 1:56.17 to secure his semifinal spot with an advantage of a polyurethane swimsuit, slashing off Carvalho's standard by a 0.65-second deficit. In his second and final event, 200 m backstroke, Oliveira could not match his stellar performance from the butterfly, finishing thirty-second in the prelims with a time of 2:01.49.

In 2010, Oliveira reached his breakthrough in swimming, when he claimed a 200-metre butterfly title at the USA Swimming Grand Prix in Austin, Texas with a time of 1:59.02. His unexpected triumph from the meet moved him up to sixth in the world rankings.

In 2011, Oliveira decided to skip the World Championships to focus on his swimming career for the Louisville Cardinals. However, he later appeared in a global spotlight after earning a third spot in the 200 m butterfly (1:59.95) at the AT&T Winter National Championships in Atlanta, Georgia. Oliveira also competed for Portugal at the 2011 Summer Universiade in Shenzhen, China, where he placed ninth in the 200 m butterfly at 1:58.50, just missing out the final by a small fraction of a second.

=== 2012 London Olympics ===
At the 2012 Summer Olympics in London, Oliveira competed in the same individual events with only two days in between. He achieved FINA B-standards of 1:59.72 (200 m backstroke) from the European Championships in Debrecen, Hungary, and 1:58.50 (200 m butterfly) from the Summer Universiade in Shenzhen, China. In his first event, 200 m butterfly, Oliveira placed twenty-second on the morning preliminaries. He powered past the entire field to lead the second heat in a personal best time of 1:58.45.

Two days later, in the 200 m backstroke, Oliveira challenged seven other swimmers in the same heat, including Hungary's Gábor Balog, finalist at the European Championships. He set a new Portuguese record of 1:58.83 to earn a second spot behind Balog. Oliveira missed the top 16 semifinals by six-tenths of a second (0.60), as he placed twentieth in the prelims.

=== 2012 European Short Course Swimming Championships ===
Three months after the Olympics, Oliveira placed sixth in the 200 m backstroke at the 2012 European Short Course Swimming Championships in Chartres, France in a Portuguese record of 1:53.06.

== Personal bests ==
As of May 21, 2013.

Long course
Event	Time	Meet
100 m backstroke	55.42	Swimming at Portuguese Long Course Nationals
200 m backstroke	1:58.83	2012 Summer Olympics
100 m butterfly	55.11	2014 Portuguese Long Course Nationals
200 m butterfly	1:56.16	2009 FINA World Championships

Short course
Event	Time	Meet
200 m backstroke	1:53.06	2012 European Championships

== See also ==
- Louisville Cardinals
- List of Portuguese records in swimming
