= Jonatan Kopelev =

Israeli swimmer

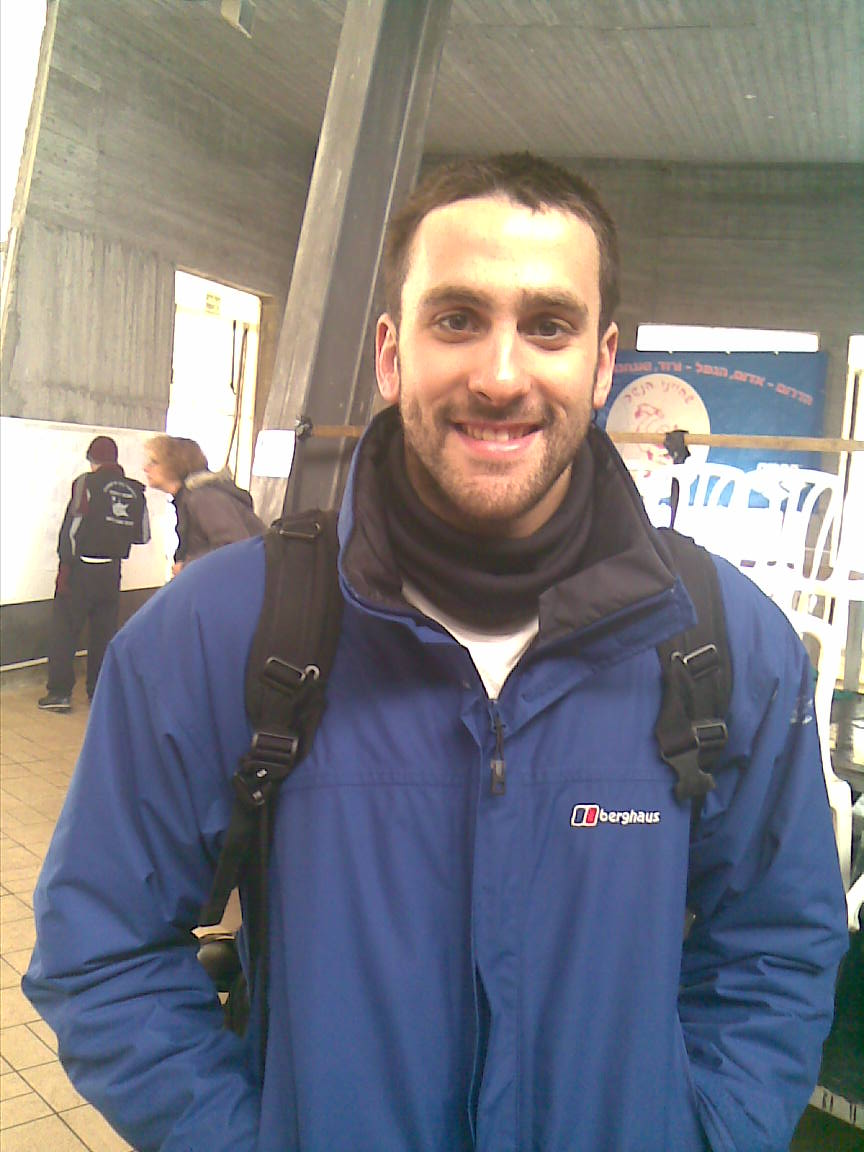

Personal information
- Native name: יהונתן קופלב
- Nickname: Johnny
- Nationality: Israeli
- Born: 1 October 1991 (age 35)
- Height: 1.92 m (6 ft 4 in)

Sport
- Sport: Swimming
- Strokes: Backstroke
- Club: Maccabi Haifa
Medal record
European Championships (LC)
Gold medal – first place	2012 Debrecen	50 m backstroke

Jonatan Kopelev (or Yehonatan, Hebrew: יהונתן קופלב; born 1 October 1991) is an Israeli swimmer. He competes in 100 m backstroke, 200 m backstroke, and 50 m backstroke. He won a gold medal in the 50 m backstroke at the 2012 European Aquatics Championships.

== Early and personal life ==
Kopelev began swimming at age seven, at the Maccabi Haifa Carmel club. He and his wife Monada live in Haifa, Israel.

== Swimming career ==
His club is Maccabi Haifa. Kopelev competes in 100 m backstroke, 200 m backstroke, and 50 m backstroke.

Kopelev won a gold medal in the 50 metre backstroke at the 2012 European Aquatics Championships in Debrecen, Hungary. In doing so he became the first Israeli swimmer to win a gold medal at the European championships. He qualified for the 2012 Olympics, swimming a 54.38 in the 100 m backstroke in a competition in Slovenia in June 2012, but was unable to compete in the Games due to an appendectomy.

Kopelev came in eighth in the men's 50 m backstroke at the 2013 World Aquatics Championships, with a lifetime best of 24.73.

In July 2016 he posted the fastest time in 2016 for the men's 50 m backstroke with a time of 24.60, also setting a new Israeli record.

In December 2018 Kopelev came in second in the 50 S backstroke in the Israel International Arena Winter Championship with a time of 24.25.

Kopelev competed for Israel at the 2019 World Aquatics Championships.

== See also ==
- List of Israeli records in swimming
