= Yoav Gath =

Israeli swimmer (born 1980)

Personal information
- Native name: יואב גת
- Full name: Yoav Gath
- National team: Israel
- Born: November 8, 1980 (age 45) Haifa, Israel

Sport
- Sport: Swimming
- Strokes: Backstroke
- College team: University of Georgia (U.S.)
Medal record
Men's swimming
Representing Israel
European Championships
Bronze medal – third place	Helsinki 2000	200 m backstroke
Short Course European
Silver medal – second place	2001 Antwerp	200 m backstroke

Yoav Gath (Hebrew: יואב גת; born November 8, 1980) is an Olympic and national-record backstroke swimmer from Israel. He swam for Israel at the 2000 Olympics.

Biography

Yoav Gath was born in Haifa. He trained at Hapoel Kiryat-Tivon swimming club coached by Andre Tot. At age 15 he relocated to the Academy for Sport Excellence at the Wingate Institute, coached by Leonid Kaufman and joined Hapoel Jerusalem swimming club.

Yoav won gold 1995 at the European Youth Olympics in Bath in the men's 200-meter backstroke with a time of 2:07.65.

In 1996 he won silver at the European Junior Champs in Copenhagen, Denmark, in the 200 back Long-course, with a time of 2:04.74. His time in the 100 back was 1:00.84.

At the 1997 Maccabiah Games he won gold in the 200 back with new Israeli and Maccabiah records of 2:03.14.

At the European Champs. August 1997 in Seville Spain his times in the 100 and 200 back Long-course were respectively 59.73 and 2:04:95.

1998-99 Yoav trained at the University of Georgia, Athens, GA. At the preliminaries of the NCAA he earned a new Georgia record in 200-yards backstroke 1:42.71, and placed fifth, 1.42.95 at the finals as an All American.

At the European Champs. in Istanbul, Turkey 1999 he finished 4th in the 200 back Long-course with 2:00.72. His time in 100 back was 58.24.

At the 2000 European Champs. Helsinki, Finland he won bronze in 200 back Long-course with a new Israeli record of 2:00.20. His 100 back time was 57:40.

At the 2000 Olympics he made the semifinals in the 200 back with 2:00.20 and placed 16.

At the 2001 World Champs. Fukuoka Japan he placed 8th in the 200 back Long-course with 2:00.09. In the semifinals he was the first Israeli swimmer to go under 2 min with a new Israeli record 1:59:39.

At the 2001 European Champs. Antwerp Belgium Short-course he won silver in the 200 back with a new Israeli record 1:54.15.

At the 2001 World Champs. Short-course Moscow, Russia he placed 6th with 1:54.32. His 100 back time (14th) was 53.42. His 100 individual medley of 57.04 (31st) was a new Israeli record.

At the 2003 World Champs. Barcelona Spain Long-course he finished 10th in 200 back with a new Israeli record of 1:59.22, this record was broken in 2009, after 6 years. In 100 back he finished 15th with 55.71. His time at the preliminaries, 55.41 was one tenth beyond the Israeli national record.

At the 2005 Maccabiah Games Yoav won gold both in 100 and 200 back, the 200 being a new Maccabiah record, 2:02.66.

After the swimming

Yoav received a BSc with distinction in pure mathematics from the Technion, IIT, in 2017. During his graduate studies in the field of Analytic Number Theory he was transferred to a direct PhD track and graduated with a PhD in pure mathematics in 2021. Yoav is married to Michal Gath Morad. She received a BSc in architecture and an MSc Summa Cum Laude in Town planning from the Technion, IIT, and a PhD in Town planning from the Suisse Federal Institute of Technology (ETH).
