= Markus Rogan =

Austrian swimmer

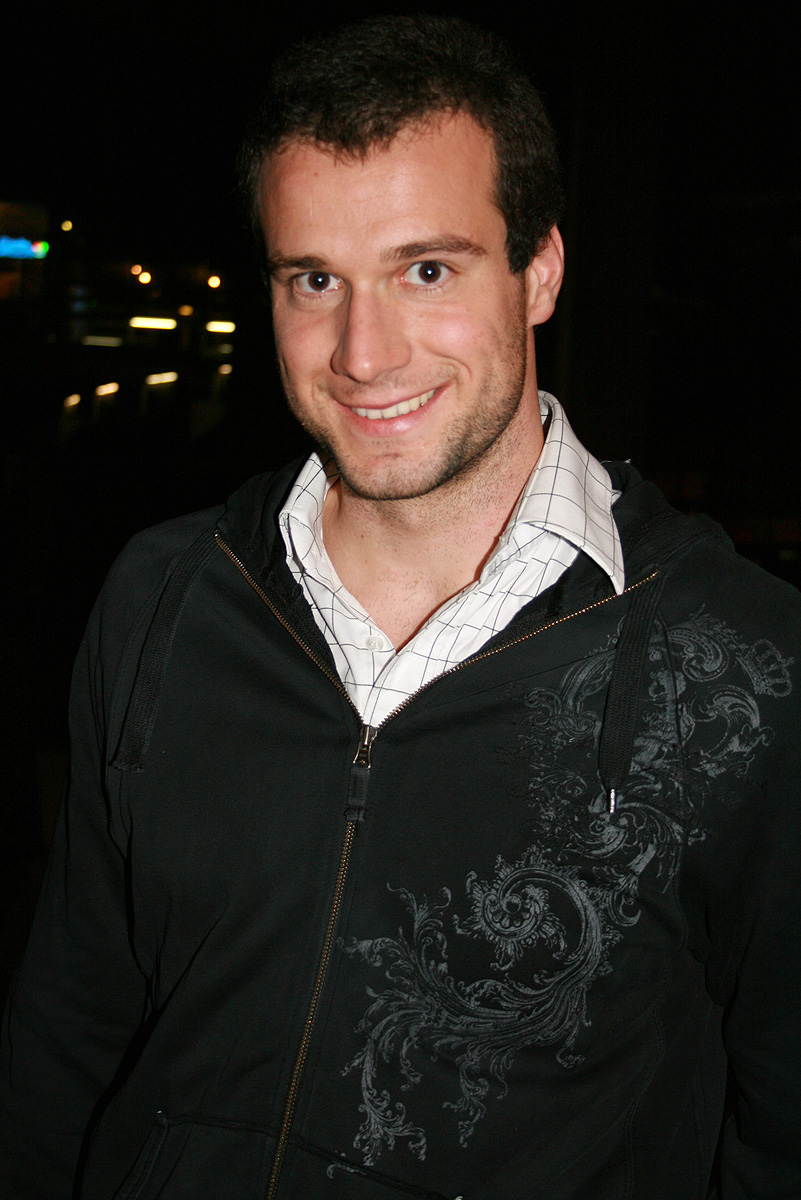
- Rogan in 2008

Personal information
- Full name: Markus Antonius Rogan
- Nationality: Austria
- Born: 4 May 1982 (age 44) Vienna, Austria
- Height: 1.96 m (6 ft 5 in)
- Weight: 93 kg (205 lb)
- Website: MarkusRogan.at

Sport
- Sport: Swimming
- Strokes: Individual Medley, Backstroke
- College team: Stanford Cardinal (USA) (2000–2004)
Medal record
Men's swimming
Representing Austria
Olympic Games
Silver medal – second place	2004 Athens	100 m backstroke
Silver medal – second place	2004 Athens	200 m backstroke
World Championships (LC)
Silver medal – second place	2001 Fukuoka	200 m backstroke
Silver medal – second place	2005 Montreal	200 m backstroke
Bronze medal – third place	2007 Melbourne	200 m backstroke
World Championships (SC)
Gold medal – first place	2008 Manchester	200 m backstroke
Silver medal – second place	2006 Shanghai	100 m backstroke
Silver medal – second place	2006 Shanghai	200 m backstroke
Silver medal – second place	2006 Shanghai	200 m medley
Silver medal – second place	2010 Dubai	200 m medley
Bronze medal – third place	2010 Dubai	200 m backstroke
European Championships (LC)
Gold medal – first place	2004 Madrid	200 m backstroke
Gold medal – first place	2004 Madrid	200 m medley
Gold medal – first place	2008 Eindhoven	100 m backstroke
Gold medal – first place	2008 Eindhoven	200 m backstroke
Silver medal – second place	2002 Berlin	100 m backstroke
Silver medal – second place	2002 Berlin	200 m backstroke
Silver medal – second place	2004 Madrid	100 m backstroke
Silver medal – second place	2006 Budapest	100 m backstroke
Silver medal – second place	2010 Budapest	200 m backstroke
Silver medal – second place	2010 Budapest	200 m medley
Bronze medal – third place	2002 Berlin	200 m medley
Bronze medal – third place	2008 Eindhoven	4×200 m freestyle
Bronze medal – third place	2012 Debrecen	200 m medley
European Championships (SC)
Gold medal – first place	2004 Vienna	200 m backstroke
Gold medal – first place	2004 Vienna	200 m medley
Gold medal – first place	2005 Trieste	200 m backstroke
Gold medal – first place	2007 Debrecen	200 m backstroke
Gold medal – first place	2009 Istanbul	200 m medley
Silver medal – second place	2004 Vienna	100 m backstroke
Silver medal – second place	2004 Vienna	100 m medley
Silver medal – second place	2007 Debrecen	100 m backstroke
Silver medal – second place	2011 Szczecin	200 m medley
Bronze medal – third place	2003 Dublin	200 m backstroke
Universiade
Gold medal – first place	2007 Bangkok	200 m backstroke
Silver medal – second place	2007 Bangkok	100 m backstroke
Bronze medal – third place	2005 Izmir	200 m freestyle

Markus Antonius Rogan (born 4 May 1982 in Vienna) is a retired Austrian swimmer, who won two silver medals at the 2004 Summer Olympics in Athens, Greece and a gold medal for 200 m backstroke at the 2008 World Short Course Championships in Manchester. He also was the world record holder in 200 metres backstroke (short course) in that year.

Rogan's first big international success was a second-place finish in the 200 m backstroke at the 2001 World Championships in Fukuoka, Japan.

In the Olympics in 2004, Rogan placed second in both men's 100 m backstroke and the men's 200 m backstroke, both times behind Aaron Peirsol of the United States. The 200 metre race was controversial as Peirsol was first disqualified but later reinstated as gold medalist. Rogan told Peirsol on television that the result was unfair and that Peirsol should protest.

As a teenager, the 6 ft 5 in tall Rogan swam for Mount Vernon High School in Fairfax County, Virginia, where he trained with the Curl-Burke Swim Club. In July 2000, he cut short his final season of the Northern Virginia Swim League, swimming for the Mansion House Piranhas (of Mount Vernon). He flew to Australia and competed in the 2000 Sydney Olympics, failing to advance beyond the heats in the backstroke.

He earned a scholarship to attend Stanford University from 2000 to 2004. On 8 December 2005, in Trieste, Rogan set a new world record in the 200 m backstroke for short course swim pools, with 1:50.43. This world record was later broken by American swimmer Ryan Lochte. Back on the short course in Short Course World Championships in Manchester, Rogan broke the world record again on 13 April 2008, in a time of 1:47.84, with Lochte finishing second by seven one-hundredths of a second (also under the old world record). Both swimmers were wearing the new Speedo LZR Racer swimsuit.

At the 2008 European Championships in Eindoven, The Netherlands, in March 2008, Rogan told reporters that he was planning to retire after the Beijing Olympics in August. He won both the 100 and 200 metre backstroke events (long course) at those European Championships.

In the meantime, Rogan changed his plans on retirement. He swam at the World Championships in 2009 in Rome. He was training in Italy and wanted to enjoy the home event with his Italian training partners.

At the 2010 European championships he won silver in the 200 m IM behind Olympic Silver medalist László Cseh. Rogan competed in his last Olympic games in London in 2012.

He is now a psychologist working with athletes. He was the director of performance psychology for the Brazilian Olympic Team in Rio de Janeiro, 2016.

In 2020, Markus secretly escaped Israel, after testing positive for COVID-19, breaking the law and resulting in his immediate dismissal from his post as performance psychology coach for the Jewish state’s national soccer team, violating government regulations that prohibit confirmed COVID-19 patients from breaking quarantine, and went to Ben Gurion Airport.

He is married to Leanne Cobb, a marketing executive who was born in South Africa. They live together in Los Angeles, California.

== See also ==
- World record progression 200 metres backstroke

Olympic Games
Preceded by Hans-Peter Steinacher	Flagbearer for Austria; 2012 London	Succeeded by Liu Jia
