= Guy Barnea =

Israeli swimmer (born 1987)

Guy Barnea גיא ברנע
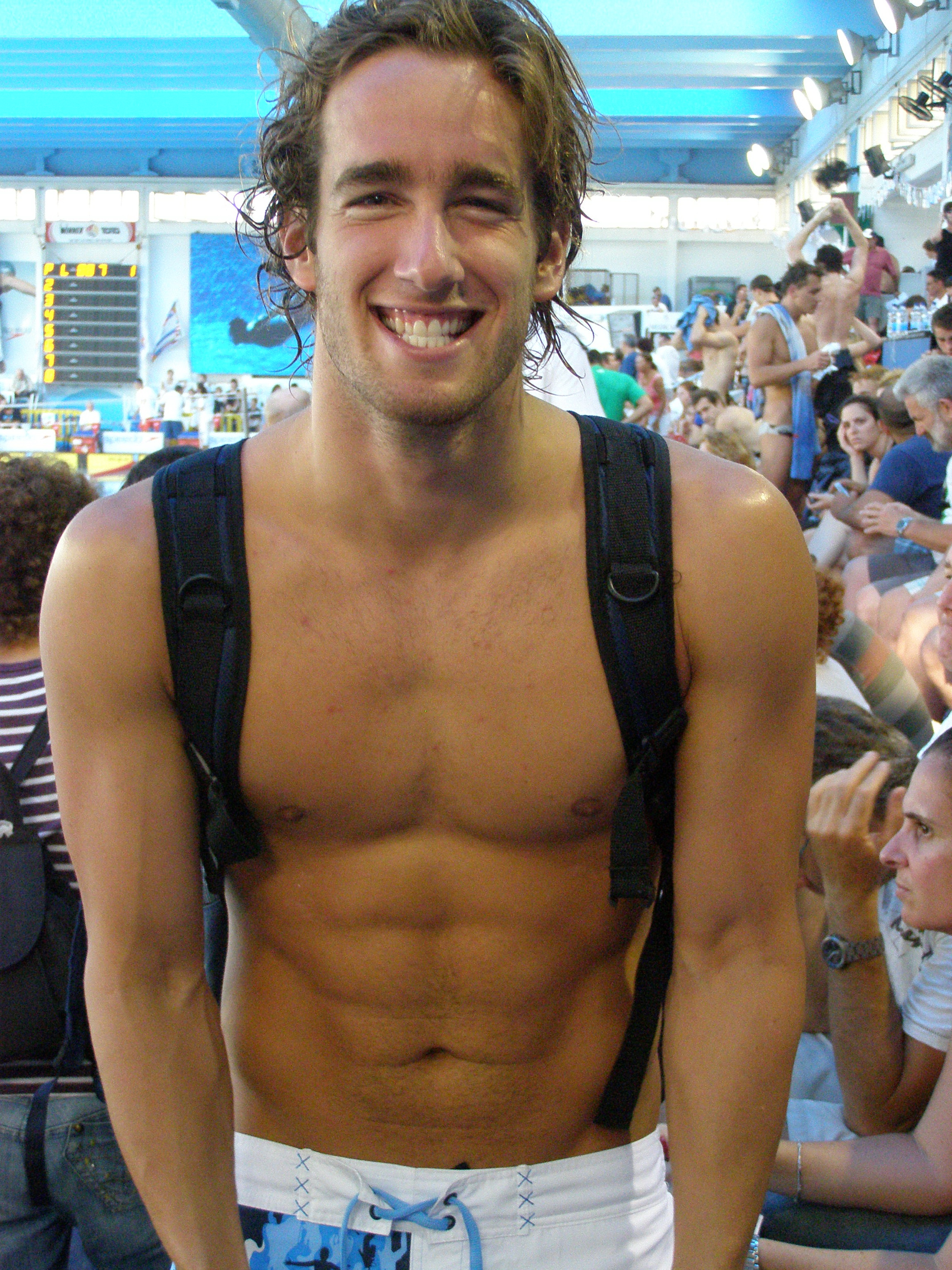

Personal information
- Full name: Guy Marcos Barnea
- Born: 9 September 1987 (age 39) Omer, Israel
- Height: 5 ft 10 in (1.78 m)
- Weight: 161 lb (73 kg)

Sport
- Sport: Swimming
- Club: Hapoel Jerusalem
- College team: University of California, Berkeley
Medal record
European Championships (LC)
Bronze medal – third place	2010 Budapest	50 m backstroke
Bronze medal – third place	2012 Debrecen	50 m backstroke
European Championships (SC)
Silver medal – second place	2012 Chartres	50 m backstroke
Maccabiah Games
Gold medal – first place	2009 Israel	100 m backstroke
Universiade
Silver medal – second place	2011 Shenzhen	50 m backstroke
Bronze medal – third place	2009 Belgrade	50 m backstroke

Guy Marcos Barnea (Hebrew: גיא ברנע; born 9 September 1987) is an Israeli swimmer who represented Israel at the 2008 Summer Olympics, and has won three medals at the European Championships. As of March 2016, he held the Israeli records in the long course 50m backstroke (24.64), the short course 50m backstroke (23.27), and the long course 100m butterfly (51.36).

== Early life ==
Barnea was born and raised in Omer in southern Israel, to Eitan and Rachel Barnea, the oldest of three sons, and his brothers Nir and Or are also swimmers. He began swimming at age six because his parents thought it would help his asthma. For high school he attended Hof Hasharon. He swam for club Hapoel Jerusalem, and was coached by Leonid Kauffman.

== College and swimming career ==
Barnea attended UC Berkeley, where he studied Business Administration and was an All-American for the Golden Bears. He was named First-Team Pac-10 All-Academic in both 2009 and 2010. He was a member of Cal's 2010 NCAA champion 200m free (anchor leg), 200m medley (backstroke leg), and 400m medley (backstroke leg) relay teams. At the 2010 NCAA Swimming Championships, he came in third in the 100m backstroke with a time of 46.23.

Barnea trained at The Race Club, a swim camp in Florida founded by Olympic swimmers Gary Hall, Jr. and his father, Gary Hall, Sr. train elite swimmers across the world in preparation for the 2000 Sydney Olympic Games. To train with it, one must either have been ranked in the world top 20 the prior three years or top three in their nation in the past year.

Barnea competed on behalf of Israel at the 2008 Summer Olympics in Beijing, China. He came in 15th in the Men's 100m backstroke with a time of 54.50.

He won a bronze medal in the 50m backstroke at the 2009 World University Games with a time of 25.09. That year, Barnea set what at the time was the Israeli record in the 50m backstroke, with a time of 24.64. At the 2009 Maccabiah Games, he won a gold medal in the Men's 100m backstroke with a time of 54.22, setting a new Maccabiah Games record and Israeli record.

In 2010, Barnea won the long course European Aquatics Championships bronze medal in the 50m backstroke. He won a silver medal in the 50m backstroke at the 2011 World University Games with a time of 25.21.

In 2012, he won the long course European Aquatics Championships bronze medal in the 50m backstroke again, and a European Short Course Swimming Championships silver medal in the 50m backstroke with an Israeli record time of 23.46.

In August 2014 at the Israeli national swimming championships Barnea won a gold medal in the 50m backstroke with a time of 25.12. At the 2015 European Short Course Swimming Championships in December, he set a new national record of 51.36 in the 100m butterfly.

As of March 2016, he held the Israeli records in the long course 50 backstroke (24.64), the short course 50 backstroke (23.27), and the long course 100 fly (51.36). In August 2016 he won the gold medal at the Eindhoven Swim Cup (Dutch Championships) in the 100m backstroke, with a time of 55.19.

At the 2017 Scottish National Championships, Barnea won the men's 100m backstroke in a time of 54.49, close to his lifetime personal best of 54.29.

At the 2017 Maccabiah Games, in the special 4x50m relay race between Israeli and American all-star teams, American Olympic champions Lenny Krayzelburg (four Olympic golds), Jason Lezak (four Olympic golds), and Anthony Ervin (three Olympic golds), with masters swimmer Alex Blavatnik, swam a time of 1:48.23 and defeated Israeli Olympians Barnea, Yoav Bruck, Eran Groumi, and Tal Stricker, who had a time of 1:51.25.

== See also ==
- List of Israeli records in swimming
