= Itai Chammah =

Israeli swimmer (born 1985)

Itai Chammah איתי צ'מה
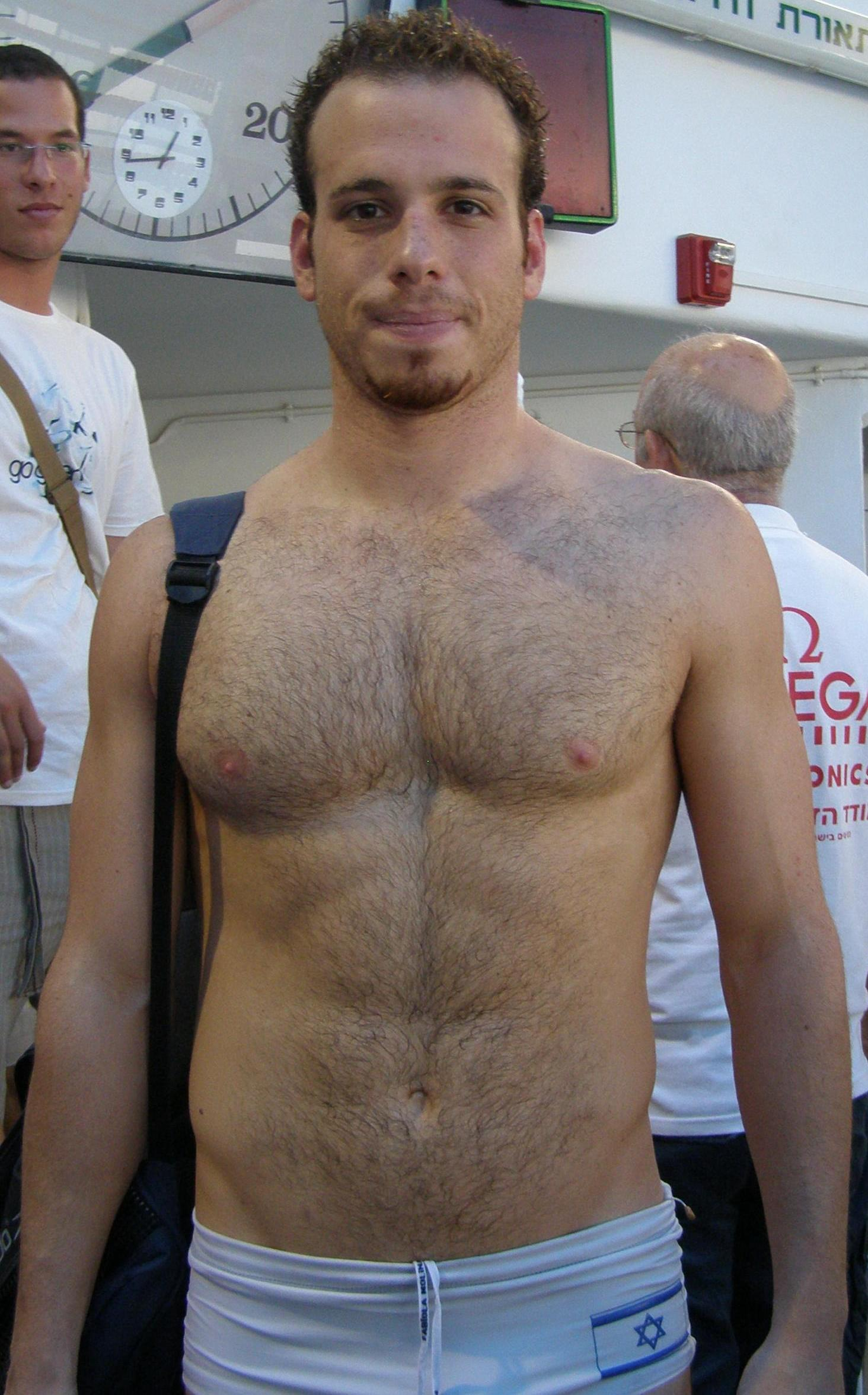

Personal information
- Full name: Itai Chammah
- Nationality: Israeli
- Born: November 11, 1985 (age 40) Yavne, Israel
- Height: 1.83 m (6 ft 0 in)

Sport
- Sport: Swimming
- Club: Maccabi Kiryat Bialik
- College team: Ohio State University
Medal record
Maccabiah Games
Gold medal – first place	2009 Israel	200m backstroke
Bronze medal – third place	2009 Israel	100m backstroke

Itai Chammah (Hebrew: איתי צ'מה; born 11 November 1985 in Yavne) is an Israeli swimmer who represented Israel at the 2008 Summer Olympics.

== Biography ==
Chammah is Jewish.

Chammah competed on behalf of Israel at the 2008 Summer Olympics in Beijing, China.
