= Gregor Tait =

Scottish swimmer

Personal information
- Born: 20 April 1979 (age 47) Glasgow, Scotland
- Height: 1.83 m (6 ft 0 in)

Sport
- Sport: Swimming
- Club: City of Edinburgh
Medal record
Men's swimming
Representing Great Britain
Short Course Europeans
Silver medal – second place	2001 Antwerp	4×50m Medley Relay
Bronze medal – third place	2001 Antwerp	100m backstroke
Representing Scotland
Commonwealth Games
Gold medal – first place	2006 Melbourne	200m backstroke
Gold medal – first place	2006 Melbourne	200m individual medley
Silver medal – second place	2002 Manchester	200 m backstroke
Bronze medal – third place	2006 Melbourne	100m backstroke
Bronze medal – third place	2006 Melbourne	4×100m Medley Relay

Gregor Tait (born 20 April 1979) is a Scottish backstroke swimmer, and an Olympic swimmer for Great Britain. He has swum for Great Britain (or Scotland as noted) at the:

- Olympics: 2004, 2008
- World Championships: 2003, 2005, 2007
- Commonwealth Games (Scotland): 2002, 2006
- Short Course Europeans: 2001, 2003, 2006

At the 2006 Commonwealth Games, he won the Men's 200m Backstroke in a Games Record, and also won the 200m Individual Medley. In addition, Tait also claimed two bronze medals at the 2006 Games. He was hailed as a "national hero" upon his return by Scotland's First Minister, Jack McConnell.

Tait was born in Glasgow. He is married to the Australian Olympic swimmer Alice Mills.

== Personal bests and records held ==
Event	Long course	Short course
50 m backstroke	26.05	24.52
100 m backstroke	54.22	51.88
200 m backstroke	1:56.67	1:51.66
200 m individual medley	2.00.73	
Key NR:British

== See also ==
- Commonwealth Games records in swimming
- List of Commonwealth Games medallists in swimming (men)
