= Swimming at the 2007 World Aquatics Championships – Men's 100 metre breaststroke =

Men's 100 metre breaststroke at the 2007 FINA World Championships
- Venue: Rod Laver Arena
- Dates: 25 March 2007 (heats, semifinals); 26 March 2007 (final)
- Competitors: 123
- Winning time: 59.80 seconds

Medalists
gold medal	Brendan Hansen	United States
silver medal	Kosuke Kitajima	Japan
bronze medal	Brenton Rickard	Australia

The men's 100 metre breaststroke at the 2007 World Aquatics Championships took place on 25 March (heats and semifinals) and on the evening of 26 March (final) at Rod Laver Arena in Melbourne, Australia. 123 swimmers were entered in the event, of which 117 swam.

Existing records at the start of the event were:

- World record (WR): 59.13, Brendan Hansen (USA), 1 August 2006 in Irvine, USA.
- Championship record (CR): 59.37, Brendan Hansen (USA), Montreal 2005 (25 July 2005)

== Results ==
=== Final ===
Place	Lane	Name	Nationality	50m split	Time
	5	Brendan Hansen	USA	27.67	59.80
	4	Kosuke Kitajima	Japan	27.79	59.96
	6	Brenton Rickard	Australia	28.15	1:00.58
4	2	Valeriy Dymo	Ukraine	28.18	1:00.60
5	7	Oleg Lisogor	Ukraine	28.07	1:00.83
6	1	Mihail Alexandrov	Bulgaria	28.09	1:01.17
7	8	Dmitry Komornikov	Russia	28.58	1:01.24
8	3	Alexander Dale Oen	Norway	27.93	1:01.67

=== Semifinals ===
Rank	Heat & Lane	Name	Nationality	50m split	Time	Notes
1	S2-L4	Kosuke Kitajima	Japan	28.31	1:00.05	Q
2	S2-L5	Brendan Hansen	USA	28.09	1:00.13	Q
3	S1-L4	Alexander Dale Oen	Norway	28.52	1:00.69	Q
4	S1-L6	Brenton Rickard	Australia	28.51	1:00.87	Q
5	S2-L6	Valeriy Dymo	Ukraine	28.64	1:00.88	Q
6	S2-L3	Oleg Lisogor	Ukraine	28.86	1:00.89	Q
7	S2-L7	Mihail Alexandrov	Bulgaria	28.33	1:01.08	Q
8	S2-L8	Dmitry Komornikov	Russia	28.87	1:01.11	Q
9	S1-L3	James Gibson	Great Britain	27.95	1:01.24	
9	S1-L7	Scott Usher	USA	29.01	1:01.24	
11	S2-L1	Chris Cook	Great Britain	28.15	1:01.28	
12	S1-L5	Giedrius Titenis	Lithuania	28.82	1:01.48	
13	S1-L8	Roman Sloudnov	Russia	28.69	1:01.50	
14	S1-L2	Cameron van der Burgh	South Africa	28.76	1:01.80	
15	S1-L1	Alessandro Terrin	Italy	28.33	1:01.87	
16	S2-L2	Hugues Duboscq	France	28.80	1:01.93	

=== Heats ===
Rank	Heat & Lane	Name	Nationality	50m split	Time	Note
1	H14-L5	Kosuke Kitajima	Japan	28.33	59.96	Q
2	H15-L5	Alexander Dale Oen	Norway	28.59	1:00.34	Q
3	H16-L4	Brendan Hansen	USA	28.66	1:00.59	Q
4	H09-L4	Giedrius Titenis	Lithuania	28.76	1:00.92	Q
5	H14-L4	Oleg Lisogor	Ukraine	28.83	1:00.99	Q
6	H14-L3	James Gibson	Great Britain	28.26	1:01.03	Q
7	H14-L3	Valeriy Dymo	Ukraine	28.82	1:01.06	Q
7	H15-L4	Brenton Rickard	Australia	28.77	1:01.06	Q
9	H16-L3	Hugues Duboscq	France	28.85	1:01.08	Q
10	H12-L2	Cameron van der Burgh	South Africa	28.73	1:01.12	Q
11	H11-L4	Mihail Alexandrov	Bulgaria	28.60	1:01.15	Q
12	H16-L2	Scott Usher	USA	29.31	1:01.36	Q
13	H16-L6	Chris Cook	Great Britain	29.00	1:01.49	Q
14	H15-L7	Alessandro Terrin	Italy	28.38	1:01.61	Q
15	H14-L2	Dmitry Komornikov	Russia	28.95	1:01.66	Q
16	H16-L5	Roman Sloudnov	Russia	29.09	1:01.69	Q (swim-off)
16	H15-L8	Robin van Aggele	Netherlands	28.67	1:01.69	(swim-off)
18	H16-L1	Mike Brown	Canada	29.13	1:01.75	
19	H12-L4	Glenn Snyders	New Zealand	29.36	1:01.91	
20	H11-L3	Jiri Jedlicka	Czech Republic	29.23	1:01.92	
21	H16-L7	Edoardo Giorgetti	Italy	29.78	1:01.95	
22	H15-L6	Makoto Yamashita	Japan	29.12	1:02.08	
23	H14-L8	Henrique Barbosa	Brazil	28.81	1:02.13	
24	H13-L1	LAI Zhongjian	China	29.62	1:02.18	
25	H15-L1	Valentin Preda	Romania	28.74	1:02.19	
26	H15-L2	Richárd Bodor	Hungary	29.20	1:02.28	
27	H13-L2	Jim Piper	Australia	29.06	1:02.36	
28	H14-L1	Johannes Neumann	Germany	29.11	1:02.50	
29	H13-L8	Sławomir Wolniak	Poland	29.06	1:02.50	
30	H14-L7	Felipe Lima	Brazil	29.23	1:02.58	
31	H12-L5	Maxim Podoprigora	Austria	29.76	1:02.71	
31	H12-L8	Thabang Moeketsane	South Africa	29.05	1:02.71	
33	H11-L5	Mladen Tepavčević	Serbia	29.42	1:02.80	
33	H13-L4	Sławomir Kuczko	Poland	29.81	1:02.80	
35	H12-L1	Chris Boe Christensen	Denmark	29.84	1:02.83	
36	H16-L8	Emil Tahirovič	Slovenia	28.52	1:02.85	
37	H13-L6	Jakob Jóhann Sveinsson	Iceland	29.47	1:02.91	
38	H11-L6	Edvinas Dautartas	Lithuania	29.07	1:03.07	
39	H10-L6	Sofiane Daid	Algeria	29.31	1:03.09	
40	H12-L6	Dániel Gyurta	Hungary	30.13	1:03.33	
41	H13-L5	WANG Haibo	China	29.99	1:03.38	
42	H12-L7	Malick Fall	Senegal	29.62	1:03.42	
43	H10-L7	Tomas Fucik	Czech Republic	29.59	1:03.44	
44	H15-L3	Romanos Iasonas Alyfantis	Greece	29.40	1:03.51	
45	H11-L2	Mikalai Vasilyeu	Belarus	29.61	1:03.62	
46	H12-L3	Yevgeniy Ryzhkov	Kazakhstan	29.99	1:03.70	
47	H10-L2	Tom Be'eri	Israel	30.07	1:03.72	
47	H10-L1	Michael Malul	Israel	29.65	1:03.72	
49	H11-L8	Alwin de Prins	Luxembourg	29.69	1:04.00	
50	H11-L7	Martti Aljand	Estonia	30.31	1:04.13	
51	H13-L7	Matjaž Markič	Slovenia	28.96	1:04.20	
52	H09-L3	Sujong Sin	South Korea	30.46	1:04.31	
53	H10-L3	Hsin Hung Chiang	Chinese Taipei	30.25	1:04.49	
54	H09-L6	Dean Kent	New Zealand	30.20	1:04.51	
55	H10-L4	Nikola Delic	Croatia	29.68	1:04.58	
56	H9-L5	Andrei Capitanciuc	Moldova	30.24	1:04.76	
57	H10-L8	Dimitri Waeber	Switzerland	29.88	1:04.80	
58	H07-L6	Wael Koubrously	Lebanon	30.66	1:04.83	
59	H08-L1	Vidvuds Maculevics	Latvia	30.17	1:05.36	
60	H11-L1	Wei Wen Wang	Chinese Taipei	30.79	1:05.38	
61	H09-L7	Sergiu Postica	Moldova	30.24	1:05.45	
62	H09-L2	Mohammad Alirezaei	Iran	29.99	1:05.64	
63	H07-L3	Radomyos Matjiur	Thailand	30.65	1:05.70	
64	H08-L2	Diego Bonilla	Colombia	30.79	1:05.75	
65	H09-L8	Herry Yudhianto	Indonesia	31.39	1:05.81	
66	H09-L1	Andrei Cross	Barbados	29.91	1:05.91	
67	H08-L4	Edgar Robert Crespo	Panama	31.08	1:06.00	
68	H07-L4	Rainui Terupaia	Tahiti	30.37	1:06.10	
69	H08-L5	Jin Leonard Tan	Singapore	30.75	1:06.14	
70	H08-L6	Andrey Morkovin	Uzbekistan	31.36	1:06.46	
70	H08-L7	Billy Arfianto	Indonesia	31.70	1:06.46	
72	H10-L5	Kirils Sanzarovecs	Latvia	30.54	1:06.65	
73	H07-L1	Kevin Hensley	(United States Virgin Islands) Virgin Islands	30.56	1:06.86	
74	H06-L7	Josh Laban	(United States Virgin Islands) Virgin Islands	31.66	1:07.28	
75	H08-L3	Gerard Bordado	Philippines	31.12	1:07.37	
76	H08-L8	Kee Guan Benjamin Ng	Singapore	31.36	1:07.92	
77	H06-L5	Milan Glamocic	Bosnia and Herzegovina	31.50	1:07.99	
78	H07-L7	Yusuf Alyousuf	Saudi Arabia	31.97	1:08.22	
79	H07-L2	Mustafa Al-Saleh	Syria	32.17	1:08.34	
80	H07-L8	See Tuan Yap	Malaysia	31.78	1:08.39	
81	H06-L8	Eric Williams	Nigeria	31.94	1:08.77	
82	H07-L5	Genaro Mathias Prono Britez	Paraguay	31.56	1:08.89	
83	H06-L6	Erik Rajohnson	Madagascar	32.70	1:09.01	
84	H06-L4	Antonio Leon Candia	Paraguay	31.11	1:09.32	
85	H05-L4	Amar Shah	Kenya	31.53	1:09.67	
86	H04-L5	Celestino Aguon	Guam	32.88	1:10.46	
87	H06-L2	Chisela Kanchela	Zambia	32.01	1:10.64	
88	H05-L3	Melvin Chua	Malaysia	33.04	1:10.65	
89	H04-L4	Hei Ming Lao	Macau	33.01	1:10.84	
90	H03-L4	Boldbaataryn Bütekh-Uils	Mongolia	32.50	1:11.06	
91	H05-L1	Rodion Davelaar	Netherlands Antilles	33.59	1:11.38	
92	H04-L7	Omar Jasim	Brunei	32.38	1:11.38	
93	H05-L5	Alexander Rivero	Bolivia	32.49	1:11.62	
94	H06-L1	Osama Al Araj	Qatar	32.92	1:11.73	
95	H05-L7	Aram Nazaryan	Armenia	33.18	1:12.21	
96	H05-L8	Jehad Al Henidi	Jordan	33.13	1:12.72	
97	H04-L8	Guvanch Ataniyazov	Turkmenistan	33.67	1:13.12	
98	H04-L1	Eric Artur Medina Su	Panama	33.86	1:13.17	
99	H05-L2	Onan Thom	Guyana	34.20	1:13.62	
100	H04-L6	Kevin Cheung	Mauritius	34.05	1:13.87	
101	H04-L2	Gavin Sants	Gibraltar	34.69	1:13.88	
102	H05-L6	Jamie Zammitt	Gibraltar	33.91	1:14.43	
103	H02-L3	A. Aldhaheri	United Arab Emirates	35.72	1:15.93	
104	H03-L6	Eli Ebenezer Wong	Northern Mariana Islands	35.72	1:15.95	
105	H03-L2	Julio Smith	Seychelles	34.48	1:16.55	
106	H03-L3	Sadeq Damrah	Palestine	34.92	1:16.60	
107	H03-L1	Hassan Ashraf	Maldives	35.15	1:17.26	
108	H03-L8	Michael Taylor	Marshall Islands	36.22	1:17.79	
109	H03-L5	Monder Al-Jabali	Libya	35.89	1:20.40	
110	H02-L6	Rahim Karmali	Uganda	37.32	1:21.27	
111	H01-L5	Jackson Niyomugabo	Rwanda	39.45	1:25.87	
112	H02-L8	Anthony Kpetnky	Ghana	33.86	1:29.60	
113	H01-L3	Seele Benjamin Ntai	Lesotho	42.54	1:31.58	NR
114	H01-L4	Boipelo Makhothi	Lesotho	42.16	1:32.63	
115	H02-L1	Vincent Leatualevao	American Samoa	41.39	1:32.86	
116	H02-L5	Robert Scanlan	American Samoa	41.55	1:34.98	
117	H02-L4	Abubakarr Jalloh	Sierra Leone	45.22	1:44.93	
	H02-L2	M. Alhousseini Alhassan	Niger		DNS	
	H02-L7	Julio Yao Bessan	Benin		DNS	
	H03-L7	Thi Hue Pham	Vietnam		DNS	
	H04-L3	João Aguiar	Angola		DNS	
	H06-L3	Shajahan Ali Rony	Bangladesh		DNS	
	H13-L3	Vanja Rogulj	Croatia		DNS	

==== Swim-off for semis (16th place) ====
1. Roman Sloudnov, Russia – 1:01.97 (Q)
2. Robin van Aggele, Netherlands – 1:02.54

== See also ==
- Swimming at the 2005 World Aquatics Championships – Men's 100 metre breaststroke (previous Worlds)
- Swimming at the 2008 Summer Olympics – Men's 100 metre breaststroke (next year's top event)
- Swimming at the 2009 World Aquatics Championships – Men's 100 metre breaststroke (next Worlds)
