= Swimming at the 2003 World Aquatics Championships – Men's 100 metre breaststroke =

Men's 100m Breastroke at the 2003 FINA World Aquatics Championships
- Dates: 20 July (prelims & semifinals); 21 July (final)
- Winning time: 59.78 seconds WR

Medalists
gold medal	Kosuke Kitajima	Japan
silver medal	Brendan Hansen	United States
bronze medal	James Gibson	Great Britain

The Men's 100 Breaststroke event at the 10th FINA World Aquatics Championships swam on 20–21 July 2003 in Barcelona, Spain. Preliminary and Semifinal heats swam on 20 July, with the Final on 21 July.

At the start of the event, the existing World (WR) and Championship (CR) records were both:

- WR & CR: 59.94 swum by Roman Sloudnov (Russia) on 23 July 2001 in Fukuoka, Japan

== Results ==
=== Final ===
Place	Swimmer	Nation	Time	Notes
1	Kosuke Kitajima	Japan	59.78	WR
2	Brendan Hansen	USA	1:00.21	
3	James Gibson	Great Britain	1:00.37	
4	Ed Moses	USA	1:00.87	
5	Morgan Knabe	Canada	1:01.07	
6	Domenico Fioravanti	Italy	1:01.23	
7	Darren Mew	Great Britain	1:01.36	
8	Hugues Duboscq	France	1:01.48	

=== Semifinals ===
Rank	Heat + Lane	Swimmer	Nation	Time	Notes
1	S2 L4	Kosuke Kitajima	Japan	59.98	q
2	S1 L4	James Gibson	Great Britain	1:00.47	q
3	S1 L6	Ed Moses	USA	1:00.77	q
4	S2 L6	Brendan Hansen	USA	1:00.83	q
5	S1 L5	Hugues Duboscq	France	1:00.98	q
6	S2 L5	Morgan Knabe	Canada	1:01.05	q
7	S1 L8	Domenico Fioravanti	Italy	1:01.46	q
8	S2 L1	Darren Mew	Great Britain	1:01.60	q
9	S1 L3	Oleg Lisogor	Ukraine	1:01.65	q
10	S2 L3	Brenton Rickard	Australia	1:01.77	q
11	S2 L2	Roman Ivanovski	Russia	1:01.93	q
12	S1 L7	Martin Gustavsson	Sweden	1:01.94	q
13	S1 L1	Mike Brown	Canada	1:02.06	q
13	S2 L8	Emil Tahirovič	Slovenia	1:02.06	q
15	S1 L2	Jarno Pihlava	Finland	1:02.18	q
16	S2 L7	Mark Warnecke	Germany	1:02.44	q

=== Preliminaries ===
Rank	Heat+Lane	Swimmer	Nation	Time	Notes
1	H13 L4	Kosuke Kitajima	Japan	1:00.20	q
2	H13 L5	James Gibson	Great Britain	1:00.74	q
3	H11 L5	Morgan Knabe	Canada	1:01.19	q
4	H12 L3	Hugues Duboscq	France	1:01.35	q
5	H11 L1	Brenton Rickard	Australia	1:01.37	q
6	H11 L4	Oleg Lisogor	Ukraine	1:01.40	q
7	H12 L5	Brendan Hansen	United States	1:01.47	q
8	H12 L4	Ed Moses	United States	1:01.51	q
9	H11 L2	Roman Ivanovski	Russia	1:01.78	q
10	H11 L3	Jarno Pihlava	Finland	1:01.79	q
11	H09 L1	Mark Warnecke	Germany	1:01.86	q
12	H13 L7	Martin Gustavsson	Sweden	1:01.90	q
13	H13 L3	Darren Mew	Great Britain	1:01.96	q
14	H12 L1	Mike Brown	Canada	1:02.00	q
15	H11 L8	Emil Tahirovič	Slovenia	1:02.14	q
16	H09 L4	Domenico Fioravanti	Italy	1:02.28	q
17	H13 L6	Károly Güttler	Hungary	1:02.35	
18	H11 L6	Richárd Bodor	Hungary	1:02.37	
19	H10 L5	Morten Nystrøm	Norway	1:02.50	
20	H12 L7	Reiner Schneider	Germany	1:02.54	
21	H12 L6	Dmitry Komornikov	Russia	1:02.57	
22	H09 L8	Daniel Málek	Czech Republic	1:02.78	
23	H10 L4	Eduardo Fischer	Brazil	1:02.80	
24	H09 L7	Davide Rummolo	Italy	1:02.82	
25	H11 L7	Regan Harrison	Australia	1:02.84	
26	H10 L1	Remo Lütolf	Switzerland	1:02.86	
27	H13 L2	Thijs van Valkengoed	Netherlands	1:02.95	
28	H10 L8	Maxim Podoprigora	Austria	1:02.97	
29	H08 L5	Sofiane Daid	Algeria	1:03.01	
30	H10 L2	Mladen Tepavčević	FR Yugoslavia	1:03.09	
31	H08 L4	Jakob Sveinsson	Iceland	1:03.11	
32	H09 L5	Chris Stewart	South Africa	1:03.12	
33	H13 L1	Vlad Polyakov	Kazakhstan	1:03.19	
34	H08 L3	Valeriy Dymo	Ukraine	1:03.29	
35	H09 L6	Henrique Barbosa	Brazil	1:03.36	
36	H13 L8	Yohan Bernard	France	1:03.45	
37	H09 L2	Alwin de Prins	Luxembourg	1:03.59	
38	H12 L8	Vanja Rogulj	Croatia	1:03.60	
39	H08 L6	Matjaž Markič	Slovenia	1:03.65	
40	H09 L3	Malick Fall	Senegal	1:03.66	
41	H10 L6	Andrew Bree	Ireland	1:03.73	
42	H07 L2	Christopher Hansen	Norway	1:03.83	
43	H10 L3	Haibo Wang	China	1:04.14	
44	H08 L7	Wickus Nienaber	Swaziland	1:04.22	
45	H10 L7	Qiliang Zeng	China	1:04.23	
46	H07 L3	Vladimir Labzin	Estonia	1:04.79	
47	H08 L2	Arsenio López	Puerto Rico	1:05.23	
48	H07 L7	Raphael Matthew Chua	Philippines	1:05.35	
49	H02 L8	Francisco Suriano	El Salvador	1:05.42	
50	H06 L4	Seung Hun You	South Korea	1:05.58	
51	H07 L4	Álvaro Fortuny	Guatemala	1:05.71	
52	H06 L7	Ranui Teriipaia	Tahiti	1:05.88	
53	H06 L3	Jon Oddur Sigurdsson	Iceland	1:05.91	
54	H08 L1	Oleg Sidorov	Uzbekistan	1:06.03	
55	H06 L5	Andrei Capitanciuc	Moldova	1:06.08	
56	H07 L5	Chi Kin Tam	Hong Kong	1:06.38	
57	H06 L6	Grant Galant	South Africa	1:07.05	
58	H05 L4	Hocine Haciane	Andorra	1:07.06	
59	H06 L1	Jean-Luc Razakarivony	Madagascar	1:07.25	
59	H07 L1	Sergey Voytsekhovich	Uzbekistan	1:07.25	
61	H05 L5	Santiago Cavanagh	Bolivia	1:07.89	
62	H07 L6	Ahmed Al-Kudmani	Saudi Arabia	1:08.14	
63	H05 L8	Nam Nguyen Thanh	Vietnam	1:08.60	
64	H05 L2	Kevin Hensley	Virgin Islands	1:08.73	
65	H04 L5	Conrad Francis	Sri Lanka	1:08.83	
66	H05 L3	Baktash Gheidi	Iran	1:08.88	
67	H05 L7	Chan Wai Ma	Macau	1:09.15	
68	H06 L8	Antonio Leon	Paraguay	1:09.45	
69	H04 L6	Eric Williams	Nigeria	1:09.66	
70	H04 L1	Chisela Kanchela	Zambia	1:09.72	
71	H06 L2	Cheuk Lun Li	Hong Kong	1:09.74	
72	H04 L7	Hei Meng Lao	Macau	1:10.28	
73	H04 L2	Onan Thom	Guyana	1:10.51	
74	H05 L6	Marc Dansou	Benin	1:10.83	
75	H03 L4	Amar Shah	Kenya	1:11.14	
76	H03 L5	O. Igbekele Ayenuwa	Nigeria	1:11.31	
77	H03 L6	Joao Matias	Angola	1:12.64	
78	H05 L1	Jamie Peterkin	Saint Lucia	1:12.80	
79	H04 L4	Daniel Kang	Guam	1:13.73	
80	H02 L4	Omar Jasim	Bahrain	1:15.01	
81	H03 L2	Alice Shrestha	Nepal	1:16.49	
82	H03 L8	Guvanch Ataniyazov	Turkmenistan	1:16.99	
83	H02 L3	Peter James Linch	Zambia	1:18.24	
84	H02 L5	Issam Halawani	Palestine	1:18.39	
85	H04 L8	Iyad Houseya	Palestine	1:20.34	
86	H01 L3	Ronald Ying	Guyana	1:21.41	
87	H04 L3	Ganzi Mugula	Uganda	1:21.76	
88	H02 L6	Stephenson Wallace	Saint Vincent and the Grenadines	1:23.56	
89	H02 L2	Donnie Defreitas	Saint Vincent and the Grenadines	1:24.51	
90	H02 L1	Lamine Alhousseini	Niger	1:26.21	
91	H02 L7	Dawson Grace	Samoa	1:27.16	
92	H01 L4	Joshua Marfleet	Samoa	1:31.59	
–	H03 L1	Enkhmandakh Khurlee	Mongolia	DQ	
–	H08 L8	Juan José Madrigal	Costa Rica	DQ	
–	H12 L2	Makoto Yamashita	Japan	DQ	
–	–	Mihail Alexandrov	Bulgaria	DNS	
–	–	Ahmed Ouattara Zie	Ivory Coast	DNS	
–	–	Ben Traore	Ivory Coast	DNS	
–	–	A.A. Romain Belemtougri	Burkina Faso	DNS	
