= Swimming at the 2005 World Aquatics Championships – Men's 100 metre breaststroke =

Men's 100m Breaststroke at the 2005 World Aquatics Championships
- Dates: 24 July (prelims, semifinals), 25 July (final)
- Competitors: 93 from 68 nations
- Winning time: 59.37 seconds

Medalists
gold medal	Brendan Hansen	United States
silver medal	Kosuke Kitajima	Japan
bronze medal	Hugues Duboscq	France

The Men's 100 Breaststroke event at the 11th FINA World Aquatics Championships swam 24 and 25 July 2005 in Montreal, Canada. Preliminary and semifinal heats were swum 24 July; finals on July 25.

At the start of the event, the existing World (WR) and Championships (CR) records were:

- WR: 59.30 swum by Brendan Hansen (USA) on July 8, 2004, in Long Beach, USA
- CR: 59.78 swum by Kosuke Kitajima (Japan) on July 21, 2003, in Barcelona, Spain

== Results ==
=== Final ===
Place	Swimmer	Nation	Time	Notes
1	Brendan Hansen	United States	59.37	CR
2	Kosuke Kitajima	Japan	59.53	
3	Hugues Duboscq	France	1:00.20	
4	Oleg Lisogor	Ukraine	1:00.36	
5	Dmitry Komornikov	Russia	1:00.66	
6	Chris Cook	United Kingdom	1:00.99	
7	Alexander Dale Oen	Norway	1:01.29	
8	Emil Tahirovič	Slovenia	1:01.33	

=== Semifinals ===
Rank	Heat/Lane	Swimmer	Nation	Time	Notes
1	S1 L4	Brendan Hansen	USA	59.75	q
2	S2 L4	Kosuke Kitajima	Japan	59.78	q
3	S2 L3	Oleg Lisogor	Ukraine	1:00.06	q
4	S2 L5	Hugues Duboscq	France	1:00.11	q
5	S1 L5	Chris Cook	Great Britain	1:00.64	q
6	S1 L3	Emil Tahirovič	Slovenia	1:00.84	q
7	S2 L2	Alexander Dale Oen	Norway	1:01.28	q
8	S1 L2	Dmitry Komornikov	Russia	1:01.30	q
9	S1 L8	Mark Gangloff	USA	1:01.35	
10	S1 L7	Brenton Rickard	Australia	1:01.51	
11	S2 L6	Mike Brown	Canada	1:01.59	
12	S2 L1	Jarno Pihlava	Finland	1:01.60	
13	S1 L6	Genki Imamura	Japan	1:01.64	
14	S2 L7	Jim Piper	Australia	1:01.67	
15	S2 L8	Vlad Polyakov	Kazakhstan	1:01.70	
16	S1 L1	Jens Kruppa	Germany	1:01.92	

=== Preliminaries ===
Rank	Heat/Lane	Swimmer	Nation	Time	Notes
1	H12 L3	Kosuke Kitajima	Japan	59.71	q, CR
2	H12 L4	Brendan Hansen	United States	59.84	q
3	H10 L5	Hugues Duboscq	France	1:00.05	q
4	H10 L6	Chris Cook	Great Britain	1:00.86	q
5	H11 L3	Oleg Lisogor	Ukraine	1:01.05	q
6	H11 L7	Emil Tahirovič	Slovenia	1:01.29	q
7	H12 L1	Mike Brown	Canada	1:01.30	q
8	H12 L2	Genki Imamura	Japan	1:01.37	q
9	H9 L6	Alexander Dale Oen	Norway	1:01.50	q
10	H10 L4	Dmitry Komornikov	Russia	1:01.54	q
10	H12 L7	Jim Piper	Australia	1:01.54	q
12	H11 L4	Brenton Rickard	Australia	1:01.57	q
13	H10 L1	Jarno Pihlava	Finland	1:01.64	q
14	H11 L8	Jens Kruppa	Germany	1:01.78	q
15	H10 L3	Vlad Polyakov	Kazakhstan	1:01.83	q
16	H12 L5	Mark Gangloff	United States	1:01.90	q
17	H10 L7	Valeriy Dymo	Ukraine	1:01.93	
18	H12 L8	Scott Dickens	Canada	1:02.00	
19	H11 L6	Alessandro Terrin	Italy	1:02.01	
19	H12 L6	Grigory Falko	Russia	1:02.01	
21	H8 L4	Matjaž Markič	Slovenia	1:02.03	
22	H9 L4	Sławomir Kuczko	Poland	1:02.13	
23	H9 L5	Martin Gustavsson	Sweden	1:02.19	
24	H11 L2	Richárd Bodor	Hungary	1:02.23	
25	H9 L1	Jakob Sveinsson	Iceland	1:02.32	
26	H10 L2	Mark Warnecke	Germany	1:02.34	
27	H8 L8	Mihail Alexandrov	Bulgaria	1:02.37	
28	H9 L2	Maxim Podoprigora	Austria	1:02.38	
29	H11 L5	Darren Mew	Great Britain	1:02.43	
30	H10 L8	Thijs van Valkengoed	Netherlands	1:02.63	
31	H9 L8	Haibo Wang	China	1:02.80	
32	H8 L5	Seung Hun You	South Korea	1:02.86	
33	H9 L7	Lennart Stekelenburg	Netherlands	1:02.93	
34	H8 L3	Alwin de Prins	Luxembourg	1:03.00	
35	H11 L1	Loris Facci	Italy	1:03.11	
36	H8 L7	Daniel Málek	Czech Republic	1:03.28	
37	H7 L5	Thabang Moeketsane	South Africa	1:03.63	
38	H8 L6	Malick Fall	Senegal	1:03.70	
39	H8 L2	Mladen Tepavčević	Serbia and Montenegro	1:03.73	
40	H7 L4	Yevgeniy Ryzhkov	Kazakhstan	1:03.75	
41	H6 L3	Dzianis Silkov	Belarus	1:03.90	
42	H6 L4	Jiri Jedlicka	Czech Republic	1:03.93	
43	H7 L7	Sofiane Daid	Algeria	1:04.02	
44	H9 L3	Mihály Flaskay	Hungary	1:04.05	
45	H6 L5	Bradley Ally	Barbados	1:04.06	
46	H6 L7	Aleksander Hetland	Norway	1:04.09	
47	H8 L1	Glenn Snyders	New Zealand	1:04.14	
48	H7 L2	Aleksandr Baldin	Estonia	1:04.18	
49	H7 L8	Dean Kent	New Zealand	1:04.27	
50	H7 L1	Vorrawuti Aumpiwan	Thailand	1:04.55	
51	H7 L3	Arsenio López	Puerto Rico	1:04.67	
52	H5 L2	Andrei Capitanciuc	Moldova	1:05.42	
53	H6 L6	Tom Be'eri	Israel	1:05.44	
54	H6 L2	Puneet Rana	India	1:05.45	
55	H5 L4	Andrey Morkovin	Uzbekistan	1:05.54	
56	H5 L6	Kyriakos Dimosthenous	Cyprus	1:05.58	
57	H6 L8	Sergei Postica	Moldova	1:05.73	
58	H4 L4	Tianji Han	China	1:05.92	
59	H7 L6	Wei-Wen Wang	Chinese Taipei	1:05.95	
60	H4 L8	Keun Min Jin	South Korea	1:05.96	
61	H5 L3	Maksim Shilov	Uzbekistan	1:06.12	
62	H5 L7	Herry Yudhianto	Indonesia	1:06.24	
63	H5 L8	Mark Tan	Singapore	1:06.31	
64	H3 L1	Milan Glamocic	Bosnia and Herzegovina	1:07.06	
65	H5 L1	Alfonso Espinosa	Dominican Republic	1:07.25	
66	H3 L6	Eric Williams	Nigeria	1:07.74	
67	H3 L7	Chisela Kanchela	Zambia	1:07.80	
68	H4 L3	Leonard Tan	Singapore	1:07.81	
69	H4 L6	Mohamad Al-Naser	Kuwait	1:07.89	
70	H3 L3	Kevin Hensley	Virgin Islands	1:08.00	
71	H4 L5	Édgar Crespo	Panama	1:08.22	
72	H2 L4	Antonio Leon	Paraguay	1:08.44	
73	H4 L1	Graham Smith	Bermuda	1:08.51	
74	H3 L5	Johnny Castillo	Panama	1:08.88	
75	H4 L2	Chan Wai Ma	Macau	1:08.89	
76	H3 L8	Yousuf Alyousuf	Saudi Arabia	1:09.31	
77	H4 L7	Ivane Lekvtadze	Georgia	1:09.57	
78	H3 L2	Amar Shan	Kenya	1:09.60	
79	H2 L6	Aziz Abdul	Pakistan	1:11.08	
80	H2 L2	Joel Refos	Suriname	1:11.81	
81	H3 L4	Teymur Guliyev	Azerbaijan	1:12.24	
82	H2 L1	Sadeq Damrah	Palestine	1:15.65	
83	H1 L4	Ganbold Urnultsaikhan	Mongolia	1:16.32	
84	H1 L2	Earlando McRae	Guyana	1:16.95	
85	H1 L5	Boldbaatar Butekhuils	Mongolia	1:20.32	
86	H1 L3	Ian Taylor	Marshall Islands	1:20.80	
87	H1 L6	Michael Taylor	Marshall Islands	1:21.39	
88	H2 L8	Noah Mugenyi	Uganda	1:24.45	
-	H2 L5	Hei Meng Lao	Macau	DQ	
-	H2 L3	Remigio Chilanle	Mozambique	DNS	
-	H2 L7	Alice Shrestha	Nepal	DNS	
-	H5 L5	Francisco Picasso	Uruguay	DNS	
-	H6 L1	Ayman Khattab	Egypt	DNS	
