= Swimming at the 2007 World Aquatics Championships – Men's 50 metre breaststroke =

Men's 50 metre breaststroke at the 2007 FINA World Championships
- Venue: Rod Laver Arena
- Dates: 27 March 2007 (heats, semifinals); 28 March 2007 (final)
- Competitors: 136
- Winning time: 27.66 seconds

Medalists
gold medal	Oleg Lisogor	Ukraine
silver medal	Brendan Hansen	United States
bronze medal	Cameron van der Burgh	South Africa

The men's 50 metre breaststroke at the 2007 World Aquatics Championships took place on 27 March (heats and semifinals) and on the evening of 28 March (final) at Rod Laver Arena in Melbourne, Australia. 136 swimmers were entered in the event, of which 127 swam.

Existing records at the start of the event were:

- World record (WR): 27.18, Oleg Lisogor (Ukraine), 2 August 2002 in Berlin, Germany.
- Championship record (CR): 27.46, James Gibson (Great Britain), Barcelona 2003 (22 July 2003)

== Results ==
=== Finals ===
Place	Name	Nationality	Time	Note
1	Oleg Lisogor	Ukraine	27.66	
2	Brendan Hansen	USA	27.69	
3	Cameron van der Burgh	South Africa	27.88	
4	Alessandro Terrin	Italy	28.09	
5	Kosuke Kitajima	Japan	28.10	
6	Michael Malul	Israel	28.19	
7	Brenton Rickard	Australia	28.24	
8	Valeriy Dymo	Ukraine	28.27	

=== Semifinals ===
Rank	Swimmer	Nation	Time	Note
1	Brendan Hansen	USA	27.51	Q
2	Oleg Lisogor	Ukraine	27.53	Q
3	Alessandro Terrin	Italy	27.55	Q
4	Kosuke Kitajima	Japan	27.89	Q
5	Valeriy Dymo	Ukraine	27.97	Q
6	Brenton Rickard	Australia	27.98	Q
7	Cameron van der Burgh	South Africa	27.99	Q
8	Michael Malul	Israel	28.08	Q
9	Roman Sloudnov	Russia	28.09	
10	Robin van Aggele	Netherlands	28.10	
11	James Gibson	Great Britain	28.21	
12	Hugues Duboscq	France	28.36	
13	Mladen Tepavčević	Serbia	28.38	
14	Emil Tahirovič	Slovenia	28.40	
15	Matjaž Markič	Slovenia	28.45	
16	Wang Haibo	China	28.66	

== Heats ==
Rank	Swimmer	Nation	Time	Note
1	Cameron van der Burgh	South Africa	27.49	Q
2	Alessandro Terrin	Italy	27.53	Q
3	Brendan Hansen	USA	27.64	Q
4	Oleg Lisogor	Ukraine	27.69	Q
5	Brenton Rickard	Australia	27.80	Q
6	Michael Malul	Israel	27.92	Q
7	Kosuke Kitajima	Japan	27.97	Q
8	Valeriy Dymo	Ukraine	28.04	Q
9	James Gibson	Great Britain	28.06	Q
10	Roman Sloudnov	Russia	28.11	Q
11	Wang Haibo	China	28.12	Q
12	Matjaž Markič	Slovenia	28.15	Q
13	Hugues Duboscq	France	28.17	Q
14	Emil Tahirovič	Slovenia	28.18	Q
15	Mladen Tepavčević	Serbia	28.24	Q
16	Robin van Aggele	Netherlands	28.25	Q
17	Mark Warnecke	Germany	28.28	
18	Mihail Alexandrov	Bulgaria	28.34	
19	Jiri Jedlicka	Czech Republic	28.39	
20	Darren Mew	Great Britain	28.43	
21	Alexander Dale Oen	Norway	28.48	
22	Aleksander Hetland	Norway	28.49	
23	Johannes Neumann	Germany	28.50	
24	Felipe Lima	Brazil	28.54	
25	Henrique Barbosa	Brazil	28.58	
26	Qu Jingyu	China	28.62	
27	Glenn Snyders	New Zealand	28.64	
28	Scott Usher	USA	28.68	
29	Thabang Moeketsane	South Africa	28.78	
29	Valentin Preda	Romania	28.78	
31	Giedrius Titenis	Lithuania	28.82	
32	Malick Fall	Senegal	28.85	
33	Sławomir Wolniak	Poland	28.87	
34	Mike Brown	Canada	28.90	
35	Maxim Podoprigora	Austria	28.91	
36	Dmitry Komornikov	Russia	29.00	
37	Jakob Jóhann Sveinsson	Iceland	29.02	
38	Makoto Yamashita	Japan	29.06	
39	Andrei Cross	Barbados	29.08	
40	Damien Courtois	Switzerland	29.28	
41	Mohammad Alirezaei	Iran	29.31	
42	Edvinas Dautartas	Lithuania	29.32	
43	Nikola Delic	Croatia	29.36	
44	Martin Liivamägi	Estonia	29.38	
44	Wael Koubrously	Lebanon	29.38	
46	Alwin de Prins	Luxembourg	29.44	
47	Edgar Robert Crespo	Panama	29.51	
48	Miguel Molina	Philippines	29.56	
49	Sergiu Postica	Moldova	29.59	
50	Mikalai Vasilyeu	Belarus	29.67	
51	Andrei Capitanciuc	Moldova	29.68	
52	Hsin Hung Chiang	Chinese Taipei	29.69	
53	Rainui Terupaia	Tahiti	29.74	
54	Martti Aljand	Estonia	29.76	
55	Vidvuds Maculevics	Latvia	29.83	
56	Adam Lucas	Australia	29.84	
57	Tom Be'eri	Israel	29.92	
58	Yevgeniy Ryzhkov	Kazakhstan	30.02	
59	Kirils Sanzarovecs	Latvia	30.04	
60	Wei-Xiong Parker Lam	Singapore	30.14	
61	Josh Laban	(United States Virgin Islands) Virgin Islands	30.21	
62	Kevin Hensley	(United States Virgin Islands) Virgin Islands	30.22	
63	Billy Arfianto	Indonesia	30.27	
64	Milan Glamocic	Bosnia and Herzegovina	30.32	
65	Sujong Sin	South Korea	30.35	
65	Francisco Picasso Risso	Uruguay	30.35	
67	Herry Yudhianto	Indonesia	30.47	
68	Jin Leonard Tan	Singapore	30.55	
69	Eric Williams	Nigeria	30.56	
70	Wei Wen Wang	Chinese Taipei	30.59	
71	Gerard Bordado	Philippines	30.71	
71	Antonio Manuel Leon Candia	Paraguay	30.71	
73	Genaro Mathias Prono Britez	Paraguay	30.91	
74	Amar Shah	Kenya	31.08	
75	See Tuan Yap	Malaysia	31.19	
76	Chisela Kanchela	Zambia	31.25	
77	Rodion Davelaar	Netherlands Antilles	31.46	
78	Youssef Hafdi	Morocco	31.60	
79	Onan Thom	Guyana	31.69	
80	Eric Arturo Medina Su	Panama	31.92	
81	Erik Rajohnson	Madagascar	31.96	
82	Butekhuils Boldbaatar	Mongolia	32.00	
83	Celestino Aguon	Guam	32.11	
84	Alexander Rivero	Bolivia	32.16	
85	Joao Matias	Angola	32.25	
86	Omar Jasim	Brunei	32.33	
87	Jehad Al Henidi	Jordan	32.40	
88	Khaly Ciss	Senegal	32.43	
89	Jamie Zammitt	Gibraltar	32.59	
90	Melvin Chua	Malaysia	32.50	
91	Hong Nam Lei	Macao	32.66	
92	Chakyl Camal	Mozambique	32.74	
93	Heimanu Sichan	Tahiti	32.78	
94	Hei Meng Lao	Macao	32.79	
95	Guvanch Ataniyazov	Turkmenistan	33.03	
96	Kevin Cheung	Mauritius	33.26	
97	Neil Agius	Malta	33.34	
98	Aram Nazaryan	Armenia	33.44	
99	Varun Divgikar	India	33.73	
100	Sadeq Damrah	Palestine	33.86	
101	Eli Ebenezer Wong	Northern Mariana Islands	33.89	
102	Tony Augustine	Federated States of Micronesia	33.96	
103	Monder Al-Jabali	Libya	34.01	
104	Timur Kartabaev	Kyrgyzstan	34.16	
105	Julio Smith	Seychelles	34.18	
106	Hassan Ashraf	Maldives	34.67	
107	Joshua Marfleet	Samoa	34.88	
108	A. Aldhaheri	United Arab Emirates	35.00	
109	Justine Rodriguez	Federated States of Micronesia	36.10	
110	Niall Roberts	Guyana	36.31.	
111	Stephenson Wallace	(Saint Vincent and the Grenadines) Saint Vincent and the Grenadines	37.02	
112	Justin Decoster	Marshall Islands	37.43	
113	Petero Okotai	Cook Islands	37.86	
114	Rahim Karmali	Uganda	38.00	
115	Aymard Lumuamu-Dimbu	Congo	38.16	
116	M. Alhousseini Alhassan	Niger	38.50	
117	Bulguitei Buyankhishig	Mongolia	38.91	
118	Vincent Leatualevao	American Samoa	39.46	
119	Iglay Dangassat-Sissoulou	Congo	39.47	
120	Ahmed Adam	Sudan	40.81	
121	Boipelo Makhothi	Lesotho	41.91	
122	Lehlohonolo Moromella	Lesotho	42.93	
123	Robert Scanlan	American Samoa	43.24	
124	Giordan Harris	Marshall Islands	47.28	
125	Gibrilla Bamba	Sierra Leone	55.11	
--	Anthony Kpetonky	Ghana	DQ	
--	Moustafa Al-Saleh	Syria	DQ	
--	Rene Jacob Yougbare	Burkina Faso	DNS	
--	Salfo Ilbouda	Burkina Faso	DNS	
--	Akibou Yacouba Ali Maiga	Niger	DNS	
--	Yacoub Salem Bilal	Mauritania	DNS	
--	Essossimana Awizoba	Togo	DNS	
--	Joao Aguiar	Angola	DNS	
--	Shajahan Ali Rony	Bangladesh	DNS	
--	Osama Al Araj	Qatar	DNS	
--	Vanja Rogulj	Croatia	DNS	

== See also ==
- Swimming at the 2005 World Aquatics Championships – Men's 50 metre breaststroke
- Swimming at the 2009 World Aquatics Championships – Men's 50 metre breaststroke
