= Swimming at the 2007 World Aquatics Championships – Men's 200 metre breaststroke =

Men's 200 metre breaststroke at the 2007 FINA World Championships
- Venue: Rod Laver Arena
- Dates: 29 March 2007(heats, semifinals); 30 March 2007 (final)
- Competitors: 85
- Winning time: 2:09.80

Medalists
gold medal	Kosuke Kitajima	Japan
silver medal	Brenton Rickard	Australia
bronze medal	Loris Facci	Italy

The men's 200 metre breaststroke at the 2007 World Aquatics Championships took place on 29 March (heats and semifinals) and on the evening of 30 March (final) at Rod Laver Arena in Melbourne, Australia. 85 swimmers were entered in the event, of which 79 swam.

Existing records at the start of the event were:

- World record (WR): 2:08.50, Brendan Hansen (USA), 20 August 2006 in Victoria, Canada.
- Championship record (CR): 2:09.42, Kosuke Kitajima (Japan), Barcelona 2003 (24 July 2003)

== Results ==
=== Finals ===
Place	Name	Nationality	Time	Note
1	Kosuke Kitajima	Japan	2:09.80	
2	Brenton Rickard	Australia	2:10.99	
3	Loris Facci	Italy	2:11.03	
4	Paolo Bossini	Italy	2:11.38	
5	Eric Shanteau	United States	2:11.50	
6	Dániel Gyurta	Hungary	2:11.62	
7	Mike Brown	Canada	2:12.01	
8	Grigory Falko	Russia	2:12.16	

=== Semifinals ===
Rank	Swimmer	Nation	Time	Note
1	Kosuke Kitajima	Japan	2:10.30	Q
2	Brenton Rickard	Australia	2:11.41	Q
2	Paolo Bossini	Italy	2:11.41	Q
4	Loris Facci	Italy	2:11.48	Q
5	Eric Shanteau	USA	2:11.54	Q
6	Mike Brown	Canada	2:11.61	Q
7	Dániel Gyurta	Hungary	2:12.31	Q
8	Grigory Falko	Russia	2:12.44	Q
9	Valeriy Dymo	Ukraine	2:12.78	
10	Jim Piper	Australia	2:13.40	
11	Kris Gilchrist	Great Britain	2:13.44	
12	Alexander Ovchinnikov	Russia	2:13.45	
13	Igor Borysik	Ukraine	2:14.00	
14	Lai Zhongjian	China	2:14.44	
15	Alexander Dale Oen	Norway	2:14.63	
16	Daisuke Kimura	Japan	DQ	

=== Heats ===
Rank	Swimmer	Nation	Time	Note
1	Kosuke Kitajima	Japan	2:11.07	Q
2	Loris Facci	Italy	2:12.07	Q
3	Paolo Bossini	Italy	2:12.20	Q
4	Mike Brown	Canada	2:12.39	Q
5	Dániel Gyurta	Hungary	2:12.61	Q
6	Jim Piper	Australia	2:12.94	Q
7	Eric Shanteau	USA	2:13.00	Q
8	Grigory Falko	Russia	2:13.10	Q
8	Igor Borysik	Ukraine	2:13.10	Q
10	Valeriy Dymo	Ukraine	2:13.11	Q
11	Brenton Rickard	Australia	2:13.16	Q
12	Kris Gilchrist	Great Britain	2:13.36	Q
13	Alexander Ovchinnikov	Russia	2:13.67	Q
14	Daisuke Kimura	Japan	2:13.86	Q
15	Alexander Dale Oen	Norway	2:14.00	Q
16	LAI Zhongjian	China	2:14.03	Q
17	Sławomir Wolniak	Poland	2:14.20	
18	Robin van Aggele	Netherlands	2:14.66	
19	Mihail Alexandrov	Bulgaria	2:14.74	
20	Chris Christensen	Denmark	2:14.76	
21	Sławomir Kuczko	Poland	2:14.80	
22	James Kirton	Great Britain	2:14.93	
23	Cameron van der Burgh	South Africa	2:15.10	
24	Romanos Alyfantis	Greece	2:15.11	
25	Jiri Jedlicka	Czech Republic	2:15.19	
26	Sofiane Daid	Algeria	2:15.54	
27	Maxim Podoprigora	Austria	2:15.80	
28	Shin Su-jong	South Korea	2:15.88	
29	Richárd Bodor	Hungary	2:15.89	
30	Yevgeniy Ryzhkov	Kazakhstan	2:16.18	
31	Tom Beeri	Israel	2:16.32	
32	Giedrius Titenis	Lithuania	2:16.50	
33	Henrique Barbosa	Brazil	2:16.89	
34	Valentin Preda	Romania	2:16.97	
35	Johannes Neumann	Germany	2:17.72	
36	Edvinas Dautartas	Lithuania	2:17.74	
37	Vasileios Demetis	Greece	2:18.28	
38	Glenn Snyders	New Zealand	2:18.72	
39	Dimitri Waeber	Switzerland	2:20.02	
40	Wei Wen Wang	Chinese Taipei	2:20.54	
41	ZHAO Tao	China	2:21.64	
42	Malick Fall	Senegal	2:21.74	
43	Billy Arfianto	Indonesia	2:21.82	
44	Andrey Morkovin	Uzbekistan	2:22.58	
45	Hsin Hung Chiang	Chinese Taipei	2:22.59	
46	Jin Leonard Tan	Singapore	2:23.33	
47	Diego Bonilla	Colombia	2:23.50	
48	Vidvuds Maculevics	Latvia	2:23.53	
49	Herry Yudhianto	Indonesia	2:24.47	
50	Kevin Hensley	(United States Virgin Islands) Virgin Islands	2:25.63	
51	Jin Wen Mark Tan	Singapore	2:26.54	
52	Wael Kobrosly	Lebanon	2:26.62	
53	Sobitjon Amilov	Uzbekistan	2:27.56	
54	Gerard Bordado	Philippines	2:28.72	
55	See Tuan Yap	Malaysia	2:30.02	
56	Hei Meng Lao	Macao	2:30.07	
57	Moustafa Al-Saleh	Syria	2:30.81	
58	Rainui Terupaia	Tahiti	2:31.47	
59	Kirils Sanzarovecs	Latvia	2:32.18	
60	Mohammad Alirezaei	Iran	2:33.11	
61	Genaro Mathias Prono Britez	Paraguay	2:34.44	
62	Celestino Aguon	Guam	2:34.84	
62	Eli Ebenezer Wong	Northern Mariana Islands	2:34.84	
64	Melvin Chua	Malaysia	2:35.06	
65	Gavin Santos	Gibraltar	2:38.17	
66	Guvanch Ataniyazov	Turkmenistan	2:38.24	
67	Eric Williams	Nigeria	2:38.67	
68	Alexander Rivero	Bolivia	2:39.54	
69	Eric Arturo Medina Su	Panama	2:41.90	
69	Hong Nam Lei	Macao	2:41.90	
71	Jehad Al Henidi	Jordan	2:42.12	
72	Timur Kartabaev	Kyrgyzstan	2:42.94	
73	A. Aldhaheri	United Arab Emirates	2:44.66	
74	Kevin Cheung	Mauritius	2:47.26	
75	Sadeq Damrah	Palestine	2:50.15	
76	Anthony Kpetonky	Ghana	3:27.80	
--	Jakob Jóhann Sveinsson	Iceland	DQ	
--	Miguel Molina	Philippines	DQ	
--	Moro Abdul Fatawu	Ghana	DQ	
--	Brendan Hansen	USA	DNS	
--	Vanja Rogulj	Croatia	DNS	
--	Dean Kent	New Zealand	DNS	
--	Alwin de Prins	Luxembourg	DNS	
--	Chisela Kanchela	Zambia	DNS	
--	Amar Shah	Kenya	DNS	

== See also ==
- Swimming at the 2005 World Aquatics Championships – Men's 200 metre breaststroke
- Swimming at the 2008 Summer Olympics – Men's 200 metre breaststroke
- Swimming at the 2009 World Aquatics Championships – Men's 200 metre breaststroke
