= Swimming at the 2003 World Aquatics Championships – Men's 200 metre breaststroke =

Men's 200m Breaststroke at the 2003 FINA World Aquatics Championships
- Dates: 23 July (prelims & semifinals); 24 July (final)
- Winning time: 2 minutes 9.42 seconds

Medalists
gold medal	Kosuke Kitajima	Japan
silver medal	Ian Edmond	Great Britain
bronze medal	Brendan Hansen	United States

The Men's 200 Breaststroke event at the 10th FINA World Aquatics Championships swam July 23–24, 2003 in Barcelona, Spain. Preliminary and Semifinal heats swam on 23 July, while the Final swam on 24 July.

At the start of the event, the existing World (WR) and Championship (CR) records were:

- WR: 2:09.52 swum by Dmitri Komornikov (Russia) on June 14, 2003 in Barcelona, Spain
- CR: 2:10.69 swum by Brendan Hansen (USA) on July 26, 2001 in Fukuoka, Japan

== Results ==
=== Final ===
Place	Swimmer	Nation	Time	Notes
1	Kosuke Kitajima	Japan	2:09.42	WR
2	Ian Edmond	Great Britain	2:10.92	
3	Brendan Hansen	USA	2:11.11	
4	Jim Piper	Australia	2:11.55	
5	Dmitry Komornikov	Russia	2:12.30	
6	Andrey Ivanov	Russia	2:13.20	
7	Mike Brown	Canada	2:13.30	
8	Maxim Podoprigora	Austria	2:13.33	

=== Semifinals ===
Rank	Heat + Lane	Swimmer	Nation	Time	Notes
1	S2 L4	Kosuke Kitajima	Japan	2:09.73	q, CR
2	S1 L4	Ian Edmond	Great Britain	2:10.69	q
3	S1 L6	Brendan Hansen	USA	2:11.33	q
4	S2 L6	Jim Piper	Australia	2:11.88	q
5	S2 L5	Dmitry Komornikov	Russia	2:12.74	q
6	S2 L3	Andrey Ivanov	Russia	2:12.86	q
7	S1 L1	Maxim Podoprigora	Austria	2:13.17	q
8	S1 L5	Mike Brown	Canada	2:13.19	q
9	S2 L7	Morgan Knabe	Canada	2:13.23	
10	S2 L8	Martin Gustavsson	Sweden	2:13.88	
11	S1 L2	Yohan Bernard	France	2:14.23	
12	S2 L1	Davide Rummolo	Italy	2:14.36	
13	S1 L7	Domenico Fioravanti	Italy	2:14.60	
14	S1 L3	Dániel Gyurta	Hungary	2:14.84	
15	S2 L2	Terence Parkin	South Africa	2:14.96	
16	S1 L8	Jakob Sveinsson	Iceland	2:15.27	

=== Preliminaries ===
Rank	Heat+Lane	Swimmer	Nation	Time	Notes
1	H8 L4	Kosuke Kitajima	Japan	2:10.66	q, CR
2	H9 L5	Ian Edmond	Great Britain	2:12.07	q
3	H9 L4	Dmitry Komornikov	Russia	2:13.35	q
4	H9 L6	Mike Brown	Canada	2:13.38	q
5	H7 L2	Andrey Ivanov	Russia	2:13.45	q
6	H8 L1	Dániel Gyurta	Hungary	2:13.63	q
7	H9 L3	Jim Piper	Australia	2:13.65	q
8	H7 L5	Brendan Hansen	United States	2:13.92	q
9	H9 L2	Terence Parkin	South Africa	2:14.14	q
10	H8 L5	Yohan Bernard	France	2:14.53	q
11	H7 L3	Morgan Knabe	Canada	2:14.72	q
12	H8 L8	Domenico Fioravanti	Italy	2:14.78	q
13	H7 L4	Davide Rummolo	Italy	2:14.79	q
13	H8 L6	Maxim Podoprigora	Austria	2:14.79	q
15	H9 L8	Martin Gustavsson	Sweden	2:14.96	q
16	H6 L4	Jakob Sveinsson	Iceland	2:15.20	q
17	H9 L1	Andrew Bree	Ireland	2:15.23	
18	H8 L7	Taiki Kawagoe	Japan	2:15.24	
19	H7 L1	Richárd Bodor	Hungary	2:15.74	
20	H8 L3	Regan Harrison	Australia	2:15.77	
21	H7 L7	Hugues Duboscq	France	2:15.89	
22	H6 L5	Reiner Schneider	Germany	2:16.01	
23	H9 L7	Jarno Pihlava	Finland	2:16.05	
24	H7 L8	Kamil Kasprowicz	Germany	2:16.43	
25	H6 L1	Thiago Pereira	Brazil	2:16.44	
26	H6 L2	Daniel Málek	Czech Republic	2:16.86	
27	H6 L6	Marcelo Tomazini	Brazil	2:16.88	
28	H6 L3	Vlad Polyakov	Kazakhstan	2:17.18	
29	H5 L4	Dov Malnik	Israel	2:17.84	
30	H4 L4	Christopher Hansen	Norway	2:18.42	
31	H4 L5	Mihail Alexandrov	Bulgaria	2:19.29	
32	H5 L2	Vladimir Kirjanovs	Latvia	2:21.49	
33	H3 L5	Wickus Nienaber	Swaziland	2:21.75	
34	H5 L6	Tao Zhao	China	2:22.26	
35	H4 L3	Lorenz Liechti	Switzerland	2:22.40	
36	H4 L2	Hocine Haciane	Andorra	2:22.51	
37	H4 L1	Chi Kin Tam	Hong Kong	2:22.94	
38	H3 L4	Raphael Matthew Chua	Philippines	2:24.25	
39	H5 L8	Francisco Suriano	El Salvador	2:24.51	
40	H5 L7	Maksim Shilov	Uzbekistan	2:24.67	
41	H4 L8	Sergey Voytsekhovich	Uzbekistan	2:25.15	
42	H4 L7	Álvaro Fortuny	Guatemala	2:26.14	
43	H3 L3	Kevin Hensley	Virgin Islands	2:30.93	
44	H2 L2	Youssef Hafdi	Morocco	2:31.44	
44	H3 L6	Marcos Burgos	Chile	2:31.44	
46	H2 L6	Hei Meng Lao	Macau	2:31.90	
47	H3 L7	Santiago Cavanagh	Bolivia	2:32.56	
48	H2 L4	Grant Galant	South Africa	2:34.05	
49	H2 L5	Nam Nguyen Thanh	Vietnam	2:34.10	
50	H3 L8	Baktash Gheidi	Iran	2:38.07	
51	H2 L8	Chisela Kanchela	Zambia	2:38.38	
52	H2 L1	Joao Matias	Angola	2:39.21	
53	H3 L1	Daniel Kang	Guam	2:41.51	
54	H1 L5	Amar Shah	Kenya	2:41.97	
55	H2 L3	Chan Wai Ma	Macau	2:43.35	
56	H2 L7	Iyad Houseya	Palestine	2:55.75	
-	H1 L3	Omar Jasim	Bahrain	DQ	
-	H4 L6	Miguel Molina	Philippines	DQ	
-	H5 L5	Malick Fall	Senegal	DQ	
-	H5 L3	Haibo Wang	China	DQ	
-	H5 L1	Vladimir Labzin	Estonia	DQ	
-	H6 L7	Sofiane Daid	Algeria	DQ	
-	H6 L8	Valeriy Dymo	Ukraine	DQ	
-	H7 L6	Dave Denniston	United States	DQ	
-	H8 L2	Thijs van Valkengoed	Netherlands	DQ	
-	-	Jean-Luc Razakarivony	Madagascar	DNS	
-	-	Ahmed Ouattara Zie	Ivory Coast	DNS	
