= Swimming at the 2005 World Aquatics Championships – Men's 200 metre breaststroke =

Men's 200m Breaststroke at the 2005 FINA World Aquatics Championships
- Dates: 28 July (preliminaries and semifinals), 29 July (final)
- Competitors: 65 from 44 nations
- Winning time: 2 minutes 09.85 seconds

Medalists
gold medal	Brendan Hansen	United States
silver medal	Mike Brown	Canada
bronze medal	Genki Imamura	Japan

The Men's 200 Breaststroke event at the XI FINA World Aquatics Championships swam on 28 and 29 July 2005 in Montreal, Quebec, Canada. Preliminary (morning) and semifinal (evening) heats swam 28 July; the final on 29 July.

Prior to the competition, the existing World (WR) and Championship (CR) records were:

- WR: 2:09.04 swum by Brendan Hansen (USA) on 11 July 2004 in Long Beach, USA;
- CR: 2:09.42 swum by Kosuke Kitajima (Japan) on 24 July 2003 in Barcelona, Spain.

== Results ==
=== Final ===
Place	Swimmer	Nation	Time	Notes
1	Brendan Hansen	USA	2:09.85	
2	Mike Brown	Canada	2:11.22	
3	Genki Imamura	Japan	2:11.54	
4	Jim Piper	Australia	2:12.42	
5	Sławomir Kuczko	Poland	2:12.44	
6	Grigory Falko	Russia	2:12.51	
7	Loris Facci	Italy	2:12.62	
8	Vlad Polyakov	Kazakhstan	2:12.72	

=== Semifinals ===
Rank	Heat+Lane	Swimmer	Nation	Time	Notes
1	S1 L4	Brendan Hansen	USA	2:10.23	q
2	S1 L5	Mike Brown	Canada	2:11.26	q
3	S1 L3	Genki Imamura	Japan	2:11.77	q
4	S1 L6	Jim Piper	Australia	2:12.17	q
5	S2 L3	Grigory Falko	Russia	2:12.20	q
6	S2 L5	Sławomir Kuczko	Poland	2:12.34	q
7	S2 L6	Loris Facci	Italy	2:12.43	q
8	S2 L4	Vlad Polyakov	Kazakhstan	2:12.50	q
9	S2 L2	Scott Usher	USA	2:13.03	
10	S1 L1	Dmitry Komornikov	Russia	2:13.56	
11	S2 L7	Daisuke Kimura	Japan	2:14.00	
12	S1 L8	Valeriy Dymo	Ukraine	2:14.02	
13	S1 L7	Brenton Rickard	Australia	2:14.68	
14	S1 L2	Igor Borysik	Ukraine	2:14.94	
15	S2 L1	Jakob Sveinsson	Iceland	2:15.61	
16	S2 L8	Yevgeniy Ryzhkov	Kazakhstan	2:15.80	

=== Preliminaries ===
Rank	Heat+Lane	Swimmer	Nation	Time	Notes
1	H7 L5	Vlad Polyakov	Kazakhstan	2:12.73	q
2	H7 L4	Brendan Hansen	United States	2:12.74	q
3	H7 L3	Sławomir Kuczko	Poland	2:12.76	q
4	H5 L3	Mike Brown	Canada	2:12.96	q
5	H6 L3	Grigory Falko	Russia	2:13.35	q
6	H5 L4	Genki Imamura	Japan	2:13.36	q
7	H5 L6	Loris Facci	Italy	2:13.46	q
8	H6 L4	Jim Piper	Australia	2:13.47	q
9	H5 L5	Scott Usher	United States	2:13.89	q
10	H6 L7	Igor Borysik	Ukraine	2:14.74	q
11	H7 L2	Daisuke Kimura	Japan	2:15.20	q
12	H7 L6	Brenton Rickard	Australia	2:15.26	q
13	H7 L1	Jakob Sveinsson	Iceland	2:15.28	q
14	H6 L5	Dmitry Komornikov	Russia	2:15.35	q
15	H5 L7	Yevgeniy Ryzhkov	Kazakhstan	2:15.65	q
16	H7 L7	Valeriy Dymo	Ukraine	2:15.94	q
17	H4 L4	Mihail Alexandrov	Bulgaria	2:16.08	
18	H6 L2	Maxim Podoprigora	Austria	2:16.33	
19	H3 L7	Alexander Dale Oen	Norway	2:16.38	
20	H6 L6	Richárd Bodor	Hungary	2:16.82	
21	H4 L5	Aleksander Baldin	Estonia	2:16.83	
22	H6 L8	Tom Be'eri	Israel	2:16.89	
23	H5 L1	Scott Dickens	Canada	2:17.28	
24	H6 L1	Jiri Jedlicka	Czech Republic	2:17.67	
25	H3 L4	You Seung-Hun	South Korea	2:17.89	
26	H4 L1	Miguel Molina	Philippines	2:18.71	
26	H5 L2	Martin Gustavsson	Sweden	2:18.71	
28	H3 L1	Alwin de Prins	Luxembourg	2:19.11	
29	H4 L7	Bradley Ally	Barbados	2:19.12	
30	H5 L8	Wei-Wen Wang	Chinese Taipei	2:19.13	
31	H4 L8	Shin Su-Jong	South Korea	2:20.02	
32	H3 L3	Thabang Moeketsane	South Africa	2:20.38	
33	H7 L8	Sofiane Daid	Algeria	2:20.69	
34	H3 L2	Glenn Snyders	New Zealand	2:21.33	
34	H4 L3	Andrey Morkovin	Uzbekistan	2:21.33	
36	H4 L6	Hocine Haciane	Andorra	2:21.98	
37	H3 L5	Vorrawuti Aumpiwan	Thailand	2:23.26	
38	H2 L5	Mark Tan	Singapore	2:23.85	
39	H2 L6	M. Akbar Nasution	Indonesia	2:24.07	
40	H3 L8	Puneet Rana	India	2:25.32	
41	H2 L4	Herry Yudhianto	Indonesia	2:25.67	
42	H2 L3	Leonard Tan	Singapore	2:28.71	
43	H2 L7	Johnny Castillo	Panama	2:29.42	
44	H3 L6	Maksim Shilov	Uzbekistan	2:29.57	
45	H2 L1	Kevin Hensley	Virgin Islands	2:30.19	
46	H1 L4	Hei Meng Lao	Macau	2:30.43	
47	H1 L6	Yousuf Alyousuf	Saudi Arabia	2:30.61	
48	H1 L8	Youssef Hafdi	Morocco	2:30.85	
49	H2 L2	Alfonso Espinosa	Dominican Republic	2:31.82	
50	H2 L8	Graham Smith	Bermuda	2:32.14	
51	H1 L3	Ivane Lekvtadze	Georgia	2:32.47	
52	H1 L5	Chan Wai Ma	Macau	2:32.73	
53	H1 L7	Amar Shah	Kenya	2:37.61	
54	H1 L2	Chisela Kanchela	Zambia	2:38.69	
-	H1 L1	Aziz Abdul	Pakistan	DQ	
-	H4 L2	Ayman Khattab	Egypt	DNS	
