= Swimming at the 2005 World Aquatics Championships – Men's 4 × 100 metre medley relay =

Men's 4×100m Medley Relay at the 2005 FINA World Aquatics Championships
- Dates: July 31, 2005
- Nations: 23
- Winning time: 3:31.85

Medalists
gold medal	United States
silver medal	Russia
bronze medal	Japan

The Men's 4x100 Medley Relay event at the 11th FINA World Aquatics Championships was swum on July 31, 2005 in Montreal, Quebec, Canada. 21 national teams swam in the Preliminary heats of the event in the morning; with the top-8 fastest teams advancing to swim again in the Final that evening.

At the start of the event, the existing World (WR) and Championships (CR) records were:

- WR: 3:30.68, (United States) USA, swum August 21, 2004 in Athens, Greece
- CR: 3:31.54, (United States) USA, swum July 27, 2003 in Barcelona, Spain

== Results ==
=== Final ===
Place	Lane	Nation	Swimmers (split)	Time	Notes
1	4	USA	Aaron Peirsol (54.26), Brendan Hansen (59.33), Ian Crocker (50.39), Jason Lezak (47.87)	3:31.85	
2	3	Russia	Arkady Vyatchanin (54.75), Dmitry Komornikov (59.64), Igor Marchenko (52.16), Andrey Kapralov (48.53)	3:35.08	
3	5	Japan	Tomomi Morita (54.85), Kosuke Kitajima (59.19), Ryo Takayasu (52.48), Daisuke Hosokawa (48.88)	3:35.40	
4	7	Germany	Steffen Driesen (55.05), Jens Kruppa (1:01.26), Thomas Rupprath (51.82), Marco di Carli (49.19)	3:37.32	
5	1	France	Simon Dufour (55.91), Hugues Duboscq (59.58), Romain Barnier (53.13), Frédérick Bousquet (48.98)	3:37.60	
6	6	Australia	Andrew Lauterstein (55.63), Brenton Rickard (1:00.20), Andrew Richards (53.51), Michael Klim (48.28)	3:37.62	
-	8	New Zealand	Scott Talbot (56.12), Glenn Snyders (1:03.26), Moss Burmester (-), Cameron Gibson (-)	disqualified	
-	2	Slovenia	Blaž Medvešek (55.80), Emil Tahirovič (-), Peter Mankoč (-), Jernej Godec (-)	disqualified	

=== Preliminaries ===
Rank	Heat+Lane	Nation	Swimmers (split)	Time	Notes
1	H3 L4	United States	Randall Bal (54.16), Mark Gangloff (1:01.10), Michael Phelps (52.27), Neil Walker (48.55)	3:36.08	q
2	H1 L4	Japan	Tomomi Morita (55.17), Kosuke Kitajima (59.80), Ryo Takayasu (53.10), Hisayoshi Sato (49.30)	3:37.37	q
3	H3 L5	Russia	Arkady Vyatchanin (55.16), Grigory Falko (1:01.61), Evgeny Korotyshkin (52.85), Evgeny Lagunov (48.21)	3:37.83	q
4	H3 L3	Australia	Andrew Lauterstein (55.01), Brenton Rickard (1:00.52), Andrew Richards (53.27), Andrew Mewing (49.43)	3:38.23	q
5	H1 L3	Slovenia	Blaž Medvešek (55.36), Emil Tahirovič (1:00.94), Peter Mankoč (52.52), Jernej Godec (49.58)	3:38.40	q
6	H2 L4	Germany	Steffen Driesen (55.03), Jens Kruppa (1:01.67), Thomas Rupprath (52.56), Stefan Herbst (49.27)	3:38.53	q
7	H2 L5	France	Simon Dufour (56.48), Hugues Duboscq (59.95), Romain Barnier (53.71), Frédérick Bousquet (48.71)	3:38.85	q
8	H3 L6	New Zealand	Scott Talbot (56.10), Glenn Snyders (1:03.09), Moss Burmester (52.94), Cameron Gibson (49.23)	3:41.36	q
9	H2 L3	Canada	Keith Beavers (58.13), Mike Brown (1:01.43), Mike Mintenko (53.12), Brent Hayden (49.17)	3:41.85	
10	H3 L8	Poland	Tomasz Rumianowski (56.96), Sławomir Kuczko (1:02.12), Paweł Korzeniowski (53.71), Lukasz Gasior (49.40)	3:42.19	
11	H1 L6	South Korea	Seung-Hyeon Lee (58.43), Seung Hun You (1:01.96), Jeong Nam Yu (54.43), Ki Hyuk Sim (51.71)	3:46.53	
12	H3 L2	Lithuania	Pavel Suskov (57.08), Vytautas Janušaitis (1:04.61), Paulius Viktoravicius (54.42), Rolandas Gimbutis (50.63)	3:46.74	
13	H3 L1	Israel	Yoav Gath (57.32), Tom Be'eri (1:04.59), Erez Feren (55.09), Shai Livnat (51.20)	3:48.20	
14	H1 L7	Barbados	Nick Neckles (56.33), Bradley Ally (1:04.08), Shawn Clarke (56.65), Terrence Haynes (52.55)	3:49.61	
15	H1 L2	Uzbekistan	Sergey Pankov (1:00.74), Andrey Morkovin (1:05.52), Oleg Lyashko (56.63), Timur Irgashev (53.17)	3:56.06	
16	H2 L2	Singapore	Gary Tan (1:00.14), Mark Tan (1:06.77), Cheng Xun Ng (56.87), Mark Chay (52.43)	3:56.21	
17	H2 L8	Virgin Islands	Kieran Locke (1:00.46), Kevin Hensley (1:07.39), Scott Hensley (58.63), Josh Laban (53.46)	3:59.94	
18	H3 L7	Kenya	David Dunford (1:01.85), Amar Shah (1:09.44), Rama Vyombo (1:00.29), Jason Dunford (52.51)	4:04.09	
19	H2 L1	Macau	Chi Lon Lei (1:02.91), Chan Wai Ma (1:07.92), Wing Cheun Wong (56.19), Hei Meng Lao (59.43)	4:06.45	
20	H2 L7	Senegal	Khlay Ciss (1:02.09), Malick Fall (1:04.08), Madicke Mbengue (1:02.70), Pape Madiop Ndong (58.55)	4:07.42	
-	H1 L5	Ukraine	Pavlo Illichov (57.14), Oleg Lisogor (59.65), Denys Sylantyev (53.18), Yuri Yegoshin (-)	disqualified	
-	H1 L1	Mongolia	not applicable	DNS	
-	H2 L6	Italy	not applicable	DNS	
