= Swimming at the 2001 World Aquatics Championships – Men's 200 metre breaststroke =

Men's 200 metre breaststroke at the 2001 FINA World Championships
- Dates: 25 July 2001 (heats, semifinals); 26 July 2001 (final)
- Competitors: 40
- Winning time: 2 minutes 10.69 seconds

Medalists
gold medal	Brendan Hansen	United States
silver medal	Maxim Podoprigora	Austria
bronze medal	Kosuke Kitajima	Japan

The men's 200 metre breaststroke event at the 2001 World Aquatics Championships took place 26 July. The heats and semifinals took place on 25 July, with the final being held on 26 July.

== Records ==
Prior to the competition, the existing world and championship records were as follows:

World record	Mike Barrowman (USA)	2:10.16	Barcelona, Spain	29 July 1992
Championship record	Mike Barrowman (USA)	2:11.23	Perth, Australia	11 January 1991

The following record was established during the competition:

Date	Round	Name	Nation	Time	Record
26 July 2001	Final	Brendan Hansen	United States	2:10.69	CR

== Results ==
=== Heats ===
Rank	Name	Nationality	Time	Notes
1	Maxim Podoprigora	Austria	2:12.26	Q
2	Brendan Hansen	United States	2:13.35	Q
3	Regan Harrison	Australia	2:13.50	Q
4	Kosuke Kitajima	Japan	2:13.56	Q
5	Ed Moses	United States	2:13.58	Q
6	Dmitri Komornikov	Russia	2:13.73	Q
7	Davide Rummolo	Italy	2:14.33	Q
8	Martin Gustafsson	Sweden	2:14.72	Q
9	Domenico Fioravanti	Italy	2:15.09	Q
10	Morgan Knabe	Canada	2:15.62	Q
11	Daniel Málek	Czech Republic	2:15.64	Q
12	Ian Edmond	United Kingdom	2:15.84	Q
13	José Couto	Portugal	2:15.95	Q
14	Hugues Duboscq	France	2:16.51	Q
15	Yoshiaki Okita	Japan	2:16.80	Q
16	Jakob Jóhann Sveinsson	Iceland	2:17.09	Q
17	Simon Cowley	Australia	2:17.35	
18	Elvin Chia	Malaysia	2:17.91	
19	Vladimir Labzin	Estonia	2:18.73	
20	Jarno Pihlava	Finland	2:18.90	
21	Valērijs Kalmikovs	Latvia	2:19.23	
22	Tam Chi Kin	Hong Kong	2:19.78	
23	Michael Williamson	Ireland	2:20.09	
24	Dov Malnik	Israel	2:20.52	
25	Wickus Nienaber	Eswatini	2:21.85	
26	Yang Shang-Hsuan	Chinese Taipei	2:22.42	
27	Chen Cho-Yi	Chinese Taipei	2:22.51	
28	Álvaro Fortuny	Guatemala	2:22.94	
29	Sergey Voytsekhovich	Uzbekistan	2:23.71	
30	Ansel Tjin A Tam	Suriname	2:24.76	
31	Malick Fall	Senegal	2:26.70	
32	Guillermo Henriquez	Dominican Republic	2:27.29	
33	Jean Luc Razakarivony	Madagascar	2:27.52	
34	Graham Smith	Bermuda	2:28.72	
35	Baktash Gheidi	Iran	2:31.01	
36	Abdul Hafiz Salleh	Malaysia	2:33.60	
37	Rainui Teriipaia	Tahiti	2:34.76	
38	Chan Wai Ma	Macau	2:36.06	
39	Oday Mohammad	Iraq	2:54.23	
40	Iyad Housheya	Palestine	2:54.65	
–	Juan José Madrigal	Costa Rica	DNS	

=== Semifinals ===
Rank	Name	Nationality	Time	Notes
1	Maxim Podoprigora	Austria	2:11.65	Q
2	Kosuke Kitajima	Japan	2:12.21	Q
3	Regan Harrison	Australia	2:12.34	Q
4	Domenico Fioravanti	Italy	2:12.70	Q
5	Brendan Hansen	United States	2:13.13	Q
6	Ed Moses	United States	2:13.27	Q
7	Davide Rummolo	Italy	2:13.40	Q
8	Daniel Málek	Czech Republic	2:13.75	Q
9	Morgan Knabe	Canada	2:14.11	
10	José Couto	Portugal	2:15.27	
11	Martin Gustafsson	Sweden	2:15.32	
12	Hugues Duboscq	France	2:15.87	
13	Jakob Jóhann Sveinsson	Iceland	2:16.61	
14	Yoshiaki Okita	Japan	2:17.02	
–	Dmitri Komornikov	Russia	DSQ	
–	Ian Edmond	United Kingdom	DSQ	

=== Final ===
Rank	Name	Nationality	Time	Notes
1st place, gold medalist(s)	Brendan Hansen	United States	2:10.69	CR
2nd place, silver medalist(s)	Maxim Podoprigora	Austria	2:11.09	
3rd place, bronze medalist(s)	Kosuke Kitajima	Japan	2:11.21	
4	Domenico Fioravanti	Italy	2:11.31	
5	Ed Moses	United States	2:11.38	
6	Regan Harrison	Australia	2:11.51	
7	Davide Rummolo	Italy	2:12.89	
8	Daniel Málek	Czech Republic	2:13.19	
