= 2006 Pan Pacific Swimming Championships – Men's 100 metre breaststroke =

Men's 100 metre breaststroke at the 2006 Pan Pacific Swimming Championships
- Venue: Saanich Commonwealth Place
- Dates: August 18, 2006 (heats & finals)
- Competitors: 24 from 9 nations
- Winning time: 59.90

Medalists
gold medal	Brendan Hansen	United States
silver medal	Brenton Rickard	Australia
bronze medal	Kosuke Kitajima	Japan

The men's 100 metre breaststroke competition at the 2006 Pan Pacific Swimming Championships took place on August 18 at the Saanich Commonwealth Place. The last champion was Kosuke Kitajima of Japan.

This race consisted of two lengths of the pool, both lengths being in breaststroke.

== Records ==
Prior to this competition, the existing world and Pan Pacific records were as follows:

World record	Brendan Hansen (USA)	59.13	Irvine, United States	August 5, 2006
Pan Pacific Championships record	Kosuke Kitajima (JPN)	1:00.34	Yokohama, Japan	August 24, 2002

== Results ==
All times are in minutes and seconds.

KEY:	q	Fastest non-qualifiers	Q	Qualified	CR	Championships record	NR	National record	PB	Personal best	SB	Seasonal best

=== Heats ===
The first round was held on August 18, at 10:33.

Rank	Heat	Lane	Name	Nationality	Time	Notes
1	3	4	Brendan Hansen	United States	1:00.17	QA, CR
2	2	5	Brenton Rickard	Australia	1:00.79	QA
3	2	4	Kosuke Kitajima	Japan	1:00.87	QA
4	1	5	Scott Usher	United States	1:01.11	QA
5	3	5	Mark Gangloff	United States	1:01.80	QA
6	2	6	Yuta Suenaga	Japan	1:01.93	QA
7	3	6	Michael Brown	Canada	1:01.99	QA
8	1	4	Makoto Yamashita	Japan	1:02.02	QA
9	1	3	Henrique Barbosa	Brazil	1:02.36	QB
10	2	3	Genki Imamura	Japan	1:02.45	QB
11	1	6	Scott Dickens	Canada	1:02.68	QB
12	3	1	William Diering	South Africa	1:02.80	QB
13	3	7	Daisuke Kimura	Japan	1:02.99	QB
14	3	2	Mathieu Bois	Canada	1:03.02	QB
15	3	3	Matthew Lowe	United States	1:03.17	QB
16	2	7	Glenn Snyders	New Zealand	1:03.47	QB
17	1	7	Neil Versfeld	South Africa	1:03.68	
18	2	2	Felipe Lima	Brazil	1:03.94	
19	1	2	Cameron van der Burgh	South Africa	1:04.29	
20	3	8	Sin Su-Jong	South Korea	1:05.00	
21	2	1	Chiang Hsin-Hung	Chinese Taipei	1:05.39	
22	1	1	Wang Wei-Wen	Chinese Taipei	1:05.80	
23	2	8	Bryan Mell	Canada	1:07.04	
24	1	8	Bogdan Knezevic	Canada	1:07.21	

=== B Final ===
The B final was held on August 18, at 18:46.

Rank	Lane	Name	Nationality	Time	Notes
9	4	Mark Gangloff	United States	1:01.66	
10	5	Makoto Yamashita	Japan	1:02.14	
11	6	Mathieu Bois	Canada	1:02.68	
12	2	Glenn Snyders	New Zealand	1:02.71	
13	3	William Diering	South Africa	1:02.98	
14	7	Neil Versfeld	South Africa	1:04.18	
15	8	Sin Su-Jong	South Korea	1:04.40	
16	1	Felipe Lima	Brazil	1:04.90	

=== A Final ===
The A final was held on August 18, at 18:46.

Rank	Lane	Name	Nationality	Time	Notes
1st place, gold medalist(s)	4	Brendan Hansen	United States	59.90	CR
2nd place, silver medalist(s)	5	Brenton Rickard	Australia	1:00.39	
3rd place, bronze medalist(s)	3	Kosuke Kitajima	Japan	1:00.90	
4	6	Scott Usher	United States	1:01.39	
5	7	Michael Brown	Canada	1:01.58	
6	2	Yuta Suenaga	Japan	1:02.16	
7	8	Scott Dickens	Canada	1:02.38	
8	1	Henrique Barbosa	Brazil	1:02.49	
