= Brendan Hansen =

American swimmer (born 1981)

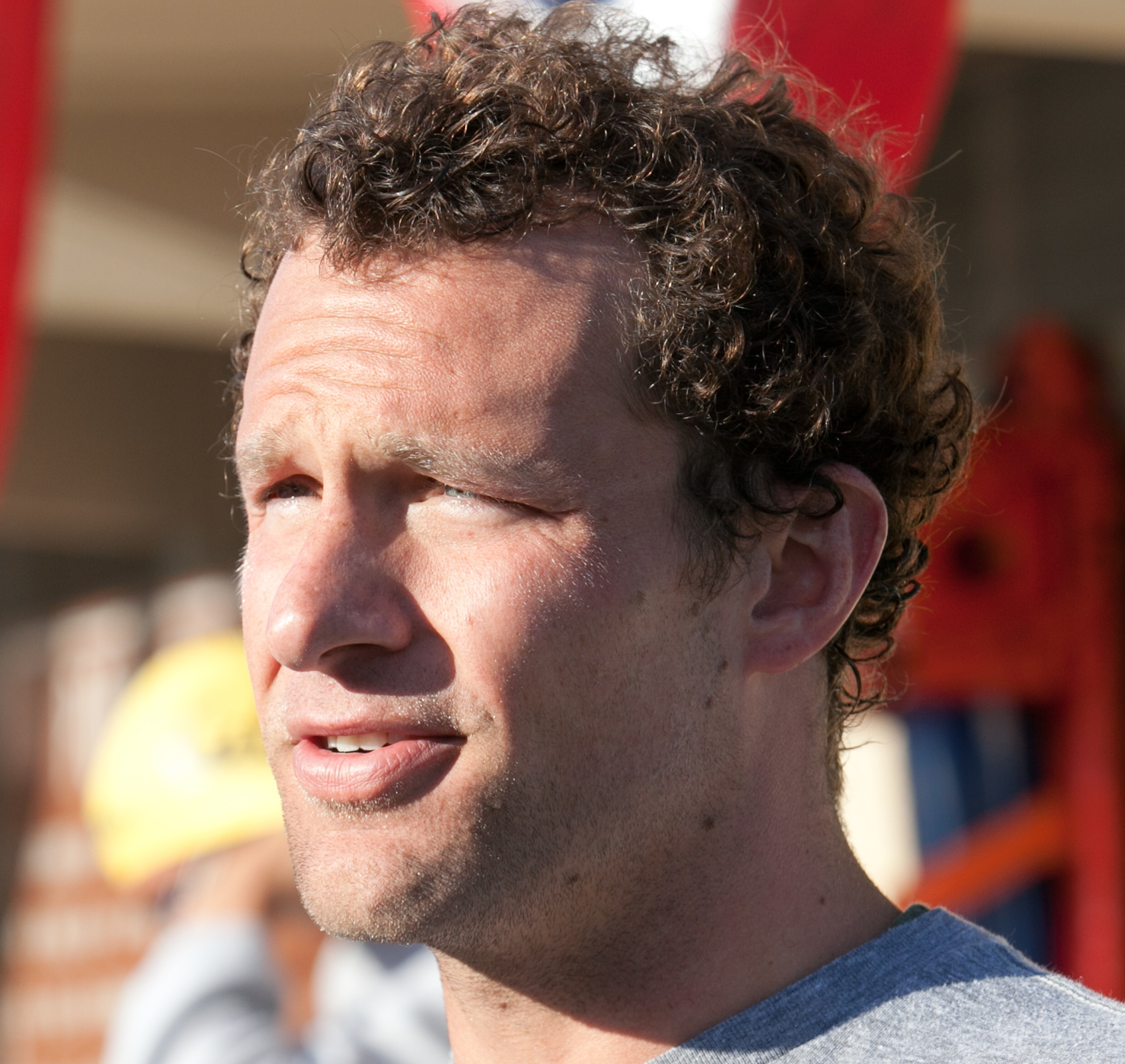

Personal information
- Full name: Brendan Joseph Hansen
- National team: United States
- Born: August 15, 1981 (age 45) Haverford Township, PA, U.S.
- Occupations: Swim Coach, Austin Aquatics; Aquatics Operation Manager; US Jr. National Team Director
- Height: 6 ft 0 in (183 cm)
- Weight: 189 lb (86 kg)
- Spouse: Martha
- Children: 2
- Website: https://brendanhansen.com/

Sport
- Sport: Swimming
- Event: 100, 200 breaststroke
- Strokes: Breaststroke
- Club: Foxcatcher Farms Swim Club (Early); Karakung Swim Club (High School); Suburban Swim Center (Sea Hawks); Longhorn Aquatics Austin, Tx. Circle Club, Austin, Tx.
- College team: University of Texas
- Coach: John McFadden (Foxcatcher); Tim Galvin, C. Lesovitz (Karakung); Charles Kennedy (Suburban SC); Eddie Reese, Kris Kubik (U. Texas)
Medal record
Men's swimming
Representing United States
Event	1st	2nd	3rd
Olympic Games	3	1	2
World Championships (LC)	6	2	1
World Championships (SC)	4	0	0
Pan Pacific Championships	5	1	0
Total	18	4	3
Olympic Games
Gold medal – first place	2004 Athens	4×100 m medley
Gold medal – first place	2008 Beijing	4×100 m medley
Gold medal – first place	2012 London	4×100 m medley
Silver medal – second place	2004 Athens	100 m breaststroke
Bronze medal – third place	2004 Athens	200 m breaststroke
Bronze medal – third place	2012 London	100 m breaststroke
World Championships (LC)
Gold medal – first place	2001 Fukuoka	200 m breaststroke
Gold medal – first place	2003 Barcelona	4×100 m medley
Gold medal – first place	2005 Montreal	100 m breaststroke
Gold medal – first place	2005 Montreal	200 m breaststroke
Gold medal – first place	2005 Montreal	4×100 m medley
Gold medal – first place	2007 Melbourne	100 m breaststroke
Silver medal – second place	2003 Barcelona	100 m breaststroke
Silver medal – second place	2007 Melbourne	50 m breaststroke
Bronze medal – third place	2003 Barcelona	200 m breaststroke
World Championships (SC)
Gold medal – first place	2004 Indianapolis	50 m breaststroke
Gold medal – first place	2004 Indianapolis	100 m breaststroke
Gold medal – first place	2004 Indianapolis	200 m breaststroke
Gold medal – first place	2004 Indianapolis	4×100 m medley
Pan Pacific Championships
Gold medal – first place	2002 Yokohama	200 m breaststroke
Gold medal – first place	2002 Yokohama	4×100 m medley
Gold medal – first place	2006 Victoria	100 m breaststroke
Gold medal – first place	2006 Victoria	200 m breaststroke
Gold medal – first place	2006 Victoria	4×100 m medley
Silver medal – second place	2002 Yokohama	100 m breaststroke

Brendan Joseph Hansen (born August 15, 1981) is an American former competition swimmer who specialized in breaststroke events. Hansen is a six-time Olympic medalist including three gold, a silver and two bronze medals, and a former world record-holder in both the 100-meter and 200-meter breaststroke events (long course). After his competitive career ended after the 2012 Olympics, by 2015 he worked as a Coach and operations manager for Austin Aquatics, and in 2025 was appointed as a Director for the U.S. Junior National team.

He won twenty-five medals in major international competitions, eighteen gold, four silver, and three bronze spanning the Olympics, the World, and the Pan Pacific Championships. He was a member of the 2004, 2008 and 2012 United States Olympic teams winning gold in the 4×100 m medley at all three. He won bronze and silver medals in the 200 metre breaststroke and 100 metre breaststroke respectively at the 2004 Summer Olympics and bronze in the 100-meter breaststroke at the 2012 Summer Olympics.

== Early life and swimming ==
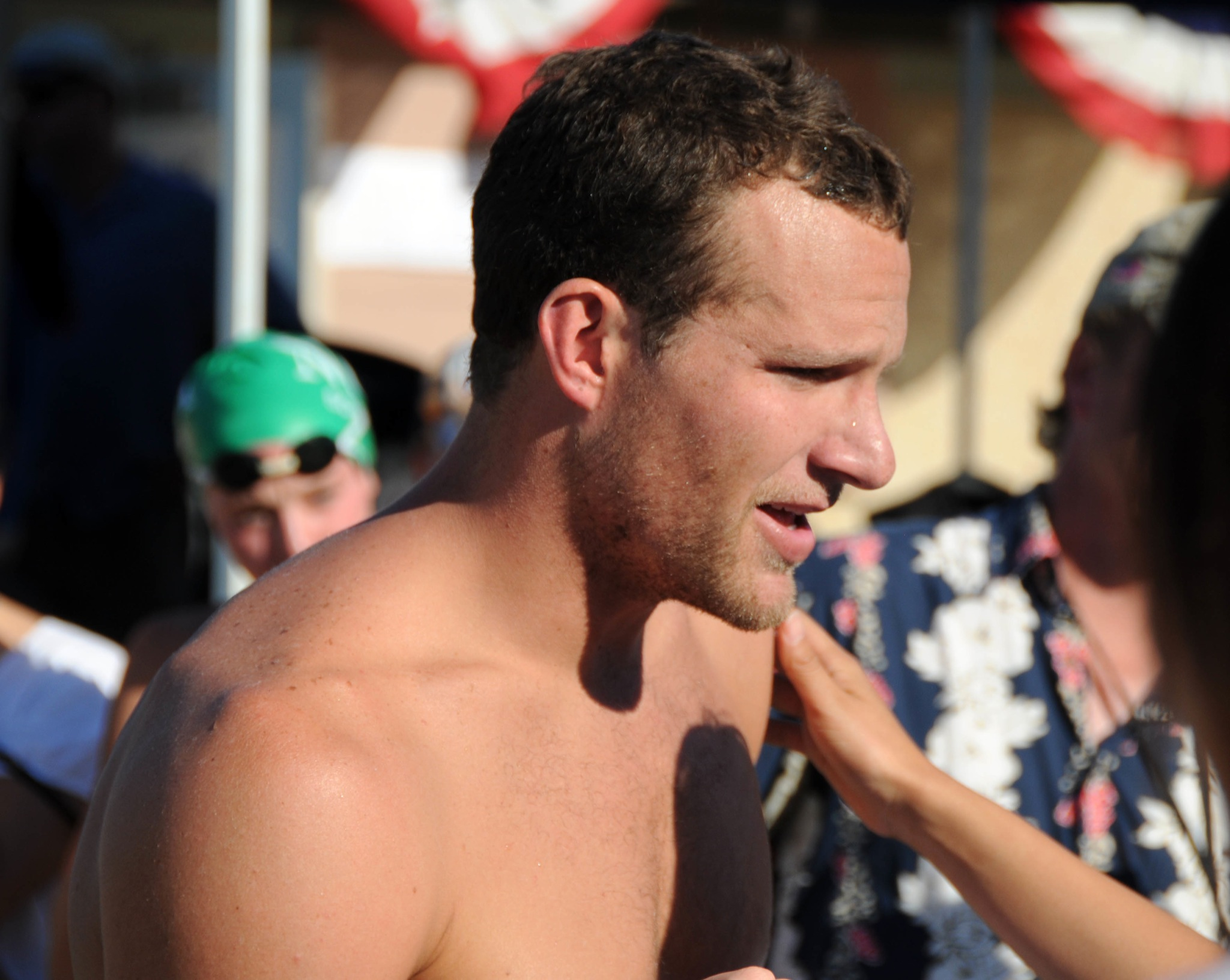
Hansen in 2008

Hansen was born on August 15, 1981, the son of mother Miriam Hansen and grew up in Havertown, a Philadelphia, Pennsylvania suburb. He attended Haverford Senior High School, graduating in June, 2000. Representing Haverford High, Brendan was a state champion four times. From a family that valued the sport of swimming, his older brother Sean worked as an Assistant Athletic Director and coached swimming for Haverford Prep, also known as The Haverford School, a private boys school, distinct from the public school Haverford High. Sean was a competitive swimmer for Haverford High School and a multi-stroke competitor like Brendan. Sean later swam for Lafayette College, breaking a school record in the 400 Individual Medley. Highly supportive of his swimming career, Brendan's mother Miriam served as a Pennsylvania Interscholastic Athletic Association official who helped with the supervision of several NCAA and high school meets.

Brendan swam for several clubs during his early career, including the demanding program at Foxcatcher Farms Swim Club, just west of Philadelphia in Newton Township. At Foxcatcher, one of Hansen's first coaches was John McFadden, a specialist in teaching young swimmers stroke technique. Familiar with multi-stroke competition, McFadden was an All American in Butterfly in High School, had coached at Drexel University and Lower Merion High School and was particularly skilled in working with swimmers as early as Elementary School. In High School Hansen swam for Karakung Swim Club and the Suburban Seahawks Club. At the Suburban Seahawks, beginning at the age of 14, Hansen was trained and managed by important early Coach Charles Kennedy. Hansen swam for the Karakung team in High School largely during his summers, where he was trained and competed for Coaches Timothy Galvin and Christopher Lesovitz, and briefly coached the team in 2000. By February 1999, Hansen had the best national time for a 16-year old swimmer in the 100-yard breaststroke with a former time of 54.7 seconds recorded in 1998. In early 1999, he was rated 21st globally for all ages in the 100-meter breaststroke with a time of 1:02.69, and was 24th in the world in the 200-meter breaststroke with a time of 2:16.5.

=== University of Texas Austin ===
While attending the University of Texas at Austin, Hansen swam for coach Eddie Reese and Associate Coach Kris Kubik's Texas Longhorns swimming and diving team in the National Collegiate Athletic Association (NCAA) competition from 2001 to 2004. Swimming for UT Austin, he was a swim team captain three years, and was unique in never losing a breaststroke event. He was a sixteen-time All-American and won NCAA national championships fourteen times. Notably, during his four years of collegiate competition, he won every breaststroke event offered in the NCAA National Championships, in short, an NCAA champion in the 100 meter Breaststroke all four years, and an NCAA national champion in the 200 meter breaststroke all four years. He graduated from the University of Texas with a Bachelor's degree in kinesiology in 2005. While at Texas, Hansen's primary competitive stroke remained the breaststroke. He was well known for his unique breaststroke technique, which incorporated a kick that was significantly narrower than most other swimmers, including a common early rival in his career, Kosuke Kitajima.

== Swimming career ==
=== 2000 ===
At the 2000 Olympic trials in Indianapolis, Hansen missed qualifying for the 2000 Summer Olympics, placing third in 100 meter breaststroke with a time of 1:01.74 and third again in the 200 meter breaststroke with a time of 2:13.49. Competitors were required to have a first or second-place finish to qualify for the U.S. 2000 Olympic swimming team.

=== 2001–2003 ===
At the 2001 World Aquatics Championships in Fukuoka, Japan, Hansen won the 200-meter breaststroke with a time of 2:10.69, a championship record.

At the 2003 World Aquatics Championships in Barcelona, Spain, Hansen won gold in the 4×100-meter medley relay, silver in the 100-meter breaststroke, and bronze in the 200-meter breaststroke. In his first event, the 100-meter breaststroke, Hansen finished second to Kosuke Kitajima with a time of 1:00.21. In his second event, the 200-meter breaststroke, Hansen finished in third place with a time of 2:11.11. In the 4×100-meter medley relay, Hansen swam his leg with a time of 59.61 seconds, and the American squad finished first with a world record time of 3:31.54.

== 2004 Olympics ==
Despite setting the world record in the 100-meter and 200-meter breaststroke at the 2004 U.S. Olympic trials, Hansen did not manage to win a gold medal in either event at the 2004 Athens Olympics, as he settled for silver in the 100 with a time of 1:00.25, and a bronze in the 200 with a time of 2:10.87. He would win a gold for his role in the world-record-setting 4 × 100 medley relay that swam a combined time of 3:30.68. There was controversy over Kosuke Kitajima's win in the 100-meter breaststroke. The U.S. team accused Kitajima of using an illegal dolphin kick. However, Olympic officials declined to issue any penalty.

=== 2005 World Championships ===
At the 2005 World Aquatics Championships in Montreal, Quebec, Hansen won gold in the 100-meter breaststroke, 200-meter breaststroke, and 4×100-meter medley relay. In his first event, the 100-meter breaststroke, Hansen won with a time of 59.37 seconds, a championship record. In his second event, the 200-meter breaststroke, Hansen won with a time of 2:09.85. In the 4×100-meter medley relay, Hansen swam his leg with a time of 59.33, and the U.S. squad finished first with a time of 3:31.85.

=== 2006 ===
At the 2006 ConocoPhillips National Championships, Hansen lowered both his world records in the 100-meter and 200-meter breaststroke to 59.13 seconds in the 100-meter and 2:08.74 in the 200-meter.

At the 2006 Pan Pacific Swimming Championships held in Victoria, Canada, Hansen again lowered his world record time in the 200-meter breaststroke to 2:08.50. It is notable that he was a quarter of a second behind his best time at the 150-meter mark, but he completed the last 50 meters, 0.60 of a second faster with a 33.38.

=== 2007 World Championships ===
At the 2007 World Aquatics Championships in Melbourne, Australia, Hansen won gold in the 100-meter breaststroke and silver in the 50-meter breaststroke. Hansen also was entered in the 200-meter breaststroke but did not start. In the 100-meter breaststroke, Hansen won with a time of 59.80 seconds, 0.16 faster than second-place finisher Kosuke Kitajima. This victory made him the first and so far only four-time breaststroke world champion (long course). In the 50-meter breaststroke, Hansen place second with a time of 27.69 seconds, just 0.03 slower than first-place finisher Oleh Lisohor.

== 2008 Olympics ==
Hansen swam the 100-meter breaststroke at the 2008 Beijing Olympics, his only individual event, finishing in fourth place, but earned a gold medal as a member of the winning U.S. team in the 4×100-meter medley relay swimming a combined team time of 3:29.34. He lost the medal while on a flight home from a party in his hometown near Philadelphia to Austin; it was given back to him the next day.

=== 2011 Nationals ===
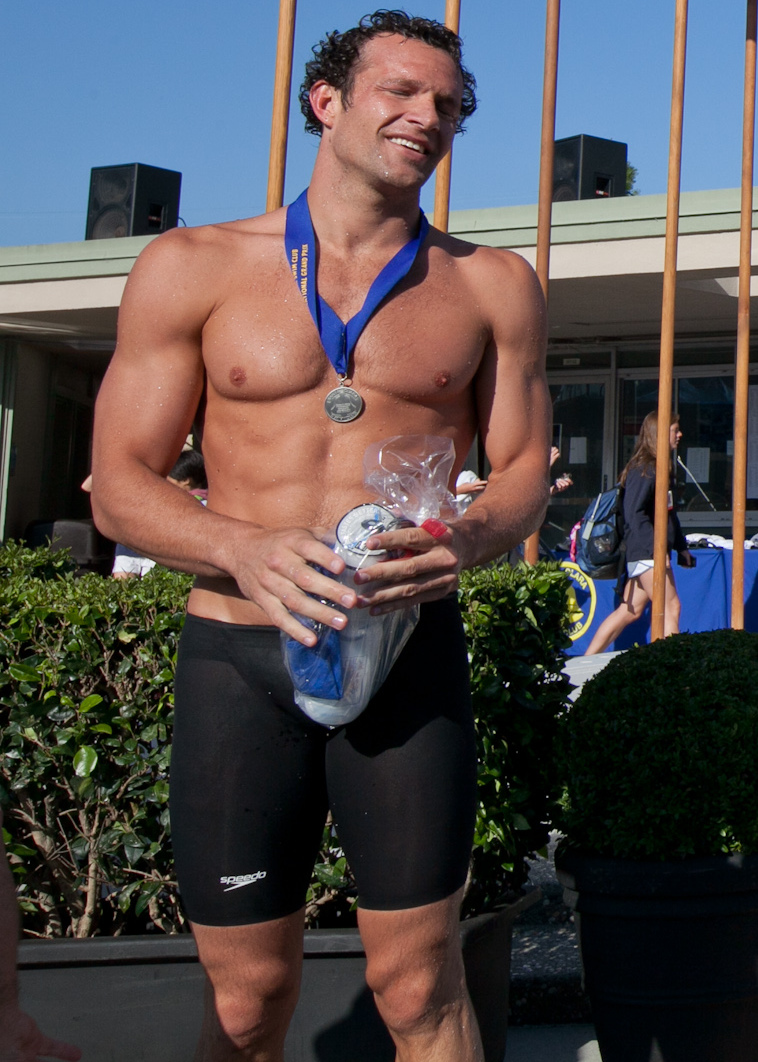
Hansen in 2011

Hansen prepared for a comeback at the 2012 Summer Olympics, winning the 100-meter breaststroke and 200-meter breaststroke at the U.S. Nationals with times of 1:00.08 and 2:10.59 respectively.

== 2012 Olympics ==
At the 2012 United States Olympic Trials in Omaha, Nebraska, the qualifying meet for the U.S. Olympic Team, Hansen won the 100-meter breaststroke final, qualifying him to swim in that event and the 4×100-meter medley relay at the 2012 Summer Olympics. He also finished fourth in the 200-meter breaststroke.

At the 2012 Summer Olympics in London, Hansen finished third in 100-meter breaststroke for a bronze medal with a time of 59.49, and won a gold medal as a member of the winning U.S. team in the 4×100-meter medley relay with a combined time of 3:29.35. At the conclusion of the games, Hansen decided that the 2012 Olympics would be his final meet, retiring from elite swimming competition.

=== Honors ===
Hansen was inducted into the Philadelphia Sports Hall of Fame in 2024, and is a member of the University of Texas Hall of Honor. Recognized for his achievements as a swim coach, in 2015, he was a South Texas Swimming Small Team Coach of the Year, and in the following year, a South Texas Swimming Large Team Coach of the Year.

== Post-swimming career ==
After retiring from competitive swimming, beginning around 2015 he served as an Aquatics Operation manager for Austin Sports Academy and Aquatics and has worked as the head coach of Austin Aquatics Swim Club. He was appointed as a Director for the U.S. Junior National team in October, 2024. He served as a Head Coach at the Junior Pan Pacific Championships in 2022, and 2024. In other career pursuits, he worked as an analyst for telecasts of Longhorn Network swimming. He and wife, Martha, have resided in Austin and have daughters, Annie and Charlotte.

=== World Records, best times ===
Hansen is a former world record holder in the 100- and 200-meter breaststroke (long course), as well as the 4×100-meter medley relay (long and short course). His personal best times are:

=== Long Course ===
- 50 m Breast: 27.51 (March 27, 2007)
- 100 m Breast: 59.13 (August 1, 2006)
- 200 m Breast: 2:08.50 (August 21, 2006)

=== Short Course ===
- 50 m Breast: 26.86 (October 11, 2004)
- 100 m Breast: 57.47 (December 17, 2011)
- 200 m Breast: 2:03.62 (December 16, 2011)

== See also ==
- List of multiple Olympic gold medalists in one event
- List of Olympic medalists in swimming (men)
- List of United States records in swimming
- List of University of Texas at Austin alumni
- List of World Aquatics Championships medalists in swimming (men)
- World record progression 100 metres breaststroke
- World record progression 200 metres breaststroke
- World record progression 4 × 100 metres medley relay

Records
Preceded by Kosuke Kitajima	Men's 100-meter breaststroke world record-holder (long course); July 8, 2004 – August 11, 2008	Succeeded by Kosuke Kitajima
Preceded by Kosuke Kitajima	Men's 200-meter breaststroke world record-holder (long course); July 11, 2004 – June 8, 2008	Succeeded by Kosuke Kitajima
