= Victor Turchin =

Ukrainian swimming coach

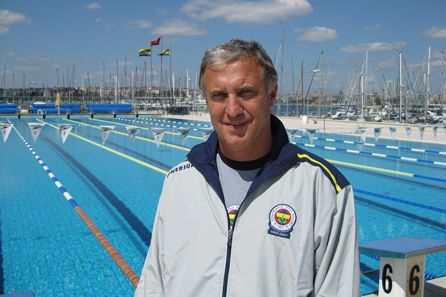
- Born: 12 October 1955 (age 70); Baku, Azerbaijan

Victor Anatol'evich Turchin (born 12 October 1955) is a Ukrainian swimming coach, best known for training multiple world gold medalist Oleg Lisogor through the 1990s to the early 2000s in his hometown of Brovary, Ukraine. Likewise, Victor Turchin has coached many different swimmers and who took part in the World University Games who have won 38 gold, 20 silver, 14 bronze medals.

== Career ==
- 1979 –1986 – worked at the Academy of Sciences of the USSR
- 1986 – coached at a swim school in Brovary, Kiyv region
- 1993 – worked at the Higher University of Sport Management
- 1998 – worked in republic SVSM (School of higher sport skills)
