= 2002 Pan Pacific Swimming Championships – Men's 4 × 100 metre medley relay =

Men's 4 × 100 metre medley relay at the 2002 Pan Pacific Swimming Championships
- Venue: Yokohama International Swimming Pool
- Dates: August 29, 2002 (heats & finals)
- Winning time: 3:33.48

Medalists
gold medal	Aaron Peirsol, Brendan Hansen, Michael Phelps and Jason Lezak	United States
silver medal	Matt Welsh, Jim Piper, Geoff Huegill and Ian Thorpe	Australia
bronze medal	Riley Janes, Mike Brown, Mike Mintenko and Brent Hayden	Canada

The men's 4 × 100 metre medley relay competition at the 2002 Pan Pacific Swimming Championships took place on August 29 at the Yokohama International Swimming Pool. The last champion was the United States.

== Records ==
Prior to this competition, the existing world and Pan Pacific records were as follows:

World record	United States (USA); Lenny Krayzelburg (53.87); Ed Moses (59.84); Ian Crocker (52.10); Gary Hall, Jr. (47.92)	3:33.73	Sydney, Australia	September 23, 2000
Pan Pacific Championships record	United States (USA); Lenny Krayzelburg (53.67); Kurt Grote (1:01.69); Dod Wales (52.49); Neil Walker (48.52)	3:36.37	Sydney, Australia	August 29, 1999

== Results ==
All times are in minutes and seconds.

KEY:	q	Fastest non-qualifiers	Q	Qualified	CR	Championships record	NR	National record	PB	Personal best	SB	Seasonal best

=== Heats ===
Heats weren't performed, as only six teams had entered.

=== Final ===
The final was held on August 29.

Rank	Lane	Name	Nationality	Time	Notes
1st place, gold medalist(s)	5	Aaron Peirsol (54.17); Brendan Hansen (1:00.14); Michael Phelps (51.13); Jason Lezak (48.04)	United States	3:33.48	WR
2nd place, silver medalist(s)	4	Matt Welsh (54.52); Jim Piper (1:01.43); Geoff Huegill (51.69); Ian Thorpe (47.20)	Australia	3:34.84	
3rd place, bronze medalist(s)	6	Riley Janes (56.07); Mike Brown (1:01.01); Mike Mintenko (51.91); Brent Hayden (48.58)	Canada	3:38.17	
4	3	Tomomi Morita (55.16); Yoshihisa Yamaguchi (1:01.60); Takashi Yamamoto (52.38); Daisuke Hosokawa (49.92)	Japan	3:39.06	
5	7	Cléber Costa (57.69); Henrique Barbosa (1:03.89); Hugo Duppré (54.98); André Cordeiro (51.44)	Brazil	3:48.00	
6	2	Scott Talbot (57.28); Kieran Daly (1:05.36); Moss Burmester (55.30); Cameron Gibson (51.59)	New Zealand	3:49.53	
-	1	- - - -	Hong Kong	DNS	
-	8	- - - -	Singapore	DNS	
