= Yohann Bernard =

French swimmer (born 1974)

Personal information
- Born: 7 August 1974 (age 52) Dunkerque, France
- Height: 188 cm (6 ft 2 in)
- Weight: 80 kg (176 lb)

Sport
- Sport: Swimming
Medal record
Representing France
European Championships (LC)
Silver medal – second place	2002 Berlin	200 m breaststroke
Bronze medal – third place	1999 Istanbul	200 m breaststroke

Yohann Bernard (born 7 August 1974) is a breaststroke swimmer from France.

== Career ==
Bernard won the bronze medal in the men's 200 metres breaststroke event at the 1999 European Championships in Istanbul. He represented his native country at the 2000 Summer Olympics in Sydney, Australia, where he finished in seventh place in the 200 m breaststroke, clocking 02:13.31 in the final.
