= Michael Taylor (swimmer) =

Marshallese swimmer

Personal information
- Born: 1989 (age 36–37)

Sport
- Sport: Swimming

Michael Taylor (born 1989) is a national team swimmer from the Marshall Islands. He has swum for the Marshall Islands at the 2005, 2007 and 2009 FINA World Championships.
