= Loris Facci =

Italian swimmer (born 1983)

Personal information
- Nationality: Italian
- Born: 13 August 1983 (age 42) Turin, Italy
- Height: 1.86 m (6 ft 1 in)

Sport
- Sport: Swimming
- Strokes: Breaststroke
- Club: Rari Nantes Torino
Medal record
World Championships (LC)
Bronze medal – third place	2007 Melbourne	200m Breaststroke

Loris Facci (born 13 August 1983) is an Italian breaststroke swimmer. He won the on bronze medal in the men's 200 metres breaststroke event at the 2007 World Championships. He represented his native country at the 2004 Summer Olympics in Athens, Greece.
