= Sergey Voytsekhovich =

Uzbekistani swimmer (born 1982)

Personal information
- Full name: Sergey Voytsekhovich
- National team: Uzbekistan
- Born: 26 September 1982 (age 43) Tashkent, Uzbek SSR, Soviet Union
- Height: 1.84 m (6 ft 0 in)
- Weight: 76 kg (168 lb)

Sport
- Sport: Swimming
- Strokes: Breaststroke

Sergey Voytsekhovich (Uzbek: Сергей Войцехович; born September 26, 1982) is an Uzbek former swimmer, who specialized in breaststroke events. Voytsekhovich competed only in the men's 200 m breaststroke at the 2000 Summer Olympics in Sydney. He achieved a FINA B-standard entry time of 2:21.98 from the Kazakhstan Open Championships in Almaty. He challenged five other swimmers in heat two, including Kyrgyzstan's Alexander Tkachev, a bronze medalist for former Russian squad at the World Championships. With only one swimmer scratched from his heat, Voytsekhovich closed out the field to last place by almost a 15-second deficit behind winner Tkachev in 2:30.23. Voytsekhovich failed to advance into the semifinals, as he placed forty-sixth overall in the prelims.
