= Mladen Tepavčević =

Serbian swimmer (born 1976)

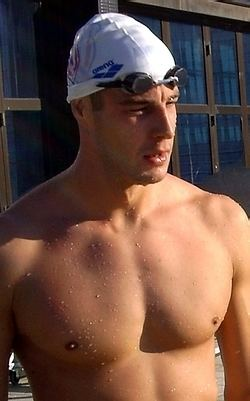
- Mladen Tepavcevic in 2019.

Personal information
- Full name: Mladen Tepavčević
- Nationality: Serbia (2006-on); Serbia and Montenegro (2004-2006); Yugoslavia (?-2003)
- Born: October 26, 1976 (age 49) Sarajevo, Yugoslavia
- Height: 2.00 m (6 ft 7 in)

Sport
- Sport: Swimming
- Strokes: Breaststroke

Mladen Tepavčević (Serbian Cyrillic: Младен Тепавчевић; born October 26, 1976, in Sarajevo, Yugoslavia) is an Olympic swimmer from Serbia. He swam for Serbia and Montenegro at the 2004 Olympics. He also qualified to represent Serbia at the 2008 Olympics, however, he did not swim.

Tepavčević holds the Serbian record in all men's breaststroke events (50-m 0:28.10; 100-m 1:02.60 and 200-m 2:22.54). He has competed for Serbia and Montenegro at the 2004 Summer Olympics in Athens, Greece in the 100 m breaststroke, where he registered a time of 1:03.52, enough for an overall 29th position out of 60 swimmers.

He qualified for the 2008 Summer Olympics with the 1:02.80 he swam for 33rd at the 2007 World Aquatics Championships in the 100 m breaststroke.

He also swam at the 2003 and 2005 World Championships.

== See also ==
- List of Serbian records in swimming
