= Vladimir Labzin =

Estonian swimmer

Personal information
- Born: February 20, 1983 (age 43) Tallinn, then part of Estonian SSR, Soviet Union

Sport
- Sport: Swimming
- Strokes: Breaststroke
Medal record
Representing Estonia
European Junior Championships
Bronze medal – third place	2001 Valletta	200m breaststroke

Vladimir Labzin (born 20 February 1983) is an Estonian swimmer.

He was born in Tallinn. In 1999 he finished his 10th grade at Estonian Sports Gymnasium. In 2002 he graduated from college in Catalonia, Spain, and in 2011, from the University of Barcelona in business management speciality.

He began his swimming career in 1990 when he joined the Tallinna Kalev's swimming school. In late-1990s he moved to Spain. 1999–2002 he excelled his swimming skills at the club C.N. Montjuic, and after that at the club C.E. Mediterrani. He won a bronze medal at the 2001 European Junior Swimming Championships. He is one-time Estonian champion in swimming (1998). 2000–2005 he was a member of Estonian national swimming team.

In 2001 he was named the Best Male Swimmer of Estonia.
