= Johannes Neumann =

German swimmer

Personal information
- Born: 5 November 1985 (age 40) Leipzig, Germany

Sport
- Sport: Swimming
- Club: SC Wiesbaden 1911, SC Riesa, DJK Sportbund Regensburg, SG Region München
Medal record
Men's swimming
Representing Germany
European Championships (SC)
Gold medal – first place	2006 Helsinki	4×50 m medley

Johannes Neumann (born 5 November 1985) is a German breaststroke swimmer who won a gold medal in the 4×50 m medley relay at the European Short Course Swimming Championships 2006, setting a new world record.
