= Omar Jasim =

Bahraini swimmer

Personal information
- Born: September 23, 1990 (age 35)

Sport
- Sport: Swimming

Omar Jasim (born September 23, 1990) is a Bahraini swimmer. He competed at the 2008 Summer Olympics.

His personal best for 50 m freestyle is 30.63 seconds (at 2008 Olympics).
