= Andrei Capitanciuc =

Moldovan swimmer (born 1985)

Personal information
- Full name: Andrei Capitanciuc
- National team: Moldova
- Born: 28 May 1985 (age 41) Ulaanbaatar, Mongolia
- Height: 1.78 m (5 ft 10 in)
- Weight: 62 kg (137 lb)

Sport
- Sport: Swimming
- Strokes: Breaststroke

Andrei Capitanciuc (born May 28, 1985) is a Moldovan former swimmer, who specialized in breaststroke events. Capitanciuc qualified for the men's 100 m breaststroke at the 2004 Summer Olympics in Athens, by achieving a FINA B-standard of 1:04.98 from the Russian Open Championships in Moscow. He challenged seven other swimmers in heat two, including three-time Olympians Jean Luc Razakarivony of Madagascar and Yevgeny Petrashov of Kyrgyzstan. He shared a second seed with Saudi Arabia's Ahmed Al-Kudmani in a time of 1:05.65. Capitanciuc failed to advance into the semifinals, as he placed forty-seventh overall out of 60 swimmers on the first day of preliminaries.
