= Jim Piper =

Australian swimmer

Personal information
- Full name: Jim Alan Piper
- National team: Australia
- Born: 13 August 1981 (age 45) Campbelltown, New South Wales
- Height: 1.87 m (6 ft 2 in)
- Weight: 82 kg (181 lb)

Sport
- Sport: Swimming
- Strokes: Breaststroke
Medal record
Men's swimming
Representing Australia
World Championships (SC)
Gold medal – first place	2002 Moscow	200 m breaststroke
Silver medal – second place	2002 Moscow	4×100 m medley
Pan Pacific Championships
Silver medal – second place	2002 Yokohama	200 m breaststroke
Silver medal – second place	2002 Yokohama	4×100 m medley
Bronze medal – third place	2002 Yokohama	100 m breaststroke
Commonwealth Games
Gold medal – first place	2002 Manchester	200 m breaststroke
Gold medal – first place	2002 Manchester	4 x 100 m medley relay
Bronze medal – third place	2006 Melbourne	200 m breaststroke

Jim Alan Piper (born 13 August 1981) is a former Olympic breaststroke swimmer from Australia. He swam for Australia at the:

- Olympics: 2004
- World Championships: 2003, 2005, 2007
- Commonwealth Games: 2002, 2006
- Pan Pacific Championships: 2002
- Short Course Worlds: 2002

At the 2004 Summer Olympics in Athens, he finished 19th in the 100-metre breaststroke and was a member of Australia's 9th-place men's 4×100-metre medley relay team. He also reached and swam in the final heat of the 200-metre breaststroke, where he was disqualified for using an illegal kick.

At the 2002 Commonwealth Games, he won the 200-metre breaststroke. Four years later, at the 2006 Commonwealth Games, he finished third in the event.

At the 2002 Short Course Worlds, he won the 200-metre breaststroke in a new meet record (2:07.16).

As of 2013, he is a board member of Swimming Western Australia, a state federation of Swimming Australia.

== See also ==
- List of Commonwealth Games medallists in swimming (men)
