= Sławomir Kuczko =

Polish swimmer

Personal information
- Born: 25 June 1985 (age 41) Koszalin, Poland
Medal record
Men's swimming
Representing Poland
European Championships (LC)
Gold medal – first place	2006 Budapest	200 m breaststroke
European Championships (SC)
Gold medal – first place	2005 Trieste	200 m breaststroke
Silver medal – second place	2004 Vienna	200 m breaststroke
Silver medal – second place	2006 Helsinki	200 m breaststroke
Summer Universiade
Gold medal – first place	2005 Izmir	200 m breaststroke

Sławomir Kuczko (born 25 June 1985 in Koszalin) is a Polish swimmer, whose specialty is the breaststroke. He is a European champion, having won the men's 200 m breaststroke at the 2006 European Championships.

In 2006, he also set the Polish Record in the short-course 200 breaststroke at 2:06.61 at the 2006 Short Course European Championships.

In 2012, Kuczko represented Poland at the Olympic Games, swimming the 200 m breaststroke. He placed second in heat no. 2, not qualifying to advance to the semi-finals.

== European Championships medal history ==
Medal	Event	Year
Gold	Men's 200 m breaststroke	2006

== European Short Course Championships medal history ==
Medal	Event	Year
Gold	Men's 200 m breaststroke	2005
Silver	Men's 200 m breaststroke	2004
Silver	Men's 200 m breaststroke	2006
