= Oleh Lisohor =

Ukrainian swimmer (born 1979)

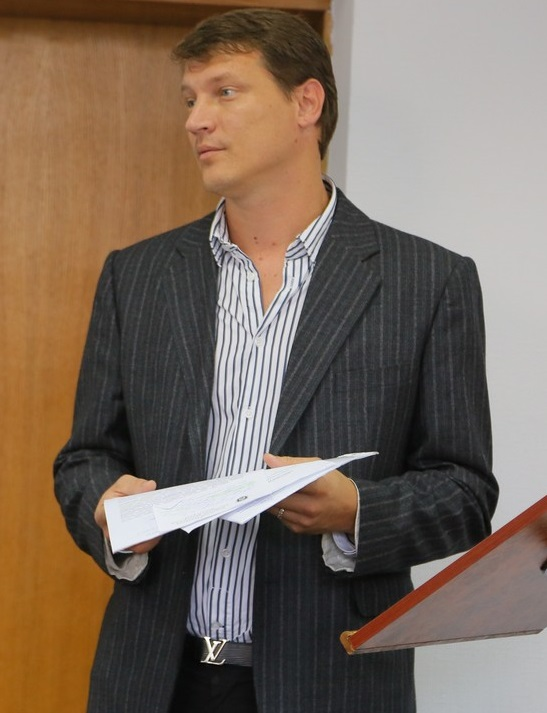
- during a reporting

Personal information
- Full name: Олег Лісогор
- Nationality: Ukraine
- Born: 17 January 1979 (age 47) Brovary, Soviet Union
- Height: 192 cm (76 in)
- Weight: 92 kg (203 lb)

Sport
- Sport: Swimming
- Strokes: Breaststroke
- Club: Meteor
- Coach: Victor Turchin
Medal record
Event	1st	2nd	3rd
World Championships (LC)	2	1	0
World Championships (SC)	5	0	3
European Championships (LC)	7	3	3
European Championships (SC)	12	7	4
Universiade	6	1	1
Military World Games	1	1	2
European Junior Swimming Championships	0	1	1
Total	33	14	14
World Championships (LC)
Gold medal – first place	2001 Fukuoka	50 m breaststroke
Gold medal – first place	2007 Melbourne	50 m breaststroke
Silver medal – second place	2003 Barcelona	50 m breaststroke
Short Course Worlds
Gold medal – first place	2002 Moscow	50 m breaststroke
Gold medal – first place	2002 Moscow	100 m breaststroke
Gold medal – first place	2006 Shanghai	100 m breaststroke
Gold medal – first place	2006 Shanghai	50 m breaststroke
Gold medal – first place	2008 Manchester	50 m breaststroke
Bronze medal – third place	2000 Athens	50 m breaststroke
Bronze medal – third place	2006 Shanghai	4×100 m medley relay
Bronze medal – third place	2008 Manchester	100 m breaststroke
European Championships (LC)
Gold medal – first place	2002 Berlin	50 m breaststroke
Gold medal – first place	2002 Berlin	100 m breaststroke
Gold medal – first place	2004 Madrid	50 m breaststroke
Gold medal – first place	2004 Madrid	100 m breaststroke
Gold medal – first place	2004 Madrid	4×100 m medley
Gold medal – first place	2006 Budapest	50 m breaststroke
Gold medal – first place	2008 Eindhoven	50 m breaststroke
Silver medal – second place	1999 Istanbul	50 m breaststroke
Silver medal – second place	2000 Helsinki	50 m breaststroke
Silver medal – second place	2006 Budapest	4×100 m medley
Bronze medal – third place	2000 Helsinki	4×100 m medley
Bronze medal – third place	2006 Budapest	100 m breaststroke
Bronze medal – third place	2008 Eindhoven	100 m breaststroke
European Championships (SC)
Gold medal – first place	2001 Antwerp	50 m breaststroke
Gold medal – first place	2001 Antwerp	100 m breaststroke
Gold medal – first place	2001 Antwerp	4×50 m freestyle
Gold medal – first place	2002 Riesa	50 m breaststroke
Gold medal – first place	2002 Riesa	100 m breaststroke
Gold medal – first place	2003 Dublin	50 m breaststroke
Gold medal – first place	2004 Vienna	50 m breaststroke
Gold medal – first place	2005 Trieste	50 m breaststroke
Gold medal – first place	2005 Trieste	100 m breaststroke
Gold medal – first place	2006 Helsinki	50 m breaststroke
Gold medal – first place	2006 Helsinki	100 m breaststroke
Gold medal – first place	2007 Debrecen	50 m breaststroke
Silver medal – second place	1999 Lisbon	50 m breaststroke
Silver medal – second place	2000 Valencia	4×50 m medley
Silver medal – second place	2003 Dublin	100 m breaststroke
Silver medal – second place	2004 Vienna	100 m breaststroke
Silver medal – second place	2004 Vienna	4×50 m medley
Silver medal – second place	2005 Trieste	100 m medley
Silver medal – second place	2005 Trieste	4×50 m medley
Bronze medal – third place	2002 Riesa	100 m medley
Bronze medal – third place	2002 Riesa	4×50 m freestyle
Bronze medal – third place	2002 Riesa	4×50 m medley
Bronze medal – third place	2003 Dublin	4×50 m freestyle
Summer Universiade
Gold medal – first place	2001 Beijing	50 m breaststroke
Gold medal – first place	2001 Beijing	100 m breaststroke
Gold medal – first place	2003 Daegu	4×100 m medley
Gold medal – first place	2005 Izmir	50 m breaststroke
Gold medal – first place	2005 Izmir	100 m breaststroke
Gold medal – first place	2005 Izmir	4×100 m medley
Silver medal – second place	2003 Daegu	50 m breaststroke
Bronze medal – third place	2003 Daegu	100 m breaststroke
Military World Games
Gold medal – first place	2007 Hyderabad	50 m breaststroke
Silver medal – second place	2007 Hyderabad	100 m breaststroke
Bronze medal – third place	2007 Hyderabad	200 m breaststroke
Bronze medal – third place	2007 Hyderabad	4x100 m medley
European Junior Championships
Silver medal – second place	1997 Glasgow	100 m breaststroke
Bronze medal – third place	1996 København	100 m breaststroke

Oleh Lisohor (born 17 January 1979 in Brovary, Kyiv Oblast, Soviet Union) is a Ukrainian swimmer.

== Career ==
Lisohor is the former world record holder in the 50 metres breaststroke, long course, with 27.18 seconds. The record was set in Berlin on 2 August 2002. Lisohor is also the former record holder over 50 metres breaststroke (short course). He took part in three Olympic Games. He won two world titles in the 50 m breaststroke, in 2001 and 2007. He made an appearance in Régis Wargnier's film East/West.

== See also ==
- World record progression 50 metres breaststroke

Records
Preceded by Ed Moses	World Record Holder; Men's 50 Breaststroke; 2 August 2002 – 18 April 2009	Succeeded by Cameron van der Burgh
Preceded by Ed Moses	World Record Holder; Men's 50 Breaststroke (25m); 26 January 2002 – 8 November 2008	Succeeded by Cameron van der Burgh
