= Alwin de Prins =

Luxembourgish swimmer

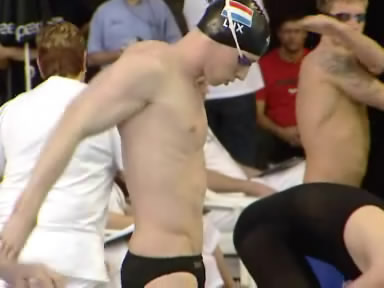

Personal information
- Born: October 29, 1978 (age 47) Dendermonde, Belgium

Sport
- Sport: Swimming
- Strokes: Breaststroke

Alwin de Prins (born 29 October 1978) is a former competitive swimmer who represented Luxembourg. Born in Dendermonde, Belgium, he first represented Luxembourg in 1995 at the European Championships in Vienna.

He swam in the 50 metre, 100 metre and 200 metre breaststroke and represented Luxembourg at the Sydney Olympics in 2000, the Athens Olympics in 2004 and the 2008 Summer Olympics in Beijing. His trainers were Klaus Juergen Ohk and Ingolf Bender (federation coach).

De Prins is a member of the board of directors and the Technical Commission of the Luxembourg Swimming Federation as well as member of the Athletic Commission of the Luxembourg National Olympic Committee. He is also secretary-general of the Luxembourg Association of Olympians.

In September 2008 he announced his retirement from competitive swimming on his blog.

== Personal bests ==
	Short Course	Long Course
50 m breaststroke	0:28.45 (Moscow, 6 April 2002)	0:29.02 (Montreal, 26 July 2005)
100 m breaststroke	1:01.50 (Berlin, 6 May 2000)	1:03.00 (Montreal, 24 July 2005)
200 m breaststroke	2:19.04 (Gothenburg, 19 April 1997)	2:19.00 (Istanbul, 28 July 1999)
