= Chisela Kanchela =

Zambian swimmer

Personal information
- Full name: Chisela Kanchela
- National team: Zambia
- Born: 4 June 1987 (age 39) Ndola, Zambia
- Died: Dubai, United Arab Emirates
- Height: 1.80 m (5 ft 11 in)
- Weight: 70 kg (154 lb)

Sport
- Sport: Swimming
- Strokes: Breaststroke
- Club: City of Perth (AUS)
- College team: All Saints' College, Perth (AUS)

Chisela Kanchela (born 4 June 1987) was a Zambian swimmer, who specialized in breaststroke events. He currently holds numerous Zambian age group records in all breaststroke distances (50, 100, and 200 m), and is trained for the All Saints' College swimming team in Perth, Western Australia ever since he first appeared at the Olympics. Kanchela also competed at the Commonwealth Games in 2002 and 2006, but failed to reach the top 16 final.

Kanchela qualified for the men's 100 m breaststroke at the 2004 Summer Olympics in Athens, by receiving a Universality place from FINA in an entry time of 1:08.75. He participated in heat one against three other swimmers Eric Williams of Nigeria, Amar Shah of Kenya, and Alice Shrestha of Nepal. He raced to second place by a 2.26-second margin behind Williams in 1:09.95. Kanchela failed to advance into the semifinals, as he placed fifty-seventh overall out of 60 swimmers on the first day of preliminaries.

Kanchela worked as a swimming coach for the Olympic Youth Development Centre in Lusaka, an initiative which aims to develop over 2,000 underprivileged children to swim for a greater cause.
