= Valeriy Dymo =

Ukrainian swimmer (born 1985)

Medal record

Men's swimming

Representing Ukraine

European Championships (LC)
Silver medal – second place	2012 Debrecen	100 m breaststroke

European Championships (SC)
Silver medal – second place	2006 Helsinki	100 m breaststroke
Bronze medal – third place	2005 Trieste	100 m breaststroke

Summer Universiade
Gold medal – first place	2007 Bangkok	100 m breaststroke
Silver medal – second place	2005 Izmir	50 m breaststroke
Bronze medal – third place	2007 Bangkok	4×100 m medley

Military World Games
Bronze medal – third place	2015 Mungyeong	100 m breaststroke

European Junior Championships
Bronze medal – third place	2003 Glasgow	100 m breaststroke

Valeriy Dymo (Ukrainian: Валерій Володимирович Димо; born 9 September 1985 in Mykolaiv) is a Ukrainian swimmer who competed in the 2004 Summer Olympics, in the 2008 Summer Olympics and in the 2012 Summer Olympics.
