= Hugues Duboscq =

French swimmer (born 1981)

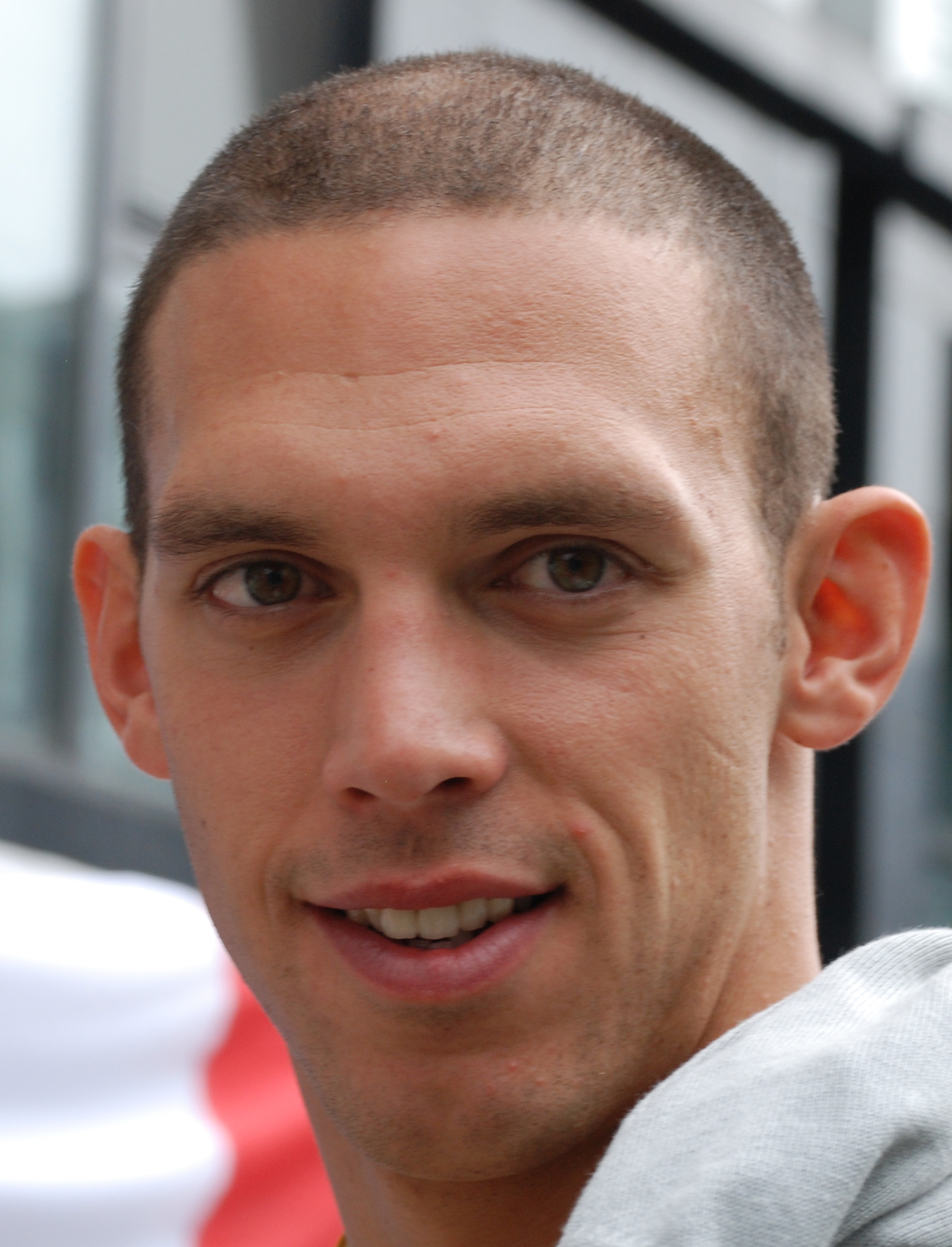
- 2008

Personal information
- Nationality: France
- Born: 29 August 1981 (age 45) Saint-Lô, Manche, France
- Height: 1.91 m (6 ft 3 in)
- Weight: 83 kg (183 lb)

Sport
- Sport: Swimming
- Strokes: Breaststroke
- Club: CN Le Havre
Medal record
Olympic Games
| Bronze medal – third place | 2004 Athens | 100m breaststroke |
| Bronze medal – third place | 2008 Beijing | 100m breaststroke |
| Bronze medal – third place | 2008 Beijing | 200m breaststroke |
World Championships
| Silver medal – second place | Rome 2009 | 100m breaststroke |
| Bronze medal – third place | Montreal 2005 | 100m breaststroke |
European Championships
| Gold medal – first place | 2010 Budapest | 4×100m Medley Relay |
| Silver medal – second place | 2002 Berlin | 4×100m Medley Relay |
| Silver medal – second place | 2004 Madrid | 50m breaststroke |
| Silver medal – second place | 2004 Madrid | 100m breaststroke |
| Silver medal – second place | 2004 Madrid | 4×100m Medley Relay |
| Silver medal – second place | 2008 Eindhoven | 100m breaststroke |
| Silver medal – second place | 2010 Budapest | 100m breaststroke |
| Bronze medal – third place | 2002 Berlin | 100m breaststroke |
| Bronze medal – third place | 2008 Eindhoven | 200m breaststroke |
| Bronze medal – third place | 2010 Budapest | 200m breaststroke |
SC Europeans
| Gold medal – first place | 2008 Rijeka | 200m breaststroke |
| Silver medal – second place | 2008 Rijeka | 100m breaststroke |
| Silver medal – second place | 2009 Istanbul | 4×50m Medley Relay |
Mediterranean Games
| Gold medal – first place | 2005 Almería | 100m breaststroke |
| Gold medal – first place | 2005 Almería | 200m breaststroke |

Hugues Duboscq (born 29 August 1981 in Saint-Lô, Manche, France) is an Olympic breaststroke swimmer from France. He swam for France at the 2000, 2004, 2008 Olympics and 2012 Olympics. He has won three Olympic bronze medals.

At the 2009 World Championships, he set the European Record in the men's 100 breaststroke (58.64).

== See also ==
- (in French) Hugues Duboscq on French Wikipedia
