= Glenn Snyders =

New Zealand swimmer

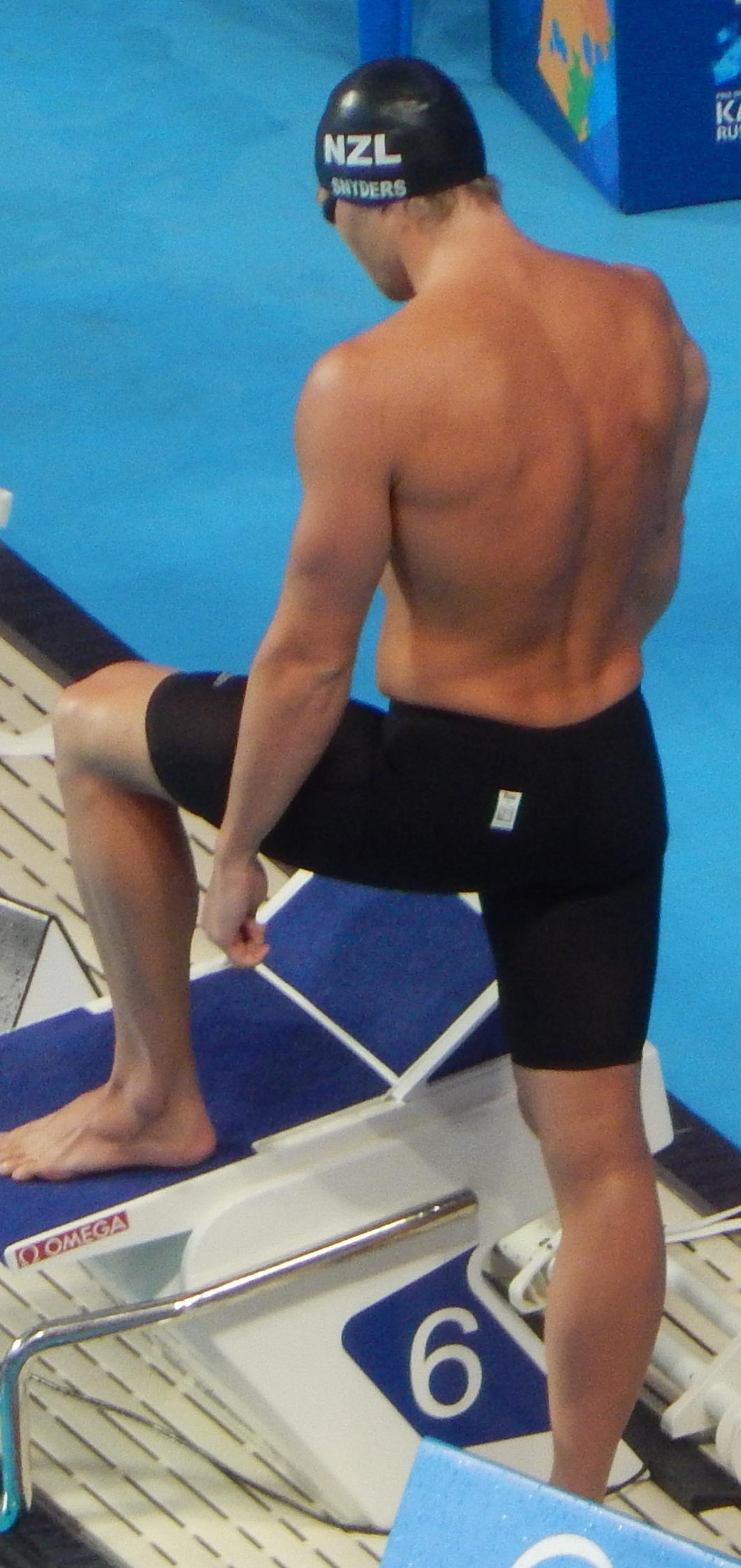
- Snyders in Kazan, Russia, 2015

Personal information
- Full name: Glenn Andrew Mark Snyders
- National team: New Zealand
- Born: 7 April 1987 (age 39) Klerksdorp, South Africa
- Height: 1.78 m (5 ft 10 in)
- Weight: 81 kg (179 lb)

Sport
- Sport: Swimming
- Strokes: Breaststroke
Medal record
Men's swimming
Representing New Zealand
Pan Pacific Championships
Bronze medal – third place	2014 Gold Coast	100 m breaststroke
Commonwealth Games
Silver medal – second place	2010 Delhi	50 m breaststroke
Summer Universiade
Gold medal – first place	2011 Shenzhen	50 m breaststroke
Gold medal – first place	2011 Shenzhen	200 m breaststroke
Silver medal – second place	2011 Shenzhen	100 m breaststroke
Bronze medal – third place	2011 Shenzhen	4 x 100 m medley relay

Glenn Andrew Mark Snyders (born 7 April 1987) is a South African-born former competitive swimmer for New Zealand. He won the silver medal in the 50 m breaststroke at the 2010 Commonwealth Games in a time of 27.67 seconds. He currently holds the New Zealand records for 50 m, 100 m and 200 m breaststroke in both long course and short course.

He also competed at the 2006 Commonwealth Games and the 2008 Summer Olympics. In the latter, he swam the breaststroke leg for the New Zealand team which finished fifth in the final of the Men's 4 × 100 metre medley relay. He also competed at the 2012 Summer Olympics in the 100 m and 200 m breaststroke and the 4 x 100 metre medley relay.

He moved from South Africa with his parents when he was twelve. He was the 2011 New Zealand Swimmer of the Year.

== Personal best times ==
As of 15 May 2022.

Short Course
Event	Time	Meet	Date	Note(s)	ref
50 m breaststroke	26.58	2014 New Zealand Short Course Swimming Championships	3 September 2014	NR	
100 m breaststroke	57.67	2014 New Zealand Short Course Swimming Championships	2 September 2014	NR	
200 m breaststroke	2:06.45	2008 New Zealand Summer Short Course Championships	13 December 2008	NR	

Long Course
Event	Time	Meet	Date	Note(s)	ref
50 m breaststroke	27.06	State 2012 New Zealand Open Championships	27 March 2012	NR	
100 m breaststroke	59.78	2012 Summer Olympics	28 July 2012	NR	
200 m breaststroke	2:10.55	2012 Summer Olympics	31 July 2012	NR	
