= Amar Shah =

Kenyan swimmer (born 1985)

Personal information
- Full name: Amar Shah
- National team: Kenya
- Born: 12 October 1985 (age 40)
- Height: 1.74 m (5 ft 9 in)
- Weight: 64 kg (141 lb)

Sport
- Sport: Swimming
- Strokes: Freestyle, breaststroke
- Club: Millfield School
- College team: University of Nottingham (GBR)
Medal record
Men's swimming
Representing Kenya
All-Africa Games
Bronze medal – third place	2011 Maputo	4×200 m freestyle
Bronze medal – third place	2011 Maputo	4×100 m medley

Amar Shah (born 12 October 1985) is a Kenyan former swimmer who specialized in breaststroke, but also competed in the freestyle relays. He is a single-time Olympian (2004), and a two-time swimmer at the Commonwealth Games (2006, and 2010). Shah qualified for the semifinals in 2010 Commonwealth Games setting a national record in the 50m breaststroke in a time of 30.53. He currently holds three long-course Kenyan records in the 50, 100 and 200 m breaststroke. Shah also won a total of bronze medals, as a member of the Kenyan swimming team, in the freestyle and medley relays (along with brothers David and Jason Dunford) at the 2011 All-Africa Games in Maputo, Mozambique.

Shah qualified for the men's 100 m breaststroke at the 2004 Summer Olympics in Athens, by receiving a Universality place from FINA in an entry time of 1:11.01. He participated in heat one against three other swimmers Eric Williams of Nigeria, Chisela Kanchela of Zambia, and Alice Shrestha of Nepal. He set a Kenyan record of 1:10.17 to earn a third spot by a 2.48-second margin behind winner Williams. Shah failed to advance into the semifinals, as he placed fifty-eighth overall out of 60 swimmers on the first day of preliminaries.
