= Jakob Jóhann Sveinsson =

Icelandic swimmer

Jakob Sveinsson
Personal information
- Full name: Jakob Jóhann Sveinsson
- Nationality: Iceland
- Born: 24 November 1982 (age 43) Reykjavík, Iceland
- Height: 1.86 m (6 ft 1 in)

Sport
- Sport: Swimming
- Strokes: Breaststroke
Medal record
Games of the Small States of Europe
Gold medal – first place	2003 Malta	200 m breaststroke
Gold medal – first place	2011 Liechtenstein	100 m breaststroke
Gold medal – first place	2011 Liechtenstein	4x100 m medley relay
Silver medal – second place	2003 Malta	100 m breaststroke

Jakob Jóhann Sveinsson (born 24 November 1982 in Reykjavík, Iceland) is a 4-time Olympic swimmer from Iceland who started swimming for S.C. Ægir in 1991. He swam for Iceland at the 2000, 2004, 2008 and 2012 Summer Olympics.

At the 2000 Olympics, he swam to Iceland's high-ever result in Olympic swimming in finishing 25th.

At the 2009 World Championships he swam to new national records in all 3 breaststroke events: 50 (28.03), 100 (1:01.31) and 200 (2:12.39).
