= Maxim Podoprigora =

Austrian swimmer

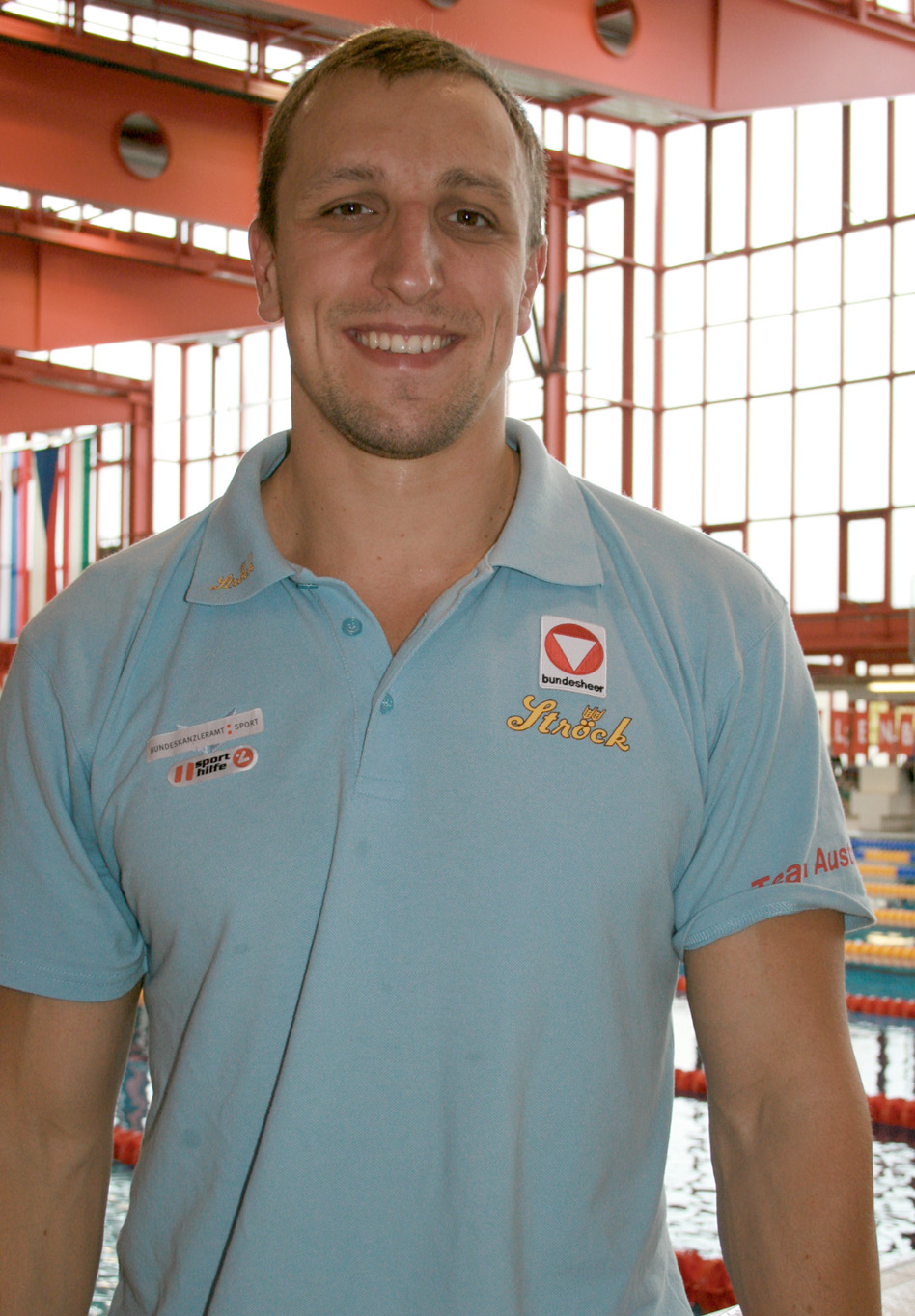

Personal information
- Nationality: Austria
- Born: April 18, 1978 (age 48) Kiev, Ukraine
- Height: 6 ft 1 in (185 cm)
- Weight: 187 lb (85 kg)

Sport
- Sport: Swimming
- Club: ASV Wien

Maxim Podoprigora (born April 18, 1978 in Kiev, Ukraine) is an Olympic breaststroke swimmer from Austria. He has swum for Austria at three Olympics (2000, 2004 and 2008) swimming the 200 breaststroke at all three and the 100 breaststroke in 2004.

He swims for Vienna Swim Club (ASV Wien) and studied at the University of Vienna. He serves in the Austrian Army.

His primary event is the 200 breaststroke. In 2001, he garnered a silver medal at the World Championships in the event, in an Austrian Record of 2:11.09. In 2000, he won a bronze medal at the European Championships in the 200 breaststroke. At the European Short Course Championships, he has won medals in the event in: 1998 (bronze), 2001 (gold), and 2002 (silver).

He is Jewish.
