= Dmitry Komornikov =

Russian swimmer

Personal information
- National team: Russia
- Born: 28 July 1981 (age 44)

Sport
- Sport: Swimming
- Strokes: Breaststroke
Medal record
Men's swimming
Representing Russia
European Championships (LC)
Gold medal – first place	2000 Helsinki	200 m breaststroke
Gold medal – first place	2000 Helsinki	4×100 m medley relay
Silver medal – second place	2004 Madrid	200 m breaststroke
Bronze medal – third place	2000 Helsinki	100 m breaststroke
World Championships (LC)
Silver medal – second place	2003 Barcelona	4x100m medley relay
Silver medal – second place	2005 Montreal	4x100m medley relay
Bronze medal – third place	2001 Fukuoka	4x100m medley relay
Bronze medal – third place	2007 Melbourne	4x100m medley relay
World Championships (SC)
Bronze medal – third place	1999 Hong Kong	200m breaststroke
Bronze medal – third place	2002 Moscow	4x100m medley relay

Dmitry Komornikov (born 28 July 1981) is a Russian swimmer who competed in the 2000 Summer Olympics, in the 2004 Summer Olympics, and in the 2008 Summer Olympics.

On 15 June 2003, Komornikov set the world record in the long course men's 200 breaststroke at the Mare Nostrum Barcelona meet, with a 2:09.52.

== See also ==
- World record progression 200 metres breaststroke

Records
Preceded by Kosuke Kitajima	Men's 200-meter breaststroke world record-holder (long course); 15 June 2003 – 24 July 2003	Succeeded by Kosuke Kitajima
