= Kevin Hensley (swimmer) =

U.S. Virgin Islands swimmer

Sport
- Sport: Swimming
- Strokes: Breaststroke

Kevin Hensley is a competitive swimmer from the United States Virgin Islands. He represented the Virgin Islands at the 2006 and 2010 Central American and Caribbean Games.
