= Mike Brown (swimmer) =

Canadian swimmer (born 1984)

Personal information
- Full name: Michael Andrew Brown
- Nickname: "Mike" Brownie
- National team: Canada
- Born: May 5, 1984 (age 42) Perth, Ontario
- Height: 1.85 m (6 ft 1 in)
- Weight: 87 kg (192 lb)

Sport
- Sport: Swimming
- Strokes: Breaststroke
- Club: Perth Stingrays Aquatic Club
- College team: University of Calgary; University of Windsor
Medal record
Men's swimming
Representing Canada
World Championships (LC)
Silver medal – second place	2005 Montreal	200 m breaststroke
Pan Pacific Championships
Bronze medal – third place	2002 Yokohama	4×100 m medley
Commonwealth Games
Gold medal – first place	2006 Melbourne	200 m breaststroke
Bronze medal – third place	2002 Manchester	200 m breaststroke

Michael Andrew Brown (born May 5, 1984) is a Canadian former competitive swimmer. He started swimming at age seven and was a student at the University of Calgary. Brown's dream was to become an olympian for Canada and it became true when he qualified for the 2004 Summer Olympics in Athens, Greece. He broke the 200-meter breaststroke Canadian record and placed 6th.

His best finish at a world championships was at the 2005 championships in Montreal, when he finished 2nd in the 200-metre breaststroke. Brown won gold at the 2006 Commonwealth Games in Melbourne, Australia, beating his opponent by 0.01 of a second. He was born in Perth, Ontario.

Brown competed at the 2008 Summer Olympics in the 100-metre breaststroke and 200-metre breaststroke. He finished 20th in the 100-metre heats with a time of 1:00.98 and 4th in the 200-metre final with a Canadian Record 2:08.84.

After serving his country for eight years in the national team, Brown announced his retirement in 2009 but it didn't seem long lasting and he was seen back in the pools by 2010, fueled and determined for 2012 Summer Olympics.

== See also ==
- List of Canadian records in swimming
- List of Commonwealth Games medallists in swimming (men)
- List of Commonwealth Games records in swimming
