= Swimming at the 2006 Asian Games – Men's 100 metre breaststroke =

Men's 100 metre breaststroke at the 2006 Asian Games
- Venue: Hamad Aquatic Centre
- Date: 4 December 2006
- Competitors: 34 from 25 nations

Medalists
gold medal	Kosuke Kitajima	Japan
silver medal	Makoto Yamashita	Japan
bronze medal	Vladislav Polyakov	Kazakhstan

The men's 100m breaststroke swimming event at the 2006 Asian Games was held on December 4, 2006 at the Hamad Aquatic Centre in Doha, Qatar.

== Schedule ==
All times are Arabia Standard Time (UTC+03:00)

Date	Time	Event
Monday, 4 December 2006	10:37	Heats
Monday, 4 December 2006	18:37	Final

== Records ==
Prior to this competition, the existing world, Asian and Games records were as follows.

World Record	Brendan Hansen (USA)	59.13	Irvine, United States	1 August 2006
Asian Record	Kosuke Kitajima (JPN)	59.53	Montreal, Canada	25 July 2005
Games Record	Kosuke Kitajima (JPN)	1:00.45	Busan, South Korea	30 September 2002

== Results ==
Legend

- DNS — Did not start
- DSQ — Disqualified

=== Heats ===
Rank	Heat	Athlete	Time	Notes
1	5	Kosuke Kitajima (JPN)	1:01.48	
2	3	Makoto Yamashita (JPN)	1:02.08	
3	4	Vladislav Polyakov (KAZ)	1:03.20	
4	5	Xie Zhi (CHN)	1:03.36	
5	5	You Seung-hun (KOR)	1:04.04	
6	1	Yevgeniy Ryzhkov (KAZ)	1:04.05	
7	5	Vorrawuti Aumpiwan (THA)	1:04.07	
8	4	Lai Zhongjian (CHN)	1:04.46	
9	3	Chiang Hsin-hung (TPE)	1:04.77	
10	4	Shin Su-jong (KOR)	1:04.87	
11	4	Nguyễn Hữu Việt (VIE)	1:04.90	
12	3	Mohammad Alirezaei (IRI)	1:05.04	
13	5	Ahmed Al-Kudmani (KSA)	1:05.27	
14	3	Wang Wei-wen (TPE)	1:05.28	
15	3	Leonard Tan (SIN)	1:05.43	
16	5	Gerard Bordado (PHI)	1:05.47	
17	4	Andrey Morkovin (UZB)	1:05.94	
18	4	Abdulrahman Al-Bader (KUW)	1:06.36	
19	5	Wael Koubrousli (LIB)	1:07.18	
20	4	Eric Chan (HKG)	1:07.78	
21	4	Ma Chan Wai (MAC)	1:08.03	
22	3	Firas Chihade (SYR)	1:08.04	
23	3	Humoud Al-Humoud (KUW)	1:08.08	
24	2	Osama El-Aarag (QAT)	1:08.13	
25	2	Mubarak Mohamed Al-Besher (UAE)	1:09.52	
26	2	Lao Hei Meng (MAC)	1:10.53	
27	2	Shajahan Ali (BAN)	1:10.92	
28	5	Pavel Kuleshov (KGZ)	1:11.73	
29	2	Boldbaataryn Bütekh-Üils (MGL)	1:13.09	
30	2	Wasseim Surey (PLE)	1:15.12	
31	1	Hassan Ashraf (MDV)	1:17.94	
32	2	Guwanç Ataniýazow (TKM)	1:19.81	
—	1	Ahmed Al-Demery (PLE)	DSQ	
—	3	Yousuf Al-Yousuf (KSA)	DNS	

=== Final ===
Rank	Athlete	Time	Notes
1st place, gold medalist(s)	Kosuke Kitajima (JPN)	1:01.13	
2nd place, silver medalist(s)	Makoto Yamashita (JPN)	1:01.50	
3rd place, bronze medalist(s)	Vladislav Polyakov (KAZ)	1:01.63	
4	Yevgeniy Ryzhkov (KAZ)	1:02.79	
5	Lai Zhongjian (CHN)	1:03.06	
6	Xie Zhi (CHN)	1:03.16	
7	You Seung-hun (KOR)	1:03.46	
8	Vorrawuti Aumpiwan (THA)	1:04.53	
