= Swimming at the 2006 Asian Games – Men's 200 metre breaststroke =

Men's 200 metre breaststroke at the 2006 Asian Games
- Venue: Hamad Aquatic Centre
- Date: 7 December 2006
- Competitors: 26 from 18 nations

Medalists
gold medal	Kosuke Kitajima	Japan
silver medal	Daisuke Kimura	Japan
bronze medal	Vladislav Polyakov	Kazakhstan

The men's 200m breaststroke swimming event at the 2006 Asian Games was held on December 7, 2006 at the Hamad Aquatic Centre in Doha, Qatar.

== Schedule ==
All times are Arabia Standard Time (UTC+03:00)

Date	Time	Event
Thursday, 7 December 2006	10:23	Heats
Thursday, 7 December 2006	18:11	Final

== Records ==
Prior to this competition, the existing world, Asian and Games records were as follows.

World Record	Brendan Hansen (USA)	2:08.50	Victoria, Canada	21 August 2006
Asian Record	Kosuke Kitajima (JPN)	2:09.42	Barcelona, Spain	24 July 2003
Games Record	Kosuke Kitajima (JPN)	2:09.97	Busan, South Korea	2 October 2002

== Results ==
Legend

- DNS — Did not start

=== Heats ===
Rank	Heat	Athlete	Time	Notes
1	4	Kosuke Kitajima (JPN)	2:15.57	
2	2	Daisuke Kimura (JPN)	2:16.57	
3	2	Shin Su-jong (KOR)	2:16.78	
4	4	Wang Wei-wen (TPE)	2:17.81	
5	4	Lai Zhongjian (CHN)	2:18.02	
6	3	Vladislav Polyakov (KAZ)	2:18.36	
7	3	Xie Zhi (CHN)	2:18.44	
8	2	Miguel Molina (PHI)	2:19.38	
9	3	Chiang Hsin-hung (TPE)	2:19.49	
10	1	Yevgeniy Ryzhkov (KAZ)	2:20.72	
11	3	Andrey Morkovin (UZB)	2:21.03	
12	4	Vorrawuti Aumpiwan (THA)	2:21.39	
13	4	Leonard Tan (SIN)	2:22.48	
14	3	Gerard Bordado (PHI)	2:23.96	
15	2	Nguyễn Hữu Việt (VIE)	2:25.95	
16	4	Abdulrahman Al-Bader (KUW)	2:27.90	
17	2	Lim Zhi Cong (SIN)	2:28.89	
18	3	You Seung-hun (KOR)	2:29.15	
19	3	Osama El-Aarag (QAT)	2:31.19	
20	3	Wael Koubrousli (LIB)	2:33.35	
21	2	Firas Chihade (SYR)	2:33.41	
22	4	Lao Hei Meng (MAC)	2:34.10	
23	2	Pavel Kuleshov (KGZ)	2:38.38	
24	4	Ma Chan Wai (MAC)	2:46.43	
25	1	Hassan Ashraf (MDV)	2:54.69	
—	1	Guwanç Ataniýazow (TKM)	DNS	

=== Final ===
Rank	Athlete	Time	Notes
1st place, gold medalist(s)	Kosuke Kitajima (JPN)	2:12.05	
2nd place, silver medalist(s)	Daisuke Kimura (JPN)	2:13.17	
3rd place, bronze medalist(s)	Vladislav Polyakov (KAZ)	2:13.60	
4	Lai Zhongjian (CHN)	2:14.95	
5	Xie Zhi (CHN)	2:15.11	
6	Shin Su-jong (KOR)	2:15.90	
7	Miguel Molina (PHI)	2:17.89	
8	Wang Wei-wen (TPE)	2:17.95	
