= Swimming at the 2006 Asian Games – Men's 50 metre breaststroke =

Men's 50 metre breaststroke at the 2006 Asian Games
- Venue: Hamad Aquatic Centre
- Date: 3 December 2006
- Competitors: 35 from 23 nations

Medalists
gold medal	Vladislav Polyakov	Kazakhstan
silver medal	Kosuke Kitajima	Japan
bronze medal	Wang Haibo	China

The men's 50m breaststroke swimming event at the 2006 Asian Games was held on December 3, 2006, at the Hamad Aquatic Centre in Doha, Qatar.

== Schedule ==
All times are Arabia Standard Time (UTC+03:00)

Date	Time	Event
Sunday, 3 December 2006	10:57	Heats
Sunday, 3 December 2006	18:46	Final

== Records ==
Prior to this competition, the existing world, Asian and Games records were as follows.

World Record	Oleh Lisohor (UKR)	27.18	Berlin, Germany	2 August 2002
Asian Record	Kosuke Kitajima (JPN)	27.99	Tokyo, Japan	3 April 2003
Games Record	Kosuke Kitajima (JPN)	28.87	Busan, South Korea	30 September 2002

== Results ==
Legend

- DNS — Did not start
- DSQ — Disqualified

=== Heats ===
Rank	Heat	Athlete	Time	Notes
1	4	Vladislav Polyakov (KAZ)	28.42	GR
2	5	Kosuke Kitajima (JPN)	28.56	
3	3	Hiromasa Sakimoto (JPN)	28.76	
4	3	Qu Jingyu (CHN)	28.80	
5	4	Ahmed Al-Kudmani (KSA)	29.04	
6	1	Yevgeniy Ryzhkov (KAZ)	29.30	
7	5	Chiang Hsin-hung (TPE)	29.34	
8	4	Wang Haibo (CHN)	29.36	
9	3	Miguel Molina (PHI)	29.44	
10	4	You Seung-hun (KOR)	29.46	
11	4	Vorrawuti Aumpiwan (THA)	29.61	
12	5	Mohammad Alirezaei (IRI)	29.65	
13	5	Ma Chan Wai (MAC)	30.03	
14	4	Gerard Bordado (PHI)	30.15	
15	3	Wael Koubrousli (LIB)	30.16	
16	5	Leonard Tan (SIN)	30.17	
17	3	Nguyễn Hữu Việt (VIE)	30.20	
18	5	Wang Wei-wen (TPE)	30.55	
19	2	Gary Tan (SIN)	30.65	
20	4	Shin Su-jong (KOR)	30.66	
21	2	Osama El-Aarag (QAT)	30.85	
22	3	Humoud Al-Humoud (KUW)	30.97	
23	5	Firas Chihade (SYR)	31.14	
24	3	Shajahan Ali (BAN)	31.18	
25	2	Mubarak Mohamed Al-Besher (UAE)	31.91	
26	5	Pavel Kuleshov (KGZ)	32.27	
27	4	Lao Hei Meng (MAC)	32.30	
28	2	Boldbaataryn Bütekh-Üils (MGL)	32.34	
29	2	Wasseim Surey (PLE)	33.32	
30	1	Ahmed Al-Demery (PLE)	34.11	
31	2	Hassan Ashraf (MDV)	34.52	
32	2	Guwanç Ataniýazow (TKM)	35.35	
33	1	Buyankhishigiin Bilgüitei (MGL)	39.64	
—	3	Denis Ryskal (KGZ)	DSQ	
—	2	Yousuf Al-Yousuf (KSA)	DNS	

=== Final ===
Rank	Athlete	Time	Notes
1st place, gold medalist(s)	Vladislav Polyakov (KAZ)	28.29	GR
2nd place, silver medalist(s)	Kosuke Kitajima (JPN)	28.38	
3rd place, bronze medalist(s)	Wang Haibo (CHN)	28.41	
4	Hiromasa Sakimoto (JPN)	28.43	
5	Yevgeniy Ryzhkov (KAZ)	28.97	
6	Ahmed Al-Kudmani (KSA)	29.20	
7	Qu Jingyu (CHN)	29.21	
8	Chiang Hsin-hung (TPE)	29.64	
