= 2010 FINA World Swimming Championships (25 m) – Men's 200 metre breaststroke =

Men's 200m Breaststroke at the 2010 Short Course Worlds
- Dates: 17 December 2010
- Competitors: 57
- Winning time: 2:03.12

Medalists
gold medal	Naoya Tomita	Japan
silver medal	Dániel Gyurta	Hungary
bronze medal	Brenton Rickard	Australia

The Men's 200 Breaststroke at the 10th FINA World Swimming Championships (25m) was swum 17 December. 57 individuals swam in the Preliminary heats in the morning, with the top-8 finishers advancing to the Final in the evening.

At the start of the event, the existing World (WR) and Championship records (CR) were:

	Name	Nation	Time	Location	Date
WR	Dániel Gyurta	Hungary	2:00.67	Istanbul	13 December 2009
CR	Brendan Hansen	United States	2:04.98	Indianapolis	9 October 2004

The following records were established during the competition:

Date	Round	Name	Nation	Time	WR	CR
17 December 2010	Heats	Dániel Gyurta	Hungary	2:04.46		CR
17 December 2010	Final	Naoya Tomita	Japan	2:03.12		CR

== Results ==
=== Heats ===
Rank	Heat	Lane	Name	Time	Notes
1	8	4	Dániel Gyurta (HUN)	2:04.46	Q, CR
2	7	4	Naoya Tomita (JPN)	2:04.93	Q
3	7	5	Marco Koch (GER)	2:05.00	Q
4	7	2	Neil Versfeld (RSA)	2:05.14	Q
5	6	4	Grigory Falko (RUS)	2:05.80	Q
6	8	3	Eric Shanteau (USA)	2:05.84	Q
7	6	6	Brenton Rickard (AUS)	2:06.00	Q
8	6	1	Hugues Duboscq (FRA)	2:06.36	Q
9	7	3	Tales Cerdeira (BRA)	2:06.39	
10	6	5	Vladislav Polyakov (KAZ)	2:06.78	
11	8	2	Laurent Carnol (LUX)	2:07.10	
12	6	7	Adam Klein (USA)	2:07.25	
13	8	8	Lennart Stekelenburg (NED)	2:07.38	
14	8	1	Igor Borysik (UKR)	2:07.62	
15	5	7	Warren Barnes (CAN)	2:07.89	
16	8	5	Edoardo Giorgetti (ITA)	2:08.01	
17	6	8	Giedrius Titenis (LTU)	2:08.03	
18	5	4	Paul Kornfeld (CAN)	2:08.35	
19	6	2	Martti Aljand (EST)	2:08.96	
20	7	8	William Grant Diering (RSA)	2:09.15	
20	8	6	Viatcheslav Sinkevich (RUS)	2:09.15	
22	8	7	Sławomir Kuczko (POL)	2:09.25	
23	7	1	Tomáš Klobučník (SVK)	2:09.36	
24	7	6	Christian Sprenger (AUS)	2:09.52	
25	7	7	Yevgeniy Ryzhkov (KAZ)	2:09.94	
26	6	3	Felipe Silva (BRA)	2:10.71	
27	5	6	Jakob Jóhann Sveinsson (ISL)	2:10.92	
28	4	5	Jorge Murillo (COL)	2:11.49	
29	5	1	Sofiane Daid (ALG)	2:12.39	
30	4	6	Édgar Crespo (PAN)	2:12.63	
31	5	5	Wang Shuai (CHN)	2:13.71	
32	4	3	Juan Alberto Guerra Quiñonez (ESA)	2:14.26	
32	5	3	David Olivier Mercado (MEX)	2:14.26	
34	4	4	Dmitrii Aleksandrov (KGZ)	2:14.39	
35	2	5	Timothy Ferris (ZIM)	2:14.68	
36	5	2	Malick Fall (SEN)	2:15.98	
37	4	8	Hocine Haciane (AND)	2:16.28	
38	5	8	Chen Cho-Yi (TPE)	2:20.57	
39	3	3	Andrea Agius (MLT)	2:20.93	
40	4	7	Lim Duan Le Kenneth (SIN)	2:21.34	
41	3	5	Maximilian Siedentopf (NAM)	2:21.54	
41	4	2	Wael Koubrousli (LIB)	2:21.54	
43	3	7	Mubarak Al-Besher (UAE)	2:22.33	
44	2	6	Jourdy Martis (AHO)	2:22.45	
45	3	6	Martin Melconian (URU)	2:22.48	
46	3	2	Arturo Alejandro Montilla (DOM)	2:23.54	
47	3	4	Damir Davletbaev (KGZ)	2:23.87	
48	3	8	Jehaad Alhenidi (JOR)	2:27.29	
49	2	4	Daniel Galea (MLT)	2:30.69	
50	1	5	Nazih Mezayek (JOR)	2:30.86	
51	2	3	Hemra Nurmuradov (TKM)	2:37.76	
52	2	2	Ronaldo Rodrigues (GUY)	2:40.83	
53	1	4	Mamadou Fofana (MLI)	2:51.27	
54	2	7	Ron Albert Roucou (SEY)	2:52.78	
–	1	3	Xue Ruipeng (CHN)	DNS	
–	3	1	Mohamed Jasim (UAE)	DSQ	
–	4	1	Leopoldo Andara (VEN)	DSQ	

=== Final ===
Rank	Lane	Name	Time	Notes
1st place, gold medalist(s)	5	Naoya Tomita (JPN)	2:03.12	CR
2nd place, silver medalist(s)	4	Dániel Gyurta (HUN)	2:03.47	
3rd place, bronze medalist(s)	1	Brenton Rickard (AUS)	2:04.33	
4	3	Marco Koch (GER)	2:05.15	
4	6	Neil Versfeld (RSA)	2:05.15	
6	2	Grigory Falko (RUS)	2:05.28	
7	8	Hugues Duboscq (FRA)	2:05.68	
8	7	Eric Shanteau (USA)	2:05.86	
