= Swimming at the 2009 World Aquatics Championships – Men's 200 metre breaststroke =

Men's 200 metre breaststroke at the 2009 FINA World Championships
- Venue: Foro Italico
- Dates: 30 July 2009 (heats, semifinals); 31 July 2009 (final)
- Competitors: 84
- Winning time: 2:07.64

Medalists
gold medal	Dániel Gyurta	Hungary
silver medal	Eric Shanteau	United States
bronze medal	Giedrius Titenis	Lithuania
bronze medal	Christian Sprenger	Australia

The heats for the men's 200 metre breaststroke race at the 2009 World Championships took place in the morning and evening of 30 July, with the final in the evening session of 31 July at the Foro Italico in Rome, Italy.

== Records ==
Prior to this competition, the existing world and competition records were as follows:

World record	Kosuke Kitajima (JPN)	2:07.51	Tokyo, Japan	8 June 2008
Championship record	Kosuke Kitajima (JPN)	2:09.42	Barcelona, Spain	24 July 2003

The following records were established during the competition:

Date	Round	Name	Nationality	Time	Record
30 July	Heat 5	Giedrius Titenis	Lithuania	2:09.28	CR
30 July	Heat 6	Yevgeniy Ryzhkov	Kazakhstan	2:09.26	CR
30 July	Heat 7	Henrique Barbosa	Brazil	2:09.22	CR
30 July	Heat 8	Loris Facci	Italy	2:08.85	CR
30 July	Heat 9	Eric Shanteau	United States	2:08.55	CR
30 July	Semifinal 1	Christian Sprenger	Australia	2:07.31	WR

== Results ==
=== Heats ===
Rank	Name	Nationality	Time	Heat	Lane	Notes
1	Eric Shanteau	United States	2:08.55	9	4	CR
2	Dániel Gyurta	Hungary	2:08.71	9	5	
3	Loris Facci	Italy	2:08.85	8	3	NR
4	Marco Koch	Germany	2:09.06	8	4	
5	Henrique Barbosa	Brazil	2:09.22	7	4	
6	Yevgeniy Ryzhkov	Kazakhstan	2:09.26	6	4	
7	Giedrius Titenis	Lithuania	2:09.28	5	8	
8	Edoardo Giorgetti	Italy	2:09.29	8	7	
9	Kristopher Gilchrist	Great Britain	2:09.31	7	2	NR
10	Yuta Suenaga	Japan	2:09.33	8	5	
11	Hugues Duboscq	France	2:09.45	9	3	
12	Christian Sprenger	Australia	2:09.82	7	8	
13	Neil Versfeld	South Africa	2:09.86	9	2	AF
14	Grigory Falko	Russia	2:10.23	7	9	
15	Igor Borysik	Ukraine	2:10.39	7	7	
16	Brenton Rickard	Australia	2:10.54	7	5	
17	Naoya Tomita	Japan	2:10.85	9	6	
18	Vladislav Polyakov	Kazakhstan	2:11.09	8	1	
19	Maxim Podoprigora	Austria	2:11.17	6	5	
20	Chris Christensen	Denmark	2:11.41	6	2	NR
21	Richard Webb	Great Britain	2:11.78	9	1	
22	Paul Kornfeld	Canada	2:11.87	8	9	
23	Valerii Dymo	Ukraine	2:12.08	6	6	
24	Johannes Neumann	Germany	2:12.12	7	6	
25	Jakob Jóhann Sveinsson	Iceland	2:12.39	5	4	NR
26	Scott Dickens	Canada	2:12.57	8	8	
27	Tales Cerdeira	Brazil	2:12.62	7	3	
28	Istvan Mate	Austria	2:12.64	9	9	
29	William Diering	South Africa	2:12.84	8	2	
30	Andrew Bree	Ireland	2:12.90	5	5	
31	Laurent Carnol	Luxembourg	2:13.00	6	7	
32	Sandeep Sejwal	India	2:13.22	6	0	
33	Alejandro Jacobo	Mexico	2:13.37	6	9	NR
34	Slawomir Wolniak	Poland	2:13.83	7	1	
35	Tomáš Klobučník	Slovakia	2:14.33	5	2	
36	Tom Be'eri	Israel	2:14.59	9	0	
37	Sławomir Kuczko	Poland	2:14.74	8	0	
38	Malick Fall	Senegal	2:15.00	5	1	
39	Hocine Haciane	Andorra	2:15.37	6	1	
40	Gal Nevo	Israel	2:15.49	4	3	
41	Carlos Almeida	Portugal	2:15.58	6	3	
42	Joshua Arreguin	Mexico	2:16.57	5	7	
43	Nguyen Huu Viet	Vietnam	2:16.85	4	5	
44	Zhang Guoying	China	2:17.07	6	8	
45	Eetu Karvonen	Finland	2:18.61	5	9	
46	Wang Wei-Wen	Chinese Taipei	2:19.55	4	4	
47	Dmitriy Shvetsov	Uzbekistan	2:20.14	3	1	
48	Jorge Murillo	Colombia	2:20.53	5	3	
49	Dmitrii Aleksandrov	Kyrgyzstan	2:20.65	4	7	
50	Wang Shuai	China	2:20.78	5	6	
51	Indra Gunawan	Indonesia	2:20.81	4	9	
52	Tan Jinwen Mark	Singapore	2:21.42	4	6	
53	Wael Koubrousli	Lebanon	2:21.65	4	8	
54	Daniel Velez	Puerto Rico	2:22.19	3	8	
55	Matthew Charles Smith	Estonia	2:22.20	2	3	
56	Benjamin Guzman Blanco	Chile	2:22.25	4	1	
57	Ivan Demyanenko	Uzbekistan	2:23.95	3	3	
58	Édgar Crespo	Panama	2:24.08	4	0	
59	Agnishwar Jayaprakash	India	2:24.49	3	2	
60	Maximilian Siedentopf	Namibia	2:24.70	2	4	
61	Ng Jia Hao	Singapore	2:25.77	3	6	
62	Abdulrahman Albader	Kuwait	2:26.18	4	2	
63	Juan Guerra	El Salvador	2:26.19	3	4	
64	Eli Ebenezer Wong	Northern Mariana Islands	2:26.83	3	9	
65	Mubarak Al-Besher	United Arab Emirates	2:28.36	2	2	
66	Renato Prono Fernandez	Paraguay	2:30.13	5	0	
67	Rainui Teriipaia	Tahiti	2:30.75	3	7	
68	Pedro Luna Llamosas	Peru	2:31.76	3	0	
69	Diguan Pigot	Suriname	2:32.15	2	6	
70	Rafael Alfaro	El Salvador	2:32.74	2	5	
71	Timur Kartabaev	Kyrgyzstan	2:33.69	3	5	
72	Andrea Agius	Malta	2:35.06	2	1	
73	Hemra Nurmyradov	Turkmenistan	2:36.00	2	0	
74	Vincent Perry	Tahiti	2:37.18	2	7	
75	Kevin Cheung	Mauritius	2:38.31	1	5	
76	Ian Bond Wolongkatop Nakmai	Papua New Guinea	2:39.41	1	4	
77	Pablo Navarrete	Nicaragua	2:40.57	2	8	
78	Serdar Mopyyev	Turkmenistan	2:48.47	1	3	
79	Hussain Mubah	Maldives	3:10.54	1	6	
–	Nazih Mezayek	Jordan	DSQ	2	9	
–	Romanos Alyfantis	Greece	DSQ	7	0	
–	Melquiades Alvarez	Spain	DSQ	8	6	
–	Adam Klein	United States	DSQ	9	7	
–	Glenn Snyders	New Zealand	DSQ	9	8	

=== Semifinals ===
Rank	Name	Nationality	Time	Heat	Lane	Notes
1	Christian Sprenger	Australia	2:07.31	1	7	WR
2	Eric Shanteau	United States	2:07.42	2	4	AM
3	Brenton Rickard	Australia	2:07.89	1	8	
4	Dániel Gyurta	Hungary	2:08.08	1	4	ER
5	Giedrius Titenis	Lithuania	2:08.35	2	6	
6	Loris Facci	Italy	2:08.50	2	5	NR
7	Henrique Barbosa	Brazil	2:08.56	2	3	
8	Edoardo Giorgetti	Italy	2:08.63	1	6	
9	Hugues Duboscq	France	2:09.00	2	7	
10	Kristopher Gilchrist	Great Britain	2:09.01	2	2	NR
11	Grigory Falko	Russia	2:09.36	1	1	NR
12	Marco Koch	Germany	2:09.44	1	5	
13	Neil Versfeld	South Africa	2:09.61	2	1	AF
14	Yuta Suenaga	Japan	2:09.70	1	2	
15	Yevgeniy Ryzhkov	Kazakhstan	2:10.15	1	3	
16	Igor Borysik	Ukraine	2:10.82	2	8	

=== Final ===
Rank	Name	Nationality	Time	Lane	Notes
1st place, gold medalist(s)	Dániel Gyurta	Hungary	2:07.64	6	ER
2nd place, silver medalist(s)	Eric Shanteau	United States	2:07.65	5	
3rd place, bronze medalist(s)	Giedrius Titenis	Lithuania	2:07.80	2	NR
3rd place, bronze medalist(s)	Christian Sprenger	Australia	2:07.80	4	
5	Brenton Rickard	Australia	2:08.23	3	
6	Edoardo Giorgetti	Italy	2:08.86	8	
7	Henrique Barbosa	Brazil	2:09.35	1	
8	Loris Facci	Italy	2:10.26	7	
