= 2010 Pan Pacific Swimming Championships – Men's 100 metre breaststroke =

Men's 100 metre breaststroke at the 2010 Pan Pacific Swimming Championships
- Venue: William Woollett Jr. Aquatics Center
- Dates: August 19, 2010 (heats & finals)
- Competitors: 28 from 10 nations
- Winning time: 59.35

Medalists
gold medal	Kosuke Kitajima	Japan
silver medal	Christian Sprenger	Australia
bronze medal	Mark Gangloff	United States

The men's 100 metre breaststroke competition at the 2010 Pan Pacific Swimming Championships took place on August 19 at the William Woollett Jr. Aquatics Center. The last champion was Brendan Hansen of US.

This race consisted of two lengths of the pool, both lengths being in breaststroke.

== Records ==
Prior to this competition, the existing world and Pan Pacific records were as follows:

World record	Brenton Rickard (AUS)	58.58	Rome, Italy	July 27, 2009
Pan Pacific Championships record	Brendan Hansen (USA)	59.90	Victoria, Canada	August 18, 2006

== Results ==
All times are in minutes and seconds.

KEY:	q	Fastest non-qualifiers	Q	Qualified	CR	Championships record	NR	National record	PB	Personal best	SB	Seasonal best

=== Heats ===
The first round was held on August 19, at 10:44.

Rank	Heat	Lane	Name	Nationality	Time	Notes
1	3	5	Kosuke Kitajima	Japan	59.04	QA, CR
2	4	5	Ryo Tateishi	Japan	1:00.09	QA
3	4	6	Mark Gangloff	United States	1:00.21	QA
4	3	6	Eric Shanteau	United States	1:00.31	QA
5	3	2	Tales Cerdeira	Brazil	1:00.47	QA
6	3	3	Yuta Suenaga	Japan	1:00.80	QA
7	2	4	Christian Sprenger	Australia	1:00.83	QA
8	4	7	Felipe Lima	Brazil	1:00.88	QA
9	2	5	Michael Alexandrov	United States	1:00.89	QB
9	4	4	Brenton Rickard	Australia	1:00.89	QB
11	4	3	João Luiz Gomes Júnior	Brazil	1:01.02	QB
12	2	1	Scott Dickens	Canada	1:01.03	QB
13	4	1	Scott Spann	United States	1:01.12	QB
14	3	4	Henrique Barbosa	Brazil	1:01.17	QB
15	3	7	Glenn Snyders	New Zealand	1:01.19	QB
16	2	3	Felipe França	Brazil	1:01.39	QB
17	2	2	Naoya Tomita	Japan	1:01.90	
18	2	6	Eduardo Fischer	Brazil	1:01.98	
19	3	1	Warren Barnes	Canada	1:02.18	
20	4	8	Craig Calder	Australia	1:02.48	
21	2	8	Elliot Keefer	United States	1:02.60	
22	3	8	Paul Kornfeld	Canada	1:02.63	
23	4	2	Choi Kyu-Woong	South Korea	1:02.77	
24	1	4	Sean Nugent	Canada	1:03.01	
25	1	6	Miguel Molina	Philippines	1:03.89	
26	1	5	Wong Chun Yan	Hong Kong	1:04.04	
27	1	2	Timothy Ferris	Zimbabwe	1:05.45	
28	1	3	Tsui Hoi Tung	Hong Kong	1:05.85	
-	2	7	Neil Versfeld	South Africa	DNS	

=== B Final ===
The B final was held on August 19, at 18:43.

Rank	Lane	Name	Nationality	Time	Notes
9	5	Michael Alexandrov	United States	1:00.58	
10	2	Glenn Snyders	New Zealand	1:00.74	
11	6	Scott Dickens	Canada	1:00.79	
12	7	Warren Barnes	Canada	1:02.13	
13	3	João Luiz Gomes Júnior	Brazil	1:02.33	
14	1	Craig Calder	Australia	1:02.66	
15	8	Choi Kyu-Woong	South Korea	1:03.10	
-	4	Yuta Suenaga	Japan	DSQ	

=== A Final ===
The A final was held on August 19, at 18:43.

Rank	Lane	Name	Nationality	Time	Notes
1st place, gold medalist(s)	4	Kosuke Kitajima	Japan	59.35	
2nd place, silver medalist(s)	7	Christian Sprenger	Australia	1:00.18	
3rd place, bronze medalist(s)	3	Mark Gangloff	United States	1:00.24	
4	5	Ryo Tateishi	Japan	1:00.26	
5	8	Brenton Rickard	Australia	1:00.28	
6	6	Eric Shanteau	United States	1:00.55	
7	2	Tales Cerdeira	Brazil	1:00.63	
8	1	Felipe Lima	Brazil	1:00.90	
