= 2010 FINA World Swimming Championships (25 m) – Men's 50 metre breaststroke =

Men's 50m Breaststroke at the 2010 Short Course Worlds
- Dates: 18 December 2010 (heats and semifinals); 19 December 2010 (final)
- Competitors: 92
- Winning time: 25.95

Medalists
gold medal	Felipe França Silva	Brazil
silver medal	Cameron van der Burgh	South Africa
bronze medal	Aleksander Hetland	Norway

The Men's 50 Breaststroke at the 10th FINA World Swimming Championships (25m) was swum 18 – 19 December in Dubai, United Arab Emirates. 92 individuals swam in the Preliminary heats on 18 December, with the top 16 finishers advancing to the Semifinals that evening. The top 8 finishers from the Semifinals then advanced to the Final the next evening.

At the start of the event, the existing World (WR) and Championship records (CR) were:

	Name	Nation	Time	Location	Date
WR	Cameron van der Burgh	South Africa	25.25	Berlin	14 November 2009
CR	Oleg Lisogor	Ukraine	26.39	Shanghai	9 April 2006

The following records were established during the competition:

Date	Round	Name	Nation	Time	WR	CR
18 December 2010	Heats	Cameron van der Burgh	South Africa	26.14		CR
19 December 2010	Final	Felipe França Silva	Brazil	25.95		CR

== Results ==
=== Heats ===
Rank	Heat	Lane	Name	Time	Notes
1	10	4	Cameron van der Burgh (RSA)	26.14	Q, CR
2	12	5	Fabio Scozzoli (ITA)	26.46	Q
3	10	3	Aleksandr Triznov (RUS)	26.59	Q
4	11	6	Damir Dugonjič (SLO)	26.69	Q
5	11	5	Felipe França Silva (BRA)	26.74	Q
6	10	2	João Gomes Jr. (BRA)	26.76	Q
7	12	4	Roland Schoeman (RSA)	26.78	Q
8	11	3	Vladislav Polyakov (KAZ)	26.80	Q
9	11	2	Mihail Alexandrov (USA)	26.81	Q
10	12	6	Mark Gangloff (USA)	26.82	Q
11	11	4	Aleksander Hetland (NOR)	26.84	Q
12	8	3	Li Xiayan (CHN)	26.91	Q
12	10	5	Čaba Silađi (SRB)	26.91	Q
14	10	6	Stanislav Lakhtyukhov (RUS)	26.98	Q
15	12	2	Hendrik Feldwehr (GER)	27.08	Q
16	12	3	Robin van Aggele (NED)	27.12	Q
17	10	1	Lennart Stekelenburg (NED)	27.13	
18	9	6	Filipp Provorkov (EST)	27.26	
19	11	1	Brenton Rickard (AUS)	27.31	
20	9	4	Hugues Duboscq (FRA)	27.32	
21	12	7	Martti Aljand (EST)	27.35	
22	8	2	Wang Shuai (CHN)	27.39	
23	12	8	Christian Sprenger (AUS)	27.46	
24	8	5	Paul Kornfeld (CAN)	27.53	
25	9	3	Warren Barnes (CAN)	27.56	
26	8	1	Édgar Crespo (PAN)	27.72	
27	10	7	Naoya Tomita (JPN)	27.75	
28	8	4	Giedrius Titenis (LTU)	27.78	
29	7	3	Nabil Kennab (ALG)	27.80	
29	9	1	Jakob Jóhann Sveinsson (ISL)	27.80	
31	10	8	Martin Melconian (URU)	27.92	
32	11	7	Viktor Vabishchevich (BLR)	27.93	
33	8	8	Laurent Carnol (LUX)	28.00	
33	9	2	Timothy Ferris (ZIM)	28.00	
35	9	7	David Olivier Mercado (MEX)	28.07	
36	9	8	Malick Fall (SEN)	28.08	
37	8	6	Jorge Murillo (COL)	28.10	
38	6	2	Daniel Vacval (SVK)	28.11	
39	11	8	Yevgeniy Ryzhkov (KAZ)	28.17	
40	7	6	Sofiane Daid (ALG)	28.20	
41	7	4	Matej Kuchar (SVK)	28.36	
42	9	5	Sverre Naess (NOR)	28.52	
43	7	5	Vorrawuti Aumpiwan (THA)	28.63	
44	8	3	Eric Chan Wing Lim (HKG)	28.68	
45	8	7	Chen Cho-Yi (TPE)	28.75	
46	7	2	Sergiu Postica (MDA)	28.90	
47	7	1	Diego Santander (CHI)	28.95	
48	6	7	Mubarak Al-Besher (UAE)	29.04	
49	6	4	Dmitrii Aleksandrov (KGZ)	29.13	
50	6	5	Juan Guerra Quiñonez (ESA)	29.17	
51	7	8	Jehaad Alhenidi (JOR)	29.33	
52	5	6	Arturo Alejandro Montilla (DOM)	29.36	
53	7	7	Kenneth Lim Duan Le (SIN)	29.43	
54	5	5	Andrea Agius (MLT)	29.75	
54	5	3	Hycinth Cijntje (AHO)	29.75	
56	6	6	Nazih Mezayek (JOR)	29.77	
57	4	3	Hocine Haciane (AND)	29.81	
58	5	2	Chou Kit (MAC)	30.28	
59	5	1	Maximilian Siedentopf (NAM)	30.80	
60	6	8	Mohamed Jasim (UAE)	30.89	
61	5	8	Erik Rajohnson (MAD)	30.97	
62	4	4	Daniel Galea (MLT)	31.01	
63	6	1	Wael Koubrousli (LIB)	31.11	
64	4	7	Ramadhan Vyombo (KEN)	31.13	
65	5	7	Hemra Nurmuradov (TKM)	31.75	
66	1	6	Adama Ouedraogo (BUR)	32.01	
67	3	5	Ronaldo Rodrigues (GUY)	32.14	
68	4	1	Ahmad Dumairi (PLE)	32.28	
69	2	2	Ahmed Atari (QAT)	32.47	
70	4	2	Furgen Fici (ALB)	32.66	
71	4	6	Damir Davletbaev (KGZ)	32.69	
72	2	1	Kouassi Brou (CIV)	33.10	
73	3	1	Lim Jyh Jye (BRU)	33.24	
74	4	8	Shailesh Shumsher Rana (NEP)	33.26	
75	1	4	Mamadou Fofana (MLI)	33.38	
76	3	2	Mohammed Bahrin Behrom Shem (BRU)	33.49	
77	3	4	Ron Albert Roucou (SEY)	34.22	
78	2	5	Adam David Kitururu (TAN)	34.27	
79	2	7	Dionisio Augustine II (FSM)	34.37	
80	3	3	Daisuke Ssegwanyi (UGA)	34.45	
81	3	6	Muhammad Abbas Hussain (PAK)	34.85	
82	3	7	Max Kanyerezi (UGA)	35.38	
83	2	8	Mohamed Coulibaly (MLI)	35.96	
84	3	8	Giordan Harris (MHL)	38.05	
85	2	3	Nelson Masang (PLW)	39.41	
-	2	6	Kwame Apenteng (GHA)	DNS	
-	5	4	Shahjahan Ali (BAN)	DNS	
-	6	3	Loai Abdulwahid Tashkandi (KSA)	DNS	
-	1	5	Dangassat Iglay Arnaud (CGO)	DSQ	
-	2	4	Ted Fishka (ALB)	DSQ	
-	4	5	mohamed Osman (DJI)	DSQ	
-	12	1	Jakob Dorch (SWE)	DSQ	

=== Semifinals ===
Semifinal 1

Rank	Lane	Name	Time	Notes
1	8	Robin van Aggele (NED)	26.41	Q
2	4	Fabio Scozzoli (ITA)	26.46	Q
3	5	Damir Dugonjič (SLO)	26.76	
4	3	João Gomes Jr. (BRA)	26.80	
5	2	Mark Gangloff (USA)	26.83	
6	6	Vladislav Polyakov (KAZ)	26.86	
7	1	Stanislav Lakhtyukhov (RUS)	26.89	
8	7	Li Xiayan (CHN)	26.95	

Semifinal 2

Rank	Lane	Name	Time	Notes
1	3	Felipe França Silva (BRA)	26.22	Q
2	4	Cameron van der Burgh (RSA)	26.31	Q
3	2	Mihail Alexandrov (USA)	26.48	Q
4	5	Aleksandr Triznov (RUS)	26.54	Q
5	6	Roland Schoeman (RSA)	26.66	Q
6	7	Aleksander Hetland (NOR)	26.71	Q
7	1	Čaba Silađi (SRB)	26.75	
8	8	Hendrik Feldwehr (GER)	26.90	

=== Final ===
Rank	Lane	Name	Time	Notes
1st place, gold medalist(s)	4	Felipe França Silva (BRA)	25.95	CR
2nd place, silver medalist(s)	5	Cameron van der Burgh (RSA)	26.03	
3rd place, bronze medalist(s)	8	Aleksander Hetland (NOR)	26.29	
4	1	Roland Schoeman (RSA)	26.41	
5	2	Mihail Alexandrov (USA)	26.44	
6	3	Robin van Aggele (NED)	26.50	
7	7	Aleksandr Triznov (RUS)	26.71	
-	6	Fabio Scozzoli (ITA)		DQ
