= Swimming at the 2010 Asian Games – Men's 50 metre breaststroke =

Men's 50 metre breaststroke at the 2010 Asian Games
- Venue: Aoti Aquatics Centre
- Date: 14 November 2010
- Competitors: 34 from 26 nations

Medalists
gold medal	Xie Zhi	China
silver medal	Ryo Tateishi	Japan
bronze medal	Li Xiayan	China

The men's 50 metre breaststroke event at the 2010 Asian Games took place on 14 November 2010 at Guangzhou Aoti Aquatics Centre.

There were 34 competitors from 26 countries who took part in this event. Five heats were held, with most containing the maximum number of swimmers (eight). The heat in which a swimmer competed did not formally matter for advancement, as the swimmers with the top eight times from the entire field qualified for the finals.

Xie Zhi from China won the gold medal, Asian record holder Kosuke Kitajima only finished with fourth place.

== Schedule ==
All times are China Standard Time (UTC+08:00)

Date	Time	Event
Sunday, 14 November 2010	10:00	Heats
Sunday, 14 November 2010	18:59	Final

== Records ==
Prior to this competition, the existing world, Asian and Games records were as follows.

World Record	Cameron van der Burgh (RSA)	26.67	Rome, Italy	29 July 2009
Asian Record	Kosuke Kitajima (JPN)	27.30	Tokyo, Japan	13 April 2010
Games Record	Vladislav Polyakov (KAZ)	28.29	Doha, Qatar	3 December 2006

== Results ==
=== Heats ===
Rank	Heat	Athlete	Time	Notes
1	5	Li Xiayan (CHN)	27.85	GR
2	4	Mohammad Alirezaei (IRI)	27.95	
3	3	Ryo Tateishi (JPN)	28.20	
4	4	Vladislav Polyakov (KAZ)	28.23	
5	5	Kosuke Kitajima (JPN)	28.38	
6	3	Wong Chun Yan (HKG)	28.50	
7	3	Xie Zhi (CHN)	28.68	
8	4	Nicko Biondi (INA)	28.77	
9	3	Choi Kyu-woong (KOR)	28.85	
10	5	Andrew Lim (SIN)	28.93	
11	4	Sandeep Sejwal (IND)	28.96	
12	5	Yevgeniy Ryzhkov (KAZ)	28.99	
13	5	Indra Gunawan (INA)	29.03	
14	5	Lionel Khoo (SIN)	29.34	
15	3	Vorrawuti Aumpiwan (THA)	29.36	
16	3	Chen Cho-yi (TPE)	29.38	
17	4	Nguyễn Hữu Việt (VIE)	29.45	
18	4	Dmitri Aleksandrov (KGZ)	29.53	
19	3	Yap See Tuan (MAS)	29.81	
20	4	Loai Tashkandi (KSA)	29.89	
21	4	Eric Chan (HKG)	29.92	
22	5	Dmitriy Shvetsov (UZB)	30.03	
23	2	Mubarak Mohamed Al-Besher (UAE)	30.25	
24	5	Soroush Khajegi (IRI)	30.54	
25	2	Kamal Hossain (BAN)	31.16	
26	3	Chou Kit (MAC)	31.44	
27	2	Omar Yusuf (BRN)	31.48	
28	1	Ahmed Atari (QAT)	31.87	
29	2	Rami Fetyani (KSA)	31.94	
30	2	Hemra Nurmyradow (TKM)	32.13	
31	2	Ye Myint Hane (MYA)	32.97	
32	1	Hem Thon Ponleu (CAM)	33.16	
33	1	Erdenebilegiin Byambasüren (MGL)	34.37	
34	2	Inayath Hassan (MDV)	38.40	

=== Final ===
Rank	Athlete	Time	Notes
1st place, gold medalist(s)	Xie Zhi (CHN)	27.80	GR
2nd place, silver medalist(s)	Ryo Tateishi (JPN)	27.86	
3rd place, bronze medalist(s)	Li Xiayan (CHN)	27.89	
4	Mohammad Alirezaei (IRI)	28.15	
4	Kosuke Kitajima (JPN)	28.15	
4	Vladislav Polyakov (KAZ)	28.15	
7	Wong Chun Yan (HKG)	28.53	
8	Nicko Biondi (INA)	28.73	
