= Swimming at the 2011 World Aquatics Championships – Men's 200 metre breaststroke =

Men's 200 metre breaststroke at the 2011 World Aquatics Championships
- Dates: July 28, 2011 (heats and semifinals); July 29, 2011 (final)
- Competitors: 57 from 48 nations
- Winning time: 2:08.41

Medalists
gold medal	Dániel Gyurta	Hungary
silver medal	Kosuke Kitajima	Japan
bronze medal	Christian vom Lehn	Germany

The men's 200 metre breaststroke competition of the swimming events at the 2011 World Aquatics Championships was held on July 28 with the heats and the semifinals and July 29 with the final.

== Records ==
Prior to the competition, the existing world and championship records were as follows.

	Name	Nation	Time	Location	Date
World record Championship record	Christian Sprenger	Australia	2:07.31	Rome	July 30, 2009

== Results ==
=== Heats ===
55 swimmers participated in 8 heats.

Rank	Heat	Lane	Name	Nationality	Time	Notes
1	5	2	Giedrius Titenis	Lithuania	2:10.33	Q
2	8	5	Christian vom Lehn	Germany	2:10.67	Q
3	8	3	Eric Shanteau	United States	2:10.77	Q
4	6	4	Dániel Gyurta	Hungary	2:10.78	Q
5	7	3	Michael Jamieson	Great Britain	2:11.06	Q
6	7	4	Kosuke Kitajima	Japan	2:11.17	Q
7	6	8	Michael Brown	Canada	2:11.51	Q
8	7	6	Andrew Willis	Great Britain	2:11.59	Q
9	6	3	Melquiades Alvarez	Spain	2:11.86	Q
10	5	7	Glenn Snyders	New Zealand	2:12.38	Q
11	8	2	Neil Versfeld	South Africa	2:12.54	Q
12	6	2	Laurent Carnol	Luxembourg	2:12.56	Q
13	6	6	Lennart Stekelenburg	Netherlands	2:12.69	Q
14	6	7	Choi Kyu-Woong	South Korea	2:12.69	Q
15	8	4	Naoya Tomita	Japan	2:12.73	Q
16	8	7	Ákos Molnár	Hungary	2:12.78	Q
17	8	8	Huang Chaosheng	China	2:13.02	
18	7	7	Elliott Keefer	United States	2:13.13	
19	5	4	Igor Borysik	Ukraine	2:13.17	
20	8	1	Maksym Shemberev	Ukraine	2:13.18	
21	7	5	Brenton Rickard	Australia	2:13.51	
22	7	1	Xue Ruipeng	China	2:13.54	
23	8	6	Hugues Duboscq	France	2:13.56	
24	5	6	Sławomir Kuczko	Poland	2:13.75	
25	5	1	Jakob Sveinsson	Iceland	2:13.84	
26	6	1	Craig Calder	Australia	2:13.90	
27	5	5	Andrew Dickens	Canada	2:14.36	
28	4	6	Nuttapong Ketin	Thailand	2:14.68	
29	4	5	Carlos Almeida	Portugal	2:14.86	
30	7	2	Anton Lobanov	Russia	2:14.99	
31	4	1	Jorge Murillo	Colombia	2:15.41	NR
32	5	3	Hunor Mate	Austria	2:15.45	
33	7	8	Vladislav Polyakov	Kazakhstan	2:15.70	
34	3	3	Tomáš Klobučník	Slovakia	2:16.53	
35	4	4	Mattia Pesce	Italy	2:16.67	
36	3	4	Édgar Crespo	Panama	2:17.38	
37	4	7	Sofiane Daid	Algeria	2:18.32	
38	3	7	Irakli Bolkvadze	Georgia	2:18.42	
39	4	2	Martti Aljand	Estonia	2:18.65	
40	4	3	David Oliver Mercado	Mexico	2:18.72	
41	4	8	Indra Gunawan	Indonesia	2:18.89	
42	3	2	Azad Al-Barazi	Syria	2:19.71	
43	3	5	Aleksandrov Dmitrii	Kyrgyzstan	2:21.51	
44	3	8	Pedro Pinotes	Angola	2:21.65	NR
45	3	6	Juan Guerra	El Salvador	2:22.82	
46	2	3	Eli Ebenezer Wong	Northern Mariana Islands	2:23.35	
47	2	4	Genaro Britez	Paraguay	2:23.78	
48	3	1	Timothy Ferris	Zimbabwe	2:23.96	
49	2	5	Jordy Groters	Aruba	2:24.60	
50	2	7	Wael Koubrousli	Lebanon	2:27.08	
51	2	6	Diguan Pigot	Suriname	2:27.21	
52	1	5	Benjamin Schulte	Guam	2:28.21	
53	1	4	Andrew Rutherfurd	Bolivia	2:30.78	
54	2	2	Tarco Liobet	Bolivia	2:30.98	
55	1	3	Mamitina Ramanantsoa	Madagascar	2:35.35	
–	5	8	Panagiotis Samilidis	Greece		DNS
–	6	5	Alexander Dale Oen	Norway		DNS

=== Semifinals ===
The semifinals were held at 18:56.

==== Semifinal 1 ====
Rank	Lane	Name	Nationality	Time	Notes
1	3	Kosuke Kitajima	Japan	2:08.81	Q
2	5	Dániel Gyurta	Hungary	2:08.92	Q
3	4	Christian vom Lehn	Germany	2:09.44	Q
4	6	Andrew Willis	Great Britain	2:10.49	Q
5	1	Choi Kyu-Woong	South Korea	2:11.27	Q
6	2	Glenn Snyders	New Zealand	2:11.68	
7	8	Ákos Molnár	Hungary	2:12.07	
8	7	Laurent Carnol	Luxembourg	2:12.23	

==== Semifinal 2 ====
Rank	Lane	Name	Nationality	Time	Notes
1	5	Eric Shanteau	United States	2:10.03	Q
2	3	Michael Jamieson	Great Britain	2:10.54	Q
3	4	Giedrius Titenis	Lithuania	2:11.43	Q
4	6	Michael Brown	Canada	2:11.63	
5	1	Lennart Stekelenburg	Netherlands	2:11.72	
6	8	Naoya Tomita	Japan	2:11.98	
7	2	Melquiades Alvarez	Spain	2:12.15	
8	7	Neil Versfeld	South Africa	2:12.32	

=== Final ===
The final was held at 19:33.

Rank	Lane	Name	Nationality	Time	Notes
1st place, gold medalist(s)	5	Dániel Gyurta	Hungary	2:08.41	
2nd place, silver medalist(s)	4	Kosuke Kitajima	Japan	2:08.63	
3rd place, bronze medalist(s)	3	Christian vom Lehn	Germany	2:09.06	
4	6	Eric Shanteau	United States	2:09.28	
5	7	Michael Jamieson	Great Britain	2:10.67	
6	8	Giedrius Titenis	Lithuania	2:11.07	
7	1	Choi Kyu-Woong	South Korea	2:11.17	NR
8	2	Andrew Willis	Great Britain	2:11.29	
