= Swimming at the 2010 Asian Games – Men's 200 metre breaststroke =

Event at the 2010 Asian Games

Men's 200 metre breaststroke at the 2010 Asian Games
- Venue: Aoti Aquatics Centre
- Date: 18 November 2010
- Competitors: 20 from 18 nations

Medalists
gold medal	Naoya Tomita	Japan
silver medal	Xue Ruipeng	China
silver medal	Choi Kyu-woong	South Korea

The men's 200 metre breaststroke event at the 2010 Asian Games took place on 18 November 2010 at Guangzhou Aoti Aquatics Centre.

There were 20 competitors from 18 countries who took part in this event. Three heats were held, with two containing the maximum number of swimmers (eight). The heat in which a swimmer competed did not formally matter for advancement, as the swimmers with the top eight times from the entire field qualified for the finals.

Naoya Tomita from Japan won the gold medal, Xue Ruipeng from China and Choi Kyu-woong from South Korea were both awarded the silver medal due to reaching in the same time.

== Schedule ==
All times are China Standard Time (UTC+08:00)

Date	Time	Event
Thursday, 18 November 2010	09:22	Heats
Thursday, 18 November 2010	18:23	Final

== Records ==
Prior to this competition, the existing world, Asian and Games records were as follows.

World Record	Christian Sprenger (AUS)	2:07.31	Rome, Italy	30 July 2009
Asian Record	Kosuke Kitajima (JPN)	2:07.51	Barcelona, Spain	8 June 2008
Games Record	Kosuke Kitajima (JPN)	2:09.97	Busan, South Korea	2 October 2002

== Results ==
Legend

- DSQ — Disqualified

=== Heats ===
Rank	Heat	Athlete	Time	Notes
1	1	Xue Ruipeng (CHN)	2:15.20	
2	2	Choi Kyu-woong (KOR)	2:15.26	
3	2	Vladislav Polyakov (KAZ)	2:15.49	
4	1	Xie Zhi (CHN)	2:15.59	
5	3	Naoya Tomita (JPN)	2:16.06	
6	2	Nuttapong Ketin (THA)	2:16.15	
7	3	Miguel Molina (PHI)	2:17.15	
8	3	Yevgeniy Ryzhkov (KAZ)	2:17.61	
9	1	Yap See Tuan (MAS)	2:19.77	
10	2	Sandeep Sejwal (IND)	2:19.78	
11	2	Dmitriy Shvetsov (UZB)	2:20.90	
12	3	Lionel Khoo (SIN)	2:21.06	
13	3	Dmitri Aleksandrov (KGZ)	2:21.45	
14	3	Nguyễn Hữu Việt (VIE)	2:22.06	
15	1	Indra Gunawan (INA)	2:23.08	
16	1	Chen Cho-yi (TPE)	2:24.93	
17	2	Soroush Khajegi (IRI)	2:27.99	
18	3	Chou Kit (MAC)	2:29.19	
19	1	Mubarak Mohamed Al-Besher (UAE)	2:31.61	
20	2	Ahmed Atari (QAT)	2:36.48	

=== Final ===
Rank	Athlete	Time	Notes
1st place, gold medalist(s)	Naoya Tomita (JPN)	2:10.36	
2nd place, silver medalist(s)	Xue Ruipeng (CHN)	2:12.25	
2nd place, silver medalist(s)	Choi Kyu-woong (KOR)	2:12.25	
4	Xie Zhi (CHN)	2:12.37	
5	Vladislav Polyakov (KAZ)	2:12.38	
6	Yevgeniy Ryzhkov (KAZ)	2:14.94	
7	Nuttapong Ketin (THA)	2:17.79	
—	Miguel Molina (PHI)	DSQ	
