= 2010 Pan Pacific Swimming Championships – Men's 200 metre breaststroke =

Men's 200 metre breaststroke at the 2010 Pan Pacific Swimming Championships
- Venue: William Woollett Jr. Aquatics Center
- Dates: August 21, 2010 (heats & finals)
- Competitors: 22 from 10 nations
- Winning time: 2:08.36

Medalists
gold medal	Kosuke Kitajima	Japan
silver medal	Brenton Rickard	Australia
bronze medal	Eric Shanteau	United States

The men's 200 metre breaststroke competition at the 2010 Pan Pacific Swimming Championships took place on August 21 at the William Woollett Jr. Aquatics Center. The last champion was Brendan Hansen of US.

This race consisted of four lengths of the pool, all in breaststroke.

== Records ==
Prior to this competition, the existing world and Pan Pacific records were as follows:

World record	Christian Sprenger (AUS)	2:07.31	Rome, Italy	July 30, 2009
Pan Pacific Championships record	Brendan Hansen (USA)	2:08.50	Victoria, Canada	August 20, 2006

== Results ==
All times are in minutes and seconds.

KEY:	q	Fastest non-qualifiers	Q	Qualified	CR	Championships record	NR	National record	PB	Personal best	SB	Seasonal best

=== Heats ===
The first round was held on August 21, at 11:07.

Rank	Heat	Lane	Name	Nationality	Time	Notes
1	2	3	Kosuke Kitajima	Japan	2:09.23	QA
2	3	3	Eric Shanteau	United States	2:10.10	QA
3	3	6	Naoya Tomita	Japan	2:10.47	QA
4	3	5	Ryo Tateishi	Japan	2:10.55	QA
5	2	4	Brenton Rickard	Australia	2:10.93	QA
6	2	5	Yuta Suenaga	Japan	2:11.38	QA
7	3	2	Scott Spann	United States	2:12.15	QA
8	2	2	Craig Calder	Australia	2:12.42	QA
9	1	6	Elliot Keefer	United States	2:12.49	QB
10	1	4	Henrique Barbosa	Brazil	2:12.57	QB
11	3	1	Scott Dickens	Canada	2:13.35	QB
12	1	2	Michael Alexandrov	United States	2:13.98	QB
13	3	4	Christian Sprenger	Australia	2:15.02	QB
14	3	7	Glenn Snyders	New Zealand	2:15.35	QB
15	1	7	Warren Barnes	Canada	2:16.21	QB
16	2	1	Paul Kornfeld	Canada	2:16.88	QB
17	2	6	Choi Kyu-Woong	South Korea	2:17.06	
17	2	7	Miguel Molina	Philippines	2:17.06	
19	1	5	Neil Versfeld	South Africa	2:18.44	
20	1	1	Sean Nugent	Canada	2:18.84	
21	3	8	Tsui Hoi Tung	Hong Kong	2:25.09	
-	1	3	Tales Cerdeira	Brazil	DSQ	

=== B Final ===
The B final was held on August 21, at 19:33.

Rank	Lane	Name	Nationality	Time	Notes
9	4	Ryo Tateishi	Japan	2:12.74	
10	5	Elliot Keefer	United States	2:13.10	
11	3	Christian Sprenger	Australia	2:16.44	
12	2	Paul Kornfeld	Canada	2:16.51	
13	7	Miguel Molina	Philippines	2:16.83	
14	6	Warren Barnes	Canada	2:17.05	
15	1	Choi Kyu-Woong	South Korea	2:19.21	
16	8	Tsui Hoi Tung	Hong Kong	2:24.85	

=== A Final ===
The A final was held on August 21, at 19:33.

Rank	Lane	Name	Nationality	Time	Notes
1st place, gold medalist(s)	4	Kosuke Kitajima	Japan	2:08.36	CR
2nd place, silver medalist(s)	6	Brenton Rickard	Australia	2:09.97	
3rd place, bronze medalist(s)	5	Eric Shanteau	United States	2:10.13	
4	3	Naoya Tomita	Japan	2:10.99	
5	8	Scott Dickens	Canada	2:12.61	
6	7	Craig Calder	Australia	2:12.62	
7	2	Scott Spann	United States	2:13.08	
8	1	Henrique Barbosa	Brazil	2:14.42	
