= Swimming at the 2005 World Aquatics Championships – Men's 50 metre breaststroke =

Men's 50m Breaststroke at the 2005 FINA World Aquatics Championships
- Dates: 26 July 2005 (preliminaries and semifinals); 27 July 2005 (final)
- Competitors: 108 from 80 nations
- Winning time: 27.63 seconds

Medalists
gold medal	Mark Warnecke	Germany
silver medal	Mark Gangloff	United States
bronze medal	Kosuke Kitajima	Japan

The Men's 50 Breaststroke event at the 11th FINA World Aquatics Championships swam 26 and 27 July 2005 in Montreal, Canada. Preliminary and Semifinal heats were on 26 July; the final was held on 27 July.

Prior to the competition, the existing World (WR) and Championships (CR) records were:

- WR: 27.18 swum by Oleg Lisogor (Ukraine) on 2 August 2002 in Berlin, Germany;
- CR: 27.46 swum by James Gibson (Great Britain) on 22 July 2003 in Barcelona, Spain.

== Results ==
=== Final ===
Place	Swimmer	Nation	Time	Notes
1	Mark Warnecke	Germany	27.63	
2	Mark Gangloff	USA	27.71	
3	Kosuke Kitajima	JPN Japan	27.78	
4	Hugues Duboscq	France	27.87	
5	Chris Cook	Great Britain	28.00	
6	Valeriy Dymo	Ukraine	28.03	
6	Emil Tahirovic	Slovenia	28.03	
8	Brenton Rickard	Australia	28.27	

=== Semifinals ===
Rank	Heat/Lane	Swimmer	Nation	Time	Notes
1	S2 L5	Hugues Duboscq	France	27.73	q
2	S2 L3	Emil Tahirovič	Slovenia	27.81	q
3	S2 L2	Kosuke Kitajima	Japan	27.89	q
4	S2 L4	Mark Gangloff	USA	27.90	q
5	S1 L1	Chris Cook	GBR	27.91	q
6	S1 L5	Mark Warnecke	Germany	27.96	q
7	S2 L1	Valeriy Dymo	Ukraine	28.00	q
8	S1 L2	Brenton Rickard	Australia	28.04	q
9	S1 L7	Mihály Flaskay	Hungary	28.14	
10	S1 L3	Matjaž Markič	Slovenia	28.16	
11	S1 L6	Martin Gustavsson	Sweden	28.17	
12	S1 L4	James Gibson	Great Britain	28.18	
13	S2 L7	Jens Kruppa	Germany	28.23	
13	S2 L8	Jarno Pihlava	Finland	28.23	
15	S1 L8	WANG Haibo	China	28.33	
16	S2 L6	Remo Luetolf	Switzerland	28.44	

=== Preliminaries ===
Rank	Heat/Lane	Swimmer	Nation	Time	Notes
1	H13 L8	Mark Gangloff	United States	27.49	q
2	H14 L3	James Gibson	Great Britain	27.73	q
3	H13 L6	Hugues Duboscq	France	27.79	q
4	H14 L4	Mark Warnecke	Germany	27.80	q
5	H13 L5	Emil Tahirovič	Slovenia	27.81	q
6	H14 L5	Matjaž Markič	Slovenia	27.93	q
7	H12 L6	Remo Luetolf	Switzerland	27.95	q
8	H12 L8	Martin Gustavsson	Sweden	28.00	q
9	H12 L3	Kosuke Kitajima	Japan	28.03	q
9	H13 L3	Brenton Rickard	Australia	28.03	q
11	H12 L2	Jens Kruppa	Germany	28.04	q
11	H13 L1	Mihály Flaskay	Hungary	28.04	q
13	H12 L1	Valeriy Dymo	Ukraine	28.05	q
14	H12 L5	Chris Cook	Great Britain	28.06	q
15	H13 L7	Jarno Pihlava	Finland	28.10	q
15	H14 L2	WANG Haibo	China	28.10	q
17	H10 L8	Mihail Alexandrov	Bulgaria	28.16	
18	H12 L4	Oleg Lisogor	Ukraine	28.18	
19	H11 L8	Dzianis Silkov	Belarus	28.25	NR
20	H14 L8	Scott Dickens	Canada	28.38	
21	H13 L2	Daniel Málek	Czech Republic	28.43	
22	H11 L4	Alexander Dale Oen	Norway	28.48	
23	H14 L6	Mark Riley	Australia	28.49	
23	H14 L1	Lennart Stekelenburg	Netherlands	28.49	
25	H13 L4	Alessandro Terrin	Italy	28.50	
26	H11 L7	Aleksander Hetland	Norway	28.54	
26	H14 L7	Matthew Huang	Canada	28.54	
28	H11 L1	Malick Fall	Senegal	28.62	
29	H11 L5	Vladislav Polyakov	Kazakhstan	28.69	
30	H11 L6	Genki Imamura	Japan	28.70	
31	H11 L3	Mladen Tepavčević	Serbia and Montenegro	28.71	
32	H09 L6	Arsenio López	Puerto Rico	28.90	
33	H11 L2	Jakob Sveinsson	Iceland	28.92	
34	H10 L7	Yevgeniy Ryzhkov	Kazakhstan	28.93	
35	H10 L6	Scott Usher	United States	28.96	
36	H09 L3	Alwin de Prins	Luxembourg	29.02	
37	H07 L7	Mikalai Hancharov	Belarus	29.12	
38	H10 L5	Glenn Snyders	New Zealand	29.19	
39	H09 L2	Thabang Moeketsane	South Africa	29.26	
40	H10 L4	HAN Tianji	China	29.28	
41	H10 L1	Andrei Capitanciuc	Moldova	29.40	
42	H10 L2	Sergei Postica	Moldova	29.47	
43	H10 L3	Jiri Jedlicka	Czech Republic	29.56	
44	H05 L4	Aleksandr Baldin	Estonia	29.58	
45	H09 L7	Maksim Shilov	Uzbekistan	29.61	
46	H09 L5	Vorrawuti Aumpiwan	Thailand	29.68	
47	H08 L8	Terrence Haynes	Barbados	29.73	
48	H09 L8	Alfonso Espinosa	Dominican Republic	29.77	
49	H07 L1	Keun Min Jin	South Korea	29.81	
50	H09 L1	Puneet Rana	India	29.95	
51	H06 L7	Milan Glamocic	Bosnia and Herzegovina	30.03	
52	H07 L5	Kyriakos Dimosthenous	Cyprus	30.11	
53	H06 L5	Édgar Crespo	Panama	30.25	
54	H07 L4	Chan Wai Ma	Macau	30.26	
55	H06 L6	Antonio Leon	Paraguay	30.28	
56	H08 L7	Herry Yudhianto	Indonesia	30.29	
57	H06 L4	Eric Williams	Nigeria	30.33	
58	H06 L3	Kevin Hensley	Virgin Islands	30.38	
58	H08 L4	Andrey Morkovin	Uzbekistan	30.38	
60	H07 L6	Mark Tan	Singapore	30.45	
61	H07 L8	Chisela Kanchela	Zambia	30.48	
62	H04 L3	Josh Laban	Virgin Islands	30.50	
63	H08 L1	Mohamad Al-Naser	Kuwait	30.66	
64	H08 L2	Su Jong Sin	South Korea	30.68	
65	H05 L5	Ivane Lekvtadze	Georgia	30.69	
66	H05 L6	Tom Be'eri	Israel	30.72	
67	H06 L2	Leonard Tan	Singapore	30.89	
68	H08 L5	WANG Wei-Wen	Chinese Taipei	30.98	
69	H05 L2	Amar Shah	Kenya	31.37	
70	H06 L1	Joao Matias	Angola	31.38	
71	H05 L3	Khaly Ciss	Senegal	31.45	
72	H04 L4	Erik Rajohnson	Madagascar	31.62	
73	H03 L6	Aziz Abul	Pakistan	31.66	
74	H05 L8	Youssef Hafdi	Morocco	31.67	
75	H05 L1	Yousuf Alyousuf	Saudi Arabia	31.70	
76	H05 L7	Tamatoa Ellacott	Tahiti	31.90	
77	H04 L5	Sean Dehere	Barbados	31.99	
78	H04 L2	Hei Meng Lao	Macau	32.16	
79	H04 L7	Joel Refos	Suriname	32.21	
80	H04 L6	Diego Foianini	Bolivia	32.47	
81	H06 L8	Marc Dansou	Benin	32.55	
82	H04 L8	Gordon Touw Ngie Tjouw	Suriname	32.65	
83	H04 L1	Remigio Chilanle	Mozambique	33.68	
84	H03 L3	Sadeq Damrah	Palestine	33.97	
85	H01 L3	Joseph Kimani	Kenya	34.31	
86	H03 L5	Alice Shrestha	Nepal	34.61	
87	H03 L4	Khurlee Enkhmandakh	Mongolia	34.84	
88	H01 L6	Earlando McRae	Guyana	35.24	
89	H02 L8	Tony Augustine	Federated States of Micronesia	35.29	
90	H02 L2	Ian Taylor	Marshall Islands	35.50	
91	H03 L2	Bounthanom Vongphachanh	Laos	35.91	
92	H03 L1	Boldbaatar Butekhuils	Mongolia	36.12	
93	H02 L4	Connor Keith	Guam	36.46	
94	H03 L7	Khaykeo Viengmany	Laos	37.08	
95	H02 L7	Michael Taylor	Marshall Islands	37.20	
96	H02 L5	Joshua Marfleet	Samoa	38.59	
97	H02 L1	Yacoub Salem Bilal	Mauritania	45.67	
–	H03 L8	Noah Mugenyi	Uganda	DQ	
–	–	Christian Tamini	Burkina Faso	DNS	
–	–	Romain Aziz Belemtougri	Burkina Faso	DNS	
–	–	Donnie Defeitas	Saint Vincent and the Grenadines	DNS	
–	–	A. Lamine Alhousseini	Niger	DNS	
–	–	Kodjovi Mawuena Kowouvi	Togo	DNS	
–	–	Patrick Chea	Liberia	DNS	
–	–	Ayman Khattab	Egypt	DNS	
–	–	Gibrilla Bamba	Sierra Leone	DNS	
–	–	Richilieu Jackson	Liberia	DNS	
–	–	Vanja Rogulj	Croatia	DNS	
