= 2006 Pan Pacific Swimming Championships – Men's 200 metre breaststroke =

Men's 200 metre breaststroke at the 2006 Pan Pacific Swimming Championships
- Venue: Saanich Commonwealth Place
- Dates: August 20, 2006 (heats & finals)
- Competitors: 21 from 10 nations
- Winning time: 2:08.50

Medalists
| gold medal | Brendan Hansen | United States |
| silver medal | Kosuke Kitajima | Japan |
| bronze medal | Scott Usher | United States |

The men's 200 metre breaststroke competition at the 2006 Pan Pacific Swimming Championships took place on August 20 at the Saanich Commonwealth Place. The last champion was Brendan Hansen of US.

This race consisted of four lengths of the pool, all in breaststroke.

== Records ==
Prior to this competition, the existing world and Pan Pacific records were as follows:

| World record | Brendan Hansen (USA) | 2:08.74 | Irvine, United States | August 5, 2006 |
| Pan Pacific Championships record | Jim Piper (AUS) | 2:11.54 | Yokohama, Japan | August 26, 2002 |

== Results ==
All times are in minutes and seconds.

| KEY: | q | Fastest non-qualifiers | Q | Qualified | CR | Championships record | NR | National record | PB | Personal best | SB | Seasonal best |

=== Heats ===
The first round was held on August 20, at 10:49.

| Rank | Heat | Lane | Name | Nationality | Time | Notes |
|---|---|---|---|---|---|---|
| 1 | 4 | 4 | Brendan Hansen | United States | 2:10.37 | QA, CR |
| 2 | 2 | 3 | Kosuke Kitajima | Japan | 2:10.61 | QA |
| 3 | 4 | 5 | Scott Usher | United States | 2:12.04 | QA |
| 4 | 2 | 5 | Daisuke Kimura | Japan | 2:12.56 | QA |
| 5 | 2 | 4 | Genki Imamura | Japan | 2:12.84 | QA |
| 5 | 3 | 4 | Eric Shanteau | United States | 2:12.84 | QA |
| 7 | 3 | 3 | Michael Brown | Canada | 2:13.42 | QA |
| 8 | 4 | 6 | William Diering | South Africa | 2:13.60 | QA |
| 9 | 3 | 5 | Brenton Rickard | Australia | 2:13.90 | QB |
| 10 | 4 | 3 | Yuta Suenaga | Japan | 2:14.23 | QB |
| 11 | 2 | 6 | Neil Versfeld | South Africa | 2:16.04 | QB |
| 12 | 3 | 2 | Makoto Yamashita | Japan | 2:17.13 | QB |
| 13 | 4 | 1 | Sin Su-Jong | South Korea | 2:17.51 | QB |
| 14 | 2 | 2 | Henrique Barbosa | Brazil | 2:17.99 | QB |
| 15 | 3 | 1 | Glenn Snyders | New Zealand | 2:18.97 | QB |
| 16 | 3 | 7 | Mathieu Bois | Canada | 2:19.00 | QB |
| 17 | 4 | 8 | Scott Dickens | Canada | 2:20.73 | |
| 18 | 2 | 7 | Wang Wei-Wen | Chinese Taipei | 2:20.89 | |
| 19 | 2 | 1 | Chiang Hsin-Hung | Chinese Taipei | 2:22.40 | |
| 20 | 1 | 3 | Bryan Mell | Canada | 2:27.24 | |
| 21 | 1 | 5 | Benjamin Guzman | Chile | 2:31.67 | |
| - | 4 | 2 | Dean Kent | New Zealand | DSQ | |
| - | 4 | 7 | Mark Gangloff | United States | DSQ | |

=== B Final ===
The B final was held on August 20, at 19:41.

| Rank | Lane | Name | Nationality | Time | Notes |
|---|---|---|---|---|---|
| 9 | 5 | Eric Shanteau | United States | 2:12.30 | |
| 10 | 4 | Genki Imamura | Japan | 2:14.81 | |
| 11 | 7 | Mathieu Bois | Canada | 2:16.33 | |
| 12 | 6 | Henrique Barbosa | Brazil | 2:17.81 | |
| 13 | 3 | Sin Su-Jong | South Korea | 2:18.08 | |
| 14 | 2 | Glenn Snyders | New Zealand | 2:19.93 | |
| 15 | 8 | Wang Wei-Wen | Chinese Taipei | 2:20.45 | |
| 16 | 1 | Scott Dickens | Canada | 2:20.65 | |

=== A Final ===
The A final was held on August 20, at 19:41.

| Rank | Lane | Name | Nationality | Time | Notes |
|---|---|---|---|---|---|
| 1st place, gold medalist(s) | 4 | Brendan Hansen | United States | 2:08.50 | WR |
| 2nd place, silver medalist(s) | 5 | Kosuke Kitajima | Japan | 2:10.87 | |
| 3rd place, bronze medalist(s) | 3 | Scott Usher | United States | 2:11.49 | |
| 4 | 1 | Brenton Rickard | Australia | 2:11.80 | |
| 5 | 2 | Michael Brown | Canada | 2:12.56 | |
| 6 | 6 | Daisuke Kimura | Japan | 2:12.99 | |
| 7 | 7 | William Diering | South Africa | 2:13.32 | |
| 8 | 8 | Neil Versfeld | South Africa | 2:15.50 | |
