= Swimming at the 2010 Asian Games – Men's 100 metre breaststroke =

Men's 100 metre breaststroke at the 2010 Asian Games
- Venue: Aoti Aquatics Centre
- Date: 15 November 2010
- Competitors: 30 from 22 nations

Medalists
gold medal	Ryo Tateishi	Japan
silver medal	Vladislav Polyakov	Kazakhstan
bronze medal	Wang Shuai	China

The men's 100 metre breaststroke event at the 2010 Asian Games took place on 15 November 2010 at Guangzhou Aoti Aquatics Centre.

There were 30 competitors from 23 countries who took part in this event. Four heats were held, with most containing the maximum number of swimmers (eight). The heat in which a swimmer competed did not formally matter for advancement, as the swimmers with the top eight times from the entire field qualified for the finals.

Ryo Tateishi from Japan won the gold medal, Asian record holder Kosuke Kitajima only finished with fourth place.

== Schedule ==
All times are China Standard Time (UTC+08:00)

Date	Time	Event
Monday, 15 November 2010	09:41	Heats
Monday, 15 November 2010	18:41	Final

== Records ==
Prior to this competition, the existing world, Asian and Games records were as follows.

World Record	Brenton Rickard (AUS)	58.58	Rome, Italy	27 July 2009
Asian Record	Kosuke Kitajima (JPN)	58.91	Beijing, China	11 August 2008
Games Record	Kosuke Kitajima (JPN)	1:00.45	Busan, South Korea	30 September 2002

== Results ==
Legend

- DNS — Did not start

=== Heats ===
Rank	Heat	Athlete	Time	Notes
1	3	Vladislav Polyakov (KAZ)	1:01.37	
2	3	Ryo Tateishi (JPN)	1:02.27	
3	4	Kosuke Kitajima (JPN)	1:02.35	
4	2	Ma Xiang (CHN)	1:02.36	
5	3	Yevgeniy Ryzhkov (KAZ)	1:02.74	
6	4	Choi Kyu-woong (KOR)	1:02.86	
7	4	Wang Shuai (CHN)	1:02.92	
8	2	Mohammad Alirezaei (IRI)	1:03.02	
9	2	Sandeep Sejwal (IND)	1:03.67	
10	3	Yap See Tuan (MAS)	1:04.23	
11	3	Nicko Biondi (INA)	1:04.33	
12	4	Nuttapong Ketin (THA)	1:04.34	
13	3	Lionel Khoo (SIN)	1:04.36	
14	3	Wong Chun Yan (HKG)	1:04.41	
15	2	Nguyễn Hữu Việt (VIE)	1:04.57	
16	4	Indra Gunawan (INA)	1:04.70	
17	2	Vorrawuti Aumpiwan (THA)	1:04.77	
18	4	Andrew Lim (SIN)	1:05.19	
19	3	Dmitri Aleksandrov (KGZ)	1:05.24	
20	4	Dmitriy Shvetsov (UZB)	1:05.35	
21	4	Chen Cho-yi (TPE)	1:05.53	
22	2	Eric Chan (HKG)	1:05.54	
23	2	Soroush Khajegi (IRI)	1:06.53	
24	2	Mubarak Mohamed Al-Besher (UAE)	1:07.55	
25	1	Chou Kit (MAC)	1:08.04	
26	1	Kamal Hossain (BAN)	1:08.24	
27	1	Ahmed Atari (QAT)	1:10.77	
28	1	Hemra Nurmyradow (TKM)	1:13.36	
29	1	Ye Myint Hane (MYA)	1:13.54	
—	1	Erdenebilegiin Byambasüren (MGL)	DNS	

=== Final ===
Rank	Athlete	Time	Notes
1st place, gold medalist(s)	Ryo Tateishi (JPN)	1:00.38	GR
2nd place, silver medalist(s)	Vladislav Polyakov (KAZ)	1:01.03	
3rd place, bronze medalist(s)	Wang Shuai (CHN)	1:01.71	
4	Kosuke Kitajima (JPN)	1:01.85	
5	Ma Xiang (CHN)	1:01.92	
6	Choi Kyu-woong (KOR)	1:01.98	
7	Yevgeniy Ryzhkov (KAZ)	1:02.24	
8	Mohammad Alirezaei (IRI)	1:03.17	
