= Swimming at the 2002 Asian Games – Men's 200 metre breaststroke =

Men's 200 metre breaststroke at the 2002 Asian Games
- Venue: Sajik Swimming Pool
- Date: 2 October 2002
- Competitors: 19 from 15 nations

Medalists
gold medal	Kosuke Kitajima	Japan
silver medal	Daisuke Kimura	Japan
bronze medal	Ratapong Sirisanont	Thailand

The men's 100 metre breaststroke swimming competition at the 2002 Asian Games in Busan was held on 2 October at the Sajik Swimming Pool.

== Schedule ==
All times are Korea Standard Time (UTC+09:00)

Date	Time	Event
Wednesday, 2 October 2002	10:00	Heats
Wednesday, 2 October 2002	19:00	Final

== Records ==
Prior to this competition, the existing world, Asian and Games records were as follows.

World Record	Mike Barrowman (USA)	2:10.16	Barcelona, Spain	29 July 1992
Asian Record	Kosuke Kitajima (JPN)	2:10.64	Tokyo, Japan	14 June 2002
Games Record	Wang Yiwu (CHN)	2:14.56	Hiroshima, Japan	6 October 1994

== Results ==
Legend

- DNS — Did not start
- DSQ — Disqualified

=== Heats ===
Rank	Heat	Athlete	Time	Notes
1	3	Kosuke Kitajima (JPN)	2:14.36	GR
2	2	Daisuke Kimura (JPN)	2:15.55	
3	1	Ratapong Sirisanont (THA)	2:17.98	
4	2	Wang Haibo (CHN)	2:19.02	
5	3	Cheng Hao (CHN)	2:21.48	
6	3	Yevgeniy Ryzhkov (KAZ)	2:22.08	
7	3	Tam Chi Kin (HKG)	2:22.26	
8	1	Raphael Matthew Chua (PHI)	2:23.82	
9	1	Ahmed Al-Kudmani (KSA)	2:25.53	
10	2	Yang Shang-hsuan (TPE)	2:25.84	
11	3	Son Sung-uk (KOR)	2:27.14	
12	2	Trần Xuân Hiền (VIE)	2:30.36	
13	1	Niaz Ali (BAN)	2:31.70	
14	3	Alaa Feshtok (QAT)	2:47.75	
15	2	Wasseim Surey (PLE)	2:48.80	
16	3	Hamdan Feraidon (QAT)	2:52.85	
17	1	Omar Daaboul (LIB)	2:54.89	
—	2	Chen Cho-yi (TPE)	DSQ	
—	1	Elvin Chia (MAS)	DNS	

=== Final ===
Rank	Athlete	Time	Notes
1st place, gold medalist(s)	Kosuke Kitajima (JPN)	2:09.97	WR
2nd place, silver medalist(s)	Daisuke Kimura (JPN)	2:13.60	
3rd place, bronze medalist(s)	Ratapong Sirisanont (THA)	2:15.81	
4	Cheng Hao (CHN)	2:16.65	
5	Wang Haibo (CHN)	2:18.06	
6	Tam Chi Kin (HKG)	2:23.52	
7	Yevgeniy Ryzhkov (KAZ)	2:25.75	
8	Raphael Matthew Chua (PHI)	2:26.90	
