= Swimming at the 2010 Asian Games – Men's 4 × 100 metre medley relay =

Men's 4 × 100 metre medley relay at the 2010 Asian Games
- Venue: Aoti Aquatics Centre
- Date: 18 November 2010
- Competitors: 71 from 15 nations

Medalists
gold medal	Japan; Ryosuke Irie, Ryo Tateishi, Takuro Fujii, Rammaru Harada, Kosuke Kitajima, Masayuki Kishida, Shunsuke Kuzuhara
silver medal	South Korea; Park Seon-kwan, Choi Kyu-woong, Jeong Doo-hee, Park Tae-hwan, Kim Ji-heun, Chang Gyu-cheol, Park Min-kyu
bronze medal	Kazakhstan; Stanislav Ossinskiy, Vladislav Polyakov, Fedor Shkilyov, Stanislav Kuzmin, Yevgeniy Ryzhkov, Rustam Khudiyev, Artur Dilman

The men's 4 × 100 metre medley relay event at the 2010 Asian Games took place on 18 November 2010 at Guangzhou Aoti Aquatics Centre.

There were 15 teams who took part in this event. Two heats were held. The heat in which a team competed did not formally matter for advancement, as the teams with the top eight times from the both field qualified for the finals.

Japan won the gold medal with 3 minutes 34.10 seconds. China was disqualified because of Wang Shuai's false start, although they reached the terminal first.

== Schedule ==
All times are China Standard Time (UTC+08:00)

Date	Time	Event
Thursday, 18 November 2010	10:06	Heats
Thursday, 18 November 2010	19:28	Final

== Records ==
Prior to this competition, the existing world, Asian and Games records were as follows.

World Record	United States	3:27.28	Rome, Italy	2 August 2009
Asian Record	Japan	3:30.74	Rome, Italy	2 August 2009
Games Record	Japan	3:36.52	Doha, Qatar	7 December 2006

== Results ==
Legend

- DNS — Did not start
- DSQ — Disqualified

=== Heats ===
Rank	Heat	Team	Time	Notes
1	2	Japan (JPN)	3:40.78	
		Ryosuke Irie	55.89	
		Kosuke Kitajima	1:00.93	
		Masayuki Kishida	53.00	
		Shunsuke Kuzuhara	50.96	
2	1	China (CHN)	3:45.78	
		He Jianbin	55.96	
		Xue Ruipeng	1:06.02	
		Chen Weiwu	53.67	
		Shi Tengfei	50.13	
3	2	Kazakhstan (KAZ)	3:46.32	
		Stanislav Ossinskiy	57.16	
		Yevgeniy Ryzhkov	1:05.05	
		Rustam Khudiyev	54.08	
		Artur Dilman	50.03	
4	2	South Korea (KOR)	3:46.55	
		Kim Ji-heun	57.15	
		Choi Kyu-woong	1:04.21	
		Chang Gyu-cheol	54.38	
		Park Min-kyu	50.81	
5	2	Iran (IRI)	3:48.14	
		Jamal Chavoshifar	59.86	
		Mohammad Alirezaei	1:01.49	
		Saeid Maleka Ashtiani	55.19	
		Mohammad Bidarian	51.60	
6	2	Singapore (SIN)	3:48.22	
		Rainer Ng	57.66	
		Lionel Khoo	1:04.01	
		Nicholas Tan	55.18	
		Zach Ong	51.37	
7	1	Uzbekistan (UZB)	3:48.90	
		Danil Bugakov	58.93	
		Dmitriy Shvetsov	1:04.10	
		Aleksey Derlyugov	55.96	
		Daniil Tulupov	49.91	
8	2	India (IND)	3:49.38	
		Rehan Poncha	59.51	
		Sandeep Sejwal	1:03.26	
		Virdhawal Khade	54.82	
		Aaron D'Souza	51.79	
9	1	Malaysia (MAS)	3:49.82	
		Ian James Barr	58.56	
		Yap See Tuan	1:04.49	
		Daniel Bego	54.79	
		Foo Jian Beng	51.98	
10	1	Hong Kong (HKG)	3:50.09	
		Chung Lai Yeung	58.61	
		Wong Chun Yan	1:04.50	
		David Wong	54.98	
		Kong Chun Yin	52.00	
11	2	Philippines (PHI)	3:52.05	
		Charles Walker	59.17	
		Miguel Molina	1:03.93	
		Jessie Lacuna	57.23	
		Daniel Coakley	51.72	
12	1	Macau (MAC)	4:02.42	
		Antonio Tong	1:00.49	
		Chou Kit	1:09.68	
		Lao Kuan Fong	57.46	
		Lei Cheok Fong	54.79	
13	2	Qatar (QAT)	4:31.47	
		Mohammed Al-Mahmoud	1:09.04	
		Ahmed Atari	1:13.55	
		Abdulaziz Al-Marzooqi	1:06.73	
		Mohammed Hassan	1:02.15	
—	1	Indonesia (INA)	DSQ	
		I Gede Siman Sudartawa	58.90	
		Nicko Biondi	1:03.17	
		Glenn Victor Sutanto	53.86	
		Triady Fauzi Sidiq		
—	1	Athletes from Kuwait (IOC)	DNS	
		—		
		—		
		—		
		—		

=== Final ===
Rank	Team	Time	Notes
1st place, gold medalist(s)	Japan (JPN)	3:34.10	GR
	Ryosuke Irie	53.84	
	Ryo Tateishi	59.80	
	Takuro Fujii	51.43	
	Rammaru Harada	49.03	
2nd place, silver medalist(s)	South Korea (KOR)	3:38.30	
	Park Seon-kwan	55.49	
	Choi Kyu-woong	1:01.23	
	Jeong Doo-hee	53.54	
	Park Tae-hwan	48.04	
3rd place, bronze medalist(s)	Kazakhstan (KAZ)	3:40.55	
	Stanislav Ossinskiy	56.80	
	Vladislav Polyakov	1:00.41	
	Fedor Shkilyov	53.63	
	Stanislav Kuzmin	49.71	
4	Singapore (SIN)	3:47.54	
	Rainer Ng	57.08	
	Lionel Khoo	1:03.41	
	Nicholas Tan	55.58	
	Clement Lim	51.47	
5	Uzbekistan (UZB)	3:48.70	
	Danil Bugakov	58.44	
	Dmitriy Shvetsov	1:04.49	
	Aleksey Derlyugov	55.75	
	Daniil Tulupov	50.02	
6	India (IND)	3:52.97	
	M. B. Balakrishnan	1:00.10	
	Sandeep Sejwal	1:02.99	
	Rehan Poncha	57.27	
	Aaron D'Souza	52.61	
—	China (CHN)	DSQ	
	Sun Xiaolei	54.93	
	Wang Shuai		
	Zhou Jiawei		
	Lü Zhiwu		
—	Iran (IRI)	DSQ	
	Jamal Chavoshifar	59.52	
	Mohammad Alirezaei	1:02.24	
	Saeid Maleka Ashtiani		
	Mohammad Bidarian		
