= Paul Kornfeld =

Paul Kornfeld may refer to:

- Paul Kornfeld (playwright) (1889–1942), Prague-born German-language Jewish expressionist
- Paul Kornfeld (swimmer) (born 1987), American college champion in 2006–08
