= 2002 Pan Pacific Swimming Championships – Men's 200 metre breaststroke =

Men's 200 metre breaststroke at the 2002 Pan Pacific Swimming Championships
- Venue: Yokohama International Swimming Pool
- Dates: August 26, 2002 (heats & semifinals); August 27, 2002 (final)
- Competitors: 19 from 8 nations
- Winning time: 2:11.80

Medalists
gold medal	Brendan Hansen	United States
silver medal	Jim Piper	Australia
bronze medal	Daisuke Kimura	Japan

The men's 200 metre breaststroke competition at the 2002 Pan Pacific Swimming Championships took place on August 26–27 at the Yokohama International Swimming Pool. The last champion was Simon Cowley of Australia.

This race consisted of four lengths of the pool, all in breaststroke.

== Records ==
Prior to this competition, the existing world and Pan Pacific records were as follows:

World record	Mike Barrowman (USA)	2:10.16	Barcelona, Spain	July 29, 1992
Pan Pacific Championships record	Mike Barrowman (USA)	2:11.96	Edmonton, Canada	August 25, 1991

== Results ==
All times are in minutes and seconds.

KEY:	q	Fastest non-qualifiers	Q	Qualified	CR	Championships record	NR	National record	PB	Personal best	SB	Seasonal best

=== Heats ===
The first round was held on August 26.

Rank	Heat	Lane	Name	Nationality	Time	Notes
1	3	5	Daisuke Kimura	Japan	2:12.92	Q
2	3	3	Thomas Wilkens	United States	2:14.48	Q
3	1	4	Brendan Hansen	United States	2:15.68	Q
4	2	3	Mike Brown	Canada	2:15.95	Q
5	2	6	Marcelo Tomazini	Brazil	2:16.53	Q
6	2	4	Jim Piper	Australia	2:16.82	Q
7	3	6	Mark Gangloff	United States	2:16.88	Q
8	1	5	Regan Harrison	Australia	2:17.10	Q
9	1	3	David Denniston	United States	2:17.20	Q
10	1	6	John Stamhuis	Canada	2:17.30	Q
11	3	2	Kevin Clements	United States	2:17.55	Q
12	2	7	Yoshihisa Yamaguchi	Japan	2:18.74	Q
13	2	2	Wang Haibo	China	2:18.87	Q
14	1	7	Henrique Barbosa	Brazil	2:19.53	Q
15	1	2	Chad Thomsen	Canada	2:19.56	Q
16	3	7	Tam Chi Kin	Hong Kong	2:22.43	Q
17	2	1	José Belarmino Souza	Brazil	2:23.22	
18	1	1	Michael Andrew Scott	Hong Kong	2:24.24	
19	3	8	Kieran Daly	New Zealand	2:25.98	
-	2	5	Morgan Knabe	Canada	DNS	
-	3	1	Rafael Chua	Philippines	DNS	
-	3	4	Kosuke Kitajima	Japan	DNS	

=== Semifinals ===
The semifinals were held on August 26.

Rank	Heat	Lane	Name	Nationality	Time	Notes
1	1	3	Jim Piper	Australia	2:11.54	Q, CR
2	2	5	Brendan Hansen	United States	2:12.90	Q
3	1	5	Mike Brown	Canada	2:13.28	Q
4	2	4	Daisuke Kimura	Japan	2:13.48	Q
5	2	2	David Denniston	United States	2:13.73	Q
6	1	4	Thomas Wilkens	United States	2:13.84	Q
7	1	2	John Stamhuis	Canada	2:15.87	Q
8	2	6	Mark Gangloff	United States	2:16.19	Q
9	2	3	Marcelo Tomazini	Brazil	2:16.25	
10	1	6	Regan Harrison	Australia	2:16.40	
11	2	7	Wang Haibo	China	2:18.98	
12	1	7	Henrique Barbosa	Brazil	2:19.67	
13	2	1	Chad Thomsen	Canada	2:20.06	
14	1	1	Tam Chi Kin	Hong Kong	2:22.88	
15	1	8	Kieran Daly	New Zealand	2:24.45	
16	2	8	Michael Andrew Scott	Hong Kong	2:26.37	

=== Final ===
The final was held on August 27.

Rank	Lane	Name	Nationality	Time	Notes
1st place, gold medalist(s)	5	Brendan Hansen	United States	2:11.80	
2nd place, silver medalist(s)	4	Jim Piper	Australia	2:12.53	
3rd place, bronze medalist(s)	6	Daisuke Kimura	Japan	2:12.71	
4	3	Mike Brown	Canada	2:12.87	
5	2	David Denniston	United States	2:13.10	
6	8	Regan Harrison	Australia	2:15.69	
7	7	John Stamhuis	Canada	2:16.42	
8	1	Marcelo Tomazini	Brazil	2:17.25	
