= Daisuke Kimura =

Japanese swimmer (born 1981)

Personal information
- Born: 23 August 1981 (age 44)

Sport
- Sport: Swimming
- Event: Breaststroke
Medal record
Representing Japan
Pan Pacific Championships
Bronze medal – third place	2002 Yokohama	200 m breaststroke
Asian Games
Silver medal – second place	2002 Busan	200 m breaststroke
Silver medal – second place	2006 Busan	200 m breaststroke
East Asian Games
Gold medal – first place	2005 Macau	200 m breaststroke
Bronze medal – third place	2005 Macau	100 m breaststroke
Universiade
Silver medal – second place	2003 Daegu	200 m breaststroke

Daisuke Kimura (born 23 August 1981) is a Japanese former breaststroke swimmer.

Kimura was a 200-metre breaststroke silver medalist behind Kosuke Kitajima at both the 2002 and 2006 Asian Games, but got the better of the Olympic champion to win the 2006 national title. He won a bronze medal for the 200 metre breaststroke at the 2002 Pan Pacific Swimming Championships and swam in two FINA World Championships.
