= Kim Ji-heun =

South Korean swimmer (born 1989)

Personal information
- Full name: Kim Ji-heun
- National team: South Korea
- Born: 10 September 1989 (age 36) Seoul, South Korea
- Height: 1.82 m (6 ft 0 in)
- Weight: 68 kg (150 lb)

Korean name
- Hangul: 김지현
- RR: Gim Jihyeon
- MR: Kim Chihyŏn

Sport
- Sport: Swimming
- Strokes: Backstroke
Medal record
Men's swimming
Representing South Korea
Asian Games
Silver medal – second place	2010 Guangzhou	4×100 m medley

Kim Ji-heun (Korean: 김지현; born September 10, 1989) is a South Korean swimmer, who specialized in backstroke events. He represented his nation South Korea at the 2008 Summer Olympics, and also claimed a silver medal as a member of the 4×100 m medley relay team at the 2010 Asian Games in Guangzhou, China.

Kim competed for the South Korean swimming team in the men's 200 m backstroke at the 2008 Summer Olympics in Beijing. Leading up to the Games, he topped the field with a solid 2:02.13 to register under the FINA B-cut (2:03.90) at the Jeju Halla National Cup in Jeju City. Pulling from the near bottom of the pack at the 150-metre turn in heat three, Kim put up a late resistant surge on the final stretch to hit the wall with a fifth-place time and his new personal best in 2:00.72. Kim failed to advance to the semifinals, as he placed twenty-sixth out of 42 swimmers in the preliminary heats.

On May 13, 2014, Kim received a two-year suspension from the Korean Swimming Federation and Korea Anti-Doping Disciplinary Panel, after he was tested positive for the clenbuterol.
