= Vladislav Polyakov =

Kazakhstani swimmer (born 1983)

Personal information
- Full name: Vladislav Vitalyevich Polyakov
- Nickname: Vlad
- Nationality: Kazakhstan
- Born: 30 November 1983 (age 42) Petropavlovsk, Kazakh SSR, Soviet Union
- Height: 1.91 m (6 ft 3 in)
- Weight: 78 kg (172 lb)

Sport
- Sport: Swimming
- Strokes: Breaststroke
- Club: Coral Springs Swim Club (USA)
- College team: Alabama Crimson Tide (USA)
- Coach: Michael Lohberg (USA)
Medal record
Men's swimming
Representing Kazakhstan
World Championships (SC)
Gold medal – first place	2006 Shanghai	200 m breaststroke
Bronze medal – third place	2004 Indianapolis	100 m breaststroke
Bronze medal – third place	2004 Indianapolis	200 m breaststroke
Asian Games
Gold medal – first place	2006 Doha	50 m breaststroke
Silver medal – second place	2010 Guangzhou	100 m breaststroke
Bronze medal – third place	2006 Doha	100 m breaststroke
Bronze medal – third place	2006 Doha	200 m breaststroke
Bronze medal – third place	2010 Guangzhou	4×100 m medley
Universiade
Silver medal – second place	2005 İzmir	200 m breaststroke
Bronze medal – third place	2007 Bangkok	200 m breaststroke

Vladislav Vitalyevich Polyakov (also Vlad Polyakov, Russian: Владислав Витальевич Поляков; born 30 November 1983 in Petropavlovsk) is a Kazakhstani swimmer, who specialized in breaststroke events. He swam for his native Kazakhstan at three Olympic Games (2004, 2008, and 2012), and eventually finished fifth in both 100 and 200 m breaststroke at his official Olympic debut in Athens. In total, he has won eight medals in major international tournaments, including his first career gold from the 2006 FINA World Short Course Championships in Shanghai, China. While residing in the United States, Polyakov is a five-time SEC champion, a double NCAA titleholder, and a two-time gold medalist at the national championships. He also earned a total of twelve All-American titles while playing for the Alabama Crimson Tide from 2003 to 2007.

== Early life ==
Polyakov was born in Petropavlovsk, Soviet Union, the son of Vitaliy Polyakov and Galina Polyakova. During his early childhood, his family moved to Moscow, Russia, where he started swimming at the CSKA Moscow, one of Russia's top sports clubs. He was put in a national program for elite swimmers, and was forced to undergo a rigorous training that left him fatigued and mentally ill. In June 1999, Polyakov came to the United States under the guidance of his mother Galina, concerned about her son's lifetime goals. Polyakov almost gave up his sporting career before he decided to leave Eastern Europe: "At the time I left Russia I was sick mentally, I didn't want to go through another hard practice. I was so dead I was thinking about quitting swimming."

During his first trip to the United States, Polyakov met Michael Goldenberg, a former Russian water polo player working as a top-ranked official and coach. He resided in Florida with Goldenberg and family, who later became his legal guardians. He attended Saint Thomas Aquinas High School in Fort Lauderdale, graduating in 2002, and swam for the Coral Springs Swim Club under four-time Olympic coach Michael Lohberg.

== College career ==
In 2003, Polyakov accepted an athletic scholarship at the University of Alabama in Tuscaloosa, Alabama, where he swam for the Alabama Crimson Tide swimming and diving team under head coach Arthur Albeiro. While swimming for the Crimson Tide, Polyakov was a two-time NCAA champion, a five-time SEC champion, a double U.S. Open champion, and a twelve-time All-American titleholder. At the 2007 NCAA Men's Swimming and Diving Championships, during his senior year, Polyakov claimed the 200 m breaststroke title in 1:52.71, the third fastest of all time in NCAA history, just missing out a 0.09-second record set by Brendan Hansen in 2003. Gathering a laundry list of accomplishments as a college swimmer, Polyakov was later inducted to the Alabama Swimming and Diving Hall of Fame.

Polyakov also accumulated numerous honors as a student during his four-year stay at the university. He was a school's dean lister from 2002 to 2007, and was named Academic All-SEC four times. In his senior season, Polyakov was among the top swimmers to be selected by the College Sports Information Directors of America, in honor of the Men's ESPN The Magazine Academic At-Large All-Americans of the Year. In late spring of 2007, Polyakov graduated from the University of Alabama with a bachelor's degree in marketing major in international business.

== International career ==
=== 2004 Summer Olympics ===
Polyakov swam for his native country Kazakhstan in his official Olympic debut. He posted FINA A-standard entry times of 1:01.98 (100 m breaststroke) and 2:14.36 (200 m breaststroke) at the U.S. National Championships in Orlando, Florida. At the 2004 Summer Olympics in Athens, Polyakov reached a historic milestone as the first swimmer from Kazakhstan to reach an Olympic final since the nation's independent debut in 1996. Even though he was not a top medal favorite, Polyakov powered home with a fifth-place finish each in the 100 m breaststroke (1:01.34), and in the 200 m breaststroke (2:11.76).

Later that year, Polyakov won two bronze medals at the 2004 FINA Short Course World Championships in Indianapolis, Indiana. In the 100 m breaststroke, he cleared a one-minute barrier to strike his first ever career medal, posting a short-course lifetime best of 59.07. In the 200 m breaststroke, Polyakov almost missed the podium by two-hundredths of a second in 2:08.36 until he added a second bronze to his hardware, when Australia's Jim Piper was disqualified for moving before the start.

=== 2005–2007 ===
At the 2005 FINA World Championships in Montreal, Quebec, Canada, Polyakov finished eighth in the 200 m breaststroke with a time of 2:12.72. He also competed in the 100 m breaststroke, but finished his semifinal run with the second-slowest time of 1:01.70.

Two weeks later, at the 2005 Summer Universiade in İzmir, Turkey, Polyakov earned a silver medal in the 200 m breaststroke at 2:12.69, just 0.34 seconds off a leading time set by Poland's Sławomir Kuczko.

At the 2006 FINA Short Course World Championships in Shanghai, held just two weeks after the NCAA Championships, Polyakov captured his first major international title in the 200 m breaststroke. He touched the wall first in 2:06.95, holding off Australia's top favorite Brenton Rickard by more than half a second. His gold medal also marked a first for Kazakhstan in world swimming history.

Following ahis first major triumph, Polyakov clearly became one of the top medal favorites for the Asian Gamesat the peak of his sporting career. When he made his official debut at the 2006 Asian Games in Doha later that year, Polyakov competed in three individual events, including the 50 m breaststroke. In his first final, he edged out Asian record holder and Japan's top medal contender Kosuke Kitajima to secure a first gold medal for Kazakhstan at these Games, creating a new record of 28.29. Polyakov also added two more bronze medals to his hardware from these Games, finishing third in the 100 m breaststroke (1:01.63), and in the 200 m breaststroke (2:13.60). For his final event, 4 × 100 m medley relay, Polyakov helped his Kazakh teammates Stanislav Ossinskiy, Stanislav Kuzmin, and Vitaliy Khan to earn a fourth spot in a final time of 3:42.16.

In early 2007, Polyakov decided to skip from the World Championships to focus on his senior season for the Alabama Crimson Tide, handing his teammate Yevgeniy Ryzhkov a slot. In that same year, he won a bronze medal in the 200 m breaststroke at the 2007 Summer Universiade in Bangkok, in his personal best of 2:13.53.

=== 2008 Summer Olympics ===
At the 2008 Summer Olympics in Beijing, Polyakov competed in two individual events with only four days in between. He achieved FINA A-standards of 1:01.43 (100 m breaststroke) and 2:12.29 (200 m breaststroke) at the Japan International Swim Meet in Chiba. On the first day of the Games, Polyakov missed out on the semifinals in the 100 m breaststroke by nine-hundredths of a second, finishing with a time of 1:00.80. Four days later, in the 200 m breaststroke, Polyakov posted a qualifying time of 2:10.83 to earn the eleventh spot in the prelims, qualifying for the semifinals. In the following morning session, Polyakov could not match his best results from Athens four years earlier, as he placed fifteenth in the semifinals at 2:11.87.

=== 2009–2011 ===
At the 2009 FINA World Championships in Rome, Italy, Polyakov failed to reach the top 16 in any of his individual events, finishing twentieth in the 50 m breaststroke (27.57), twenty-ninth in the 100 m breaststroke (1:00.83), and eighteenth in the 200 m breaststroke (2:11.09).

Polyakov swam again in three individual events, when he swam at the 2010 Asian Games in Guangzhou, China, his second Asian Games. In his first event, 50 m breaststroke, Polyakov shared a three-way tie with Iran's Mohammad Alirezaei and Japan's top medal contender Kosuke Kitajima for fourth place in 28.15. In the 100 m breaststroke, Polyakov rebounded from that early loss, and claimed a silver medal in 1:01.03, the second-fastest time in a textile suit. Polyakov also captured a bronze as a member of the Kazakhstan team in the 4 × 100 m medley relay (3:40.55), following China's disqualification for an early takeoff on the breaststroke leg.

One month later, at the 2010 FINA Short Course World Championships in Dubai, Polyakov finished seventh in the 100 m breaststroke with a time of 58.66, failing to reach the podium for the first time in his short-course swimming career.

At the 2011 FINA World Championships in Shanghai, China, Polyakov competed again in three individual events as a lone male swimmer for Kazakhstan. His best result was reaching the semifinals in the 50 m breaststroke, finishing fourteenth with a lifetime best of 27.81.

=== 2012 Summer Olympics ===
At the 2012 Summer Olympics in London, Polyakov competed only in the 100 m breaststroke, because of a prior change in FINA's qualifying standard format. Unlike his two previous Games, he posted an Olympic selection time (formerly a B-cut) of 1:01.48 from the USA Swimming Grand Prix in Indianapolis, Indiana. Swimming in heat two, he picked up a third spot in 1:02.15, almost seven-tenths of a second (0.70) outside his entry time. Polyakov failed to advance into the semifinals, as he placed thirty-fourth overall on the first day of prelims.

== Life after swimming ==
Polyakov ended his swimming career with a total of eight medals in international tournaments, and twelve All-American titles in his college career. In September 2012, he joined the University of Louisville swimming and diving staff as an assistant coach for the Louisville Cardinals.

In 2021, Polyakov joined the Auburn Tigers swimming and diving staff as the associate head coach.

== Personal bests ==
Long course
Event	Time	Meet
50 m breaststroke	27.40	6th Asian Age Group Championship
100 m breaststroke	1:00.65	2009 Summer Universiade
200 m breaststroke	2:10.53	6th Asian Age Group Championship

Short course
Event	Time	Meet
50 m breaststroke	26.80	2010 FINA Short Course World Championships
100 m breaststroke	57.80	2010 FINA Short Course World Championships
200 m breaststroke	2:06.78	2010 FINA Short Course World Championships

== See also ==
- Alabama Crimson Tide
