= Swimming at the 2012 Summer Olympics – Men's 100 metre breaststroke =

Men's 100 metre breaststroke at the Games of the XXX Olympiad
- Venue: London Aquatics Centre
- Date: July 28, 2012 (heats & semifinals); July 29, 2012 (final)
- Competitors: 44 from 36 nations
- Winning time: 58.46 WR

Medalists
1st place, gold medalist(s)		Cameron van der Burgh	South Africa
2nd place, silver medalist(s)		Christian Sprenger	Australia
3rd place, bronze medalist(s)		Brendan Hansen	United States

The men's 100 metre breaststroke event at the 2012 Summer Olympics took place on 28–29 July at the London Aquatics Centre in London, United Kingdom.

Cameron van der Burgh smashed a new world record to end South Africa's medal drought for an Olympic gold in the event. He blasted out to a 27.07 split on the first length, and pulled strongly ahead of the field to touch the wall first in 58.46, slashing 0.12 seconds off the record set by Australia's Brenton Rickard in a high-tech bodysuit from the 2009 World Championships. An underwater camera footage also showed him executing three illegal butterfly kicks on the pullout. The champion later admitted that he was doing it, saying that by not doing it "you are falling behind or giving yourself a disadvantage." Rickard's teammate Christian Sprenger ripped off a sterling time of 58.93 to snatch the silver, moving him to sixth all time in the event's history. Meanwhile, U.S. swimmer Brendan Hansen ended his three-year retirement to take the bronze in 59.49.

Hungary's Dániel Gyurta finished off the podium with a fourth-place time and a national record in 59.53. Japan's defending Olympic champion Kosuke Kitajima witnessed his three-peat bid come to an end with a fifth-place time in 59.79. Rickard, the former world record holder, earned a sixth spot in 59.87, while Italy's Fabio Scozzoli (59.97) and Lithuania's Giedrius Titenis (1:00.84) closed out the field.

Earlier in the semifinals, Van der Burgh cleared a 59-second barrier for the second time in his career and the first in textile to pick up a final top seed in 58.83, erasing Kitajima's 2008 Olympic record by eight-hundredths of a second.

== Records ==
Prior to this competition, the existing world and Olympic records were as follows.

World record	Brenton Rickard (AUS)	58.58	Rome, Italy	27 July 2009
Olympic record	Kosuke Kitajima (JPN)	58.91	Beijing, China	11 August 2008

The following records were established during the competition:

Date	Event	Name	Nationality	Time	Record
July 28	Semifinal 1	Cameron van der Burgh	South Africa	58.83	OR
July 29	Final	Cameron van der Burgh	South Africa	58.46	WR

== Results ==
=== Heats ===
Rank	Heat	Lane	Name	Nationality	Time	Notes
1	6	3	Christian Sprenger	Australia	59.62	Q
2	6	4	Kosuke Kitajima	Japan	59.63	Q
3	6	2	Giedrius Titenis	Lithuania	59.68	Q
4	4	6	Dániel Gyurta	Hungary	59.76	Q, NR
5	5	3	Glenn Snyders	New Zealand	59.78	Q, NR
6	4	4	Cameron van der Burgh	South Africa	59.79	Q
7	5	2	Scott Dickens	Canada	59.85	Q, NR
8	6	5	Ryo Tateishi	Japan	59.86	Q
9	5	7	Michael Jamieson	Great Britain	59.89	Q
10	4	5	Brendan Hansen	United States	59.93	Q
11	5	6	Eric Shanteau	United States	59.96	Q
12	5	4	Fabio Scozzoli	Italy	59.99	Q
13	4	2	Craig Benson	Great Britain	1:00.04	Q
14	4	3	Brenton Rickard	Australia	1:00.07	Q
15	5	5	Felipe França Silva	Brazil	1:00.38	Q
16	6	6	Felipe Lima	Brazil	1:00.57	Q
17	3	4	Giacomo Perez d'Ortona	France	1:00.59	
18	5	1	Damir Dugonjič	Slovenia	1:00.77	
19	6	1	Christian vom Lehn	Germany	1:00.78	
20	4	7	Lennart Stekelenburg	Netherlands	1:00.96	
21	6	7	Hendrik Feldwehr	Germany	1:01.00	
22	3	6	Panagiotis Samilidis	Greece	1:01.20	
23	4	1	Valeriy Dymo	Ukraine	1:01.27	
23	5	8	Mattia Pesce	Italy	1:01.27	
25	3	1	Carlos Almeida	Portugal	1:01.40	
26	2	3	Laurent Carnol	Luxembourg	1:01.46	
27	6	8	Roman Sloudnov	Russia	1:01.47	
28	3	3	Li Xiayan	China	1:01.55	
29	3	8	Martin Liivamägi	Estonia	1:01.57	
29	4	8	Barry Murphy	Ireland	1:01.57	
31	2	6	Čaba Silađi	Serbia	1:01.95	
32	3	2	Dawid Szulich	Poland	1:02.07	
32	3	5	Imri Ganiel	Israel	1:02.07	
34	2	4	Vladislav Polyakov	Kazakhstan	1:02.15	
35	2	2	Édgar Crespo	Panama	1:02.18	
36	2	5	Jakob Jóhann Sveinsson	Iceland	1:02.65	
37	2	1	Malick Fall	Senegal	1:02.93	
37	3	7	Dragos Agache	Romania	1:02.93	
39	2	8	Azad Al-Barazi	Syria	1:03.48	NR
40	2	7	Danila Artiomov	Moldova	1:03.57	
41	1	4	Amini Fonua	Tonga	1:03.65	
42	1	3	Mubarak Al-Besher	United Arab Emirates	1:05.26	
43	1	5	Diguan Pigot	Suriname	1:05.55	
44	1	6	Wael Koubrousli	Lebanon	1:07.06	

=== Semifinals ===
==== Semifinal 1 ====
Rank	Lane	Name	Nationality	Time	Notes
1	3	Cameron van der Burgh	South Africa	58.83	Q, OR, AF
2	7	Fabio Scozzoli	Italy	59.44	Q
3	1	Brenton Rickard	Australia	59.50	Q
4	4	Kosuke Kitajima	Japan	59.69	Q
5	5	Dániel Gyurta	Hungary	59.74	Q, NR
6	2	Brendan Hansen	United States	59.78	Q
7	6	Ryo Tateishi	Japan	59.93	
8	8	Felipe Lima	Brazil	1:00.08	

==== Semifinal 2 ====
Rank	Lane	Name	Nationality	Time	Notes
1	4	Christian Sprenger	Australia	59.61	Q
2	5	Giedrius Titenis	Lithuania	59.66	Q
3	2	Michael Jamieson	Great Britain	59.89	
4	7	Eric Shanteau	United States	59.96	
5	8	Felipe França Silva	Brazil	1:00.01	
6	1	Craig Benson	Great Britain	1:00.13	
7	3	Glenn Snyders	New Zealand	1:00.15	
8	6	Scott Dickens	Canada	1:00.16	

=== Final ===
Rank	Lane	Name	Nationality	Time	Notes
1st place, gold medalist(s)	4	Cameron van der Burgh	South Africa	58.46	WR
2nd place, silver medalist(s)	6	Christian Sprenger	Australia	58.93	
3rd place, bronze medalist(s)	8	Brendan Hansen	United States	59.49	
4	1	Dániel Gyurta	Hungary	59.53	NR
5	7	Kosuke Kitajima	Japan	59.79	
6	3	Brenton Rickard	Australia	59.87	
7	5	Fabio Scozzoli	Italy	59.97	
8	2	Giedrius Titenis	Lithuania	1:00.84	
