= Li Xiayan =

Chinese swimmer (born 1989)

Personal information
- Born: December 17, 1989 (age 36) Dali, Yunnan, China

Sport
- Sport: Swimming
Medal record
Representing China
Asian Games
Bronze medal – third place	2010 Guangzhou	50m breaststroke

Li Xiayan (born 17 December 1989) is a Chinese swimmer. At the 2012 Summer Olympics, he competed in the Men's 100 metre breaststroke, finishing in 28th place in the heats, failing to reach the semifinals. He was also part of the Chinese men's 4 × 100 m medley relay team.
