= Ryo Tateishi =

Japanese swimmer (born 1989)

Personal information
- Nationality: Japan
- Born: June 12, 1989 (age 37) Fujisawa, Kanagawa, Japan
- Height: 182 cm (6 ft 0 in)
- Weight: 70 kg (154 lb)

Sport
- Sport: Swimming
- Strokes: Breaststroke
Medal record
Men's swimming
Representing Japan
Olympic Games
| Bronze medal – third place | 2012 London | 200 m breaststroke |
Asian Games
| Gold medal – first place | 2010 Guangzhou | 100 m breaststroke |
| Gold medal – first place | 2010 Guangzhou | 4×100 m medley |
| Silver medal – second place | 2010 Guangzhou | 50 m breaststroke |
Universiade
| Gold medal – first place | 2011 Shenzhen | 4×100 m medley |

Ryo Tateishi (立石 諒, Tateishi Ryō; born 12 June 1989 in Kanagawa) is a Japanese swimmer. At the 2012 Summer Olympics, he competed in the Men's 100 metre breaststroke, finishing in 7th place in the first semifinal, failing to reach the final. Tateishi subsequently won a bronze medal in the 200 metre breaststroke.
