= Lai Zhongjian =

Chinese swimmer (born 1988)

Personal information
- Born: January 28, 1988 (age 38) Guigang, Guangxi, China

Sport
- Sport: Swimming
Medal record
Representing China
Asian Games
Silver medal – second place	2006 Doha	4x100m medley relay

Lai Zhongjian (born January 28, 1988) is a Chinese swimmer who competed for Team China at the 2008 Summer Olympics.

== Major achievements ==
- 2004 National Championships - 1st 200 m breast;
- 2004 Olympic Games - 14th 200 m breast
