= Andrey Morkovin =

Uzbekistani swimmer (born 1985)

Personal information
- Full name: Andrey Morkovin
- National team: Uzbekistan
- Born: 9 April 1985 (age 41) Tashkent, Uzbek SSR, Soviet Union
- Height: 1.92 m (6 ft 3 1/2 in)
- Weight: 84 kg (185 lb)

Sport
- Sport: Swimming
- Strokes: Breaststroke

Andrey Morkovin (Uzbek: Андрей Морковин; born April 9, 1985) is an Uzbek former swimmer, who specialized in breaststroke events. Morkovin qualified for the men's 200 m breaststroke at the 2004 Summer Olympics in Athens, by clearing a FINA B-cut of 2:18.76 from the Russian Open Championships in Moscow. He challenged seven other swimmers in heat two, including dual citizen Mihail Alexandrov of Bulgaria. He raced to fifth place by seven tenths of a second (0.70) behind Algeria's Sofiane Daid in 2:18.48. Morkovin failed to advance into the semifinals, as he placed thirty-fourth overall in the preliminaries.
