= Ahmed Al-Kudmani =

Saudi Arabian swimmer (born 1979)

Ahmad Al-Kudmani
Personal information
- National team: Saudi Arabia
- Born: 18 August 1979 (age 47) Jeddah, Saudi Arabia
- Height: 1.81 m (5 ft 11 in)
- Weight: 79 kg (174 lb)

Sport
- Sport: Swimming
- Strokes: Breaststroke
- College team: University of Southern California (U.S.)
- Coach: Dave Salo (U.S.)
Medal record
Men's swimming
Representing Saudi Arabia
Islamic Solidarity Games
Gold medal – first place	2005 Jeddah	50 m breaststroke
Silver medal – second place	2005 Jeddah	100 m breaststroke
Bronze medal – third place	2005 Jeddah	200 m breaststroke

Ahmad Al-Kudmani (Arabic: احمد صفوان القضماني; born 18 August 1979) is a Saudi Arabian former swimmer, who specialized in breaststroke events. He is a two-time Olympian and a multiple-time medalist at the Pan Arab Games.

Al-Kudmani made his first all-male Saudi Arabian team, at the 2000 Summer Olympics in Sydney, where he competed in the men's 100 m breaststroke. Swimming in heat two, he picked up a fourth spot and fifty-sixth overall by a tenth of a second (0.10) behind Madagascar's Jean Luc Razakarivony in 1:06.07.

At the 2004 Summer Olympics in Athens, Al-Kudmani qualified again for the men's 100 m breaststroke by receiving a Universality place from FINA in an invitation time of 1:06.07. He challenged seven other swimmers on the same heat as Sydney, including his former rival Razakarivony. He blasted a Saudi Arabian record and a personal best of 1:05.65 to share a second seed with Moldova's Andrei Capitanciuc. Al-Kudmani failed to advance into the semifinals, as he placed forty-seventh overall on the first day of preliminaries.

Al-Kudmani is a former varsity swimmer for the USC Trojans, and a graduate of mechanical engineering at the University of Southern California in Los Angeles. He also competed at the Asian Games (2002 and 2006), but failed to medal in any of his individual events. In 2007, Al-Kudmani announced his retirement from swimming to spend time with his family and work for the seawater injection department at Saudi Aramco.
