= Xie Zhi =

Chinese swimmer (born 1987)

Xie Zhi 谢智
Personal information
- Full name: Xie Zhi
- Nationality: China
- Born: March 7, 1987 (age 39) Yunnan, China
- Height: 1.76 m (5 ft 9 in)
- Weight: 74 kg (163 lb)

Sport
- Sport: Swimming
- Strokes: Breaststroke
Medal record
Men's swimming
Representing China
Asian Games
Gold medal – first place	2010 Guangzhou	50 m breaststroke

Xie Zhi (谢智; born 7 March 1987 in Yunnan) is a Chinese swimmer. He won a gold medal at the 2010 Asian Games. It was the first medal for Yunnan in Asian Games.
