= Wang Haibo (swimmer) =

Chinese swimmer (born 1982)

Personal information
- Born: February 7, 1982 (age 44) Shaoxing, China

Sport
- Sport: Swimming
Medal record
Representing China
Asian Games
Bronze medal – third place	2006 Doha	50m breaststroke

Wang Haibo (Chinese: 汪海波; pinyin: Wāng Hǎibō", born 7 February 1982) is a Chinese former swimmer who competed in the 2004 Summer Olympics.
