= Eric Shanteau =

American swimmer (born 1983)

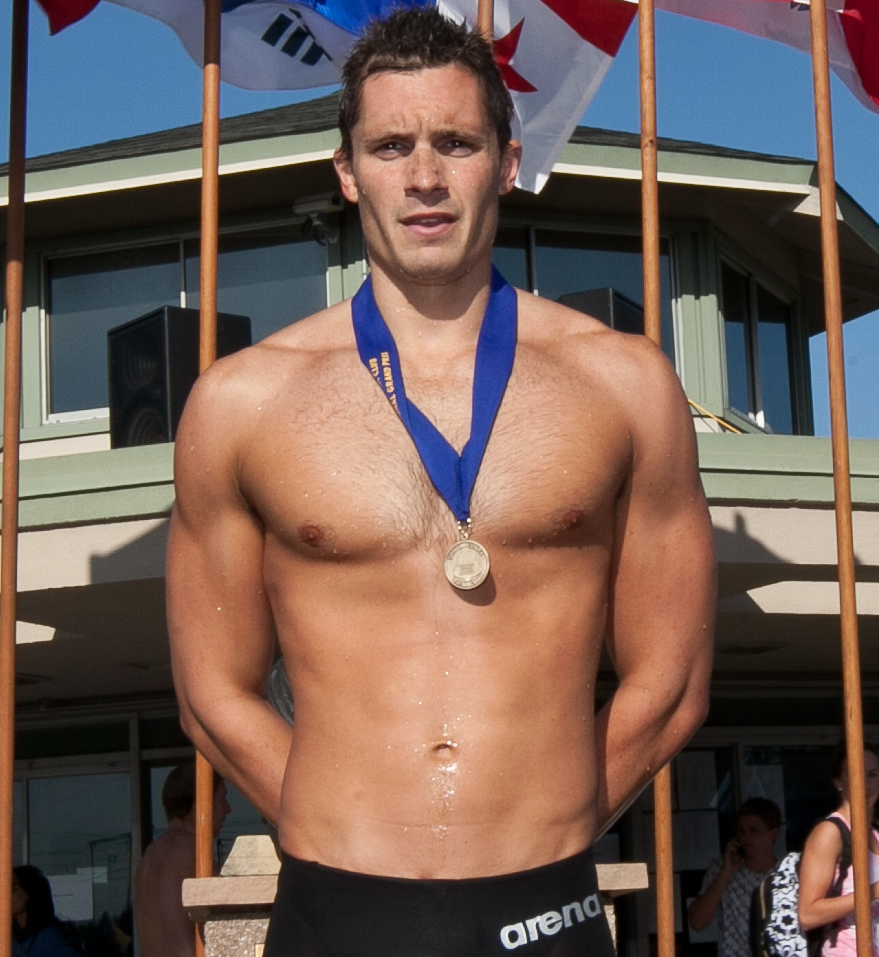
- Shanteau in 2011

Personal information
- Full name: Eric Lee Shanteau
- National team: United States
- Born: October 1, 1983 (age 42) Snellville, Georgia, U.S.
- Height: 6 ft 2 in (188 cm)
- Weight: 176 lb (80 kg)
- Spouse: Jeri Moss (m. 2011)

Sport
- Sport: Swimming
- Strokes: Breaststroke, medley
- Club: Four Winds Swim Club (High School); Longhorn Aquatics
- College team: Auburn University
- Coach: Rick Creed (Parkview High); David Marsh (Auburn); Dave Salo (2012 Olympics)
Medal record
Men's swimming
Representing the United States
Olympic Games
Gold medal – first place	2012 London	4×100 m medley
World Championships (LC)
Gold medal – first place	2009 Rome	4×100 m medley
Gold medal – first place	2011 Shanghai	4×100 m medley
Silver medal – second place	2009 Rome	200 m breaststroke
Bronze medal – third place	2009 Rome	200 m medley
World Championships (SC)
Bronze medal – third place	2004 Indianapolis	400 m medley
Pan Pacific Championships
Bronze medal – third place	2010 Irvine	200 m breaststroke
Universiade
Gold medal – first place	2005 Izmir	200 m medley
Gold medal – first place	2005 Izmir	400 m medley
Silver medal – second place	2003 Daegu	400 m medley

Eric Lee Shanteau (born October 1, 1983) is an American former competition swimmer who competed for Auburn University and won two gold medals as a member of winning United States relay teams at the World Championships. He member of the 2008 and 2012 U.S. Olympic swim teams, and earned a gold medal as a member of the winning U.S. team in the 4×100-meter medley relay at the 2012 Summer Olympics in London. Shanteau formerly held the 4×100-meter medley relay world record as a member of the U.S. team that competed at the 2009 FINA World Championship in Rome.

== Early life ==
Shanteau was born in Snellville, Georgia on October 1, 1983 to parents Rick and Janet Shanteau. His brother Ryan was a competitive swimmer for Georgia Tech. As a child, Eric began swimming for the strong youth program at Four Winds Swim Club, part of the Gwinnett County Swim League. Graduating in 2002, Eric attended Parkview High School in Lilburn, Georgia, where he swam for Rick Creed. As a strong and versatile swimmer at Parkview High, Shanteau led the team to three successive state titles. During his high school career, Shanteau became a national swimming champion, and set one individual and two relay State records while maintaining a perfect 4.0 grade point average (GPA). Parkview High Coach Rick Creed, who as a swimmer held the school record in the 200 breaststroke at Georgia State, was an important influence in Shanteau's swimming career shaping his breaststroke technique and setting him on the road to a championship career.

== College career ==
Enrolling in the Fall of 2002, Shanteau attended Auburn University, where he competed for the Auburn Tigers swimming and diving team under Head Coach David Marsh, and was an 11-time All-American. With Shanteau's participation, and Coach David Marsh's outstanding training regiment, the Auburn Men's Swimming and Diving team won the NCAA national team championship in four successive years from 2003-2006. Shanteau's time of 3:24.44 in the 400 Individual Medley remained as an Auburn school record through at least 2015. He majored in entrepreneurship and family business during his collegiate career, graduating in 2006. At the 2003 World University Games, Shanteau won a silver medal in the 400-meter individual medley. At the 2005 World University Games, he won gold in both the 200-meter and 400-meter individual medley, making him the first American to sweep both events.

== International career ==
At the 2004 United States Olympic Trials in Long Beach, California, Shanteau placed third in the 200-meter and 400-meter individual medley events, just missing a place on the Olympic roster in both events. Shanteau also placed eleventh in the 200-meter breaststroke.

== 2008 Beijing Olympics, cancer diagnosis ==
On July 3, 2008, Shanteau placed second in the 200-meter breaststroke at the 2008 U.S. Olympic Swimming Trials, guaranteeing himself a spot on the team set to compete in Beijing, China. The week before, Shanteau was informed that he had testicular cancer, but chose to compete in the meet regardless. He swam in the 200-meter breaststroke at the 2008 Summer Olympics in Beijing, where, despite missing the finals by thirteen one-hundredths (0.13) of a second, he posted a personal best time, placing tenth overall with a time of 2:10.10 in his preliminary heat. After returning to the United States, he underwent surgery to remove the cancerous testicle. Shanteau is now in remission and active in cancer awareness.

=== 2009 ===
At the 2009 U.S. National Championships and World Championship Trials in Indianapolis, Indiana, Shanteau placed second to Mark Gangloff in the 100-meter breaststroke with a time of 59.45. In the 200-meter individual medley, Shanteau placed second to Ryan Lochte with a time of 1:56.00, making him the third fastest performer ever in that event. Shanteau won the 200-meter breaststroke final in 2:08.01, breaking his own American record he set in the preliminaries of the meet. All of Shanteau's final times in Indianapolis were personal bests, and he qualified to swim all three of his individual events at the 2009 World Aquatics Championships in Rome.

At the World Championships in Rome, Shanteau placed second in the 200-meter breaststroke (2:07.65), third in the 200-meter individual medley (1:55.36), and fourth in the 100-meter breaststroke (58.98). Shanteau was also part of the U.S. 4×100-meter medley relay team Aaron Peirsol, Michael Phelps and David Walters, which won the gold medal in a new world record of 3:27.28.

In May 2011, Shanteau married Jeri Moss.

== 2012 London Olympics ==
At the 2012 U.S. Olympic Trials in Omaha, Nebraska, the qualifying event for the U.S. Olympic team, Shanteau made the team by finishing second in the 100-meter breaststroke. In preparation for the 2012 Olympics, Shanteau received training from 2012 Olympic Assistant Coach, and University of Southern California Varsity swim coach Dave Salo, who trained him at the University of Southern California prior to the Olympics.

At the 2012 Summer Olympics in London, he placed fourth in the second semi-final of the 100-meter breaststroke and did not advance to the final. In a career highlight, he earned a gold medal by swimming the breaststroke leg for the winning U.S. team in the preliminaries of the 4×100-meter medley relay. The 4x100 metre medley preliminary team composed of Nick Thurman with the backstroke leg, Shanteau with the breaststroke leg, Tyler McGill with the butterfly leg, and anchor Cullen Jones with the freestyle leg swam a combined time of 3:32.65. Later the U.S. 4x100 metre medley finals team swam a combined time of 3:29.35 for the event, with the Japanese team taking second with a 3:31.26.

=== Honors, post swimming pursuits ===
Shanteau became a member of the Auburn University Sports Hall of Fame in 2015, and is a member of the Georgia Aquatic Hall of Fame. After conquering cancer in 2008, As a legacy, Shanteau helped create the "Swim for Your Life" open water event off Lake Lanier Island in Gainesville, Georgia that featured a 5K, 1K, and 500-yard race.

Shanteau has also been a recipient of the following awards:

- Golden Goggle Award, Perseverance Award: 2008
- Golden Goggle Award, Athlete Humanitarian Award: 2012

After his cancer diagnosis, Shanteau worked as a cancer awareness advocate for the Lance Armstrong Foundation.

== Personal bests ==
Long course meters
Stroke	Distance	Time	Date
Breaststroke	100 m	58.96 AR	July 26, 2009
Breaststroke	200 m	2:07.42 AR	July 30, 2009
Medley	200 m	1:55.36	July 30, 2009
Medley	400 m	4:14.33	August 1, 2006
AR=American record

== See also ==
- List of Auburn University people
- List of Olympic medalists in swimming (men)
- List of United States records in swimming
- List of World Aquatics Championships medalists in swimming (men)
- List of world records in swimming
- World record progression 4 × 100 metres medley relay

Records
Preceded by Aaron Peirsol, Brendan Hansen, Michael Phelps, Jason Lezak	Men's 4×100-meter medley relay world record-holder August 2, 2009 – August 1, 2021; With: Aaron Peirsol, Michael Phelps, David Walters	Succeeded by Ryan Murphy, Michael Andrew, Caeleb Dressel, Zach Apple
