= Shin Su-jong =

South Korean swimmer (born 1988)

Personal information
- Full name: Shin Su-jong
- National team: South Korea
- Born: 15 February 1988 (age 38) Asan, South Korea
- Height: 1.86 m (6 ft 1 in)
- Weight: 71 kg (157 lb)

Korean name
- Hangul: 신수종
- RR: Sin Sujong
- MR: Sin Sujong

Sport
- Sport: Swimming
- Strokes: Breaststroke
Medal record
Men's swimming
Representing South Korea
Asian Championships
Silver medal – second place	2006 Singapore	4×100 m medley

Shin Su-jong (Korean: 신수종; born February 15, 1988) is a South Korean swimmer, who specialized in breaststroke events. He represented his nation South Korea at the 2008 Summer Olympics, and has won a silver medal, as a member of the men's 4 × 100 m medley relay team, at the 2006 Asian Championships in Singapore.

Shin competed for the South Korean swimming team in the men's 200 m breaststroke at the 2008 Summer Olympics in Beijing. He finished outside the semifinal time in 2:15.88 to slide under the FINA B-cut (2:18.37) at the World Championships one year earlier in Melbourne, Australia. Rallying from sixth at the 150-metre turn in heat two, Shin fought off a three-way sprint challenge from Miguel Molina of the Philippines and Martti Aljand of Estonia on the final lap to snatch the fourth spot in 2:16.21. Shin failed to advance into the semifinals, as he placed forty-third out of 53 swimmers in the prelims.
