= Paul Kornfeld (swimmer) =

American swimmer (born 1987)

Personal information
- Born: April 19, 1987 (age 39) Houston, Texas, United States
- Home town: Calgary, Alberta, Canada

Sport
- Sport: Swimming
- Strokes: Breaststroke
- Club: University of Calgary Swim Club
- College team: Stanford University

Paul Kornfeld (born April 19, 1987) is an American-born Canadian college swimming champion who, while attending Stanford University, won the 2008 NCAA Swimming and Diving Championship in the 100 yard and the 200 yard breaststroke. He competed at the 2009 World Aquatics Championships in the men's 200m breaststroke.

Born in Houston, he has also been named the Pacific-10 Conference swimmer of the year.

== See also ==
- World record progression 4 × 100 metres medley relay
