= Neil Versfeld =

South African swimmer (born 1985)

Personal information
- Full name: Neil Robert Versfeld
- National team: South Africa
- Born: 29 March 1985 (age 41) Durban, South Africa
- Height: 1.78 m (5 ft 10 in)
- Weight: 76 kg (168 lb)

Sport
- Sport: Swimming
- Strokes: Breaststroke
- Club: Seals Swimming Club
- College team: University of Georgia (U.S.)
- Coach: Jack Bauerle (U.S.)

Neil Robert Versfeld (born March 29, 1985) is a South African swimmer, who specialized in breaststroke events. He finished ninth with a superb South African record in the men's 200 m breaststroke at the 2008 Summer Olympics, and has claimed multiple South African championship titles in the 50, 100, and 200 m breaststroke.

Versfield swam collegiately for the Georgia Bulldogs at the University of Georgia (UGA). As a UGA senior in 2009, he won an individual national championship in the 200-yard breaststroke at the NCAA Championships by swimming the fastest time in the history of the event (1:51.40). At UGA, Versfeld was a seven-time All-American and graduated as the team record-holder in the 100-yard breaststroke, 200-yard breaststroke, 200-yard medley relay and 400-yard medley relay.

Versfeld competed for the South African swimming team in the men's 200 m breaststroke at the 2008 Summer Olympics in Beijing. He finished second behind William Diering with a 2:12.33 at the South African Championships four months earlier in Johannesburg to assure his selection to the Olympic team under FINA A-standard (2:13.70). Having entered the semifinals with the ninth-seeded time (2:10.50), Versfeld rebounded from his immediate defeat in the prelims to subdue a new African record in 2:10.06, but narrowly missed the top eight final by just 0.09 of a second. His ninth-place time also slashed 0.15 seconds off the continental mark, set by Diering in the initial half of the semifinal round.

At the 2009 FINA World Championships in Rome, Italy, Versfeld dipped under a 2:10 barrier to lower his South African record time to 2:09.61 in the semifinals of the 200 m breaststroke.

== See also ==
- List of University of Georgia people
