= Choi Kyu-woong =

South Korean swimmer (born 1990)

Personal information
- Nationality: South Korea
- Born: 28 May 1990 (age 36) Busan, South Korea
- Height: 1.81 m (5 ft 11 in)
- Weight: 74 kg (163 lb)

Korean name
- Hangul: 최규웅
- RR: Choe Gyuung
- MR: Ch'oe Kyuung

Sport
- Sport: Swimming
- Strokes: Breaststroke
- College team: Korea National Sport University
- Coach: Lee Woo-Shin
Medal record
Men's swimming
Representing South Korea
Asian Games
Silver medal – second place	2010 Guangzhou	200 m breaststroke
Silver medal – second place	2010 Guangzhou	4×100 m medley
East Asian Games
Silver medal – second place	2009 Hong Kong	100 m breaststroke
Bronze medal – third place	2009 Hong Kong	200 m breaststroke

Choi Kyu-woong (Korean: 최규웅; born May 28, 1990, in Busan) is a South Korean swimmer, who specialized in breaststroke events. He shared silver medals with China's Xue Ruipeng in the 200 m breaststroke at the 2010 Asian Games in Guangzhou, China, in a time of 2:12.25. He also collected two medals (silver and bronze) in both 100 and 200 m breaststroke at the 2009 East Asian Games in Hong Kong. Choi is a member of the swimming team at the Korea National Sport University in Seoul, under his personal coach Lee Woo-Shin.

Choi qualified for the men's 200 m breaststroke at the 2012 Summer Olympics in London, by breaking a South Korean record and clearing a FINA A-standard time of 2:11.17 from the FINA World Championships in Shanghai, China. He challenged seven other swimmers on the third heat, including former silver medalist Dániel Gyurta of Hungary and local favorite Michael Jamieson of Great Britain. Choi raced to seventh place by less than 0.04 of a second behind Ukraine's Igor Borysik in 2:13.57. Choi failed to advance into the semifinals, as he placed twenty-fifth overall in the preliminary heats.

He also qualified for the 2016 Olympics, again in the 200 m breaststroke.
