= Nguyễn Hữu Việt =

Vietnamese swimmer (1988–2022)

Personal information
- National team: Vietnam
- Born: 1 October 1988 Thủy Nguyên, Haiphong, Vietnam
- Died: 25 March 2022 (aged 33)
- Height: 1.82 m (6 ft 0 in)
- Weight: 80 kg (176 lb)

Sport
- Sport: Swimming
- Strokes: Breaststroke
Medal record
Men's swimming
Representing Vietnam
Southeast Asian Games
Gold medal – first place	2005 Manila	100 m breaststroke
Gold medal – first place	2007 Bangkok	100 m breaststroke
Gold medal – first place	2009 Vientiane	100 m breaststroke
Silver medal – second place	2009 Vientiane	200 m breaststroke
Bronze medal – third place	2003 Hanoi	100 m breaststroke

Nguyễn Hữu Việt (1 October 1988 – 25 March 2022) was a Vietnamese swimmer who specialized in breaststroke events. He won a total of five medals (three golds, one silver, and one bronze), and set numerous records for both the 100 and 200 m breaststroke at the Southeast Asian Games (2003–2009).

Nguyễn made his first Vietnamese Olympic team as a 15-year-old for the 2004 Summer Olympics in Athens, where he competed in the men's 100 m breaststroke. Swimming in heat three, he rounded out a field of seven swimmers to place last and fifty-second overall by two thirds of a second (0.66) behind Estonia's Aleksander Baldin, with a time of 1:06.70.

At the 2008 Summer Olympics in Beijing, Nguyễn qualified again for the second time in the 100 m breaststroke. He received a FINA wild card entry by achieving his personal best of 1:03.73 from his gold medal triumph at the 2007 Southeast Asian Games in Bangkok, Thailand. Nguyễn challenged five other swimmers in heat two, including fellow two-time Olympian Sergiu Postică of Moldova. He raced to fourth place by 0.14 of a second behind Lebanon's Wael Koubrousli in 1:06.36. Nguyễn failed to advance into the semifinals, as he placed fifty-eighth overall on the first night of the preliminaries.
