= Wang Wei-wen =

Taiwanese swimmer (born 1986)

Personal information
- Full name: Wang Wei-wen
- Nickname: The Frog Prince
- National team: Chinese Taipei
- Born: 16 December 1986 (age 39) Taipei, Taiwan
- Height: 1.75 m (5 ft 9 in)
- Weight: 74 kg (163 lb)

Sport
- Sport: Swimming
- Strokes: Breaststroke

Wang Wei-wen (Chinese: 王韋文; pinyin: Wáng Wéiwén; born 16 December 1986) is a Taiwanese swimmer, who specialized in breaststroke events. He represented the Chinese Taipei national team in two editions of the Olympic Games (2004 and 2008), and has won a career total of eight gold medals in national and regional meets across Taiwan.

Wang made his own swimming history, as a 17-year-old teen, at the 2004 Summer Olympics in Athens, where he competed in the men's 200 m breaststroke. Swimming in heat one, Wang trailed throughout the race behind Bradley Ally of Barbados, and Miguel Molina of the Philippines to come home powerfully to third and forty-second overall with a time of 2:20.65.

At the 2008 Summer Olympics in Beijing, Wang swam in the second heat of the 200 m breaststroke event, against six other competitors, including his former rival Molina. Wang struggled to maintain his crawl and pace in the entire race, but was able to finish it in last place, with a time of 2:17.20. Wang, however, failed to advance into the semi-finals, as he placed forty-ninth overall in the prelims.
