= Kosuke Kitajima =

Japanese swimmer (born 1982)

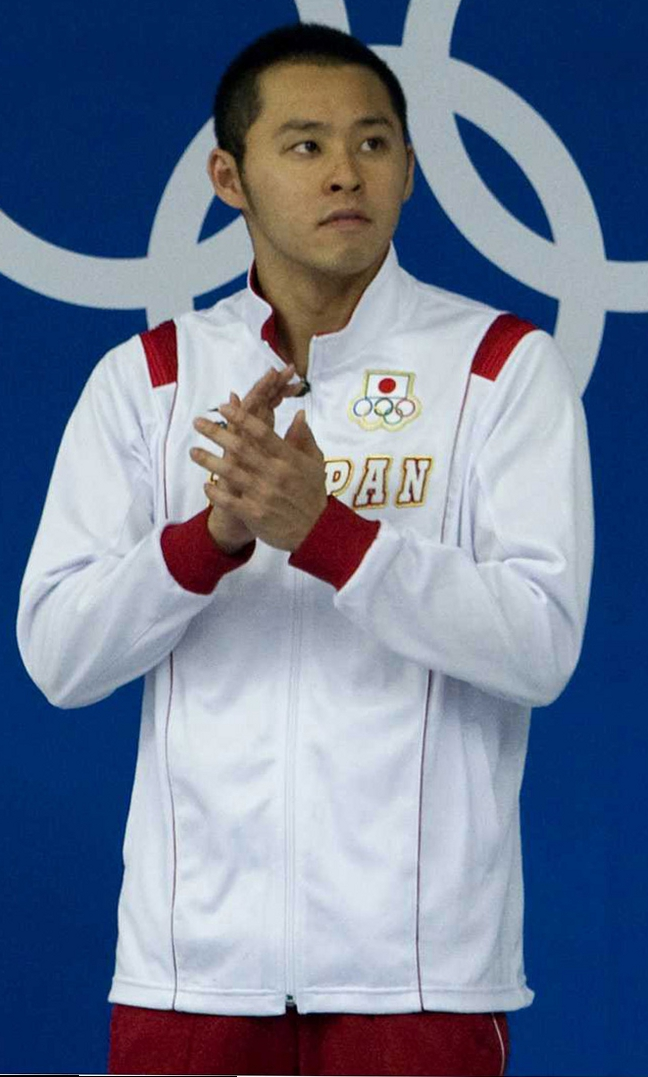

Personal information
- Nationality: Japan
- Born: September 22, 1982 (age 44) Tokyo, Japan
- Height: 177 cm (5 ft 10 in)
- Weight: 72 kg (159 lb)

Sport
- Sport: Swimming
- Strokes: Breaststroke
Medal record
Men's swimming
Representing Japan
Event	1st	2nd	3rd
Olympic Games	4	1	2
World Championships (LC)	3	4	5
World Championships (SC)	0	1	0
Pan Pacific Championships	3	3	1
Asian Games	7	1	0
Total	17	10	8
Olympic Games
Gold medal – first place	2004 Athens	100 m breaststroke
Gold medal – first place	2004 Athens	200 m breaststroke
Gold medal – first place	2008 Beijing	100 m breaststroke
Gold medal – first place	2008 Beijing	200 m breaststroke
Silver medal – second place	2012 London	4×100 m medley
Bronze medal – third place	2004 Athens	4×100 m medley
Bronze medal – third place	2008 Beijing	4×100 m medley
World Championships (LC)
Gold medal – first place	2003 Barcelona	100 m breaststroke
Gold medal – first place	2003 Barcelona	200 m breaststroke
Gold medal – first place	2007 Melbourne	200 m breaststroke
Silver medal – second place	2005 Montreal	100 m breaststroke
Silver medal – second place	2007 Melbourne	100 m breaststroke
Silver medal – second place	2007 Melbourne	4×100 m medley
Silver medal – second place	2011 Shanghai	200 m breaststroke
Bronze medal – third place	2001 Fukuoka	200 m breaststroke
Bronze medal – third place	2003 Barcelona	4×100 m medley
Bronze medal – third place	2005 Montreal	50 m breaststroke
Bronze medal – third place	2005 Montreal	4×100 m medley
Bronze medal – third place	2013 Barcelona	4×100 m medley
World Championships (SC)
Silver medal – second place	2002 Moscow	100 m breaststroke
Pan Pacific Championships
Gold medal – first place	2002 Yokohama	100 m breaststroke
Gold medal – first place	2010 Irvine	100 m breaststroke
Gold medal – first place	2010 Irvine	200 m breaststroke
Silver medal – second place	2006 Victoria	200 m breaststroke
Silver medal – second place	2006 Victoria	4×100 m medley
Silver medal – second place	2010 Irvine	4×100 m medley
Bronze medal – third place	2006 Victoria	100 m breaststroke
Asian Games
Gold medal – first place	2002 Busan	100 m breaststroke
Gold medal – first place	2002 Busan	200 m breaststroke
Gold medal – first place	2002 Busan	4×100 m medley
Gold medal – first place	2006 Doha	100 m breaststroke
Gold medal – first place	2006 Doha	200 m breaststroke
Gold medal – first place	2006 Doha	4×100 m medley
Gold medal – first place	2010 Guangzhou	4×100 m medley
Silver medal – second place	2006 Doha	50 m breaststroke

Kosuke Kitajima (北島 康介, Kitajima Kōsuke; born September 22, 1982) is a Japanese retired breaststroke swimmer. He won gold medals at the men's 100 m and 200 m breaststroke events at the 2004 Summer Olympics, and the 2008 Summer Olympics – becoming the first and only swimmer to sweep the breaststroke events at consecutive Olympic games.

== Major achievements ==
Kitajima, who was born in Tokyo, was the world record holder in the 100 m breaststroke that he set at the 2008 Beijing Olympics – this mark was broken by Brenton Rickard. He was also bronze medal winner in the same Olympics in the 4×100 m medley relay. He edged out his main rival Brendan Hansen who finished fourth while Kitajima won the gold medal and set the new world record.

He received four gold medals, one silver and two bronze medals in total at the 2004, 2008 and 2012 Olympics.

His most significant rival in the breaststroke was the American swimmer Brendan Hansen. They dueled at events such as the 2005 World Championships, 2004 Summer Olympics and 2003 World Championships. Kitajima set both world records for 100 m and 200 m breaststroke in the latter occasion. Later his best in 200 m was overcome by Dimitri Komornikov and then by Hansen, who also broke Kitajima's record in the 100 m. Kitajima regained the world record (58.91) in the 100 m at the 2008 Summer Olympics. Kitajima regained the 200 m breaststroke world record in June 2008 at the Japan Open. His time of 2:07.51 shaved nearly a second off the previous record of 2:08.50 set by Hansen in 2006.

During the 2004 Summer Olympics in Athens, Kitajima generated buzz for his primal screams of exuberance after edging out Hansen in the 100 m and 200 m breaststroke for the gold. At a pool side interview (3'24") following his victory in the 100 m, Kosuke Kitajima also popularised the phrase 'cho-kimochi-ii,' meaning "I feel really good." The word went on to win the 2004 U-Can Neologisms and Vogue Words contest.

During his gold medal-winning 100 m breaststroke race at the 2004 Olympics, he used an illegal dolphin kick on a pull-out, although he was not disqualified, and the rules were changed less than one year later to allow a single dolphin kick after the start and after each turn.

Kitajima retired in April 2016 after missing qualification for the 2016 Summer Olympics in Rio de Janeiro. He was attempting to qualify for his fifth Olympics.

=== Professional roles & legacy ===
After retiring from competition, Kitajima moved into leadership roles within swimming. In 2020, he became General Manager of the Tokyo Frog Kings, Japan’s first Asian franchise in the International Swimming League (ISL).

Under Kitajima’s management, the Frog Kings debuted in Budapest, finishing second in their opening match with 506.5 points, behind the LA Current (535.5). The team featured a largely domestic roster, with 22 of 31 athletes representing Japan, and several swimmers making their ISL debut.

Notable early performances included Suzuka Hasegawa’s ISL record in the women’s 200 m butterfly (2:03.12). Kitajima described the ISL as an opportunity for Japanese swimmers to gain experience in an international professional team format.

In January 2025, the Kosuke Kitajima Cup was held at the Tokyo Aquatics Centre, serving as a qualifying meet for the World Championships in Japan.

== Personal bests ==
In long course swimming pools Kitajima's bests are:

- 50 m breaststroke: 27.30 (13 April 2010)
- 100 m breaststroke: 58.90 (3 April 2012)
- 200 m breaststroke: 2:07.51 (8 June 2008)

== See also ==
- World record progression 100 metres breaststroke
- World record progression 200 metres breaststroke
- List of multiple Olympic gold medalists
- List of multiple Olympic gold medalists at a single Games
- List of multiple Olympic medalists

Records
Preceded by Mike Barrowman	Men's 200 metre breaststroke world record holder (long course); October 2, 2002 – June 15, 2003	Succeeded by Dmitry Komornikov
Preceded by Roman Sludnov	Men's 100 metre breaststroke world record holder (long course); July 21, 2003 – July 8, 2004	Succeeded by Brendan Hansen
Preceded by Dmitry Komornikov	Men's 200 metre breaststroke world record holder (long course); July 24, 2003 – July 11, 2004	Succeeded by Brendan Hansen
Preceded by Brendan Hansen	Men's 200 metre breaststroke world record holder (long course); June 8, 2008 – July 30, 2009	Succeeded by Christian Sprenger
Preceded by Brendan Hansen	Men's 100 metre breaststroke world record holder (long course); August 11, 2008 – July 27, 2009	Succeeded by Brenton Rickard
Awards
Preceded by Ian Thorpe	Pacific Rim Swimmer of the Year; 2003	Succeeded by Ian Thorpe
Preceded by Park Tae-Hwan	Pacific Rim Swimmer of the Year; 2007–2008	Succeeded by Zhang Lin
Preceded by Zhang Lin	Pacific Rim Swimmer of the Year; 2010	Succeeded by Sun Yang
