= Wael Koubrousli =

Lebanese swimmer (born 1988)

Wael Koubrousli / Kobrosly
Personal information
- Nationality: Lebanon
- Born: June 12, 1988 (age 38) Beirut, Lebanon
- Height: 1.85 m (6 ft 1 in)
- Weight: 85 kg (187 lb)
- Website: http://www.waelkobrosly.org

Sport
- Country: Lebanon
- Sport: Swimming
- Event(s): 100 m & 200 m breaststroke
Medal record
Pan Arab Games
Silver medal – second place	2007 Cairo	100m breaststroke

Wael Koubrousli / Kobrosly (born 12 June 1988) is a Lebanese/French swimmer who has competed at the 2008 Olympic Games, and the 2012 Olympic Games. Wael represented Lebanon in 7 World Championships from 2006 to 2013, at Shanghai, Melbourne, Manchester, Rome, UAE, Shanghai and Barcelona. He recorded more than 20 local swimming records, including in the 100-meter and 200-meter breaststroke. At the 2007 Arab Games, he won the silver medal in the 100m breaststroke.

After his participation in the Beijing Olympics, Kobrosly earned a scholarship from Club Nautique Havrais, in Le Havre, France, to study for a master's degree of International Marketing from the Le Havre Normandy University in Le Havre city, where he trained under head coach Christos Paparrodopoulos, and swam alongside Olympic triple medalist, Hugues Duboscq.

He carried the Olympic torch at the Paris 2024 Olympics.

== Participations ==
Olympic Games

- 2012 Summer Olympics (London)
- 2008 Summer Olympics (Beijing)

World Championships

- World LC Championship 2013 - Barcelona, Spain.
- World LC Championship 2011 - Shanghai, China.
- World SC Championship 2010 - Dubai, UAE.
- World LC Championship 2009 - Rome, Italy.
- World SC Championship 2008 - Manchester, England.
- World LC Championship 2007 - Melbourne, Australia.
- World SC Championship 2006 - Shanghai, China.

International Championships

- Spanish LC Nationals ELITE 2012 - Malaga, Spain (Qualification for London 2012 OG).
- French LC Nationals ELITE 2012 - Dunkirk, France. (Qualification for London 2012 OG).
- French LC Nationals 2, 2012 - Bethune, France.
- French LC Nationals 2, 2011 - Chalons Sur Saon, France.
- French SC Nationals ELITE 2010 - Chartres, France.
- Universiade Games 2009 - Belgrade, Serbia.
- Jazira-Othodoxy Swim Meet 2008 - Amman, Jordan.
- Universiade 2007 - Bangkok, Thailand.
- International Uni. Champs 2007 - Istanbul, Turkey.
- Asian Games 2006 - Doha - Qatar.

Arab competitions

- Arab Games 2011 - Doha, Qatar.
- Arab Games 2007 - Cairo, Egypt.
- Arab Clubs Champs 2006 - Irbid, Jordan.
- Islamic Solidarity Games 2005 - Jeddah, KSA.
- Arab School Championship 2004 - Jeddah, KSA.
- Jable-Lathkiyye 30 km sea race - Jable, Syria.
- West Asian Games 2005 - Doha, Qatar.
- International Friendship Champs 2004 - Kuwait.
- West Asian Games 2003 - Damascus, Syria.
