= Yevgeniy Ryzhkov =

Kazakhstani swimmer

Personal information
- Born: May 15, 1985 (age 41)
Medal record
Men's swimming
Representing Kazakhstan
World Championships (SC)
Bronze medal – third place	2006 Shanghai	200m Breaststroke

Yevgeniy Aleksandrovich Ryzhkov (Russian: Евгений Александрович Рыжков; born May 15, 1985, in Quaraghandy) is a Kazakhstani breaststroke and medley swimmer, who won the bronze medal over 200 m breaststroke at the 2006 Short Course World Championships.

== Achievements ==
- 2006 FINA Short Course World Championships - bronze medal (200 m breaststroke)
- 2004 Olympic Games - disqualified (200 m individual medley)
