= Swimming at the 2003 World Aquatics Championships – Men's 50 metre breaststroke =

Men's 50m Breaststroke at the 2003 FINA World Aquatics Championships
- Dates: 22 July (prelims, semifinals); 23 July (final)
- Winning time: 27.56 seconds

Medalists
gold medal	James Gibson	Great Britain
silver medal	Oleg Lisogor	Ukraine
bronze medal	Mihály Flaskay	Hungary

The Men's 50 Breaststroke event at the 10th FINA World Aquatics Championships swam July 22 – 23, 2003 in Barcelona, Spain. Preliminary and Semifinal heats were on 22 July, with Prelims swum in the morning session and Semifinals in the evening session. The Final swam in the evening session on 25 July.

At the start of the event, the existing World (WR) and Championship (CR) records were:

- WR: 27.18 swum by Oleg Lisogor (Ukraine) on August 2, 2002 in Berlin, Germany
- CR: 27.52 swum by Oleg Lisogor (Ukraine) on July 29, 2001 in Fukuoka, Japan

== Results ==
=== Final ===
Place	Swimmer	Nation	Time	Notes
1	James Gibson	Great Britain	27.56	
2	Oleg Lisogor	Ukraine	27.74	
3	Mihály Flaskay	Hungary	27.79	
4	Mark Warnecke	Germany	27.87	
5	Darren Mew	Great Britain	27.92	
6	Alessandro Terrin	Italy	27.98	
7	Emil Tahirovič	Slovenia	28.17	
-	Mladen Tepavčević	Yugoslavia	DQ	

=== Semifinals ===
Rank	Heat + Lane	Swimmer	Nation	Time	Notes
1	S2 L4	James Gibson	Great Britain	27.46	q, CR
2	S2 L5	Oleg Lisogor	Ukraine	27.86	q
3	S1 L5	Mark Warnecke	Germany	27.91	q
4	S1 L7	Darren Mew	Great Britain	27.98	q
5	S1 L4	Mihály Flaskay	Hungary	28.03	q
6	S1 L6	Alessandro Terrin	Italy	28.09	q
7	S2 L8	Mladen Tepavčević	Yugoslavia	28.10	q
8	S2 L3	Emil Tahirovič	Slovenia	28.12	q
9	S1 L1	Károly Güttler	Hungary	28.13	
10	S2 L6	Brenton Rickard	Australia	28.16	
11	S2 L2	Jens Kruppa	Germany	28.32	
12	S1 L2	Matjaž Markič	Slovenia	28.33	
13	S2 L7	Ed Moses	USA	28.36	
14	S1 L3	Jarno Pihlava	Finland	28.39	
15	S1 L8	Remo Lütolf	Switzerland	28.45	
16	S2 L1	Morten Nystrom	Norway	28.52	

=== Preliminaries ===
Rank	Heat+Lane	Swimmer	Nation	Time	Notes
1	H14 L5	James Gibson	Great Britain	27.54	q
2	H13 L4	Mihály Flaskay	Hungary	27.84	q
3	H14 L4	Oleg Lisogor	Ukraine	27.85	q
4	H14 L3	Mark Warnecke	Germany	27.96	q
5	H14 L1	Emil Tahirovič	Slovenia	27.97	q
6	H12 L8	Jarno Pihlava	Finland	28.04	q
7	H12 L7	Brenton Rickard	Australia	28.13	q
7	H13 L3	Alessandro Terrin	Italy	28.13	q
9	H12 L5	Jens Kruppa	Germany	28.18	q
10	H14 L6	Matjaž Markič	Slovenia	28.19	q
11	H13 L2	Ed Moses	United States	28.25	q
12	H12 L4	Darren Mew	Great Britain	28.27	q
13	H13 L8	Morten Nystrøm	Norway	28.32	q
14	H13 L5	Károly Güttler	Hungary	28.34	q
15	H13 L5	Mladen Tepavčević	FR Yugoslavia	28.42	q
16	H12 L1	Remo Lütolf	Switzerland	28.44	q
16	H14 L2	Morgan Knabe	Canada	28.44	
18	H11 L7	Martin Gustavsson	Sweden	28.51	
19	H11 L5	Chris Stewart	South Africa	28.54	
20	H10 L6	Jim Piper	Australia	28.61	
21	H14 L7	Eduardo Fischer	Brazil	28.67	
22	H11 L3	Dave Denniston	United States	28.74	
23	H13 L7	Qiliang Zeng	China	28.80	
24	H13 L6	Vanja Rogulj	Croatia	28.83	
25	H12 L2	Dmytro Krayevskyy	Ukraine	28.84	
26	H14 L8	Felipe Santos	Brazil	28.87	
27	H13 L1	Daniel Málek	Czech Republic	28.88	
28	H08 L7	Arsenio López	Puerto Rico	28.92	
29	H11 L8	Makoto Yamashita	Japan	28.93	
30	H09 L7	Mike Brown	Canada	29.00	
30	H10 L4	Malick Fall	Senegal	29.00	
32	H11 L6	Vlad Polyakov	Kazakhstan	29.05	
33	H10 L2	Alwin de Prins	Luxembourg	29.11	
34	H11 L4	Haibo Wang	China	29.18	
35	H10 L7	Sofiane Daid	Algeria	29.28	
36	H09 L4	Jon Oddur Sigurdsson	Iceland	29.49	
37	H08 L8	Rastislav Kanuk	Slovakia	29.55	
38	H08 L2	Seung Hun You	South Korea	29.63	
39	H09 L5	Andrew Bree	Ireland	29.65	
40	H09 L3	Dov Malnik	Israel	29.78	
41	H10 L3	Andrey Ivanov	Russia	29.79	
42	H08 L3	Wickus Nienaber	Swaziland	29.82	
43	H11 L2	Álvaro Fortuny	Guatemala	29.85	
44	H09 L8	Grant Galant	South Africa	29.90	
45	H11 L1	Juan Jose Madrigal	Costa Rica	30.04	
46	H10 L1	Francisco Suriano	El Salvador	30.06	
47	H09 L6	Jakob Sveinsson	Iceland	30.14	
48	H07 L5	Ranui Teriipaia	Tahiti	30.16	
48	H07 L7	Željko Panić	Bosnia and Herzegovina	30.16	
50	H09 L1	Maksim Shilov	Uzbekistan	30.25	
51	H07 L1	Eric Williams	Nigeria	30.27	
52	H07 L3	Francisco Picasso	Uruguay	30.42	
53	H09 L2	Oleg Sidorov	Uzbekistan	30.58	
54	H06 L5	Raphael Matthew Chua	Philippines	30.65	
55	H08 L4	Cheuk Lun Li	Hong Kong	30.67	
56	H08 L5	Chi Kin Tam	Hong Kong	30.69	
57	H07 L2	Ahmed Al-Kuhmani	Saudi Arabia	30.70	
58	H07 L8	Chan Wai Ma	Macau	30.77	
59	H10 L8	Jean-Luc Razakarivony	Madagascar	30.79	
60	H07 L6	Baktash Gheidi	Iran	30.89	
61	H06 L8	Kevin Hensley	Virgin Islands	31.02	
62	H06 L2	Santiago Cavanagh	Bolivia	31.21	
63	H06 L6	Terrence Haynes	Barbados	31.28	
63	H07 L4	Antonio Leon	Paraguay	31.28	
65	H08 L1	Marc Dansou	Benin	31.34	
66	H06 L7	Conrad Francis	Sri Lanka	31.53	
67	H06 L4	O. Igbekele Ayenuwa	Nigeria	31.63	
67	H06 L3	Khaly Ciss	Senegal	31.63	
69	H05 L7	Chad Miller	Fiji	32.10	
70	H05 L2	Onan Thom	Guyana	32.26	
71	H05 L8	Amar Shah	Kenya	32.29	
72	H05 L6	Chisela Kanchela	Zambia	32.31	
73	H04 L3	Hei Meng Lao	Macau	32.86	
74	H08 L6	Daniel Kang	Guam	33.41	
75	H05 L1	Joao Matias	Angola	33.72	
76	H04 L5	Enkhmandakh Khurlee	Mongolia	33.90	
77	H03 L5	Yan Lin Aung	Myanmar	34.28	
77	H04 L6	Alice Shrestha	Nepal	34.28	
79	H03 L3	Peter James Linch	Zambia	34.63	
80	H03 L1	Connor H. Keith	Guam	34.76	
81	H04 L7	Clark Randrianandraina	Madagascar	34.83	
82	H04 L1	Omar Jasim	Bahrain	34.95	
83	H01 L6	Ronald Ying	Guyana	34.98	
84	H03 L2	Guvanch Ataniyazov	Turkmenistan	35.25	
85	H02 L5	Bounthanom Vongphachanh	Laos	35.81	
86	H03 L6	Stephenson Wallace	Saint Vincent and the Grenadines	36.13	
87	H03 L4	Issam Halawani	Palestine	36.35	
88	H02 L6	Lamine Alhousseini	Niger	36.41	
89	H03 L8	Sikhounxay Ounkhamphanyavong	Laos	37.16	
90	H02 L2	Hem Lumphar	Cambodia	37.28	
91	H02 L3	Donnie Defreitas	Saint Vincent and the Grenadines	37.52	
92	H04 L8	Ganzi Mugula	Uganda	37.55	
93	H02 L1	Joshua Marfleet	Samoa	39.69	
94	H02 L7	Ali Maiga Akibou	Niger	41.95	
-	H02 L4	Dawson Grace	Samoa	DQ	
-	H05 L5	Iyad Houseya	Palestine	DQ	
-	H06 L1	Jamie Peterkin	Saint Lucia	DQ	
-	H10 L5	Andrei Capitanciuc	Moldova	DQ	
-	-	Kosuke Kitajima	Japan	DNS	
-	-	Ahmed Ouattara Zie	Ivory Coast	DNS	
-	-	Aiah Emerson Mansa Musai	Sierra Leone	DNS	
-	-	Ben Traore	Ivory Coast	DNS	
-	-	Natalya Filina	Azerbaijan	DNS	^{[Filina]}
-	-	Alain Ives Mewoutou	Cameroon	DNS	
-	-	A.A. Romain Belemtougri	Burkina Faso	DNS	
-	-	Shade Sule Cole	Cameroon	DNS	
-	-	Herve Nkurunziza	Burundi	DNS	
-	-	Emery Nziyumvira	Burundi	DNS	

Notes:

- Filina: Natalya Filina was mis-entered in the men's event, rather than the women's event.
