= Swimming at the 2001 World Aquatics Championships – Men's 100 metre breaststroke =

Men's 100 metre breaststroke at the 2001 FINA World Championships
- Dates: 23 July 2001 (heats, semifinals); 24 July 2001 (final)
- Competitors: 62
- Winning time: 1 minute 0.16 seconds

Medalists
gold medal	Roman Sloudnov	Russia
silver medal	Domenico Fioravanti	Italy
bronze medal	Ed Moses	United States

The men's 100 metre breaststroke event at the 2001 World Aquatics Championships took place 24 July. The heats and semifinals took place 23 July, with the final being held on 24 July.

== Records ==
Prior to the competition, the existing world and championship records were as follows:

World record	Roman Sludnov (RUS)	59.94	Moscow, Russia	29 June 2001
Championship record	Norbert Rózsa (HUN)	1:01.24	Rome, Italy	5 September 1994

The following record was established during the competition:

Date	Round	Name	Nation	Time	Record
23 July	Heat 7	Kosuke Kitajima	Japan	1:00.95	CR
23 July	Heat 8	Roman Sloudnov	Russia	1:00.40	CR
23 July	Semifinal 2	Roman Sloudnov	Russia	59.94	WR

== Results ==
=== Heats ===
Rank	Name	Nationality	Time	Notes
1	Roman Sloudnov	Russia	1:00.40	Q, CR
2	Kosuke Kitajima	Japan	1:00.95	Q
3	Ed Moses	United States	1:01.12	Q
4	Domenico Fioravanti	Italy	1:01.29	Q
5	Morgan Knabe	Canada	1:01.50	Q
6	Darren Mew	United Kingdom	1:01.93	Q
7	Oleg Lisogor	Ukraine	1:02.03	Q
8	Ryosuke Imai	Japan	1:02.21	Q
9	Hugues Duboscq	France	1:02.34	Q
10	Daniel Málek	Czech Republic	1:02.38	Q
11	Simon Cowley	Australia	1:02.42	Q
12	Jarno Pihlava	Finland	1:02.49	Q
13	Károly Güttler	Hungary	1:02.50	Q
13	José Couto	Portugal	1:02.50	Q
15	Eduardo Fischer	Brazil	1:02.51	Q
16	Maxim Podoprigora	Austria	1:02.52	Q
17	Jens Kruppa	Germany	1:02.54	
18	Davide Rummolo	Italy	1:02.60	
19	Dmitri Komornikov	Russia	1:02.62	
20	Regan Harrison	Australia	1:02.65	
21	Vanja Rogulj	Croatia	1:02.83	
22	Elvin Chia	Malaysia	1:02.88	
23	Anthony Robinson	United States	1:02.98	
24	Martin Gustafsson	Sweden	1:03.33	
25	Remo Lütolf	Switzerland	1:03.56	
26	Álvaro Fortuny	Guatemala	1:04.11	
27	Raiko Pachel	Estonia	1:04.36	
28	Jakob Jóhann Sveinsson	Iceland	1:04.41	
29	Dov Malnik	Israel	1:04.71	
30	Zeng Qiliang	China	1:04.93	
31	Tam Chi Kin	Hong Kong	1:04.94	
32	Wickus Nienaber	Eswatini	1:05.10	
33	Vladimir Labzin	Estonia	1:05.15	
34	Ansel Tjin A Tam	Suriname	1:05.24	
35	Valery Kalmikovs	Latvia	1:05.36	
36	Yang Shang-Hsuan	Chinese Taipei	1:05.60	
37	Michael Williamson	Ireland	1:05.78	
38	Malick Fall	Senegal	1:06.09	
39	Chen Cho-Yi	Chinese Taipei	1:06.83	
40	Jean Luc Razakarivony	Madagascar	1:07.07	
41	Abdul Hafiz Salleh	Malaysia	1:07.20	
42	Rainui Teriipaia	Tahiti	1:07.36	
43	Sergey Voytsekhovich	Uzbekistan	1:07.88	
44	Graham Smith	Bermuda	1:08.13	
45	Baktash Gheidi	Iran	1:08.40	
46	Andrei Zaharov	Moldova	1:08.72	
47	Guillermo Henriquez	Dominican Republic	1:08.90	
48	Chan Wai Ma	Macau	1:08.98	
48	Khaly Ciss	Senegal	1:08.98	
50	Daniel Kang	Guam	1:10.73	
51	Onan Thom	Guyana	1:12.48	
52	Khurlee Enkhmandakh	Mongolia	1:14.03	
53	João Carlos Paquet Aguiar	Angola	1:14.71	
53	Zie Ahmed Oyattara	Ivory Coast	1:14.71	
55	Seung Gin Lee	Northern Mariana Islands	1:15.65	
56	Alice Shrestha	Nepal	1:17.11	
57	Ganbold Urnultsaikhan	Mongolia	1:17.92	
58	Iyad Housheya	Palestine	1:18.02	
59	Dean Palacios	Northern Mariana Islands	1:18.43	
60	Fahd Bayusuf	Kenya	1:20.73	
61	Mamadou Diallo	Guinea	1:25.29	
–	Oday Mohammad	Iraq	DSQ	
–	Bounchanh Khamchanh	Laos	DNS	
–	Juan José Madrigal	Costa Rica	DNS	

=== Semifinals ===
Rank	Name	Nationality	Time	Notes
1	Roman Sloudnov	Russia	59.94	Q, WR
2	Ed Moses	United States	1:00.55	Q
3	Kosuke Kitajima	Japan	1:00.61	Q
4	Domenico Fioravanti	Italy	1:00.66	Q
5	Oleg Lisogor	Ukraine	1:01.24	Q
6	Morgan Knabe	Canada	1:01.25	Q
7	Darren Mew	United Kingdom	1:01.47	Q
8	Hugues Duboscq	France	1:01.96	Q
9	Jarno Pihlava	Finland	1:02.02	
10	Daniel Málek	Czech Republic	1:02.10	
11	José Couto	Portugal	1:02.17	
12	Károly Güttler	Hungary	1:02.18	
13	Maxim Podoprigora	Austria	1:02.22	
14	Simon Cowley	Australia	1:02.35	
15	Ryosuke Imai	Japan	1:02.49	
16	Eduardo Fischer	Brazil	1:03.08	

=== Final ===
Rank	Name	Nationality	Time	Notes
1st place, gold medalist(s)	Roman Sloudnov	Russia	1:00.16	
2nd place, silver medalist(s)	Domenico Fioravanti	Italy	1:00.47	
3rd place, bronze medalist(s)	Ed Moses	United States	1:00.61	
4	Kosuke Kitajima	Japan	1:00.67	
5	Morgan Knabe	Canada	1:01.27	
6	Oleg Lisogor	Ukraine	1:01.51	
7	Darren Mew	United Kingdom	1:01.92	
8	Hugues Duboscq	France	1:01.94	
