= Swimming at the 2001 World Aquatics Championships – Men's 50 metre breaststroke =

Men's 50 metre breaststroke at the 2001 FINA World Championships
- Dates: 28 July 2001 (heats, semifinals); 29 July 2001 (final)
- Competitors: 59
- Winning time: 27.52 seconds

Medalists
gold medal	Oleg Lisogor	Ukraine
silver medal	Roman Sloudnov	Russia
bronze medal	Domenico Fioravanti	Italy

The men's 50 metre breaststroke event at the 2001 World Aquatics Championships took place 29 July. The heats and semifinals took place 28 July, with the final being held on 29 July.

== Records ==
Prior to the competition, the existing world and championship records were as follows:

World record	Ed Moses (USA)	27.39	Austin, United States	31 March 2001
Championship record	New event			

The following record was established during the competition:

Date	Round	Name	Nation	Time	Record
28 July	Heat 7	James Gibson	United Kingdom	27.71	CR
28 July	Semifinal 2	Mark Warnecke	Germany	27.59	CR
29 July	Final	Oleg Lisogor	Ukraine	27.52	CR

== Results ==
=== Heats ===
Rank	Name	Nationality	Time	Notes
1	James Gibson	United Kingdom	27.71	Q, CR
2	Ed Moses	United States	27.82	Q
3	Mark Warnecke	Germany	27.86	Q
4	Oleg Lisogor	Ukraine	27.92	Q
5	Roman Sludnov	Russia	27.98	Q
6	Jarno Pihlava	Finland	28.18	Q
7	Daniel Málek	Czech Republic	28.22	Q
7	Darren Mew	United Kingdom	28.22	Q
9	Domenico Fioravanti	Italy	28.27	Q
10	Patrik Isaksson	Sweden	28.28	Q
11	Hugues Duboscq	France	28.44	Q
11	Anthony Robinson	United States	28.44	Q
11	Morgan Knabe	Canada	28.44	Q
14	Vanja Rogulj	Croatia	28.49	Q
15	José Couto	Portugal	28.51	Q
16	Remo Lütolf	Switzerland	28.55	Q
17	Phil Rogers	Australia	28.65	
18	Kosuke Kitajima	Japan	28.73	
19	Ryosuke Imai	Japan	28.78	
20	Eduardo Fischer	Brazil	28.80	
21	Arseni Maliarov	Russia	28.84	
21	Zeng Qiliang	China	28.84	
23	Simon Cowley	Australia	28.89	
24	Maxim Podoprigora	Austria	29.09	
25	Raiko Pachel	Estonia	29.13	
26	Álvaro Fortuny	Guatemala	29.47	
27	Martin Viilep	Estonia	29.72	
28	Tam Chi Kin	Hong Kong	29.81	
29	Dov Malnik	Israel	29.87	
29	Jakob Jóhann Sveinsson	Iceland	29.87	
31	Wickus Nienaber	Eswatini	30.16	
32	Ansel Tjin A Tam	Suriname	30.30	
33	Michael Williamson	Ireland	30.38	
34	Rainui Teriipaia	Tahiti	30.39	
35	Jean Razakarivony	Madagascar	30.48	
36	Yang Shang-Hsuan	Chinese Taipei	30.52	
37	Abdul Hafiz Salleh	Malaysia	30.68	
38	Baktash Gheidi	Iran	30.86	
39	Malick Fall	Senegal	31.23	
40	Fergus Kuek	Singapore	31.29	
41	Chan Wai Ma	Macau	31.34	
42	Khaly Ciss	Senegal	31.41	
43	Chen Cho-Yi	Chinese Taipei	31.43	
44	Guillermo Henriquez	Dominican Republic	31.44	
45	Graham Smith	Bermuda	31.72	
46	Onan Thom	Guyana	31.80	
47	Daniel Kang	Guam	31.96	
48	Inemi Jas-Spiff	Nigeria	32.54	
49	Oday Mohammad	Iraq	32.70	
50	Ahmed Ouattara Zie	Ivory Coast	32.75	
51	João Aguiar	Angola	33.02	
52	Khurlee Enkhmandakh	Mongolia	33.58	
53	Hamid Nassir	Kenya	34.02	
54	Bounchanh Khamchanh	Laos	34.61	
55	Alice Shrestha	Nepal	35.06	
56	Cole Shade Sule	Cameroon	35.12	
57	Fand Bayusuf	Kenya	35.71	
58	Iyad Housheyeh	Palestine	35.76	
–	Joshua Marfleet	Samoa	DSQ	
–	Juan José Madrigal	Costa Rica	DNS	
–	Abbas Alneel	Sudan	DNS	
–	Ganbold Urnultsaikhan	Mongolia	DNS	

=== Semifinals ===
Rank	Name	Nationality	Time	Notes
1	Mark Warnecke	Germany	27.59	Q, CR
2	Roman Sludnov	Russia	27.78	Q
3	Ed Moses	United States	27.90	Q
4	Oleg Lisogor	Ukraine	27.92	Q
5	Darren Mew	United Kingdom	27.95	Q
6	Domenico Fioravanti	Italy	27.96	Q
7	Anthony Robinson	United States	27.97	Q
8	James Gibson	United Kingdom	28.01	Q
9	Remo Lütolf	Switzerland	28.06	
10	Daniel Málek	Czech Republic	28.23	
11	Morgan Knabe	Canada	28.33	
12	Vanja Rogulj	Croatia	28.37	
13	Hugues Duboscq	France	28.40	
14	Patrik Isaksson	Sweden	28.59	
15	José Couto	Portugal	28.62	
16	Jarno Pihlava	Finland	28.65	

=== Final ===
Rank	Name	Nationality	Time	Notes
1st place, gold medalist(s)	Oleg Lisogor	Ukraine	27.52	CR
2nd place, silver medalist(s)	Roman Sludnov	Russia	27.60	
3rd place, bronze medalist(s)	Domenico Fioravanti	Italy	27.72	
4	Anthony Robinson	United States	27.73	
5	Mark Warnecke	Germany	27.93	
6	Ed Moses	United States	28.02	
7	Darren Mew	United Kingdom	28.05	
–	James Gibson	United Kingdom	DSQ	
