= Swimming at the 2004 Summer Olympics – Men's 100 metre breaststroke =

Men's 100 metre breaststroke at the Games of the XXVIII Olympiad
- Venue: Athens Olympic Aquatic Centre
- Date: August 14, 2004 (heats & semifinals); August 15, 2004 (final)
- Competitors: 60 from 55 nations
- Winning time: 1:00.08

Medalists
1st place, gold medalist(s)		Kosuke Kitajima	Japan
2nd place, silver medalist(s)		Brendan Hansen	United States
3rd place, bronze medalist(s)		Hugues Duboscq	France

The men's 100 metre breaststroke event at the 2004 Summer Olympics was contested at the Olympic Aquatic Centre of the Athens Olympic Sports Complex in Athens, Greece on August 14 and 15.

After finishing fourth in Sydney (2000), Japan's Kosuke Kitajima edged out U.S. swimmer and world-record holder Brendan Hansen to claim the gold medal by 0.17 of a second, in a time of 1:00.08. Katajima used an illegal dolphin kick during a pull-out, however he was not disqualified, and the rules were changed less than a year later to allow for a single dolphin kick after the start and after each wall. Hansen, who turned 23 on the final day, earned a silver in 1:00.25, while France's Hugues Duboscq held off onrushing American Mark Gangloff to take the bronze in 1:00.88.

Earlier in the semifinals Hansen lowered an Olympic record to 1:00.01 that had been set by his archrival Kitajima in the preliminaries by just 0.02 of a second.

Russia's Roman Sloudnov, the third-fastest man in Olympic history and the first to swim under one minute, missed the top 8 final by 0.18 seconds (1:01.54).

== Records ==
Prior to this competition the existing world and Olympic records were as follows.

World record	Brendan Hansen (USA)	59.30	Long Beach, United States	8 July 2004
Olympic record	Domenico Fioravanti (ITA)	1:00.46	Sydney, Australia	17 September 2000

The following new world and Olympic records were set during this competition.

Date	Event	Name	Nationality	Time	Record
August 14	Heat 7	Kosuke Kitajima	Japan	1:00.03	OR
August 14	Semifinal 1	Brendan Hansen	United States	1:00.01	OR

== Results ==
=== Heats ===
Rank	Heat	Lane	Name	Nationality	Time	Notes
1	7	4	Kosuke Kitajima	Japan	1:00.03	Q, OR
2	8	4	Brendan Hansen	United States	1:00.25	Q
3	6	5	Mark Gangloff	United States	1:00.81	Q
4	6	4	Darren Mew	Great Britain	1:00.89	Q
5	7	3	James Gibson	Great Britain	1:00.99	Q
6	7	5	Hugues Duboscq	France	1:01.15	Q
7	6	1	Vladislav Polyakov	Kazakhstan	1:01.16	Q
8	8	7	Jens Kruppa	Germany	1:01.19	Q
9	8	3	Oleg Lisogor	Ukraine	1:01.21	Q
10	6	3	Roman Sloudnov	Russia	1:01.65	Q
11	8	1	Eduardo Fischer	Brazil	1:01.84	Q
12	6	6	Richárd Bodor	Hungary	1:01.91	Q
13	7	7	Jarno Pihlava	Finland	1:01.99	Q
14	7	6	Thijs van Valkengoed	Netherlands	1:02.03	Q
15	6	2	Dmitry Komornikov	Russia	1:02.05	Q
16	7	1	René Kolonko	Germany	1:02.09	Q
17	7	2	Emil Tahirovic	Slovenia	1:02.12	
18	8	5	Morgan Knabe	Canada	1:02.13	
19	8	6	Scott Dickens	Canada	1:02.16	
19	8	2	Jim Piper	Australia	1:02.16	
21	8	8	Alexander Dale Oen	Norway	1:02.25	
22	6	7	Martin Gustavsson	Sweden	1:02.53	
23	4	4	Jakob Johann Sveinsson	Iceland	1:02.97	
24	5	6	Terence Parkin	South Africa	1:03.05	
25	5	2	Maxim Podoprigora	Austria	1:03.08	
26	7	8	Vanja Rogulj	Croatia	1:03.16	
27	5	1	Alwin de Prins	Luxembourg	1:03.32	
28	5	3	Daniel Málek	Czech Republic	1:03.35	
29	5	8	Mladen Tepavčević	Serbia and Montenegro	1:03.52	
30	6	8	Wang Haibo	China	1:03.54	
31	3	4	You Seung-hun	South Korea	1:03.56	
32	5	7	Sofiane Daid	Algeria	1:03.63	
33	5	5	José Couto	Portugal	1:03.72	
34	5	4	Remo Lütolf	Switzerland	1:03.82	
35	3	6	Chen Cho-yi	Chinese Taipei	1:03.94	
36	3	5	Ben Labowitch	New Zealand	1:03.99	
36	4	7	Arsenio López	Puerto Rico	1:03.99	
38	3	7	Aurimas Valaitis	Lithuania	1:04.11	
39	4	1	Christos Papadopoulos	Greece	1:04.43	
40	4	3	Malick Fall	Senegal	1:04.50	
41	4	2	Bradley Ally	Barbados	1:04.71	
42	4	8	Wickus Nienaber	Swaziland	1:04.74	
43	4	6	Cristian Mauro Soldano	Argentina	1:05.05	
44	2	4	Tam Chi Kin	Hong Kong	1:05.11	
45	3	2	Alvaro Fortuny	Guatemala	1:05.41	
46	3	1	Kyriakos Dimosthenous	Cyprus	1:05.54	
47	2	7	Ahmed Al-Kudmani	Saudi Arabia	1:05.65	
47	2	1	Andrei Capitanciuc	Moldova	1:05.65	
49	3	3	Aleksander Baldin	Estonia	1:06.04	
50	2	6	Raphael Matthew Chua	Philippines	1:06.37	
51	2	2	Pāvels Murāns	Latvia	1:06.45	
52	3	8	Nguyen Huu Viet	Vietnam	1:06.70	
53	1	5	Eric Williams	Nigeria	1:07.69	
54	2	8	Jean Luc Razakarivony	Madagascar	1:07.74	
55	2	5	Yevgeny Petrashov	Kyrgyzstan	1:07.78	
56	2	3	Oleg Sidorov	Uzbekistan	1:08.30	
57	1	4	Chisela Kanchela	Zambia	1:09.95	
58	1	3	Amar Shah	Kenya	1:10.17	
59	1	6	Alice Shrestha	Nepal	1:12.25	
	4	5	Ratapong Sirisanont	Thailand	DSQ	

=== Semifinals ===
==== Semifinal 1 ====
Rank	Lane	Name	Nationality	Time	Notes
1	4	Brendan Hansen	United States	1:00.01	Q, OR
2	5	Darren Mew	Great Britain	1:00.83	Q
3	3	Hugues Duboscq	France	1:01.17	Q
4	2	Roman Sloudnov	Russia	1:01.54	
5	6	Jens Kruppa	Germany	1:01.68	
6	8	René Kolonko	Germany	1:01.82	
7	7	Richárd Bodor	Hungary	1:01.88	
8	1	Thijs van Valkengoed	Netherlands	1:02.36	

==== Semifinal 2 ====
Rank	Lane	Name	Nationality	Time	Notes
1	4	Kosuke Kitajima	Japan	1:00.27	Q
2	3	James Gibson	Great Britain	1:01.07	Q
2	2	Oleg Lisogor	Ukraine	1:01.07	Q
2	5	Mark Gangloff	United States	1:01.07	Q
5	3	Vladislav Polyakov	Kazakhstan	1:01.36	Q
6	8	Dmitry Komornikov	Russia	1:01.83	
7	1	Jarno Pihlava	Finland	1:01.86	
8	7	Eduardo Fischer	Brazil	1:02.07	

=== Final ===
Rank	Lane	Name	Nationality	Time	Notes
1st place, gold medalist(s)	5	Kosuke Kitajima	Japan	1:00.08	
2nd place, silver medalist(s)	4	Brendan Hansen	United States	1:00.25	
3rd place, bronze medalist(s)	1	Hugues Duboscq	France	1:00.88	
4	6	Mark Gangloff	United States	1:01.17	
5	8	Vladislav Polyakov	Kazakhstan	1:01.34	
6	7	James Gibson	Great Britain	1:01.36	
7	3	Darren Mew	Great Britain	1:01.66	
8	2	Oleg Lisogor	Ukraine	1:02.42	
