= Swimming at the 2000 Summer Olympics – Men's 100 metre breaststroke =

Men's 100 metre breaststroke at the Games of the XXVII Olympiad
- Venue: Sydney International Aquatic Centre
- Date: September 16, 2000 (heats & semifinals); September 17, 2000 (final)
- Competitors: 66 from 61 nations
- Winning time: 1:00.46 OR

Medalists
1st place, gold medalist(s)		Domenico Fioravanti	Italy
2nd place, silver medalist(s)		Ed Moses	United States
3rd place, bronze medalist(s)		Roman Sloudnov	Russia

The men's 100 metre breaststroke event at the 2000 Summer Olympics took place on 16–17 September at the Sydney International Aquatic Centre in Sydney, Australia.

Domenico Fioravanti made an Olympic milestone to become Italy's first ever gold medalist in swimming. He stormed home on the final lap to establish a new Olympic standard of 1:00.46, cutting off Frédérik Deburghgraeve's 1996 record by 0.14 seconds. U.S. swimmer Ed Moses enjoyed a strong lead on the first length of the pool, but ended up only with a silver in 1:00.73. Meanwhile, Russia's world record holder Roman Sloudnov took the bronze in 1:00.91.

Japan's Kosuke Kitajima, who later emerged as the world's top breaststroke swimmer of the decade, pulled off a fourth-place finish in 1:01.34. Czech Republic's Daniel Málek earned a fifth spot in a national record of 1:01.50, and was followed in sixth by Canada's Morgan Knabe with a time of 1:01.58. South Africa's Brett Petersen (1:01.63) and Switzerland's Remo Lütolf (1:01.88) closed out the field.

Notable swimmers failed to reach the top 8 final, featuring four-time Olympians Károly Güttler of Hungary and Mark Warnecke of Germany, Australia's overwhelming favorite Phil Rogers, and New Zealand's Steven Ferguson, the son of former Olympic champion Ian Ferguson, who later became one of the most successful kayakers in the sport.

Shortly before the next Olympics, Fioravanti was forced to retire from swimming after failing a routine medical test carried by the Italian National Olympic Committee. Tests revealed that he was diagnosed with a genetic heart anomaly.

== Records ==
Prior to this competition, the existing world and Olympic records were as follows.

World record	Roman Sloudnov (RUS)	1:00.36	Moscow, Russia	15 June 2000
Olympic record	Frédérik Deburghgraeve (BEL)	1:00.60	Atlanta, United States	20 July 1996

The following new world and Olympic records were set during this competition.

Date	Event	Name	Nationality	Time	Record
17 September	Final	Domenico Fioravanti	Italy	1:00.46	OR

== Results ==
=== Heats ===
Rank	Heat	Lane	Name	Nationality	Time	Notes
1	8	5	Domenico Fioravanti	Italy	1:01.32	Q, NR
2	8	1	Daniel Málek	Czech Republic	1:01.56	Q, NR
3	8	4	Ed Moses	United States	1:01.59	Q
4	7	7	Károly Güttler	Hungary	1:01.66	Q
5	7	5	Kosuke Kitajima	Japan	1:01.68	Q
6	7	3	Morgan Knabe	Canada	1:01.81	Q
7	7	6	Dmitry Komornikov	Russia	1:01.87	Q
8	9	8	Marcel Wouda	Netherlands	1:02.00	Q, NR
9	9	7	Jens Kruppa	Germany	1:02.09	Q
10	9	4	Roman Sloudnov	Russia	1:02.15	Q
11	8	3	Brett Petersen	South Africa	1:02.20	Q
12	9	5	Jarno Pihlava	Finland	1:02.21	Q
13	9	2	Oleg Lisogor	Ukraine	1:02.24	Q
14	7	8	Hugues Duboscq	France	1:02.40	Q
15	8	6	Darren Mew	Great Britain	1:02.42	Q
16	8	2	Remo Lütolf	Switzerland	1:02.54	Q
17	6	5	Phil Rogers	Australia	1:02.77	
18	8	8	José Couto	Portugal	1:02.79	
19	6	6	Elvin Chia	Malaysia	1:02.81	
20	9	6	Mark Warnecke	Germany	1:02.85	
21	9	3	Akira Hayashi	Japan	1:02.86	
22	6	4	Patrick Schmollinger	Austria	1:02.87	
23	7	2	Adam Whitehead	Great Britain	1:02.91	
24	6	2	Marek Krawczyk	Poland	1:03.00	
25	7	4	Pat Calhoun	United States	1:03.03	
26	9	1	Patrik Isaksson	Sweden	1:03.05	
27	6	3	Steven Ferguson	New Zealand	1:03.06	
28	7	1	Terence Parkin	South Africa	1:03.11	
29	8	7	Zhu Yi	China	1:03.20	
30	6	7	Vanja Rogulj	Croatia	1:03.58	
31	6	1	Eduardo Fischer	Brazil	1:03.72	
32	6	8	Raiko Pachel	Estonia	1:03.99	
32	5	5	Tal Stricker	Israel	1:03.99	
34	4	3	Valērijs Kalmikovs	Latvia	1:04.02	
34	4	7	Arsenio López	Puerto Rico	1:04.02	
36	3	1	Vadim Tatarov	Moldova	1:04.12	NR
37	3	4	Francisco Suriano	El Salvador	1:04.31	NR
38	5	6	Alvaro Fortuny	Guatemala	1:04.35	
39	5	3	Alwin de Prins	Luxembourg	1:04.37	
40	5	2	Yang Shang-hsuan	Chinese Taipei	1:04.54	
41	4	5	Andrew Bree	Ireland	1:04.58	
42	4	2	Nikola Savčić	FR Yugoslavia	1:04.64	
43	5	4	Alfredo Jacobo	Mexico	1:04.67	
44	5	8	Iván Rodríguez Mesa	Panama	1:04.68	
45	4	8	Joe Kyong-fan	South Korea	1:04.71	
46	5	7	Aliaksandr Hukau	Belarus	1:04.96	
47	3	5	Wickus Nienaber	Swaziland	1:04.98	
48	2	4	Juan José Madrigal	Costa Rica	1:05.14	NR
49	3	2	Jorg Lindemeier	Namibia	1:05.25	
50	3	3	Matthew Kwok Hon Ming	Hong Kong	1:05.28	
51	2	3	Sylvain Fauré	Monaco	1:05.51	
52	4	4	Hjalti Gudmundsson	Iceland	1:05.55	
53	5	1	Sergio Andres Ferreyra	Argentina	1:05.75	
54	3	7	Aleksandr Savitsky	Kazakhstan	1:05.95	
55	2	6	Jean Luc Razakarivony	Madagascar	1:05.97	
56	2	5	Ahmed Al-Kudmani	Saudi Arabia	1:06.07	
57	4	1	Daniel Liew	Singapore	1:06.41	
58	3	8	Krasimir Zahov	Bulgaria	1:07.09	
59	4	6	Yevgeny Petrashov	Kyrgyzstan	1:07.32	
60	3	6	Hakan Kiper	Turkey	1:07.46	
61	1	3	Antonio Leon Candia	Paraguay	1:08.12	NR
62	2	2	Malick Fall	Senegal	1:08.60	
63	1	5	Kieran Chan	Papua New Guinea	1:13.34	
64	2	7	Karar Samedul Islam	Bangladesh	1:14.93	
65	1	4	Joe Atuhaire	Uganda	1:22.35	
	2	1	Facinet Bangoura	Guinea	DSQ	

=== Semifinals ===
==== Semifinal 1 ====
Rank	Lane	Name	Nationality	Time	Notes
1	2	Roman Sloudnov	Russia	1:01.15	Q
2	4	Daniel Málek	Czech Republic	1:01.60	Q
3	3	Morgan Knabe	Canada	1:01.70	Q
4	8	Remo Lütolf	Switzerland	1:01.81	Q, NR
5	5	Károly Güttler	Hungary	1:01.83	
6	7	Jarno Pihlava	Finland	1:01.92	
7	6	Marcel Wouda	Netherlands	1:01.94	NR
8	1	Hugues Duboscq	France	1:02.89	

==== Semifinal 2 ====
Rank	Lane	Name	Nationality	Time	Notes
1	4	Domenico Fioravanti	Italy	1:00.84	Q, NR
2	5	Ed Moses	United States	1:01.22	Q
3	3	Kosuke Kitajima	Japan	1:01.31	Q, AS
4	7	Brett Petersen	South Africa	1:01.42	Q, AF
5	6	Dmitry Komornikov	Russia	1:01.88	
6	2	Jens Kruppa	Germany	1:01.92	
7	8	Darren Mew	Great Britain	1:01.98	
8	1	Oleg Lisogor	Ukraine	1:02.00	

=== Final ===
Rank	Lane	Name	Nationality	Time	Notes
1st place, gold medalist(s)	4	Domenico Fioravanti	Italy	1:00.46	OR
2nd place, silver medalist(s)	3	Ed Moses	United States	1:00.73	
3rd place, bronze medalist(s)	5	Roman Sloudnov	Russia	1:00.91	
4	6	Kosuke Kitajima	Japan	1:01.34	
5	7	Daniel Málek	Czech Republic	1:01.50	NR
6	1	Morgan Knabe	Canada	1:01.58	NR
7	2	Brett Petersen	South Africa	1:01.63	
8	8	Remo Lütolf	Switzerland	1:01.88	
