= Swimming at the 2006 Central American and Caribbean Games – Men's 100 metre breaststroke =

The Men's 100m Breaststroke event at the 2006 Central American and Caribbean Games occurred on Monday, July 17, 2006, at the S.U. Pedro de Heredia Aquatic Complex in Cartagena, Colombia.

== Records ==
World Record	Brendan Hansen (USA)	59.30	2004-07-11	(United States) Long Beach, California
CAC Record	Mario González (CUB)	1:03.27	1993-11-20	Ponce, Puerto Rico

== Results ==
=== Final ===
Place	Swimmer	Country	Time	Note
1	Alfredo Jacobo	Mexico	1:03.62	
2	Bradley Ally	Barbados	1:04.50	
3	Andrei Cross	Barbados	1:05.33	
4	Arsenio López	Puerto Rico	1:05.80	
5	Alvaro Fortuny	Guatemala	1:06.00	
5	Alejandro Jacobo	Mexico	1:06.00	
7	Diego Bonilla	Colombia	1:07.54	
8	Édgar Crespo	Panama	1:08.06	

=== Preliminaries ===
Rank	Swimmer	Country	Time	Note
1	Alfredo Jacobo	Mexico	1:03.99	Q
2	Alvaro Fortuny	Guatemala	1:05.15	Q
3	Andrei Cross	Barbados	1:05.72	Q
4	Édgar Crespo	Panama	1:06.07	Q
5	Alejandro Jacobo	Mexico	1:06.14	Q
6	Arsenio López	Puerto Rico	1:06.17	Q
7	Diego Bonilla	Colombia	1:06.46	Q
8	Bradley Ally	Barbados	1:06.50	Q
9	Alfonso Espinosa	Dominican Republic	1:06.67	
10	Rohan Ian Pinto Ramnarine	Venezuela	1:07.13	
11	Leopoldo Jose Andara Gonzalez	Venezuela	1:07.31	
12	Dominic Lee	Jamaica	1:07.36	
13	Sergio Meléndez	El Salvador	1:07.38	
14	Juan Alberto Guerra Quiñonez	El Salvador	1:07.42	
15	Brad Hamilton	Jamaica	1:08.04	
16	Josh Laban	Virgin Islands	1:08.81	
17	Onan Thom	Guyana	1:09.11	
18	Kevin Hensley	Virgin Islands	1:09.19	
19	Cristian Orjuela	Colombia	1:09.75	
20	Joel Refos	Suriname	1:11.65	
21	Travano McPhee	Bahamas	1:11.92	
--	Rodion Davelaar	Netherlands Antilles	DNS	
