= Swimming at the 2002 Commonwealth Games – Men's 50 metre breaststroke =

Men's 50 metre breaststroke at the 2002 Commonwealth Games
- Venue: Manchester Aquatics Centre
- Date: August 2, 2002 August 3, 2002
- Competitors: 19 from 14 nations
- Winning time: 27.72

Medalists
gold medal	James Gibson	England
silver medal	Adam Whitehead	England
bronze medal	Darren Mew	England

The Men's 50 metre breaststroke event at the 2002 Commonwealth Games took place between 2 August 2002 and 3 August 2002 at Manchester Aquatics Centre.

== Schedule ==
All times are Coordinated Universal Time (UTC)

Date	Time	Event
Friday, 2 August 2002	10:00	Heat 1
Friday, 2 August 2002	10:03	Heat 2
Friday, 2 August 2002	10:06	Heat 3
Friday, 2 August 2002	19:06	Semifinal 1
Friday, 2 August 2002	19:09	Semifinal 2
Saturday, 3 August 2002	19:16	Final

== Records ==
Prior to the competition, the existing world and championship records were as follows.

	Name	Nation	Time	Location	Date
World record	Ed Moses	United States	27.39	Austin	31 March 2001
Games record	First time held				

The following new records were set during this competition.

Date	Event	Name	Nation	Time	Record
2 August	Heats	Morgan Knabe	Canada	28.95	GR
2 August	Heats	James Gibson	England	28.42	GR
2 August	Heats	Darren Mew	England	27.99	GR
2 August	Semifinals	James Gibson	England	27.56	GR

== Results ==
=== Heats ===
The heats were held the morning session on 2 August.

Rank	Heat	Lane	Name	Nationality	Time	Notes
1	3	4	Darren Mew	England	27.99	Q GR
2	2	4	James Gibson	England	28.42	Q
3	3	5	Adam Whitehead	England	28.64	Q
4	1	4	Morgan Knabe	Canada	28.95	Q
5	2	5	Brett Petersen	South Africa	29.06	Q
6	3	3	Robert van der Zant	Australia	29.55	Q
7	1	5	Jim Piper	Australia	29.96	Q
8	2	3	Andrei Cross	Barbados	30.07	Q
9	3	1	Wickus Nienaber	Swaziland	30.54	Q
10	1	6	Travano McPhee	Bahamas	31.05	Q
11	1	3	Dave Batty	Isle of Man	31.25	Q
12	2	6	Eric Williams	Nigeria	31.37	Q
13	3	6	Afolabi Adeleke-Adedoyin	Nigeria	31.40	Q
14	3	2	Graham Smith	Bermuda	31.60	Q
15	2	2	Mohammad Niaz Ali	Bangladesh	32.09	Q
16	1	2	Jamie Zammitt	Gibraltar	32.98	Q
17	2	7	Chisela Kanchela	Zambia	33.07	
18	3	7	Gavin Santos	Gibraltar	34.26	
	1	7	Joel Kisuule	Uganda	Disqualified	

=== Semifinals ===
The semifinals were held the evening session on 2 August.

Rank	Heat	Lane	Name	Nationality	Time	Notes
1	1	4	James Gibson	England	27.56	Q GR
2	2	4	Darren Mew	England	27.57	Q
3	1	5	Morgan Knabe	Canada	28.36	Q
4	2	5	Adam Whitehead	England	28.48	Q
5	2	3	Brett Petersen	South Africa	28.62	Q
6	1	3	Robert van der Zant	Australia	28.93	Q WD
7	1	6	Andrei Cross	Barbados	29.96	Q
8	2	6	Jim Piper	Australia	30.03	Q
9	2	2	Wickus Nienaber	Swaziland	30.24	Q
10	1	2	Travano McPhee	Bahamas	30.90	
11	2	7	Dave Batty	Isle of Man	31.24	
12	2	1	Afolabi Adeleke-Adedoyin	Nigeria	31.54	
12	1	1	Graham Smith	Bermuda	31.54	
14	1	7	Eric Williams	Nigeria	31.67	
15	2	8	Mohammad Niaz Ali	Bangladesh	32.13	
16	1	8	Jamie Zammitt	Gibraltar	32.69	

=== Final ===
The final were held the evening session on 3 August.

Rank	Lane	Name	Nationality	Time	Notes
1st place, gold medalist(s)	4	James Gibson	England	27.72	
2nd place, silver medalist(s)	6	Adam Whitehead	England	27.79	
3rd place, bronze medalist(s)	5	Darren Mew	England	27.80	
4	2	Brett Petersen	South Africa	28.64	
5	3	Morgan Knabe	Canada	28.67	
6	7	Andrei Cross	Barbados	29.73	
7	8	Wickus Nienaber	Swaziland	30.38	
8	1	Jim Piper	Australia	30.45	
