= Swimming at the 2002 Commonwealth Games – Men's 100 metre breaststroke =

Men's 100 metre breaststroke at the 2002 Commonwealth Games
- Venue: Manchester Aquatics Centre
- Date: July 31, 2002 August 1, 2002
- Competitors: 26 from 16 nations
- Winning time: 1:01.13

Medalists
gold medal	Adam Whitehead	England
silver medal	Morgan Knabe	Canada
bronze medal	James Gibson	England

The Men's 100 metre breaststroke event at the 2002 Commonwealth Games took place between 31 July 2002 and 1 August 2002 at Manchester Aquatics Centre. The event was won by Adam Whitehead of England who also set a games record in the semifinals.

== Schedule ==
All times are Coordinated Universal Time (UTC)

Date	Time	Event
Wednesday, 31 July 2002	10:24	Heat 1
Wednesday, 31 July 2002	10:27	Heat 2
Wednesday, 31 July 2002	10:30	Heat 3
Wednesday, 31 July 2002	10:33	Heat 4
Wednesday, 31 July 2002	19:58	Semifinal 1
Wednesday, 31 July 2002	20:05	Semifinal 2
Thursday, 1 August 2002	20:20	Final

== Records ==
Prior to the competition, the existing world and championship records were as follows.

	Name	Nation	Time	Location	Date
World record	Roman Sludnov	Russia	59.94	Fukuoka	23 July 2001
Games record	Adrian Moorhouse	England	1:01.49	Auckland	25 January 1990

The following new records were set during this competition.

Date	Event	Name	Nation	Time	Record
31 July	Semifinals	Adam Whitehead	England	1:01.05	GR

== Results ==
=== Heats ===
The heats were held the morning session on 31 July.

Rank	Heat	Lane	Name	Nationality	Time	Notes
1	3	4	Morgan Knabe	Canada	1:01.79	Q
2	3	5	Adam Whitehead	England	1:02.03	Q
3	4	6	Terence Parkin	South Africa	1:02.69	Q
3	3	6	Michael Brown	Canada	1:02.69	Q
5	3	2	Ian Edmond	Scotland	1:02.79	Q
6	4	5	Jim Piper	Australia	1:02.88	Q
7	4	4	James Gibson	England	1:02.93	Q
8	2	5	Brett Petersen	South Africa	1:03.25	Q
9	4	3	Andrew Bree	Northern Ireland	1:03.27	Q
10	2	3	Regan Harrison	Australia	1:03.31	Q
11	2	4	Darren Mew	England	1:03.34	Q
12	3	3	Justin Norris	Australia	1:03.43	Q
13	2	6	John Stamhuis	Canada	1:04.52	Q
14	4	2	Michael Williamson	Northern Ireland	1:04.70	Q
15	1	3	Wickus Nienaber	Swaziland	1:05.82	Q
16	4	7	Andrei Cross	Barbados	1:06.23	Q
17	2	2	Graham Smith	Bermuda	1:08.32	
18	2	1	Travano McPhee	Bahamas	1:09.29	
19	1	5	Conrad Francis	Sri Lanka	1:10.46	
20	4	8	Eric Williams	Nigeria	1:10.89	
21	3	7	Karar Samedul Islam	Bangladesh	1:10.97	
22	3	1	Gavin Santos	Gibraltar	1:13.27	
23	3	8	Chisela Kanchela	Zambia	1:13.32	
24	1	4	Rory Buck	Malawi	1:16.02	
	2	7	Jamie Zammitt	Gibraltar	Disqualified	
	4	1	Mohammad Niaz Ali	Bangladesh	Disqualified	

=== Semifinals ===
The semifinals were held the evening session on 31 July.

Rank	Heat	Lane	Name	Nationality	Time	Notes
1	1	4	Adam Whitehead	England	1:01.05	Q, GR
2	2	7	Darren Mew	England	1:01.66	Q
3	2	6	James Gibson	England	1:01.82	Q
4	2	4	Morgan Knabe	Canada	1:02.00	Q
5	1	6	Brett Petersen	South Africa	1:02.33	Q
6	2	5	Terence Parkin	South Africa	1:02.62	Q
7	1	3	Jim Piper	Australia	1:02.68	Q
8	1	5	Michael Brown	Canada	1:02.70	Q
9	1	2	Regan Harrison	Australia	1:02.81	
10	2	3	Ian Edmond	Scotland	1:02.94	
11	1	7	Justin Norris	Australia	1:03.34	
12	2	2	Andrew Bree	Northern Ireland	1:03.45	
13	2	1	John Stamhuis	Canada	1:04.44	
14	1	1	Michael Williamson	Northern Ireland	1:04.90	
15	2	8	Wickus Nienaber	Swaziland	1:05.16	
16	1	8	Andrei Cross	Barbados	1:06.07	

=== Final ===
The final were held the evening session on 1 August.

Rank	Lane	Name	Nationality	Time	Notes
1st place, gold medalist(s)	4	Adam Whitehead	England	1:01.13	
2nd place, silver medalist(s)	6	Morgan Knabe	Canada	1:01.23	
3rd place, bronze medalist(s)	3	James Gibson	England	1:01.64	
4	5	Darren Mew	England	1:01.87	
5	2	Brett Petersen	South Africa	1:02.14	
6	8	Michael Brown	Canada	1:02.58	
7	1	Jim Piper	Australia	1:02.68	
8	7	Terence Parkin	South Africa	1:02.74	
