= Swimming at the 2006 Central American and Caribbean Games – Men's 50 metre breaststroke =

The men's 50m Breaststroke event at the 2006 Central American and Caribbean Games occurred on Friday, July 22, 2006, at the S.U. Pedro de Heredia Aquatic Complex in Cartagena, Colombia.

== Records ==
World Record	Oleg Lisogor (UKR)	27.18	2002-08-02	Berlin, Germany
CAC Record	—	—	—	—

== Results ==
=== Final ===
Place	Swimmer	Country	Time	Note
1	Alfredo Jacobo	Mexico	28.85	
2	Arsenio López	Puerto Rico	29.00	
3	Édgar Crespo	Panama	29.11	
4	Alvaro Fortuny	Guatemala	29.34	
5	Andrei Cross	Barbados	29.60	
6	Alfonso Espinosa	Dominican Republic	30.03	
7	Terrence Haynes	Barbados	30.26	
8	Sergio Meléndez	El Salvador	30.72	

=== Preliminaries ===
Rank	Swimmer	Country	Time	Note
1	Alfredo Jacobo	Mexico	28.79	Q, GR
2	Arsenio López	Puerto Rico	29.45	Q
3	Édgar Crespo	Panama	29.46	Q
4	Alvaro Fortuny	Guatemala	29.52	Q
5	Andrei Cross	Barbados	29.62	Q
6	Alfonso Espinosa	Dominican Republic	29.76	Q
7	Terrence Haynes	Barbados	30.12	Q
8	Sergio Meléndez	El Salvador	30.29	Q
9	Diego Bonilla	Colombia	30.37	
10	Alejandro Jacobo	Mexico	30.38	
11	Rohan Pinto	Venezuela	30.52	
12	Kevin Hensley	Virgin Islands	30.55	
12	Brad Hamilton	Jamaica	30.55	
12	Onan Orlando Thom	Guyana	30.55	
15	Travano McPhee	Bahamas	30.92	
16	Dominic Lee	Jamaica	30.99	
17	Joel Refos	Suriname	31.39	
18	Cristian Orjuela	Colombia	32.22	
19	Stephenson Wallace	Saint Vincent and the Grenadines	37.40	
--	Kian Ashby	Grenada	DNS	
--	Rodion Davelaar	Netherlands Antilles	DNS	
