= Pat Calhoun =

American swimmer (born 1981)

Personal information
- Full name: Patrick Maloney Calhoun
- Nickname: "Patty”
- National team: United States
- Born: June 16, 1981 (age 45) Seymour, Indiana, U.S.
- Height: 6 ft 0 in (1.83 m)
- Weight: 185 lb (84 kg)
- Spouse: Anna Ekwurtzel (2009)
- Children: 2

Sport
- Sport: Swimming
- Strokes: Breaststroke
- Club: Seymour Swimming Club
- College team: Auburn University (2003)
- Coach: Dave Boggs (Seymour High); David Marsh (Auburn)

Patrick Maloney Calhoun (born June 16, 1981) is an American former competitive swimmer who competed for Auburn University and participated in the men's 100-meter breaststroke at the 2000 Summer Olympics in Sydney, Australia. Though not expected by many to make the U.S. Olympic team, at the age of 19 he swam an exceptional 1:01.19 for the 100-meter breaststroke at the 2000 Olympic trials in Indianapolis, placing second, and ranking him as the third fastest 100-meter breaststroke swimmer in the world that year.

== Early life and swimming ==
Calhoun was born June 16, 1981, in the small town of Seymour, Indiana, the second of five children, to parents Shara, a Nurse, and Dr. Charles Calhoun. The couple met at the Indiana University Medical Center during Charles's residency, and later moved to Seymour in 1979.

Active in many sports in his youth, Calhoun tried baseball, flag football and basketball, but eventually began swimming with the Seymour Swimming Club. Pat attended his first meet in Elementary School around the age of eight, and soon began training year round, attending summer swim camps at Indiana University and Fort Lauderdale's Pine Crest School, an outstanding swim program. He left swimming for his High School basketball in eighth grade, but soon returned to the sport where he had shown early promise.

== Seymour High School ==
Pat attended Seymour High School, where he trained and competed under Coach Dave Boggs, his former coach at the Seymour Swimming Club. He wasn't considered a top athletic prospect, standing barely five feet as a High School Freshman, but he improved consistently as a swimmer. As a Sophomore, he won 10 consecutive 100 breaststroke races in 10 meets, and won the event in the sectional title. Recognized for his efforts by his teammates, he was voted Most Valuable Player in three years as an upperclassman. In his Junior year, he swam a 58.48 for the 100-yard breaststroke, setting a new School and conference record. He made the State Championships in his Sophomore, Junior, and Senior years, where he competed at the Indiana University Natatorium, becoming very familiar with the pool where he would later compete in the 2000 Olympic trials. By his Senior year, he reached six feet with a growth spurt, won all of his High School breaststroke competitions, and for the first time claimed the Indiana 100-yard breaststroke State title with a 56.67, just short of the state record.

In competition highlights, Calhoun was the US Junior Champion at Buffalo, New York in the 100-yard breaststroke in 1999 with a noteworthy time of 55:69, helping him improve his prospect for College recruiters. In 2000, he served as a National Team member for the U.S. Junior team.

== 2000 Sydney Olympics ==
Calhoun qualified for the U.S. Olympic trials at Long Island, New York's Senior Nationals with a time of 1:04.67 in the 100-meter breaststroke, just barely making the trials by an .02 second margin. Later, at the early August 2000 U.S. Olympic trials at the Indiana University Natatorium in Indianapolis, Calhoun made the team unexpectedly with an exceptional time of 1:01.19 in the 100-meter breaststroke, placing second to 2000 Olympic silver medalist Ed Moses. Calhoun's time was notably the third fastest in the world that year and a full three seconds under his Olympic trials qualifying time. His hometown of Seymour, Indiana organized a parade in his honor when he returned from the trials, and collected funds to help send him to Sydney. Calhoun's 200-meter breaststroke swim at the Indianapolis trials went less well, clocking a 2:29.33, and placing him 70th among the other trial competitors. In late August, he flew to Pasadena, California, to work out for a few weeks with the U.S. Olympic team at the Rose Bowl Aquatics Center. Mark Schubert was the Head Men's Olympic swim team coach for 2000, but Calhoun's former Coach Dave Boggs would make the trip to Sydney as well.

At the mid-September 2000 Summer Olympics in Sydney, Australia, Calhoun competed in the preliminary heats of the men's 100-meter breaststroke event and posted a time of 1:03.03, placing 25th overall. Though considerably slower than expected, his time was only half a second over the time required to make the semi-final round of 16 swimmers. Calhoun was disappointed in his performance but honored to represent the U.S. team. He believed his stroke technique was slightly impaired during his preliminary heat, and that his long taper after the trials may have affected his performance. The favorites for the event were Roman Sludnov of Russia and Ed Moses of the U.S. team. Domenico Fioravanti of Italy set the best times in the Olympic qualifying rounds, however, and had a great race breaking the Olympic record with a time of 1:00.46 and taking the gold medal. American Ed Moses took the silver medal with a 1:00.73, and Roman Sludnov of Russia took the bronze with a time of 1:00.91. Calhoun's time was just over 2 seconds away from contending for the bronze medal. With his outstanding time in the Olympic trials in the 100-meter breaststroke, Calhoun was originally scheduled to swim the breaststroke leg in the Men's 4x100 Medley Relay, but Ed Moses swam in his place. The 4x100 Medley relay team later won the gold medal on one of the last days of the swimming competition.

== Auburn University ==
Beginning in the Fall of 1999, Calhoun attended Auburn University where he swam for Hall of Fame Coach David Marsh. He would graduate Auburn in 2003 with degrees in Economics and Business. While at Auburn, he captured three Southeastern Conference titles in the 100 breaststroke, his signature event. Though he had not yet started at Auburn, he attended their NCAA National Championship in 1999 in Indianapolis, taking first over a strong second place team from Stanford University. In his Freshman year, Calhoun swam a 52.68 in the 100-yard breast, and captured his first Southeastern Conference title. The time broke the Auburn pool record and was the third fastest in the history of the event. At the 2001 SEC Championships, a year after his impressive victory as a Freshman, Calhoun finished third in the 100 breaststroke with a 53.27. Auburn placed second at the NCAA Championships in 2000, but did not win a national championship during Calhoun's tenure with the team. Calhoun improved in his Junior year at Auburn, winning the Southeastern Conference 100 breaststroke title with a pool record time of 53.47.

At the NCAA National Championships in the 100-meter breaststroke, he placed fifth in 2000, and fourth in 2001.

In his Senior year, he won his third Southeastern Conference title in the 100 breaststroke, with a time of 52.85. As acting team Captain, Calhoun gave up his scholarship so it could be given to an incoming team member, assisted with recruiting and coaching and tried to improve team moral. According to Coach Dave Marsh, showing remarkable success in the collegiate ranks, during Calhoun's tenure with Auburn, the swim team won every dual meet, and every conference meet for four successive years.

In Calhoun's Senior year, as acting Captain, Auburn won the 2003 NCAA Championship in Austin, Texas against the runner-up University of Texas Longhorns by a considerable 200 points. Having won a national championship, Calhoun decided not to train for the 2004 Olympics, as he felt his motivation would be lacking without a team motivating his efforts.

After graduating Auburn, he began a position in Atlanta, changing positions in 2012, and again in 2015 after a move to Brentwood, Tennessee. In Brentwood, he worked as a Vice=President for Concentric Storage Solutions, a corporation that makes systems for distribution centers and warehouses.

Calhoun married Anna Ekwurtzel, an Auburn graduate, in 2009. As of 2024, they had one son and one daughter.

=== Honors ===
Calhoun became a member of the Auburn Swimming and Diving Hall of Fame in 2006, and was made a member of the Seymour High School Athletic Hall of Fame in 2019. He is also an inductee of the “Wall of Fame” at the IU Natatorium with as is his Coach Dave Boggs.

== See also ==
- List of Auburn University people
- List of Olympic medalists in swimming (men)
