= Daniel Liew =

Singaporean swimmer (born 1981)

Personal information
- Full name: Liew Yao Xiang
- National team: Singapore
- Born: 1 May 1981 (age 45)
- Height: 1.70 m (5 ft 7 in)
- Weight: 68 kg (150 lb)

Sport
- Sport: Swimming
- Strokes: Breaststroke
- Club: Chinese Swimming Club
Medal record
Men's swimming
Representing Singapore
Southeast Asian Games
Silver medal – second place	1999 Brunei	100 m breaststroke

Daniel Liew Yao Xiang (Liew Yao Xiang, born 1 May 1981) is a former Singaporean swimmer, who specialized in breaststroke events. During his sporting career, Liew held a Singaporean record in the medley relay (3:51.16) from the 2001 Southeast Asian Games, and later represented Singapore at the 2000 Summer Olympics. He also played for the Chinese Swimming Club before entering the national team.

Liew competed only in the men's 100 m breaststroke at the 2000 Summer Olympics in Sydney. After winning a silver medal from the Southeast Asian Games in Brunei a year earlier, his entry time of 1:04.95 was officially accredited under a FINA B-standard. He challenged seven other swimmers in heat four, including two-time Olympians Valērijs Kalmikovs of Latvia and Arsenio López of Puerto Rico. Coming from second on the initial length, he faded down the stretch with a poor swim to a seventh seed in 1:06.41, almost 1.5 seconds below his entry standard. Liew failed to advance into the semifinals, as he placed fifty-seventh overall on the first day of prelims.
