= Nikola Savčić =

Serbian swimmer

Personal information
- Full name: Nikola Savčić
- National team: Yugoslavia
- Born: 13 March 1974 (age 52) Belgrade, SR Serbia, SFR Yugoslavia
- Height: 1.86 m (6 ft 1 in)
- Weight: 89 kg (196 lb)

Sport
- Sport: Swimming
- Strokes: Breaststroke
- Club: PK April 11

Nikola Savčić (born March 13, 1974) is a Serbian former swimmer, who specialized in breaststroke events. He held numerous Yugoslav records in a sprint breaststroke double, and later represented Yugoslavia at the 2000 Summer Olympics. Savcic is also a resident athlete for PK April 11 in Belgrade, and a member of Yugoslav national swimming team since 1990.

Savcic swam only in the 100 m breaststroke, as a member of the former Yugoslav squad, at the 2000 Summer Olympics in Sydney. He achieved a FINA B-standard entry time of 1:04.75 from the Akropolis International Meet in Athens. He challenged seven other swimmers in heat four, including two-time Olympians Valērijs Kalmikovs of Latvia and Arsenio López of Puerto Rico. He raced to the fourth seed by a 0.62-second deficit behind joint winners Kalmikovs and Lopez in 1:04.64, worthy enough for a Yugoslav record. Savcic failed to advance into the semifinals, as he placed forty-second overall on the first day of prelims.

Since 2001, Savcic currently resides in the United States, where he works as part of an age group coaching staff for the Lakeridge Swim Team in Reno, Nevada. He is currently practicing as a DVM.
