= Pāvels Murāns =

Latvian swimmer (born 1985)

Personal information
- Full name: Pāvels Murāns
- National team: Latvia
- Born: 19 June 1985 (age 41) Rīga, Latvian SSR, Soviet Union
- Height: 1.84 m (6 ft 0 in)
- Weight: 76 kg (168 lb)

Sport
- Sport: Swimming
- Strokes: Breaststroke
- Club: Rīga Swimming School
- Coach: Jeļena Solovjova

Pāvels Murāns (born June 19, 1985) is a Latvian former swimmer, who specialized in breaststroke events. He is a member of Rīga Swimming School, and is coached and trained by Jeļena Solovjova. Murans also had an opportunity to represent Latvia at the 2004 Summer Olympics, finishing fifty-first in the 100-metre breaststroke.

Murans qualified for the men's 100 m breaststroke at the 2004 Summer Olympics in Athens, by eclipsing a FINA B-standard entry time of 1:04.95 from the Croatian Open Championships in Rijeka. He challenged seven other swimmers on the second heat, including three-time Olympians Jean Luc Razakarivony of Madagascar and Yevgeny Petrashov of Kyrgyzstan. He cruised to fifth place by eight hundredths of a second (0.08) behind Raphael Matthew Chua of the Philippines in 1:06.45. Murans failed to advance into the semifinals, as he placed fifty-first overall on the first day of preliminaries.
