= Joe Atuhaire =

Ugandan swimmer

Personal information
- Full name: Joe Atuhaire
- National team: Uganda
- Born: 15 May 1978 (age 48) Kampala, Uganda
- Height: 1.68 m (5 ft 6 in)
- Weight: 66 kg (146 lb)

Sport
- Sport: Swimming
- Strokes: Breaststroke

Joe Atuhaire (born May 15, 1978) is a Ugandan former swimmer, who specialized in breaststroke events. He represented Uganda at the 2000 Summer Olympics, finishing sixty-fifth in the 100 m breaststroke.

Shortly after the Games, Atuhaire's swimming career was overshadowed with criminal charges when he was arrested and charged with rape, and held for a month before the charges were dropped.

== Career ==
Atuhaire competed for Uganda in the men's 100 m breaststroke at the 2000 Summer Olympics in Sydney. He received a Universality place from FINA, in an entry time of 1:10.00. He participated in heat one against two other swimmers, Antonio Leon of Paraguay and Kieran Chan of Papua New Guinea. Atuhaire rounded out a small field of three to last place in a time of 1:22.35, the slowest to be recorded in the heats by over seven seconds. Facinet Bangoura recorded an even slower time in the following heat, but was disqualified. Atuhaire failed to advance into the semifinals, as he placed sixty-fifth overall on the first day of prelims, more than 21 seconds behind the top-seeded swimmer and eventual Olympic champion Domenico Fioravanti of Italy.

Four days after the swimming competition, while still in Sydney, Atuhaire was arrested and charged with raping a seventeen-year-old girl near the main Olympic athletes' village. The charges were later dropped without explanation.

New Vision, a major newspaper in Uganda, used the case to complain that lack of discipline is "the single big reason why our sportsmen have failed to achieve any recognisable success. Sportsmen are the country's ambassadors internationally, and it is about time they behaved." The paper went on to complain that the Ugandan Olympic panel selects "tourist friendly" athletes who are "not genuine sportsmen". New Vision later commented that the case could have broader negative implications toward the country's marketability. The case was used as a warning for future Ugandan athletes traveling to Australia for the 2006 Commonwealth Games.

Following the Games, Atuhaire dominated the national trials in July 2001, winning three races. Later that year, he again represented Uganda at the FINA World Championships in the 50 metre freestyle event. There, he finished eighty-third out of 92 entrants, a little more than 5 and half seconds behind the winner.

In 2002, he traveled to Japan for training, without the assistance of his national swimming federation. He was reported to be unable to afford the return trip to attend the trials to the 2002 Commonwealth Games.

After working in Japan as a car dealer, in 2005 he began efforts to build an Olympic swimming pool in Kampala in order to help other athletes gain the times and experience to qualify to future high level competition.
