= Sylvain Fauré =

Monegasque swimmer (born 1978)

Sylvain FAURE
Personal information
- Full name: Sylvain FAURE
- National team: Monaco
- Born: 3 November 1978 (age 47) Monte Carlo, Monaco
- Height: 1.97 m (6 ft 6 in)
- Weight: 80 kg (176 lb)

Sport
- Sport: Swimming
- Strokes: Breaststroke

Sylvain Faure (born November 3, 1978) is a Monegasque former swimmer, who specialized in breaststroke events. Faure competed only in the men's 100 m breaststroke at the 2000 Summer Olympics in Sydney. He received a Universality place from FINA, in an entry time of 1:06.50. He challenged six other swimmers in heat two, including two-time Olympians Juan José Madrigal of Costa Rica and Jean Luc Razakarivony of Madagascar. Faure pulled away from the field on the first length, but came up short to second place in a national record of 1:05.51, just 0.37 seconds behind leader Madrigal. Faure failed to advance into the semifinals, as he placed fifty-first overall on the first day of prelims.
