= Hjalti Guðmundsson =

Icelandic swimmer (born 1978)

Personal information
- Full name: Hjalti Guðmundsson
- National team: Iceland
- Born: 20 March 1978 (age 48) Reykjavík, Iceland
- Height: 1.83 m (6 ft 0 in)
- Weight: 75 kg (165 lb)

Sport
- Sport: Swimming
- Strokes: Breaststroke
- Club: Sundfélag Hafnarfjarðar

Hjalti Guðmundsson (born 20 March 1978) is an Icelandic former swimmer, who specialized in breaststroke events. During his sporting career, Gudmundsson swam for the club Sundfélag Hafnarfjarðar, and later represented Iceland at the 2000 Summer Olympics.

Gudmunsson competed in the men's 100 m breaststroke at the 2000 Summer Olympics in Sydney. He achieved a FINA B-cut of 1:04.57 from the Mare Nostrum meet in Barcelona, Spain. He challenged seven other swimmers in heat four, including two-time Olympians Valērijs Kalmikovs of Latvia and Arsenio López of Puerto Rico. Entering the race with a fastest-seeded time, he faded down the stretch to touch the wall for a sixth spot in 1:05.55, a 1.5-second deficit from joint leaders Kalmikovs and Lopez (a matching time of 1:04.02). Gudmundsson placed fifty-second overall on the first day of prelims.
