= Krasimir Zahov =

Bulgarian swimmer

Personal information
- Full name: Krasimir Zahov
- Nickname: Krasi
- National team: Bulgaria
- Born: 2 December 1978 (age 47) Pazardzhik, Bulgaria
- Height: 1.76 m (5 ft 9 in)
- Weight: 72 kg (159 lb)

Sport
- Sport: Swimming
- Strokes: Breaststroke
- Club: Slavia Swimming Club
- Coach: Lazar Kamenov

Krasimir Zahov (Bulgarian: Красимир Захов) (born 2 December 1978) is a Bulgarian former swimmer, who specialized in breaststroke events. He represented his nation Bulgaria at the 2000 Summer Olympics, and also held Bulgarian records in the 50 and 200 m breaststroke, until they were eventually broken by Mihail Alexandrov. Before he retired from swimming in 2001, Zahov played and trained for Slavia Swimming Club in Sofia under his personal coach Lazar Kamenov.

Zahov competed only in the men's 100 m breaststroke at the 2000 Summer Olympics in Sydney. He achieved a FINA B-cut of 1:05.60 from the European Championships in Helsinki, Finland . He challenged seven other swimmers in heat three, including three-time Olympian Jorg Lindemeier of Namibia. He saved a seventh spot over Turkey's Hakan Kiper by 0.37 of a second in 1:07.09. Zahov failed to advance into the semifinals, as he placed fifty-eighth overall on the first day of prelims.

Zahov is currently working as a head coach for Pluven Sprint Swimming Club in Sofia.
