= Petrashov =

Petrashov (masculine), Petrashova (feminine) is a Russian-language patronymic surname derived from the nickname or given name Petrash. Notable people with this surname include:

- Denis Petrashov (born 2000), Kyrgyzstani swimmer
- Yevgeny Petrashov (born 1974), Kyrgyz swimmer
