= Swimming at the 2006 Central American and Caribbean Games – Men's 200 metre breaststroke =

The men's 200 m Breaststroke event at the 2006 Central American and Caribbean Games occurred on Tuesday, July 18, 2006 at the S.U. Pedro de Heredia Aquatic Complex in Cartagena, Colombia.

== Records ==
World Record	Brendan Hansen (USA)	2:09.04	2004-07-11	(United States) Long Beach, CA, USA
CAC Record	Mario González (CUB)	2:17.76	1993-11-23	(Puerto Rico) Ponce

== Results ==
=== Final ===
Place	Swimmer	Country	Time	Note
1	Bradley Ally	Barbados	2:19.28	
2	Alfredo Jacobo	Mexico	2:19.82	
3	Alejandro Jacobo	Mexico	2:21.33	
4	Diego Bonilla	Colombia	2:22.50	
5	Leopoldo Jose Andara Gonzalez	Venezuela	2:23.10	
6	Juan Alberto Guerra Quiñonez	El Salvador	2:23.73	
7	Kevin Hensley	Virgin Islands	2:27.85	
8	Cristian Orjuela	Colombia	2:31.49	

=== Preliminaries ===
Rank	Swimmer	Country	Time	Note
1	Diego Bonilla	Colombia	2:23.16	Q
2	Alejandro Jacobo	Mexico	2:23.21	Q
3	Bradley Ally	Barbados	2:23.48	Q
4	Alfredo Jacobo	Mexico	2:24.15	Q
5	Juan Alberto Guerra Quiñonez	El Salvador	2:24.19	Q
5	Leopoldo Jose Andara Gonzalez	Venezuela	2:24.19	Q
7	Kevin Hensley	Virgin Islands	2:28.17	Q
8	Cristian Orjuela	Colombia	2:28.47	Q
9	Alfonso Espinosa	Dominican Republic	2:29.94	
10	Dominic Lee	Jamaica	2:31.24	
11	Rohan Ian Pinto Ramnarine	Venezuela	2:31.76	
12	Joel Refos	Suriname	2:38.67	
