= Timmy Chua =

Filipino swimmer (born 1982)

Personal information
- Full name: Raphael Matthew San Miguel Chua
- Nickname: Timmy
- National team: Philippines
- Born: October 5, 1982 (age 43)
- Height: 1.80 m (5 ft 11 in)
- Weight: 70 kg (154 lb)

Sport
- Sport: Swimming
- Strokes: Breaststroke
- Club: Philippine Columbian Association
- College team: UP Fighting Maroons
- Coach: Ryuzo Ishikawa
Medal record
Men's swimming
Representing the Philippines
Southeast Asian Games
Bronze medal – third place	2005 Manila	100 m breaststroke
Bronze medal – third place	2005 Manila	4×100 m medley

Raphael Matthew San Miguel Chua (born October 5, 1982), known as Timmy Chua, is a Filipino former swimmer, who specialized in breaststroke events. He is a two-time medalist in the same stroke at the 2005 Southeast Asian Games.

== Early life and education ==
Raphael Matthew "Timmy" Chua was born on October 5, 1982 At the age of 11, he and his two older brothers joined the swimming team of the Philippine Columbian Association Sports Club. Initially, Chua was slower than his brothers, prompting his coaches to advise him to refrain from participating in other sports and games so he could focus on improving his swimming. He also attended San Beda High School. In 1995, at age 13, Chua participated in a swimming camp led by American coach Mike Cody.

Chua swam for the San Beda Lions in the junior division of the National Collegiate Athletic Association (NCAA). He was named Junior MVP in swimming in NCAA Season 74 in 1999.

Chua attended the University of the Philippines Diliman. He also swam for the university swimming team in the University Athletic Association of the Philippines (UAAP).

== Career ==
Timmy Chua specialized in breaststroke as a swimmer. He trained under various coaches such as Angelo Lozada and Japanese coach Ryuzo Ishikawa.

Chua qualified for the men's 100 m breaststroke at the 2004 Summer Olympics in Athens, by achieving a FINA B-standard entry time of 1:04.93 from the Hong Kong Long Course Championships, three weeks before the Games were scheduled to begin. Despite his eligibility from FINA, Chua had been battling with the Philippine Amateur Swimming Association (PASA) for failing to inform officials and not granting a permission to compete for the qualifying tournament.

On the first day of the Games, Chua challenged seven other swimmers in heat two, including three-time Olympians Jean Luc Razakarivony of Madagascar and Yevgeny Petrashov of Kyrgyzstan. He edged out Latvia's Pāvels Murāns to take a fourth spot by 0.08 of a second, outside his personal best of 1:06.37. Chua failed to advance into the semifinals, as he placed fiftieth overall out of 60 swimmers in the morning preliminaries.

At the 2005 Southeast Asian Games in Manila, Chua collected two bronze medals in the 100 m breaststroke (1:04.35) and 400 m medley relay (3:52.70), as a member of the host nation team.

Chua was part of the multi-school Philippines squad which took part in the 2006 Asean University Games in Hanoi, Vietnam.

== Retirement ==
Shortly the SEA Games, Chua retired from national duty to focus on finishing his engineering course at the University of the Philippines Diliman in Quezon City. By 2012, Chua had become technical sales and service manager for LaFarge, a multinational French company that handles cement. He is also a part-time member of the Philippine Olympic Committee board.
