= Natalia Roschina =

Russian swimming coach (born 1954)

Natalia Nikolaevna Roshchina
Current position
- Title: Head Coach
- Team: Russian National Team (Swimming)

Biographical details
- Born: December 6, 1954 (age 71); Soviet Union → Russia
- Education: Siberian Academy of Physical Culture (Omsk)

Accomplishments and honors

Awards
- Honored Coach of Russia; Medal of the Order "For Merit to the Fatherland"

Natalia Nikolaevna Roshchina (Russian: Наталья Николаевна Рощина; born 6 December 1954) is a Russian swimming coach. She holds the title of Honored Coach of Russia and has served as a coach of the Russian national swimming team since 1995.

== Biography ==
Natalia Nikolaevna Roshchina was born on 6 December 1954. She became the first Master of Sport of the USSR in swimming from the city of Omsk.

She is a graduate of the Siberian Academy of Physical Culture. In 1985, a coaching team was formed at the "Irtysh" swimming pool in Omsk with the participation of Natalia Roshchina. It brought together former athletes and enthusiastic coaches. The founding members included: Roshchina N.N., Sludnov A.V., Rudzit I.R., and Kachan (Bezkrovnaya) S.A.

The team began its work at the swimming department of the DSO "Vodnik" sports school. In the 1990s, following a series of organizational reforms, the team relocated to the "Albatros" swimming pool, where it continued its activities within the Specialized Youth Sports School of Olympic Reserve of the VDFSO of Trade Unions.

== Career ==
Since 1995, Natalia Roshchina has been a part of the coaching staff of the Russian national swimming team. She works in the city of Omsk and specializes in training athletes in all swimming styles.

Her first major success came in 1994–1995 when her trainee Dmitry Chernyshev won the Russian Short Course Championship in the 200 m butterfly. Later came the triumphant career of Roman Sludnov, who became the first swimmer in the world to swim the 100 m breaststroke in under one minute.

Under her guidance, Sludnov became a bronze medalist at the 2000 Summer Olympics in Sydney, a three-time world champion, a six-time world record holder, a six-time European champion, and a twelve-time European record holder.

Among her recent achievements is the silver medal won by Martin Malyutin at the 2020 Summer Olympics in Tokyo (held in 2021) in the 4 × 200 m freestyle relay.

Today, the coaching team led by Natalia Roshchina continues its work. It includes instructors A.V. Moskovenko, K.V. Lazarenko, and Roshchina herself. The team is actively engaged in scouting and developing talented young athletes, preparing them for national and international competitions.

== Notable students ==
- Roman Sludnov — Honored Master of Sports, bronze medalist at the 2000 Summer Olympics, multiple-time world and European champion and multiple-time world record holder.
- Martin Malyutin — Honored Master of Sports, silver medalist at the 2020 Summer Olympics, three-time European champion in 2021.
- Artyom Sludnov — International Master of Sports of Russia
- Elena Karpeeva — International Master of Sports of Russia
- Agata Voloshchuk — International Master of Sports of Russia
- Tatyana Ponomarenko — International Master of Sports of Russia
- Anton Agheshkin — International Master of Sports of Russia

Among her other trainees are multiple-time winners and medalists of Russian national championships and junior championships, as well as participants of European youth competitions and Masters of Sport: Nikolay Ninevolin, Yuri Chubatov, Stanislav Panov, Vitaly Miroshnichenko, Mikhail Strelets, Igor Ivakin, Olesya Malykh, Andrey Botvin, and Valeria Vaselenok.

== Family ==
Her son, Roman Sludnov, is an Olympic bronze medalist and the first person in the world to swim the 100 m breaststroke in under one minute. Natalia Nikolaevna has not only been his mother but also his personal coach throughout his entire career.
