= Wickus =

Wickus is both a given name and a surname.

Notable people with the given name include:

- Wickus Nienaber (born 1981), Swazi swimmer
- Wickus van Vuuren (born 1989), South African cricketer

Notable people with the surname include:

- Amy Wickus (born 1972), American middle-distance runner
