= Hakan Kiper =

Turkish swimmer (born 1973)

Personal information
- Full name: Hakan Kiper
- National team: Turkey
- Born: 4 August 1973 (age 52)
- Height: 1.83 m (6 ft 0 in)
- Weight: 69 kg (152 lb)

Sport
- Sport: Swimming
- Strokes: Breaststroke
- Club: Galatasaray Spor Kulübü

Hakan Kiper (born August 4, 1973) is a Turkish former swimmer, who specialized in breaststroke events. During his sporting career, he held numerous Turkish championship titles and meet records, and played for Galatasaray Spor Kulübü. Kiper also represented Turkey, as a 27-year-old, at the 2000 Summer Olympics, where he served as the captain of the national swimming team.

Kiper competed only in the men's 100 m breaststroke at the 2000 Summer Olympics in Sydney. He achieved a FINA B-cut of 1:05.29 from the Speedo Turkish Open Championships in Istanbul. He challenged seven other swimmers in heat three, including three-time Olympian Jorg Lindemeier of Namibia. He rounded out the field to last place in 1:07.46, a 3.34-second deficit from leader Vadim Tatarov of Moldova. Kiper failed to advance into the semifinals, as he placed sixtieth overall on the first day of prelims.
