= Facinet Bangoura =

Guinean swimmer

Personal information
- Born: March 7, 1972 (age 54) Conakry, Guinea

Sport
- Sport: Swimming
- Strokes: Breaststroke

Facinet Bangoura (born March 7, 1972) is a Guinean former swimmer, who specialized in breaststroke events. Bangoura competed only in the men's 100 m breaststroke at the 2000 Summer Olympics in Sydney. He received a Universality place from FINA, in an entry time of 1:10.00. He challenged six other swimmers in heat two, including two-time Olympians Juan José Madrigal of Costa Rica and Jean Luc Razakarivony of Madagascar. Before the start of his heat, Bangoura immediately jumped into the pool first, and was disqualified for breaking a no false-start rule on the first day of preliminaries.

Since the Olympics, Bangoura has toured the world performing on the balafon, an instrument he has played since he was taught by his mother at the age of five.
