= Oleg Sidorov =

Uzbekistani swimmer (born 1983)

Personal information
- Full name: Oleg Sidorov
- National team: Uzbekistan
- Born: 15 September 1983 (age 42) Tashkent, Uzbek SSR, Soviet Union
- Height: 1.78 m (5 ft 10 in)
- Weight: 83 kg (183 lb)

Sport
- Sport: Swimming
- Strokes: Breaststroke

Oleg Sidorov (Uzbek: Олег Сидоров; born September 15, 1983) is an Uzbek former swimmer, who specialized in breaststroke events. Sidorov qualified for the men's 100 m breaststroke at the 2004 Summer Olympics in Athens, by achieving a FINA B-standard of 1:04.91 from the Russian Championships in Moscow. He challenged seven other swimmers in heat two, including three-time Olympians Jean Luc Razakarivony of Madagascar and Yevgeny Petrashov of Kyrgyzstan. He rounded out the field to last place by more than half a second (0.50) behind Petrashov in 1:08.30. Sidorov failed to advance into the semifinals, as he placed fifty-sixth overall out of 60 swimmers on the first day of preliminaries.
