= Marko Pachel =

Estonian swimmer

Personal information
- Born: 25 September 1972 (age 53) Tallinn, then part of Estonian SSR, Soviet Union

Sport
- Sport: Swimming

Marko Pachel (born 25 September 1972) is an Estonian breaststroke swimmer. He competed in two events at the 1992 Summer Olympics. His younger brother is swimmer Raiko Pachel.
