= Cristian Mauro Soldano =

Argentine swimmer (born 1976)

Personal information
- Full name: Cristian Mauro Soldano
- National team: Argentina
- Born: 2 June 1976 (age 50) Salta, Argentina
- Height: 1.70 m (5 ft 7 in)
- Weight: 70 kg (154 lb)

Sport
- Sport: Swimming
- Strokes: Breaststroke

Cristian Mauro Soldano (born June 2, 1976) is an Argentine former swimmer, who specialized in breaststroke events. He is a two-time semifinalist in the 100 m breaststroke at the Pan American Games (2003 and 2007).

Soldano qualified for the men's 100 m breaststroke, as Argentina's oldest swimmer (aged 28), at the 2004 Summer Olympics in Athens. He cleared a FINA B-standard entry time of 1:03.63 from the Brazilian Championships in Rio de Janeiro. He challenged seven other swimmers on the fourth heat, including four-time Olympian Ratapong Sirisanont (Thailand), who was later disqualified for a false start. With only seven left in the pool, Soldano rounded out the field to last place in 1:05.05, more than one second off his entry time. Soldano failed to advance into the semifinals, as he placed forty-third overall on the first day of preliminaries.
