= René Kolonko =

German swimmer

Personal information
- Full name: René Kolonko
- National team: Germany
- Born: 18 August 1981 (age 45) Leipzig, East Germany
- Height: 2.00 m (6 ft 7 in)
- Weight: 87 kg (192 lb)

Sport
- Sport: Swimming
- Strokes: Breaststroke
- Club: SC Riesa
- Coach: Uwe Neumann

René Kolonko (born 18 August 1981) is a German former swimmer, who specialized in breaststroke events. He is a member of the swimming team for SC Riesa an der Elbe in Riesa, and is coached and trained by Uwe Neumann.

Kolonko represented Germany at the 2004 Summer Olympics in Athens, where he competed in the men's 100 m breaststroke. He had just barely advanced into the semifinals, after securing the sixteenth spot from the morning's preliminary heats, clocking at 1:02.09. Kolonko failed to advance into the final, but lowered his Olympic entry time (1:01.88) by six hundredths of a second (0.06), finishing his semifinal run with a time of 1:01.82.
