= Ben Labowitch =

New Zealand swimmer (born 1980)

Personal information
- Full name: Ben-Rachmiel Labowitch
- National team: New Zealand
- Born: 1 July 1980 (age 46) Fremantle, Western Australia, Australia
- Height: 1.89 m (6 ft 2 in)
- Weight: 90 kg (198 lb)

Sport
- Sport: Swimming
- Strokes: Breaststroke
- Club: North Shore Swim Club
- College team: Drury University (U.S.)
- Coach: Thomas Ansorg

Ben-Rachmiel Labowitch (born 1 July 1980) is a New Zealand former swimmer, who specialised in breaststroke events. Since his mother is a New Zealand citizen, Labowitch claims a dual citizenship which allowed him to try out and make the New Zealand Olympic team. Labowitch is also a former member of North Shore Swim Club under his coach Thomas Ensorg, and a graduate of Drury University in Springfield, Missouri, where he played for the Drury Panthers.

Labowitch qualified for three swimming events at the 2004 Summer Olympics in Athens. He posted FINA B-standard entry times of 1:04.35 (100 m breaststroke) and 2:18.10 (200 m breaststroke) from the Olympic trials in Auckland. On the first day of the Games, Labowitch shared a thirty-sixth place tie with Puerto Rico's Arsenio López in the 100 m breaststroke. Swimming in heat three, he edged out Lithuania's Aurimas Valaitis to break a 1:04 barrier and seize a third seed by 0.12 of a second in 1:03.99. In his second event, 200 m breaststroke, Labowitch challenged seven other swimmers in heat two, including dual citizen Mihail Alexandrov of Bulgaria. He raced to seventh place and thirty-ninth overall in 2:19.25, just 1.15 seconds off his entry time. He also teamed up with Scott Talbot-Cameron, Corney Swanepoel, and Cameron Gibson in the 4 × 100 m medley relay. Swimming the breaststroke leg in heat two, Labowitch recorded a time of 1:03.88, but the New Zealand team missed the final by 5 seconds, finishing in seventh place and twelfth overall with a final time of 3:42.74.
