= Kieran Chan =

Papua New Guinean swimmer

Personal information
- Full name: Kieran Chan
- National team: Papua New Guinea
- Born: 29 December 1984 (age 41) Boroko, Port Moresby, Papua New Guinea
- Height: 1.78 m (5 ft 10 in)

Sport
- Sport: Swimming
- Strokes: Breaststroke
- Club: Boroko Swim Club

Kieran Chan (born December 29, 1984) is a Papua New Guinean former swimmer, who specialized in breaststroke events. Chan competed for Papua New Guinea in the men's 100 m breaststroke at the 2000 Summer Olympics in Sydney. He received a Universality place from FINA, in an entry time of 1:14.40. He participated in heat one against two other swimmers Antonio Leon of Paraguay and Joe Atuhaire of Uganda. Diving in with a 0.95-second deficit, Chan enjoyed the race of his life to take only a second seed in a lifetime best of 1:13.34. Chan failed to advance into the semifinals, as he placed sixty-third overall on the first day of prelims.
