= Margarita Kalmikova =

Latvian swimmer

Personal information
- Full name: Margarita Kalmikova
- Nickname: Rita
- National team: Latvia
- Born: 7 September 1980 (age 45) Riga, Latvian SSR, Soviet Union
- Height: 1.68 m (5 ft 6 in)
- Weight: 62 kg (137 lb)

Sport
- Sport: Swimming
- Strokes: Breaststroke
- College team: Lewis University (U.S.)
- Coach: Jeļena Solovjova; Steve Thompson (U.S.)

Margarita "Rita" Kalmikova (born September 7, 1980) is a Latvian former swimmer, who specialized in breaststroke events. She is a two-time Olympian (1996 and 2000), and a former Latvian record holder in the 200 m breaststroke (2:35.37). While studying in the United States, she achieved a school record in the 200-yard breaststroke, and was named five-time All-American as a captain and rookie of Lewis University's swimming and diving team. Since her sporting career ended in 2005, Kalmikova has extensively traveled across the United States to work as an assistant coach.

== Career ==
=== Early years ===
Kalmikova, a native of Riga, Latvia, started swimming competitively at the age of eleven. Both of her parents were swimming coaches that motivated and inspired her to undergo training to an elite level and to become part of the Latvian squad. Her elder brother Valērijs Kalmikovs, also an elite breaststroke swimmer, shared a sibling tandem in the sport, when they both competed together in two editions of the Olympic Games (1996 and 2000).

=== International career ===
Kalmikova made her official debut, along with her brother Valērijs Kalmikovs, at the 1996 Summer Olympics in Atlanta, where she competed in the 200 m breaststroke. Swimming in heat two, she overhauled a 2:40-barrier and raced to the third seed in a Latvian record of 2:39.63. Because of her remarkable legacy, she was named Best Female Swimmer of the year by the Latvian Olympic Committee.

At the 2000 Summer Olympics in Sydney, Kalmikova competed again in the 200 m breaststroke. She achieved a FINA B-cut of 2:35.37 from the Russian National Championships in Moscow. She challenged seven other swimmers in heat two, including teenagers Nicolette Teo of Singapore (aged 14) and Siow Yi Ting (aged 16). Kalmikova faded down the stretch on the final stretch from third at the halfway turn to a fourth seed in a 2:35.69, 32-hundredths of a second below her entry standard and 2.35 behind leader İlkay Dikmen of Turkey. Kalmikova failed to advance into the semifinals, as she placed twenty-eighth overall in the prelims.

=== College career ===
Shortly after her second Olympics, Kalmikova accepted an athletic scholarship to attend Lewis University in Romeoville, Illinois, where she played for the Lewis Flyers swimming and diving team under head coach Steve Thompson from 2001 to 2005. While swimming for the Flyers, she was named the Most Valuable Swimmer twice in 2002 and 2003, served as the school's team captain, and received five All-American titles. During her sophomore season, Kalmikova established school records in the 100-yard breaststroke (1:04.80) and 200-yard breaststroke (2:17.85) at the 2003 NCAA Division II Swimming and Diving Championships in Grand Forks, North Dakota. In the spring of 2005, Kalmikova graduated from the University with a Bachelor of Arts degree major in human communication and business management, ending her illustrious sporting career.

== Life after swimming ==
Since her swimming career ended in 2005, Kalmikova has traveled extensively across the United States to pursue a coaching opportunity. She formerly served as an assistant swimming coach at the Western Kentucky University in 2007, and later attended the Bowling Green State University to complete her two-year Master of Science degree in sports administration. Applying for the same job to her resume, she helped the school's teams enjoy their conference and national success in college swimming. She also trained Claire Donahue, silver medalist in the 100 m butterfly at the 2011 NCAA Women's Swimming and Diving Championships, who later became a sixth-place finalist at the 2012 Summer Olympics in London.

From 2013-2015, Kalmikova was the head coach of the men's and women's swimming teams at Tiffin University in Tiffin, Ohio.

She was last known to be working as a swim coach at The Claremont Club in Claremont California as of 2015.
