= Adam Whitehead =

British swimmer, Olympic athlete, Commonwealth Games gold medallist

Personal information
- Full name: Adam James Whitehead
- Nationality: Great Britain
- Born: 28 March 1980 (age 46) Coventry, England

Sport
- Sport: Swimming
- Strokes: breaststroke
Medal record
Men's swimming
Representing Great Britain
European Championships (SC)
Gold medal – first place	1998 Sheffield	200 m breaststroke
Bronze medal – third place	1999 Lisbon	200 m breaststroke
Universiade
Bronze medal – third place	2001 Beijing	50 m breaststroke
Representing England
Commonwealth Games
Gold medal – first place	2002 Manchester	100 m breaststroke
Silver medal – second place	2002 Manchester	50 m breaststroke
Bronze medal – third place	1998 Kuala Lumpur	200 m breaststroke

Adam James Whitehead (born 28 March 1980) is a male former breaststroke swimmer from Coventry, England.

== Early life ==
He attended Henley College Coventry.

== Competitive swimming career ==
Whitehead competed at the 2000 Summer Olympics in Sydney, Australia. There he was eliminated in the qualifying heats of the men's 100 m and 200 m breaststroke.

He represented England and won a bronze medal in the 200 metres breaststroke event, at the 1998 Commonwealth Games in Kuala Lumpur, Malaysia. Four years later he won a gold medal and silver medal in the breaststroke events at the 2002 Commonwealth Games.

At the ASA National British Championships he won the 50 metres breaststroke and the 100 metres breaststroke in 1999. However, in his strongest event, the 200 metres breaststroke, he won the title three times (1998, 1999 and 2000).

== Mentoring and management ==
After this, he worked with the Dame Kelly Holmes Trust as an athlete mentor, using the experiences and skills he gained as an elite sports performer to inspire and support young people, and later in a management role.

== See also ==
- List of Commonwealth Games medallists in swimming (men)
