= Vadim Tatarov =

Moldovan swimmer

Personal information
- Full name: Vadim Tatarov
- National team: Moldova
- Born: 3 May 1971 (age 55) Chişinău, Moldavian SSR
- Height: 1.79 m (5 ft 10 in)
- Weight: 72 kg (159 lb)

Sport
- Sport: Swimming
- Strokes: Breaststroke
- Club: Moldova Swimming Team

Vadim Tatarov (born May 3, 1971) is a Moldovan former swimmer, who specialized in breaststroke events. He is a two-time Olympian (1996 and 2000), and a former Moldovan record holder in both 100 and 200 m breaststroke.

Tatarov made his Olympic debut, as a 25-year-old, at the 1996 Summer Olympics in Atlanta. He failed to reach the top 16 final in any of his individual events, finishing thirtieth in the 100 m breaststroke (1:04.87), and twenty-eighth in the 200 m breaststroke (2:21.34).

At the 2000 Summer Olympics in Sydney, Tatarov swam only in the 100 m breaststroke. He achieved a FINA B-standard entry time of 1:05.53 from the Russian Open Championships in Saint Petersburg. He established a Moldovan record of 1:04.12 to power past the entire field with an unexpected triumph in heat three, coming from an outside lane. Tatarov's first-place effort was not enough to put him through to the semifinals, as he placed thirty-sixth overall in the prelims.
