= Antonio Leon (swimmer) =

Paraguayan swimmer

Personal information
- Full name: Antonio Manuel Leon Candia
- National team: Paraguay
- Born: 4 August 1982 (age 43) Asunción, Paraguay
- Height: 1.81 m (5 ft 11 in)
- Weight: 78 kg (172 lb)

Sport
- Sport: Swimming
- Strokes: Breaststroke
- Club: Deportivo de Puerto Sajonia
- Coach: Roberto Colmán

Antonio Manuel Leon Candia (born August 4, 1982) is a Paraguayan former swimmer, who specialized in breaststroke events. During his sporting career, he represented Paraguay, as an eighteen-year-old, at the 2000 Summer Olympics, and in all four editions of the FINA World Championships since 2001. Leon also trained for Deportivo de Puerto Sajonia, under his longtime coach and mentor Roberto Colmán.

Leon competed only in the men's 100 m breaststroke at the 2000 Summer Olympics in Sydney. He received a Universality place from FINA, without meeting an entry time. He participated in heat one against two other swimmers Kieran Chan of Papua New Guinea and Joe Atuhaire of Uganda. Leon pulled away from a small field, and opened up his lead to a top seed in a new Paraguayan record of 1:08.12. Leon failed to advance into the semifinals, as he placed sixty-first overall on the first day of prelims.
