= Mihály Flaskay =

Hungarian swimmer

Medal record

Representing Hungary

Men's swimming

World Championships (LC)
Bronze medal – third place	2003 Barcelona	50 m breaststroke

European Championships (LC)
Silver medal – second place	2002 Berlin	50 m breaststroke

Summer Universiade
Bronze medal – third place	2003 Daegu	50 m breaststroke

Mihály Flaskay (born 18 May 1982 in Debrecen) is a breaststroke swimmer from Hungary, who was a silver medallist in the 50 m breaststroke (27.51) at the 2002 European Swimming Championships. In the following year he captured bronze in the same event at the 2003 World Aquatics Championships in Barcelona, Spain.

Flaskay studied at the University of Southern California.
