= Alice Shrestha =

Nepalese swimmer

Personal information
- Full name: Alice Shrestha
- National team: Nepal
- Height: 1.75 m (5 ft 9 in)
- Weight: 69 kg (152 lb)

Sport
- Sport: Swimming
- Strokes: Breaststroke

Alice Shrestha (Nepali: एलिश श्रेष्ठ) is a Nepalese swimmer, who specialised in breaststroke events. Shrestha qualified for the men's 100 m breaststroke at the 2004 Summer Olympics in Athens, by receiving a Universality place from FINA in an entry time of 1:15.49. He participated in heat one against three other swimmers Eric Williams of Nigeria, Chisela Kanchela of Zambia, and Amar Shah of Kenya. He rounded out a small field of four with a time of 1:12.25, setting a new national record.
