= Raiko Pachel =

Estonian swimmer

Personal information
- National team: Estonia
- Born: 2 June 1974 (age 52) Tallinn, then part of Estonian SSR, Soviet Union
- Height: 1.92 m (6 ft 4 in)
- Weight: 87 kg (192 lb)

Sport
- Sport: Swimming
- Strokes: Breaststroke
- Club: Keila Swim Club
- Coach: Tõnu Meijel

Raiko Pachel (born 2 June 1974) is an Estonian former swimmer, who specialized in breaststroke events. He is a single-time Olympian (2000), a double Baltic States swimming champion, and a former Estonian record holder in both 100 and 200 m breaststroke. Pachel is also a member of Keila Swim Club in Tallinn under head coach Tõnu Meijel. His older brother is swimmer Marko Pachel.

Pachel competed in a breaststroke double at the 2000 Summer Olympics in Sydney. He achieved FINA B-standards of 1:03.39 (100 m breaststroke) and 2:18.45 (200 m breaststroke) from the European Championships in Helsinki, Finland. In the 100 m breaststroke, held on the first day of the Games, Pachel challenged seven other swimmers in heat six, including Australia's top favorite and former bronze medalist Phil Rogers. He rounded out a field to last place in his heat, but shared a thirty-second overall seed with Israel's Tal Stricker in a matching time of 1:03.99. Four days later, in the 200 m breaststroke, Pachel placed thirty-third on the morning prelims. Swimming in heat three, he picked up a third spot to overhaul a 2:20 barrier ahead of El Salvador's Francisco Suriano by almost half a second (0.50) in 2:19.71.
