= Yevgeny Petrashov =

Kyrgyz swimmer (born 1974)

Personal information
- Full name: Yevgeny Petrashov
- National team: Kyrgyzstan
- Born: 4 September 1974 (age 52) Frunze, Kirghiz SSR, Soviet Union
- Height: 1.85 m (6 ft 1 in)
- Weight: 74 kg (163 lb)

Sport
- Sport: Swimming
- Strokes: Breaststroke

Yevgeny Petrashov (born September 4, 1974) is a Kyrgyz former swimmer, who specialized in breaststroke events. He is a three-time Olympian (1996, 2000, and 2004), and a former Kyrgyzstan record holder in both 100 and 200 m breaststroke.

== Biography ==
His son is Olympic swimmer Denis Petrashov.

Petrashov made his first Kyrgyz team at the 1996 Summer Olympics in Atlanta. There, he failed to reach the top 16 final in the men's 100 m breaststroke, finishing in forty-second place with a time of 1:07.44. He also placed twenty-first, as a member of the Kyrgyzstan team, in the 4 × 100 m medley relay (3:56.24).

On his second Olympic appearance in Sydney 2000, Petrashov fell to last place and fifty-ninth overall in heat four of the 100 m breaststroke by a 3.30-second margin behind joint winners Arsenio López of Puerto Rico and Valērijs Kalmikovs of Latvia, finishing the race at 1:07.32.

Petrashov swam for his third time in the 100 m breaststroke at the 2004 Summer Olympics in Athens. He achieved a FINA B-standard of 1:04.82 from the Kazakhstan Open Championships in Almaty. He challenged seven other swimmers in heat two, including Madagascar's Jean Luc Razakarivony, who also competed in the same number of Games. He earned a seventh spot by four hundredths of a second (0.04) behind Razakarivony in 1:07.78. Petrashov ended his third and final Olympic stint with a fifty-fifth-place effort on the first day of preliminaries.

Petrashov currently serves as the head coach of Kyrgyzstan's swimming squad.

== Major results ==
=== Individual ===
Year	Competition	Venue	Position	Event	Notes
Representing Kyrgyzstan
1996	Olympic Games	Atlanta, United States	42nd (h)	100 m breaststroke	1:07.44
1998	World Championships	Perth, Australia	39th (h)	100 m breaststroke	1:06.57
1998	World Championships	Perth, Australia	31st (h)	200 m breaststroke	2:23.50
2000	Olympic Games	Sydney, Australia	59th (h)	100 m breaststroke	1:07.32
2004	Olympic Games	Athens, Greece	55th (h)	100 m breaststroke	1:07.78
2006	Asian Games	Doha, Qatar	27th (h)	50 m butterfly	26.85
2007	World Championships	Melbourne, Australia	81st (h)	50 m butterfly	26.19

=== Relay ===
Year	Competition	Venue	Position	Event	Notes
Representing Kyrgyzstan
1996	Olympic Games	Atlanta, United States	21st (h)	4 × 100 m medley relay	3:56.24
