= Onan Thom =

Guyanese swimmer

Onan Orlando Thom
Personal information
- Full name: Onan Orlando Thom
- National team: Guyana
- Born: 11 April 1984 (age 42) Linden, Guyana
- Height: 1.88 m (6 ft 2 in)
- Weight: 86 kg (190 lb)

Sport
- Sport: Swimming
- Strokes: Freestyle
Medal record
Islamic Solidarity Games
Bronze medal – third place	2005 Jeddah	50 m backstroke

Onan Orlando Thom (born April 11, 1984) is a Guyanese former swimmer, who specialized in sprint freestyle events. Thom qualified for the men's 100 m freestyle at the 2004 Summer Olympics in Athens, by receiving a Universality place from FINA, in an entry time of 54.14. He challenged seven other swimmers in heat two, including three-time Olympian Aleksandr Agafonov of Uzbekistan. He earned a sixth spot in 55.24, more than a second off his entry time. Thom failed to advance into the semifinals, as he placed fifty-ninth overall out of 71 swimmers in the preliminaries.

== Major results ==
=== Individual ===
==== Long course ====
Year	Competition	Venue	Position	Event	Notes
Representing Guyana
2003	World Championships	Barcelona, Spain	88th (h)	50 m freestyle	24.84
2003	World Championships	Barcelona, Spain	107th (h)	100 m freestyle	55.44
2003	World Championships	Barcelona, Spain	54th (h)	50 m backstroke	28.80
2003	World Championships	Barcelona, Spain	66th (h)	100 m backstroke	1:03.91
2003	World Championships	Barcelona, Spain	70th (h)	50 m breaststroke	32.26
2003	World Championships	Barcelona, Spain	73rd (h)	100 m breaststroke	1:10.51
2003	Pan American Games	Santo Domingo, Dominican Republic	28th (h)	50 m freestyle	24.83
2003	Pan American Games	Santo Domingo, Dominican Republic	31st (h)	100 m freestyle	54.14
2003	Pan American Games	Santo Domingo, Dominican Republic	20th (h)	100 m breaststroke	1:10.78
