= Juan José Madrigal =

Costa Rican swimmer

J.J. Madrigal Pacheco
Personal information
- Full name: Juan José Madrigal Pacheco
- Nickname: J.J.
- National team: Costa Rica
- Born: 8 March 1974 (age 52) Alajuela, Costa Rica
- Height: 1.80 m (5 ft 11 in)
- Weight: 78 kg (172 lb)

Sport
- Sport: Swimming
- Strokes: Breaststroke

Juan José Madrigal Pacheco (born March 8, 1974) is a Costa Rican former swimmer, who specialized in breaststroke events. He is a two-time Olympian (1996 and 2000), and a Costa Rican former record holder in the 50-, 100-, and 200-m breaststroke (long course and short course).

Madrigal made his Olympic debut at the 1996 Summer Olympics in Atlanta, where he competed only in the 100 m breaststroke. Swimming in heat two, he held off Namibia's Jorg Lindemeier by three-hundredths of a second (.03) to pick up a third seed in 1:05.47.

At the 2000 Summer Olympics in Sydney, Madrigal qualified for a breaststroke double. He achieved FINA B-standards of 1:05.61 (100 m breaststroke) and 2:20.00 (200 m breaststroke) from the 2000 Janet Evans Invitational in USC Los Angeles, California, United States. In the 100 m breaststroke, held on the first day of the games, Madrigal established a new Costa Rican record of 1:05.14 to lead the second heat, but ended up overall in forty-eighth place. Three days later, in the 200 m breaststroke, Madrigal placed forty-third on the morning prelims, swimming in heat three.
