= Valērijs Kalmikovs =

Latvian swimmer (born 1973)

Personal information
- Full name: Valērijs Kalmikovs
- Nicknames: Val, Valery
- National team: Latvia
- Born: 4 March 1973 (age 53) Riga, Latvian SSR, Soviet Union
- Height: 1.92 m (6 ft 4 in)
- Weight: 89 kg (196 lb)

Sport
- Sport: Swimming
- Strokes: Breaststroke, medley
- College team: University of Nebraska–Lincoln (U.S.)
- Coach: Jeļena Solovjova; Cal Bentz (U.S.)

Valērijs "Val" Kalmikovs (born March 4, 1973) is a Latvian former swimmer, who specialized in breaststroke and individual medley events. He is a two-time Olympian (1996 and 2000) and a top 16 finalist in the 200 m breaststroke on his Olympic debut in Atlanta (1996). He still holds a Latvian record in the 200 m breaststroke (2:16.21) that stood for more than a decade. While studying in the United States, Kalmikovs achieved a sixth-fastest of all time in the 200-yard breaststroke at the 2000 NCAA Men's Swimming and Diving Championships. He has also been named a three-time Big-12 Conference Champion and a nine-time All-American, as a member of the University of Nebraska–Lincoln swimming and diving team. Since his sporting career ended in 2004, Kalmikovs has extensively traveled across the United States and Europe, working as a swimming coach. On September 9. 2019 Val became the first Latvian to swim across The English Channel. It took him 11 hours and 13 minutes (6pm-5am) to successfully finish the challenge.

== Early years ==
Kalmikovs, a native of Riga, Latvia, started swimming at the very young age under a Soviet system. Both of his parents were swimming coaches that motivated and inspired him to undergo training to an elite level and to become part of the Latvian squad. He has one younger sister, Margarita Kalmikova, who is also an elite breaststroke swimmer. Kalmikovs and his sister shared a sibling tandem in the sport, when they both competed together in two editions of the Olympic Games (1996 and 2000).

== Career ==
=== College career ===
Kalmikovs accepted an athletic scholarship to attend the University of Nebraska–Lincoln in Lincoln, Nebraska, where he competed for the Nebraska Cornhuskers swimming and diving team under head coach Cal Bentz. While swimming for the Cornhuskers, Kalmikovs received a total of nine All-American honors, captured three Big 12 Conference titles, and held four school records in the 100 and 200-yard breaststroke. At the 2000 NCAA Men's Swimming and Diving Championships, during his junior year, Kalmikovs posted a sixth-fastest time of 2:10.64 in the 200-yard breaststroke, where Ed Moses set a new world record. In his senior season, Kalmikovs served as an assistant volunteer coach for the team before he graduated from the university in 2001 with a Bachelor of Arts degree in international affairs.

=== International career ===
Kalmikovs made his official debut, along with his sister Margarita Kalmikova, at the 1996 Summer Olympics in Atlanta. He failed to reach the top 16 final in two out of his three attempts, finishing twenty-first in the 200 m individual medley (2:06.16), and eighteenth in the 400 m individual medley (4:28.04). In his third attempt, 200 m breaststroke, Kalmikovs powered home with a thirteenth-place effort in the B-Final at 2:16.23.

At the 1998 FINA World Championships in Perth, Australia, Kalmikovs placed twenty-second in the 200 m breaststroke (2:21.22), and thirty-eighth in the 200 m individual medley (2:10.28), all from the prelims.

At the 2000 Summer Olympics in Sydney, Kalmikovs decided to drop half of his medley double, and experiment instead with 100 m breaststroke. He achieved FINA B-standards of 1:04.89 (100 m breaststroke), 2:16.30 (200 m breaststroke), and 2:04.83 (200 m individual medley) from the European Championships in Helsinki. On the first day of the Games, Kalmikovs placed thirty-fourth in the 100 m breaststroke. Swimming in heat four, he enjoyed a sprint finish with Puerto Rico's Arsenio López, as they both hit the wall first in a matching time of 1:04.02. Three days later, in the 200 m breaststroke, Kalmikovs established a new Latvian record of 2:16.21 to pull off a nineteenth-place effort from the heats, but missed the semifinal cut by more than half a second (0.50). In his final event, 200 m individual medley, Kalmikovs placed twenty-fourth on the morning prelims. Swimming again in heat four, he came up short in second place by 0.11 of a second behind New Zealand's Dean Kent in a lifetime best of 2:04.18.

At the 2001 FINA World Championships in Fukuoka, Japan, Kalmikovs competed only in a breaststroke double. He failed to produce best results for the semifinals in any of his individual events, finishing thirty-fifth in the 100 m breaststroke (1:05.36), and twenty-first in the 200 m breaststroke (2:19.23).

Kalmikovs also sought his bid for his third Olympics in Athens, but forced to drop out from the Games, because of a wrist injury. Shortly after his qualifying bid, he announced his retirement from swimming.

Kalmikovs successfully swam the English Channel on 2019-09-09 in 11 hours and 13 minutes, becoming the first Latvian to do so.

== Life after swimming ==
Since he graduated from the University of Nebraska–Lincoln in 2001, Kalmikovs continued to serve as an assistant swimming coach. He completed his master's degree in sports management and athletic administration at Valparaiso University in 2003, and later moved to California to coach numerous age group swimmers for Bakersfield Swim Club. He was awarded the 2004 Central California Coach of the Year after a few of his swimmers won USA Junior National Championships.

Since his sporting career ended in 2004, Kalmikovs has extensively traveled across the United States and Europe, working as a swimming coach. He is married to Australian swimmer Joy Symons, and currently resided together in Rockhampton, Queensland, along with their two children Jett and Cooper.

On September 9. 2019 Val became the first Latvian to swim English Channel. It took 11 hours and 13 minutes of swimming over night to successfully finish the challenge.

== See also ==
- Nebraska Cornhuskers
- List of Latvian records in swimming
