= Andrei Cross =

Barbadian swimmer (born 1984)

Personal information
- National team: Barbados
- Born: 2 June 1984 (age 42) Bridgetown, Barbados
- Height: 1.86 m (6 ft 1 in)
- Weight: 86 kg (190 lb)

Sport
- Sport: Swimming
- Strokes: Breaststroke
- Club: TeamBath (GBR)
- Coach: Mark Skimming
Medal record
Central American and Caribbean Games
| Bronze medal – third place | 2006 Cartagena | 100 m breaststroke |
| Bronze medal – third place | 2006 Cartagena | 4x100 m medley relay |

Andrei Cross (born 2 June 1984) is a Barbadian former swimmer, who specialized in the breaststroke events. Cross represented his nation Barbados at the 2008 Summer Olympics, and in two editions of the Commonwealth Games (2002 and 2006), establishing a national record of 29.24 in the 50 m breaststroke. During his swimming career, Cross was affiliated with TeamBath, the sports organization of England's University of Bath, under the tutelage of head coach Mark Skimming.

Cross competed in the men's 100 m breaststroke at the 2008 Summer Olympics in Beijing. Leading up to the Games, he cleared the FINA-B entry standard time in 1:03.64 to assure his selection to the Olympic team at the 2007 Maribor Open in Slovenia. Swimming in heat three of the evening prelims, Cross held off his fast pace over Uzbekistan's Ivan Demyanenko to save the penultimate spot from the eight-swimmer field by 0.17 seconds. Cross' time of 1:04.57 was not good enough to put him through to the semifinals, finishing only in fifty-fifth place overall.

He works as a manager facility at Barbados Amateur Swimming Association.
