= Alfredo Jacobo =

Mexican swimmer (born 1982)

Personal information
- Full name: Alfredo Jacobo Rodríguez
- National team: Mexico
- Born: April 7, 1982 (age 44) León, Mexico

Sport
- Sport: Swimming
- Strokes: Breaststroke
- Club: Mission Viejo Nadadores
- College team: Texas A&M University (U.S.) (2001-2005)
Medal record
Men's swimming
Representing Mexico
Central American & Caribbean Games
Gold medal – first place	2006 Cartagena	50 Breaststroke
Gold medal – first place	2006 Cartagena	100 Breaststroke
Silver medal – second place	2006 Cartagena	200 Breaststroke
Silver medal – second place	2006 Cartagena	4x100 Medley Relay

Alfredo Jacobo Rodríguez (born April 7, 1982) is an Olympic breaststroke swimmer from Mexico.

== Career ==
Alfredo is the older brother of fellow Mexican swimmer, Alejandro Jacobo. He represented Mexico at the 2000 Olympics.

Jacobo also swam for Mexico at the 2003 and 2007 Pan American Games.

As of March 2008, he holds the Mexican Records in the long-course (50m) 50 breaststroke; and the short-course (25m) 50, 100 and 200 breaststrokes.

Alfredo, and his brother Alejandro, both competed/attended college and swam in the USA at Texas A&M University.
