= Ed Moses (swimmer) =

American swimmer (born 1980)

Personal information
- Full name: Glenn Edward Moses Jr.
- Nicknames: "Ed," "Double Bogey"
- National team: United States
- Born: June 7, 1980 (age 46) Loma Linda, California, U.S.
- Height: 5 ft 11 in (180 cm)
- Weight: 172 lb (78 kg)

Sport
- Sport: Swimming
- Strokes: Breaststroke
- Club: Nation’s Capital Swim Club
- College team: University of Virginia
Medal record
Men's swimming
Representing the United States
Olympic Games
| Gold medal – first place | 2000 Sydney | 4×100 m medley |
| Silver medal – second place | 2000 Sydney | 100 m breaststroke |
World Championships (LC)
| Gold medal – first place | 2003 Barcelona | 4×100 m medley |
| Bronze medal – third place | 2001 Fukuoka | 100 m breaststroke |
Pan American Games
| Gold medal – first place | 1999 Winnipeg | 100 m breaststroke |
| Silver medal – second place | 1999 Winnipeg | 4×100 m medley |

Glenn Edward Moses Jr. (born June 7, 1980) is an American former competition swimmer and breaststroke specialist who is an Olympic gold medalist, world champion, and former world record-holder. He represented the United States at the 2000 Summer Olympics, where he won a gold and silver medal.

On January 23, 2002 in Stockholm, Sweden, Moses set a world record in the short course 100-meter breaststroke (57.47). In January 2002, Moses also set the world mark in the short course 200-meter breaststroke, which he lowered again with a time of 2:02.92 in Berlin on January 17, 2004.

== Career ==
Moses was born in Loma Linda, California, to U.S. Air Force colonel Glenn Edward and schoolteacher Sissy Moses. He did not begin swimming year-round until his senior year of high school. He is a class of ‘99 graduate of Lake Braddock Secondary School in Burke, Virginia.

Moses swam for the University of Virginia and won in the 100-meter and 200-meter breaststroke events at the 2000 NCAA Division I Championships, setting world records for both events (in 2000 the NCAAs were swum short course meters, allowing for world records). He graduated from the University of Virginia in 2004 with a degree in sports medicine. He has also volunteered as an assistant coach at the university.

Leading into the 2000 Olympic Games, Moses broke an American record at the 2000 U.S. Olympic Trials. At the 2000 Olympics he won two medals: silver in the 100-meter breaststroke and gold as a member of the USA's world record-setting 4 × 100 medley relay.

On Nov. 5, 2010 SwimmingWorld.TV announced that Ed Moses was making a comeback. As part of his return to swimming, Moses swam at the 2011 U.S. Masters Short Course Nationals.

== Post swimming ==
Moses continued his sporting career as a semi-professional golfer. He co-founded MoJo Marketing & Media, a creative content consulting company. He currently serves as a vice president. He is also pursuing an MBA degree at UCLA Anderson School of Management

In 2003 he finished fourth in Superstars which was televised on CBS.

In 2009 Moses appeared on Golf Channel's Big Break Disney Golf where he was eliminated in the first episode. In 2017, he appeared as a contestant on the Netflix reality series Ultimate Beastmaster, finishing second in his episode.

Moses was a contestant on the television program Mental Samurai on April 16, 2019. He answered 10 out of 12 questions correctly but then ran out of time.

== See also ==
- List of Olympic medalists in swimming (men)
- List of University of Virginia people
- List of World Aquatics Championships medalists in swimming (men)
- World record progression 50 metres breaststroke
- World record progression 100 metres breaststroke
- World record progression 200 metres breaststroke
- World record progression 4 × 100 metres medley relay

Records
| Preceded by Anthony Robinson | Men's 50-meter breaststroke world record-holder (long course); March 31, 2001 – August 2, 2002 | Succeeded by Oleg Lisogor |
| Preceded by Roman Sloudnov | Men's 100-meter breaststroke world record-holder (long course); March 28, 2001– June 28, 2001 | Succeeded by Roman Sloudnov |
| Preceded by Roman Sloudnov | Men's 50-meter breaststroke world record-holder (short course); January 22, 2002 – January 26, 2002 | Succeeded by Oleg Lisogor |
| Preceded by Roman Sloudnov | Men's 100-meter breaststroke world record-holder (short course); March 24, 2000 – November 9, 2008 | Succeeded by Cameron van der Burgh |
| Preceded by Roman Sloudnov | Men's 200-meter breaststroke world record-holder (short course); March 25, 2000 – August 10, 2009 | Succeeded by Christian Sprenger |
Sporting positions
| Preceded by ? | FINA World Cup overall male points winner 2001/2002 | Succeeded by Thomas Rupprath |
| Preceded by Thomas Rupprath | FINA World Cup overall male points winner 2003–2004 | Succeeded by Ryk Neethling |
