= Jörg Lindemeier =

Namibian swimmer (born 1968)

Personal information
- Born: 30 August 1968 (age 57)

Sport
- Sport: Swimming
Medal record
Men's swimming
Representing Namibia
All-Africa Games
Gold medal – first place	1991 Cairo	200 m breaststroke

Jörg Lindemeier (born 30 August 1968) is a Namibian swimmer. Lindemeier competed at the 1992, 1996 and 2000 Summer Olympics for Namibia. He was born in Windhoek. He won a gold medal in the 200 metres breaststroke at the 1991 All-Africa Games.
