= Vanja Rogulj =

Croatian swimmer

Personal information
- Nationality: Croatia
- Born: 13 February 1982 (age 44) Split, Croatia
- Height: 180 cm (5 ft 11 in)
- Weight: 78 kg (172 lb)

Sport
- Sport: Swimming
- Strokes: breaststroke
- College team: Virginia Cavaliers (USA) (2003-2006)
Medal record
Swimming
Representing Croatia
European LC Championships
Silver medal – second place	2008 Eindhoven	4×100 m medley relay
Mediterranean Games
Gold medal – first place	2001 Tunis	100 m breaststroke
Silver medal – second place	2001 Tunis	4x100 m medley

Vanja Rogulj (born 13 February 1982, in Split, SR Croatia, Yugoslavia) is a 3-time Olympics breaststroke swimmer from Croatia. He swam for Croatia at the 2000, 2004 and 2008 Olympics.

He won the 100 m breaststroke at the 2001 Mediterranean Games in Tunis, Tunisia. In 2000 he won the bronze medal in the 4 × 100 m medley relay at the Short Course European Championships.

He attended college at and swam for the USA's University of Virginia.

At the 2008 European Championships, he bettered the Croatian Records in the 100 m breaststroke to 1:01.82. As of June 2009, he also holds the Croatian Records in the 50 m and 200 m breaststrokes (28.08 and 2:16.85) in 2003 and 2004, respectively.

== See also ==
- World Fit
