= Remo Lütolf =

Swiss swimmer

Personal information
- Born: 18 February 1980 (age 46) Altstätten, Switzerland
- Height: 1.90 m (6 ft 3 in)
- Weight: 81 kg (179 lb)

Sport
- Sport: Swimming
- Club: SC Uster Wallisellen
Medal record
Men's swimming
Representing Switzerland
World Championships (SC)
Bronze medal – third place	1999 Hong Kong	50 m breaststroke
European Championships (SC)
Silver medal – second place	2003 Dublin	50 m breaststroke
Bronze medal – third place	2003 Dublin	4×50 m medley
European Championships (LC)
Bronze medal – third place	2000 Helsinki	50 m breaststroke

Remo Lütolf (born 18 February 1980) is a Swiss breaststroke swimmer who won four medals at European and World championships in 1999, 2000 and 2003. He also competed in three events at the 2000 and 2004 Summer Olympics with the best achievement of eighth place in the 100 m breaststroke in 2000.
