= Jarno Pihlava =

Finnish swimmer

Personal information
- Full name: Jarno Pellervo "Jarppa" Pihlava
- Nickname: "Jarno Pellervo"
- Nationality: Finland
- Born: 14 May 1979 (age 47) Raisio, Finland
- Height: 1.76 m (5 ft 9 in)
- Weight: 75 kg (165 lb)

Sport
- Sport: Swimming
- Strokes: Breaststroke
- Club: Raision Urheilijat
Medal record
World Championships (SC)
Bronze medal – third place	2002 Moscow	100 m breaststroke
Bronze medal – third place	2002 Moscow	200 m breaststroke
European Championships (LC)
Silver medal – second place	2000 Helsinki	100 m breaststroke
European Championships (SC)
Silver medal – second place	2002 Riesa	4×50 m medley
Silver medal – second place	2006 Helsinki	4×50 m medley
Bronze medal – third place	2002 Riesa	100 m breaststroke
Bronze medal – third place	2004 Vienna	4×50 m medley

Jarno Pihlava (born 14 May 1979 in Raisio, Finland) is a retired male breaststroke swimmer from Finland. He twice competed for his native country at the Summer Olympics: in 2000 and 2004.
