= Eric Williams (swimmer) =

Nigerian swimmer

Personal information
- Full name: Eric Williams
- National team: Nigeria
- Born: 27 November 1977 (age 48)
- Height: 1.79 m (5 ft 10 in)
- Weight: 78 kg (172 lb)

Sport
- Sport: Swimming
- Strokes: Breaststroke

Eric Williams (born 27 November 1977) is a Nigerian former swimmer who specialized in breaststroke events. He is an Olympian and a multiple-time Nigerian national record holder who represented his country across several major international competitions, including the Olympic Games, Commonwealth Games, and African Games.

== Career ==
=== Early Career and Olympics ===
Williams made early international appearances for Nigeria at the 2002 Commonwealth Games in Manchester and the 2002 FINA Short Course World Championships in Moscow, where he set a national short-course record of 30.15 seconds in the 50-metre breaststroke. He made his long-course World Championship debut in 2003.

At the 2004 Summer Olympics in Athens, Williams competed only in the men's 100 m breaststroke, qualifying under a Universality place from FINA with an entry time of 1:09.60. He swam a time of 1:07.69 to win the first heat against Zambia's Chisela Kanchela, Kenya's Amar Shah, and Nepal's Alice Shrestha. However, he failed to advance to the semifinals, placing 53rd overall out of 60 swimmers during the preliminaries.

=== Later Career and National Records ===
Following the Olympics, Williams remained in Nigerian swimming. He competed at the 2005 World Aquatics Championships in Montreal, racing in the 50 m and 100 m breaststroke.

He established multiple national standards over the next decade. At the 2006 National Sports Festival in Nigeria, he set a national record in the 200 m breaststroke with a time of 2:33.13. The following year, at the 2007 All-Africa Games in Algiers, he set a national record in the 100 m breaststroke with a time of 1:06.83.

In 2011, he represented Nigeria at the 10th African Games in Maputo, Mozambique, where he contributed to another national record time of 3:59.66 in the men's 4x100 m medley relay.

Williams continued in domestic breaststroke events well into his mid-thirties. In July 2012, at the 4th Chief of Naval Staff Open Swimming Competition in Calabar, he won gold and set a new national record in the 50 m breaststroke with a time of 29.74 seconds, breaking his own previous record set in 2007.

=== Personal bests ===
Williams holds several Nigerian national records (NR). His recorded personal best times include:

- 50m Breaststroke (Long Course): 29.74 sec (NR)
- 100m Breaststroke (Long Course): 1:06.83 (NR)
- 200m Breaststroke (Long Course): 2:33.13 (NR)
- 50m Breaststroke (Short Course): 30.15 sec (NR)
