= Wickus Nienaber =

Swazi swimmer (born 1981)

Personal information
- Full name: Wickus Nienaber
- National team: Swaziland
- Born: 24 June 1981 (age 45) Manzini, Swaziland
- Height: 1.91 m (6 ft 3 in)
- Weight: 85 kg (187 lb)

Sport
- Sport: Swimming
- Strokes: Breaststroke
- College team: Florida State University (U.S.)
- Coach: Neil Harper (U.S.)

Wickus Nienaber (born June 24, 1981) is a former Swazi swimmer, who specialized in breaststroke events. He is a four-time College Swimmer of the Year, a 2004 Atlantic Coast Conference champion, and owns at least 40 national age group records for the same stroke in Swaziland. He was a member of the swimming team for Florida State Seminoles under his coach Neil Harper, and a graduate with a Doctorate in computer science at the Florida State University in Tallahassee, Florida.

Nienaber made his first Swazi team at the 2000 Summer Olympics in Sydney, where he competed in the men's 100 m breaststroke. Swimming in heat three, he touched out Namibia's Jorg Lindemeier to take a third spot and forty-seventh overall by 0.27 of a second in 1:04.98.

At the 2004 Summer Olympics in Athens, Nienaber qualified again for the men's 100 m breaststroke by eclipsing a FINA B-standard entry time of 1:04.22 from the FINA World Championships in Barcelona, Spain. He challenged seven other swimmers on the fourth heat, including Olympic veterans Ratapong Sirisanont of Thailand, Malick Fall of Senegal, and Jakob Jóhann Sveinsson of Iceland. He raced to sixth place by 0.03 of a second behind Barbados' Bradley Ally in 1:04.74. Nienaber failed to advance into the semifinals, as he placed forty-second overall on the first day of preliminaries.
