= Morgan Knabe =

Canadian swimmer (born 1981)

Personal information
- Full name: Morgan Knabe
- National team: Canada
- Born: May 20, 1981 (age 45) Calgary, Alberta
- Height: 1.83 m (6 ft 0 in)
- Weight: 85 kg (187 lb)

Sport
- Sport: Swimming
- Strokes: Breaststroke
- College team: University of Calgary
Medal record
Men's swimming
Representing Canada
World Championships (SC)
Bronze medal – third place	1999 Hong Kong	100 m breaststroke
Pan Pacific Championships
Silver medal – second place	1999 Sydney	4x100 m medley
Bronze medal – third place	1997 Fukuoka	4x100 m medley
Bronze medal – third place	1999 Sydney	100 m breaststroke
Commonwealth Games
Silver medal – second place	2002 Manchester	100 m breaststroke
Bronze medal – third place	2002 Manchester	4 x 100 m medley
Pan American Games
Gold medal – first place	1999 Winnipeg	200 m breaststroke
Silver medal – second place	1999 Winnipeg	100 m breaststroke
Bronze medal – third place	1999 Winnipeg	4x100 m medley

Morgan Knabe (born May 20, 1981) is a former breaststroke swimmer from Canada, who competed for his native country at two consecutive Summer Olympics, starting in 2000 (2000 - Sydney, AUS and 2004 - Athens, GR). His best Olympic results were a sixth place in the 100-metre breaststroke, and with the men's 4x100-metre medley relay in Sydney, Australia.

Knabe is known to be outspoken, being forced to apologize after "accusing Olympic gold medallist Domenico Fioravanti of using drugs and saying he wanted to punch the Italian swimmer in the face".

After retiring from competitive swimming, Knabe went into coaching. He is currently based in Brisbane as the head coach of Lawnton Swim Club.

== See also ==
- List of Commonwealth Games medallists in swimming (men)
