= Roman Sludnov =

Russian swimmer

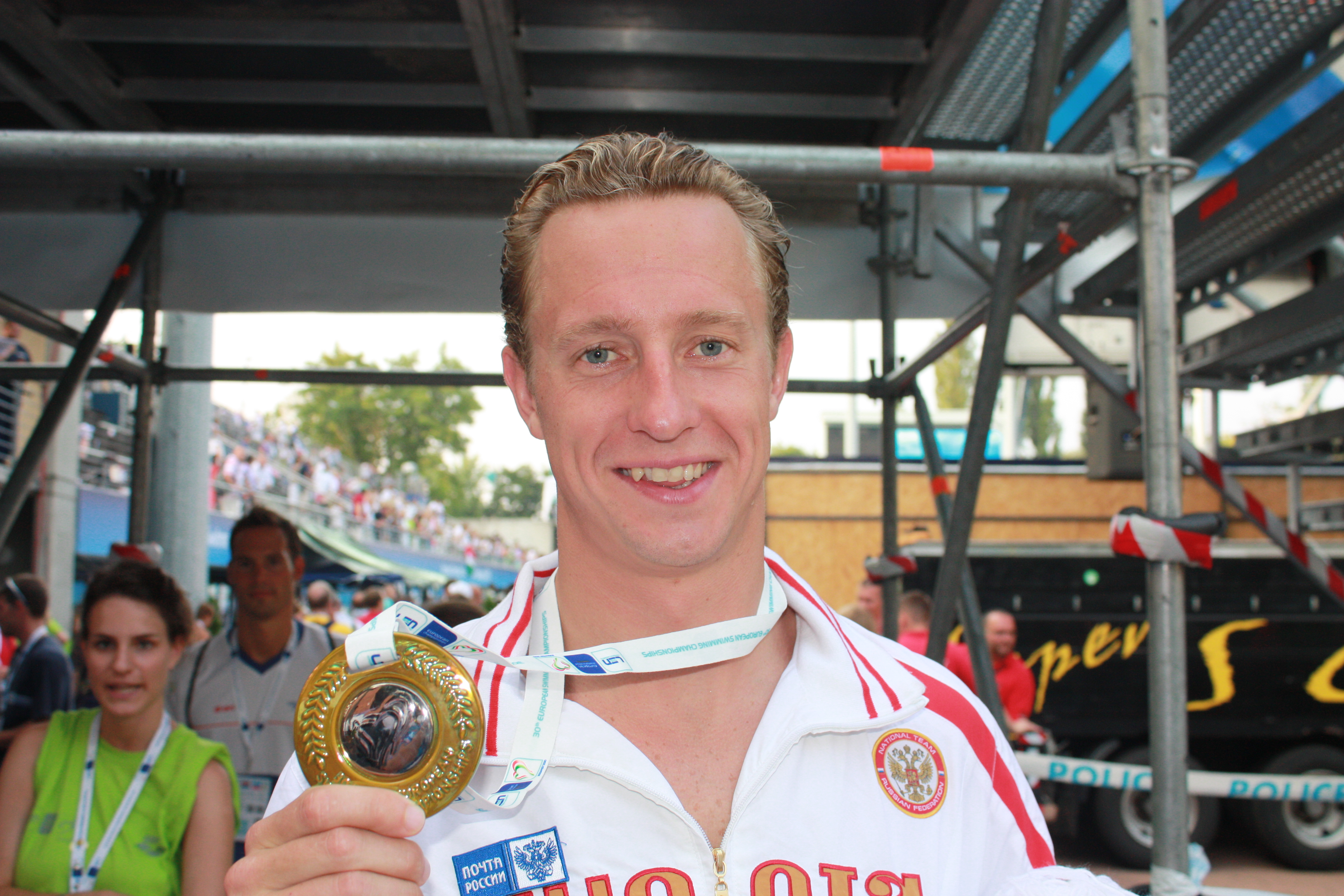
- Sludnov in 2010.

Personal information
- Full name: Roman Andreyevich Sludnov
- Nationality: Russia
- Born: 4 February 1980 (age 46) Omsk, Russian SFSR, Soviet Union
- Height: 1.88 m (6 ft 2 in)
- Weight: 74 kg (163 lb)

Sport
- Sport: Swimming
- Strokes: Breaststroke
- Club: SDYuShOR, Omsk
- College team: Missouri State Bears USA
- Coach: Natalia Roshchina RUS
Medal record
Representing Russia
Olympic Games
Bronze medal – third place	2000 Sydney	100 m breaststroke
World Championships (LC)
Gold medal – first place	2001 Fukuoka	100 m breaststroke
Silver medal – second place	2001 Fukuoka	50 m breaststroke
Bronze medal – third place	2007 Melbourne	4×100 m medley
World Championships (SC)
Gold medal – first place	2000 Athens	100 m breaststroke
Gold medal – first place	2000 Athens	200 m breaststroke
European Championships (LC)
Gold medal – first place	2002 Berlin	4×100 m medley
Gold medal – first place	2006 Budapest	100 m breaststroke
Gold medal – first place	2006 Budapest	4×100 m medley
Silver medal – second place	2002 Berlin	100 m breaststroke
Silver medal – second place	2010 Budapest	4×100 m medley
Bronze medal – third place	2002 Berlin	200 m breaststroke
European Championships (SC)
Gold medal – first place	1999 Lisbon	100 m breaststroke
Gold medal – first place	2004 Vienna	100 m breaststroke
Silver medal – second place	2004 Vienna	50 m breaststroke
Bronze medal – third place	1999 Lisbon	50 m breaststroke

Roman Andreyevich Sludnov (Russian: Роман Андреевич Слуднов, born 24 February 1980) is a breaststroke swimmer from Russia. He was the first person to swim the long course 100 m breaststroke under one minute. In 2000 he held world records in the long course 100 m and short course 100 m and 200 m. At the 2000 Olympics, he won a bronze medal in the 100 m event.

== Biography ==
Sludnov has a younger brother Artyom (born 1981) who won a national title in breaststroke in 1999. His parents, Natalia Roshchina and Andrei Sludnov, are elite swimming coaches and were taking both sons to their training sessions since early age. Sludnov learned to swim aged four, started training at seven, won his first title aged fourteen, and by 1997 was selected to the national team.

In the 2000s Sludnov's brothers were studying in the United States. Roman graduated from the University of Missouri in 2009 with a degree in finances and continues to study and train in Orlando, Florida.

== Career ==
Sludnov was the first person to break the one minute barrier for the long course 100 m breaststroke, clocking a 59.97 at the Russian National Championships and World Championship Trials in Moscow on 29 June 2001. The day before, he beat the world record at 1:00.26. Less than a month later, Sludnov clocked 59.94 at the 2001 World Championships. He competed at the 2008 Summer Olympics, but could not match his bronze medal-winning performance from Sydney and finished in sixth place.

He swam for Russia at the:

- Olympics: 2000, 2004, 2008, 2012
- World Championships: 2001, 2007, 2011
- European Championships: 2002, 2006, 2010
- Short Course Worlds: 2000
- Short Course Europeans: 1999, 2004

Records
Preceded by Pieter van den Hoogenband	European Swimmer of the Year; 2001	Succeeded by Pieter van den Hoogenband
