= Domenico Fioravanti =

Italian swimmer (born 1977)

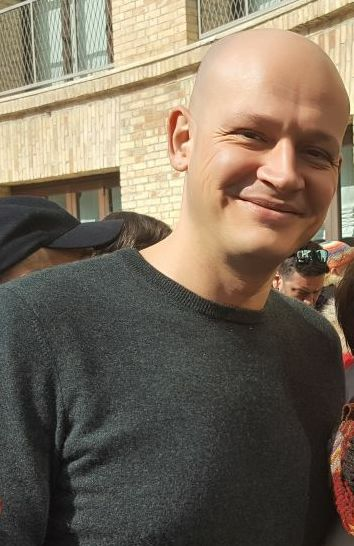

Personal information
- Full name: Domenico Fioravanti
- Nationality: Italy
- Born: 31 May 1977 (age 49) Trecate, Piedmont
- Height: 1.79 m (5 ft 10 in)

Sport
- Sport: Swimming
- Strokes: Breaststroke
- Club: Gruppo Sportivo Fiamme Gialle; Nuoto Club Verona
Medal record
Event	1st	2nd	3rd
Olympic Games	2	0	0
World Championships (LC)	0	1	1
World Championships (SC)	0	1	0
European Championships (LC)	2	1	0
European Championships (SC)	2	3	0
Mediterranean Games	2	1	0
Goodwill Games	0	0	1
Total	8	7	2
Olympic Games
Gold medal – first place	2000 Sydney	100 m breaststroke
Gold medal – first place	2000 Sydney	200 m breaststroke
World Championships (LC)
Silver medal – second place	2001 Fukuoka	100 m breaststroke
Bronze medal – third place	2001 Fukuoka	50 m breaststroke
World Championships (SC)
Silver medal – second place	1999 Hong Kong	100 m breaststroke
European Championships (LC)
Gold medal – first place	1999 Istanbul	100 m breaststroke
Gold medal – first place	2000 Helsinki	100 m breaststroke
Silver medal – second place	2000 Helsinki	200 m breaststroke
European Championships (SC)
Gold medal – first place	2000 Valencia	50 m breaststroke
Gold medal – first place	2000 Valencia	100 m breaststroke
Silver medal – second place	2000 Valencia	200 m breaststroke
Mediterranean Games
Gold medal – first place	1997 Bari	100 m breaststroke
Gold medal – first place	1997 Bari	4×100 m medley

Domenico Fioravanti (born 31 May 1977) is a retired Italian competitive swimmer who won two gold medals at the 2000 Summer Olympics in Sydney.

== Career ==
Domenico Fioravanti was born in Trecate, near Novara, Piedmont. He started swimming competitively at the age of nine, and one year later began training daily, spurred by his elder brother Massimiliano, who was also a swimmer. In 1995, he took part in his first European Championship. In 1999, he was European champion in the 100 m breaststroke.

In 2000, Fioravanti became the first Italian swimmer to win a gold medal in the Olympic Games, winning both the 100 m and 200 m breaststroke races. He also won another gold European medal in the 100 m breaststroke. In 2001, he received the silver medal in the 100 m breaststroke and bronze medal in the 50 m breaststroke at the World Championship. Moreover, he won the Italian championship thirty times. In 2004, he was forced to retire from competitive swimming due to a genetic heart anomaly.

== Personal bests ==
In long-course swimming, Fioravanti's personal bests are:

- 50 m breaststroke: 27.72
- 100 m breaststroke: 1:00.46
- 200 m breaststroke: 2:10.87

== See also ==
- Italian swimmers multiple medalists at the international competitions
- List of members of the International Swimming Hall of Fame
