= Arsenio López =

Puerto Rican swimmer (born 1979)

Personal information
- Full name: Arsenio Alexander López; Rosario
- Nickname: "Alex"
- National team: Puerto Rico
- Born: May 3, 1979 (age 47) Humacao, Puerto Rico
- Height: 1.91 m (6 ft 3 in)
- Weight: 84 kg (185 lb)

Sport
- Sport: Swimming
- Strokes: Breaststroke, medley
- Club: Bolles School Swim Club
- College team: University of Florida
- Coach: Gregg Troy

Arsenio Alexander López Rosario (born May 3, 1979), also known as Alex Lopez, is a Puerto Rican former swimmer and three-time Olympian who specialized in breaststroke and individual medley events.

== Early life and education ==
Lopez was born in Humacao, Puerto Rico. He attended the Bolles School in Jacksonville, Florida, where he was a member of the Bolles School Swimming Club. Lopez accepted an athletic scholarship to attend the University of Florida in Gainesville, Florida, where he competed for the Florida Gators swimming and diving team under coach Gregg Troy. He majored in civil engineering at the university.

== Career ==
Lopez made his Olympic debut, as a 17-year-old teen, at the 1996 Summer Olympics in Atlanta. He failed to reach the top 16 final in any of his individual events, finishing twenty-seventh in the 200-meter individual medley (2:06.99) and twenty-fifth in the 400-meter individual medley (4:34.81). He also placed seventeenth, as a member of the Puerto Rican team (including finalist Ricardo Busquets), in the 4×100-meter freestyle relay (3:28.27).

At the 2000 Summer Olympics in Sydney, Lopez decided to drop two of his events from Atlanta and experiment with the 100-meter breaststroke. He finished in a first-place tie with Latvia's Valērijs Kalmikovs on the fourth heat with a time of 1:04.02. In the 200-meter individual medley, he raced to a fourth seed in heat three by 0.07 seconds behind South Korea's Han Kyu-Chul in 2:06.49. Lopez did not qualify for the semifinals, finishing thirty-fourth each in all of his events from the heats.

Lopez shortened his program at the 2004 Summer Olympics in Athens, when he swam only for the 100-meter breaststroke. He cleared a FINA B-standard entry time of 1:04.01 from the 2003 Pan American Games in Santo Domingo, Dominican Republic. He challenged seven other swimmers in the same heat as Sydney, including four-time Olympian Ratapong Sirisanont (Thailand), who was later disqualified for a false start. Lopez posted a time of 1:03.99 to take a second seed by a 1.02-second margin behind winner Jakob Johann Sveinsson of Iceland. Lopez ended his third Olympic stint by sharing a thirty-fifth place tie with New Zealand's Ben Labowitch on the morning prelims.

Lopez latterly moved into sportswear design. He was responsible for the Netherlands strip, worn at the 2022 FIFA World Cup held in Qatar.

== See also ==
- List of University of Florida alumni
- List of University of Florida Olympians
