= Álvaro Fortuny =

Guatemalan swimmer (born 1979)

Álvaro Fortuny López
Personal information
- Full name: Álvaro Fortuny López
- Nationality: Guatemala
- Born: June 17, 1979 (age 47)

Sport
- Sport: Swimming
- Strokes: Breaststroke
- College team: George Washington University (USA) (1996-2001)
Medal record
Representing Guatemala
Central American and Caribbean Games
Bronze medal – third place	1998 Maracaibo	100m breaststroke

Álvaro Fortuny López (born June 17, 1979) is an Olympic breaststroke swimmer from Guatemala. He swam at the 2000 and 2004 Olympics; and was entered in the 2008 Games, but did not compete.

He attended college and swam at the USA's George Washington University.
