= Jean Luc Razakarivony =

Malagasy swimmer

Personal information
- Full name: Jean Luc Razakarivony
- National team: Madagascar
- Born: 10 September 1975 (age 50) Antananarivo, Madagascar
- Height: 1.90 m (6 ft 3 in)
- Weight: 82 kg (181 lb)

Sport
- Sport: Swimming
- Strokes: Breaststroke
- Club: Genève Natation 1885

Jean Luc Razakarivony (born September 10, 1975) is a Malagasy former swimmer, who specialized in breaststroke events. He is a three-time Olympian (1996, 2000, and 2004), a multiple-time Malagasy record holder in the 100 and 200 m breaststroke, and a member of Genève Natation 1885, based in Geneva, Switzerland.

Razakarivony made his first Malagasy team, as a 21-year-old, at the 1996 Summer Olympics in Atlanta. There, he failed to reach the top 16 final in the men's 100 m breaststroke, finishing in forty-first place with a time of 1:07.34.

On his second Olympic appearance in Sydney 2000, Razakarivony edged out Saudi Arabia's Ahmed Al-Kudmani to earn a third spot and fifty-fifth overall in heat one of the 100 m breaststroke by exactly a tenth of a second (0.10), establishing his own lifetime best at 1:05.97.

Razakarivony swam for his third time in the 100 m breaststroke at the 2004 Summer Olympics in Athens. He received a Universality place from FINA in an entry time of 1:07.25. He challenged seven other swimmers in heat two, including Kyrgyzstan's Yevgeny Petrashov, who also competed with the same number of Games. He posted a time of 1:07.74 to save a sixth spot over Petrashov by four hundredths of a second (0.04). Razakarivony ended his third and final Olympic stint with a fifty-fourth-place effort on the first day of preliminaries.
