= Swimming at the 2012 European Aquatics Championships – Men's 100 metre breaststroke =

Men's 100 metre breaststroke at the 2012 European Aquatics Championships
- Dates: May 21, 2012 (heats and semifinals); May 22, 2012 (final)
- Competitors: 59 from 30 nations
- Winning time: 1:00.55

Medalists
gold medal	Fabio Scozzoli	Italy
silver medal	Valeriy Dymo	Ukraine
bronze medal	Mattia Pesce	Italy

The men's 100 metre breaststroke competition of the swimming events at the 2012 European Aquatics Championships took place May 21 and 22. The heats and semifinals took place on May 21, the final on May 22.

== Records ==
Prior to the competition, the existing world, European and championship records were as follows.

	Name	Nation	Time	Location	Date
World record	Brenton Rickard	Australia	58.58	Rome	July 27, 2009
European record	Hugues Duboscq	France	58.64	Rome	July 27, 2009
Championship record	Alexander Dale Oen	Norway	59.20	Budapest	August 10, 2010

== Results ==
=== Heats ===
59 swimmers participated in 8 heats.

Rank	Heat	Lane	Name	Nationality	Time	Notes
1	4	4	Imri Ganiel	Israel	1:00.96	Q, NR
2	8	5	Damir Dugonjič	Slovenia	1:01.13	Q
3	8	4	Fabio Scozzoli	Italy	1:01.14	Q
4	7	5	Mattia Pesce	Italy	1:01.21	Q
5	6	6	Valeriy Dymo	Ukraine	1:01.28	Q
6	8	2	Kirill Strelnikov	Russia	1:01.40	Q
7	8	7	Flavio Bizzarri	Italy	1:01.46	
8	7	4	Hugues Duboscq	France	1:01.54	Q
9	6	4	Christian vom Lehn	Germany	1:01.55	Q
10	8	1	Martin Liivamägi	Estonia	1:01.63	Q
11	7	6	Igor Borysik	Ukraine	1:01.67	Q
12	7	2	Carlos Esteves Almeida	Portugal	1:01.72	Q
13	6	7	Laurent Carnol	Luxembourg	1:01.75	Q
14	6	1	Andriy Kovalenko	Ukraine	1:01.80	
15	8	6	Marco Koch	Germany	1:01.81	Q
16	5	4	Martti Aljand	Estonia	1:01.85	Q
17	7	8	Petr Bartůněk	Czech Republic	1:01.89	Q
17	8	8	Hunor Mate	Austria	1:01.89	Q
19	6	5	Anton Lobanov	Russia	1:01.90	
19	7	1	Čaba Silađi	Serbia	1:01.90	
19	8	3	Panagiotis Samilidis	Greece	1:01.90	
22	5	2	Gal Nevo	Israel	1:01.95	
23	6	3	Dawid Szulich	Poland	1:01.99	
24	4	2	Eetu Karvonen	Finland	1:02.09	
25	4	3	Tomáš Klobučník	Slovakia	1:02.16	NR
26	3	1	Aleksander Hetland	Norway	1:02.17	
27	3	5	Matti Mattsson	Finland	1:02.18	
28	7	7	Jakob Jóhann Sveinsson	Iceland	1:02.19	
29	5	5	Yannick Käser	Switzerland	1:02.20	
30	6	2	Matjaž Markič	Slovenia	1:02.23	
31	6	8	Gábor Financsek	Hungary	1:02.32	
32	4	8	Emil Tahirovič	Slovenia	1:02.41	
33	5	6	Danila Artiomov	Moldova	1:02.47	
34	7	3	Dragos Agache	Romania	1:02.51	
35	4	1	Viktar Vabishchevich	Belarus	1:02.61	
35	4	5	Johannes Skagius	Sweden	1:02.61	
37	4	6	Martin Schweizer	Switzerland	1:02.74	
38	3	2	Filipp Provorkov	Estonia	1:02.82	
39	5	8	Árni Már Árnason	Iceland	1:02.96	
40	5	7	Ömer Aslanoğlu	Turkey	1:03.04	
41	3	6	Sławomir Kuczko	Poland	1:03.08	
42	3	8	Oleg Kostin	Russia	1:03.23	
43	3	4	Robert Vovk	Slovenia	1:03.30	
44	3	3	Yaron Shagalov	Israel	1:03.34	
45	2	3	Sverre Næss	Norway	1:03.44	
46	2	7	Vadim Romanov	Estonia	1:03.61	
47	2	1	Filip Wypych	Poland	1:03.62	
48	1	3	Tomáš Fučík	Czech Republic	1:03.71	
49	2	5	Vaidotas Blažys	Lithuania	1:03.72	
50	5	3	Olexiy Rozhkov	Ukraine	1:03.74	
51	2	2	Ante Krizan	Croatia	1:04.12	
52	3	7	Sasa Gerbec	Slovenia	1:04.14	
53	2	4	Lachezar Shumkov	Bulgaria	1:04.53	
54	4	7	Maxim Podoprigora	Austria	1:04.62	
55	1	4	Marius Mikalauskas	Lithuania	1:05.01	
56	1	5	Marek Botik	Slovakia	1:05.05	
57	2	6	Uldis Tazans	Latvia	1:05.15	
58	2	8	Daniel Vacval	Slovakia	1:05.23	
	5	1	Jowan Qupty	Israel	DSQ	

=== Semifinals ===
The eight fastest riders advanced to the final.

==== Semifinal 1 ====
Rank	Lane	Name	Nationality	Time	Notes
1	4	Damir Dugonjič	Slovenia	1:00.64	Q
2	5	Mattia Pesce	Italy	1:00.72	Q
3	3	Kirill Strelnikov	Russia	1:01.29	Q
4	2	Igor Borysik	Ukraine	1:01.34	
5	6	Christian vom Lehn	Germany	1:01.50	
6	7	Laurent Carnol	Luxembourg	1:01.68	
7	1	Martti Aljand	Estonia	1:01.79	
8	8	Hunor Mate	Austria	1:02.25	

==== Semifinal 2 ====
Rank	Lane	Name	Nationality	Time	Notes
1	5	Fabio Scozzoli	Italy	1:00.90	Q
2	4	Imri Ganiel	Israel	1:01.01	Q
3	1	Marco Koch	Germany	1:01.19	Q
4	7	Carlos Esteves Almeida	Portugal	1:01.19	Q, NR
5	3	Valeriy Dymo	Ukraine	1:01.29	Q
6	6	Hugues Duboscq	France	1:01.35	
7	2	Martin Liivamägi	Estonia	1:01.66	
8	8	Petr Bartůněk	Czech Republic	1:01.68	

=== Final ===
The final was held at 17:29.

Rank	Lane	Name	Nationality	Time	Notes
1st place, gold medalist(s)	3	Fabio Scozzoli	Italy	1:00.55	
2nd place, silver medalist(s)	8	Valeriy Dymo	Ukraine	1:00.68	
3rd place, bronze medalist(s)	5	Mattia Pesce	Italy	1:00.93	
4	2	Marco Koch	Germany	1:00.99	
5	1	Kirill Strelnikov	Russia	1:01.12	
6	6	Imri Ganiel	Israel	1:01.33	
7	4	Damir Dugonjič	Slovenia	1:01.51	
8	7	Carlos Esteves Almeida	Portugal	1:01.57	
