= Swimming at the 2012 European Aquatics Championships – Men's 4 × 100 metre medley relay =

Men's 4 × 100 metre medley relay at the 2012 European Aquatics Championships
- Dates: May 27, 2012 (heats and final)
- Competitors: 77 from 17 nations
- Winning time: 3:32.80

Medalists
gold medal	Mirco Di Tora; Fabio Scozzoli; Matteo Rivolta; Filippo Magnini	Italy
silver medal	Helge Meeuw; Christian vom Lehn; Steffen Deibler; Marco di Carli	Germany
bronze medal	Péter Bernek; Dániel Gyurta; László Cseh; Dominik Kozma	Hungary

The men's 4 × 100 metre medley relay competition of the swimming events at the 2012 European Aquatics Championships took place May 27. The heats and final took place on May 27.

== Records ==
Prior to the competition, the existing world, European and championship records were as follows.

	Nation	Time	Location	Date
World record	United States	3:27.28	Rome	August 2, 2009
European record	Germany	3:28.58	Rome	August 2, 2009
Championship record	France	3:31.32	Budapest	August 15, 2010

== Results ==
=== Heats ===
18 nations participated in 3 heats.

Rank	Heat	Lane	Name	Nationality	Time	Notes
1	3	2	Christian Diener; Christian vom Lehn; Steffen Deibler; Dimitri Colupaev	Germany	3:36.66	Q
2	3	6	Péter Bernek; Dániel Gyurta; Bence Pulai; Dominik Kozma	Hungary	3:36.94	Q
3	2	4	Vitaly Borisov; Kirill Strelnikov; Nikita Konovalov; Oleg Tikhobaev	Russia	3:37.47	Q
4	2	2	Yakov-Yan Toumarkin; Imri Ganiel; Alon Mandel; Nimrod Shapira Bar-Or	Israel	3:38.04	Q
5	1	7	Benjamin Stasiulis; Hugues Duboscq; Romain Sassot; Medhy Metella	France	3:38.33	Q
6	3	7	Aristeidis Grigoriadis; Panagiotis Samildis; Stefanos Dimitriadis; Kristian Golomeev	Greece	3:38.53	Q
7	3	3	Matteo Milli; Mattia Pesce; Piero Codia; Andrea Rolla	Italy	3:38.59	Q
8	2	5	Pavel Sankovich; Viktar Vabishchevich; Yauhen Tsurkin; Arseni Kukharau	Belarus	3:39.65	Q
9	1	3	Simon Sjödin; Johannes Skagius; Lars Frölander; Petter Stymne	Sweden	3:39.69	
10	3	5	Radosław Kawęcki; Dawid Szulich; Michal Poprawa; Filip Wypych	Poland	3:39.80	
11	3	4	Pedro Oliveira; Carlos Esteves Almeida; Simão Morgado; Tiago Venâncio	Portugal	3:40.19	NR
12	1	2	Lavrans Solli; Aleksander Hetland; Sindri Thor Jakobssen; Gard Kvale	Norway	3:40.57	NR
13	1	4	Markus Rogan; Hunor Mate; Dinko Jukić; Martin Spitzer	Austria	3:40.58	
14	2	7	Martin Baďura; Petr Bartůněk; Jan Šefl; Martin Verner	Czech Republic	3:41.04	
15	1	5	Andres Olvik; Martti Aljand; Martin Liivamägi; Pjotr Degtjarjov	Estonia	3:41.06	NR
16	2	6	Jonathan Massacand; Yannick Käser; Nico van Duijn; Flori Land	Switzerland	3:41.15	
17	1	6	Matas Andriekus; Vaidotas Blažys; Edgaras Štura; Mindaugas Sadauskas	Lithuania	3:46.62	
	2	3		Serbia	DNS	

=== Final ===
The final was held at 18:16.

Rank	Lane	Name	Nationality	Time	Notes
1st place, gold medalist(s)	1	Mirco Di Tora; Fabio Scozzoli; Matteo Rivolta; Filippo Magnini	Italy	3:32.80	NR
2nd place, silver medalist(s)	4	Helge Meeuw; Christian vom Lehn; Steffen Deibler; Marco di Carli	Germany	3:34.41	
3rd place, bronze medalist(s)	5	Péter Bernek; Dániel Gyurta; László Cseh; Dominik Kozma	Hungary	3:34.57	NR
4	2	Benjamin Stasiulis; Hugues Duboscq; Romain Sassot; Alain Bernard	France	3:35.41	
5	3	Vitaly Borisov; Kirill Strelnikov; Nikita Konovalov; Vitaly Syrnikov	Russia	3:36.01	
6	7	Aristeidis Grigoriadis; Panagiotis Samildis; Stefanos Dimitriadis; Kristian Golomeev	Greece	3:37.24	
7	6	Yakov-Yan Toumarkin; Imri Ganiel; Alon Mandel; Nimrod Shapira Bar-Or	Israel	3:37.77	
8	8	Pavel Sankovich; Viktar Vabishchevich; Yauhen Tsurkin; Arseni Kukharau	Belarus	3:41.17	
