= Swimming at the 2012 European Aquatics Championships – Men's 50 metre breaststroke =

Men's 50 metre breaststroke at the 2012 European Aquatics Championships
- Dates: May 25, 2012 (heats and semifinals); May 26, 2012 (final)
- Competitors: 52 from 27 nations
- Winning time: 27.32

Medalists
gold medal	Damir Dugonjič	Slovenia
silver medal	Fabio Scozzoli	Italy
bronze medal	Panagiotis Samilidis	Greece

The men's 50 metre breaststroke competition of the swimming events at the 2012 European Aquatics Championships took place May 25 and 26. The heats and semifinals took place on May 25, the final on May 26.

== Records ==
Prior to the competition, the existing world, European and championship records were as follows.

	Name	Nation	Time	Location	Date
World record	Cameron van der Burgh	South Africa	26.67	Rome	July 29, 2009
European record	Hendrik Feldwehr	Germany	26.83	Rome	July 28, 2009
Championship record	Oleg Lisogor	Ukraine	27.18	Berlin	August 2, 2002

== Results ==
=== Heats ===
52 swimmers participated in 7 heats.

Rank	Heat	Lane	Name	Nationality	Time	Notes
1	5	4	Damir Dugonjič	Slovenia	27.36	Q
2	7	4	Fabio Scozzoli	Italy	27.56	Q
3	7	5	Mattia Pesce	Italy	27.78	Q
4	6	4	Matjaž Markič	Slovenia	27.81	Q
5	6	3	Panagiotis Samilidis	Greece	27.93	Q
5	7	7	Filipp Provorkov	Estonia	27.93	Q, NR
7	5	1	Valeriy Dymo	Ukraine	27.94	Q
8	5	5	Aleksander Hetland	Norway	27.97	Q
9	5	3	Čaba Silađi	Serbia	27.99	Q
10	6	7	Gábor Financsek	Hungary	28.01	Q
11	6	5	Dragos Agache	Romania	28.02	Q
12	5	8	Viktar Vabishchevich	Belarus	28.03	Q, NR
13	7	3	Petr Bartůněk	Czech Republic	28.05	Q
14	7	2	Emil Tahirovič	Slovenia	28.09	Q scratched
15	4	4	Eetu Karvonen	Finland	28.20	Q
15	6	6	Kirill Strelnikov	Russia	28.20	Q
17	5	7	Dawid Szulich	Poland	28.21	
18	5	2	Martin Schweizer	Switzerland	28.22	
19	4	3	Robert Vovk	Slovenia	28.38	
20	4	6	Ante Krizan	Croatia	28.40	
20	7	6	Ömer Aslanoğlu	Turkey	28.40	
22	4	5	Carlos Esteves Almeida	Portugal	28.43	NR
22	6	2	Andriy Kovalenko	Ukraine	28.43	
24	4	8	Johannes Skagius	Sweden	28.44	
25	5	6	Anton Lobanov	Russia	28.45	
26	3	3	Tomáš Klobučník	Slovakia	28.50	
26	4	2	Sasa Gerbec	Croatia	28.50	
28	6	8	Laurent Carnol	Luxembourg	28.57	NR
29	4	7	Filip Wypych	Poland	28.60	
30	7	8	Yaron Shagalov	Israel	28.61	
31	3	8	Tamás Szabó	Hungary	28.66	
32	6	1	Marek Botik	Slovakia	28.72	
33	3	7	Imri Ganiel	Israel	28.78	
34	3	6	Ari-Pekka Liukkonen	Finland	28.83	
35	3	5	Igor Borysik	Ukraine	28.84	
36	3	2	Matti Mattsson	Finland	28.85	
37	2	6	Sverre Næss	Norway	28.86	
37	3	4	Yannick Kaeser	Switzerland	28.86	
39	7	1	Hunor Mate	Austria	28.88	
40	2	7	Oleg Kostin	Russia	28.91	
40	3	1	Danila Artiomov	Moldova	28.91	
42	2	2	Vaidotas Blažys	Lithuania	29.09	
43	2	3	Martin Baďura	Czech Republic	29.23	
44	1	4	Daniel Vacval	Slovakia	29.32	
45	4	1	Matej Kuchar	Slovakia	29.42	
46	2	8	Lachezar Shumkov	Bulgaria	29.45	
47	2	4	Jowan Qupty	Israel	29.53	
48	2	1	Uldis Tazans	Latvia	29.55	
49	2	5	Maxim Podoprigora	Austria	29.59	
50	1	3	Olexiy Rozhkov	Ukraine	29.65	
51	1	5	Ákos Molnár	Hungary	30.42	
52	1	6	Marius Mikalauskas	Lithuania	30.66	

=== Semifinals ===
The eight fasters swimmers advanced to the final.

==== Semifinal 1 ====
Rank	Lane	Name	Nationality	Time	Notes
1	5	Matjaž Markič	Slovenia	27.43	Q
2	6	Aleksander Hetland	Norway	27.68	Q
3	4	Fabio Scozzoli	Italy	27.73	Q
4	3	Filipp Provorkov	Estonia	28.07	
5	8	Dawid Szulich	Poland	28.08	
6	2	Gábor Financsek	Hungary	28.13	
7	1	Eetu Karvonen	Finland	28.26	
7	7	Viktar Vabishchevich	Belarus	28.26	

==== Semifinal 2 ====
Rank	Lane	Name	Nationality	Time	Notes
1	4	Damir Dugonjič	Slovenia	27.60	Q
2	5	Mattia Pesce	Italy	27.63	Q
3	1	Petr Bartůněk	Czech Republic	27.89	Q
4	3	Panagiotis Samilidis	Greece	27.92	Q
5	6	Valeriy Dymo	Ukraine	27.99	
5	7	Dragos Agache	Romania	27.99	
7	2	Čaba Silađi	Serbia	28.04	
8	8	Kirill Strelnikov	Russia	28.25	

==== Swim-off ====
A swim-off was needed to determine the last participant in the final.

Rank	Lane	Name	Nationality	Time	Notes
1	4	Dragos Agache	Romania	28.14	Q
2	5	Valeriy Dymo	Ukraine	28.26	

=== Final ===
The final was held at 18:30.

Rank	Lane	Name	Nationality	Time	Notes
1st place, gold medalist(s)	5	Damir Dugonjič	Slovenia	27.32	
2nd place, silver medalist(s)	2	Fabio Scozzoli	Italy	27.49	
3rd place, bronze medalist(s)	1	Panagiotis Samilidis	Greece	27.64	
4	3	Mattia Pesce	Italy	27.65	
5	4	Matjaž Markič	Slovenia	27.67	
6	6	Aleksander Hetland	Norway	27.82	
7	8	Dragos Agache	Romania	27.84	
8	7	Petr Bartůněk	Czech Republic	27.89	
