= Swimming at the 2012 European Aquatics Championships – Men's 200 metre breaststroke =

Men's 200 metre breaststroke at the 2012 European Aquatics Championships
- Dates: May 23, 2012 (heats and semifinals); May 24, 2012 (final)
- Competitors: 39 from 25 nations
- Winning time: 2:08.60

Medalists
gold medal	Dániel Gyurta	Hungary
silver medal	Marco Koch	Germany
bronze medal	Panagiotis Samilidis	Greece

The men's 200 metre breaststroke competition of the swimming events at the 2012 European Aquatics Championships took place on May 23 and 24. The heats and semifinals took place on May 23, with the final held on May 24.

== Records ==
Prior to the competition, the existing world, European and championship records were as follows.

	Name	Nation	Time	Location	Date
World record	Christian Sprenger	Australia	2:07.31	Rome	July 30, 2009
European record	Dániel Gyurta	Hungary	2:07.64	Beijing	July 31, 2009
Championship record	Dániel Gyurta	Hungary	2:08.95	Budapest	August 12, 2010

== Results ==
=== Heats ===
40 swimmers participated in 5 heats.

Rank	Heat	Lane	Name	Nationality	Time	Notes
1	5	6	Panagiotis Samilidis	Greece	2:10.61	Q, NR
2	5	4	Dániel Gyurta	Hungary	2:11.54	Q
3	4	3	Marco Koch	Germany	2:12.48	Q
4	5	3	Igor Borysik	Ukraine	2:12.60	Q
5	4	5	Ákos Molnár	Hungary	2:12.71	Q
6	3	6	Flavio Bizzarri	Italy	2:13.00	Q
6	5	5	Michael Jamieson	Great Britain	2:13.00	Q
8	4	2	Matti Mattsson	Finland	2:13.26	Q
9	3	4	Laurent Carnol	Luxembourg	2:13.36	Q
10	4	4	Christian vom Lehn	Germany	2:13.42	Q
11	4	1	Sławomir Kuczko	Poland	2:13.86	Q
12	3	5	Anton Lobanov	Russia	2:13.87	Q
13	2	3	Tomáš Klobučník	Slovakia	2:14.06	Q, NR
14	3	2	Yannick Kaeser	Switzerland	2:14.11	Q
15	5	7	Oleg Kostin	Russia	2:14.13	Q
16	4	7	Olexiy Rozhkov	Ukraine	2:14.37	Q
17	4	6	Maxym Shemberyev	Ukraine	2:14.38	
18	5	1	Jonas Coreelman	Belgium	2:14.52	
19	3	7	Hunor Mate	Austria	2:14.79	
20	3	3	Hugues Duboscq	France	2:15.02	
21	1	5	Martin Liivamägi	Estonia	2:15.21	NR
22	2	5	Carlos Esteves Almeida	Portugal	2:15.64	
23	2	2	Imri Ganiel	Israel	2:15.76	
24	2	1	Irakli Bolkvadze	Georgia	2:16.35	
25	2	6	Jowan Qupty	Israel	2:16.72	
25	3	1	Maxim Podoprigora	Austria	2:16.72	
27	3	8	Danila Artiomov	Moldova	2:17.77	
28	4	8	Mattia Petce	Italy	2:17.80	
29	1	2	Vadim Romanov	Estonia	2:18.40	
30	2	4	Eetu Karvonen	Finland	2:19.39	
31	1	4	Sverre Naess	Norway	2:20.02	
32	1	3	Robert Vovk	Slovenia	2:20.25	
33	2	8	Rok Resman	Slovenia	2:20.63	
34	1	7	Lachezar Shumkov	Bulgaria	2:21.51	
35	1	6	Marius Mikalauskas	Lithuania	2:21.61	
36	1	1	Tal Hanani	Israel	2:23.73	
	5	2	Valeriy Dymo	Ukraine	DSQ	
	5	8	Jakob Jóhann Sveinsson	Iceland	DSQ	
	1	8	Aleksander Hetland	Norway	DNF	
	2	7	Gal Nevo	Israel	DNS	

=== Semifinals ===
The eight fasters swimmers advanced to the final.

==== Semifinal 1 ====
Rank	Lane	Name	Nationality	Time	Notes
1	4	Dániel Gyurta	Hungary	2:10.06	Q
2	5	Igor Borysik	Ukraine	2:11.91	Q
3	3	Flavio Bizzarri	Italy	2:12.03	Q
4	1	Yannick Kaeser	Switzerland	2:12.09	Q, NR
5	2	Christian vom Lehn	Germany	2:12.16	Q
6	7	Anton Lobanov	Russia	2:12.54	
7	6	Matti Mattsson	Finland	2:13.49	
8	8	Olexiy Rozhkov	Ukraine	2:13.91	

==== Semifinal 2 ====
Rank	Lane	Name	Nationality	Time	Notes
1	5	Marco Koch	Germany	2:10.92	Q
2	4	Panagiotis Samilidis	Greece	2:11.53	Q
3	3	Ákos Molnár	Hungary	2:12.23	Q
4	2	Laurent Carnol	Luxembourg	2:12.29	
5	8	Oleg Kostin	Russia	2:12.39	
6	6	Michael Jamieson	Great Britain	2:12.58	
7	1	Tomáš Klobučník	Slovakia	2:13.10	NR
8	7	Sławomir Kuczko	Poland	2:13.14	

=== Final ===
The final was held at 17:41.

Rank	Lane	Name	Nationality	Time	Notes
1st place, gold medalist(s)	4	Dániel Gyurta	Hungary	2:08.60	CR
2nd place, silver medalist(s)	5	Marco Koch	Germany	2:09.26	
3rd place, bronze medalist(s)	3	Panagiotis Samilidis	Greece	2:09.72	NR
4	1	Christian vom Lehn	Germany	2:10.61	
5	2	Flavio Bizzarri	Italy	2.12.47	
6	6	Igor Borysik	Ukraine	2:12.51	
7	7	Yannick Kaeser	Switzerland	2:13.23	
8	8	Ákos Molnár	Hungary	2:13.33	
