= 2012 FINA World Swimming Championships (25 m) – Men's 50 metre breaststroke =

Men's 50m Breaststroke at the 2012 Short Course Worlds
- Dates: 15 December (heats and semifinals); 16 December (final)
- Winning time: 26.30

Medalists
gold medal	Aleksander Hetland	Norway
silver medal	Damir Dugonjič	Slovenia
bronze medal	Florent Manaudou	France

The men's 50 metre breaststroke event at the 11th FINA World Swimming Championships (25m) took place 15 – 16 December 2012 at the Sinan Erdem Dome.

== Records ==
Prior to this competition, the existing world and championship records were as follows:

	Name	Nation	Time	Location	Date
World record	Cameron van der Burgh	South Africa	25.25	Berlin	14 November 2009
Championship record	Felipe França Silva	Brazil	25.95	Dubai	19 December 2010

No new records were set during this competition.

== Results ==
=== Heats ===
Rank	Heat	Lane	Name	Time	Notes
1	11	4	Aleksander Hetland (NOR)	26.60	Q
2	10	4	Florent Manaudou (FRA)	26.67	Q
3	12	3	Felipe Lima (BRA)	26.72	Q
4	11	8	Barry Murphy (IRL)	26.76	Q
5	9	8	Kevin Cordes (USA)	26.77	Q
5	10	5	Sergey Geybel (RUS)	26.77	Q
7	11	5	João Gomes Jr. (BRA)	26.83	Q
7	11	3	Mattia Pesce (ITA)	26.83	Q
9	9	5	Mihail Alexandrov (USA)	26.91	Q
10	12	5	Damir Dugonjič (SLO)	26.92	Q
11	8	6	Giulio Zorzi (RSA)	26.93	Q
11	12	6	Petr Bartůněk (CZE)	26.93	Q
13	10	6	Koichiro Okazaki (JPN)	26.98	Q
14	10	3	Li Xiayan (CHN)	27.03	Q
15	10	2	Emil Tahirovič (SLO)	27.18	Q
16	12	4	Fabio Scozzoli (ITA)	27.21	
17	12	2	Sasa Gerbec (CRO)	27.22	Q
18	12	7	Craig Benson (GBR)	27.28	
19	11	6	Eetu Karvonen (FIN)	27.29	
20	9	4	Giedrius Titenis (LTU)	27.37	
21	10	7	Viktar Vabishchevich (BLR)	27.43	
22	11	7	Martin Melconian (URU)	27.46	NR
23	11	2	Anton Lobanov (RUS)	27.47	
23	12	8	Jorge Murillo (COL)	27.47	NR
25	11	1	Filipp Provorkov (EST)	27.48	
26	12	9	Valeriy Dymo (UKR)	27.54	
27	3	8	Édgar Crespo (PAN)	27.56	
27	9	2	Andrew Poznikoff (CAN)	27.56	
29	12	1	Abraham McLeod (TRI)	27.58	
30	10	8	Akihiro Yamaguchi (JPN)	27.62	
31	12	0	Ihor Borysyk (UKR)	27.63	
32	10	1	Mustafa Kacmaz (TUR)	27.85	
33	9	6	Indra Gunawan (INA)	27.90	
34	10	9	Laurent Carnol (LUX)	27.94	NR
35	10	0	Nikolajs Maskalenko (LAT)	28.01	NR
36	11	0	Ömer Arslanoğlu (TUR)	28.03	
37	8	4	Vaidotas Blažys (LTU)	28.06	
38	9	1	Pjotr Degtjarjov (EST)	28.08	
39	7	6	Malick Fall (SEN)	28.09	
40	9	7	Warren Barnes (CAN)	28.10	
41	9	3	Uldis Tazans (LAT)	28.23	
42	11	9	Lionel Khoo (SIN)	28.26	
43	9	9	Dmitrii Aleksandrov (KGZ)	28.30	
44	2	5	Huang Yunkun (CHN)	28.32	
45	3	2	Dmitriy Balandin (KAZ)	28.36	
46	8	5	Eladio Carrión (PUR)	28.43	NR
47	2	4	Joshua Hall (PHI)	28.69	
48	3	6	Abdulrahman Albader (KUW)	28.86	
49	7	7	Lefkios Xanthou (CYP)	29.05	
50	3	9	Ensar Hajder (BIH)	29.14	NR
51	8	2	Genaro Prono (PAR)	29.18	
52	8	9	Jordy Groters (ARU)	29.20	
53	8	8	Agnishwar Jayaprakash (IND)	29.31	
54	7	5	Chao Man Hou (MAC)	29.37	
54	8	3	Andrea Agius (MLT)	29.37	NR
56	8	7	Mbeh Tanji (CMR)	29.38	
57	9	0	Abdoul Khadre Mbaye Niane (SEN)	29.44	
58	8	0	Omiros Zagkas (CYP)	29.49	
59	7	4	Josue Dominguez Ramos (DOM)	29.72	
60	7	0	Damjan Petrovski (MKD)	29.74	NR
61	6	2	Eliebenezer San Jose Wong (NMI)	30.09	
62	7	2	Enrique Duran Garcia-Bedoya (PER)	30.10	
63	1	4	Adrian Todd (BOT)	30.24	
64	6	5	Damir Davletbaev (KGZ)	30.25	
65	7	1	Roy Barahona (HON)	30.38	
66	6	4	Darren Chan Chin Wah (MRI)	30.45	
67	6	8	Jordan Augier (LCA)	30.47	NR
68	5	7	Bradford Worrell (LCA)	30.49	
69	2	2	Md Shajahan Ali (BAN)	30.57	
70	6	6	Andrea M. Agius (MLT)	30.77	
71	6	1	Tory Michael Pragassa (KEN)	31.11	
72	6	3	John Paul Llanelo (GIB)	31.13	
73	4	3	Sio Kin Hei (MAC)	31.19	
73	6	7	Muhammad Isa Ahmad (BRU)	31.19	
75	2	1	Anthonny Sitraka Ralefy (MAD)	31.27	
76	6	0	Pierre Andre Adam (SEY)	31.31	
77	5	5	Ruslan Nazarov (TJK)	31.37	
78	4	5	Ponloeu Hemthon (CAM)	31.83	
79	5	6	Kensuke Kimura (NMI)	31.88	
80	5	4	C. Andrews (COK)	32.10	
80	6	9	Ameer Adnan Ali (IRQ)	32.10	
82	4	4	Kyle Dougan (VIN)	32.46	
83	4	2	Joshua Tibatemwa (UGA)	32.48	
84	5	0	Walid Daloul (QAT)	32.53	
85	5	2	Aziz Chaudhry Abdul (PAK)	32.65	
86	4	6	Hassan Ashraf (MDV)	32.95	
87	3	1	Mohamed Cheick Camara (GUI)	33.26	
88	5	1	Hilal Hemed Hilal (TAN)	33.71	
89	5	9	Abdulla Al-Yehari (QAT)	33.72	
90	4	7	Ganzi Semu Mugula (UGA)	33.98	
91	2	3	Adam David Kitururu (TAN)	34.08	
92	2	6	Kgosietsile Molefinyane (BOT)	34.13	
93	2	8	Ntseke Setho (LES)	34.53	
94	4	0	Brandon Schuster (SAM)	35.34	
95	4	1	Giordan Harris (MHL)	35.71	
96	3	4	Eloi Imaniraguha (RWA)	36.01	
97	4	8	Nikolas Sylvester (VIN)	36.33	
98	4	9	Jamal Tamasese (SAM)	36.48	
99	3	7	Moris Beale (SLE)	37.48	
100	2	7	Kamara Osman (SLE)	40.72	
101	5	3	Ben Moussa Abdulkadry Djinguy (CMR)	41.56	
	1	3	Roman Trussov (KAZ)	DSQ	
	1	5	Abdoul Bassith Traore (BUR)	DSQ	
	7	3	Neil Himanshu Contractor (IND)	DSQ	
	7	9	Andrew Rutherfurd (BOL)	DSQ	
	8	1	Shafee Mohamed (UAE)	DSQ	
	3	0	Miguel Ferreira (VEN)	DNS	
	3	3	Aonzoudine Chaoili (COM)	DNS	
	3	5	Athoumani Youssouf (COM)	DNS	
	5	8	Ezeldeen Edris (SUD)	DNS	
	7	8	João Aguiar (ANG)	DNS	

=== Semifinals ===
Rank	Heat	Lane	Name	Nationality	Time	Notes
1	1	2	Damir Dugonjič	Slovenia	26.27	Q
2	1	4	Florent Manaudou	France	26.49	Q
3	2	6	João Gomes Jr.	Brazil	26.50	Q
4	2	4	Aleksander Hetland	Norway	26.51	Q
5	2	7	Giulio Zorzi	South Africa	26.54	Q
6	1	3	Sergey Geybel	Russia	26.63	Q
7	2	3	Kevin Cordes	United States	26.70	Q
8	2	5	Felipe Lima	Brazil	26.71	Q
9	2	2	Mihail Alexandrov	United States	26.72	
10	1	5	Barry Murphy	Ireland	26.82	
11	1	6	Mattia Pesce	Italy	26.86	
12	2	1	Koichiro Okazaki	Japan	26.89	
13	1	7	Petr Bartůněk	Czech Republic	26.99	
14	2	8	Emil Tahirovič	Slovenia	27.24	
15	1	1	Li Xiayan	China	27.25	
16	1	8	Sasa Gerbec	Croatia	27.40	

=== Final ===
The final was held at 20:01.

Rank	Lane	Name	Nationality	Time	Notes
1st place, gold medalist(s)	6	Aleksander Hetland	Norway	26.30	
2nd place, silver medalist(s)	4	Damir Dugonjič	Slovenia	26.32	
3rd place, bronze medalist(s)	5	Florent Manaudou	France	26.33	
4	3	João Gomes Jr.	Brazil	26.50	
5	2	Giulio Zorzi	South Africa	26.64	
6	8	Felipe Lima	Brazil	26.68	
7	1	Kevin Cordes	United States	26.79	
8	7	Sergey Geybel	Russia	26.87	
