= 2012 FINA World Swimming Championships (25 m) – Men's 100 metre breaststroke =

Men's 100m Breaststroke at the 2012 Short Course Worlds
- Dates: 12 December (heats and semifinals); 13 December (final)
- Winning time: 57.10

Medalists
| gold medal | Fabio Scozzoli | Italy |
| silver medal | Damir Dugonjič | Slovenia |
| bronze medal | Kevin Cordes | United States |

The men's 100 metre breaststroke event at the 11th FINA World Swimming Championships (25m) took place 12 – 13 December 2012 at the Sinan Erdem Dome.

== Records ==
Prior to this competition, the existing world and championship records were as follows.

| | Name | Nation | Time | Location | Date |
|---|---|---|---|---|---|
| World record | Cameron van der Burgh | South Africa | 55.61 | Berlin | 15 November 2009 |
| Championship record | Cameron van der Burgh | South Africa | 56.80 | Dubai | 16 December 2010 |

No new records were set during this competition.

== Results ==
=== Heats ===
| Rank | Heat | Lane | Name | Time | Notes |
|---|---|---|---|---|---|
| 1 | 7 | 6 | Kevin Cordes (USA) | 57.66 | Q |
| 2 | 10 | 3 | Marco Koch (GER) | 58.10 | Q |
| 3 | 10 | 4 | Fabio Scozzoli (ITA) | 58.16 | Q |
| 4 | 9 | 5 | Mihail Alexandrov (USA) | 58.35 | Q |
| 5 | 9 | 3 | João Gomes Jr. (BRA) | 58.43 | Q |
| 5 | 9 | 2 | Koichiro Okazaki (JPN) | 58.43 | Q |
| 7 | 8 | 5 | Viatcheslav Sinkevich (RUS) | 58.49 | Q |
| 7 | 9 | 6 | Ihor Borysyk (UKR) | 58.49 | Q |
| 9 | 8 | 3 | Akihiro Yamaguchi (JPN) | 58.53 | Q |
| 10 | 9 | 4 | Damir Dugonjič (SLO) | 58.54 | Q |
| 11 | 10 | 6 | Felipe Lima (BRA) | 58.59 | Q |
| 12 | 10 | 2 | Michael Jamieson (GBR) | 58.61 | Q |
| 13 | 8 | 4 | Martti Aljand (EST) | 58.71 | Q |
| 14 | 10 | 7 | Mattia Pesce (ITA) | 58.86 | Q |
| 15 | 10 | 5 | Anton Lobanov (RUS) | 58.99 | Q |
| 16 | 8 | 7 | Simon Sjödin (SWE) | 59.03 | Q |
| 17 | 9 | 0 | Giulio Zorzi (RSA) | 59.09 | |
| 18 | 8 | 2 | Craig Benson (GBR) | 59.11 | |
| 18 | 10 | 1 | Li Xiayan (CHN) | 59.11 | |
| 20 | 8 | 1 | Valeriy Dymo (UKR) | 59.19 | |
| 21 | 8 | 6 | Eetu Karvonen (FIN) | 59.33 | |
| 22 | 7 | 3 | Abraham McLeod (TRI) | 59.35 | |
| 23 | 9 | 1 | Giedrius Titenis (LTU) | 59.40 | |
| 24 | 6 | 5 | Gal Nevo (ISR) | 59.46 | NR |
| 25 | 9 | 7 | Tomáš Klobučník (SVK) | 59.48 | |
| 26 | 10 | 8 | Petr Bartůněk (CZE) | 59.57 | |
| 27 | 9 | 8 | Laurent Carnol (LUX) | 59.60 | NR |
| 28 | 1 | 5 | Édgar Crespo (PAN) | 59.68 | |
| 29 | 5 | 2 | Barry Murphy (IRL) | 59.69 | |
| 30 | 8 | 9 | Jorge Murillo (COL) | 59.76 | |
| 31 | 7 | 2 | Chris Christensen (DEN) | 59.82 | |
| 32 | 6 | 1 | Anton Sveinn McKee (ISL) | 59.85 | |
| 33 | 7 | 4 | Vaidotas Blažys (LTU) | 1:00.26 | |
| 34 | 1 | 8 | Andrew Poznikoff (CAN) | 1:00.27 | |
| 35 | 6 | 8 | Choi Kyu-Woong (KOR) | 1:00.28 | |
| 36 | 8 | 8 | Filipp Provorkov (EST) | 1:00.29 | |
| 37 | 10 | 0 | Viktar Vabishchevich (BLR) | 1:00.38 | |
| 38 | 6 | 6 | Warren Barnes (CAN) | 1:00.43 | |
| 39 | 1 | 0 | Roman Trussov (KAZ) | 1:00.50 | |
| 40 | 1 | 2 | Huang Yunkun (CHN) | 1:00.64 | |
| 41 | 7 | 0 | Uldis Tazans (LAT) | 1:00.68 | NR |
| 42 | 7 | 5 | Christian Schurr Voight (MEX) | 1:00.79 | |
| 43 | 8 | 0 | Malick Fall (SEN) | 1:00.97 | |
| 44 | 6 | 4 | Eladio Carrión (PUR) | 1:01.04 | |
| 45 | 6 | 2 | Dmitrii Aleksandrov (KGZ) | 1:01.06 | |
| 46 | 7 | 8 | Martin Melconian (URU) | 1:01.15 | |
| 47 | 10 | 9 | Emil Tahirovič (SLO) | 1:01.17 | |
| 48 | 7 | 7 | Indra Gunawan (INA) | 1:01.22 | |
| 49 | 5 | 5 | Taki Mrabet (TUN) | 1:01.35 | |
| 50 | 9 | 9 | Mustafa Kacmaz (TUR) | 1:01.36 | |
| 51 | 7 | 9 | Ömer Arslanoğlu (TUR) | 1:01.49 | |
| 52 | 7 | 1 | Lionel Khoo (SIN) | 1:01.67 | |
| 53 | 1 | 4 | Dmitriy Balandin (KAZ) | 1:01.74 | |
| 54 | 6 | 3 | Nikolajs Maskalenko (LAT) | 1:01.80 | |
| 55 | 1 | 6 | Joshua Hall (PHI) | 1:02.55 | |
| 56 | 5 | 1 | Jordy Groters (ARU) | 1:02.98 | |
| 57 | 2 | 9 | Abdulrahman Albader (KUW) | 1:03.28 | |
| 58 | 6 | 7 | Genaro Prono (PAR) | 1:03.31 | |
| 59 | 6 | 0 | Chao Man Hou (MAC) | 1:03.33 | |
| 60 | 5 | 7 | Damir Davletbaev (KGZ) | 1:03.37 | |
| 61 | 5 | 6 | Agnishwar Jayaprakash (IND) | 1:03.55 | |
| 62 | 3 | 2 | Andrew Rutherfurd (BOL) | 1:03.74 | NR |
| 63 | 5 | 4 | Enrique Duran Garcia-Bedoya (PER) | 1:03.94 | |
| 64 | 4 | 2 | Lefkios Xanthou (CYP) | 1:04.11 | |
| 65 | 5 | 3 | Andrea Agius (MLT) | 1:04.27 | |
| 66 | 4 | 5 | Damjan Petrovski (MKD) | 1:04.37 | |
| 67 | 5 | 8 | Josue Dominguez Ramos (DOM) | 1:04.40 | NR |
| 68 | 4 | 9 | José Montoya (CRC) | 1:04.43 | |
| 69 | 6 | 9 | Mbeh Tanji (CMR) | 1:04.97 | |
| 70 | 4 | 0 | Eliebenezer San Jose Wong (NMI) | 1:05.03 | |
| 71 | 3 | 6 | Colin Bensadon (GIB) | 1:05.94 | |
| 72 | 4 | 6 | Darren Chan Chin Wah (MRI) | 1:06.06 | |
| 73 | 5 | 9 | Shafee Mohamed (UAE) | 1:06.47 | |
| 74 | 4 | 3 | Andrea M. Agius (MLT) | 1:07.27 | |
| 75 | 2 | 4 | Ruslan Nazarov (TJK) | 1:08.17 | |
| 76 | 5 | 0 | Abdoul Khadre Mbaye Niane (SEN) | 1:08.49 | |
| 77 | 4 | 7 | Neil Himanshu Contractor (IND) | 1:09.01 | |
| 78 | 2 | 5 | Kensuke Kimura (NMI) | 1:09.22 | |
| 79 | 3 | 3 | Tory Michael Pragassa (KEN) | 1:09.36 | |
| 80 | 2 | 3 | Julien Brice (LCA) | 1:10.16 | |
| 81 | 3 | 9 | Walid Daloul (QAT) | 1:10.24 | |
| 82 | 3 | 8 | Pierre Andre Adam (SEY) | 1:10.33 | |
| 83 | 4 | 8 | Johnny Rivera (GUM) | 1:10.37 | |
| 84 | 3 | 7 | John Paul Llanelo (GIB) | 1:10.60 | |
| 85 | 3 | 1 | C. Andrews (COK) | 1:10.85 | |
| 86 | 2 | 6 | Hassan Ashraf (MDV) | 1:12.81 | |
| 87 | 3 | 0 | Abdulla Al-Yehari (QAT) | 1:14.54 | |
| 88 | 4 | 4 | Aziz Chaudhry Abdul (PAK) | 1:14.61 | |
| 89 | 1 | 1 | Kgosietsile Molefinyane (BOT) | 1:15.01 | |
| 90 | 2 | 2 | Brandon Schuster (SAM) | 1:16.49 | |
| 91 | 1 | 9 | Mohamed Cheick Camara (GUI) | 1:17.00 | |
| 92 | 1 | 7 | Adam David Kitururu (TAN) | 1:17.56 | |
| 93 | 2 | 0 | Ablam Hodadje Awoussou (TAN) | 1:25.70 | |
| 94 | 2 | 1 | Nikolas Sylvester (VIN) | 1:28.98 | |
| 95 | 2 | 8 | Storm Halbich (VIN) | 1:30.24 | |
| | 2 | 7 | Jamal Tamasese (SAM) | DSQ | |
| | 3 | 4 | Muhammad Isa Ahmad (BRU) | DSQ | |
| | 3 | 5 | Ben Moussa Abdulkadry Djinguy (CMR) | DSQ | |
| | 1 | 3 | Miguel Ferreira (VEN) | DNS | |
| | 4 | 1 | João Aguiar (ANG) | DNS | |

=== Semifinals ===
| Rank | Heat | Lane | Name | Nationality | Time | Notes |
|---|---|---|---|---|---|---|
| 1 | 2 | 5 | Fabio Scozzoli | Italy | 57.66 | Q |
| 2 | 2 | 1 | Martti Aljand | Estonia | 57.82 | Q |
| 3 | 2 | 6 | Viatcheslav Sinkevich | Russia | 57.83 | Q |
| 4 | 2 | 4 | Kevin Cordes | United States | 57.92 | Q |
| 5 | 2 | 7 | Felipe Lima | Brazil | 58.05 | Q |
| 6 | 2 | 2 | Akihiro Yamaguchi | Japan | 58.15 | Q |
| 7 | 1 | 2 | Damir Dugonjič | Slovenia | 58.18 | Q |
| 8 | 1 | 5 | Mihail Alexandrov | United States | 58.35 | Q |
| 9 | 1 | 4 | Marco Koch | Germany | 58.43 | |
| 10 | 1 | 6 | Ihor Borysyk | Ukraine | 58.44 | |
| 11 | 2 | 3 | João Gomes Jr. | Brazil | 58.51 | |
| 12 | 1 | 7 | Michael Jamieson | United Kingdom | 58.56 | |
| 13 | 1 | 1 | Mattia Pesce | Italy | 58.69 | |
| 14 | 1 | 3 | Koichiro Okazaki | Japan | 58.78 | |
| 15 | 2 | 8 | Anton Lobanov | Russia | 59.13 | |
| | 1 | 8 | Simon Sjödin | Sweden | DSQ | |

=== Final ===
The final was held at 20:11.

| Rank | Lane | Name | Nationality | Time | Notes |
|---|---|---|---|---|---|
| 1st place, gold medalist(s) | 4 | Fabio Scozzoli | Italy | 57.10 | |
| 2nd place, silver medalist(s) | 1 | Damir Dugonjič | Slovenia | 57.32 | |
| 3rd place, bronze medalist(s) | 6 | Kevin Cordes | United States | 57.83 | |
| 4 | 5 | Martti Aljand | Estonia | 57.85 | |
| 5 | 8 | Mihail Alexandrov | United States | 57.86 | |
| 6 | 3 | Viatcheslav Sinkevich | Russia | 57.88 | |
| 7 | 7 | Akihiro Yamaguchi | Japan | 58.26 | |
| 8 | 2 | Felipe Lima | Brazil | 58.73 | |
