= Ganiel =

Ganiel is a given name and a surname. Notable people with the name include:

- Ganiel Krishnan (born 1994), Indian-Filipino beauty queen, actress, and sportscaster
- Amir Ganiel (1963–2018), Israeli swimmer
- Imri Ganiel (born 1992), Israeli swimmer, son of Amir
