= Kirill Strelnikov =

Russian swimmer (born 1992)

Personal information
- National team: Russia
- Born: 29 May 1992 (age 34) Volgograd, Russia
- Height: 2.0 m (6 ft 7 in)

Sport
- Sport: Swimming
- Strokes: Breaststroke
Medal record
Men's swimming
Event	1st	2nd	3rd
World Championships (SC)	1	0	0
European Championships (SC)	0	0	1
Swimming World Cup	0	0	2
World University Games	1	0	0
Total	2	0	3
Representing Russian Swimming Federation
World Championships (SC)
Gold medal – first place	2021 Abu Dhabi	4×50 m medley
Representing Russia
European Championships (SC)
Bronze medal – third place	2021 Kazan	4×50 m mixed medley
Swimming World Cup
Bronze medal – third place	2013 Moscow	50 m breaststroke
Bronze medal – third place	2021 Kazan	50 m breaststroke
World University Games
Gold medal – first place	2013 Kazan	4×100 m medley

Kirill Strelnikov (born 29 May 1992) is a Russian competitive swimmer. He won a gold medal in the 4×50 metre medley relay at the 2021 World Short Course Championships and the 4×100 metre medley relay at the 2013 World University Games, swimming the breaststroke leg of both relays in the final. At the 2021 European Short Course Championships he won a bronze medal in the 4×50 metre mixed medley relay, swimming the breaststroke leg of the relay in the preliminaries.

== Background ==
Strelnikov was born on 29 May 1992 in Volgograd, Russia and started competitive swimming in 1999. To complement his in-the-pool regimen, he has worked at the Laboratory of Sports Adaptology, in Moscow, as a specialist.

== Career ==
=== 2012–2013: International debut ===
==== 2012 European Aquatics Championships ====
At the 2012 European Aquatics Championships in Debrecen, Hungary in May, Strelnikov placed fifth in the final of the 100 metre breaststroke with a time of 1:01.12, finishing 0.19 seconds behind the bronze medalist in the event Mattia Pesce of Italy. In the semifinals of the 50 metre breaststroke three days later, he placed 14th with a time of 28.25 seconds. Two days later, he split a 1:00.17 in the final of the 4×100 metre medley relay to place fifth with finals relay teammates Vitaly Borisov (backstroke), Nikita Konovalov (butterfly), and Vitaly Syrnikov (freestyle).

==== 2013 World University Games ====
2013 World University Games
Gold medal – first place	4×100 m medley	3:34.27

On the second day of the 2013 World University Games, held at the Palace of Water Sports in Kazan in mid-July, Strelnikov placed fourth in the final of the 100 metre breaststroke, finishing with a time of 1:00.48 that was 0.12 seconds slower than the bronze medalist Edoardo Giorgetti of Italy. Five days later, he won a gold medal as part of the 4×100 metre medley relay, swimming a 1:00.06 for the breaststroke leg of the relay to contribute to the winning time of 3:34.27 with finals relay teammates Vladimir Morozov (backstroke), Evgenii Koptelov (butterfly), and Andrey Grechin (freestyle).

==== 2013 World Aquatics Championships ====
For his first event of the 2013 World Aquatics Championships in Barcelona, Spain in late July, Strelnikov swam a personal best time of 59.80 seconds in the preliminary heats of the 100 metre breaststroke, advancing to the semifinals ranking second behind Christian Sprenger of Australia. In the semifinals later in the day, he ranked ninth with a time of 59.94 seconds, which was just 0.02 seconds behind the slowest qualifier for the final and eighth-ranked swimmer, Kosuke Kitajima of Japan. Two days later, he qualified for the semifinals of the 50 metre breaststroke ranking fifth with a 27.36 in the prelims heats. He posted a time of 27.75 seconds in the semifinals, ranking 13th and not advancing to the final of the event. On the final day of competition five days later, Strelnikov split a 59.84 for the breaststroke leg of the 4×100 metre medley relay in the prelims heats, helping qualify the relay to the final tied in rank for second with prelims relay teammates Vladimir Morozov (backstroke), Nikolay Skvortsov (butterfly), and Nikita Lobintsev (freestyle). For the final, Yevgeny Korotyshkin substituted in for Nikolay Skvortsov, Andrey Grechin substituted in for Nikita Lobintsev, Strelnikov split a 59.24 for the 100 metre breaststroke portion, and the relay placed fourth in a time of 3:32.74.

==== 2013 Swimming World Cup ====
2013 Swimming World Cup
Bronze medal – third place	50 m breaststroke	27.20

At the 2013 Swimming World Cup stop in Moscow, and conducted in short course metres, Strelnikov swam a 27.62 in the prelims heats of the 50 metre breaststroke, qualifying for the final ranking eighth. In the evening final, he won the bronze medal with a time of 27.20 seconds, finishing 1.37 seconds behind gold medalist in the event Roland Schoeman of South Africa. The following day, he placed 20th in the prelims heats of the 100 metre breaststroke with a 1:01.35 and did not advance to the final.

=== 2021: Return after 8 year hiatus from international championships ===
In the 50 metre breaststroke at the 2021 Russia National Championships in April, also serving as the Russian Olympic Trials for the 2020 Summer Olympics, Strelnikov won the gold medal with a personal best time of 26.78 seconds, however he did not qualify to compete at the Olympic Games as the event was not offered as part of the Olympic program for the year. The time of 26.78 seconds ranked him as the fourth-fastest performer in the event for the entire 2021 year, 0.57 seconds behind first-ranked Adam Peaty of Great Britain, 0.39 seconds behind second-ranked Nicolò Martinenghi of Italy, 0.32 behind third-ranked Ilya Shymanovich of Belarus, and 0.02 seconds ahead of fifth-ranked Arno Kamminga of the Netherlands.

==== 2021 International Swimming League ====
For the 2021 International Swimming League regular season, conducted in short course metres in August and September, Strelnikov was a part of the roster for Team Iron. In the seventh match of the regular season, he took second-place in the 50 metre breaststroke with a time of 26.31 seconds, finishing 0.17 seconds behind first-place finisher Nic Fink of the Cali Condors. On the second day of the match, he placed fifth in the 100 metre breaststroke with a 58.40. In the eleventh match, he tied Alessandro Pinzuti of Tokyo Frog Kings with a 26.20 in the 50 metre breaststroke for second-place, both finished 0.19 seconds behind Yasuhiro Koseki of the Tokyo Frog Kings.

==== 2021 Swimming World Cup ====
2021 Swimming World Cup
Bronze medal – third place	50 m breaststroke	26.12

At the Kazan stop of the 2021 Swimming World Cup in October, Strelnikov started competition on day one with a ninth-place finish in the 100 metre breaststroke, swimming a 58.43 in the preliminary heats. For his second and final event he competed in the 50 metre breaststroke, ranking fifth in the prelims heats with a 26.37 and qualifying for the final later in the day. In the final he won the bronze medal with a time of 26.12 seconds, finishing within three-tenths of a second of gold medalist Fabian Schwingenschlögl of Germany and silver medalist Arno Kamminga of the Netherlands.

==== 2021 European Short Course Championships ====
2021 European Championships
Bronze medal – third place	4×50 m mixed medley	1:36.42 (h)

On the second day of the 2021 European Short Course Championships in Kazan in November, Strelnikov swam a time of 57.68 seconds, ranked eleventh overall, third amongst the Russian swimmers in the event, and did not qualify for the final as he was not one of the two fastest swimmers representing Russia. For his other individual event, the 50 metre breaststroke, he placed fifth in the final on the sixth and final day of competition with a personal best time of 26.03 seconds. Also on the final day of competition, he split a 25.83 for the breaststroke leg of the 4×50 metre mixed medley relay in the prelims heats, helping qualify the relay to the final ranking first. On the finals relay, Oleg Kostin substituted in for him and the relay finished third in 1:36.42 with all relay members, prelims and finals, meaning a bronze medal for their efforts.

==== 2021 World Short Course Championships ====
2021 World Championships
Gold medal – first place	4×50 m medley	1:30.51 (CR)

In December 2021, at the 2021 World Short Course Championships held at Etihad Arena in Abu Dhabi, United Arab Emirates, Strelnikov swam the breaststroke leg of the 4×50 metre mixed medley relay in the final, splitting a 26.02 to help achieve a fourth-place finish in 1:37.44. For his other relay, the 4×50 metre medley relay two days later, he split a 25.62 for the breaststroke leg of the relay to help win the gold medal in a new time Championships record time of 1:30.51 with finals relay teammates Kliment Kolesnikov (backstroke), Andrey Minakov (butterfly), and Vladimir Morozov (freestyle). Concluding racing at the Championships with the 50 metre breaststroke, he placed tenth in the semifinals with a time of 26.33 seconds.

As part of a reactionary ban enacted by the Court of Arbitration for Sport following accusations of widespread doping in Russia and spanning 17 December 2020 to 16 December 2022, the Russian team, including Strelnikov, competed using the name Russian Swimming Federation at the World Championships.

=== 2022: Banned twice for being Russian ===
On 3 March 2022, European aquatic sport governing body, LEN, shot down the continued return of Strelnikov at their competitions, banning him and all other Russians and Belarusians from their competitions indefinitely. Over one month later, on 21 April 2022, the world aquatic sport governing body, FINA, also shut down his opportunity to grow his racing experience at their competitions, banning him and all other Russians and Belarusians through at least the end of the year. His times achieved in the 2022 year following the implementation of the FINA ban did not count for world records nor world rankings. At the 2022 Russian Solidarity Games, with the short course swimming competition contested in Kazan in November, he won the bronze medal with a time of 26.03 seconds, finishing within one-tenth of a second of gold medalist Ilya Shymanovich.

=== 2023 ===
Eleven days before the start of the 2023 Russian National Swimming Championships, on 5 April, World Aquatics (formerly FINA) announced the continuation of its 2022 ban on Russians and Belarusians from its competitions. In the semifinals of the 100 metre breaststroke on the first day of the 2023 Russian National Championships in April in Kazan, Strelnikov received a b-classification with a time of 1:01.03 and overall ranking of tenth. He ranked fourth in the morning preliminaries of the 50 metre breaststroke on the fifth day with a 27.19 and qualified for the evening semifinals. He reiterated a fourth-rank performance in the semifinals with a time of 27.16 seconds, qualifying for the final the following day. The following, and final, day, he placed sixth in the final with a time of 27.24 seconds.

== International championships ==
Meet	50 breaststroke	100 breaststroke	4×50 medley relay	4×100 medley relay	4×50 mixed medley relay
EC 2012	5th	14th	—N/a	5th	—N/a
WUG 2013	—N/a	4th	—N/a	1st place, gold medalist(s)	—N/a
WC 2013	13th	9th	—N/a	4th	—N/a
ESC 2021	5th	11th (h)		—N/a	(bronze) ^{[a]}
SCW 2021	10th		1st place, gold medalist(s)		4th

^{a} Strelnikov swam only in the prelims heats.

== Personal best times ==
=== Long course metres (50 m pool) ===
Event	Time		Meet	Location	Date	Ref
50 m breaststroke	26.78		2021 Russian National Championships	Kazan	5 April 2021	
100 m breaststroke	59.80	h	2013 World Aquatics Championships	Barcelona, Spain	28 July 2013	

Legend: h – heat

=== Short course metres (25 m pool) ===
Event	Time	Meet	Location	Date	Ref
50 m breaststroke	25.90	2021 Russian Short Course Championships	Saint Petersburg	21 November 2021	
100 m breaststroke	57.13	2020 Vladimir Salnikov Cup	Saint Petersburg	22 December 2020	

== Honours and awards ==
- Master of Sport of International Class, recipient from Russian Federation: 2012
- Certificate of Honour, received from Russian Federation president: 2013

== See also ==
- List of World Swimming Championships (25 m) medalists (men)
