= Helene Spilling Ødegaard =

Norwegian dancer (born 1996)

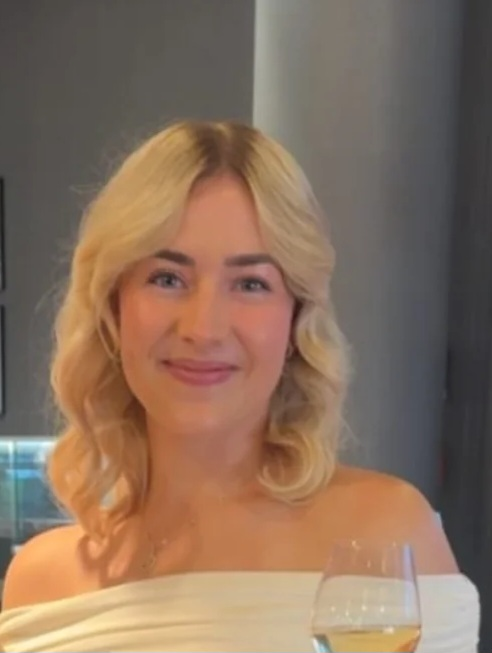
- Spilling in September 2025
- Born: Helene Spilling; 17 April 1996 (age 30); Gjerdrum, Norway
- Occupations: Dancer; television personality; businesswoman
- Years active: 2011–present
- Height: 1.71 m (5 ft 7 in)
- Spouse: Martin Ødegaard (m. 2024)
- Children: 1

Helene Spilling Ødegaard (née Spilling, born 17 April 1996) is a Norwegian professional dancer. She is best known for her appearances on Skal vi danse, the Norwegian edition of Dancing with the Stars, and was the winner of the 17th season in 2021. During her competitive dancing career, she won the Norwegian dance championship 17 times, and represented Norway in European and world tournaments.

== Early life ==
Helene Spilling was born on 17 April 1996 in Gjerdrum. Her interest in dance was sparked by watching Skal vi danse at a young age. Spilling began to dance at the age of 12.

== Competitive dance career ==
In 2011, Spilling danced competitively for the first time with Christian Skibsrud. They won the NM in Latin and 10-dance. The following year, they competed in the U19 category and won a gold medal in ballroom dancing.

Between 2013 and 2017, she won twelve NM titles in the U19, U21 and adult classes with Jonas Pettersen. She and Pettersen were the winners of the Kongepokal in 2017.

In 2017, Spilling moved to Lithuania alone to venture further with a Lithuanian dance partner, Dominykas Granskas. Representing Norway, they competed in both European and world tournaments for the Lillestrøm-based dance school LSKdans, and in 2018 became the Northern European Champions in standard dance. They also made it to the quarter-finals in Grand Slam competitions. Spilling and Granskas were honoured at the 2019 "Dance Awards" in Norway, receiving the "Duo of the Year" prize. In total, Spilling secured 17 gold medals, four silver medals and two bronze medals from the NM throughout her time competing. After two and a half years in Lithuania, she returned to Norway and chose to end her competitive dancing career.

== Skal vi danse ==
In her debut season on Skal vi danse in 2020, Spilling partnered television personality and presenter Nate Kahungu. They finished as runners-up to Andreas Wahl and Mai Mentzoni.

In her second season the following year, she was paired with journalist Simon Nitsche. They won the 17th season of Skal vi danse, triumphing against Magnus Moan and Ewa Trela.

In the 2022 Skal vi danse: All Stars season, Spilling was partnered with former swimmer Aleksander Hetland. They finished in 3rd place after a dance-off against Jørgine Massa Vasstrand and Santino Mirenna in the semi-final.

In the 2023 season of Skal vi danse, Spilling was paired with stylist Harlem Alexander. They ended in 4th place after a dance-off against Alexandra Joner and Ole Thomas Hansen in the quarter-final.

During the 2026 season of Skal vi danse, she returned for one episode, performing two dances with fellow professional dancer Santino Mirenna.

Summary
Year	Season	Partner	Place	Average score	Total points
2020	16	Nate Kahungu	2nd	35.81	573
2021	17	Simon Nitsche	1st	28.31	453
2022	18	Aleksander Hetland	3rd	26.17	314
2023	19	Harlem Alexander	4th	25.70	257

=== Season 16 (2020): with Nate Kahungu ===
Week no.	Dance	Song	Judges' scores	Total	Result	Ref.
1	Salsa	"Gettin' Jiggy wit It"	7 + 7 + 7 + 6	27	No elimination	
2	Foxtrot	"When You're Smiling"	8 + 8 + 8 + 9	**33**	Safe	
3	Cha-Cha-Cha	"Men in Black"	6 + 7 + 6 + 7	26	Safe	
4	Showdance	"Axel F"	9 + 9 + 10 + 10	**38**	Safe	
5	Rumba	"Demons"	9 + 8 + 9 + 9	35	Safe	
6	Viennese waltz	"Neverland"	7 + 7 + 7 + 7	28	Eliminated	
7	Showdance	"Ghettoparasitt"	10 + 10 + 10 + 10	**40**	Safe (return)	
8	Samba	"Bun Up the Dance"	9 + 9 + 9 + 9	**36**	Safe	
9	Paso Doble	"Heads Will Roll"	9 + 9 + 10 + 9	37	Safe	
10	Quickstep	"Halo / Walking on Sunshine"	8 + 8 + 9 + 9	34	Safe	
10	Argentine tango	"Human"	10 + 10 + 10 + 10	**40**	Safe	
11	Jive	"Take on Me"	10 + 10 + 10 + 10	**40**	Safe	
11	Tango	"There's Nothing Holdin' Me Back"	9 + 10 + 10 + 10	**39**	Safe	
12	Argentine tango	"Human"	10 + 10 + 10 + 10	**40**	Safe	
12	Foxtrot	"La Vie en rose"	10 + 10 + 10 + 10	**40**	Safe	
12	Showdance	"Dance Monkey"	10 + 10 + 10 + 10	**40**	**2nd place**	

• Points that are highlighted in bold indicate that Nate & Helene were at the top of the leaderboard.

• Judges: Trine Dehli Cleve, Egor Filipenko, Merete Lingjærde, and Tore Petterson.

=== Season 17 (2021): with Simon Nitsche ===
Week no.	Dance	Song	Judges' scores	Total	Result	Ref.
1	**Cha-Cha-Cha**	"Dynamite"	8 + 8 + 8	24	No elimination	
2	**Foxtrot**	"En Solskinnsdag"	9 + 9 + 9	**27**	Safe	
3	**Rumba**	"More Than Words"	8 + 9 + 8	25	Safe	
4	**Showdance**	"Run Away"	9 + 10 + 9	28	Safe	
5	**Jive**	"Rebel Yell"	9 + 9 + 10	28	Safe	
6	**Modern**	"Writing's On the Wall"	9 + 10 + 10	**29**	Safe	
7	**Viennese waltz**	"Ein farfar i livet"	10 + 10 + 10	**30**	Safe	
8	**Quickstep**	"I Want Candy"	9 + 8 + 8	25	Safe	
9	**Paso Doble** w/ Aleksander Hetland	"Eye of the Tiger"	10 + 10 + 10	**30**	Safe	
10	**Tango**	"Bad Habits"	9 + 9 + 10	**28**	Safe	
10	**Samba**	"El Diablo"	10 + 10 + 10	**30**	D.O - safe	
11	**Salsa**	"Hung Up"	10 + 10 + 10	**30**	Safe	
11	**Argentine tango**	"Running"	10 + 10 + 9	29	Safe	
12	**Cha-Cha-Cha**	"Dynamite"	10 + 10 + 10	**30**	Safe	
12	**Foxtrot**	"Someone You Loved"	10 + 10 + 10	**30**	Safe	
12	**Showdance**	"Blinding Lights"	10 + 10 + 10	**30**	**Winners**	

• Points that are highlighted in bold indicate that Simon & Helene were at the top of the leaderboard.

• From 2021 to 2023, there were three judges - Trine Dehli Cleve, Morten Hegseth, and Merete Lingjærde - resulting in a maximum score of 30 points per dance rather than 40.

=== Season 18 (2022): with Aleksander Hetland ===
Week no.	Dance	Song	Judges' scores	Total	Result	Ref.
1	**Tango**	"Pepas"	6 + 6 + 7	19	Safe	
2	**Salsa**	"Don't Go Yet"	9 + 9 + 9	**27**	Safe	
3	**Jive**	"Fire"	9 + 9 + 9	27	Safe	
4	**Modern**	"Arcade"	9 + 9 + 10	28	Safe	
5	**Foxtrot**	"Dancing On My Own"	9 + 9 + 9	27	Safe	
6	**Argentine tango**	"Mother"	10 + 10 + 10	**30**	Safe	
7	**Showdance**	"Rock Your Body"	7 + 7 + 8	22	Safe	
8	**Paso Doble**	"Warriors"	10 + 9 + 10	29	Safe	
9	**Samba** w/ Grunde Myhrer	"Don't Call Me Up"	9 + 9 + 8	26	Doubt	
10	**Rumba**	"Toxic"	9 + 9 + 9	27	Safe	
11	**Argentine tango**	"River"	9 + 9 + 8	26	Safe	
11	**Modern**	"Without You"	10 + 8 + 8	26	**Eliminated**	

• Points that are highlighted in bold indicate that Aleksander & Helene were at the top of the leaderboard.

=== Season 19 (2023): with Harlem Alexander ===
Week no.	Dance	Song	Judges' scores	Total	Result	Ref.
1	Tango	"I'm Good"	7 + 8 + 8	23	No elimination	
2	Cha-Cha-Cha	"One Kiss"	7 + 7 + 7	21	Safe	
3	Modern	"Ikke som de andre"	8 + 8 + 8	24	Safe	
4	Paso Doble	"Mission Accomplished"	9 + 9 + 9	27	Safe	
5	Bhangra	"Mundian To Bach Ke"	9 + 9 + 9	27	Safe	
6	Rumba	"Når Snøen Smelter"	10 + 10 + 10	**30**	Safe	
7	Quickstep	"Because We Can"	7 + 9 + 9	25	Safe	
8	Samba	"Hip Hip Chin Chin"	10 + 10 + 9	29	Safe	
9	Foxtrot	"You're Welcome"	8 + 8 + 8	24	Doubt	
10	Viennese waltz	"7 Rings"	10 + 8 + 9	27	**Eliminated**	

• Points that are highlighted in bold indicate that Harlem & Helene were at the top of the leaderboard.

== Other television appearances ==
In 2021, Spilling was a contestant on the third season of Alle mot alle. Alongside Birgit Skarstein, she finished eighth in the group stage.

Spilling took part in the 14th season of NRK's television series Mesternes mester. Spilling is the fifth dancer to have taken part in the program and was the most successful dancer at the time, finishing in fifth place.

The first season of 24-stjerners julekalender premiered in December 2022, with Spilling among the contestants. She was eliminated in the 15th episode.

Spilling was a contestant on Mesternes mester team in 2026, a spin-off of the original show. She ended in 4th place with Stig-André Berge.

== Business ventures ==
Spilling is the founder and owner of The Zone Dance Studio in Oslo. The Zone has since served as the training location for Skal vi danse contestants from the 2022 season onwards.

=== Other ===
She is a brand ambassador for Thune, a leading jewellery brand in Norway. It was first announced in May 2024. In June 2026, Spilling started to share her crocheting hobby and uploaded instructions on how to make various patterns to her own website, requesting for donations to be made to the Norwegian Children's Cancer Association.

== Personal life ==
Spilling is married to football player Martin Ødegaard; they have a son, born on 1 December 2024.

She is close friends with former Paralympic athlete Birgit Skarstein. They lived together in Oslo for four years before Spilling moved to London.

Spilling has one older sister. She is the granddaughter of the late Internet pioneer Pål Spilling.

== Filmography ==
=== Television ===
Year	Title	Role	Notes
2014	Melodi Grand Prix 2014	Background dancer	For Linnea Dale - "High Hopes"
2020–	Skal vi danse	Professional dancer	2nd (2020); 1st (2021); 3rd (2022); 4th (2023)
2020–2022	Dansebobla	Herself	Season 2 (2020); season 3 (2021); season 4 (2022)
2021	Alle mot alle	Contestant	Season 3; 8th place in the group stage
2021	Norges nye megahit	Performance dancer	For Einar Nilsson - season 1; episode 2 - "22"
2022	Truls à la Hellstrøms Bistro	Herself	Season 1; guest in episode 8
2022	24-stjerners julekalender	Contestant	Season 1; 10th place, eliminated on day 15 of 24
2023	Mesternes mester	Contestant	Season 14; 5th place, eliminated in episode 7
2023	Melodi Grand Prix 2023	Background dancer	For Elsie Bay - "Love You in a Dream"
2023	Harm & Hegseth	Herself	Season 3; guest in episode 2
2024	Drømmen om EM	Herself	Docuseries; appearance in episode 3
2026	Enkel Servering i VM	Herself	Season 1; guest in episode 19
2026	Mesternes mester team	Contestant	Season 1; 4th place, eliminated in episode 7
