= Dániel Gyurta =

Hungarian swimmer (born 1989)

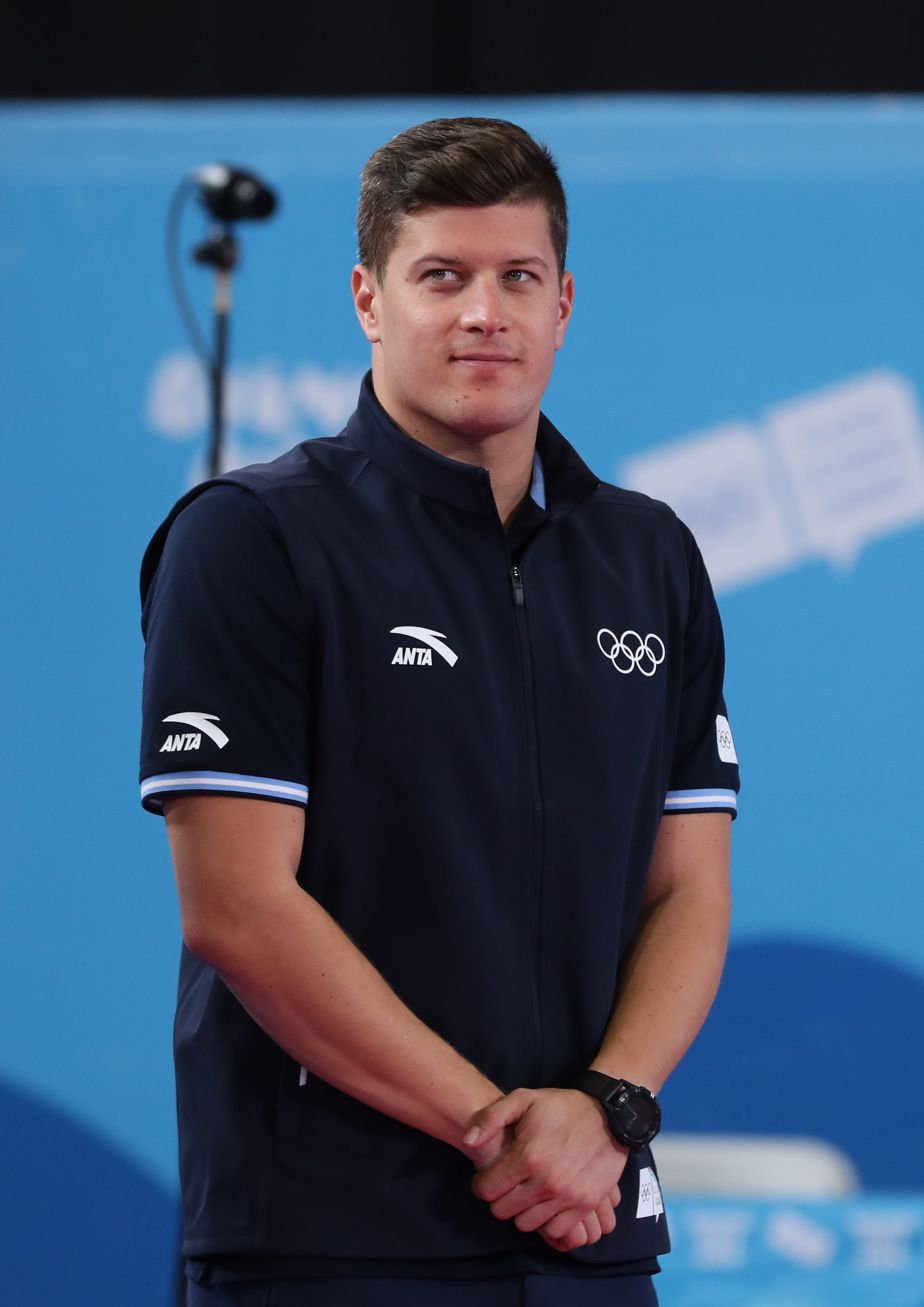

Personal information
- Full name: Dániel Gyurta
- Nickname: "Dani"
- National team: Hungary
- Born: 4 May 1989 (age 37) Budapest, Hungary
- Height: 1.85 m (6 ft 1 in)
- Weight: 77 kg (170 lb)

Sport
- Sport: Swimming
- Strokes: Breaststroke
- Club: Újpesti TE
Medal record
Men's swimming
Representing Hungary
Event	1st	2nd	3rd
Olympic Games	1	1	0
World Championships (LC)	3	0	1
World Championships (SC)	2	1	0
European Championships (LC)	2	0	2
European Championships (SC)	6	2	0
Total	14	4	3
Olympic Games
Gold medal – first place	2012 London	200 m breaststroke
Silver medal – second place	2004 Athens	200 m breaststroke
World Championships (LC)
Gold medal – first place	2009 Rome	200 m breaststroke
Gold medal – first place	2011 Shanghai	200 m breaststroke
Gold medal – first place	2013 Barcelona	200 m breaststroke
Bronze medal – third place	2015 Kazan	200 m breaststroke
World Championships (SC)
Gold medal – first place	2012 Istanbul	200 m breaststroke
Gold medal – first place	2014 Doha	200 m breaststroke
Silver medal – second place	2010 Dubai	200 m breaststroke
European Championships (LC)
Gold medal – first place	2010 Budapest	200 m breaststroke
Gold medal – first place	2012 Debrecen	200 m breaststroke
Bronze medal – third place	2012 Debrecen	4×100 m medley
Bronze medal – third place	2014 Berlin	4×100 m medley
European Championships (SC)
Gold medal – first place	2006 Helsinki	200 m breaststroke
Gold medal – first place	2007 Debrecen	200 m breaststroke
Gold medal – first place	2009 Istanbul	200 m breaststroke
Gold medal – first place	2011 Szczecin	200 m breaststroke
Gold medal – first place	2013 Herning	100 m breaststroke
Gold medal – first place	2013 Herning	200 m breaststroke
Silver medal – second place	2009 Istanbul	100 m breaststroke
Silver medal – second place	2015 Netanya	200 m breaststroke

Dániel Gyurta (Hungarian pronunciation: [ˈdaːniɛl ˈɟurtɒ]; born 4 May 1989) is a Hungarian former competitive swimmer who mainly competed in the 200-metre breaststroke. In 2016, Gyurta became a member of the International Olympic Committee (IOC).

== Career ==
In August 2004, Gyurta competed at the Olympics in Athens. He won the silver medal in the 200 m breaststroke in a time of 2:10.80, at the age of 15.

In March 2007, Gyurta competed at the World Championships in Melbourne. In the 200 m breaststroke, he finished sixth in a time of 2:11.62.

In August 2008, Gyurta competed at the Olympics in Beijing. Competing in the 200 m breaststroke, he went 2:08.68 in the heats, breaking the European and Olympic records of 2:08.98 set by Italy's Paolo Bossini earlier in the round. In the final, Gyurta finished fifth in a time of 2:09.22; gold medalist Kosuke Kitajima finished as Olympic record holder.

In July 2009, Gyurta competed at the World Championships in Rome. In the 200 m breaststroke final, he was in sixth place at the 150 m mark, but he managed to take the lead on the final lap to win the gold medal in a time of 2:07.64, 0.01 ahead of the US' Eric Shanteau.

In December 2009, Gyurta competed at the European Championships in Istanbul. He won the silver medal in the 100 m breaststroke in a time of 56.72. He then competed in the 200 m breaststroke, winning the gold medal in a time of 2:00.67, which broke the world record of 2:01.98 set by Australia's Christian Sprenger in August 2009.

In August 2010, Gyurta competed at the 2010 European Championships in Budapest. He won the gold medal in the 200 m breaststroke in a time of 2:08.95, which broke the championship record of 2:09.64 set by Russia's Grigory Falko in 2008.

In December 2010, Gyurta competed at the World Championships (25 m) in Dubai. In the 200 m breaststroke, he went 2:04.46 in the heats, breaking the championship record of 2:04.98 set by the US' Brendan Hansen in 2004. In the final, Gyurta won the silver medal in a time of 2:03.47; his championship record was broken by gold medalist, Naoya Tomita of Japan.

In July 2011, Gyurta competed at the World Championships in Shanghai. He won the gold medal in the 200 m breaststroke in a time of 2:08.41, becoming the second male swimmer to win consecutive world titles in the event.

In May 2012, Gyurta competed at the European Championships in Debrecen. He won the gold medal in the 200 m breaststroke in a championship record time of 2:08.60.

In July–August 2012, Gyurta competed at the Olympics in London. He finished fourth in the 100 m breaststroke in a Hungarian record time of 59.53. In the 200 m breaststroke, he won the gold medal in a time of 2:07.28, breaking the world record of 2:07.31 set by Sprenger in 2009. Gyurta's world record stood until September 2012. After the race, he offered a replica of his Olympic medal to the parents of his former competitor Alexander Dale Oen, who had died in April 2012; Gyurta's gesture was appreciated by Dale Oen's family. Gyurta was consequently given the International Fair Play Award by UNESCO.

In December 2012, Gyurta competed at the World Championships (25 m) in Istanbul. In the 200 m breaststroke, he won the gold medal in a time of 2:01.35, which broke the championship record of 2:03.12 set by Tomita in 2010.

In August 2013, Gyurta competed at the World Championships in Barcelona. He won his third consecutive world title in the 200 m breaststroke, in a time of 2:07.23, which set a new European record, and broke Sprenger's championship record of 2:07.31 from 2009.

In December 2013, Gyurta competed at the European Short Course Championships in Herning. He won the gold medal in the 100 m breaststroke in a time of 57.08. He then competed in the 200 m breaststroke, winning the gold medal in a time of 2:00.72.

In August 2014, Gyurta competed in the European Championships in Berlin. Citing a disrupted preparation, Gyurta withdrew from the 200 m breaststroke, with the intention of returning to the event at the World Championships (25m) in December 2014. He still competed in the 100 m breaststroke, finishing fourth in a time of 59.88.

Two weeks after the European Championships, Gyurta competed at the Dubai leg of the FINA World Cup. He went 2:00.48 in the short course 200 m breaststroke, breaking his own world record.

In December 2014, Gyurta competed at the World Championships (25 m) in Doha. He withdrew from the 100 m breaststroke. In the 200 m breaststroke, he won the gold medal in a time of 2:01.49.

In August 2015, Gyurta competed at the World Championships in Kazan. In the 200 m breaststroke, he finished third in a time of 2:08.10, thereby winning his fourth consecutive World Championship medal in the event.

In August 2016, Gyurta competed at the Olympics in Rio de Janeiro. In the 200 m breaststroke, he finished seventeenth in a time of 2:11.28.

In 2016, Gyurta was elected to the IOC Athletes' Commission.

In July 2017, Gyurta competed at the World Championships in Budapest. In the 200 m breaststroke, he finished seventeenth in a time of 2:11.28.

In March 2018, Gyurta retired from swimming at the age of 28.

== Personal life ==
Gyurta was born in Budapest. His brother Gergely is also a former swimmer.

Gyurta has a daughter, born in June 2024.

== Awards ==
- Order of Merit of the Republic of Hungary – Knight's Cross: 2004
- Hungarian swimmer of the Year: 2004, 2009, 2011, 2012, 2013
- Hungarian Junior Athlete of the Year – National Sports Association (NSSZ) Awards: 2004, 2007
- Junior Príma award: 2008
- Hungarian Sportsman of the Year: 2009, 2012, 2013
- Order of Merit of the Republic of Hungary – Officer's Cross: 2010
- Best Youth Hungarian Athlete of the year – NSSZ Awards: 2011
- Best Hungarian Junior Sportman of the Year (Héraklész): 2011
- Order of Merit of Hungary – Commander's Cross: 2012
- UNESCO Fair Play Award: 2013
- Swimming World Magazine – European Swimmer of the Year: 2013
- Hungarian university athlete of the year: 2015
- Honorary Citizen of Újpest: 2016
- International Swimming Hall of Fame inductee: 2024

Records
Preceded by Christian Sprenger	World record holder Men's 200 m breaststroke 1 August 2012 – 15 September 2012	Succeeded by Akihiro Yamaguchi
Preceded by Christian Sprenger	World record holder Men's 200 m breaststroke (25 m); 13 December 2009 – 20 November 2016	Succeeded by Marco Koch
Awards
Preceded by Attila Vajda; Krisztián Berki	Hungarian Sportsman of The Year; 2009; 2012, 2013	Succeeded by Krisztián Berki; Krisztián Berki
Preceded by Yannick Agnel	European Swimmer of the Year; 2013	Succeeded by Adam Peaty
