= Fabio Scozzoli =

Italian swimmer (born 1988)

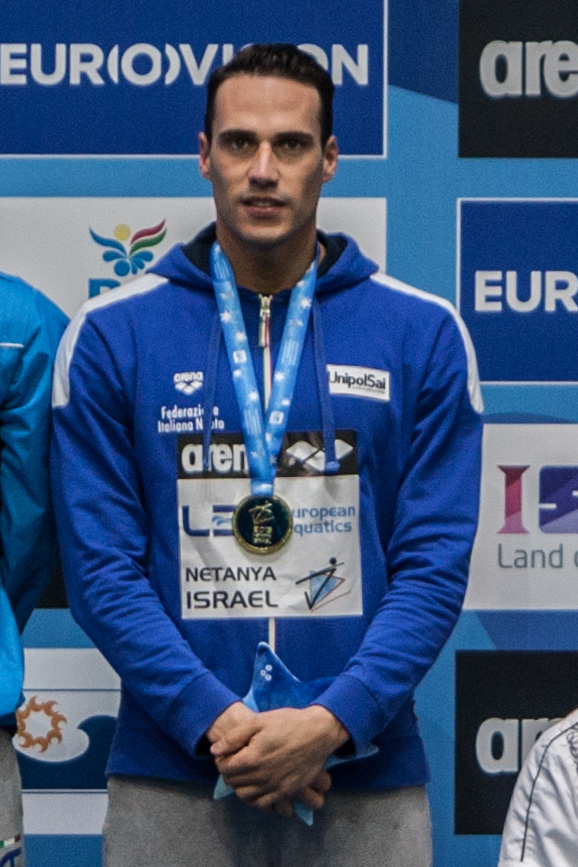
- Netanya 2015

Personal information
- Nationality: Italian
- Born: 3 August 1988 (age 38) Lugo, Italy
- Height: 1.88 m (6 ft 2 in)
- Weight: 88 kg (194 lb)

Sport
- Sport: Swimming
- Strokes: Breaststroke
- Club: Imolanuoto Team Romagna; C.S. Esercito
Medal record
Event	1st	2nd	3rd
World Championships (LC)	0	2	0
World Championships (SC)	1	1	2
European Championships (LC)	3	2	3
European Championships (SC)	8	3	5
Mediterranean Games	2	0	1
Summer Universiade	0	2	0
Total	14	10	11
World Championships (LC)
Silver medal – second place	2011 Shanghai	50 m breaststroke
Silver medal – second place	2011 Shanghai	100 m breaststroke
World Championships (SC)
Gold medal – first place	2012 Istanbul	100 m breaststroke
Silver medal – second place	2010 Dubai	100 m breaststroke
Bronze medal – third place	2014 Doha	4×50 m mixed medley
Bronze medal – third place	2016 Windsor	100 m breaststroke
European Championships (LC)
Gold medal – first place	2010 Budapest	50 m breaststroke
Gold medal – first place	2012 Debrecen	100 m breaststroke
Gold medal – first place	2012 Debrecen	4×100 m medley
Silver medal – second place	2012 Debrecen	50 m breaststroke
Silver medal – second place	2018 Glasgow	50 m breaststroke
Bronze medal – third place	2010 Budapest	100 m breaststroke
Bronze medal – third place	2018 Glasgow	4×100 m mixed medley
European Championships (SC)
Gold medal – first place	2010 Eindhoven	100 m breaststroke
Gold medal – first place	2011 Szczecin	50 m breaststroke
Gold medal – first place	2011 Szczecin	4×50 m medley
Gold medal – first place	2012 Chartres	50 m breaststroke
Gold medal – first place	2012 Chartres	100 m breaststroke
Gold medal – first place	2015 Netanya	4×50 m medley
Gold medal – first place	2015 Netanya	4×50 m mixed medley
Gold medal – first place	2017 Copenhagen	50 m breaststroke
Silver medal – second place	2010 Eindhoven	4×50 m medley
Silver medal – second place	2017 Copenhagen	100 m breaststroke
Silver medal – second place	2017 Copenhagen	4×50 m medley
Bronze medal – third place	2010 Eindhoven	50 m breaststroke
Bronze medal – third place	2011 Szczecin	100 m breaststroke
Bronze medal – third place	2019 Glasgow	50 m breaststroke
Bronze medal – third place	2019 Glasgow	100 m breaststroke
Mediterranean Games
Gold medal – first place	2013 Mersin	100 m breaststroke
Gold medal – first place	2022 Oran	50 m breaststroke
Bronze medal – third place	2009 Pescara	4×100 m medley
Summer Universiade
Silver medal – second place	2009 Belgrade	100 m breaststroke
Silver medal – second place	2009 Belgrade	4×100 m medley

Fabio Scozzoli (born 8 August 1988) is an Italian swimmer. At the 2012 World Short Course Championships, he won the gold medal in the 100 metre breaststroke. He is the 2022 Mediterranean champion in the 50 metre breaststroke.

== Career ==
On 25 July 2011 won the silver medal at the World Championships in Shanghai in the 100 m breaststroke, beaten by Alexander Dale Oen and in front of Cameron van der Burgh, also establishing two Italians records: in the semi-final with a time of 59.83 and in the final with a time of 59.42. On 27 July 2011 has also won the silver medal in the 50m breaststroke, behind Brazilian Felipe França Silva and again in front of Cameron van der Burgh, also establishing the Italian record in that distance with a time of 27.17. On 13 December 2012 Scozzoli became the first Italian swimmer ever to win a gold medal in a World Swimming Championships (25 m) competition winning the Men's 100 metre breaststroke at Istanbul 2012.

Once back in Italy, the 4 August has improved the primacy of the Italian and European short course 50m breaststroke in, held by Alessandro Terrin, winning the Italian title in summer leagues.

At the 2022 Mediterranean Games, on the second day of swimming competition, Scozzoli set a new Games record in the preliminaries of the 50 metre breaststroke with a time of 27.17 seconds and qualified for the final ranking first overall. In the final, later the same day, he won the gold medal with a time of 26.97 seconds, lowering the Games record he set in the morning by 0.20 seconds and finishing 0.03 seconds ahead of short course metres world record holder in the event Emre Sakçı of Turkey.

Scozzoli was named as a team captain on the Italy swim team for the 2022 European Aquatics Championships, held in Rome, with an age of 34 years old as of the start date of the competition. In the 50 metre breaststroke on day five, he narrowly ranked third overall in the preliminaries with a time of 26.89 seconds, which was 0.04 seconds behind second-ranked Simone Cerasuolo also of Italy, and did not qualify for the semifinals as he was not one of the two fastest Italians.

== Olympic achievements ==
Year	Competition	Venue	Position	Event	Performance	Note
2012	Olympic Games	(United Kingdom) London	7th	100 m breaststroke	59.97	
2012	Olympic Games	(United Kingdom) London	14th	4 × 100 m medley relay	3:36.88	

== See also ==
- Italian swimmers multiple medalists at the internetional competitions
