= Amir Ganiel =

Israeli swimmer

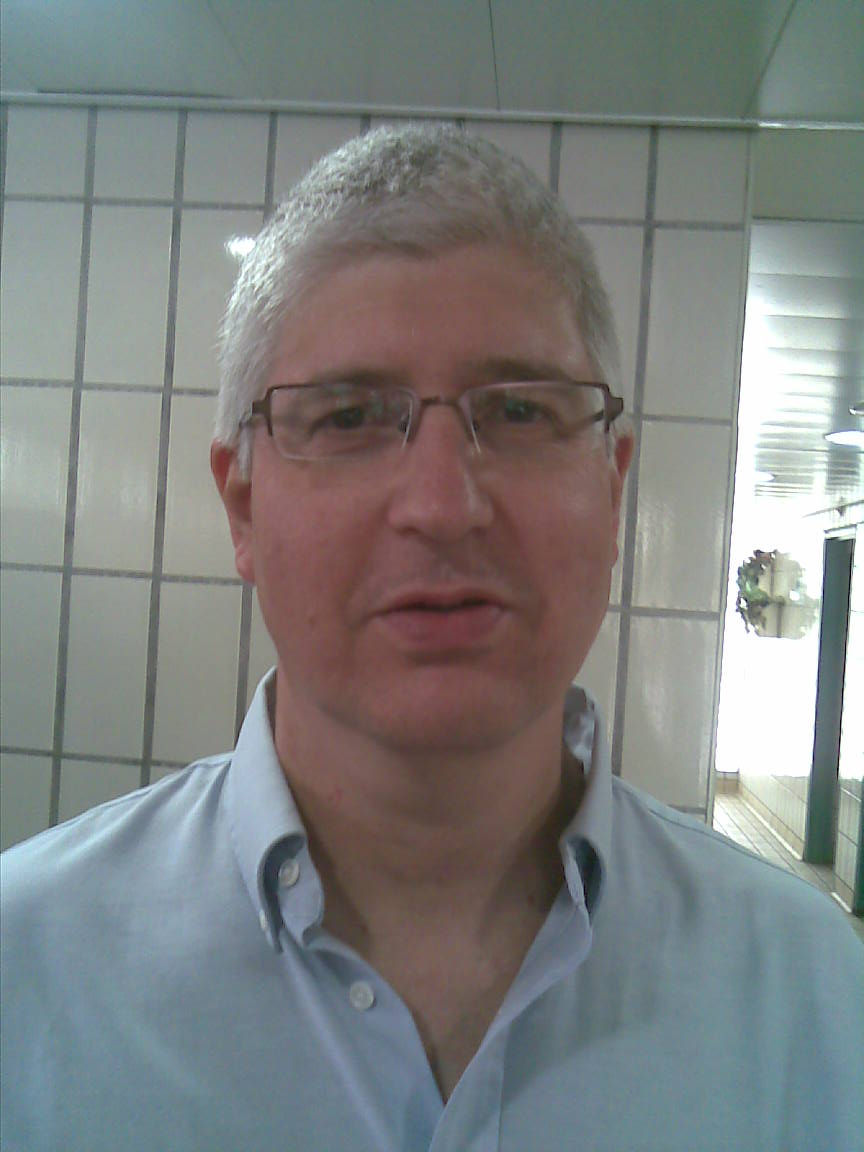
Amir Ganiel

Amir Ganiel (Hebrew: אמיר גניאל; January 6, 1963, in Jerusalem – May 14, 2018) was an Israeli swimming champion.

== Sports career ==
Ganiel was a record holder who participated in the World Championships in Berlin for the national team. He specialized in long distance. He was recognized as one of Israel's greatest swimmers. He achieved 11 Israeli records.

== Medical career ==
After his retirement from competitive swimming, Ganiel studied medicine at Ben-Gurion University of the Negev. He became a chest and heart surgeon at the Soroka University Medical Center.

== Son ==
Ganiel's son, Imri Ganiel, is also a swimmer. He is a national record holder and an Olympic swimmer of Israel.

== See also ==
- Sports in Israel
- Health care in Israel
