= Martin Liivamägi =

Estonian swimmer (born 1988)

Personal information
- Full name: Martin Liivamägi
- National team: Estonia
- Born: 5 July 1988 (age 38) Tallinn, then part of Estonian SSR, Soviet Union
- Height: 1.85 m (6 ft 1 in)
- Weight: 85 kg (187 lb)

Sport
- Sport: Swimming
- Strokes: Breaststroke, medley
- Club: California Aquatics (U.S.); Kalevi Ujumiskool
- College team: University of California, Berkeley (U.S.)
- Coach: David Durden (U.S.); Greg Meehan (U.S.)
Medal record
Men's swimming
Representing Estonia
European Junior Championships
| Silver medal – second place | 2006 Palma | 200 m medley |

Martin Liivamägi (born 5 July 1988) is an Estonian swimmer, who specialized in breaststroke and individual medley events. He is a two-time Olympian (2008 and 2012), a 2010 Pac-10 champion in the 200 m individual medley, a double NCAA team titleholder (2011 and 2012), a 43-time Estonian swimming champion, and a 24-time national record holder in different age groups. He also won a silver medal in the same stroke at the 2006 European Junior Swimming Championships in Palma de Mallorca, Spain.

== Personal life ==
Liivamagi was born in Tallinn, Estonia, the son of Kalle and Tiina Liivamägi. He attended Tallinna Saksa Gümnaasium, and also, swam for the Kalevi Ujumiskool for four years, until he graduated from high school in 2007. One year before, Liivamagi rose to international fame at the 2006 European Junior Swimming Championships in Palma de Mallorca, Spain, where he earned a silver medal in the 200 m individual medley.

== Career ==
=== 2007 FINA World Championships ===
At the 2007 FINA World Championships in Melbourne, Australia, Liivamagi placed fourteenth in the 200 m individual medley. He broke a 2:02 barrier and posted an Estonian record of 2:01.37 in the preliminary heats to secure his place for the semifinals. Liivamagi's record time also cleared a FINA A-cut, and earned a spot on the Estonian Olympic team.

=== 2008 Summer Olympics ===
Liivamagi qualified only for the men's 200 m individual medley at the 2008 Summer Olympics in Beijing. He challenged seven other swimmers on the fourth heat, including defending European champion László Cseh of Hungary. Liivamagi rounded out the field to last place by 0.48 of a second behind Spain's Brenton Cabello in 2:03.56. Liivamagi failed to advance into the semifinals, as he placed thirty-fourth overall in the preliminary heats.

Shortly after his first Olympics, Liivamagi matriculated at the University of California, Berkeley in fall 2008, where he majored in political economy with a focus on industrial societies and globalization. He also played for the California Bears swimming and diving team, under head coaches David Durden and Greg Meehan.

=== 2009 season ===
While attending UC Berkeley, Liivamagi still continued to fulfill prior commitments for the Estonian swimming team, by showing great improvement on the world stage. At the 2009 FINA World Championships in Rome, Italy, he cleared a 2-minute barrier for the first time, lowering a new Estonian record of 1:59.95 in the 200 m individual medley. He also barely missed the semifinals by recording a sixteenth fastest time and notching a final spot from the heats.

At the 2009 European Short Course Swimming Championships in Istanbul, Turkey, Liivamagi set short-course Estonian records of 53.52 and 4:12.15 in the 100 and 400 m individual medley.

=== 2010–2011 season ===
In 2010, Liivamagi won his first ever individual title at the Pac-10 Championships in Long Beach, California, posting a time of 1:43.73 in the 200 m individual medley to clear an NCAA A-cut. On the same year, he wounded up a third-place finish at the NCAA Division I Championships in Columbus, Ohio with his collegiate best of 1:43.05. For the 2011–2012 season, Liivamagi helped his college team by rebounding two back-to-back swimming titles at the NCAA Championships in Federal Way, Washington.

At the 2011 FINA World Championships in Shanghai, China, Liivamagi failed to advance into the semifinals of the 200 m individual medley, as he finished his preliminary run in twenty-sixth place, outside his record time of 2:01.88.

=== 2012 Summer Olympics ===
At the 2012 Summer Olympics in London, Liivamagi extended his program, swimming in two individual events. He cleared FINA B-standard entry times of 1:01.45 (100 m breaststroke) and 2:01.50 (200 m individual medley) from the USA Swimming Grand Prix in Indianapolis, Indiana. During his Olympic run, Liivamagi was fully trained by California Golden Bears coach Greg Meehan, who served as an assistant for the Estonian team.

On the first day of preliminaries, Liivamagi placed twenty-ninth in the 100 m breaststroke. Swimming in heat three, he posted a time of 1:01.57 to earn a fifth spot over Poland's Dawid Szulich and Israel's Imri Ganiel by one tenth of a second. In the 200 m individual medley, Liivamagi challenged seven other swimmers on the second heat, including fellow Olympic veterans Bradley Ally of Barbados and Raphaël Stacchiotti of Luxembourg. He picked up another fifth spot by 0.09 of a second behind Russia's Alexander Tikhonov in 2:01.09. Liivamagi failed to advance into the semifinals, as he placed twenty-fifth overall in the preliminaries.

== Personal bests ==
Long course
| Event | Time | Meet |
| 100 m breaststroke | 1:01.45 | 2012 USA Swimming Grand Prix |
| 200 m breaststroke | 2:15.21 | 2012 European Aquatics Championships |
| 200 m individual medley | 1:59.95 | 2009 FINA World Championships |
| 400 m individual medley | 4:29.46 | 2011 Santa Clara International Grand Prix |

Short course
| Event | Time | Meet |
| 100 m individual medley | 53.45 | 2015 XXIII Estonian SC Championships |
| 200 m individual medley | 1:55.64 | 2016 XXIV Estonian SC Championships |
| 400 m individual medley | 4:12.15 | 2009 European Short Course Championships |

== See also ==
- California Golden Bears
- List of Estonian records in swimming
