= Panagiotis Samilidis =

Greek swimmer (born 1993)

Personal information
- Nickname: Sami
- Born: 9 August 1993 (age 33) Athens
- Height: 187 cm (6 ft 2 in)
- Weight: 91 kg (201 lb)

Sport
- Sport: Swimming
- Strokes: Breaststroke
- Coach: Alexandros Nikolopoulos
Medal record
European Championships (LC)
Bronze medal – third place	2012 Debrecen	50 m breaststroke
Bronze medal – third place	2012 Debrecen	200 m breaststroke
Mediterranean Games
Gold medal – first place	2013 Mersin	200 m breaststroke
Silver medal – second place	2013 Mersin	4x100 m medley
Bronze medal – third place	2013 Mersin	100 m breaststroke
European Junior Championships
Gold medal – first place	2011 Belgrade	50 m breaststroke
Gold medal – first place	2011 Belgrade	100 m breaststroke

Panagiotis Samilidis (born 9 August 1993) is a Greek swimmer. He won two bronze medals at the 2012 European Aquatics Championships.

At the 2016 Summer Olympics, he competed in the men's 100 metre breaststroke and the men's 200 metre breaststroke events. In the heats for the 100 m breaststroke, he finished 19th with a time of 1:00.35 and did not advance to the semifinals. In the heats for the 200 m breaststroke, he finished 27th with a time of 2:12.68 and did not qualify for the semifinals. He was also part of the men's 4 × 100 m medley relay team which finished 15th in the heats and did not qualify for the final.
