= Christian vom Lehn =

German swimmer

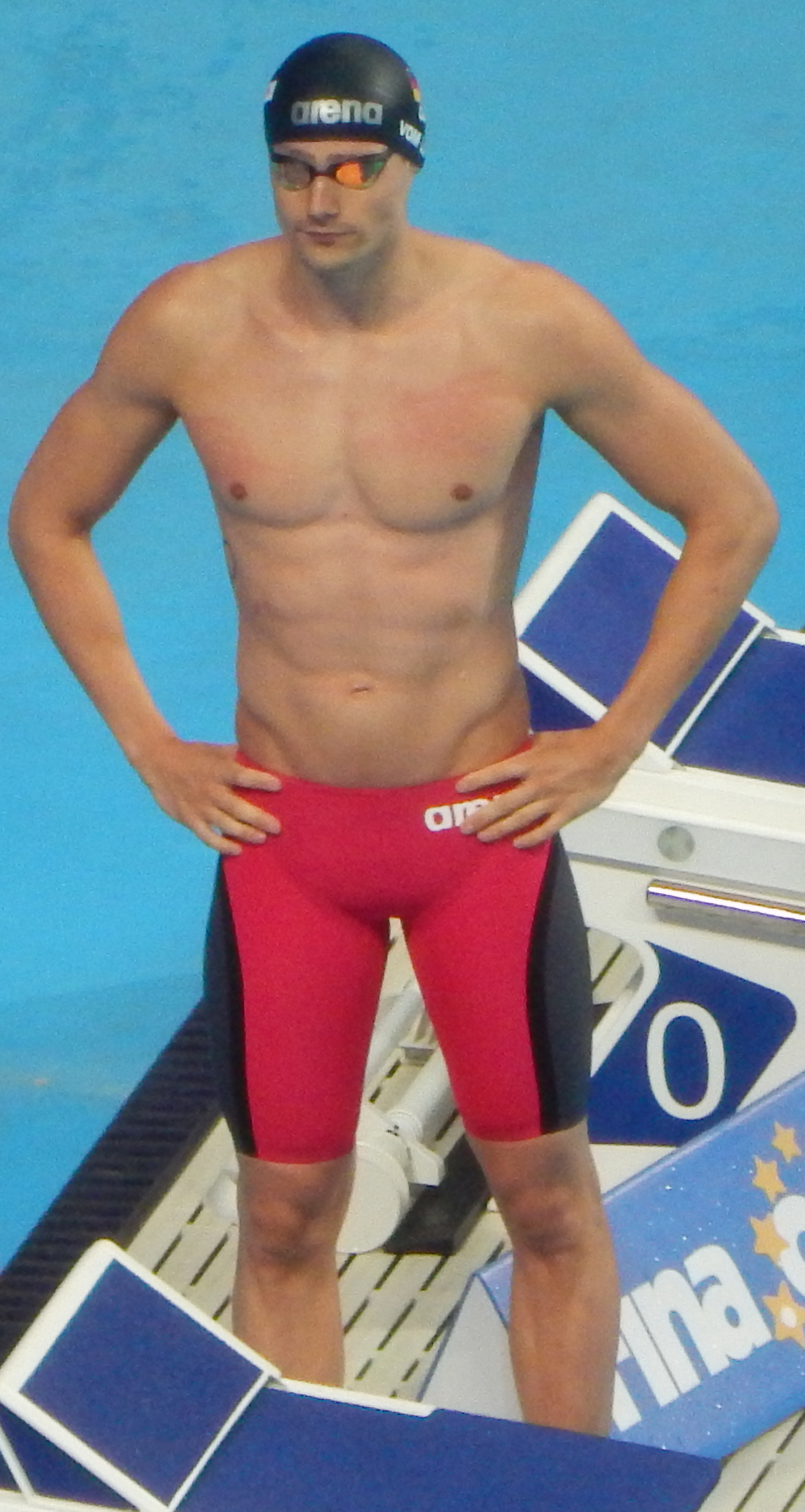
- Kazan 2015

Personal information
- Full name: Christian vom Lehn
- Nationality: German
- Born: April 14, 1992 (age 34) Wuppertal, Germany
- Height: 1.90 m (6 ft 3 in)
- Weight: 78 kg (172 lb)

Sport
- Sport: Swimming
- Strokes: Breaststroke
- Club: SG Bayer Wuppertal/Uerdingen/Dormagen
Medal record
World Championships (LC)
Bronze medal – third place	2011 Shanghai	200 m breaststroke
European Championships (LC)
Silver medal – second place	2012 Debrecen	4x100 m medley
Youth Olympic Games
Bronze medal – third place	2010 Singapore	4×100 m medley
European Junior Championships
Gold medal – first place	2009 Prague	200 m breaststroke
Gold medal – first place	2010 Helsinki	200 m breaststroke
Bronze medal – third place	2010 Helsinki	100 m breaststroke
Bronze medal – third place	2010 Helsinki	4×100 m medley

Christian vom Lehn (born 14 April 1992 in Wuppertal) is a German swimmer. He competed in two Olympics and won a World Championship bronze medal before retiring in 2021.

== Swimming Career ==
In 2011, he won a bronze medal in the men's 200 m breaststroke at the World Championships. In 2012, he was part of the German team that won silver in the 4 x 100 m men's medley relay at the European Championships. That year, he also competed at the 2012 Olympics in the 100 and 200 m men's breaststroke and the men's 4 x 100 m medley relay.

At the 2016 Summer Olympics in Rio de Janeiro, he competed in the men's 100 metre breaststroke, finishing 12th in the semifinals and failing to qualify for the final. He competed as part of the 4 x 100 medley relay team during the heats, helping the German team to qualify for the final where they finished in 7th place.

He retired in 2021, after failing to qualify for a third Olympics.
