= Jowan Qupty =

Israeli-Palestinian swimmer (born 1990)

Personal information
- Native name: جوان قبطي
- Nationality: Palestinian citizen of Israel
- Born: June 6, 1990 (age 36) Jerusalem

Sport
- Sport: Swimming
- Strokes: breaststroke
- Club: Jerusalem United
- College team: University of Missouri
Medal record
Maccabiah Games
Gold medal – first place	2005	200 m breaststroke
Bronze medal – third place	2009	200 m breaststroke
Israeli National Championship
Gold medal – first place	2011	200 m breaststroke
Gold medal – first place	2012	200 m breaststroke
Gold medal – first place	2012	100 scm breaststroke

Jowan Qupty ("koop-tee", Arabic: جوان قبطي, Hebrew: ג'ואן קופטי; born June 6, 1990) is a Palestinian-Israeli swimmer. His hometown is Jerusalem. He swims the breaststroke.

He is a three-time Israeli champion in the 100 m and 200 m breaststroke. He and Olympian Nimrod Shapira Bar-Or were high school roommates.

== Swimming career ==
Qupty started swimming at a Jerusalem YMCA. Swimming in Israel as a youth, his team was a mixture of Jews, Muslims, and Christians.

He established records in the 200 m breaststroke in the Israeli national age group for ages 14, 15, 16, and 17. At age 15, he won a gold medal in the 200 m breaststroke junior division at the 2005 Maccabiah Games.

Qupty attended high school at The Bolles School, in Jacksonville, Florida, where he was 2007 Times-Union All-First Coast Florida Swimmer of the Year, and graduated in 2008. He won the Florida high school swimming state 100 yard breaststroke championship (57.27 seconds) for the Bulldogs. At 17 years of age, Quipty was ranked # 1 in the United States in the 200 yard breaststroke. He missed most of the 2008–09 swim season due to a shoulder injury.

Qupty and fellow Israeli swimmer Nimrod Shapira Bar-Or had known each other when they were children, and swum together for the Jerusalem United swim club in Israel. They attended Bolles together, where they were roommates for two years, swim team teammates, and became best friends. Qupty's father, commenting on the friendship and teamwork between his Christian Arab Israeli son and his son's Jewish Israeli roommate/teammate, said: "Just to see them together after the race jumping and hugging each other; they were so happy. I was looking at them through my tears. Coming from our part of the world, you don't see that." The younger Qupty observed that "people were amazed all the time" that he – a Palestinian – and a Jew could coexist, and Shapira Bar-Or said: "It shows how simple the situation is. If I can live with a Palestinian guy, I'm sure in our country we can live with a couple millions of Palestinians and Israelis together."

In July 2009, he won a bronze medal in 200 m breaststroke (2:24.43), behind Israelis Tom Beeri and Daniel Malnik, in Swimming at the 2009 Maccabiah Games. In December 2010, while a junior at University of Missouri, he established the Mizzou Invitational meet record in the 200 y breaststroke(1:59.56).

In November 2011, he was training in hopes of qualifying for the 2012 Summer Olympics in London.
