= Filip Wypych =

Polish swimmer

Personal information
- Nationality: Polish
- Born: 20 April 1991 (age 35) Łodź, Poland
- Height: 1.83 m (6 ft 0 in)
- Weight: 75 kg (165 lb)

Sport
- Country: Poland
- Sport: Swimming
Medal record
European Championships (SC)
Bronze medal – third place	2017 Copenhagen	4×50 m freestyle

Filip Wypych (born 20 April 1991) is a Polish swimmer. He represented his country at the 2016 Summer Olympics.
