= Hunor Mate =

Austrian swimmer (born 1983)

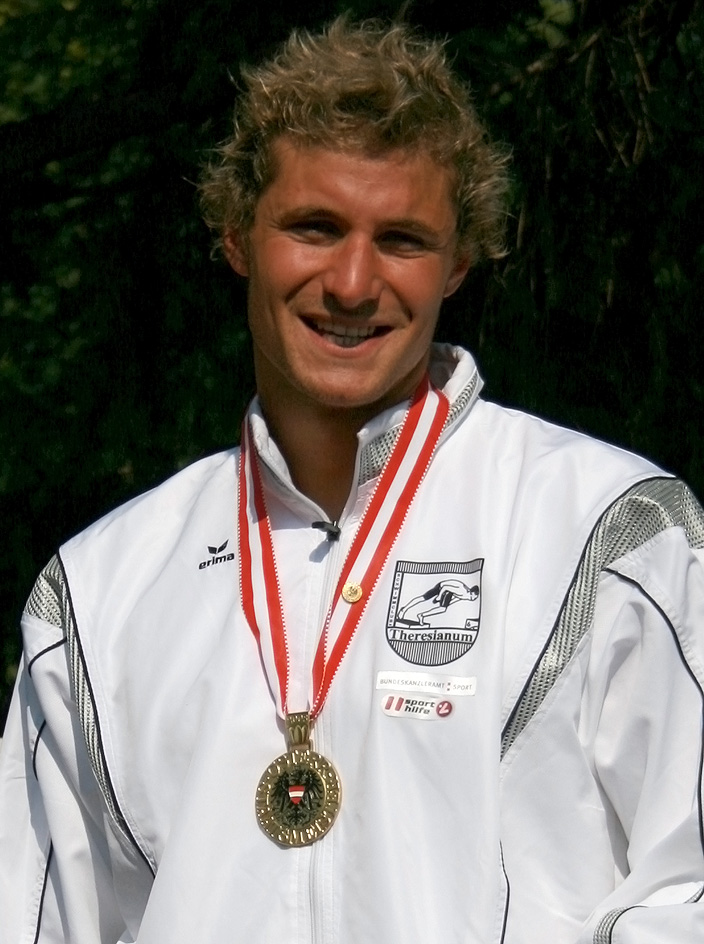

Personal information
- Full name: István Hunor Mate
- Nickname: Máté
- Nationality: Austria
- Born: 13 March 1983 (age 43) Csongrád, Hungary
- Height: 1.85 m (6 ft 1 in)
- Weight: 84 kg (185 lb)

Sport
- Sport: Swimming
- Strokes: Breaststroke
- Club: Wolfsberger SV (AUT)
- College team: Alabama Crimson Tide (USA)
- Coach: Melina Bassino (AUT); Sonya Porter (USA)

István Hunor Mate (born 13 March 1983 in Csongrád, Hungary) is an Austrian swimmer, who specialized in breaststroke events. He is also a twenty-two time Austrian national champion, five-time Austrian national record holder, and a current member of Wolfsberger SV in Vienna, Austria.

== Personal life ==
Born in Csongrád, Hungary, Mate started swimming at the age of seven, and had competed for breaststroke events in numerous national junior and senior championships. In 2005, he attended on a swimming scholarship at the University of Alabama in Tuscaloosa, Alabama, where he eventually became a varsity swimmer for the Alabama Crimson Tide.

== Swimming career ==
After graduating from the university, Mate was approached by the Austrian Swimming Federation (German: Österreichischen Schwimmverband, OSV), and accepted gradually as member of the national team. Upon his arrival in Austria, he trained for the swimming team, and represented his new nation in numerous championships, including the Olympic Games.

Mate made his international debut at the 2007 European Short Course Swimming Championships in Debrecen, where he finished in eleventh place for the 50 m, thirteenth for the 100 m, and sixteenth for the 200 m breaststroke.

Mate qualified for two swimming events at the 2008 Summer Olympics in Beijing, by clearing a FINA A-standard entry time of 2:13.21 (200 m breaststroke) from the European Championships in Eindhoven, Netherlands. In the 100 m breaststroke, Mate set an Austrian record mark of 1:00.93 to touch the wall first in heat 4 by two seconds ahead of Turkey's Demir Atasoy, but missed the semifinals by 0.21 seconds, as he placed eighteenth out of 65 swimmers on the first night of preliminaries. In his second event, 200 m breaststroke, Mate raced to third place and twenty-first overall on the same heat by 0.47 of a second behind New Zealand's Glenn Snyders, in his personal best of 2:11.56.

At the 2009 FINA World Championships in Rome, Italy, Mate set two Austrian records for the 50 and 100 m breaststroke, posting his time of 28.00 seconds and 1:00.78, respectively. He also broke three more records for the short-course swimming, including two from the 2009 European Championships in Istanbul, Turkey.

At the 2011 FINA World Championships in Shanghai, China, Mate competed again in two breaststroke events, but achieved a poor performance. He finished thirty-ninth in the 100 m breaststroke, and thirty-second in the 200 m breaststroke, posting his slowest possible time of 1:01.88, and 2:15.45, respectively. He bettered his mark in the preliminary rounds, at the 2012 European Championships in Debrecen, with a time of 2:14.79, but finished in nineteenth place.

Four years after competing in his first Olympics, Mate qualified for his second Austrian team, as a 29-year-old, at the 2012 Summer Olympics in London, by clearing a FINA B-time of 2:13.40. In the 200 m breaststroke, Mate challenged seven other swimmers on the second heat including Canada's Scott Dickens and four-time Olympian Jakob Johann Sveinsson of Iceland. He came in fifth place by nine hundredths of a second (0.09) ahead of Thailand's Nuttapong Ketin with a time of 2:15.98. Mate, however, failed to advance into the semifinals, as he placed twenty-ninth out of 64 swimmers in the preliminary heats.
