= Ömer Aslanoğlu =

Turkish swimmer (born 1988)

Personal information
- National team: Turkey
- Born: 23 May 1988 (age 38) Trabzon, Turkey
- Height: 1.80 m (5 ft 11 in)
- Weight: 84 kg (185 lb)

Sport
- Sport: Swimming
- Strokes: Breaststroke
- Club: Galatasaray Spor Kulübü

Ömer Aslanoğlu (born 23 May 1988) is a Turkish former swimmer, who specialized in the breaststroke events. He represented his nation Turkey at the 2008 Summer Olympics, and also swam for Galatasaray Sports Club (Turkish: Galatasaray Spor Kulübü).

Aslanoglu competed as a member of the Turkish squad in the men's 200 m breaststroke at the 2008 Summer Olympics in Beijing. Leading up to the Games, he eclipsed a FINA B-standard entry time of 2:17.85 from the Speedo Turkish Open Senior Championships in İzmir. Swimming in heat one, Aslanoglu raced steadily to fourth place and fifty-first overall with a time of 2:17.93, just a slight 0.08 of a second slower than his entry standard.
