= Mattia Pesce =

Italian swimmer (born 1989)

Personal information
- Nationality: Italy
- Born: 3 December 1989 (age 36) Scorzè, Italy
- Height: 183 cm (6 ft 0 in)
- Weight: 83 kg (183 lb)

Sport
- Sport: Swimming
- Strokes: Breaststroke
- Club: G.S. Fiamme Oro
- Coach: Fabrizio Bastelli
Medal record
European Championships (LC)
Bronze medal – third place	2012 Debrecen	100 m breaststroke
Summer Universiade
Bronze medal – third place	2011 Shenzhen	50 m breaststroke
World Junior Championships
Gold medal – first place	2006 Rio de Janeiro	50 m breaststroke
Silver medal – second place	2006 Rio de Janeiro	100 m breaststroke
European Junior Championships
Gold medal – first place	2006 Palma de M.	50 m breaststroke
Gold medal – first place	2007 Antwerp	50 m breaststroke
Gold medal – first place	2007 Antwerp	4×100 m medley

Mattia Pesce (born 3 December 1989) is a male Italian swimmer. He won bronze medal in 100 metres breaststroke at the 2012 European Aquatics Championships. He competed in the same event at the 2012 Summer Olympics.

Pesce is an athlete of the Gruppo Sportivo Fiamme Oro.

== Achievements ==
Year	Competition	Venue	Position	Event	Performance	Notes
2012	European Championships (LC)	(Hungary) Debrecen	3rd	100 m breaststroke	1'00"93	
2012	European Championships (LC)	(Hungary) Debrecen	4th	50 m breaststroke	27"65	
