= Aleksander Hetland =

Norwegian swimmer (born 1982)

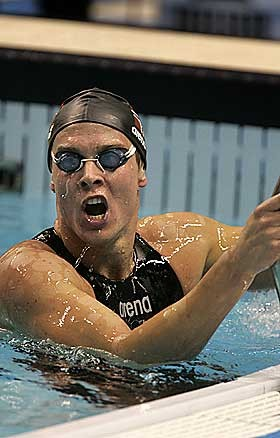
- Indianapolis, IN, USA (2004)

Personal information
- Nationality: Norway
- Born: 26 December 1982 (age 43) Tromsø, Norway

Sport
- Sport: Swimming
- Club: Bærumsvømmerne
- College team: Southern Methodist University
Medal record
World Championships (SC)
Gold medal – first place	2012 Istanbul	50 m breaststroke
Bronze medal – third place	2010 Dubai	50 m breaststroke
European SC Championships
Gold medal – first place	2009 Istanbul	50 m breaststroke
Silver medal – second place	2010 Eindhoven	50 m breaststroke
Silver medal – second place	2008 Rijeka	50 m breaststroke
Silver medal – second place	2007 Debrecen	50 m breaststroke
Silver medal – second place	2012 Chartres	50 m breaststroke
Bronze medal – third place	2006 Helsinki	100 m medley
Bronze medal – third place	2012 Chartres	4×50 m mixed medley

Aleksander Hetland (born 26 December 1982) is a Norwegian former swimmer. Hetland, who represented Bærumssvømmerne, had his strength in the medley events. He became world champion in the men's 50 metre breaststroke in the 2012 Short Course Worlds in Istanbul.

At the 2004 Short Course Worlds in Indianapolis, Indiana, US, Hetland finished fourth in the 100 m individual medley, setting the Norwegian Record with his time of 54.44.

He claimed his first international swimming medal at the 2006 Short Course European Championships in Helsinki, where he received the bronze medal in the 100 m individual medley, improving his Norwegian Record to 53.70. Hetland followed that up with success at the 2007 SC Europeans, winning the silver medal on 50 m breaststroke and setting a new Nordic Record, with 26.93. In 2009, he won gold medal in the 50 m breaststroke gold in the European short course championship in Istanbul.

He is a former member of Asker svømmeklubb.

== Television appearances ==
In 2015, Hetland won the sixth season of Mesternes Mester, an NRK series which sees former competitive Norwegian athletes compete in various exercises with the aim of receiving the "Master of Masters" title. He triumphed against former biathlete and cross-country skier Frode Andresen.

In 2019, Hetland was crowned the winner of Skal vi danse, the Norwegian version of Dancing with the Stars, with professional dancer Nadya Khamitskaya. The pair defeated influencer and fitness instructor Jørgine Massa Vasstrand and Jørgen Nilsen in the final. He returned for the 2022 Skal vi danse: All Stars season, alongside professional dancer Helene Spilling. They made it to the semi-final, where they finished in 3rd place.

== See also ==
- (in Norwegian) no:Aleksander Hetland — entry on Norsk Wikipedia
