= Viktar Vabishchevich =

Belarusian swimmer

Personal information
- Full name: Viktar Aliaksandravich Vabishchevich
- National team: Belarus
- Born: 22 March 1989 (age 37) Brest, Belarusian SSR, Soviet Union
- Height: 1.88 m (6 ft 2 in)
- Weight: 78 kg (172 lb)
- Relative: Dmitry Aliaksandravich (Brother)

Sport
- Sport: Swimming
- Strokes: Breaststroke
- Club: Army Sports Club Brest
Medal record
Men's swimming
Representing Belarus
European Junior Championships
Bronze medal – third place	2007 Antwerp	50 m breaststroke

Viktar Aliaksandravich Vabishchevich (Belarusian: Віктар Аляксандравіч Вабішчэвіч; born March 22, 1989) is a Belarusian swimmer, who specialized in breaststroke events. He posted a Belarusian record time of 28.03 seconds in the prelims of the men's 50 m breaststroke at the 2012 European Aquatics Championships in Debrecen, Hungary. He also won a bronze medal in the same event at the 2007 European Junior Swimming Championships in Antwerp, Belgium, clocking at 28.62 seconds.

Vabishchevich competed for Belarus in two swimming events at the 2008 Summer Olympics in Beijing. Leading up to the Games, he won the 100 m breaststroke race with a scintillating 1:02.19 to dip beneath a FINA B-cut (1:03.72) at the Belarus Open Championships in his native Brest. In the 100 m breaststroke, Vabishchevich wound up last and forty-ninth overall to round out the field in heat five with 1:03.29, failing to advance to the semifinals. Vabishchevich also participated in the 4 × 100 m medley relay, along with his teammates Pavel Sankovich, Yauheni Lazuka, and 2004 Olympian Stanislau Neviarouski. Swimming the breaststroke leg, Vabishchevich recorded a split in 1:01.89, but the Belarusian team had to settle for last place with a final time of 3:39.39.
