= Imri Ganiel =

Israeli swimmer

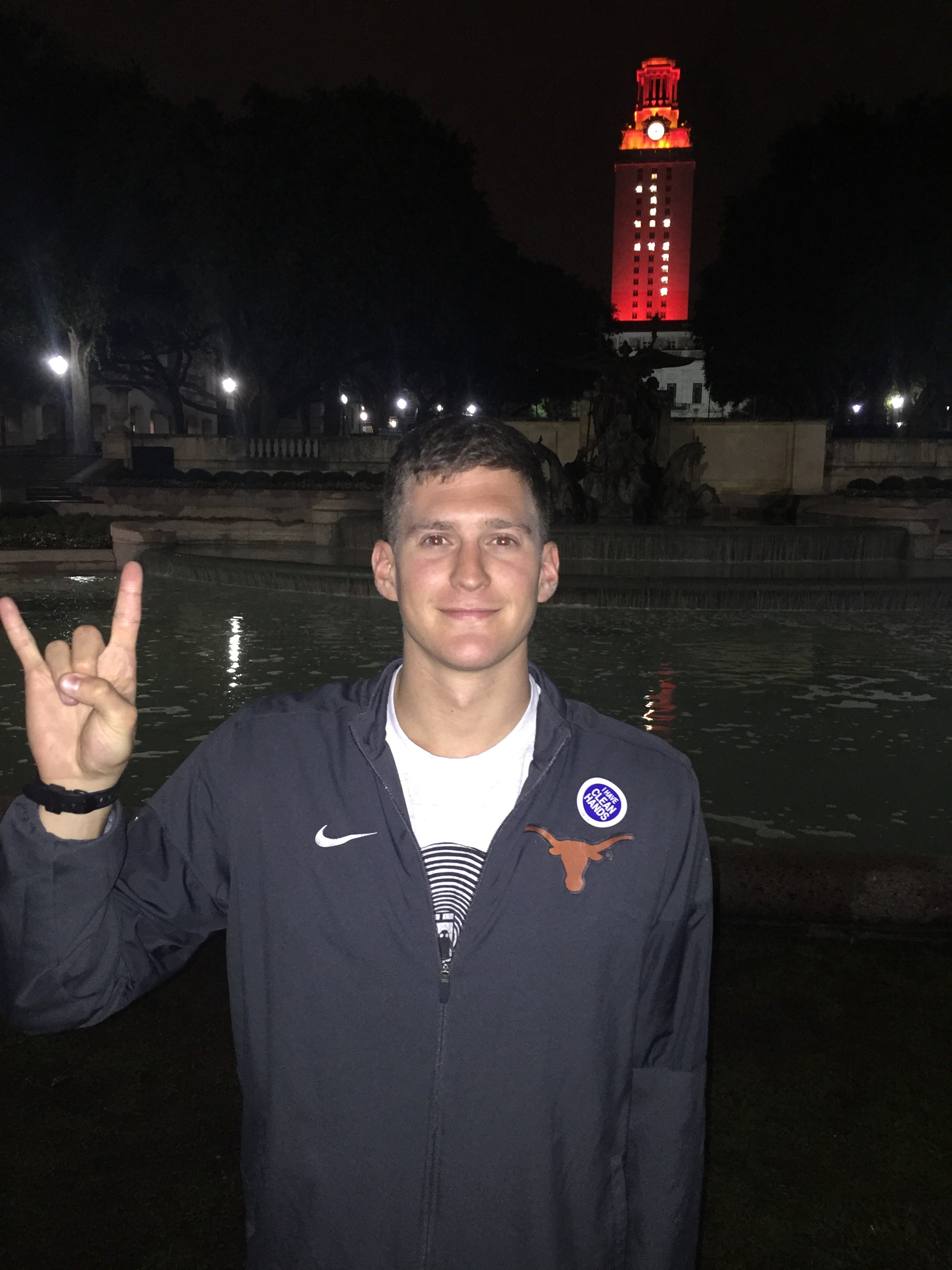
- Ganiel in 2017

Personal information
- Native name: אמרי גניאל
- Born: January 8, 1992 (age 34) Beersheba, Israel

Sport
- Sport: Swimming
- Strokes: Breaststroke

Imri Ganiel (Hebrew: אמרי גניאל; born 8 January 1992) is an Israeli swimmer.

== Biography ==
Imri Ganiel was born in Beersheba and grew up in Omer. Ganiel started swimming at the age of 8 and has competed in swimming since the age of 12. He is the son of Amir Ganiel, a former Israeli swimming champion.

== Sports career ==
Ganiel is the Israeli national record holder in the 100-meter breaststroke with a time of 1:00.96 minutes, which he broke in the final of the European Championships. At the 2012 Summer Olympics, he competed in the Men's 100 metre breaststroke, finishing in 32nd place in the heats, failing to reach the semifinals.

== See also ==
- Sport in Israel
- List of Israeli records in swimming
