= Swimming at the 2006 Asian Games =

- Venue: Hamad Aquatic Centre
- Dates: 2–7 December 2006
- Competitors: 313 from 34 nations

The Swimming competition at the 2006 Asian Games took place December 2–7 at the Hamad Aquatic Centre in Doha, Qatar. It featured 38 events (19 male, 19 female), all conducted in a long course (50m) pool.

== Schedule ==
H	Heats	F	Final

Event↓/Date →	2nd Sat		3rd Sun		4th Mon		5th Tue		6th Wed		7th Thu	
Men's 50 m freestyle					H	F						
Men's 100 m freestyle									H	F		
Men's 200 m freestyle			H	F								
Men's 400 m freestyle							H	F				
Men's 1500 m freestyle											F	
Men's 50 m backstroke											H	F
Men's 100 m backstroke							H	F				
Men's 200 m backstroke					H	F						
Men's 50 m breaststroke			H	F								
Men's 100 m breaststroke					H	F						
Men's 200 m breaststroke											H	F
Men's 50 m butterfly							H	F				
Men's 100 m butterfly			H	F								
Men's 200 m butterfly	H	F										
Men's 200 m individual medley									H	F		
Men's 400 m individual medley	H	F										
Men's 4 × 100 m freestyle relay							H	F				
Men's 4 × 200 m freestyle relay					H	F						
Men's 4 × 100 m medley relay											H	F
Women's 50 m freestyle							H	F				
Women's 100 m freestyle									H	F		
Women's 200 m freestyle	H	F										
Women's 400 m freestyle					H	F						
Women's 800 m freestyle									F			
Women's 50 m backstroke					H	F						
Women's 100 m backstroke									H	F		
Women's 200 m backstroke			H	F								
Women's 50 m breaststroke	H	F										
Women's 100 m breaststroke							H	F				
Women's 200 m breaststroke									H	F		
Women's 50 m butterfly											H	F
Women's 100 m butterfly	H	F										
Women's 200 m butterfly					H	F						
Women's 200 m individual medley											H	F
Women's 400 m individual medley			H	F								
Women's 4 × 100 m freestyle relay			H	F								
Women's 4 × 200 m freestyle relay							H	F				
Women's 4 × 100 m medley relay	F											

== Medalists ==
=== Men ===
Event	Gold		Silver		Bronze	
50 m freestyle	Rafed Al-Masri; Syria	22.41	Makoto Ito; Japan	22.77	Cai Li; China	22.95
100 m freestyle	Chen Zuo; China	49.06; AR	Park Tae-hwan; South Korea	50.02	Daisuke Hosokawa; Japan	50.25
200 m freestyle	Park Tae-hwan; South Korea	1:47.12; AR	Zhang Lin; China	1:47.85	Daisuke Hosokawa; Japan	1:49.62
400 m freestyle	Park Tae-hwan; South Korea	3:48.44; GR	Zhang Lin; China	3:49.03	Takeshi Matsuda; Japan	3:49.38
1500 m freestyle	Park Tae-hwan; South Korea	14:55.03; AR	Zhang Lin; China	15:03.13	Takeshi Matsuda; Japan	15:17.18
50 m backstroke	Junya Koga; Japan	25.40; GR	Ouyang Kunpeng; China	25.47	Sung Min; South Korea	25.57
100 m backstroke	Junichi Miyashita; Japan	54.67; GR	Ouyang Kunpeng; China	54.92	Masafumi Yamaguchi; Japan	55.78
200 m backstroke	Ryosuke Irie; Japan	1:58.85; GR	Ouyang Kunpeng; China	1:59.15	Takashi Nakano; Japan	1:59.34
50 m breaststroke	Vladislav Polyakov; Kazakhstan	28.29; GR	Kosuke Kitajima; Japan	28.38	Wang Haibo; China	28.41
100 m breaststroke	Kosuke Kitajima; Japan	1:01.13	Makoto Yamashita; Japan	1:01.50	Vladislav Polyakov; Kazakhstan	1:01.63
200 m breaststroke	Kosuke Kitajima; Japan	2:12.05	Daisuke Kimura; Japan	2:13.17	Vladislav Polyakov; Kazakhstan	2:13.60
50 m butterfly	Zhou Jiawei; China	23.94; GR	Ryo Takayasu; Japan	24.11	Wang Dong; China	24.23
100 m butterfly	Takashi Yamamoto; Japan	52.54; GR	Ryo Takayasu; Japan	52.84	Wang Dong; China	53.03
200 m butterfly	Wu Peng; China	1:54.91; GR	Takeshi Matsuda; Japan	1:55.49	Ryuichi Shibata; Japan	1:56.44
200 m individual medley	Hidemasa Sano; Japan	2:00.73	Ken Takakuwa; Japan	2:01.03	Han Kyu-chul; South Korea	2:02.56
400 m individual medley	Hidemasa Sano; Japan	4:16.18	Shinya Taniguchi; Japan	4:17.91	Han Kyu-chul; South Korea	4:21.78
4 × 100 m freestyle relay	Japan; Takamitsu Kojima; Hiroaki Yamamoto; Makoto Ito; Daisuke Hosokawa	3:18.95; AR	China; Huang Shaohua; Chen Zuo; Cai Li; Qu Jingyu	3:19.26	South Korea; Han Kyu-chul; Sung Min; Lim Nam-gyun; Park Tae-hwan	3:22.16
4 × 200 m freestyle relay	Japan; Takeshi Matsuda; Yuji Sakurai; Takamitsu Kojima; Daisuke Hosokawa	7:14.86; GR	China; Yu Chenglong; Zhang Enjian; Chen Zuo; Zhang Lin	7:15.13	South Korea; Lim Nam-gyun; Han Kyu-chul; Kang Yong-hwan; Park Tae-hwan	7:23.61
4 × 100 m medley relay	Japan; Junichi Miyashita; Kosuke Kitajima; Takashi Yamamoto; Daisuke Hosokawa	3:36.52; GR	China; Ouyang Kunpeng; Lai Zhongjian; Wang Dong; Chen Zuo	3:40.27	South Korea; Sung Min; You Seung-hun; Jeong Doo-hee; Park Tae-hwan	3:41.33

=== Women ===
Event	Gold		Silver		Bronze	
50 m freestyle	Xu Yanwei; China	25.23; GR	Pang Jiaying; China	25.84	Kaori Yamada; Japan	26.01
100 m freestyle	Xu Yanwei; China	55.02	Pang Jiaying; China	55.17	Kaori Yamada; Japan	56.29
200 m freestyle	Pang Jiaying; China	1:59.26	Yang Yu; China	2:00.73	Maki Mita; Japan	2:00.78
400 m freestyle	Yang Jieqiao; China	4:12.75	Zhu Wenrui; China	4:14.45	Lee Ji-eun; South Korea	4:14.95
800 m freestyle	Yurie Yano; Japan	8:29.51	Yang Jieqiao; China	8:38.35	Maiko Fujino; Japan	8:42.31
50 m backstroke	Zhao Jing; China	28.69; GR	Gao Chang; China	28.88	Reiko Nakamura; Japan	28.89
100 m backstroke	Reiko Nakamura; Japan	1:00.82	Xu Tianlongzi; China	1:01.22	Zhao Jing; China	1:01.72
200 m backstroke	Reiko Nakamura; Japan	2:10.33	Zhao Jing; China	2:11.54	Takami Igarashi; Japan	2:12.55
50 m breaststroke	Ji Liping; China	31.52; GR	Asami Kitagawa; Japan	32.27	Wang Qun; China	32.53
100 m breaststroke	Asami Kitagawa; Japan	1:09.13	Ji Liping; China	1:09.47	Back Su-yeon; South Korea	1:10.22
200 m breaststroke	Qi Hui; China	2:23.93; GR	Luo Nan; China	2:27.49	Jung Seul-ki; South Korea	2:27.82
50 m butterfly	Tao Li; Singapore	26.73; GR	Xu Yanwei; China	26.95	Yuka Kato; Japan	26.98
100 m butterfly	Zhou Yafei; China	58.39	Xu Yanwei; China	58.73	Tao Li; Singapore	58.96
200 m butterfly	Yurie Yano; Japan	2:09.08	Choi Hye-ra; South Korea	2:09.64	Yuko Nakanishi; Japan	2:09.75
200 m individual medley	Qi Hui; China	2:11.92; GR	Asami Kitagawa; Japan	2:14.51	Maiko Fujino; Japan	2:15.21
400 m individual medley	Qi Hui; China	4:38.31; GR	Yu Rui; China	4:39.51	Maiko Fujino; Japan	4:42.70
4 × 100 m freestyle relay	China; Xu Yanwei; Yang Yu; Wang Dan; Pang Jiaying	3:42.11	Japan; Norie Urabe; Maki Mita; Kaori Yamada; Haruka Ueda	3:45.86	Hong Kong; Hannah Wilson; Sherry Tsai; Lee Leong Kwai; Sze Hang Yu	3:48.82
4 × 200 m freestyle relay	China; Tang Yi; Yang Yu; Tang Jingzhi; Pang Jiaying	8:01.89	Japan; Maki Mita; Norie Urabe; Haruka Ueda; Yurie Yano	8:06.76	South Korea; Lee Keo-ra; Park Na-ri; Jung Yoo-jin; Lee Ji-eun	8:14.68
4 × 100 m medley relay	China; Zhao Jing; Luo Nan; Zhou Yafei; Pang Jiaying	4:04.22	Japan; Reiko Nakamura; Asami Kitagawa; Yuko Nakanishi; Maki Mita	4:05.14	South Korea; Lee Nam-eun; Jung Seul-ki; Shin Hae-in; Ryu Yoon-ji	4:09.22

== Medal table ==
Rank	Nation	Gold	Silver	Bronze	Total
1	China (CHN)	16	22	6	44
2	Japan (JPN)	16	14	17	47
3	South Korea (KOR)	3	2	11	16
4	Kazakhstan (KAZ)	1	0	2	3
5	Singapore (SIN)	1	0	1	2
6	Syria (SYR)	1	0	0	1
7	Hong Kong (HKG)	0	0	1	1
Totals (7 entries)		38	38	38	114

== Participating nations ==
A total of 313 athletes from 34 nations competed in swimming at the 2006 Asian Games:

- Bahrain (1)
- Bangladesh (4)
- Cambodia (2)
- China (38)
- Chinese Taipei (14)
- Hong Kong (21)
- India (5)
- Iran (8)
- Iraq (3)
- Japan (36)
- Kazakhstan (10)
- Kuwait (8)
- Kyrgyzstan (8)
- Laos (1)
- Lebanon (4)
- Macau (17)
- Malaysia (5)
- Maldives (2)
- Mongolia (9)
- Oman (2)
- Pakistan (2)
- Palestine (5)
- Philippines (10)
- Qatar (7)
- Saudi Arabia (3)
- Singapore (15)
- South Korea (26)
- Sri Lanka (6)
- Syria (5)
- Thailand (13)
- Turkmenistan (1)
- United Arab Emirates (2)
- Uzbekistan (17)
- Vietnam (3)
