= Swimming at the 2006 Asian Games – Women's 4 × 100 metre freestyle relay =

Women's 4 × 100 metre freestyle relay at the 2006 Asian Games
- Venue: Hamad Aquatic Centre
- Date: 3 December 2006
- Competitors: 41 from 9 nations

Medalists
gold medal	China; Xu Yanwei, Yang Yu, Wang Dan, Pang Jiaying
silver medal	Japan; Norie Urabe, Maki Mita, Kaori Yamada, Haruka Ueda
bronze medal	Hong Kong; Hannah Wilson, Sherry Tsai, Lee Leong Kwai, Sze Hang Yu

The women's 4×100m freestyle relay swimming event at the 2006 Asian Games was held on December 3, 2006 at the Hamad Aquatic Centre in Doha, Qatar.

== Schedule ==
All times are Arabia Standard Time (UTC+03:00)

Date	Time	Event
Sunday, 3 December 2006	11:08	Heats
Sunday, 3 December 2006	19:10	Final

== Records ==
Prior to this competition, the existing world, Asian and Games records were as follows.

World Record	Germany	3:35.22	Budapest, Hungary	31 July 2006
Asian Record	China	3:37.91	Rome, Italy	7 September 1994
Games Record	China	3:40.95	Busan, South Korea	3 October 2002

== Results ==
Legend

- DSQ — Disqualified

=== Heats ===
Rank	Heat	Team	Time	Notes
1	1	Japan (JPN)	3:46.84	
		Haruka Ueda	57.45	
		Kaori Yamada	56.56	
		Maki Mita	56.11	
		Norie Urabe	56.72	
2	2	China (CHN)	3:48.52	
		Wang Dan	56.48	
		Tang Yi	56.16	
		Li Mo	58.43	
		Tang Jingzhi	57.45	
3	1	South Korea (KOR)	3:48.97	
		Ryu Yoon-ji	57.61	
		Lee Keo-ra	56.16	
		Kim Dal-eun	57.03	
		Park Na-ri	58.17	
4	2	Chinese Taipei (TPE)	3:52.80	
		Yang Chin-kuei	57.63	
		Nieh Pin-chieh	57.49	
		Tsai I-chuan	59.12	
		Lin Man-hsu	58.56	
5	2	Singapore (SIN)	3:58.47	
		Ho Shu Yong	59.42	
		Tao Li	1:00.44	
		Mylene Ong	59.02	
		Lynette Ng	59.59	
6	1	Hong Kong (HKG)	3:59.66	
		Lee Leong Kwai	58.38	
		Ng Ka Man	59.91	
		Fung Wing Yan	58.71	
		Sherry Tsai	1:02.66	
7	2	Thailand (THA)	4:00.40	
		Piyaporn Tantiniti	59.83	
		Pannika Prachgosin	1:00.93	
		Natthanan Junkrajang	59.00	
		Jiratida Phinyosophon	1:00.64	
8	2	Macau (MAC)	4:10.10	
		Ma Cheok Mei	1:00.18	
		Lei On Kei	1:03.29	
		Fong Man Wai	1:03.89	
		Kuan Weng I	1:02.74	
9	1	Uzbekistan (UZB)	4:10.28	
		Irina Shlemova	59.66	
		Yulduz Kuchkarova	1:04.14	
		Ekaterina Mamatkulova	1:03.69	
		Mariya Bugakova	1:02.79	

=== Final ===
Rank	Team	Time	Notes
1st place, gold medalist(s)	China (CHN)	3:42.11	
	Xu Yanwei	54.99	
	Yang Yu	55.99	
	Wang Dan	55.60	
	Pang Jiaying	55.53	
2nd place, silver medalist(s)	Japan (JPN)	3:45.86	
	Norie Urabe	57.02	
	Maki Mita	56.21	
	Kaori Yamada	56.10	
	Haruka Ueda	56.53	
3rd place, bronze medalist(s)	Hong Kong (HKG)	3:48.82	
	Hannah Wilson	56.64	
	Sherry Tsai	57.12	
	Lee Leong Kwai	57.70	
	Sze Hang Yu	57.36	
4	Chinese Taipei (TPE)	3:51.93	
	Yang Chin-kuei	57.12	
	Tsai I-chuan	59.15	
	Lin Man-hsu	58.62	
	Nieh Pin-chieh	57.04	
5	Singapore (SIN)	3:53.33	
	Ho Shu Yong	58.80	
	Tao Li	58.06	
	Mylene Ong	58.28	
	Lynette Ng	58.19	
6	Thailand (THA)	3:54.27	
	Natthanan Junkrajang	58.15	
	Jiratida Phinyosophon	57.86	
	Piyaporn Tantiniti	59.34	
	Pannika Prachgosin	58.92	
7	Macau (MAC)	4:07.90	
	Ma Cheok Mei	59.63	
	Lei On Kei	1:02.42	
	Fong Man Wai	1:03.03	
	Kuan Weng I	1:02.82	
—	South Korea (KOR)	DSQ	
	Lee Keo-ra	56.65	
	Kim Dal-eun	56.42	
	Park Na-ri	57.78	
	Ryu Yoon-ji		
