= Swimming at the 2006 Asian Games – Women's 4 × 100 metre medley relay =

Women's 4 × 100 metre medley relay at the 2006 Asian Games
- Venue: Hamad Aquatic Centre
- Date: 2 December 2006
- Competitors: 32 from 8 nations

Medalists
gold medal	China; Zhao Jing, Luo Nan, Zhou Yafei, Pang Jiaying
silver medal	Japan; Reiko Nakamura, Asami Kitagawa, Yuko Nakanishi, Maki Mita
bronze medal	South Korea; Lee Nam-eun, Jung Seul-ki, Shin Hae-in, Ryu Yoon-ji

The women's 4×100m medley relay swimming event at the 2006 Asian Games was held on December 2, 2006, at the Hamad Aquatic Centre in Doha, Qatar.

== Schedule ==
All times are Arabia Standard Time (UTC+03:00)

Date	Time	Event
Saturday, 2 December 2006	19:06	Final

== Records ==
Prior to this competition, the existing world, Asian and Games records were as follows.

World Record	Australia	3:56.30	Melbourne, Australia	21 March 2006
Asian Record	China	3:59.89	Barcelona, Spain	26 July 2003
Games Record	China	4:00.21	Busan, South Korea	5 October 2002

== Results ==
Rank	Team	Time	Notes
1st place, gold medalist(s)	China (CHN)	4:04.22	
	Zhao Jing	1:01.38	
	Luo Nan	1:08.79	
	Zhou Yafei	57.96	
	Pang Jiaying	56.09	
2nd place, silver medalist(s)	Japan (JPN)	4:05.14	
	Reiko Nakamura	1:01.07	
	Asami Kitagawa	1:08.35	
	Yuko Nakanishi	59.56	
	Maki Mita	56.16	
3rd place, bronze medalist(s)	South Korea (KOR)	4:09.22	
	Lee Nam-eun	1:02.85	
	Jung Seul-ki	1:09.98	
	Shin Hae-in	59.74	
	Ryu Yoon-ji	56.65	
4	Hong Kong (HKG)	4:14.58	
	Sherry Tsai	1:02.74	
	Suen Ka Yi	1:13.74	
	Sze Hang Yu	1:01.58	
	Hannah Wilson	56.52	
5	Singapore (SIN)	4:16.87	
	Tao Li	1:04.47	
	Nicolette Teo	1:12.16	
	Joscelin Yeo	1:01.45	
	Mylene Ong	58.69	
6	Chinese Taipei (TPE)	4:22.14	
	He Hsu-jung	1:06.46	
	Lin Man-hsu	1:15.13	
	Yang Chin-kuei	1:03.28	
	Nieh Pin-chieh	57.27	
7	Macau (MAC)	4:34.50	
	Kuan Weng I	1:10.45	
	Lei On Kei	1:16.75	
	Fong Man Wai	1:08.34	
	Ma Cheok Mei	58.96	
8	Uzbekistan (UZB)	4:38.16	
	Maftunabonu Tukhtasinova	1:10.84	
	Olga Gnedovskaya	1:18.92	
	Galina Dukhanova	1:08.64	
	Irina Shlemova	59.76	
