= Swimming at the 2006 Asian Games – Women's 4 × 200 metre freestyle relay =

Women's 4 × 200 metre freestyle relay at the 2006 Asian Games
- Venue: Hamad Aquatic Centre
- Date: 5 December 2006
- Competitors: 41 from 9 nations

Medalists
gold medal	China; Tang Yi, Yang Yu, Tang Jingzhi, Pang Jiaying
silver medal	Japan; Maki Mita, Norie Urabe, Haruka Ueda, Yurie Yano
bronze medal	South Korea; Lee Keo-ra, Park Na-ri, Jung Yoo-jin, Lee Ji-eun

The women's 4 × 200 m freestyle relay swimming event at the 2006 Asian Games was held on December 5, 2006, at the Hamad Aquatic Centre in Doha, Qatar.

== Schedule ==
All times are Arabia Standard Time (UTC+03:00)

Date	Time	Event
Tuesday, 5 December 2006	11:13	Heats
Tuesday, 5 December 2006	19:08	Final

== Records ==
Prior to this competition, the existing world, Asian and Games records were as follows.

World Record	Germany	7:50.82	Budapest, Hungary	3 August 2006
Asian Record	China	7:55.97	Athens, Greece	18 August 2004
Games Record	China	7:58.46	Busan, South Korea	1 October 2002

== Results ==
=== Heats ===
Rank	Heat	Team	Time	Notes
1	2	China (CHN)	8:07.90	
		Yang Yu	2:02.21	
		Tang Yi	2:01.17	
		Tang Jingzhi	2:01.91	
		Yang Jieqiao	2:02.61	
2	2	Japan (JPN)	8:18.63	
		Haruka Ueda	2:02.72	
		Maki Mita	2:03.73	
		Yurie Yano	2:03.30	
		Norie Urabe	2:08.88	
3	1	Thailand (THA)	8:38.92	
		Wenika Kaewchaiwong	2:09.29	
		Natthanan Junkrajang	2:08.01	
		Jiratida Phinyosophon	2:09.53	
		Pilin Tachakittiranan	2:12.09	
4	2	Hong Kong (HKG)	8:40.29	
		Ng Ka Man	2:09.09	
		Lee Leong Kwai	2:11.43	
		Fung Wing Yan	2:12.34	
		Carmen Nam	2:07.43	
5	1	Singapore (SIN)	8:46.16	
		Tan Pei Shan	2:12.27	
		Mylene Ong	2:11.19	
		Quah Ting Wen	2:08.13	
		Tao Li	2:14.57	
6	1	Chinese Taipei (TPE)	8:46.28	
		Lin Man-hsu	2:11.01	
		Tsai I-chuan	2:13.14	
		Nieh Pin-chieh	2:17.28	
		Yang Chin-kuei	2:04.85	
7	2	South Korea (KOR)	8:47.32	
		Lee Keo-ra	2:05.05	
		Park Na-ri	2:09.46	
		Jung Yoo-jin	2:18.95	
		Lee Ji-eun	2:13.86	
8	2	Uzbekistan (UZB)	9:07.32	
		Irina Shlemova	2:13.58	
		Yulduz Kuchkarova	2:18.50	
		Maftunabonu Tukhtasinova	2:16.00	
		Mariya Bugakova	2:19.24	
9	1	Macau (MAC)	9:22.57	
		Fong Man Wai	2:21.37	
		Kuan Weng I	2:18.64	
		Lei On Kei	2:20.86	
		Ma Cheok Mei	2:21.70	

=== Final ===
Rank	Team	Time	Notes
1st place, gold medalist(s)	China (CHN)	8:01.89	
	Tang Yi	2:00.18	
	Yang Yu	1:59.24	
	Tang Jingzhi	2:01.16	
	Pang Jiaying	2:01.31	
2nd place, silver medalist(s)	Japan (JPN)	8:06.76	
	Maki Mita	2:01.17	
	Norie Urabe	2:00.52	
	Haruka Ueda	2:01.59	
	Yurie Yano	2:03.48	
3rd place, bronze medalist(s)	South Korea (KOR)	8:14.68	
	Lee Keo-ra	2:02.39	
	Park Na-ri	2:04.43	
	Jung Yoo-jin	2:03.96	
	Lee Ji-eun	2:03.90	
4	Chinese Taipei (TPE)	8:25.10	
	Yang Chin-kuei	2:02.78	
	Lin Man-hsu	2:07.12	
	Tsai I-chuan	2:09.45	
	Nieh Pin-chieh	2:05.75	
5	Hong Kong (HKG)	8:25.46	
	Hannah Wilson	2:07.21	
	Sherry Tsai	2:05.52	
	Carmen Nam	2:07.92	
	Sze Hang Yu	2:04.81	
6	Thailand (THA)	8:27.84	
	Natthanan Junkrajang	2:06.05	
	Jiratida Phinyosophon	2:06.41	
	Pilin Tachakittiranan	2:07.31	
	Wenika Kaewchaiwong	2:08.07	
7	Singapore (SIN)	8:31.78	
	Quah Ting Wen	2:05.46	
	Mylene Ong	2:08.01	
	Tan Pei Shan	2:08.92	
	Ho Shu Yong	2:09.39	
8	Uzbekistan (UZB)	9:10.15	
	Irina Shlemova	2:14.55	
	Yulduz Kuchkarova	2:18.63	
	Maftunabonu Tukhtasinova	2:16.24	
	Mariya Bugakova	2:20.73	
