= Swimming at the 2006 Asian Games – Women's 100 metre freestyle =

Women's 100 metre freestyle at the 2006 Asian Games
- Venue: Hamad Aquatic Centre
- Date: 6 December 2006
- Competitors: 28 from 18 nations

Medalists
gold medal	Xu Yanwei	China
silver medal	Pang Jiaying	China
bronze medal	Kaori Yamada	Japan

The women's 100m freestyle swimming event at the 2006 Asian Games was held on December 6, 2006 at the Hamad Aquatic Centre in Doha, Qatar.

== Schedule ==
All times are Arabia Standard Time (UTC+03:00)

Date	Time	Event
Wednesday, 6 December 2006	10:00	Heats
Wednesday, 6 December 2006	18:00	Final

== Records ==
Prior to this competition, the existing world, Asian and Games records were as follows.

World Record	Britta Steffen (GER)	53.30	Budapest, Hungary	2 August 2006
Asian Record	Le Jingyi (CHN)	54.01	Rome, Italy	5 September 1994
Games Record	Shan Ying (CHN)	54.40	Hiroshima, Japan	3 October 1994

== Results ==
=== Heats ===
Rank	Heat	Athlete	Time	Notes
1	3	Kaori Yamada (JPN)	56.74	
2	4	Lee Keo-ra (KOR)	56.75	
3	2	Maki Mita (JPN)	56.92	
3	4	Pang Jiaying (CHN)	56.92	
5	3	Xu Yanwei (CHN)	57.37	
6	3	Hannah Wilson (HKG)	57.43	
7	4	Ryu Yoon-ji (KOR)	57.44	
8	2	Yang Chin-kuei (TPE)	57.78	
9	2	Nieh Pin-chieh (TPE)	58.02	
10	3	Lee Leong Kwai (HKG)	58.78	
11	4	Jiratida Phinyosophon (THA)	58.83	
12	3	Pannika Prachgosin (THA)	59.05	
13	2	Mylene Ong (SIN)	59.29	
14	4	Lynette Ng (SIN)	59.39	
15	2	Erica Totten (PHI)	59.44	
16	2	Irina Shlemova (UZB)	59.59	
17	4	Chui Lai Kwan (MAS)	1:00.13	
18	3	Ma Cheok Mei (MAC)	1:00.15	
19	4	Shikha Tandon (IND)	1:00.68	
20	4	Galina Dukhanova (UZB)	1:02.99	
21	3	Valentina Nagornaia (KGZ)	1:03.05	
22	2	Jennifer Kabalan (LIB)	1:04.70	
23	3	Kiran Khan (PAK)	1:05.52	
24	1	Sameera Al-Bitar (BRN)	1:05.88	
25	1	Batjargalyn Telmen (MGL)	1:06.55	
26	2	Debora Mac (MAC)	1:06.63	
27	1	Ameena Fakhro (QAT)	1:06.77	
28	1	Nora Al-Awam (QAT)	1:07.54	

=== Final ===
Rank	Athlete	Time	Notes
1st place, gold medalist(s)	Xu Yanwei (CHN)	55.02	
2nd place, silver medalist(s)	Pang Jiaying (CHN)	55.17	
3rd place, bronze medalist(s)	Kaori Yamada (JPN)	56.29	
4	Lee Keo-ra (KOR)	56.42	
5	Ryu Yoon-ji (KOR)	56.62	
6	Hannah Wilson (HKG)	56.77	
7	Maki Mita (JPN)	56.78	
8	Yang Chin-kuei (TPE)	57.25	
