= Swimming at the 2006 Asian Games – Women's 50 metre freestyle =

Women's 50 metre freestyle at the 2006 Asian Games
- Venue: Hamad Aquatic Centre
- Date: 5 December 2006
- Competitors: 33 from 22 nations

Medalists
gold medal	Xu Yanwei	China
silver medal	Pang Jiaying	China
bronze medal	Kaori Yamada	Japan

The women's 50m freestyle swimming event at the 2006 Asian Games was held on December 5, 2006 at the Hamad Aquatic Centre in Doha, Qatar.

== Schedule ==
All times are Arabia Standard Time (UTC+03:00)

Date	Time	Event
Tuesday, 5 December 2006	10:48	Heats
Tuesday, 5 December 2006	18:38	Final

== Records ==
Prior to this competition, the existing world, Asian and Games records were as follows.

World Record	Inge de Bruijn (NED)	24.13	Sydney, Australia	22 September 2000
Asian Record	Le Jingyi (CHN)	24.51	Rome, Italy	11 September 1994
Games Record	Le Jingyi (CHN)	25.26	Hiroshima, Japan	8 October 1994

== Results ==
=== Heats ===
Rank	Heat	Athlete	Time	Notes
1	5	Xu Yanwei (CHN)	25.36	
2	4	Pang Jiaying (CHN)	26.01	
3	5	Kaori Yamada (JPN)	26.13	
4	4	Ryu Yoon-ji (KOR)	26.16	
5	4	Kim Dal-eun (KOR)	26.27	
6	3	Hannah Wilson (HKG)	26.45	
7	5	Nieh Pin-chieh (TPE)	26.53	
8	5	Sze Hang Yu (HKG)	26.60	
9	3	Norie Urabe (JPN)	26.72	
10	3	Yang Chin-kuei (TPE)	27.14	
11	3	Pannika Prachgosin (THA)	27.15	
12	3	Lynette Ng (SIN)	27.22	
13	4	Piyaporn Tantiniti (THA)	27.40	
13	4	Shikha Tandon (IND)	27.40	
15	3	Ho Shu Yong (SIN)	27.45	
16	4	Chui Lai Kwan (MAS)	27.55	
17	5	Irina Shlemova (UZB)	27.65	
18	5	Ma Cheok Mei (MAC)	27.76	
19	4	Erica Totten (PHI)	27.91	
20	5	Mariya Bugakova (UZB)	28.22	
21	4	Mireille Hakimeh (SYR)	28.80	
22	5	Mayumi Raheem (SRI)	28.87	
23	3	Valentina Nagornaia (KGZ)	29.25	
24	3	Jennifer Kabalan (LIB)	29.58	
25	2	Debora Mac (MAC)	29.97	
26	1	Batjargalyn Telmen (MGL)	30.11	
27	2	Sameera Al-Bitar (BRN)	30.58	
28	2	Ameena Fakhro (QAT)	30.65	
29	2	Nora Al-Awam (QAT)	31.32	
30	1	Khürelbaataryn Sainzayaa (MGL)	31.59	
31	2	Zakiya Nassar (PLE)	32.37	
32	1	Hem Thon Vitiny (CAM)	34.28	
33	2	Soulamngeun Khetla (LAO)	35.75	

=== Final ===
Rank	Athlete	Time	Notes
1st place, gold medalist(s)	Xu Yanwei (CHN)	25.23	GR
2nd place, silver medalist(s)	Pang Jiaying (CHN)	25.84	
3rd place, bronze medalist(s)	Kaori Yamada (JPN)	26.01	
4	Ryu Yoon-ji (KOR)	26.06	
5	Kim Dal-eun (KOR)	26.27	
6	Hannah Wilson (HKG)	26.38	
7	Sze Hang Yu (HKG)	26.46	
8	Nieh Pin-chieh (TPE)	26.52	
