= Swimming at the 2006 Asian Games – Women's 200 metre freestyle =

Women's 200 metre freestyle at the 2006 Asian Games
- Venue: Hamad Aquatic Centre
- Date: 2 December 2006
- Competitors: 21 from 14 nations

Medalists
gold medal	Pang Jiaying	China
silver medal	Yang Yu	China
bronze medal	Maki Mita	Japan

The women's 200m freestyle swimming event at the 2006 Asian Games was held on December 2, 2006, at the Hamad Aquatic Centre in Doha, Qatar.

== Schedule ==
All times are Arabia Standard Time (UTC+03:00)

Date	Time	Event
Saturday, 2 December 2006	10:00	Heats
Saturday, 2 December 2006	18:00	Final

== Records ==
Prior to this competition, the existing world, Asian and Games records were as follows.

World Record	Franziska van Almsick (GER)	1:56.64	Berlin, Germany	3 August 2002
Asian Record	Lü Bin (CHN)	1:56.89	Rome, Italy	6 September 1994
Games Record	Yang Yu (CHN)	1:58.43	Busan, South Korea	30 September 2002

== Results ==
=== Heats ===
Rank	Heat	Athlete	Time	Notes
1	2	Maki Mita (JPN)	2:00:44	
2	3	Pang Jiaying (CHN)	2:01:60	
3	1	Yang Yu (CHN)	2:02:75	
4	1	Lee Ji-eun (KOR)	2:03:10	
5	3	Yang Chin-kuei (TPE)	2:03:22	
6	2	Norie Urabe (JPN)	2:03:23	
7	3	Jiratida Phinyosophon (THA)	2:05:46	
8	1	Nieh Pin-chieh (TPE)	2:05:71	
9	2	Quah Ting Wen (SIN)	2:07:51	
10	3	Mylene Ong (SIN)	2:08:33	
11	2	Ng Ka Man (HKG)	2:08:49	
12	1	Ong Ming Xiu (MAS)	2:08:81	
13	2	Erica Totten (PHI)	2:08:83	
14	3	Natthanan Junkrajang (THA)	2:09:12	
15	1	Marichi Gandionco (PHI)	2:09:72	
16	3	Fung Wing Yan (HKG)	2:11:94	
17	1	Fong Man Wai (MAC)	2:18.29	
18	2	Valentina Nagornaia (KGZ)	2:22:06	
19	2	Kiran Khan (PAK)	2:23:00	
20	3	Ekaterina Mamatkulova (UZB)	2:27:93	
21	1	Imara Fahim (SRI)	2:28:89	

=== Final ===
Rank	Athlete	Time	Notes
1st place, gold medalist(s)	Pang Jiaying (CHN)	1:59.26	
2nd place, silver medalist(s)	Yang Yu (CHN)	2:00.73	
3rd place, bronze medalist(s)	Maki Mita (JPN)	2:00.78	
4	Norie Urabe (JPN)	2:01.61	
5	Yang Chin-kuei (TPE)	2:02.21	
6	Lee Ji-eun (KOR)	2:02.89	
7	Jiratida Phinyosophon (THA)	2:04.91	
8	Nieh Pin-chieh (TPE)	2:07.35	
