= Swimming at the 2006 Asian Games – Women's 50 metre butterfly =

Women's 50 metre butterfly at the 2006 Asian Games
- Venue: Hamad Aquatic Centre
- Date: 7 December 2006
- Competitors: 25 from 14 nations

Medalists
gold medal	Tao Li	Singapore
silver medal	Xu Yanwei	China
bronze medal	Yuka Kato	Japan

The women's 50m butterfly swimming event at the 2006 Asian Games was held on December 7, 2006 at the Hamad Aquatic Centre in Doha, Qatar.

== Schedule ==
All times are Arabia Standard Time (UTC+03:00)

Date	Time	Event
Thursday, 7 December 2006	10:40	Heats
Thursday, 7 December 2006	18:37	Final

== Records ==
Prior to this competition, the existing world, Asian and Games records were as follows.

World Record	Anna-Karin Kammerling (SWE)	25.57	Berlin, Germany	30 July 2002
Asian Record	Zhou Yafei (CHN)	26.30	Hangzhou, China	4 September 2006
Games Record	Xu Yanwei (CHN)	27.38	Doha, Qatar	2 December 2006

== Results ==
=== Heats ===
Rank	Heat	Athlete	Time	Notes
1	4	Zhou Yafei (CHN)	26.78	GR
2	2	Tao Li (SIN)	26.87	
3	4	Yuka Kato (JPN)	26.91	
4	3	Ayako Doi (JPN)	27.32	
5	3	Xu Yanwei (CHN)	27.33	
6	2	Joscelin Yeo (SIN)	27.63	
7	3	Shin Hae-in (KOR)	27.79	
8	3	Sze Hang Yu (HKG)	27.95	
9	3	Ryu Yoon-ji (KOR)	28.29	
10	2	Natnapa Prommuenwai (THA)	28.65	
11	2	Yang Chin-kuei (TPE)	29.07	
12	4	Hannah Wilson (HKG)	29.12	
13	4	Tsai I-chuan (TPE)	29.35	
14	2	Irina Shlemova (UZB)	29.59	
15	4	Ma Cheok Mei (MAC)	29.73	
16	1	Erica Totten (PHI)	30.87	
17	4	Mariya Bugakova (UZB)	30.91	
18	3	Marichi Gandionco (PHI)	31.50	
19	2	Lam Sin I (MAC)	31.55	
20	4	Mireille Hakimeh (SYR)	31.72	
21	3	Mayumi Raheem (SRI)	31.78	
22	4	Miniruwani Samarakoon (SRI)	32.36	
23	2	Nivine El-Achi (LIB)	33.13	
24	1	Ameena Fakhro (QAT)	33.16	
25	1	Nora Al-Awam (QAT)	33.48	

=== Final ===
Rank	Athlete	Time	Notes
1st place, gold medalist(s)	Tao Li (SIN)	26.73	GR
2nd place, silver medalist(s)	Xu Yanwei (CHN)	26.95	
3rd place, bronze medalist(s)	Yuka Kato (JPN)	26.98	
4	Zhou Yafei (CHN)	26.99	
5	Ayako Doi (JPN)	27.07	
6	Sze Hang Yu (HKG)	27.53	
7	Joscelin Yeo (SIN)	27.69	
8	Shin Hae-in (KOR)	27.74	
