= Swimming at the 2006 Asian Games – Women's 100 metre butterfly =

Women's 100 metre butterfly at the 2006 Asian Games
- Venue: Hamad Aquatic Centre
- Date: 2 December 2006
- Competitors: 20 from 13 nations

Medalists
| gold medal | Zhou Yafei | China |
| silver medal | Xu Yanwei | China |
| bronze medal | Tao Li | Singapore |

The women's 100m butterfly swimming event at the 2006 Asian Games was held on December 2, 2006 at the Hamad Aquatic Centre in Doha, Qatar.

== Schedule ==
All times are Arabia Standard Time (UTC+03:00)

| Date | Time | Event |
|---|---|---|
| Saturday, 2 December 2006 | 10:35 | Heats |
| Saturday, 2 December 2006 | 18:14 | Final |

== Records ==
Prior to this competition, the existing world, Asian and Games records were as follows.

| World Record | Inge de Bruijn (NED) | 56.61 | Sydney, Australia | 17 September 2000 |
| Asian Record | Zhou Yafei (CHN) | 58.32 | Hangzhou, China | 4 September 2006 |
| Games Record | Liu Limin (CHN) | 58.38 | Hiroshima, Japan | 6 October 1994 |

== Results ==
=== Heats ===
| Rank | Heat | Athlete | Time | Notes |
|---|---|---|---|---|
| 1 | 1 | Tao Li (SIN) | 59.53 | |
| 2 | 3 | Zhou Yafei (CHN) | 59.74 | |
| 3 | 3 | Ayako Doi (JPN) | 1:00.02 | |
| 4 | 1 | Yuko Nakanishi (JPN) | 1:00.54 | |
| 5 | 3 | Choi Hye-ra (KOR) | 1:00.56 | |
| 6 | 2 | Shin Hae-in (KOR) | 1:00.60 | |
| 7 | 2 | Xu Yanwei (CHN) | 1:00.78 | |
| 8 | 1 | Joscelin Yeo (SIN) | 1:00.97 | |
| 9 | 2 | Hannah Wilson (HKG) | 1:01.26 | |
| 10 | 3 | Sze Hang Yu (HKG) | 1:02.96 | |
| 11 | 2 | Natnapa Prommuenwai (THA) | 1:03.86 | |
| 12 | 2 | Irina Shlemova (UZB) | 1:04.90 | |
| 13 | 1 | Ma Cheok Mei (MAC) | 1:05.06 | |
| 14 | 3 | Tsai I-chuan (TPE) | 1:05.93 | |
| 15 | 2 | Galina Dukhanova (UZB) | 1:07.17 | |
| 16 | 1 | Erica Totten (PHI) | 1:08.04 | |
| 17 | 3 | Lam Sin I (MAC) | 1:09.15 | |
| 18 | 1 | Miniruwani Samarakoon (SRI) | 1:12.62 | |
| 19 | 3 | Nivine El-Achi (LIB) | 1:16.94 | |
| 20 | 2 | Ameena Fakhro (QAT) | 1:17.54 | |

=== Final ===
| Rank | Athlete | Time | Notes |
|---|---|---|---|
| 1st place, gold medalist(s) | Zhou Yafei (CHN) | 58.39 | |
| 2nd place, silver medalist(s) | Xu Yanwei (CHN) | 58.73 | |
| 3rd place, bronze medalist(s) | Tao Li (SIN) | 58.96 | |
| 4 | Ayako Doi (JPN) | 59.81 | |
| 5 | Yuko Nakanishi (JPN) | 59.96 | |
| 6 | Shin Hae-in (KOR) | 1:00.01 | |
| 7 | Choi Hye-ra (KOR) | 1:00.55 | |
| 8 | Joscelin Yeo (SIN) | 1:00.65 | |
