= Swimming at the 2006 Asian Games – Women's 50 metre backstroke =

Women's 50 metre backstroke at the 2006 Asian Games
- Venue: Hamad Aquatic Centre
- Date: 4 December 2006
- Competitors: 23 from 15 nations

Medalists
gold medal	Zhao Jing	China
silver medal	Gao Chang	China
bronze medal	Reiko Nakamura	Japan

The women's 50m backstroke swimming event at the 2006 Asian Games was held on December 4, 2006, at the Hamad Aquatic Centre in Doha, Qatar.

== Schedule ==
All times are Arabia Standard Time (UTC+03:00)

Date	Time	Event
Monday, 4 December 2006	10:00	Heats
Monday, 4 December 2006	18:00	Final

== Records ==
Prior to this competition, the existing world, Asian and Games records were as follows.

World Record	Janine Pietsch (GER)	28.19	Berlin, Germany	25 May 2005
Asian Record	Zhao Jing (CHN)	28.50	Singapore	10 March 2006
Games Record	Reiko Nakamura (JPN)	29.65	Doha, Qatar	2 December 2006

== Results ==
=== Heats ===
Rank	Heat	Athlete	Time	Notes
1	3	Mai Nakamura (JPN)	28.94	GR
2	2	Zhao Jing (CHN)	29.18	
3	3	Gao Chang (CHN)	29.20	
4	3	Tao Li (SIN)	29.40	
5	2	Lee Nam-eun (KOR)	29.44	
6	1	Reiko Nakamura (JPN)	29.49	
7	1	Sherry Tsai (HKG)	29.55	
8	1	Jung Yoo-jin (KOR)	29.79	
9	2	Lynette Ng (SIN)	30.31	
10	3	Cheung Ho Yi (HKG)	31.14	
11	3	Lin Man-hsu (TPE)	31.38	
12	2	Chui Lai Kwan (MAS)	31.46	
13	3	Wenika Kaewchaiwong (THA)	31.49	
14	1	Kuan Weng I (MAC)	32.08	
15	2	Olga Gnedovskaya (UZB)	32.28	
16	1	Mireille Hakimeh (SYR)	32.61	
17	1	He Hsu-jung (TPE)	32.79	
18	3	Yulduz Kuchkarova (UZB)	33.40	
19	2	Kiran Khan (PAK)	33.49	
20	2	Fong Man Wai (MAC)	34.01	
21	1	Jennifer Kabalan (LIB)	35.18	
22	3	Nora Al-Awam (QAT)	35.65	
23	2	Soulamngeun Khetla (LAO)	42.73	

=== Final ===
Rank	Athlete	Time	Notes
1st place, gold medalist(s)	Zhao Jing (CHN)	28.69	GR
2nd place, silver medalist(s)	Gao Chang (CHN)	28.88	
3rd place, bronze medalist(s)	Reiko Nakamura (JPN)	28.89	
4	Mai Nakamura (JPN)	28.90	
5	Lee Nam-eun (KOR)	29.12	
6	Tao Li (SIN)	29.20	
7	Jung Yoo-jin (KOR)	29.68	
8	Sherry Tsai (HKG)	29.97	
