= List of Uzbekistani records in swimming =

The Uzbekistani records in swimming are the fastest ever performances of swimmers from Uzbekistan, which are recognised and ratified by the Uzbekistan Swimming Federation.

All records were set in finals unless noted otherwise.

== Long Course (50 m) ==
=== Men ===
Event	Time		Name	Club	Date	Meet	Location	Ref
50 m freestyle	22.51		Khurshidjon Tursunov	Uzbekistan	15 August 2022	Islamic Solidarity Games	Konya, Turkey	
100 m freestyle	49.35	h	Aleksey Tarasenko	Uzbekistan	21 June 2022	World Championships	Budapest, Hungary	
200 m freestyle	1:48.84		Ilia Sibirtsev	University of Louisville	16 May 2024	Indy May Cup	Indianapolis, United States	
400 m freestyle	3:48.26		Ilia Sibirtsev	Uzbekistan	17 May 2025	Mel Zajac Jr. International Meet	Vancouver, Canada	
800 m freestyle	7:50.05		Ilia Sibirtsev	Uzbekistan	21 June 2024	Mel Zajac Jr. International Meet	Vancouver, Canada	
1500 m freestyle	15:05.51		Ilia Sibirtsev	Uzbekistan	3 December 2025	U.S. Open	Austin, United States	
50 m backstroke	25.97	h	Danil Bugakov	Uzbekistan	1 August 2009	World Championships	Rome, Italy	
100 m backstroke	56.59	h	Danil Bugakov	Uzbekistan	10 August 2008	Olympic Games	Beijing, China	
200 m backstroke	2:00.32	h	Danil Bukin	Uzbekistan	30 June 2016	Hungarian Championships	Budapest, Hungary	
50m breaststroke	27.39	h	Vladislav Mustafin	Uzbekistan	5 October 2019	World Cup	Budapest, Hungary	
100m breaststroke	1:00.61	h	Vladislav Mustafin	Uzbekistan	24 January 2016	Flanders Speedo Cup	Antwerp, Belgium	
200m breaststroke	2:14.20	sf	Vladislav Mustafin	Uzbekistan	19 April 2015	Russian Championships	Moscow, Russia	
50m butterfly	23.31	sf	Eldorbek Usmonov	Uzbekistan	17 July 2025	World University Games	Berlin, Germany	
100m butterfly	51.84		Eldorbek Usmonov	Uzbekistan	22 July 2025	World University Games	Berlin, Germany	
200m butterfly	2:01.07		Artyom Kozlyuk	Uzbekistan	3 June 2017	III. Meeting Internazionale Tiro a Volo Nuoto	Rome, Italy	
200m individual medley	2:02.50		Aleksey Derlyugov	Uzbekistan	4 May 2014	Belarusian Championships	Brest, Belarus	
400m individual medley	4:25.96		Aleksey Derlyugov	Uzbekistan	24 January 2016	Flanders Speedo Cup	Antwerp, Belgium	
400m individual medley	4:25.53	'#'	Egor Petryakov	Uzbekistan	27 February 2024	Asian Age Group Championships	New Clark City, Philippines	
4×100m freestyle relay	3:22.25		Aleksey Tarasenko (50.00); Eldorbek Usmonov (52.03); Oybekjon Khujaev (51.81); Khurshidjon Tursunov (48.41)	Uzbekistan	13 August 2022	Islamic Solidarity Games	Konya, Turkey	
4×200m freestyle relay	7:30.36		Petr Romashkin (1:52.53); Sobitjon Amilov (1:56.27); Daniil Tulupov (1:50.50); Danil Bugakov (1:51.06)	Uzbekistan	26 November 2009	Asian Championships	Foshan, China	
4×100m medley relay	3:40.43		Aleksey Tarasenko (57.69); Vladislav Mustafin (1:01.00); Eldorbek Usmonov (53.12); Khurshidjon Tursunov (48.62)	Uzbekistan	17 August 2022	Islamic Solidarity Games	Konya, Turkey	

Legend: # – Record awaiting ratification by Uzbekistan Swimming Federation; WR – World record; AS – Asian record; e – equalled existing record;
Records not set in finals: h – heat; sf – semifinal; r – relay 1st leg; rh – relay heat 1st leg; b – B final; † – en route to final mark; so – swim-off; tt – time trial

=== Women ===
Event	Time		Name	Club	Date	Meet	Location	Ref
50m freestyle	26.47	h	Natalya Kritinina	Uzbekistan	27 July 2019	World Championships	Gwangju, South Korea	
50m freestyle	26.24	'#'	Natalya Kritinina	-	-	Uzbekistan Open Cup	Tashkent, Uzbekistan	
100m freestyle	58.35	h	Yulduz Kuchkarova	Clovis Swim Club	19 January 2020	TYR Pro Swim Series	Knoxville, United States	
200m freestyle	2:00.94	sf	Ranohon Amanova	Uzbekistan	20 April 2012	Russian Championships	Moscow, Russia	
400m freestyle	4:15.88		Ranohon Amanova	Uzbekistan	17 April 2012	Russian Championships	Moscow, Russia	
800m freestyle	9:16.13	†	Anastasiya Zelinskaya	Uzbekistan	27 February 2024	Asian Age Group Championships	New Clark City, Philippines	
1500m freestyle	17:38.53		Anastasiya Zelinskaya	Uzbekistan	27 February 2024	Asian Age Group Championships	New Clark City, Philippines	
50m backstroke	29.23	tt	Yulduz Kuchkarova	University Of Kansas	3 December 2015	US Winter National Championships	Federal Way, United States	
100m backstroke	1:01.69	h	Yulduz Kuchkarova	University Of Kansas	4 December 2015	US Winter National Championships	Federal Way, United States	
200m backstroke	2:14.18	b	Yulduz Kuchkarova	Redlands Swim Team	14 January 2012	Austin Grand Prix	Austin, United States	
50m breaststroke	32.67	h	Bibigul Menlibaeva	-	23 February 2018	Uzbekistan Open Championships	Tashkent, Uzbekistan	
100m breaststroke	1:12.45		Fotimakhon Amilova	Uzbekistan	11 September 2016	Paralympics Games	Rio de Janeiro, Brazil	
200m breaststroke	2:37.68		Fotimakhon Amilova	Uzbekistan	10 September 2017	Asian Age Group Championships	Tashkent, Uzbekistan	
50m butterfly	28.77	h	Irina Shlemova	Uzbekistan	29 July 2005	World Championships	Montreal, Canada	
100m butterfly	1:03.93	h	Irina Shlemova	Uzbekistan	24 July 2005	World Championships	Montreal, Canada	
200m butterfly	2:25.62		Shokhsanamkhon Toshpulatova	Uzbekistan	11 September 2017	Asian Age Group Championships	Tashkent, Uzbekistan	
200m individual medley	2:12.53		Ranohon Amanova	Uzbekistan	24 January 2016	Flanders Speedo Cup	Antwerp, Belgium	
400m individual medley	4:40.71		Ranohon Amanova	Uzbekistan	23 January 2016	Flanders Speedo Cup	Antwerp, Belgium	
4×100m freestyle relay	4:01.18		Maftuna Tukhtasionva (1:00.34); Afiya Gimaeva (1:01.77); Yulduz Kuchkarova (59.40); Ranohon Amanova (59.67)	Uzbekistan	26 November 2009	Asian Championships	Foshan, China	
4×200m freestyle relay	8:44.12		Maftuna Tukhtasionva (2:09.43); Yulduz Kuchkarova (2:11.16); Afiya Gimaeva (2:17.82); Ranohon Amanova (2:05.71)	Uzbekistan	25 November 2009	Asian Championships	Foshan, China	
4×100m medley relay	4:26.34		Maftunabonu Tuhtasinova (1:07.18); Fotima Amilova (1:12.90); Shokhsanam Toshpulatova (1:05.21); Alyona Tomina (1:01.05)	Uzbekistan	10 September 2017	Asian Age Group Championships	Tashkent, Uzbekistan	

Legend: # – Record awaiting ratification by Uzbekistan Swimming Federation; WR – World record; AS – Asian record; e – equalled existing record;
Records not set in finals: h – heat; sf – semifinal; r – relay 1st leg; rh – relay heat 1st leg; b – B final; † – en route to final mark; so – swim-off; tt – time trial

=== Mixed relay ===
Event	Time	Name	Club	Date	Meet	Location	Ref
4×50 m freestyle relay							
4×100 m freestyle relay	3:41.73	Natalya Kritinina; Alyona Vasileva; Mukhamedjan Abdijalilov; Khurshidjon Tursunov	Uzbekistan	25 September 2019	Asian Age Group Championships	Bangalore, India	
4×50 m medley relay							
4×100 m medley relay	4:04.70	Parizod Abdukarimova (1:08.38); Muhammadismail Rahmonov (1:04.50); Eldorbek Usmonov (52.09); Osiyokhon Redjapova (59.73)	Uzbekistan	10 November 2025	Islamic Solidarity Games	Riyadh, Saudi Arabia	

Legend: # – Record awaiting ratification by Uzbekistan Swimming Federation; WR – World record; AS – Asian record; e – equalled existing record;
Records not set in finals: h – heat; so – swim-off

== Short Course (25 m) ==
=== Men ===
Event	Time		Name	Club	Date	Meet	Location	Ref
50 m freestyle	21.59	h	Aleksey Tarasenko	Uzbekistan	16 December 2022	World Championships	Melbourne, Australia	
100 m freestyle	47.82	h	Aleksey Tarasenko	Uzbekistan	14 December 2022	World Championships	Melbourne, Australia	
200 m freestyle	1:46.51		Aleksey Tarasenko	Uzbekistan	24 September 2017	Asian Indoor and Martial Arts Games	Ashgabat, Turkmenistan	
400 m freestyle	3:44.07		Ilia Sibirtsev	Uzbekistan	16 October 2026	World Cup	Astana, Kazakhstan	
800 m freestyle	7:38.45		Ilia Sibirtsev	Uzbekistan	17 October 2026	World Cup	Astana, Kazakhstan	
1500 m freestyle	14:43.97		Ilia Sibirtsev	Uzbekistan	15 October 2026	World Cup	Astana, Kazakhstan	
50 m backstroke	24.64	h	Mikhail Kelshko	Uzbekistan	12 December 2024	World Championships	Budapest, Hungary	
100 m backstroke	54.84	h	Mikhail Kelshko	Uzbekistan	10 December 2024	World Championships	Budapest, Hungary	
200 m backstroke	1:58.28	h	Sergey Pankov	Uzbekistan	19 December 2010	World Championships	Dubai, United Arab Emirates	
50m breaststroke	27.45	h	Vladislav Mustafin	Uzbekistan	6 December 2014	World Championships	Doha, Qatar	
100m breaststroke	59.78	h	Vladislav Mustafin	Uzbekistan	3 December 2014	World Championships	Doha, Qatar	
200m breaststroke	2:09.46	h	Vladislav Mustafin	Uzbekistan	5 December 2014	World Championships	Doha, Qatar	
50m butterfly	23.33	†	Eldorbek Usmonov	Uzbekistan	8 October 2026	World Cup	Tashkent, Uzbekistan	
100m butterfly	51.04		Eldorbek Usmonov	Uzbekistan	8 October 2026	World Cup	Tashkent, Uzbekistan	
200m butterfly	1:59.06	h	Bogdan Pukhnatiy	Krasnodar region	14 December 2020	Russian Championships	Saint Petersburg, Russia	
100m individual medley	54.01		Aleksey Derlyugov	Uzbekistan	6 December 2014	World Championships	Doha, Qatar	
200m individual medley	1:56.53	h	Aleksey Derlyugov	Uzbekistan	5 December 2014	World Championships	Doha, Qatar	
400m individual medley	4:12.71	h	Aleksey Derlyugov	Uzbekistan	4 December 2014	World Championships	Doha, Qatar	
4×50m freestyle relay	1:28.79		Aleksey Tarasenko (22.56); Daniil Bukin (23.09); Artyom Kozlyuk (22.02); Khurshidjon Tursunov (21.12)	Uzbekistan	24 September 2017	Asian Indoor and Martial Arts Games	Ashgabat, Turkmenistan	
4×100m freestyle relay	3:15.96		Aleksey Tarasenko (49.11); Daniil Bukin (50.89); Artyom Kozlyuk (48.88); Khurshidjon Tursunov (47.08)	Uzbekistan	23 September 2017	Asian Indoor and Martial Arts Games	Ashgabat, Turkmenistan	
4×200m freestyle relay								
4×50m medley relay	1:41.55	h	Daniil Bukin (26.37); Aleksey Tarasenko (30.21); Artyom Kozlyuk (23.09); Khurshidjon Tursunov (21.88)	Uzbekistan	22 September 2017	Asian Indoor and Martial Arts Games	Ashgabat, Turkmenistan	
4×100m medley relay	3:38.16	h	Daniil Bukin (55.37); Vladislav Mustafin (1:00.15); Aleksey Derlyugov (53.39); Khurshidjon Tursunov (49.25)	Uzbekistan	7 December 2014	World Championships	Doha, Qatar	

Legend: # – Record awaiting ratification by Uzbekistan Swimming Federation; WR – World record; AS – Asian record; e – equalled existing record;
Records not set in finals: h – heat; sf – semifinal; r – relay 1st leg; rh – relay heat 1st leg; b – B final; † – en route to final mark; so – swim-off; tt – time trial

=== Women ===
Event	Time		Name	Club	Date	Meet	Location	Ref
50 m freestyle	26.93	h	Irina Shlemova	Uzbekistan	8 April 2006	World Championships	Shanghai, China	
100 m freestyle	57.16		Yulduz Kuchkarova	Uzbekistan	19 January 2017	William Jewell Meet Kansas vs. Morningside	Liberty, United States	
200 m freestyle	1:59.01		Ranohon Amanova	Uzbekistan	17 December 2011	Vladimir Salnikov's Cup	Saint Petersburg, Russia	
400 m freestyle	4:13.48		Ranohon Amanova	Uzbekistan	18 December 2011	Vladimir Salnikov's Cup	Saint Petersburg, Russia	
800 m freestyle	8:38.36		Ranohon Amanova	Uzbekistan	20 October 2013	World Cup	Doha, Qatar	
1500 m freestyle	17:31.49		Anastasiya Zelinskaya	Uzbekistan	21 December 2024	Vladimir Salnikov Cup	Saint Petersburg, Russia	
50 m backstroke	28.68	h	Yulduz Kuchkarova	Uzbekistan	18 December 2010	World Championships	Dubai, United Arab Emirates	
100 m backstroke	1:00.98	h	Ranohon Amanova	Uzbekistan	3 December 2014	World Championships	Doha, Qatar	
200 m backstroke	2:11.14	h	Ranohon Amanova	Uzbekistan	14 December 2012	World Championships	Istanbul, Turkey	
50 m breaststroke	34.11	h	Anastasiya Korolyova	Uzbekistan	16 March 2000	World Championships	Athens, Greece	
100 m breaststroke	1:15.31	h	Anastasiya Korolyova	Uzbekistan	18 March 2000	World Championships	Athens, Greece	
200 m breaststroke	2:44.94	h	Anastasiya Korolyova	Uzbekistan	17 March 2000	World Championships	Athens, Greece	
50 m butterfly	29.09	h	Irina Shlemova	Uzbekistan	18 January 2004	World Cup	Berlin, Germany	
100 m butterfly	1:03.87	h	Irina Shlemova	Uzbekistan	8 April 2006	World Championships	Shanghai, China	
200 m butterfly								
100 m individual medley	1:02.07		Ranohon Amanova	Uzbekistan	20 December 2014	Vladimir Salnikov's Cup	Saint Petersburg, Russia	
200 m individual medley	2:12.18	h	Ranohon Amanova	Uzbekistan	6 December 2014	World Championships	Doha, Qatar	
400 m individual medley	4:41.39	h	Ranohon Amanova	Uzbekistan	3 December 2014	World Championships	Doha, Qatar	
4×50 m freestyle relay								
4×100 m freestyle relay								
4×200 m freestyle relay								
4×50 m medley relay								
4×100 m medley relay								

Legend: # – Record awaiting ratification by Uzbekistan Swimming Federation; WR – World record; AS – Asian record; e – equalled existing record;
Records not set in finals: h – heat; sf – semifinal; r – relay 1st leg; rh – relay heat 1st leg; b – B final; † – en route to final mark; so – swim-off; tt – time trial
