= Swimming at the 2006 Asian Games – Women's 100 metre backstroke =

Women's 100 metre backstroke at the 2006 Asian Games
- Venue: Hamad Aquatic Centre
- Date: 6 December 2006
- Competitors: 19 from 13 nations

Medalists
gold medal	Reiko Nakamura	Japan
silver medal	Xu Tianlongzi	China
bronze medal	Zhao Jing	China

The women's 100m backstroke swimming event at the 2006 Asian Games was held on December 6, 2006, at the Hamad Aquatic Centre in Doha, Qatar.

== Schedule ==
All times are Arabia Standard Time (UTC+03:00)

Date	Time	Event
Wednesday, 6 December 2006	10:56	Heats
Wednesday, 6 December 2006	18:44	Final

== Records ==
Prior to this competition, the existing world, Asian and Games records were as follows.

World Record	Natalie Coughlin (USA)	59.58	Fort Lauderdale, United States	13 August 2002
Asian Record	He Cihong (CHN)	1:00.16	Rome, Italy	10 September 1994
Games Record	He Cihong (CHN)	1:00.71	Hiroshima, Japan	5 October 1994

== Results ==
Legend

- DNS — Did not start

=== Heats ===
Rank	Heat	Athlete	Time	Notes
1	3	Reiko Nakamura (JPN)	1:00.83	
2	1	Xu Tianlongzi (CHN)	1:02.23	
3	2	Zhao Jing (CHN)	1:02.34	
4	3	Jung Yoo-jin (KOR)	1:02.72	
5	2	Lee Nam-eun (KOR)	1:02.79	
6	3	Takami Igarashi (JPN)	1:03.03	
7	1	Sherry Tsai (HKG)	1:04.10	
8	2	Cheung Ho Yi (HKG)	1:05.60	
9	2	Lin Man-hsu (TPE)	1:05.71	
10	1	Lynette Ng (SIN)	1:06.81	
11	3	He Hsu-jung (TPE)	1:07.35	
12	3	Wenika Kaewchaiwong (THA)	1:07.53	
13	1	Chui Lai Kwan (MAS)	1:08.12	
14	2	Kuan Weng I (MAC)	1:09.44	
15	1	Mireille Hakimeh (SYR)	1:10.82	
16	1	Fong Man Wai (MAC)	1:11.09	
17	2	Olga Gnedovskaya (UZB)	1:11.32	
18	3	Kiran Khan (PAK)	1:16.27	
—	3	Nora Al-Awam (QAT)	DNS	

=== Final ===
Rank	Athlete	Time	Notes
1st place, gold medalist(s)	Reiko Nakamura (JPN)	1:00.82	
2nd place, silver medalist(s)	Xu Tianlongzi (CHN)	1:01.22	
3rd place, bronze medalist(s)	Zhao Jing (CHN)	1:01.72	
4	Lee Nam-eun (KOR)	1:02.35	
5	Jung Yoo-jin (KOR)	1:02.70	
6	Takami Igarashi (JPN)	1:03.06	
7	Sherry Tsai (HKG)	1:03.85	
8	Cheung Ho Yi (HKG)	1:05.01	
