= Swimming at the 2010 Asian Games – Women's 50 metre backstroke =

Women's 50 metre backstroke at the 2010 Asian Games
- Venue: Aoti Aquatics Centre
- Date: 15 November 2010
- Competitors: 21 from 16 nations

Medalists
gold medal	Gao Chang	China
silver medal	Aya Terakawa	Japan
bronze medal	Xu Tianlongzi	China

The women's 50 metre backstroke event at the 2010 Asian Games took place on 15 November 2010 at Guangzhou Aoti Aquatics Centre.

There were 21 competitors from 16 countries who took part in this event. Three heats were held, the heat in which a swimmer competed did not formally matter for advancement, as the swimmers with the top eight times from the entire field qualified for the finals.

Gao Chang and Xu Tianlongzi from China won the gold and bronze medal respectively, Japanese swimmer Aya Terakawa won the silver medal.

== Schedule ==
All times are China Standard Time (UTC+08:00)

Date	Time	Event
Monday, 15 November 2010	09:00	Heats
Monday, 15 November 2010	18:00	Final

== Records ==
Prior to this competition, the existing world, Asian and Games records were as follows.

World Record	Zhao Jing (CHN)	27.06	Rome, Italy	30 July 2009
Asian Record	Zhao Jing (CHN)	27.06	Rome, Italy	30 July 2009
Games Record	Zhao Jing (CHN)	28.69	Doha, Qatar	4 December 2006

== Results ==
=== Heats ===
Rank	Heat	Athlete	Time	Notes
1	1	Xu Tianlongzi (CHN)	28.17	GR
2	3	Gao Chang (CHN)	28.33	
3	2	Aya Terakawa (JPN)	28.47	
4	2	Shiho Sakai (JPN)	28.62	
5	3	Tao Li (SIN)	28.91	
6	3	Shana Lim (SIN)	29.14	
7	1	Claudia Lau (HKG)	29.53	
8	2	Lee Joo-hyung (KOR)	29.55	
9	3	Yulduz Kuchkarova (UZB)	30.03	
10	2	Chan Kah Yan (MAS)	30.15	
11	1	Yekaterina Rudenko (KAZ)	30.26	
12	2	Ham Chan-mi (KOR)	30.78	
13	3	Chen Ting (TPE)	30.90	
14	1	Natthanan Junkrajang (THA)	31.66	
15	3	Erica Vong (MAC)	32.05	
16	2	Kuan Weng I (MAC)	32.06	
17	1	Nguyễn Thị Kim Tuyến (VIE)	32.88	
18	3	Aishath Sausan (MDV)	35.92	
19	1	Mahfuza Khatun (BAN)	39.84	
20	2	Enegül Meredowa (TKM)	42.82	
21	1	Veomany Siriphone (LAO)	44.49	

=== Final ===
Rank	Athlete	Time	Notes
1st place, gold medalist(s)	Gao Chang (CHN)	27.45	GR
2nd place, silver medalist(s)	Aya Terakawa (JPN)	27.86	
3rd place, bronze medalist(s)	Xu Tianlongzi (CHN)	28.14	
4	Shiho Sakai (JPN)	28.17	
5	Lee Joo-hyung (KOR)	28.80	
6	Tao Li (SIN)	29.12	
7	Shana Lim (SIN)	29.19	
8	Claudia Lau (HKG)	29.33	
