= Swimming at the 2006 Asian Games – Women's 400 metre freestyle =

Women's 400 metre freestyle at the 2006 Asian Games
- Venue: Hamad Aquatic Centre
- Date: 4 December 2006
- Competitors: 17 from 11 nations

Medalists
gold medal	Yang Jieqiao	China
silver medal	Zhu Wenrui	China
bronze medal	Lee Ji-eun	South Korea

The women's 400m freestyle swimming event at the 2006 Asian Games was held on December 4, 2006 at the Hamad Aquatic Centre in Doha, Qatar.

== Schedule ==
All times are Arabia Standard Time (UTC+03:00)

Date	Time	Event
Monday, 4 December 2006	10:19	Heats
Monday, 4 December 2006	18:10	Final

== Records ==
Prior to this competition, the existing world, Asian and Games records were as follows.

World Record	Laure Manaudou (FRA)	4:02.13	Budapest, Hungary	6 August 2006
Asian Record	Chen Yan (CHN)	4:05.00	Shanghai, China	17 October 1997
Games Record	Sachiko Yamada (JPN)	4:07.23	Busan, South Korea	3 October 2002

== Results ==
=== Heats ===
Rank	Heat	Athlete	Time	Notes
1	3	Yang Jieqiao (CHN)	4:15:29	
2	2	Zhu Wenrui (CHN)	4:16:59	
3	2	Haruka Ueda (JPN)	4:18:68	
4	3	Lee Ji-eun (KOR)	4:19:64	
5	1	Yang Chin-kuei (TPE)	4:21:56	
6	2	Carmen Nam (HKG)	4:22:02	
7	1	Quah Ting Wen (SIN)	4:22:72	
8	3	Nimitta Thaveesupsoonthorn (THA)	4:26:74	
9	2	Erica Totten (PHI)	4:27:98	
10	1	Pilin Tachakittiranan (THA)	4:28:43	
11	2	Marichi Gandionco (PHI)	4:28:68	
12	3	Ong Ming Xiu (MAS)	4:29:13	
13	3	Tan Pei Shan (SIN)	4:30:07	
14	1	Ng Ka Man (HKG)	4:33:55	
15	3	Choi Sin Hong (MAC)	4:58:54	
16	1	Fong Man Wai (MAC)	5:00:69	
17	2	Imara Fahim (SRI)	5:10:58	

=== Final ===
Rank	Athlete	Time	Notes
1st place, gold medalist(s)	Yang Jieqiao (CHN)	4:12.75	
2nd place, silver medalist(s)	Zhu Wenrui (CHN)	4:14:45	
3rd place, bronze medalist(s)	Lee Ji-eun (KOR)	4:14.95	
4	Haruka Ueda (JPN)	4:16:62	
5	Yang Chin-kuei (TPE)	4:17.15	
6	Carmen Nam (HKG)	4:20:76	
7	Quah Ting Wen (SIN)	4:21:00	
8	Nimitta Thaveesupsoonthorn (THA)	4:26:28	
