= Swimming at the 2006 Asian Games – Women's 800 metre freestyle =

Women's 800 metre freestyle at the 2006 Asian Games
- Venue: Hamad Aquatic Centre
- Date: 6 December 2006
- Competitors: 13 from 9 nations

Medalists
| gold medal | Yurie Yano | Japan |
| silver medal | Yang Jieqiao | China |
| bronze medal | Maiko Fujino | Japan |

The women's 800m freestyle swimming event at the 2006 Asian Games was held on December 6, 2006 at the Hamad Aquatic Centre in Doha, Qatar. This was a timed-final event, meaning that each entrant only swam it once, with the fastest 8 entrants swimming in the finals session and the remainder swimming in the preliminary session.

== Schedule ==
All times are Arabia Standard Time (UTC+03:00)

| Date | Time | Event |
|---|---|---|
| Wednesday, 6 December 2006 | 11:06 | Final 1 |
| Wednesday, 6 December 2006 | 19:08 | Final 2 |

== Records ==
Prior to this competition, the existing world, Asian and Games records were as follows.

| World Record | Janet Evans (USA) | 8:16.22 | Tokyo, Japan | 20 August 1989 |
| Asian Record | Sachiko Yamada (JPN) | 8:23.68 | Tokyo, Japan | 23 April 2004 |
| Games Record | Chen Hua (CHN) | 8:25.36 | Busan, South Korea | 5 October 2002 |

== Results ==
| Rank | Heat | Athlete | Time | Notes |
|---|---|---|---|---|
| 1st place, gold medalist(s) | 2 | Yurie Yano (JPN) | 8:29.51 | |
| 2nd place, silver medalist(s) | 2 | Yang Jieqiao (CHN) | 8:38.35 | |
| 3rd place, bronze medalist(s) | 2 | Maiko Fujino (JPN) | 8:42.31 | |
| 4 | 2 | Jung Ji-yeon (KOR) | 8:44.46 | |
| 5 | 2 | Li Mo (CHN) | 8:52.42 | |
| 6 | 2 | Lee Ji-eun (KOR) | 8:53.60 | |
| 7 | 2 | Quah Ting Wen (SIN) | 9:01.01 | |
| 8 | 1 | Carmen Nam (HKG) | 9:03.72 | |
| 9 | 2 | Nimitta Thaveesupsoonthorn (THA) | 9:05.88 | |
| 10 | 1 | Ong Ming Xiu (MAS) | 9:12.26 | |
| 11 | 1 | Marichi Gandionco (PHI) | 9:14.80 | |
| 12 | 1 | Tan Pei Shan (SIN) | 9:21.10 | |
| 13 | 1 | Imara Fahim (SRI) | 10:18.89 | |
