= Swimming at the 2006 Asian Games – Women's 200 metre backstroke =

Women's 200 metre backstroke at the 2006 Asian Games
- Venue: Hamad Aquatic Centre
- Date: 3 December 2006
- Competitors: 16 from 11 nations

Medalists
gold medal	Reiko Nakamura	Japan
silver medal	Zhao Jing	China
bronze medal	Takami Igarashi	Japan

The women's 200m backstroke swimming event at the 2006 Asian Games was held on December 3, 2006 at the Hamad Aquatic Centre in Doha, Qatar.

== Schedule ==
All times are Arabia Standard Time (UTC+03:00)

Date	Time	Event
Sunday, 3 December 2006	10:49	Heats
Sunday, 3 December 2006	18:40	Final

== Records ==
Prior to this competition, the existing world, Asian and Games records were as follows.

World Record	Krisztina Egerszegi (HUN)	2:06.62	Athens, Greece	25 August 1991
Asian Record	He Cihong (CHN)	2:07.40	Rome, Italy	11 September 1994
Games Record	He Cihong (CHN)	2:09.46	Hiroshima, Japan	8 October 1994

== Results ==
=== Heats ===
Rank	Heat	Athlete	Time	Notes
1	1	Bai Anqi (CHN)	2:12.94	
2	1	Takami Igarashi (JPN)	2:13.37	
3	2	Jung Yoo-jin (KOR)	2:13.57	
4	2	Reiko Nakamura (JPN)	2:15.22	
5	2	Zhao Jing (CHN)	2:16.37	
6	1	Lee Nam-eun (KOR)	2:17.97	
7	2	He Hsu-jung (TPE)	2:21.62	
8	2	Cheung Ho Yi (HKG)	2:22.30	
9	1	Ong Ming Xiu (MAS)	2:24.74	
10	1	Maftunabonu Tukhtasinova (UZB)	2:28.38	
11	2	Kuan Weng I (MAC)	2:29.98	
12	2	Wenika Kaewchaiwong (THA)	2:31.33	
13	1	Yulduz Kuchkarova (UZB)	2:33.93	
14	1	Fong Man Wai (MAC)	2:36.66	
15	2	Kiran Khan (PAK)	2:41.09	
16	1	Nora Al-Awam (QAT)	2:51.10	

=== Final ===
Rank	Athlete	Time	Notes
1st place, gold medalist(s)	Reiko Nakamura (JPN)	2:10.33	
2nd place, silver medalist(s)	Zhao Jing (CHN)	2:11.54	
3rd place, bronze medalist(s)	Takami Igarashi (JPN)	2:12.55	
4	Bai Anqi (CHN)	2:12.63	
5	Jung Yoo-jin (KOR)	2:13.00	
6	Lee Nam-eun (KOR)	2:17.85	
7	He Hsu-jung (TPE)	2:21.89	
8	Cheung Ho Yi (HKG)	2:24.56	
