= 2006 FINA World Swimming Championships (25 m) =

8th FINA Short Course Worlds
- Host city: Shanghai, China
- Date: April 5–9, 2006
- Venue: Qizhong Forest Sports City Arena
- Nations: 116

The 8th FINA World Swimming Championships (25 m) swam April 5–9, 2006 at the Qizhong Forest Sports City Arena in Shanghai, China.

== Participating nations ==
A total of 116 nations had entered swimmers at the 2006 Short Course Worlds.

- Algeria
- Angola
- Argentina
- Armenia
- Australia
- Austria
- Azerbaijan
- Bahamas
- Bangladesh
- Barbados
- Belarus
- Belgium
- Bosnia and Herzegovina
- Brazil
- Bulgaria
- Burkina Faso
- Burundi
- Cambodia
- Canada
- Chile
- China
- Colombia
- Comoros
- Congo
- Costa Rica
- Côte d'Ivoire
- Croatia
- Cuba
- Cyprus
- Czech Republic
- Denmark
- Dominican Republic
- Ecuador
- Egypt
- El Salvador
- Estonia
- Fiji
- Finland
- France
- Georgia
- Germany
- Great Britain
- Greece
- Guatemala
- Honduras
- Hong Kong
- Iceland
- India
- Indonesia
- Iran
- Israel
- Italy
- Japan
- Jordan
- Kazakhstan
- Kenya
- Kuwait
- Kyrgyzstan
- Laos
- Latvia
- Lebanon
- Lithuania
- Macau
- Macedonia
- Malaysia
- Maldives
- Mali
- Malta
- Mauritius
- Mexico
- Moldova
- Mongolia
- Morocco
- Namibia
- Nepal
- Netherlands
- New Zealand
- Nicaragua
- Nigeria
- Northern Mariana Islands
- Norway
- Pakistan
- Palau
- Palestine
- Papua New Guinea
- Peru
- Philippines
- Portugal
- Romania
- Russia
- Rwanda
- Samoa
- Senegal
- Serbia and Montenegro
- Seychelles
- Slovakia
- Slovenia
- South Africa
- South Korea
- Spain
- Sri Lanka
- Sweden
- Chinese Taipei
- Thailand
- Tunisia
- Turkey
- Turkmenistan
- Uganda
- Ukraine
- United Arab Emirates
- Uruguay
- United States
- Uzbekistan
- Venezuela
- Vietnam
- Zimbabwe

== Results ==
=== Men ===
Event	Gold		Silver		Bronze	
50 m free	Duje Draganja; Croatia	21.38	Cullen Jones; USA	21.52	Oleksandr Volynets; Ukraine; Nick Brunelli; USA	21.62
100 m free	Ryk Neethling; South Africa	47.24	Filippo Magnini; Italy	47.31	José Meolans; Argentina	47.87
200 m free	Ryk Neethling; South Africa	1:43.51	Filippo Magnini; Italy	1:43.78	Massimiliano Rosolino; Italy	1:44.67
400 m free	Yuri Prilukov; Russia	3:38:08	Taehwan Park; South Korea	3:40.43	Massimiliano Rosolino; Italy	3:41.04
1500 m free	Yuri Prilukov; Russia	14:23.92 CR	Taehwan Park; South Korea	14:33.28	Lin Zhang; China	14:42.82
50 m back	Matt Welsh; Australia	23.53	Thomas Rupprath; Germany	23.70	Helge Meeuw; Germany	24.01
100 m back	Matt Welsh; Australia	51.09	Markus Rogan; Austria	51.48	Randall Bal; USA; Helge Meeuw; Germany	51.63
200 m back	Ryan Lochte; USA	1:49.05 WR	Markus Rogan; Austria	1:50.97	Matt Welsh; Australia	1:53.10
50 m breast	Oleg Lisogor; Ukraine	26.39 CR	Alessandro Terrin; Italy	26.60	Chris Cook; Great Britain	27.17
100 m breast	Oleg Lisogor; Ukraine	58.14 CR	Brenton Rickard; Australia	58.70	Alexander Dale Oen; Norway	59.16
200 m breast	Vlad Polyakov; Kazakhstan	2:06.95	Brenton Rickard; Australia	2:07.52	Yevgeniy Ryzhkov; Kazakhstan	2:07.94
50 m fly	Matt Welsh; Australia	23.05	Sergiy Breus; Ukraine	23.06	Kaio Almeida; Brazil	23.07
100 m fly	Kaio Almeida; Brazil	51.07	Albert Subirats; Venezuela	51.23	Jayme Cramer; USA	51.53
200 m fly	Wu Peng; China	1:52.36 CR	Moss Burmester; New Zealand	1:53.94	Nikolay Skvortsov; Russia	1:54.09
100 m IM	Ryk Neethling; South Africa	52.42 CR	Peter Mankoč; Slovenia	53.00	Stefan Nystrand; Sweden	53.97
200 m IM	Ryan Lochte; USA	1:53.31 WR	Markus Rogan; Austria	1:55.68	Igor Berezutskiy; Russia	1:56.64
400 m IM	Ryan Lochte; USA	4:02.49 CR	Luca Marin; Italy	4:05.12	Igor Berezutskiy; Russia	4:06.81
4 × 100 m Free Relay	Italy; Alessandro Calvi; Klaus Lanzarini; Christian Galenda; Filippo Magnini	3:10.74	Sweden; Marcus Piehl; Lars Frölander; Jonas Tilly; Stefan Nystrand	3:11.63	USA; Nick Brunelli; Ryan Lochte; Matt Grevers; Jason Lezak	3:11.92
4 × 200 m Free Relay	Italy; Massimiliano Rosolino; Matteo Pelliciari; Nicola Cassio; Filippo Magnini	6:59.08; CR	Australia; Andrew Mewing; Louis Paul; Grant Brits; Nic Ffrost	7:04.16	USA; Ryan Lochte; Nick Brunelli; Jayme Cramer; Larsen Jensen	7:04.34
4 × 100 m Medley Relay	Australia; Matt Welsh; Brenton Rickard; Adam Pine; Ashley Callus	3:27.71	USA; Ryan Lochte; Scott Usher; Jayme Cramer; Nick Brunelli	3:28.00	Ukraine; Andriy Oleynyk; Oleg Lisogor; Sergiy Advena; Andriy Serdinov	3:28.62; NR

=== Women ===
Event	Gold		Silver		Bronze	
50 m free	Libby Lenton; Australia	23.97	Therese Alshammar; Sweden	23.98	Marleen Veldhuis; Netherlands	24.25
100 m free	Libby Lenton; Australia	52.33	Marleen Veldhuis; Netherlands	53.33	Maritza Correia; USA	53.54
200 m free	Yang Yu; China	1:54.94	Federica Pellegrini; Italy	1:55.15	Annika Liebs; Germany	1:55.56
400 m free	Kate Ziegler; USA	4:01.79	Bronte Barratt; Australia	4:03.29	Federica Pellegrini; Italy	4:03.63
800 m free	Anastasia Ivanenko; Russia	8:11.99 CR	Kate Ziegler; USA	8:14.12	Rebecca Cooke; Great Britain	8:20.02
50 m back	Janine Pietsch; Germany	27.00 CR	Tayliah Zimmer; Australia	27.25	Gao Chang; China	27.28
100 m back	Janine Pietsch; Germany	58.02 CR	Tayliah Zimmer; Australia	58.27	Gao Chang; China	58.74
200 m back	Margaret Hoelzer; USA	2:05.29	Tayliah Zimmer; Australia	2:05.99	Hannah McLean; New Zealand	2:06.96
50 m breast	Jade Edmistone; Australia	30.22	Brooke Hanson; Australia	30.40	Jessica Hardy; USA	30.48
100 m breast	Tara Kirk; USA	1:05.25 CR	Suzaan van Biljon; South Africa	1:05.62	Jade Edmistone; Australia	1:06.08
200 m breast	Hui Qi; China	2:20.72	Tara Kirk; USA	2:21.77	Nan Luo; China	2:23.49
50 m fly	Therese Alshammar; Sweden	25.76	Fabienne Nadarajah; Austria	25.95	Anna-Karin Kammerling; Sweden	26.07
100 m fly	Libby Lenton; Australia	56.61	Rachel Komisarz; USA	57.43	Jessicah Schipper; Australia	57.49
200 m fly	Jessicah Schipper; Australia	2:05.11 CR	Francesca Segat; Italy	2:05.91	Yu Yang; China	2:07.05
100 m IM	Brooke Hanson; Australia	1:00.16	Hanna-Maria Seppälä; Finland	1:00.74	Martina Moravcová; Slovakia	1:01.41
200 m IM	Hui Qi; China	2:09.33	Kaitlin Sandeno; USA	2:10.79	Lara Carroll; Australia	2:11.77
400 m IM	Hui Qi; China	4:34.28	Alessia Filippi; Italy	4:35.38	Anastasia Ivanenko; Russia	4:35.54
4 × 100 m Free Relay	Netherlands; Inge Dekker; Hinkelien Schreuder; Chantal Groot; Marleen Veldhuis	3:33.32; WR	Australia; Shayne Reese; Sophie Edington; Danni Miatke; Libby Lenton	3:34.95	Sweden; Josefin Lillhage; Therese Alshammar; Anna-Karin Kammerling; Ida Mattsson	3:36.13
4 × 200 m Free Relay	Australia; Bronte Barratt; Jessicah Schipper; Shayne Reese; Libby Lenton	7:46.96	China; Jiaying Pang; Jingzhi Tang; Xu Yanwei; Yu Yang	7:47.07	USA; Kate Ziegler; Rachel Komisarz; Amanda Weir; Kaitlin Sandeno	7:49.16
4 × 100 m Medley Relay	Australia; Tayliah Zimmer; Jade Edmistone; Jessicah Schipper; Libby Lenton	3:51.84; WR	USA; Margaret Hoelzer; Tara Kirk; Rachel Komisarz; Maritza Correia	3:55.65	China; Gao Chang; Nan Luo; Zhou Yafei; Xu Yanwei	3:55.76

== Medal table ==
Rank	Nation	Gold	Silver	Bronze	Total
1	Australia (AUS)	12	9	4	25
2	United States (USA)	6	7	8	21
3	China (CHN)	5	1	6	12
4	South Africa (RSA)	3	1	0	4
5	Russia (RUS)	3	0	4	7
6	Italy (ITA)	2	7	3	12
7	Germany (GER)	2	1	3	6
8	Ukraine (UKR)	2	1	2	5
9	Sweden (SWE)	1	2	3	6
10	Netherlands (NED)	1	1	1	3
11	Brazil (BRA)	1	0	1	2
11	Kazakhstan (KAZ)	1	0	1	2
13	Croatia (CRO)	1	0	0	1
14	Austria (AUT)	0	4	0	4
15	South Korea (KOR)	0	2	0	2
16	New Zealand (NZL)	0	1	1	2
17	Finland (FIN)	0	1	0	1
17	Slovenia (SLO)	0	1	0	1
17	Venezuela (VEN)	0	1	0	1
20	Great Britain (GBR)	0	0	2	2
21	Argentina (ARG)	0	0	1	1
21	Norway (NOR)	0	0	1	1
21	Slovakia (SVK)	0	0	1	1
Totals (23 entries)		40	40	42	122
