= Natalya Kritinina =

Uzbekistani swimmer (born 2001)

Personal information
- Born: 6 January 2001 (age 25) Tashkent

Sport
- Sport: Swimming

Natalya Kritinina (born 6 January 2001) is an Uzbekistani swimmer.

In 2018, she competed in the girls' 50 metre freestyle and girls' 100 metre freestyle events at the Summer Youth Olympics held in Buenos Aires, Argentina. In both events she did not advance to compete in the semi-finals. She also competed in the mixed 4 × 100 metre medley relay event.

She represented Uzbekistan at the 2019 World Aquatics Championships held in Gwangju, South Korea. She competed in the women's 50 metre freestyle and women's 100 metre freestyle events. In both events she did not advance to compete in the semi-finals.

She competed in the women's 50 metre freestyle event at the 2020 Summer Olympics held in Tokyo, Japan.
