= Wang Dan (swimmer) =

Chinese swimmer (born 1984)

Personal information
- Born: January 16, 1984 (age 42) Henan, China

Sport
- Sport: Swimming
Medal record
Representing China
Asian Games
| Gold medal – first place | 2006 Doha | 4x100m freestyle relay |

Wang Dan (born January 16, 1984) is a female Chinese swimmer who competed for Team China at the 2008 Summer Olympics.

== Major achievements ==
- 2001 National Games - 4th 100m free;
- 2003 National Championships - 1st 100m/200m free;
- 2006 Asian Games - 1st 4 × 100 m free relay
