= Jung Seul-ki =

South Korean swimmer (born 1988)

Personal information
- Full name: Jung Seul-ki
- Nationality: South Korea
- Born: 13 July 1988 (age 37) Seoul, South Korea
- Height: 1.75 m (5 ft 9 in)
- Weight: 60 kg (132 lb)

Korean name
- Hangul: 정슬기
- RR: Jeong Seulgi
- MR: Chŏng Sŭlgi

Sport
- Sport: Swimming
- Strokes: Breaststroke
- College team: Yonsei University
Medal record
Women's swimming
Representing South Korea
Pan Pacific Championships
Bronze medal – third place	2006 Victoria	200 m breaststroke
Asian Games
Bronze medal – third place	2006 Doha	200 m breaststroke
Bronze medal – third place	2006 Doha	4×100 m medley
Universiade
Gold medal – first place	2007 Bangkok	200 m breaststroke

Jung Seul-ki (Korean: 정슬기; born July 13, 1988) is a South Korean swimmer, who specialized in breaststroke events. She finished eleventh in the women's 200 m breaststroke at the 2008 Summer Olympics, and has won a career total of four medals (one gold and three bronze) in a major international competition, spanning the 2006 Pan Pacific Championships, the 2006 Asian Games, and the 2007 Summer Universiade. Jung also served as a varsity member of the swimming team at Yonsei University.

Jung made her first South Korean team at the 2006 Asian Games in Doha, Qatar. There, she won two bronze medals each in the 200 m breaststroke, and as a member of the nation's swimming team in the 4×100 m medley. Jung followed up her performance in the following year by winning the women's 200 m breaststroke crown at the 2007 Summer Universiade in Bangkok, Thailand. Jung's new meet record of 2:24.67 also dipped beneath the FINA A-cut (2:28.20) by more than four seconds, which assured her a spot on the South Korean team for Beijing 2008.

After excelling internationally in the 2006 and 2007 season, Jung competed for the South Korean swimming team in a breaststroke double at the 2008 Summer Olympics in Beijing. On the first half of a double, the 100 m breaststroke, Jung charged her way to the runner-up spot behind Italy's Roberta Panara in heat four with a steady 1:09.26, but missed the semifinals by almost a full second with a twenty-third overall placement. In her signature event, the 200 m breaststroke, Jung bounced back from the initial half of her specialty double to successfully grab the eleventh seed for the semifinals (2:25.95), but fell short on a berth for the top eight final by the following morning with a disappointing 2:26.83, matching her prelims position in the process.
