= Luo Nan =

Chinese swimmer (born 1986)

Personal information
- Nationality: Chinese
- Born: 3 November 1986 (age 39) Anshan, Liaoning
- Height: 178 cm (5 ft 10 in)
- Weight: 69 kg (152 lb)

Sport
- Sport: Swimming
- Strokes: Breaststroke
Medal record
World Championships (LC)
Bronze medal – third place	2007 Melbourne	4×100 m medley
World Championships (SC)
Bronze medal – third place	2006 Shanghai	200m breaststroke
Bronze medal – third place	2006 Shanghai	4×100m medley
Asian Games
Gold medal – first place	2006 Doha	4×100m medley
Silver medal – second place	2006 Doha	200m breaststroke

Luo Nan (Chinese: 罗男, born 3 November 1986 in Anshan, Liaoning) is a female Chinese swimmer, who competed for Team China at the 2008 Summer Olympics.

== Major achievements ==
- 2001 National Games - 1st 200m breast/4 × 100 m medley relay;
- 2006 Asian Games - 1st 4 × 100 m medley relay, 2nd 200m breast;
- 2006 National Champions Tournament - 1st 100m breast;
- 2007 World Championships - 3rd 4 × 100 m medley relay, 5th 200m breast
