= Park Na-ri =

South Korean swimmer (born 1988)

Personal information
- Full name: Park Na-ri
- National team: South Korea
- Born: 3 March 1988 (age 38)
- Height: 1.70 m (5 ft 7 in)
- Weight: 54 kg (119 lb)

Sport
- Sport: Swimming
- Strokes: Freestyle, medley
Medal record
Women's swimming
Representing South Korea
Asian Games
Bronze medal – third place	2006 Doha	4×200 m freestyle
Bronze medal – third place	2010 Guangzhou	4×200 m freestyle

Park Na-ri (Korean: 박나리; born March 3, 1988) is a South Korean swimmer, who specialized in freestyle and individual medley events. She won two bronze medals, as a member of the South Korean swimming team, in the 800 m freestyle relay at the 2006 Asian Games in Doha, Qatar, and at the 2010 Asian Games in Guangzhou, China.

Park qualified for the women's 200 m individual medley at the 2004 Summer Olympics in Athens, by attaining a B-standard entry time of 2:20.17. Park challenged five other swimmers on the first heat, including two-time Olympians Marina Mulyayeva of Kazakhstan and Vered Borochovski of Israel. She edged out Iceland's Lára Hrund Bjargardóttir to a third-place sprint by more than six tenths of a second (0.60) with a time of 2:21.48. Park failed to qualify for the semifinals, as she placed twenty-sixth overall in the preliminaries.
