= Xu Tianlongzi =

Chinese swimmer (born 1991)

Medal record

Women's swimming

Representing China

Olympic Games
Bronze medal – third place	2008 Beijing	4×100 m medley

World Championships (LC)
Bronze medal – third place	2007 Melbourne	4x100 m medley

Xu Tianlongzi (simplified Chinese: 徐田龙子; traditional Chinese: 徐田龍子; pinyin: Xú Tiánlóngzǐ; born January 11, 1991) is a Chinese swimmer. A native of Yantai, Shandong, she competed for Team China at the 2008 Summer Olympics.

== Major achievements ==
- 2004 National Championships - 3rd 50 m back;
- 2005 Games of the Commonwealth of Independent States - 1st 50 m/100 m/200 m back;
- 2006 National Champions Tournament - 2nd 200 m back/4 × 100 m medley relay;
- 2006 World Military Swimming Championships - 1st 100 m back;
- 2006 Asian Games - 2nd 100 m back;
- 2007 World Championships - 3rd 4 × 100 m medley relay;
- 2007 World Military Games - 1st 200 m back;
- 2007 National Champions Tournament @ Olympic Qualification - 2nd 100 m/200 m back;
- 2008 National Champions Tournament & Olympic Selective Trials - 2nd 100 m back
