= Olga Gnedovskaya =

Uzbekistani swimmer (born 1989)

Personal information
- Full name: Olga Gnedovskaya
- National team: Uzbekistan
- Born: 15 August 1989 (age 36) Tashkent, Uzbek SSR, Soviet Union
- Height: 1.75 m (5 ft 9 in)
- Weight: 60 kg (132 lb)

Sport
- Sport: Swimming
- Strokes: Backstroke

Olga Gnedovskaya (Russian: Ольга Гнедовская; born August 15, 1989) is an Uzbekistani former swimmer, who specialized in backstroke events. Gnedovskaya qualified for the women's 100 m backstroke, as Uzbekistan's youngest swimmer (aged 14), at the 2004 Summer Olympics in Athens. She cleared a FINA B-standard entry time of 1:05.42 from the Russian Championships in Moscow. She challenged seven other swimmers in heat two, including Kazakhstan's Anastassiya Prilepa, who shared the same age with Gnedovskaya. She rounded out the field to last place in 1:15.33, nearly 10 seconds off her entry time. Gnedovskaya failed to advance into the semifinals, as she placed forty-first overall in the preliminaries.

After her competitive career, Gnedovskaya opened a youth swimming center in Tashkent.
