= Yang Yu (swimmer) =

Chinese swimmer

Personal information
- Full name: 杨雨
- Nationality: China
- Born: February 6, 1985 (age 41) Hangzhou, Zhejiang
- Height: 1.75 m (5 ft 9 in)
- Weight: 68 kg (150 lb)

Sport
- Sport: Swimming
- Strokes: Freestyle
- Club: Zhejiang
Medal record
Women's swimming
Representing China
Olympic Games
| Silver medal – second place | 2004 Athens | 4 × 200 m freestyle |
| Silver medal – second place | 2008 Beijing | 4 × 200 m freestyle |
World Championships (LC)
| Gold medal – first place | 2003 Barcelona | 4x100 m medley |
| Gold medal – first place | 2009 Rome | 4x200 m freestyle |
| Silver medal – second place | 2001 Fukuoka | 200 m freestyle |
| Bronze medal – third place | 2003 Barcelona | 200 m freestyle |
| Bronze medal – third place | 2003 Barcelona | 4x200 m freestyle |
| Bronze medal – third place | 2005 Montreal | 200 m freestyle |
| Bronze medal – third place | 2005 Montreal | 4 x 200 m freestyle |
World Championships - Short Course
| Gold medal – first place | 2000 Athens | 200 m freestyle |
| Gold medal – first place | 2002 Moscow | 4x200 m freestyle |
| Gold medal – first place | 2006 Shanghai | 200 m freestyle |
| Silver medal – second place | 2002 Moscow | 200 m freestyle |
| Silver medal – second place | 2002 Moscow | 200 m butterfly |
| Silver medal – second place | 2006 Shanghai | 4x200 m freestyle |
| Bronze medal – third place | 2000 Athens | 4x200 m freestyle |
| Bronze medal – third place | 2002 Moscow | 4x100 m freestyle |
| Bronze medal – third place | 2006 Shanghai | 200 m butterfly |

Yang Yu (simplified Chinese: 杨雨; traditional Chinese: 楊雨; pinyin: Yáng Yǔ; born February 6, 1985, in Hangzhou, Zhejiang) is an Olympic medal-winning swimmer from the People's Republic of China. She became part of the Chinese national swimming team in 1999, and competed for Team China at the 2008 Summer Olympics.

== Career ==
=== International debut and the 2000 Olympics ===
Yang competed in her big international meet in the 2000 World Short Course Championships in Athens, where she won the 200 freestyle in 1:56.06. Later she qualified to swim at the Sydney Olympics, where she placed 17th in the 200 free (2:01.34).

=== 2001, 02 and 03 World Aquatic Championships ===
Yang competed at the 2001 Fukuoka World Championships and won the silver medal in the Women's 200 m Freestyle event (1:58.78), after Australia's Giaan Rooney (1:58.57). At the 2001 Chinese National Games, she placed 2nd in both the 100 (54.94) and 200 free (1:58.71).

In the 2002 World Short Course Championships in Moscow, Yang took gold in the 4x200 free relay (7:46.30, world record), silver in the 200 free (1:55.34, Asian record) and 200 fly (2:06.10), and bronze in the 4x100 free relay (3:36.18). She won gold in the 200 free (1:58.43), 4x100 free relay (3:40.95), 4x200 free relay (7:58.46) and silver in the 100 free (55.51) at the 2002 Asian Games in Busan.

Yang started the 2003 season strongly by posting a world-leading 1:57.70 at the Chinese Nationals in April 2003, but at the 2003 World Championships (Barcelona), she only managed 3rd in this event (1:58.54). She also took bronze in the 4x200 free relay (7:58.53. Yang split 1:57.24, the fastest in history), and gold in the 4x100 medley relay (3:59.89, Asian record and 2nd fastest time in history. Yang swam the freestyle leg and split 53.71).

=== 2004 Olympic Games ===
Yang competed at the 2004 Summer Olympics in Athens. There she was a member of China's 4 × 200 m freestyle relay team, which won the silver medal in 7:55.97 (Asian record), beaten by the USA team who won in the world record of 7:53.42. Yang was also part of China's 4 × 100 m women's freestyle relay team. China reached the final in this event but finished a disappointing 8th.

Yang competed as an individual in the 200m freestyle event, and qualified for the semi-final, but did not progress to the final.

=== 2005-06 ===
Yang did compete at the 2005 World Championships in Montreal, winning the bronze medal in the 200m freestyle event. She posted strong times at the 2005 Chinese National Games, winning the 200 free in 1:57.86, 2nd fastest in the world globally. At the 2006 World Short Course Championships in Shanghai, she took gold in the 200 free (1:54.94). She failed to defend her 200 free title at the Asian Games in Doha, Qatar, beaten by teammate Pang Jiaying (1:59.26 to 2:00.73).

=== 2007 World Aquatic Championships ===
Yang Yu took part in the 2007 World Aquatic Championships in Melbourne. She did not progress beyond the heat stage in the Women's 200 m freestyle, finishing 18th. She was also a member of China's 4 × 200 m freestyle relay (which barely missed the final, placing 9th in the heats) and the 4 × 100 m freestyle relay which ranked seventh.

=== Notable Achievements ===
On January 18, 2004, she broke Susie O'Neill's world record in the women's short course 200 butterfly during a World Cup meet in Berlin, Germany, clocking a time of 2:04.04.

Records
| Preceded by Susie O'Neill | World Record Holder; Women's 200 butterfly (25m); January 18, 2004 – December 13, 2007 | Succeeded by Otylia Jędrzejczak |
