= Lee Ji-eun (swimmer) =

South Korean swimmer

Personal information
- Full name: Lee Ji-eun
- Nationality: South Korea
- Born: 18 June 1989 (age 37) Ulsan, South Korea
- Height: 1.63 m (5 ft 4 in)
- Weight: 54 kg (119 lb)

Sport
- Sport: Swimming
- Strokes: Freestyle
- Club: Ulsan City Hall
Medal record
Women's swimming
Representing South Korea
Asian Games
Bronze medal – third place	2006 Doha	400 m freestyle
Bronze medal – third place	2006 Doha	4×200 m freestyle

- Lee Ji-eun
- Hangul: 이지은
- RR: I Jieun
- MR: I Chiŭn

Lee Ji-eun (Korean: 이지은; born 18 June 1989) is a South Korean swimmer, who specialized in middle-distance freestyle events. She represented her country South Korea at the 2008 Summer Olympics, and has won two bronze medals in both the 400 m freestyle and the 4 × 200 m freestyle relay at the 2006 Asian Games in Doha, Qatar.

Lee competed for the South Korean swimming team in the women's 400 m freestyle at the 2008 Summer Olympics in Beijing. She finished with the fastest final time and a new personal best in 4:19.42 at the Jeju Halla Cup five months earlier in Jeju City, sneaking under the FINA B-standard (4:20.05) by more than half a second. Lee opened up the second heat with an early lead, but faded down the remainder of the race to pick up the fifth spot in 4:21.53. Lee missed a chance to enter the top eight final, as she placed thirty-seventh overall in the prelims.
