= Yulduz Kuchkarova =

Uzbekistani swimmer (born 1994)

Personal information
- Born: January 25, 1994 (age 32) Tashkent, Uzbekistan

Sport
- Sport: Swimming
- Strokes: Backstroke

Yulduz Kuchkarova (born January 25, 1994) is an Uzbekistani swimmer. At the 2012 Summer Olympics, she competed in the Women's 200 metre backstroke, finishing in 37th place overall in the heats, failing to qualify for the semifinals.
