= Hannah Wilson =

Hong Kong swimmer (born 1989)

Hannah Wilson OLY
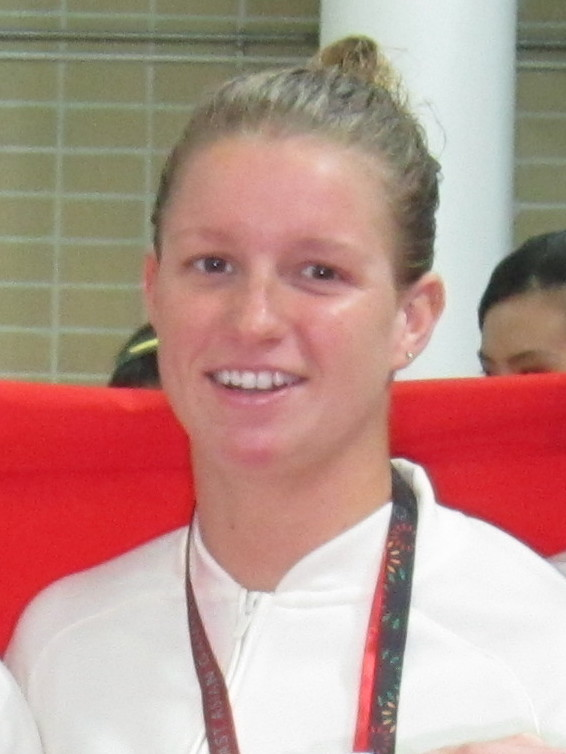
- Hannah Wilson in 2009.

Personal information
- Full name: Hannah Jane Arnett Wilson
- Nickname: Hanz
- National team: Hong Kong
- Born: 10 March 1989 (age 37) Hong Kong
- Height: 1.66 m (5 ft 5 in)
- Weight: 61 kg (134 lb)

Sport
- Sport: Swimming
- Strokes: Butterfly, freestyle
- College team: University of California, Berkeley
Medal record
Women's swimming
Representing Hong Kong
Asian Games
Bronze medal – third place	2006 Doha	4×100 m freestyle
Bronze medal – third place	2010 Guangzhou	4×100 m freestyle
Bronze medal – third place	2010 Guangzhou	4×100 m medley
Summer Universiade
Gold medal – first place	2009 Belgrade	100 m freestyle
Gold medal – first place	2009 Belgrade	100 m butterfly
East Asian Games
Silver medal – second place	2009 Hong Kong	4x100 m freestyle
Silver medal – second place	2009 Hong Kong	4×200 m freestyle
Bronze medal – third place	2009 Hong Kong	50 m freestyle
Bronze medal – third place	2009 Hong Kong	100 m freestyle
Bronze medal – third place	2009 Hong Kong	100 m butterfly
Bronze medal – third place	2009 Hong Kong	4×100 m medley

Hannah Jane Arnett Wilson (Chinese: 韋漢娜; pinyin: Wèi Hànnà; Jyutping: wai^{6} hon^{3} naa^{4}; born 10 March 1989) is a Hong Kong retired amateur swimmer. She is a three-time Olympic swimmer for Hong Kong, having swum at the 2004 Summer Olympics in Athens, 2008 Summer Olympics in Beijing, and 2012 Summer Olympics in London. She has won two career Universiade gold medals. As of July 11, 2009, Wilson currently holds 10 Hong Kong records and two Universiade records in swimming.

However, she struggled but eventually received the International Olympic Committee's permission to race in the 2004 Summer Olympics. Originally the IOC's policy would have barred Wilson from representing Hong Kong (she held a British passport, and being still a minor she could not renounce her British citizenship), which was a cause for distress throughout Hong Kong. She has since renounced her British citizenship to take up Chinese citizenship and a Hong Kong SAR passport in her pursuit to represent Hong Kong in swimming for at least the next decade.

At the 2006 Asian Games, she was a member of the bronze medal-winning team in the women's 4 × 100 m freestyle relay.

She is a graduate of the University of California, Berkeley, after attending Peak School from 1994 to 2000 and Island School from 2000 to 2007. She was recommended to attend the University of California, Berkeley by her 2006 Asian Games bronze medal-winning teammate Tsai Hiu Wai, who was the former swimming captain of the California Golden Bears. Her college teammates include 2008 Summer Olympics 100 m backstroke gold medalist Natalie Coughlin and 4 × 100 m freestyle relay silver medalist Emily Silver. The California Golden Bears are coached by Teri McKeever, the United States assistant coach at the 2004 Summer Olympics.

She retired from competitive swimming following the 2012 Olympics. She now works in Hong Kong, teaching Physical Education at King George V School.

== Academics ==
• A-Level Subjects: Physical Education, Geography, Psychology, (Biology AS)

• Bachelor of Arts in Anthropology

== Collegiate accolades ==
• 2008 All-American (100-yard fly; 200-yard free relay; 400-yard free relay)

• Swam a lifetime best 52.85 in the 100 fly at the 2008 NCAA Championships final to earn All-America honors.

• Was on the NCAA runner-up 200 free relay quartet (1:27.52, a new school record) at the 2008 NCAA Championships.

• Was the third leg of a foursome that set a Cal dual meet record with a 1:32.22 in the 200 free relay (first-place finish) at UCLA (2/2/08).

• Was on the foursome that set a new Pac-10 meet record 3:13.22 in the 400 free relay at the 2008 Pac-10 Championships.

• Also on the quartet that established a new Cal dual meet record in the 400 free relay with a time of 3:16.54 at the Stanford dual meet (2/16/08).

• Clocked personal bests in the 100 free (48.84) and the 50 free (22.57) at the 2008 Pac-10 Championships.

• Her personal marks in the 50 free (22.57) and 100 free (48.84) rank sixth and eighth respectively on Cal's all-time performance charts.

== International accolades ==
- Represented Hong Kong in the Athens 2004, Beijing 2008 and the London 2012 Summer Olympics
- Holds Hong Kong records for the 100 free (55.32); 50 free (26.03) and the 100 fly; 59.35.
- Competed in the 2005 and 2007 World Championships (Montreal and Melbourne, respectively); also competed in the 2006 Pan-Pacific Championships.
- Won the bronze medal in 4 × 100 m freestyle relay at the 2006 Asian Games.
- Won 2 gold medals at the 2009 Universiade World Student Games in 100m Freestyle and 100m Butterfly.
- Her success has led to her become the third most searched name on Yahoo HK.

== 2004 Summer Olympics ==
Wilson was the only person of Caucasian descent on the Hong Kong Olympic squad and made her inaugural Olympics in 2004 at the age of 15.

== 2006 Asian Games ==
Won bronze medal in the women's 4 × 100 m free relay with Tsai Hiu Wai, Lee Leong Kwai and Sze Hang Yu.

== 2008 Summer Olympics ==
Competed in the 2008 Summers in Beijing in the 100 fly and 100 free events ... swam a new Hong Kong record (placed 30th overall) with a 59.35 in the 100m fly heats and recorded a new Hong Kong record in the 100 free with a time of 55.32.

== 2009 Universiade ==
In a first ever for Hong Kong, Wilson won 2 gold medals at the 2009 Summer Universiade World Student Games in Belgrade, Serbia. She won the 100 metres women’s freestyle in 54.35 seconds breaking 2008 Summer Olympics Britta Steffen's Universiade record by 0.01 seconds. The next day after her 100m freestyle success, she won her 100m butterfly semi-final in 58.52 seconds to break 2004 Summer Olympics 200m butterfly gold medalist Otylia Jędrzejczak's Universiade record. A day later she won her second gold medal in the 100 metres women's butterfly in a record time of 58.24 seconds to smash her own record by 0.28 seconds. In the 50m freestyle qualifier she broke the Hong Kong record with a time of 25.99 seconds. In the semi-finals she swam a new Hong Kong record of 25.63 pushing forward the old record time by 0.37 seconds. However, she misses out on the finals after finishing 11th in the semi-finals. She becomes the first HK athlete to win a medal – and a gold at the Universiade.
