= Maki Mita =

Japanese swimmer (born 1983)

Personal information
- Full name: Maki Mita
- Nationality: Japan
- Born: April 22, 1983 (age 43) Yao, Osaka, Japan
- Height: 1.65 m (5 ft 5 in)
- Weight: 58 kg (128 lb)

Sport
- Sport: Swimming
- Strokes: Butterfly, Freestyle
Medal record
Women's swimming
Representing Japan
World Championships (LC)
Bronze medal – third place	2001 Fukuoka	4x200m Freestyle
Pan Pacific Championships
Bronze medal – third place	2002 Yokohama	4×200 m freestyle
Bronze medal – third place	2006 Victoria	4×200 m freestyle

Maki Mita (三田 真希, Mita Maki; born 22 April 1983) is a Japanese former swimmer who competed in the 2000 Summer Olympics and in the 2008 Summer Olympics.
