= Tao Li =

Chinese-born Singaporean swimmer

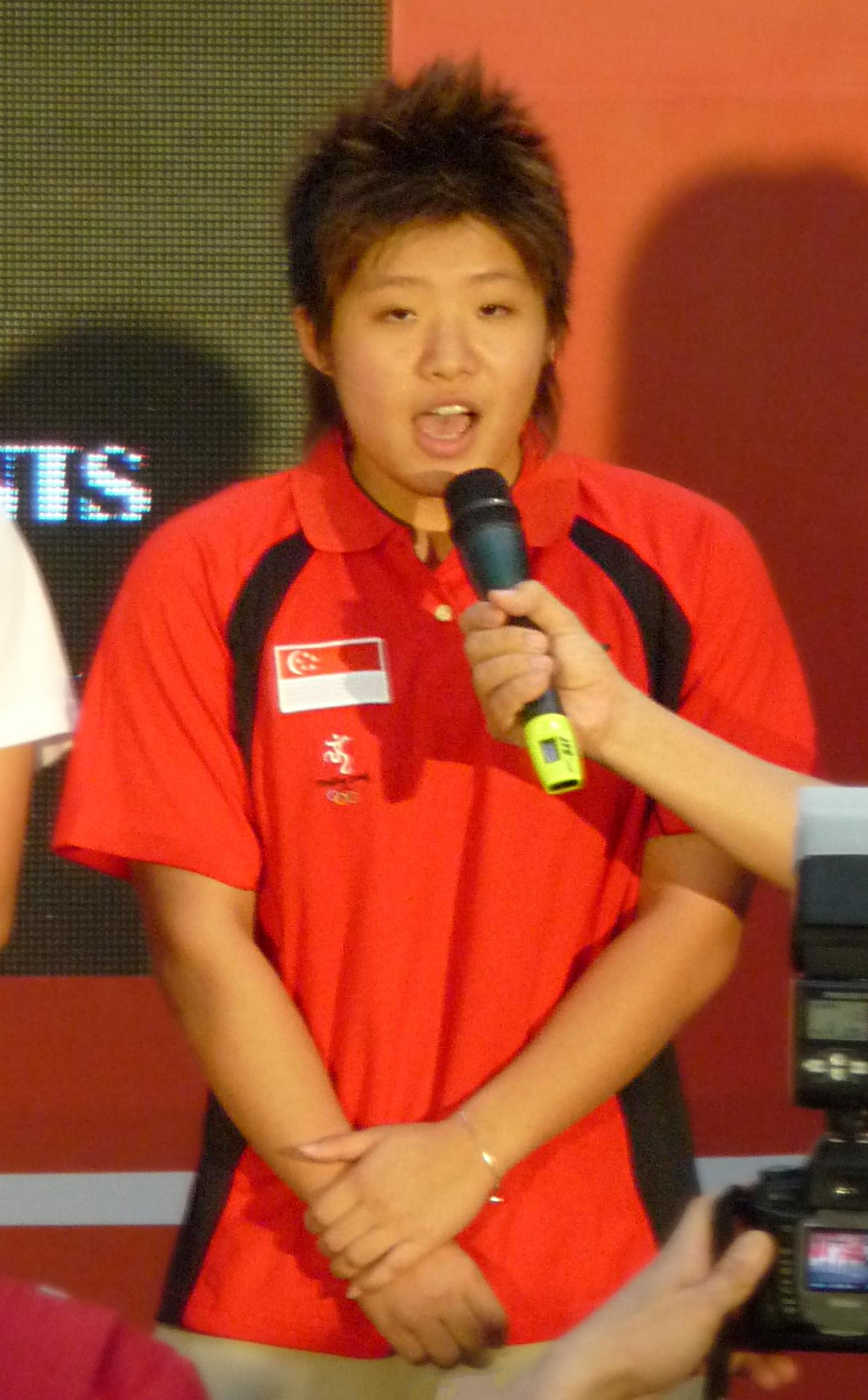
- Tao in 2008

Personal information
- Born: 10 January 1990 (age 36) Wuhan, Hubei, China
- Height: 1.60 m (5 ft 3 in)
- Weight: 58 kg (128 lb) (2006)

Sport
- Country: Singapore
- Sport: Swimming
- Strokes: Backstroke, butterfly stroke
- Club: Swimfast Aquatic Club
- College team: Singapore Sports School
Medal record
Women's swimming
Representing Singapore
Event	1st	2nd	3rd
Asian Games	2	2	2
FINA Swimming World Cup	3	0	0
Asian Championships	0	1	1
Southeast Asian Games	29	1	2
Asian Games
Gold medal – first place	2006 Doha	50 m butterfly
Gold medal – first place	2010 Guangzhou	50 m butterfly
Silver medal – second place	2010 Guangzhou	100 m butterfly
Bronze medal – third place	2006 Doha	100 m butterfly
Silver medal – second place	2014 Incheon	50 m butterfly
Bronze medal – third place	2014 Incheon	100 m butterfly
FINA Swimming World Cup
Gold medal – first place	2008 Singapore	100 m butterfly (short course)
Gold medal – first place	2008 Stockholm	100 m butterfly (short course)
Gold medal – first place	2008 Berlin	100 m butterfly (short course)
Asian Championships
Silver medal – second place	2012 Dubai	50 m butterfly
Bronze medal – third place	2012 Dubai	50 m backstroke
Southeast Asian Games
Gold medal – first place	2005 Manila	100 m backstroke
Gold medal – first place	2005 Manila	200 m backstroke
Gold medal – first place	2005 Manila	200 m butterfly
Gold medal – first place	2005 Manila	4 x 100 m medley relay
Gold medal – first place	2007 Nakhon Ratchasima	100 m backstroke
Gold medal – first place	2007 Nakhon Ratchasima	100 m butterfly
Gold medal – first place	2007 Nakhon Ratchasima	200 m butterfly
Gold medal – first place	2007 Nakhon Ratchasima	4 x 100 m medley relay
Gold medal – first place	2009 Vientiane	100 m backstroke
Gold medal – first place	2009 Vientiane	200 m backstroke
Gold medal – first place	2009 Vientiane	100 m butterfly
Gold medal – first place	2009 Vientiane	200 m butterfly
Gold medal – first place	2009 Vientiane	4 x 100 m medley relay
Gold medal – first place	2011 Palembang	100 m backstroke
Gold medal – first place	2011 Palembang	50 m butterfly
Gold medal – first place	2011 Palembang	100 m butterfly
Gold medal – first place	2011 Palembang	200 m butterfly
Gold medal – first place	2011 Palembang	4 × 100m freestyle relay
Gold medal – first place	2011 Palembang	4 × 200m freestyle relay
Gold medal – first place	2011 Palembang	4 x 100 m medley relay
Gold medal – first place	2013 Naypyidaw	100 m backstroke
Gold medal – first place	2013 Naypyidaw	100 m butterfly
Gold medal – first place	2013 Naypyidaw	4 × 200m freestyle relay
Gold medal – first place	2013 Naypyidaw	4 x 100 m medley relay
Gold medal – first place	2015 Singapore	50 m Backstroke
Gold medal – first place	2015 Singapore	100 m Backstroke
Gold medal – first place	2015 Singapore	50m Butterfly
Gold medal – first place	2015 Singapore	100m Butterfly
Gold medal – first place	2015 Singapore	4 x 100 m medley relay
Silver medal – second place	2007 Nakhon Ratchasima	200 m individual medley
Bronze medal – third place	2005 Manila	100 m butterfly
Bronze medal – third place	2011 Palembang	200 m backstroke
Bronze medal – third place	2013 Naypyidaw	200 m butterfly

Tao Li (Chinese: 陶李; pinyin: Táo Lǐ; born 10 January 1990) is a Singaporean competitive swimmer who specializes in the backstroke and butterfly.

Tao has represented Singapore at the Southeast Asian Games (SEA Games), the Asian Games, World Championship, Commonwealth Games and Olympics. She holds several national records and is the only female Singapore swimmer who qualified for an Olympic final.

At the 2005 SEA Games in the Philippines, at just 15, she won 4 golds and a bronze. She reached the finals of the women's 50 metres, 100 metres and 200 metres butterfly events at the 2006 Commonwealth Games in Melbourne though she did not win any medal. In December 2006, Tao won gold at the 50 metres butterfly in Doha's 2006 Asian Games, beating China's multi-gold medallist Xu Yanwei and breaking her own national record in the process. She was Singapore's most medalled athlete at the 2007 SEA Games in Nakhon Ratchasima (Korat), Thailand, winning four gold medals. Earlier in the year, she became the first Singaporean female swimmer to reach a FINA World Aquatics Championships final, finishing seventh in the 50 metres butterfly.

Tao made her Olympic début for Singapore at the 2008 Summer Olympics in Beijing. She qualified in the 100 metres finals, ranking fourth in the semifinals with a time of 57.54 seconds and setting two Asian records in two days. She thus became the first Singaporean swimmer to qualify in an Olympic final. She emerged fifth at the women's 100 metres butterfly finals with a time of 57.99 seconds.

== Early life and education ==
Tao Li was born on 10 January 1990 in Wuhan, Hubei, in the People's Republic of China, the only child of Tao Ran and his wife Li Yan, who were both former provincial swimmers in their youths, and later took on careers as swim coaches. Her early years were spent in Wuhan, the capital of Hubei province. She began swimming at the age of five, and by the time she was ten, had begun competitive swimming. In her first contest she won two gold medals and broke two age-group records.

In 2002, when Tao was 13, her mother brought her to Singapore, to further her career in swimming. Her father was initially against the idea as she was then training with a provincial swimming team and earning a monthly stipend of RMB 500. And there was a good chance she might do well enough to join the Chinese national team. However, they decided to do so after she was deemed too short for the Chinese National team. Since her parents were not earning much, they faced much difficulty paying for Tao's swim training. Tao's English was not as good as other students her age, she joined a Primary 5 class in Queenstown Primary School though she was three years older than her classmates. She found things tough-going. However, she worked hard and took extra language lessons, and now converses fluently in English.

Tao became a Singapore citizen in August 2005. In 2008, Tao enrolled at the Singapore Sports School. She was expected to continue with her education there until she graduates with a diploma in sports science under an arrangement between the school and the Auckland University of Technology.

She trained with the Sports School's swim coach, Peter Churchill. followed by training at the Aquatic Performance Swim Club (under former Olympian Ang Peng Siong) from 2001. Apparently a contract dispute in 2006 saw her switching her training to another former Olympian, David Lim, at Swimfast Aquatic Club.

In 2016, Tao was studying business management at the Singapore Institute of Management.

== Career ==
=== Swimming ===
Tao has represented Singapore at the Southeast Asian Games (SEA Games) and Asian Games. Following her success at the 1st Hong Kong Open Invitational Championships, she took home four gold medals and was named the most outstanding female swimmer, At the 23rd SEA Games held in the Philippines later that year, she won gold for the 100 metres backstroke, 200 metres butterfly, and 4 x 100 metres medley relay with teammates Ho Shu Yong, Nicolette Teo and Joscelin Yeo.

In March the following year, she won gold in the 50 metres butterfly at the Milo Asia Swimming Championships in Singapore, the Republic's first top award at the competition. Between 16 and 21 March 2006 she took part in the 2006 Commonwealth Games in Melbourne, reaching the finals of the 50 metres, 100 metres and 200 metres butterfly, though she did not gain any medals. In December the same year, Tao won a gold medal at the 50 metres butterfly in Doha's 2006 Asian Games, beating China's multi-gold medallist Xu Yanwei and breaking her own national record in the process. She won a bronze medal at the 100 metres butterfly earlier in the tournament, recording a national and Asian mark of 58.96 seconds.

Tao became the first Singaporean female swimmer to reach a FINA World Aquatics Championships Final. The 2007 World Aquatics Championships were held in Melbourne from 17 March to 1 April 2007, and she finished seventh in the 50 metres butterfly. Later that year at the 2007 SEA Games in Nakhon Ratchasima (Korat), Thailand, she was Singapore's most medalled athlete at the Games, winning four gold medals in the 100 metres backstroke, 100 and 200 metres butterfly, and 4 x 100 metres medley relay. On 28 June 2008, Tao was named Sportswoman of the Year in the Singapore Sports Awards given out by the Singapore National Olympic Council each year. She won the award in 2007. too.

In January 2008, Tao became embroiled in controversy after the Singapore Swimming Association (SSA) introduced a 15% levy on the cash awards given to swimmers, with about 6% set aside for youth development. As part of the government's Multi-Million Dollar Award Programme (MAP), she received S$23,750 for winning three individual titles and one team gold at the 2007 SEA Games. She was therefore "taxed" S$3,562.50, with S$1,425 going to youth development. Unhappy with this, Tao said: "If they [the SSA] want to cultivate youth, they should find their own money, not pay using our awards. It's through our hard work that we got the money. So, I don't see the point that we should give the money to the youths." She itereited that it been her school and not the SSA which had borne the expense of her overseas training. The SSA said it was "very disappointed" with her comments, and pointed out that the association had spent "easily in excess of $20,000" in sending her for competitions abroad such as the World Championships, Hong Kong Open and Japan International, and a stint at the Australian Institute of Sport. SSA Vice-President Oon Jin Gee told the press, "Even with the Sports School funding it, it's our taxpayers' dollars going into her development. It doesn't matter which avenue it comes from, it's still Singapore's support for her."

==== 2008 Summer Olympics ====
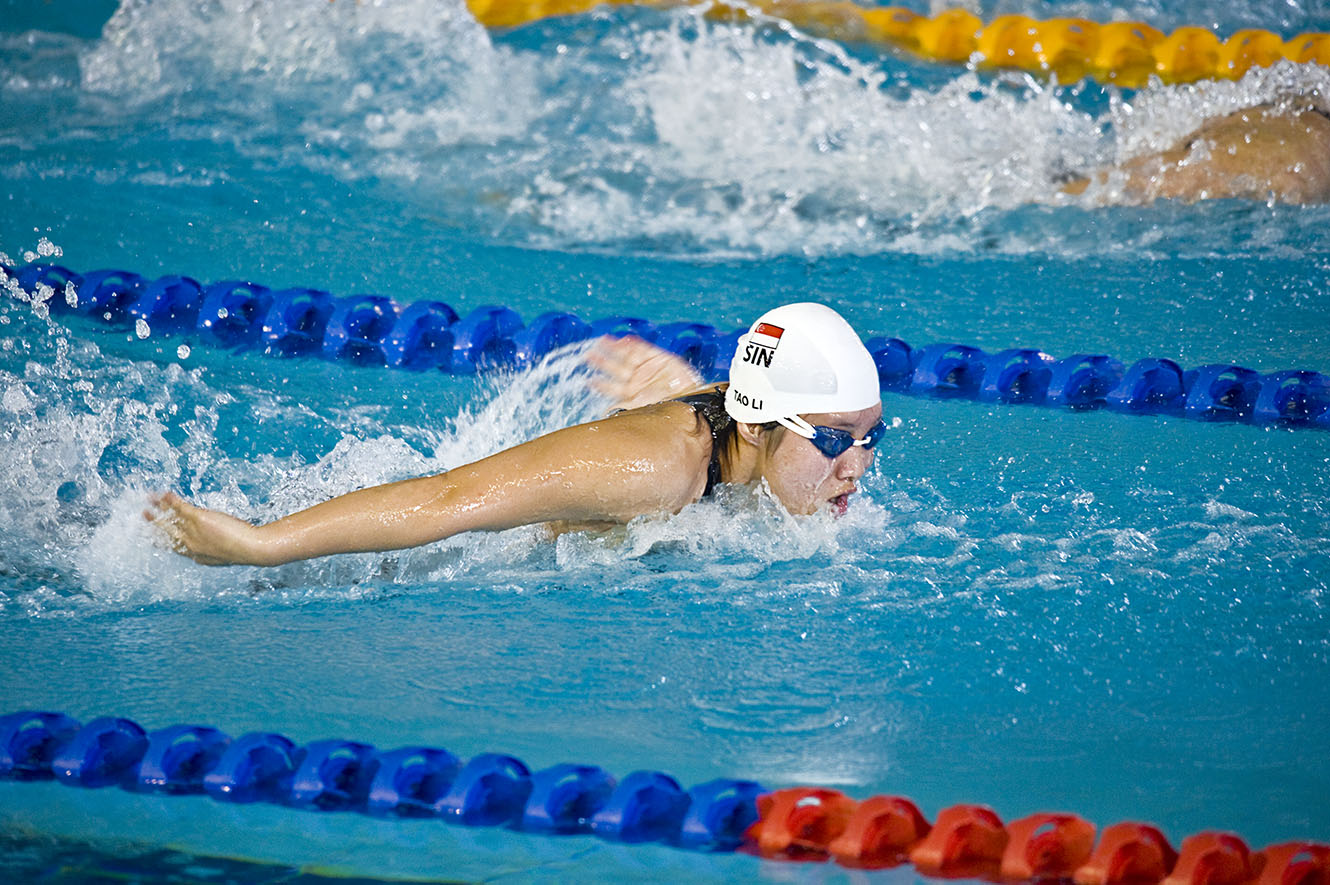
Tao powering her way to gold in the finals of the 100 metres short-course butterfly event on 1 November 2008 at the FINA/Arena Swimming World Cup, held at the Singapore Sports School.

Tao made her Olympic début for Singapore at the 2008 Summer Olympics in Beijing, arriving ranked 26th out of 49 butterfly swimmers. On 9 August, the second day of the swimming competition, she qualified fourth fastest for the semifinals of the 100 metres butterfly after winning her heat with a personal best time of 57.77 seconds. The following day she made it to the finals, shaving off 0.23 seconds for another personal best time and new Asian record of 57.54 seconds. She came in fourth behind her role model, Australian swimmer Lisbeth Trickett, and the USA's Christine Magnuson and Australia's Jessicah Schipper. She thus set two Asian records and the national record for the event, and became the eighth fastest butterfly swimmer in the world and first Singaporean swimmer to qualify for an Olympic Final. On 11 August, she came fifth at the 100 metres butterfly finals with a time of 57.99 seconds. The top three spots were taken by Trickett (56.73 seconds), Magnuson (57.10 seconds) and Schipper (57.25 seconds). Asked by The Straits Times about her performance, Tao said, "If I have given another personal best, it would not have gotten me a medal. The top three winners were just too good. I wanted to do my best and I pushed all the way and hoped for the best." Given Tao's age compared to those of the medallists, there were hopes that she would be able to improve on her performance at the 2012 Summer Olympics in London.

On 12 August, Tao swam in the second heat of the 200 metres butterfly. She finished fifth (26th in a field of 34) and thus did not proceed to the semi-finals, but her time of 2 minutes 12.63 seconds was a new national record. Discussions have begun regarding plans for her future development. The Singapore Sports Council's high performance chief Wayde Clews has said: "Money will not be a prohibitive factor in providing the support and necessary resources for Tao Li to reach her full potential ... with the 2012 Olympics as the target." As Tao needs to gain more high-level competing experience, there is also the issue of whether she should continue training in Singapore or head overseas, particularly to Australia or the US.

==== Events between 2008 and 2012 ====
On 1 November 2008 at the FINA/Arena Swimming World Cup in Singapore, Tao achieved gold in the 100 metres short-course (25 metres) butterfly, and the following evening a bronze in the 50 metres butterfly in a personal-best time of 25.93 seconds. She repeated her feat in the 100 metres butterfly at the Stockholm leg of the competition on 11 November, and in Berlin on 15 November when she set a competition record with a time of 56.28 seconds. Tao was named the inaugural The Straits Times Athlete of the Year 2008, and came second in Today newspaper's 2008 list of athletes of the year.

Tao participated in the 25th Southeast Asian Games in Vientiane, Laos. On 10 December 2009, she took the gold in the 200 metres backstroke in a time of 2 minutes 17.12 seconds. Three days later, she was part of the winning 4 x 100 metres medley relay team with Roanne Ho, Shana Lim and Quah Ting Wen, and on 14 December she broke her own 2005 Games record in the 200 metres butterfly in a time of 2 minutes 13.49 seconds. As she chalked up five wins, including the 100 metres backstroke and butterfly events, these were her most successful Games to date.

On 18 November 2010, Tao won Singapore's first gold medal at the 2010 Asian Games in Guangzhou, China, in the 50 metres butterfly. Her time of 26.10 seconds was a personal best as well as a national record. She had achieved silver in the 100 metres butterfly on 13 November.

==== 2012 Summer Olympics ====
Tao competed for Singapore at the 2012 Summer Olympics in London. In the women's 100 metres butterfly she reached the semifinals held on 28 July, but with a time of 58.18 seconds did not do well enough to join the eight swimmers who advanced to the finals with times below 58 seconds. The next day, in the women's 100 metres backstroke, she bettered her national record with a time of 1 minute 1.6 seconds but did not advance beyond the heats, ranking 26th out of 45 swimmers.

After the 2012 Olympics, Tao decided not to compete for the 2016 Summer Olympics.

=== Tao Li Swimming Club ===
In 2016, Tao launched her swimming academy, Tao Li Swimming Club, at Temasek Club.

== Medals ==
Time (min : s)	Medal	Date	Competition
100 m backstroke
1:02.96 (Games record)	Gold	12 December 2009	25th Southeast Asian Games; Vientiane, Laos
1:03.83	Gold	1 December 2005	23rd Southeast Asian Games; Los Baños, Laguna, Philippines
1:04.05	Gold	9 December 2007	24th Southeast Asian Games; Nakhon Ratchasima (Korat), Thailand
200 m backstroke
2:17:12	Gold	10 December 2009	25th Southeast Asian Games; Vientiane, Laos
50 m butterfly
0:26.10 (personal best, national record)	Gold	18 November 2010	2010 Asian Games; Guangzhou, China
0:26.73	Gold	7 December 2006	2006 Asian Games; Doha, Qatar
0:26.92	Gold	6 March 2006	Milo Asia Swimming Championships; Singapore
50 m butterfly (short course – 25 m)
0:25.70	Bronze	16 November 2008	FINA/Arena Swimming World Cup; Berlin, Germany
0:25.93 (personal best)	Bronze	2 November 2008	FINA/Arena Swimming World Cup; Singapore
100 m butterfly
0:58.24	Silver	13 November 2010	2010 Asian Games; Guangzhou, China
0:58.96	Bronze	2 December 2006	2006 Asian Games; Doha, Qatar
0:59.24 (Games record)	Gold	12 December 2009	25th Southeast Asian Games; Vientiane, Laos
1:00.33	Gold	9 December 2007	24th Southeast Asian Games; Nakhon Ratchasima (Korat), Thailand
1:01.10	Bronze	8 March 2006	Milo Asia Swimming Championships; Singapore
1:01.53	Bronze	1 December 2005	23rd Southeast Asian Games; Los Baños, Laguna, Philippines
100 m butterfly (short course – 25 m)
0:56.28 (competition record)	Gold	15 November 2008	FINA/Arena Swimming World Cup; Berlin, Germany
0:56.85	Gold	1 November 2008	FINA/Arena Swimming World Cup; Singapore
0:56.87	Gold	11 November 2008	FINA/Arena Swimming World Cup; Stockholm, Sweden
0:58.50	Silver	10 November 2008	FINA/Arena Swimming World Cup; Moscow, Russia
200 m butterfly
2:13.49 (Games record)	Gold	14 December 2005	25th Southeast Asian Games; Vientiane, Laos
2:14.11	Gold	3 December 2005	23rd Southeast Asian Games; Los Baños, Laguna, Philippines
2:15.63	Gold	11 December 2007	24th Southeast Asian Games; Nakhon Ratchasima (Korat), Thailand
4 × 100 m medley relay
4:10.38 (Games record)	Gold	13 December 2009	25th Southeast Asian Games; Vientiane, Laos
4:13.18	Gold	11 December 2007	24th Southeast Asian Games; Nakhon Ratchasima (Korat), Thailand
4:14.49	Gold	2 December 2005	23rd Southeast Asian Games; Los Baños, Laguna, Philippines

== National records ==
As of 30 July 2012, Tao was the holder of the following Singapore records:

=== Open ===
Event	Time (min : s)	Date	Competition
100 m backstroke	1:01.60	29 July 2012	30th Summer Olympics; London, United Kingdom
200 m backstroke	2:17.12	10 December 2009	25th Southeast Asian Games; Vientiane, Laos
50 m butterfly	0:26.10	18 November 2010	16th Asian Games; Guangzhou, China
100 m butterfly	0:57.54	10 August 2008	29th Summer Olympics; Beijing, People's Republic of China

Some of the above information was obtained from Singapore national records (long-course metres), Singapore Swimming Association, 1 July 2021.

=== Under 17 years of age ===
Event	Time (min : s)	Date	Competition
200 m backstroke	2:17.55	29 November 2005	23rd Southeast Asian Games; Los Baños, Laguna, Philippines
50 m butterfly	0:26.73	7 December 2006	15th Asian Games; Doha, Qatar
100 m butterfly	0:58.96	2 December 2006	15th Asian Games; Doha, Qatar

The above information was obtained from Singapore national records (long-course metres), Singapore Swimming Association, 1 July 2021.
