= Sherry Tsai =

Hong Kong swimmer (born 1983)

Sherry Tsai OLY
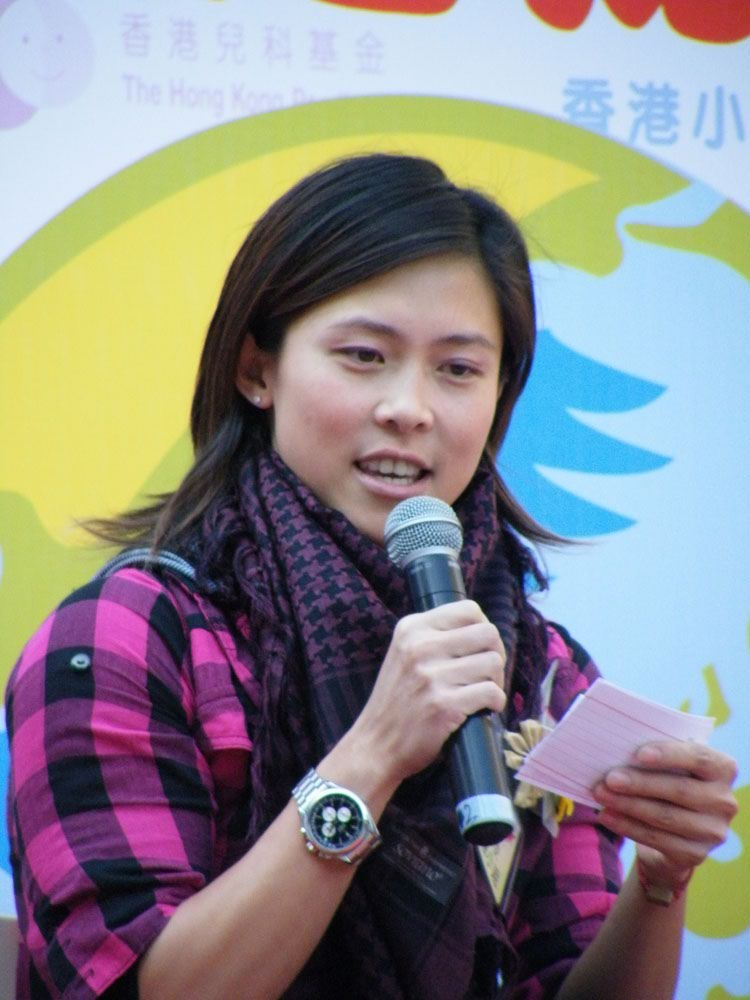
- Sherry Tsai in 2008

Personal information
- Born: 4 September 1983 (age 42) Hong Kong
- Height: 1.65 m (5 ft 5 in)
- Weight: 57 kg (126 lb)

Sport
- Sport: Swimming
- Club: CUC
Medal record
Representing Hong Kong
Asian Games
Bronze medal – third place	2006 Doha	4x100m freestyle relay

Sherry Tsai (Chinese: 蔡曉慧; Jyutping: coi^{3} hiu^{2} wai^{6}; born 4 September 1983) is a retired swimmer from Hong Kong. She competed at the 2000, 2004 and 2008 Olympics in the 50 m freestyle, 100 m and 200 m backstroke, and 200 m individual medley (six events in total), with the best achievement of 28th place. She attended and swam for the University of California, Berkeley in the USA.

She won Hong Kong's Best Swimmer Award 4 years-in-a-row (1998–2001), and at one time held 14 Hong Kong Records. At the 2004 Olympics, she was Hong Kong's flagbearer for the Opening Ceremony.

She has swum for Hong Kong at:

- Olympics: 2000, 2004, 2008
- World Championships: 1998, 2003, 2007, 2009
- Asian Games: 1998, 2002, 2006
- Asian Indoor Games: 2007, 2009
- Asian Swimming Championships: 2009
- East Asian Games: 2001, 2009
- World University Games: 2003, 2005
