= Yang Chin-kuei =

Taiwanese swimmer (born 1987)

Personal information
- Full name: Yang Chin-kuei
- National team: Chinese Taipei
- Born: 30 September 1987 (age 38) Kaohsiung, Taiwan
- Height: 1.63 m (5 ft 4 in)
- Weight: 59 kg (130 lb)

Sport
- Sport: Swimming
- Strokes: Freestyle, butterfly
- College team: National Taiwan University of Physical Education and Sport
- Coach: Liu Chao-lan
Medal record
Women's lifesaving
Representing Chinese Taipei
The World Games
Bronze medal – third place	2009 Kaohsiung	200 m obstacle swim

Yang Chin-kuei (Chinese: 楊金桂; pinyin: Yáng Jīnguì; born 30 September 1987) is a Taiwanese swimmer, who specialized in butterfly and freestyle events. She represented the Chinese Taipei national team in two editions of the Olympic Games (2004 and 2008).

Yang made her own swimming history, as a 16-year-old teen, at the 2004 Summer Olympics in Athens, where she competed in the women's 200 m freestyle. Swimming at the middle lane in heat one, Yang held on with Thailand's Pilin Tachakittiranan throughout the race before fading herself down the stretch to hit the wall in second place and thirty-sixth overall by just 0.36 of a second at a relatively slow 2:05.65.

At the 2008 Summer Olympics in Beijing, Yang extended her swimming program to four events, including the butterfly double. On the first day of the competition, she swam the second heat to third place and forty-third overall in the 100 m butterfly at 1:01.60, edging out Turkey's Iris Rosenberger in a sprint race by close 0.07-second margin. The following day, Yang placed fortieth in the 400 m freestyle, with a time of 4:24.78, and was able to attain her well-improved time of 2:02.84, for a 37th-place finish in the 200 m freestyle. For her final event, 200 m butterfly, Yang swam in the second heat, against six other competitors including Singapore's Tao Li, who placed fifth in the 100 m butterfly final. She finished the race in sixth place by approximately one third of a second (0.33), behind Tao, with a time of 2:13.26. After placing twenty-ninth in the overall rankings of her final event, Yang, however, failed to advance into the later rounds.
