= Nieh Pin-chieh =

Taiwanese swimmer (born 1988)

Personal information
- Full name: Nieh Pin-chieh
- National team: Chinese Taipei
- Born: 12 June 1988 (age 38) Taipei, Taiwan
- Height: 1.65 m (5 ft 5 in)
- Weight: 61 kg (134 lb)

Sport
- Sport: Swimming
- Strokes: Freestyle

Nieh Pin-chieh (Chinese: 聶品潔; pinyin: Niè Pǐnjié; born June 12, 1988) is a Taiwanese swimmer, who specialized in sprint freestyle events. She represented the Chinese Taipei national team in two editions of the Olympic Games (2004 and 2008), competing in a sprint freestyle double.

Nieh made her own swimming history, as a 16-year-old teen, at the 2004 Summer Olympics in Athens, where she competed in the women's 50 m freestyle. Swimming in heat five, she posted a lifetime best of 27.09 seconds to pick up a fourth spot, but trailed behind Puerto Rico's Vanessa García by more than a second. Furthermore, Nieh tied for forty-first overall with Hungary's Zsuzsanna Csobánki in the prelims.

At the 2008 Summer Olympics in Beijing, Nieh qualified for her second Chinese Taipei team in the 100 m freestyle. She attained a FINA-B cut of 57.02 seconds from the National Games in her native Taipei a year earlier. Nieh challenged against five other swimmers in heat two, including three from Southeast Asia. She came only in fifth by nearly five eighths of a second (0.61) behind Christel Simms of the Philippines with a 57.28. Nieh failed to advance into the semifinals, as she placed forty-third out of 49 swimmers in the overall rankings.
