= Xu Yanwei =

Chinese swimmer (born 2003)

Personal information
- Nationality: China
- Born: June 14, 1984 (age 42) Shanghai, China

Sport
- Sport: Swimming
- Strokes: Freestyle
Medal record
Women's swimming
Representing China
Olympic Games
Silver medal – second place	2004 Athens	4x200 m freestyle
World Championships
Bronze medal – third place	2007 Melbourne	4x100 m medley
Bronze medal – third place	2003 Barcelona	4x200 m freestyle
Bronze medal – third place	2001 Fukuoka	4x100 m medley
Short Course Worlds (25m)
Bronze medal – third place	2006 Shanghai	4x100 m medley
Silver medal – second place	2006 Shanghai	4x200 m freestyle
Bronze medal – third place	2002 Moscow	100 m freestyle
Bronze medal – third place	2002 Moscow	200 m freestyle
Bronze medal – third place	2002 Moscow	4x100 m freestyle
Gold medal – first place	2002 Moscow	4x200 m freestyle
Bronze medal – third place	2002 Moscow	4x100 m medley
Summer Universiade
Gold medal – first place	2003 Daegu	4x200 m freestyle
Gold medal – first place	2003 Daegu	4x100 m medley
Silver medal – second place	2003 Daegu	100 m freestyle
Bronze medal – third place	2003 Daegu	4x100 m freestyle

Xu Yanwei (simplified Chinese: 徐妍玮; traditional Chinese: 徐妍瑋; pinyin: Xú Yánwěi; born 14 June 1984 in Shanghai) is an Olympic medal-winning swimmer from China, who became part of the Chinese national swimming team in 2003. She competed at the 2004 Olympic Games in Athens.

She was part of China's 4 × 200 m freestyle relay team, which won the silver medal, beaten by the USA team.

She was also part of China's 4 × 100 m women's freestyle relay team. China reached the final in this event but did not win a medal.

Xu competed as an individual in the 100 m freestyle and 100 m butterfly events, but did not progress past the heat stage in either.
