= Irina Shlemova =

Uzbekistani swimmer (born 1984)

Personal information
- Full name: Irina Shlemova
- National team: Uzbekistan
- Born: 3 March 1984 (age 42) Tashkent, Uzbek SSR, Soviet Union
- Height: 1.69 m (5 ft 7 in)
- Weight: 53 kg (117 lb)

Sport
- Sport: Swimming
- Strokes: Freestyle
- Club: Oltin Suv
- Coach: Daniya Galandinova

Irina Shlemova (Russian: Ирина Шлемова; born 3 March 1984) is an Uzbekistani former swimmer, who specialized in sprint freestyle events. She is a two-time Olympian (2004 and 2008) and a member of Oltin Suv Swimming Club, under the tutelage of her personal coach Daniya Galandinova.

Shlemova made her first Uzbek team at the 2004 Summer Olympics in Athens, where she competed in the women's 100 m freestyle. Swimming in heat two, she picked up a sixth seed and forty-fifth overall by three hundredths of a second (0.030 behind Chinese Taipei's Sung Yi-chieh in 59.21.

At the 2008 Summer Olympics in Beijing, Shlemova qualified for the second time in the women's 100 m freestyle. She cleared a FINA B-standard entry time of 57.13 (100 m freestyle) from the Russian Championships in Saint Petersburg. Shlemova challenged five other swimmers on the same heat as Athens, including 15-year-old Quah Ting Wen of Singapore, and fellow two-time Olympian Nieh Pin-chieh of Chinese Taipei. She rounded out the field to last place by more than a second behind Nieh in 58.77 seconds. Shlemova failed to advance into the semifinals, as she placed forty-sixth overall in the prelims.
