= Pang Jiaying =

Chinese swimmer (born 1985)

Personal information
- Full name: Pang Jiaying
- Nationality: China
- Born: January 6, 1985 (age 41) Shanghai, China
- Height: 1.77 m (5 ft 10 in)
- Weight: 58 kg (128 lb)

Sport
- Sport: Swimming
- Strokes: Freestyle
- Club: Zhejiang
Medal record
Women's swimming
Representing China
Olympic Games
Silver medal – second place	2004 Athens	4×200 m freestyle
Silver medal – second place	2008 Beijing	4×200 m freestyle
Bronze medal – third place	2008 Beijing	4×100 m medley
Bronze medal – third place	2008 Beijing	200 m freestyle
World Championships (LC)
Gold medal – first place	2009 Rome	4×200 m freestyle
Bronze medal – third place	2003 Barcelona	4×200 m freestyle
Bronze medal – third place	2005 Montreal	4×200 m freestyle
Bronze medal – third place	2011 Shanghai	4×200 m freestyle
World Championships (SC)
Gold medal – first place	2010 Dubai	4×200 m freestyle
Silver medal – second place	Shanghai 2006	4×200 m freestyle
Bronze medal – third place	2010 Dubai	4×100 m freestyle
Bronze medal – third place	2012 Istanbul	4×200 m freestyle
Summer Universiade
Gold medal – first place	2003 Daegu	4×200 m freestyle
Gold medal – first place	2003 Daegu	4×100 m medley
Asian Games
Gold medal – first place	2006 Doha	200 m freestyle
Gold medal – first place	2006 Doha	4×100 m freestyle
Gold medal – first place	2006 Doha	4×200 m freestyle
Gold medal – first place	2006 Doha	4×100 m medley
Silver medal – second place	2006 Doha	50 m freestyle
Silver medal – second place	Doha 2006	100 m freestyle

Pang Jiaying (simplified Chinese: 庞佳颖; traditional Chinese: 龐佳穎; pinyin: Páng Jiāyǐng; born January 6, 1985, in Shanghai) is a Chinese freestyle swimmer who competed in the 2004 Summer Olympics, the 2008 Summer Olympics and the 2012 Summer Olympics. Pang is one of the best Chinese women in middle and long-distance freestyle swimming.

She won the silver medal as part of the Chinese 4 × 200 m freestyle relay team in Athens. In the 200 metre freestyle competition she finished seventh and in the 400 metre freestyle event she finished 14th.

In 2008, she won the bronze medal in women's 200m freestyle at the Beijing Olympics. She placed first in the semifinal of the women's 100m freestyle, but was disqualified after a false start. Subsequently, the world-record holder and world champion Libby Trickett was promoted from ninth to eighth and last qualifier into the final, as a result of having the 9th fastest time in the semifinals.

== Major performances ==
- 2003: Barcelona World Swimming Championships: Third, women's 4 × 200 m freestyle relay
- 2004: Shanxi National Swimming Championship: First, women's 100m freestyle, 200m freestyle and 400m freestyle
- 2004: Athens Olympics: Seventh, women's 200m freestyle; second, women's 4 × 200 m freestyle relay
- 2004: World Short Course Swimming Championships: Seventh, women's 200m freestyle
- 2005: National Games: Second, women's 200m freestyle
- 2008: Beijing Olympics: Third, women's 200 m freestyle

== See also ==
- China at the 2012 Summer Olympics - Swimming
