= Hong Kong at the 2006 Asian Games =

- IOC code: HKG
- NOC: Sports Federation and Olympic Committee of Hong Kong, China

in Doha
- Competitors: 281 in 30 sports
- Medals Ranked 15th: Gold 6 Silver 12 Bronze 10 Total 28

Asian Games appearances (overview)
- 1954; 1958; 1962; 1966; 1970; 1974; 1978; 1982; 1986; 1990; 1994; 1998; 2002; 2006; 2010; 2014; 2018; 2022; 2026

Hong Kong participated in the 2006 Asian Games held in Doha, Qatar with a total of 281 athletes (195 men, 86 women) in 30 different sports. It won 6 gold, 12 silver and 10 bronze medals.

== Medals by sport ==
Sports	Gold	Silver	Bronze	Total
Badminton	1	1	0	2
Bodybuilding	1	0	0	1
Cycling	2	0	0	2
Cue sports	0	2	0	2
Fencing	0	0	4	4
Karate	0	0	1	1
Rowing	0	1	0	1
Sailing	1	2	0	3
Squash	0	1	1	2
Swimming	0	0	1	1
Table tennis	1	2	2	5
Triathlon	0	1	0	1
Weightlifting	0	0	1	1
Wushu	0	2	0	2

== Medalists ==
=== Gold ===
- Badminton: women's singles: Wang Chen
- Bodybuilding: men's -75 kg: Chan Yun To
- Cycling: men's road race: Wong Kam Po
- Cycling: men's points race: Cheung King Wai
- Sailing: men's mistral light: Chan King Yin
- Table tennis: men's doubles: Ko Lai Chak / Li Ching

=== Silver ===
- Badminton: women's singles: Yip Pui Yin
- Cue sports: men's snooker doubles: Marco Fu Ka Chun / Chan Wai Ki
- Cue sports: men's snooker team: Fung Kwok Wai / Marco Fu Ka Chun / Chan Wai Ki
- Rowing: women's lightweight single sculls: Lee Ka Man
- Sailing: men's mistral heavy: Ho Chi Ho
- Sailing: women's mistral: Chan Wai Kei
- Squash: women's singles: Chiu Wing Yin
- Table tennis: women's singles: Tie Ya Na
- Table tennis: women's doubles: Tie Ya Na / Zhang Rui
- Triathlon: men's competition: Chi Wo Daniel Lee
- Wushu: men's taijiquan: Hei Zhi Hong
- Wushu: women's nanquan: Angie Tsang

=== Bronze ===
- Fencing: men's foil team: Cheung Kai Tung / Lau Kwok Kin / Kwoon Yat Kevin Ngan / Wong Kam Kau
- Fencing: women's épée team: Yuk Han Bjork Cheng / Cheung Yi Nei / Sabrina Lui / Yeung Chui Ling
- Fencing: women's sabre individual: Chow Tsz Ki
- Fencing: women's sabre team: Au Yeung Wai Sum / Chow Tsz Ki / Pau Ming Wai Akina / Tsui Wan Yi
- Karate: women's kumite -60 kg: Chan Ma Kan
- Squash: women's singles: Mak Pui Hin
- Swimming: women's 4 × 100 m free relay: Hannah Wilson / Tsai Hiu Wai / Lee Leong Kwai / Sze Hang Yu
- Table tennis: men's singles: Li Ching
- Table tennis: men's team: Cheung Yuk / Ko Lai Chak / Li Ching / Leung Chu Yan / Tse Ka Chun
- Weightlifting: women's -53 kg: Yu Wi Li
