= Hamad Aquatic Centre =

Swimming venue in Doha, Qatar

Coordinates: 25°15′49″N 51°26′36″E

- Aquatics Complex
- Interactive map of Hamad Aquatic Centre
- Location: Doha, Qatar
- Capacity: 5,000 (permanent)

Construction
- Groundbreaking: 2004
- Built: 2005

Hamad Aquatic Centre is the largest Aquatic Center in the Middle East, located in Doha, Qatar. The centre is housed in the Doha Sports City complex along with other buildings dedicated to sports in Qatar including the Qatar Olympic and Sports Museum, the Aspire Tower, Khalifa International Stadium, and a training school called Aspire Academy. It is three stories tall and is equipped to host events in swimming, synchronized swimming, and diving. The centre is currently operated by Vortex Aquatics.

== Technical features ==
A main three-story-tall building contains two diving pools as well as two Olympic-size swimming pools and has a seating capacity of over 2,000.

== Notable events ==
- Asian Games: 2006
- FINA Swimming World Cup: 2012, 2013, 2014, 2015, 2016, 2017, 2018, 2019, 2021
- Pan Arab Games: 2011
- West Asian Games: 2005
- World Swimming Championships: 2014

== Recognition ==
In November 2021, ESPN mentioned Hamad Aquatic Centre in a published article noting the diversity of sporting venues and sports culture in Doha.

== Controversy ==
The Centre was the focus of controversy in October 2013. That month, Israeli swimmer Amit Ivry finished 2nd and won a silver medal in the women's 100 meter mixed individual medley at the FINA Swimming World Cup in swimming at the Centre, breaking the Israeli national record at 58.43 seconds. The Israeli flag was removed from outside the Centre at the FINA event, however. Furthermore, after Guy Barnea won a 200-meter butterfly heat, he posted a screenshot of a broadcast to Facebook in which the Israeli flag was displayed without the Star of David. However, subsequent footage of the event released after Barnea's post revealed that the broadcast did not omit the Star of David. The FINA Code of Ethics states that Fédération Internationale de Natation tournaments must have: “no discrimination on the basis of .. race, religion, or political opinion.”
