= Swimming at the 2006 Asian Games – Men's 4 × 100 metre medley relay =

Men's 4 × 100 metre medley relay at the 2006 Asian Games
- Venue: Hamad Aquatic Centre
- Date: 7 December 2006
- Competitors: 64 from 14 nations

Medalists
gold medal	Japan; Junichi Miyashita, Kosuke Kitajima, Takashi Yamamoto, Daisuke Hosokawa
silver medal	China; Ouyang Kunpeng, Lai Zhongjian, Wang Dong, Chen Zuo
bronze medal	South Korea; Sung Min, You Seung-hun, Jeong Doo-hee, Park Tae-hwan

The men's 4 × 100 m medley relay swimming event at the 2006 Asian Games was held on December 7, 2006 at the Hamad Aquatic Centre in Doha, Qatar.

== Schedule ==
All times are Arabia Standard Time (UTC+03:00)

Date	Time	Event
Thursday, 7 December 2006	11:09	Heats
Thursday, 7 December 2006	19:22	Final

== Records ==
Prior to this competition, the existing world, Asian and Games records were as follows.

World Record	United States	3:30.68	Athens, Greece	21 August 2004
Asian Record	Japan	3:35.22	Athens, Greece	21 August 2004
Games Record	Japan	3:37.45	Busan, South Korea	4 October 2002

== Results ==
Legend

- DNS — Did not start
- DSQ — Disqualified

=== Heats ===
Rank	Heat	Team	Time	Notes
1	2	Japan (JPN)	3:41.17	
		Junichi Miyashita	56.99	
		Makoto Yamashita	1:01.60	
		Ryo Takayasu	52.45	
		Takamitsu Kojima	50.13	
2	2	China (CHN)	3:48.06	
		Zhang Bodong	56.21	
		Lai Zhongjian	1:05.58	
		Wang Dong	55.44	
		Huang Shaohua	50.83	
3	1	South Korea (KOR)	3:49.50	
		Lee Seung-hyeon	58.22	
		You Seung-hun	1:04.63	
		Jeong Doo-hee	54.94	
		Lim Nam-gyun	51.71	
4	2	Kazakhstan (KAZ)	3:51.58	
		Oleg Rabota	1:00.22	
		Dmitriy Gordiyenko	1:05.08	
		Rustam Khudiyev	54.65	
		Alexandr Sklyar	51.63	
5	1	Uzbekistan (UZB)	3:51.63	
		Danil Bugakov	59.09	
		Andrey Morkovin	1:04.88	
		Oleg Lyashko	55.27	
		Petr Romashkin	52.39	
6	1	Chinese Taipei (TPE)	3:51.95	
		Yuan Ping	59.36	
		Chiang Hsin-hung	1:03.75	
		Hsu Chi-chieh	55.82	
		Wang Shao-an	53.02	
7	1	Philippines (PHI)	3:53.78	
		Miguel Molina	1:00.87	
		Gerard Bordado	1:04.85	
		James Walsh	55.80	
		Kendrick Uy	52.26	
8	1	Iran (IRI)	3:56.12	
		Shahin Baradaran	1:02.32	
		Mohammad Alirezaei	1:05.46	
		Hamid Reza Mobarrez	56.14	
		Mohammad Bidarian	52.20	
9	2	Hong Kong (HKG)	3:57.22	
		Geoffrey Cheah	58.88	
		Eric Chan	1:08.03	
		David Wong	57.05	
		Harbeth Fu	53.26	
10	2	Macau (MAC)	3:58.80	
		Antonio Tong	1:01.34	
		Ma Chan Wai	1:07.02	
		Victor Wong	55.96	
		Lao Kuan Fong	54.48	
11	1	Kyrgyzstan (KGZ)	4:06.60	
		Iurii Zakharov	1:01.24	
		Denis Ryskal	1:09.17	
		Vasilii Danilov	59.23	
		Rashid Iunusov	56.96	
12	2	Qatar (QAT)	4:06.78	
		Ahmed Salamoun	1:03.42	
		Osama El-Aarag	1:09.03	
		Moyssara El-Aarag	59.35	
		Anas Abu Yousuf	54.98	
—	1	Kuwait (KUW)	DSQ	
		Zainalabdeen Qali	1:03.24	
		Abdulrahman Al-Bader	1:06.97	
		Waleed Al-Qahtani	58.15	
		Mohammad Madwa		
—	2	Palestine (PLE)	DNS	
		—		
		—		
		—		
		—		

=== Final ===
Rank	Team	Time	Notes
1st place, gold medalist(s)	Japan (JPN)	3:36.52	GR
	Junichi Miyashita	54.64	GR
	Kosuke Kitajima	1:00.54	
	Takashi Yamamoto	51.97	
	Daisuke Hosokawa	49.37	
2nd place, silver medalist(s)	China (CHN)	3:40.27	
	Ouyang Kunpeng	55.36	
	Lai Zhongjian	1:02.97	
	Wang Dong	52.91	
	Chen Zuo	49.03	
3rd place, bronze medalist(s)	South Korea (KOR)	3:41.33	
	Sung Min	56.39	
	You Seung-hun	1:03.03	
	Jeong Doo-hee	52.99	
	Park Tae-hwan	48.92	
4	Kazakhstan (KAZ)	3:42.16	
	Stanislav Ossinskiy	57.93	
	Vladislav Polyakov	1:00.34	
	Stanislav Kuzmin	54.19	
	Vitaliy Khan	49.70	
5	Chinese Taipei (TPE)	3:49.76	
	Yuan Ping	59.22	
	Chiang Hsin-hung	1:03.43	
	Hsu Chi-chieh	55.56	
	Wang Shao-an	51.55	
6	Uzbekistan (UZB)	3:51.69	
	Danil Bugakov	58.39	
	Andrey Morkovin	1:05.23	
	Oleg Lyashko	55.59	
	Petr Romashkin	52.48	
7	Philippines (PHI)	3:54.67	
	Ryan Arabejo	1:00.51	
	Gerard Bordado	1:05.98	
	James Walsh	55.62	
	Kendrick Uy	52.56	
8	Iran (IRI)	3:55.11	
	Shahin Baradaran	1:01.51	
	Mohammad Alirezaei	1:05.99	
	Hamid Reza Mobarrez	55.55	
	Mohammad Bidarian	52.06	
