= Short course swimming at the 2005 Asian Indoor Games =

- Venue: SAT Swimming Pool
- Dates: 13–17 November 2005

Swimming at the 1st Asian Indoor Games was held 13 to 17 November 2005 at the SAT Swimming Pool, Huamark Sports Complex in Bangkok, Thailand. The competition featured 40 short course (25m) events: 20 for males, 20 for females.

== Medalists ==
=== Men ===
Event	Gold		Silver		Bronze	
50 m freestyle	Ravil Nachaev; Uzbekistan	22.63; GR	Lao Kuan Fong; Macau	23.07	Harbeth Fu; Hong Kong	23.22
100 m freestyle	Ravil Nachaev; Uzbekistan	49.91; GR	Vitaliy Khan; Kazakhstan	50.12	Vyacheslav Titarenko; Kazakhstan	51.07
200 m freestyle	Vitaliy Khan; Kazakhstan	1:49.57; GR	Huang Yushuo; China	1:51.72	Park Min-kyu; South Korea	1:51.85
50 m backstroke	Stanislav Ossinskiy; Kazakhstan	25.50; GR	Kim Myung-hwan; South Korea	26.38	Han Myung-seok; South Korea	26.70
100 m backstroke	Stanislav Ossinskiy; Kazakhstan	54.81; GR	Danil Bugakov; Uzbekistan	56.82	Han Myung-seok; South Korea	57.04
200 m backstroke	Han Myung-seok; South Korea	2:02.65; GR	Stanislav Ossinskiy; Kazakhstan	2:03.14	Sergey Pankov; Uzbekistan	2:03.24
50 m breaststroke	Vladislav Polyakov; Kazakhstan	27.74; GR	Yevgeniy Ryzhkov; Kazakhstan	28.32	Ma Chan Wai; Macau	28.84
100 m breaststroke	Vladislav Polyakov; Kazakhstan	59.11; GR	Yevgeniy Ryzhkov; Kazakhstan	1:00.74	Nattapon Sripreecha; Thailand	1:03.71
200 m breaststroke	Vladislav Polyakov; Kazakhstan	2:07.60; GR	Yevgeniy Ryzhkov; Kazakhstan	2:08.47	Nattapon Sripreecha; Thailand	2:17.59
50 m butterfly	Victor Wong; Macau	24.11; GR	Rustam Khudiyev; Kazakhstan	24.13	Ravil Nachaev; Uzbekistan	24.25
100 m butterfly	Rustam Khudiyev; Kazakhstan	53.55; GR	Victor Wong; Macau	53.75	Ravil Nachaev; Uzbekistan	54.46
200 m butterfly	Won Jae-yun; South Korea	2:03.03; GR	Arjun Muralidharan; India	2:03.33	Sergey Pankov; Uzbekistan	2:05.03
100 m individual medley	Victor Wong; Macau	57.06; GR	Oleg Pukhnatiy; Uzbekistan	57.27	Stanislav Ossinskiy; Kazakhstan	57.32
100 m individual medley	Victor Wong; Macau	57.06; GR	Oleg Pukhnatiy; Uzbekistan	57.27	Iurii Zakharov; Kyrgyzstan	57.32
200 m individual medley	Dmitriy Gordiyenko; Kazakhstan	2:03.24; GR	Kunakorn Yimsomruay; Thailand	2:03.40	Pathunyu Yimsomruay; Thailand	2:03.50
4 × 25 m freestyle relay	Kazakhstan; Vitaliy Khan; Alexandr Sklyar; Vyacheslav Titarenko; Stanislav Kuzmin	41.35; GR	Uzbekistan; Ravil Nachaev; Timur Irgashev; Danil Bugakov; Petr Vasiliev	41.90	Singapore; Ryan Ho; Joshua Lim; Thum Bing Ming; Ernest Teo	42.73
4 × 50 m freestyle relay	Kazakhstan; Stanislav Kuzmin; Alexandr Sklyar; Vyacheslav Titarenko; Vitaliy Khan	1:30.32; GR	Uzbekistan; Ravil Nachaev; Oleg Pukhnatiy; Timur Irgashev; Danil Bugakov	1:32.60	Thailand; Kanapol Sirivadhanakul; Pathunyu Yimsomruay; Kittipong Kotarapakdee; Titiyut Nuntapramote	1:33.56
4 × 100 m freestyle relay	Uzbekistan; Danil Bugakov; Petr Romashkin; Petr Vasiliev; Ravil Nachaev	3:27.90; GR	Singapore; Ernest Teo; Ryan Ho; Thum Bing Ming; Sng Ju Wei	3:27.98	South Korea; Han Myung-seok; Won Jae-yun; Kim Myung-hwan; Park Min-kyu	3:28.58
4 × 25 m medley relay	Kazakhstan; Stanislav Ossinskiy; Vladislav Polyakov; Rustam Khudiyev; Vitaliy Khan	45.13; GR	Uzbekistan; Danil Bugakov; Oleg Pukhnatiy; Ravil Nachaev; Timur Irgashev	47.35	Macau; Lei Chi Lon; Ma Chan Wai; Victor Wong; Lao Kuan Fong	47.52
4 × 50 m medley relay	Kazakhstan; Stanislav Ossinskiy; Vladislav Polyakov; Rustam Khudiyev; Vitaliy Khan	1:38.89; GR	Macau; Lei Chi Lon; Ma Chan Wai; Victor Wong; Lao Kuan Fong	1:42.20	Uzbekistan; Danil Bugakov; Oleg Pukhnatiy; Ravil Nachaev; Timur Irgashev	1:43.16
4 × 100 m medley relay	Kazakhstan; Stanislav Ossinskiy; Vladislav Polyakov; Rustam Khudiyev; Vitaliy Khan	3:35.87; GR	Uzbekistan; Danil Bugakov; Oleg Pukhnatiy; Ravil Nachaev; Timur Irgashev	3:46.57	Thailand; Kunakorn Yimsomruay; Nattapon Sripreecha; Pathunyu Yimsomruay; Kittipong Kotarapakdee	3:47.71

=== Women ===
Event	Gold		Silver		Bronze	
50 m freestyle	Sze Hang Yu; Hong Kong	25.67; GR	Yang Chin-kuei; Chinese Taipei	25.89	Nieh Pin-chieh; Chinese Taipei	26.01
100 m freestyle	Yang Chin-kuei; Chinese Taipei	55.27; GR	Nieh Pin-chieh; Chinese Taipei	56.17	Sze Hang Yu; Hong Kong	56.30
200 m freestyle	Yang Chin-kuei; Chinese Taipei	2:00.44; GR	Xia Chenying; China	2:01.90	Nieh Pin-chieh; Chinese Taipei	2:03.03
50 m backstroke	Bai Anqi; China	29.07; GR	Xie Jue; China	29.65	Shana Lim; Singapore	30.07
100 m backstroke	Bai Anqi; China	1:01.91; GR	Xie Jue; China	1:03.69	Shikha Tandon; India	1:04.91
200 m backstroke	Seo Hee; South Korea	2:19.09; GR	Nathaya Meksamanasak; Thailand	2:20.95	Hoàng Thị Cúc; Vietnam	2:21.56
50 m breaststroke	Suen Ka Yi; Hong Kong	32.95; GR	Roanne Ho; Singapore	33.07	Panward Jitpairoj; Thailand	33.69
100 m breaststroke	Wu Jiaying; China	1:11.98; GR	Suen Ka Yi; Hong Kong	1:12.43	Joyce Wong; Hong Kong	1:12.67
200 m breaststroke	Wu Jiaying; China	2:32.58; GR	Joyce Wong; Hong Kong	2:35.39	Jeong Woo-hee; South Korea	2:36.36
50 m butterfly	Sze Hang Yu; Hong Kong	27.42; GR	Yang Chin-kuei; Chinese Taipei	27.62	Parichat Wongpila; Thailand	28.38
100 m butterfly	Yang Chin-kuei; Chinese Taipei	1:00.46; GR	Sze Hang Yu; Hong Kong	1:01.01	Hu Yue; China	1:02.08
200 m butterfly	Hu Yue; China	2:14.03; GR	Lee Mi-rim; South Korea	2:15.53	Porntip Smithsarakarn; Thailand	2:19.26
100 m individual medley	Sze Hang Yu; Hong Kong	1:03.82; GR	Xia Chenying; China	1:03.91	Zheng Rongrong; China	1:05.54
200 m individual medley	Xia Chenying; China	2:17.50; GR	Zhu Shuyi; China	2:22.43	Lee Hyun-lee; South Korea	2:22.60
4 × 25 m freestyle relay	Hong Kong; Sze Hang Yu; Joyce Wong; Fung Wing Yan; Chan Yu Ning	48.50; GR	Thailand; Thida Tonpongsathorn; Parichat Wongpila; Vanitcha Viriyakipatana; Rutai Santadvatana	49.50	China; Xia Chenying; Zhang Lijun; Zheng Rongrong; Yang Qiongqiong	49.55
4 × 50 m freestyle relay	Hong Kong; Chan Yu Ning; Joyce Wong; Fung Wing Yan; Sze Hang Yu	1:45.44; GR	China; Zhang Lijun; Xia Chenying; Zheng Rongrong; Yang Qiongqiong	1:46.21	Thailand; Thida Tonpongsathorn; Vanitcha Viriyakipatana; Rutai Santadvatana; Parichat Wongpila	1:46.79
4 × 100 m freestyle relay	China; Xia Chenying; Zhang Lijun; Zheng Rongrong; Yang Qiongqiong	3:50.27; GR	Hong Kong; Chan Yu Ning; Joyce Wong; Fung Wing Yan; Sze Hang Yu	3:51.93	Thailand; Nipaporn Tangtorrith; Rutai Santadvatana; Vanitcha Viriyakipatana; Parichat Wongpila	3:52.15
4 × 25 m medley relay	Hong Kong; Chan Yu Ning; Suen Ka Yi; Sze Hang Yu; Fung Wing Yan	53.10; GR	China; Bai Anqi; Wu Jiaying; Hu Yue; Yang Qiongqiong	53.95	Thailand; Thida Tonpongsathorn; Pornphan Pongkajornkitjakarn; Praew Wiboonsuk; Parichat Wongpila	54.37
4 × 50 m medley relay	Hong Kong; Chan Yu Ning; Suen Ka Yi; Sze Hang Yu; Fung Wing Yan	1:55.67; GR	Singapore; Shana Lim; Roanne Ho; Koh Ting Ting; Natasha Lim	1:59.62	South Korea; Seo Hee; Jeong Woo-hee; Lee Mi-rim; Lee Jae-young	2:01.87
4 × 100 m medley relay	China; Bai Anqi; Wu Jiaying; Hu Yue; Yang Qiongqiong	4:11.29; GR	Hong Kong; Chan Yu Ning; Suen Ka Yi; Sze Hang Yu; Fung Wing Yan	4:17.66	Thailand; Wida Uhtsapun; Panward Jitpairoj; Vanitcha Viriyakipatana; Rutai Santadvatana	4:18.84

== Medal table ==
Rank	Nation	Gold	Silver	Bronze	Total
1	Kazakhstan (KAZ)	13	6	2	21
2	China (CHN)	8	8	3	19
3	Hong Kong (HKG)	8	5	3	16
4	Uzbekistan (UZB)	3	6	5	14
5	Chinese Taipei (TPE)	3	3	2	8
6	South Korea (KOR)	3	2	7	12
7	Macau (MAC)	2	3	2	7
8	Thailand (THA)	0	3	12	15
9	Singapore (SIN)	0	3	2	5
10	India (IND)	0	1	1	2
11	Kyrgyzstan (KGZ)	0	0	1	1
11	Vietnam (VIE)	0	0	1	1
Totals (12 entries)		40	40	41	121

== Results ==
=== Men ===
==== 50 m freestyle ====
13 November

Rank	Athlete	Heats	Final
1st place, gold medalist(s)	Ravil Nachaev (UZB)	23.70	22.63
2nd place, silver medalist(s)	Lao Kuan Fong (MAC)	23.43	23.07
3rd place, bronze medalist(s)	Harbeth Fu (HKG)	23.72	23.22
4	Ernest Teo (SIN)	23.50	23.24
5	Vyacheslav Titarenko (KAZ)	23.56	23.28
6	Kanapol Sirivadhanakul (THA)	23.74	23.48
7	Lü Zhiwu (CHN)	23.72	23.62
DQ	Vitaliy Khan (KAZ)	~~23.05~~	~~22.63~~
9	Chan Yiu Bun (HKG)	23.94	
10	Park Min-kyu (KOR)	24.13	
11	Kittipong Kotarapakdee (THA)	24.16	
12	Kenneth Cheok (SIN)	24.18	
13	Obaid Al-Jasmi (UAE)	24.22	
14	Kang Ryong-gu (PRK)	24.24	
15	Petr Romashkin (UZB)	24.51	
16	Mohammed Al-Khudhori (OMA)	24.53	
17	Mohammad Al-Naser (KUW)	24.68	
18	Su Zhengning (CHN)	24.97	
19	Nguyễn Ngọc Quang Bảo (VIE)	25.43	
20	Andryein Tamir (MGL)	25.80	
21	Dawud Al-Khalefi (KUW)	26.25	
22	Mohammed Zaidan Hashim (QAT)	26.47	
23	Cheong Kin Wa (MAC)	26.52	
24	Sari Saleh (IRQ)	27.84	
25	Guwanç Ataniýazow (TKM)	27.96	
26	Khaykeo Viengmany (LAO)	28.33	
27	Bounthanom Vongphachanh (LAO)	28.58	
28	Yoosuf Umar (MDV)	28.80	
29	Hem Thon Ponleu (CAM)	29.19	
30	Hassan Shah (MDV)	30.29	
31	Hojamämmet Hojamämmedow (TKM)	30.47	
—	Yusuf Ahmed (BRN)	DNS	
—	Sufyan Al-Malki (BRN)	DNS	
—	Zaid Al-Marafi (JOR)	DNS	

- Vitaliy Khan of Kazakhstan originally won the gold medal, but was disqualified after he tested positive for Cannabinoid.

==== 100 m freestyle ====
16 November

Rank	Athlete	Heats	Final
1st place, gold medalist(s)	Ravil Nachaev (UZB)	51.26	49.91
2nd place, silver medalist(s)	Vitaliy Khan (KAZ)	51.37	50.12
3rd place, bronze medalist(s)	Vyacheslav Titarenko (KAZ)	51.55	51.07
4	Lao Kuan Fong (MAC)	51.95	51.67
5	Park Min-kyu (KOR)	52.65	51.77
6	Timur Irgashev (UZB)	52.19	52.20
7	Kittipong Kotarapakdee (THA)	52.41	52.25
8	Thum Bing Ming (SIN)	52.73	52.63
9	Sng Ju Wei (SIN)	52.82	
10	Obaid Al-Jasmi (UAE)	52.95	
11	Mohammad Al-Naser (KUW)	53.21	
12	Eric Chan (HKG)	53.40	
13	Waleed Ahmed Hashim (QAT)	53.91	
14	Mohammed Al-Khudhori (OMA)	54.11	
15	Lü Zhiwu (CHN)	54.17	
16	Chung Kwok Leung (HKG)	54.58	
17	Nguyễn Ngọc Quang Bảo (VIE)	55.40	
18	Andryein Tamir (MGL)	56.32	
19	Shi Haoran (CHN)	57.67	
20	Sari Saleh (IRQ)	1:01.77	
21	Victor Wong (MAC)	1:04.20	
—	Zaid Al-Marafi (JOR)	DNS	
—	Kang Ryong-gu (PRK)	DNS	
—	Sufyan Al-Malki (BRN)	DNS	
—	Anas Hamadeh (JOR)	DNS	
—	Yusuf Ahmed (BRN)	DNS	

==== 200 m freestyle ====
14 November

Rank	Athlete	Heats	Final
1st place, gold medalist(s)	Vitaliy Khan (KAZ)	1:53.61	1:49.57
2nd place, silver medalist(s)	Huang Yushuo (CHN)	1:52.49	1:51.72
3rd place, bronze medalist(s)	Park Min-kyu (KOR)	1:52.60	1:51.85
4	Vyacheslav Titarenko (KAZ)	1:54.05	1:53.14
5	Sorasith Hanwiwattana (THA)	1:54.19	1:53.66
6	Sng Ju Wei (SIN)	1:54.20	1:53.69
7	Thum Bing Ming (SIN)	1:54.37	1:54.45
8	Petr Vasiliev (UZB)	1:54.35	1:55.22
9	Timur Irgashev (UZB)	1:54.94	
10	Shi Haoran (CHN)	1:55.10	
11	Supawat Aroonsrimorakot (THA)	1:55.39	
12	Chung Kwok Leung (HKG)	1:56.87	
13	Mohammad Al-Naser (KUW)	1:57.15	
14	Lao Kuan Fong (MAC)	1:57.42	
15	Su Zhengning (CHN)	1:58.55	
16	Waleed Ahmed Hashim (QAT)	1:58.56	
17	Obaid Al-Jasmi (UAE)	1:58.67	
18	Antonio Tong (MAC)	1:59.03	
19	Eric Chan (HKG)	1:59.17	
20	Nguyễn Quang Huy (VIE)	2:01.23	
21	Nisar Ahmed (PAK)	2:04.63	
—	Anas Hamadeh (JOR)	DNS	
—	Yusuf Ahmed (BRN)	DNS	
—	Zaid Al-Marafi (JOR)	DNS	
—	Omar Yusuf (BRN)	DNS	
—	Dmitriy Loginov (UZB)	DNS	

==== 50 m backstroke ====
14 November

Rank	Athlete	Heats	Final
1st place, gold medalist(s)	Stanislav Ossinskiy (KAZ)	26.28	25.50
2nd place, silver medalist(s)	Kim Myung-hwan (KOR)	27.22	26.38
3rd place, bronze medalist(s)	Han Myung-seok (KOR)	27.26	26.70
4	Danil Bugakov (UZB)	26.89	26.92
5	Lei Chi Lon (MAC)	27.50	27.30
6	Arjun Muralidharan (IND)	27.29	27.38
7	Phubodin Satsara (THA)	27.80	27.74
8	Kenneth Cheok (SIN)	28.20	28.32
9	Aiman Al-Kulaibi (OMA)	28.20	
10	Joshua Lim (SIN)	28.29	
11	Wong Ka Seng (MAC)	28.39	
12	Sergey Pankov (UZB)	28.40	
13	Sorasith Hanwiwattana (THA)	28.70	
14	Nguyễn Ngọc Tân (VIE)	28.81	
15	Mohammed Zaidan Hashim (QAT)	29.81	
16	Mubarak Mohamed Al-Besher (UAE)	31.16	
17	Yoosuf Umar (MDV)	39.04	
—	Hojamämmet Hojamämmedow (TKM)	DSQ	
—	Ilya Sharovarin (UZB)	DNS	

==== 100 m backstroke ====
15 November

Rank	Athlete	Heats	Final
1st place, gold medalist(s)	Stanislav Ossinskiy (KAZ)	57.77	54.81
2nd place, silver medalist(s)	Danil Bugakov (UZB)	58.84	56.82
3rd place, bronze medalist(s)	Han Myung-seok (KOR)	58.43	57.04
4	Aiman Al-Kulaibi (OMA)	59.30	59.33
5	Wong Ka Seng (MAC)	1:00.26	59.34
6	Lei Chi Lon (MAC)	1:00.22	59.66
7	Joshua Lim (SIN)	1:00.75	59.76
8	Phubodin Satsara (THA)	1:00.87	1:00.45
9	Nguyễn Ngọc Tân (VIE)	1:02.61	
10	Mohammed Zaidan Hashim (QAT)	1:05.19	
—	Mubarak Mohamed Al-Besher (UAE)	DNS	

==== 200 m backstroke ====
16 November

Rank	Athlete	Heats	Final
1st place, gold medalist(s)	Han Myung-seok (KOR)	2:07.90	2:02.65
2nd place, silver medalist(s)	Stanislav Ossinskiy (KAZ)	2:07.86	2:03.14
3rd place, bronze medalist(s)	Sergey Pankov (UZB)	2:06.11	2:03.24
4	Dmitriy Gordiyenko (KAZ)	2:04.63	2:03.57
5	Kunakorn Yimsomruay (THA)	2:06.75	2:03.90
6	Arjun Muralidharan (IND)	2:10.13	2:05.54
7	Antonio Tong (MAC)	2:10.71	2:10.24
8	Nguyễn Ngọc Tân (VIE)	2:13.86	2:14.09
9	Aiman Al-Kulaibi (OMA)	2:13.87	
10	Joshua Lim (SIN)	2:20.35	
11	Mohammed Zaidan Hashim (QAT)	2:21.12	
—	Mubarak Mohamed Al-Besher (UAE)	DNS	
—	Wong Ka Seng (MAC)	DNS	

==== 50 m breaststroke ====
15 November

Rank	Athlete	Heats	Final
1st place, gold medalist(s)	Vladislav Polyakov (KAZ)	28.37	27.74
2nd place, silver medalist(s)	Yevgeniy Ryzhkov (KAZ)	28.74	28.32
3rd place, bronze medalist(s)	Ma Chan Wai (MAC)	29.15	28.84
4	Nattapon Sripreecha (THA)	29.98	29.49
5	Nguyễn Duy Sơn (VIE)	29.86	29.87
6	Leonard Tan (SIN)	30.03	29.90
7	Mohammad Al-Naser (KUW)	30.15	29.96
8	Eric Chan (HKG)	30.32	30.34
9	Benjamin Ng (SIN)	30.42	
10	Harbeth Fu (HKG)	30.66	
11	Mubarak Mohamed Al-Besher (UAE)	30.84	
12	Lee Chang-bong (KOR)	30.97	
13	Abdulaziz Al-Kandari (KUW)	31.15	
14	Mohammed Al-Shafee (UAE)	32.17	
15	Nasir Mahmood (PAK)	32.53	
16	Ibrahim Nazarov (UZB)	32.54	
17	Lai Lok Sin (MAC)	33.51	
18	Guwanç Ataniýazow (TKM)	33.91	
19	Hem Thon Ponleu (CAM)	34.62	
20	Bounthanom Vongphachanh (LAO)	34.74	
21	Khaykeo Viengmany (LAO)	36.11	
22	Karar Fathal (IRQ)	37.25	
23	Hassan Shah (MDV)	37.78	
—	Osama El-Aarag (QAT)	DSQ	
—	Omar Yusuf (BRN)	DNS	

==== 100 m breaststroke ====
13 November

Rank	Athlete	Heats	Final
1st place, gold medalist(s)	Vladislav Polyakov (KAZ)	1:01.99	59.11
2nd place, silver medalist(s)	Yevgeniy Ryzhkov (KAZ)	1:02.05	1:00.74
3rd place, bronze medalist(s)	Nattapon Sripreecha (THA)	1:03.76	1:03.71
4	Ma Chan Wai (MAC)	1:04.68	1:04.02
5	Nguyễn Duy Sơn (VIE)	1:05.41	1:04.89
6	Leonard Tan (SIN)	1:04.47	1:05.05
7	Lee Chang-bong (KOR)	1:05.19	1:05.53
8	Benjamin Ng (SIN)	1:06.55	1:06.10
9	Humoud Al-Humoud (KUW)	1:06.75	
10	Eric Chan (HKG)	1:07.22	
11	Abdulaziz Al-Kandari (KUW)	1:07.59	
12	Mohammed Al-Shafee (UAE)	1:10.79	
13	Ibrahim Nazarov (UZB)	1:10.86	
14	Osama El-Aarag (QAT)	1:11.77	
15	Nasir Mahmood (PAK)	1:12.10	
16	Guwanç Ataniýazow (TKM)	1:13.43	
17	Lai Lok Sin (MAC)	1:13.84	
18	Hem Thon Ponleu (CAM)	1:15.68	
19	Karar Fathal (IRQ)	1:25.95	
—	Omar Yusuf (BRN)	DNS	

==== 200 m breaststroke ====
17 November

Rank	Athlete	Heats	Final
1st place, gold medalist(s)	Vladislav Polyakov (KAZ)	2:14.73	2:07.60
2nd place, silver medalist(s)	Yevgeniy Ryzhkov (KAZ)	2:15.88	2:08.47
3rd place, bronze medalist(s)	Nattapon Sripreecha (THA)	2:22.93	2:17.59
4	Lee Chang-bong (KOR)	2:20.10	2:17.80
5	Benjamin Ng (SIN)	2:24.22	2:22.49
6	Mohammad Al-Naser (KUW)	2:22.05	2:22.88
7	Nguyễn Duy Sơn (VIE)	2:24.38	2:24.24
8	Abdulaziz Al-Kandari (KUW)	2:27.59	2:29.26
9	Leonard Tan (SIN)	2:24.96	
10	Osama El-Aarag (QAT)	2:28.82	
11	Ma Chan Wai (MAC)	2:29.71	
12	Nasir Mahmood (PAK)	2:35.23	
13	Hem Thon Ponleu (CAM)	2:49.23	
—	Omar Yusuf (BRN)	DNS	

==== 50 m butterfly ====
16 November

Rank	Athlete	Heats	Final
1st place, gold medalist(s)	Victor Wong (MAC)	24.73	24.11
2nd place, silver medalist(s)	Rustam Khudiyev (KAZ)	24.40	24.13
3rd place, bronze medalist(s)	Ravil Nachaev (UZB)	24.74	24.25
4	Chan Yiu Bun (HKG)	25.87	25.30
5	Stanislav Kuzmin (KAZ)	25.49	25.31
6	Danil Bugakov (UZB)	25.90	25.66
7	Nicholas Tan (SIN)	25.80	25.91
8	Kang Ryong-gu (PRK)	26.21	26.19
9	Ernest Teo (SIN)	26.00	
10	Pathunyu Yimsomruay (THA)	26.19	
11	Phubodin Satsara (THA)	26.38	
12	Nguyễn Ngọc Quang Bảo (VIE)	26.48	
13	Won Jae-yun (KOR)	26.88	
14	Ahmed Salamoun (QAT)	27.59	
15	Abdulaziz Al-Kandari (KUW)	27.95	
16	Hojamämmet Hojamämmedow (TKM)	30.73	
17	Yoosuf Umar (MDV)	31.70	
18	Hassan Shah (MDV)	34.58	
—	Zaid Al-Marafi (JOR)	DNS	
—	Hesham Fadhul (BRN)	DNS	

==== 100 m butterfly ====
14 November

Rank	Athlete	Heats	Final
1st place, gold medalist(s)	Rustam Khudiyev (KAZ)	54.82	53.55
2nd place, silver medalist(s)	Victor Wong (MAC)	55.38	53.75
3rd place, bronze medalist(s)	Ravil Nachaev (UZB)	55.87	54.46
4	Stanislav Kuzmin (KAZ)	55.01	54.73
5	Chatmongkon Noiaree (THA)	56.24	56.37
6	Arjun Muralidharan (IND)	56.54	56.53
7	Won Jae-yun (KOR)	56.79	57.38
8	Nguyễn Ngọc Quang Bảo (VIE)	58.12	57.86
9	Pathunyu Yimsomruay (THA)	56.66	
10	Danil Bugakov (UZB)	57.55	
11	Kang Ryong-gu (PRK)	58.29	
12	Abdulaziz Al-Kandari (KUW)	1:00.48	
13	Su Zhengning (CHN)	1:00.97	
14	Ahmed Salamoun (QAT)	1:01.28	
15	Jamal Al-Suwaidi (UAE)	1:05.55	
—	Nicholas Tan (SIN)	DSQ	
—	Hesham Fadhul (BRN)	DNS	

==== 200 m butterfly ====
15 November

Rank	Athlete	Heats	Final
1st place, gold medalist(s)	Won Jae-yun (KOR)	2:06.71	2:03.03
2nd place, silver medalist(s)	Arjun Muralidharan (IND)	2:05.00	2:03.33
3rd place, bronze medalist(s)	Sergey Pankov (UZB)	2:09.40	2:05.03
4	Nguyễn Quang Huy (VIE)	2:07.22	2:05.35
5	Nicholas Tan (SIN)	2:09.39	2:06.43
6	Rinat Imyaminov (UZB)	2:07.89	2:06.92
7	Ahmed Salamoun (QAT)	2:08.42	2:10.24
—	Victor Wong (MAC)	2:05.47	DNS
9	Kasidit Veerabhatkosol (THA)	2:13.73	
10	Nguyễn Ngọc Quang Bảo (VIE)	2:13.96	
11	Jamal Al-Suwaidi (UAE)	2:26.66	
—	Hesham Fadhul (BRN)	DNS	
—	Dmitriy Gordiyenko (KAZ)	DNS	

==== 100 m individual medley ====
17 November

Rank	Athlete	Heats	Final
1st place, gold medalist(s)	Victor Wong (MAC)	59.13	57.06
2nd place, silver medalist(s)	Oleg Pukhnatiy (UZB)	58.65	57.27
3rd place, bronze medalist(s)	Stanislav Ossinskiy (KAZ)	59.06	57.32
3rd place, bronze medalist(s)	Iurii Zakharov (KGZ)	57.73	57.32
5	Dmitriy Gordiyenko (KAZ)	57.99	57.38
6	Pathunyu Yimsomruay (THA)	59.03	57.64
7	Vasilii Danilov (KGZ)	59.29	58.89
8	Lao Kuan Fong (MAC)	59.27	59.10
9	Thum Bing Ming (SIN)	59.34	
10	Petr Vasiliev (UZB)	59.39	
11	Kim Myung-hwan (KOR)	59.50	
12	Arjun Muralidharan (IND)	59.80	
13	Harbeth Fu (HKG)	1:00.42	
14	Nattapon Sripreecha (THA)	1:00.61	
15	Mohammad Al-Naser (KUW)	1:00.71	
16	Waleed Ahmed Hashim (QAT)	1:00.94	
17	Nguyễn Quang Huy (VIE)	1:02.68	
18	Kang Ryong-gu (PRK)	1:03.32	
19	Nisar Ahmed (PAK)	1:03.45	
20	Ryan Ho (SIN)	1:03.49	
21	Ahmed Salamoun (QAT)	1:04.23	
22	Hassan Shah (MDV)	1:18.69	
23	Yoosuf Umar (MDV)	1:18.86	
—	Anas Hamadeh (JOR)	DNS	

==== 200 m individual medley ====
13 November

Rank	Athlete	Heats	Final
1st place, gold medalist(s)	Dmitriy Gordiyenko (KAZ)	2:05.78	2:03.24
2nd place, silver medalist(s)	Kunakorn Yimsomruay (THA)	2:05.70	2:03.40
3rd place, bronze medalist(s)	Pathunyu Yimsomruay (THA)	2:06.48	2:03.50
4	Iurii Zakharov (KGZ)	2:03.73	2:04.28
5	Kim Myung-hwan (KOR)	2:05.73	2:05.56
6	Oleg Pukhnatiy (UZB)	2:08.92	2:06.08
7	Vasilii Danilov (KGZ)	2:06.49	2:06.39
—	Victor Wong (MAC)	2:08.18	DNS
9	Thum Bing Ming (SIN)	2:08.39	
10	Arjun Muralidharan (IND)	2:09.02	
11	Nguyễn Quang Huy (VIE)	2:13.06	
11	Mohammad Al-Naser (KUW)	2:13.06	
13	Rinat Imyaminov (UZB)	2:13.15	
14	Joshua Lim (SIN)	2:15.29	
15	Marzouq Al-Salem (KUW)	2:15.82	
16	Antonio Tong (MAC)	2:15.85	
17	Waleed Ahmed Hashim (QAT)	2:16.23	
18	Nisar Ahmed (PAK)	2:17.64	
19	Ahmed Salamoun (QAT)	2:24.00	
—	Anas Hamadeh (JOR)	DNS	
—	Shohrukh Yunusov (UZB)	DNS	

==== 4 × 25 m freestyle relay ====
17 November

Rank	Team	Final
1st place, gold medalist(s)	Kazakhstan (KAZ)	41.35
2nd place, silver medalist(s)	Uzbekistan (UZB)	41.90
3rd place, bronze medalist(s)	Singapore (SIN)	42.73
4	Hong Kong (HKG)	43.05
5	Thailand (THA)	43.24
6	South Korea (KOR)	43.91
7	China (CHN)	44.18
8	Qatar (QAT)	46.11

==== 4 × 50 m freestyle relay ====
15 November

Rank	Team	Heats	Final
1st place, gold medalist(s)	Kazakhstan (KAZ)	1:34.50	1:30.32
2nd place, silver medalist(s)	Uzbekistan (UZB)	1:34.62	1:32.60
3rd place, bronze medalist(s)	Thailand (THA)	1:35.67	1:33.56
4	Hong Kong (HKG)	1:35.62	1:34.37
5	South Korea (KOR)	1:36.75	1:35.91
6	China (CHN)	1:36.48	1:38.09
—	Macau (MAC)	1:40.71	DSQ
—	Singapore (SIN)	1:35.98	DSQ
9	Qatar (QAT)	1:42.96	

==== 4 × 100 m freestyle relay ====
13 November

Rank	Team	Heats	Final
1st place, gold medalist(s)	Uzbekistan (UZB)	3:28.81	3:27.90
2nd place, silver medalist(s)	Singapore (SIN)	3:30.91	3:27.98
3rd place, bronze medalist(s)	South Korea (KOR)	3:30.05	3:28.58
4	China (CHN)	3:29.57	3:28.92
5	Macau (MAC)	3:34.13	3:30.20
6	Hong Kong (HKG)	3:32.16	3:30.39
7	Thailand (THA)	3:32.24	3:31.03
DQ	Kazakhstan (KAZ)	~~3:26.04~~	~~3:19.35~~
9	Kuwait (KUW)	3:48.55	
10	Qatar (QAT)	3:59.53	

- Kazakhstan originally won the gold medal, but was disqualified after Vitaliy Khan tested positive for Cannabinoid.

==== 4 × 25 m medley relay ====
17 November

Rank	Team	Heats	Final
1st place, gold medalist(s)	Kazakhstan (KAZ)	46.07	45.13
2nd place, silver medalist(s)	Uzbekistan (UZB)	48.03	47.35
3rd place, bronze medalist(s)	Macau (MAC)	48.10	47.52
4	Singapore (SIN)	49.31	48.07
5	Thailand (THA)	49.07	48.50
6	Hong Kong (HKG)	50.08	49.81
7	Vietnam (VIE)	51.46	51.15
—	South Korea (KOR)	49.28	DSQ
9	China (CHN)	52.10	
10	Qatar (QAT)	52.25	
11	United Arab Emirates (UAE)	52.66	

==== 4 × 50 m medley relay ====
16 November

Rank	Team	Heats	Final
1st place, gold medalist(s)	Kazakhstan (KAZ)	1:44.99	1:38.89
2nd place, silver medalist(s)	Macau (MAC)	1:44.89	1:42.20
3rd place, bronze medalist(s)	Uzbekistan (UZB)	1:47.14	1:43.16
4	Thailand (THA)	1:46.01	1:44.33
5	Singapore (SIN)	1:46.89	1:46.07
6	South Korea (KOR)	1:47.62	1:46.41
7	Hong Kong (HKG)	1:48.82	1:48.57
8	Vietnam (VIE)	1:51.51	1:50.96
9	Qatar (QAT)	1:54.45	
10	China (CHN)	1:58.01	
—	United Arab Emirates (UAE)	DSQ	

==== 4 × 100 m medley relay ====
14 November

Rank	Team	Heats	Final
1st place, gold medalist(s)	Kazakhstan (KAZ)	3:47.55	3:35.87
2nd place, silver medalist(s)	Uzbekistan (UZB)	3:54.52	3:46.57
3rd place, bronze medalist(s)	Thailand (THA)	3:53.78	3:47.71
4	Macau (MAC)	4:01.00	3:48.93
5	South Korea (KOR)	3:55.52	3:51.57
6	Vietnam (VIE)	4:05.72	4:03.26
—	Singapore (SIN)	3:58.39	DSQ
—	Hong Kong (HKG)	4:07.66	DSQ
9	China (CHN)	4:07.84	
10	United Arab Emirates (UAE)	4:18.95	
11	Qatar (QAT)	4:20.09	

=== Women ===
==== 50 m freestyle ====
13 November

Rank	Athlete	Heats	Final
1st place, gold medalist(s)	Sze Hang Yu (HKG)	25.84	25.67
2nd place, silver medalist(s)	Yang Chin-kuei (TPE)	26.42	25.89
3rd place, bronze medalist(s)	Nieh Pin-chieh (TPE)	26.28	26.01
4	Chan Yu Ning (HKG)	26.40	26.42
5	Lee Jae-young (KOR)	26.97	26.74
6	Irina Shlemova (UZB)	26.68	26.87
7	Shikha Tandon (IND)	27.07	26.89
8	Thida Tonpongsathorn (THA)	27.09	26.97
9	Yang Qiongqiong (CHN)	27.37	
10	Pang Si Jia (SIN)	27.45	
11	Rutai Santadvatana (THA)	27.46	
12	Natasha Lim (SIN)	27.60	
13	Nguyễn Thị Thu Trang (VIE)	28.24	
14	Lê Thị Anh Thư (VIE)	28.30	
15	Elena Ostanina (UZB)	28.81	
16	Kou Weng Cheong (MAC)	29.56	
17	Aminath Rouya Hussain (MDV)	30.25	
18	Sana Abdul Wahid (PAK)	30.88	
19	Vilayphone Vongphachanh (LAO)	35.42	
20	Hem Thon Vitiny (CAM)	35.49	
21	Soulamphone Keuthla (LAO)	36.07	
—	Galina Dukhanova (UZB)	DNS	
—	Sameera Al-Bitar (BRN)	DNS	
—	Jamana Taraif (BRN)	DNS	

==== 100 m freestyle ====
16 November

Rank	Athlete	Heats	Final
1st place, gold medalist(s)	Yang Chin-kuei (TPE)	56.85	55.27
2nd place, silver medalist(s)	Nieh Pin-chieh (TPE)	57.46	56.17
3rd place, bronze medalist(s)	Sze Hang Yu (HKG)	57.42	56.30
4	Fung Wing Yan (HKG)	58.14	57.55
5	Irina Shlemova (UZB)	57.48	57.90
6	Lee Jae-young (KOR)	58.19	58.17
7	Shikha Tandon (IND)	59.13	58.65
8	Natasha Lim (SIN)	59.96	1:00.93
9	Parichat Wongpila (THA)	58.66	
10	Stephanie Chong (SIN)	1:00.45	
11	Lê Thị Anh Thư (VIE)	1:00.68	
12	Nguyễn Thị Thu Trang (VIE)	1:01.08	
13	Fong Man Wai (MAC)	1:01.46	
14	Elena Ostanina (UZB)	1:02.35	
15	Che Lok Man (MAC)	1:02.86	
16	Yang Qiongqiong (CHN)	1:02.94	
17	Rutai Santadvatana (THA)	1:03.91	
18	Sana Abdul Wahid (PAK)	1:08.22	
19	Rida Sabahat (PAK)	1:10.77	
20	Hem Thon Vitiny (CAM)	1:20.86	
—	Sameera Al-Bitar (BRN)	DNS	
—	Jamana Taraif (BRN)	DNS	

==== 200 m freestyle ====
14 November

Rank	Athlete	Heats	Final
1st place, gold medalist(s)	Yang Chin-kuei (TPE)	2:02.77	2:00.44
2nd place, silver medalist(s)	Xia Chenying (CHN)	2:03.85	2:01.90
3rd place, bronze medalist(s)	Nieh Pin-chieh (TPE)	2:03.74	2:03.03
4	Zheng Rongrong (CHN)	2:04.98	2:04.22
5	Parichat Wongpila (THA)	2:09.07	2:04.93
6	Fung Wing Yan (HKG)	2:07.57	2:05.29
7	Nipaporn Tangtorrith (THA)	2:08.27	2:05.40
8	Lee Jae-young (KOR)	2:09.52	2:07.94
9	Lee Hyun-lee (KOR)	2:10.54	
10	Fong Man Wai (MAC)	2:11.06	
11	Pang Si Jia (SIN)	2:14.32	
12	Stephanie Chong (SIN)	2:14.94	
13	Lê Thị Anh Thư (VIE)	2:15.47	
14	Che Lok Man (MAC)	2:17.25	
15	Karishma Karki (NEP)	2:47.44	
—	Zhang Lijun (CHN)	DSQ	
—	Maftunabonu Tukhtasinova (UZB)	DNS	
—	Anna Fomina (UZB)	DNS	
—	Sameera Al-Bitar (BRN)	DNS	

==== 50 m backstroke ====
14 November

Rank	Athlete	Heats	Final
1st place, gold medalist(s)	Bai Anqi (CHN)	29.65	29.07
2nd place, silver medalist(s)	Xie Jue (CHN)	29.94	29.65
3rd place, bronze medalist(s)	Shana Lim (SIN)	30.92	30.07
4	Wida Uhtsapun (THA)	30.25	30.21
5	Chan Yu Ning (HKG)	29.76	30.28
6	Shikha Tandon (IND)	30.93	30.52
7	Praew Wiboonsuk (THA)	31.75	30.64
8	Seo Hee (KOR)	31.35	31.18
9	Hoàng Thị Cúc (VIE)	32.26	
10	Kou Weng Cheong (MAC)	32.85	
11	Rida Sabahat (PAK)	36.18	
12	Aminath Rouya Hussain (MDV)	37.15	
13	Mariyam Nafha Ali (MDV)	37.36	
—	Latifa Al-Alawi (BRN)	DNS	
—	Ekaterina Mamatkulova (UZB)	DNS	
—	Saida Iskandarova (UZB)	DNS	

==== 100 m backstroke ====
15 November

Rank	Athlete	Heats	Final
1st place, gold medalist(s)	Bai Anqi (CHN)	1:04.03	1:01.91
2nd place, silver medalist(s)	Xie Jue (CHN)	1:05.49	1:03.69
3rd place, bronze medalist(s)	Shikha Tandon (IND)	1:06.13	1:04.91
4	Seo Hee (KOR)	1:05.82	1:04.99
5	Nathaya Meksamanasak (THA)	1:06.54	1:06.22
6	Shana Lim (SIN)	1:07.77	1:06.36
7	Wida Uhtsapun (THA)	1:06.88	1:06.63
8	Hoàng Thị Cúc (VIE)	1:08.85	1:07.44
9	Chan Yu Ning (HKG)	1:08.28	
10	Fong Man Wai (MAC)	1:09.16	
—	Rida Sabahat (PAK)	DSQ	

==== 200 m backstroke ====
16 November

Rank	Athlete	Final
1st place, gold medalist(s)	Seo Hee (KOR)	2:19.09
2nd place, silver medalist(s)	Nathaya Meksamanasak (THA)	2:20.95
3rd place, bronze medalist(s)	Hoàng Thị Cúc (VIE)	2:21.56
4	Chayanin Vungdeethum (THA)	2:22.49
5	Joyce Wong (HKG)	2:22.65

==== 50 m breaststroke ====
15 November

Rank	Athlete	Heats	Final
1st place, gold medalist(s)	Suen Ka Yi (HKG)	33.28	32.95
2nd place, silver medalist(s)	Roanne Ho (SIN)	33.27	33.07
3rd place, bronze medalist(s)	Panward Jitpairoj (THA)	33.81	33.69
4	Ri Chun-mi (PRK)	33.67	33.84
5	Pornphan Pongkajornkitjakarn (THA)	34.06	33.88
6	Wu Jiaying (CHN)	34.02	33.90
7	Joyce Wong (HKG)	34.81	33.97
8	Jeong Woo-hee (KOR)	34.98	35.57
9	Lei Sin Ian (MAC)	35.61	
10	Phạm Thị Huệ (VIE)	35.71	
11	Natasha Lim (SIN)	36.44	
12	Sana Abdul Wahid (PAK)	39.51	
13	Mariyam Nafha Ali (MDV)	42.21	
14	Hem Thon Vitiny (CAM)	42.91	
15	Vilayphone Vongphachanh (LAO)	45.17	
16	Soulamphone Keuthla (LAO)	45.63	
—	Latifa Al-Alawi (BRN)	DNS	
—	Naima Abdulnabi (BRN)	DNS	
—	Tamila Gabdrakhmanova (UZB)	DNS	
—	Mushtariybegim Ahmedova (UZB)	DNS	

==== 100 m breaststroke ====
13 November

Rank	Athlete	Heats	Final
1st place, gold medalist(s)	Wu Jiaying (CHN)	1:13.13	1:11.98
2nd place, silver medalist(s)	Suen Ka Yi (HKG)	1:13.25	1:12.43
3rd place, bronze medalist(s)	Joyce Wong (HKG)	1:14.66	1:12.67
4	Panward Jitpairoj (THA)	1:13.51	1:12.96
5	Ri Chun-mi (PRK)	1:13.96	1:13.41
6	Roanne Ho (SIN)	1:15.47	1:14.36
7	Jeong Woo-hee (KOR)	1:14.72	1:15.19
8	Phạm Thị Huệ (VIE)	1:14.80	1:15.68
9	Paphitchaya Kerdthongtavee (THA)	1:17.13	
10	Zhu Shuyi (CHN)	1:17.99	
11	Lei Sin Ian (MAC)	1:18.29	
12	Mariyam Nafha Ali (MDV)	1:36.47	
13	Hem Thon Vitiny (CAM)	1:36.76	
—	Lobarkhon Muradova (UZB)	DNS	
—	Sameera Al-Bitar (BRN)	DNS	
—	Latifa Al-Alawi (BRN)	DNS	

==== 200 m breaststroke ====
17 November

Rank	Athlete	Heats	Final
1st place, gold medalist(s)	Wu Jiaying (CHN)	2:43.61	2:32.58
2nd place, silver medalist(s)	Joyce Wong (HKG)	2:41.70	2:35.39
3rd place, bronze medalist(s)	Jeong Woo-hee (KOR)	2:41.62	2:36.36
4	Phạm Thị Huệ (VIE)	2:43.82	2:39.72
5	Panward Jitpairoj (THA)	2:44.96	2:40.06
6	Suen Ka Yi (HKG)	2:47.76	2:45.46
7	Lei Sin Ian (MAC)	2:49.30	2:47.83
—	Roanne Ho (SIN)	2:47.59	DNS
9	Paphitchaya Kerdthongtavee (THA)	2:51.45	

==== 50 m butterfly ====
16 November

Rank	Athlete	Heats	Final
1st place, gold medalist(s)	Sze Hang Yu (HKG)	27.78	27.42
2nd place, silver medalist(s)	Yang Chin-kuei (TPE)	28.65	27.62
3rd place, bronze medalist(s)	Parichat Wongpila (THA)	28.91	28.38
4	Irina Shlemova (UZB)	28.77	28.54
5	Praew Wiboonsuk (THA)	29.10	28.56
6	Lee Mi-rim (KOR)	29.36	28.80
7	Koh Ting Ting (SIN)	29.68	29.61
8	Christel Fung (SIN)	30.52	30.59
9	Long Chi Wun (MAC)	31.16	
10	Wu Jiaying (CHN)	32.60	
11	Sana Abdul Wahid (PAK)	32.77	
12	Hu Yue (CHN)	33.29	
13	Aminath Rouya Hussain (MDV)	33.56	
14	Rida Sabahat (PAK)	34.82	
—	Jamana Taraif (BRN)	DNS	

==== 100 m butterfly ====
14 November

Rank	Athlete	Heats	Final
1st place, gold medalist(s)	Yang Chin-kuei (TPE)	1:01.40	1:00.46
2nd place, silver medalist(s)	Sze Hang Yu (HKG)	1:01.98	1:01.01
3rd place, bronze medalist(s)	Hu Yue (CHN)	1:02.11	1:02.08
4	Lee Mi-rim (KOR)	1:03.90	1:02.60
5	Irina Shlemova (UZB)	1:03.64	1:03.55
6	Porntip Smithsarakarn (THA)	1:03.88	1:04.20
7	Koh Ting Ting (SIN)	1:05.14	1:05.06
8	Vanitcha Viriyakipatana (THA)	1:04.78	1:08.92
9	Lam Sin I (MAC)	1:06.19	
10	Christel Fung (SIN)	1:06.89	
11	Lê Thị Anh Thư (VIE)	1:07.81	
12	Sana Abdul Wahid (PAK)	1:16.27	
—	Nodira Alimdjanova (UZB)	DNS	
—	Galina Dukhanova (UZB)	DNS	

==== 200 m butterfly ====
15 November

Rank	Athlete	Final
1st place, gold medalist(s)	Hu Yue (CHN)	2:14.03
2nd place, silver medalist(s)	Lee Mi-rim (KOR)	2:15.53
3rd place, bronze medalist(s)	Porntip Smithsarakarn (THA)	2:19.26
4	Christel Fung (SIN)	2:21.47
5	Chayanin Vungdeethum (THA)	2:23.15
6	Koh Ting Ting (SIN)	2:23.67
7	Lam Sin I (MAC)	2:23.75

==== 100 m individual medley ====
17 November

Rank	Athlete	Heats	Final
1st place, gold medalist(s)	Sze Hang Yu (HKG)	1:04.56	1:03.82
2nd place, silver medalist(s)	Xia Chenying (CHN)	1:08.08	1:03.91
3rd place, bronze medalist(s)	Zheng Rongrong (CHN)	1:05.94	1:05.54
4	Shikha Tandon (IND)	1:07.60	1:06.22
5	Nguyễn Thị Thu Trang (VIE)	1:09.12	1:07.66
6	Lee Hyun-lee (KOR)	1:08.33	1:07.71
7	Chayanin Vungdeethum (THA)	1:09.43	1:08.84
—	Ri Chun-mi (PRK)	1:08.84	DNS
9	Koh Ting Ting (SIN)	1:10.31	
10	Shana Lim (SIN)	1:12.21	
11	Sana Abdul Wahid (PAK)	1:18.78	
12	Aminath Rouya Hussain (MDV)	1:19.76	
13	Rida Sabahat (PAK)	1:19.96	
14	Mariyam Nafha Ali (MDV)	1:25.24	

==== 200 m individual medley ====
13 November

Rank	Athlete	Heats	Final
1st place, gold medalist(s)	Xia Chenying (CHN)	2:19.60	2:17.50
2nd place, silver medalist(s)	Zhu Shuyi (CHN)	2:24.17	2:22.43
3rd place, bronze medalist(s)	Lee Hyun-lee (KOR)	2:25.53	2:22.60
4	Nguyễn Thị Thu Trang (VIE)	2:26.38	2:24.98
5	Chayanin Vungdeethum (THA)	2:25.49	2:25.00
6	Fong Man Wai (MAC)	2:29.08	2:29.75
7	Koh Ting Ting (SIN)	2:29.03	2:31.88
8	Karishma Karki (NEP)	3:06.67	3:05.04
9	Rida Sabahat (PAK)	3:00.10	
—	Pang Si Jia (SIN)	DNS	

==== 4 × 25 m freestyle relay ====
17 November

Rank	Team	Final
1st place, gold medalist(s)	Hong Kong (HKG)	48.50
2nd place, silver medalist(s)	Thailand (THA)	49.50
3rd place, bronze medalist(s)	China (CHN)	49.55
4	Singapore (SIN)	50.81
5	South Korea (KOR)	51.41
—	Macau (MAC)	DSQ

==== 4 × 50 m freestyle relay ====
15 November

Rank	Team	Final
1st place, gold medalist(s)	Hong Kong (HKG)	1:45.44
2nd place, silver medalist(s)	China (CHN)	1:46.21
3rd place, bronze medalist(s)	Thailand (THA)	1:46.79
4	Singapore (SIN)	1:49.85
5	South Korea (KOR)	1:50.66
6	Macau (MAC)	1:53.57
—	Bahrain (BRN)	DNS

==== 4 × 100 m freestyle relay ====
13 November

Rank	Team	Final
1st place, gold medalist(s)	China (CHN)	3:50.27
2nd place, silver medalist(s)	Hong Kong (HKG)	3:51.93
3rd place, bronze medalist(s)	Thailand (THA)	3:52.15
4	South Korea (KOR)	3:58.81
5	Singapore (SIN)	4:00.42
6	Macau (MAC)	4:10.00
—	Uzbekistan (UZB)	DNS

==== 4 × 25 m medley relay ====
17 November

Rank	Team	Final
1st place, gold medalist(s)	Hong Kong (HKG)	53.10
2nd place, silver medalist(s)	China (CHN)	53.95
3rd place, bronze medalist(s)	Thailand (THA)	54.37
4	Singapore (SIN)	55.15
5	South Korea (KOR)	57.00
6	Vietnam (VIE)	58.33
7	Macau (MAC)	59.20

==== 4 × 50 m medley relay ====
16 November

Rank	Team	Final
1st place, gold medalist(s)	Hong Kong (HKG)	1:55.67
2nd place, silver medalist(s)	Singapore (SIN)	1:59.62
3rd place, bronze medalist(s)	South Korea (KOR)	2:01.87
4	Vietnam (VIE)	2:04.46
5	Macau (MAC)	2:06.74
—	Thailand (THA)	DSQ

==== 4 × 100 m medley relay ====
14 November

Rank	Team	Final
1st place, gold medalist(s)	China (CHN)	4:11.29
2nd place, silver medalist(s)	Hong Kong (HKG)	4:17.66
3rd place, bronze medalist(s)	Thailand (THA)	4:18.84
4	South Korea (KOR)	4:21.94
5	Singapore (SIN)	4:28.85
6	Vietnam (VIE)	4:32.29
7	Macau (MAC)	4:34.92
