= Swimming at the 2006 Asian Games – Men's 50 metre butterfly =

Men's 50 metre butterfly at the 2006 Asian Games
- Venue: Hamad Aquatic Centre
- Date: 5 December 2006
- Competitors: 39 from 25 nations

Medalists
gold medal	Zhou Jiawei	China
silver medal	Ryo Takayasu	Japan
bronze medal	Wang Dong	China

The men's 50m butterfly swimming event at the 2006 Asian Games was held on December 5, 2006, at the Hamad Aquatic Centre in Doha, Qatar.

== Schedule ==
All times are Arabia Standard Time (UTC+03:00)

Date	Time	Event
Tuesday, 5 December 2006	10:00	Heats
Tuesday, 5 December 2006	18:00	Final

== Records ==
Prior to this competition, the existing world, Asian and Games records were as follows.

World Record	Roland Schoeman (RSA)	22.96	Montreal, Canada	25 July 2005
Asian Record	Zhou Jiawei (CHN)	23.86	Luoyang, China	12 May 2006
Games Record	Ryo Takayasu (JPN)	24.71	Doha, Qatar	3 December 2006

== Results ==
=== Heats ===
Rank	Heat	Athlete	Time	Notes
1	3	Zhou Jiawei (CHN)	24.59	GR
2	4	Wang Dong (CHN)	24.68	
2	5	Ryo Takayasu (JPN)	24.68	
4	4	Takashi Yamamoto (JPN)	24.71	
5	3	Jeong Doo-hee (KOR)	24.76	
6	3	Rustam Khudiyev (KAZ)	24.95	
7	3	Kim Min-suk (KOR)	25.09	
8	3	Stanislav Kuzmin (KAZ)	25.17	
9	5	Victor Wong (MAC)	25.21	
10	4	Oleg Lyashko (UZB)	25.28	
11	4	Alex Lim (MAS)	25.37	
12	5	Ravil Nachaev (UZB)	25.41	
13	5	Daniel Bego (MAS)	25.48	
14	4	Hamid Reza Mobarrez (IRI)	25.55	
15	4	Virdhawal Khade (IND)	25.59	
16	2	Ankur Poseria (IND)	25.92	
16	3	Bader Al-Muhana (KSA)	25.92	
18	3	Zento Lee (HKG)	25.93	
19	5	James Walsh (PHI)	26.02	
20	5	Lao Kuan Fong (MAC)	26.03	
21	2	Enchong Dee (PHI)	26.13	
22	4	Philip Yee (HKG)	26.27	
23	5	Hsu Chi-chieh (TPE)	26.31	
24	2	Nawaf Haidar (KUW)	26.75	
25	2	Ahmed Salamoun (QAT)	26.77	
26	5	Moyssara El-Aarag (QAT)	26.84	
27	4	Yevgeny Petrashov (KGZ)	26.85	
28	3	Đỗ Huy Long (VIE)	26.87	
29	2	Rami Anis (SYR)	26.98	
30	2	Jewel Ahmed (BAN)	27.01	
31	2	Milinda Wickramasinghe (SRI)	27.08	
32	2	Saeid Maleka Ashtiani (IRI)	27.24	
33	1	Enkhtaivany Battushig (MGL)	27.97	
34	1	Nasir Ali (PAK)	28.41	
35	1	Wasseim Surey (PLE)	28.65	
36	1	Sovan Nareth (CAM)	29.37	
37	1	Ahmed Al-Demery (PLE)	29.47	
38	1	Narantsogiin Tsogjargal (MGL)	31.63	
39	1	Ali Mohamed Raaidh (MDV)	32.59	

=== Final ===
Rank	Athlete	Time	Notes
1st place, gold medalist(s)	Zhou Jiawei (CHN)	23.94	GR
2nd place, silver medalist(s)	Ryo Takayasu (JPN)	24.11	
3rd place, bronze medalist(s)	Wang Dong (CHN)	24.23	
4	Takashi Yamamoto (JPN)	24.26	
5	Rustam Khudiyev (KAZ)	24.72	
6	Jeong Doo-hee (KOR)	24.76	
7	Kim Min-suk (KOR)	24.89	
8	Stanislav Kuzmin (KAZ)	24.95	
