= Swimming at the 2006 Asian Games – Men's 100 metre butterfly =

Men's 100 metre butterfly at the 2006 Asian Games
- Venue: Hamad Aquatic Centre
- Date: 3 December 2006
- Competitors: 32 from 22 nations

Medalists
gold medal	Takashi Yamamoto	Japan
silver medal	Ryo Takayasu	Japan
bronze medal	Wang Dong	China

The men's 100m butterfly swimming event at the 2006 Asian Games was held on December 3, 2006 at the Hamad Aquatic Centre in Doha, Qatar.

== Schedule ==
All times are Arabia Standard Time (UTC+03:00)

Date	Time	Event
Sunday, 3 December 2006	10:00	Heats
Sunday, 3 December 2006	18:00	Final

== Records ==
Prior to this competition, the existing world, Asian and Games records were as follows.

World Record	Ian Crocker (USA)	50.40	Montreal, Canada	30 July 2005
Asian Record	Takashi Yamamoto (JPN)	52.27	Barcelona, Spain	26 July 2003
Games Record	Takashi Yamamoto (JPN)	52.59	Busan, South Korea	3 October 2002

== Results ==
=== Heats ===
Rank	Heat	Athlete	Time	Notes
1	3	Ryo Takayasu (JPN)	53.30	
2	4	Takashi Yamamoto (JPN)	53.34	
3	3	Jeong Doo-hee (KOR)	53.76	
4	2	Wang Dong (CHN)	54.47	
5	2	Daniel Bego (MAS)	54.93	
6	2	Stanislav Kuzmin (KAZ)	54.99	
7	4	Zhou Jiawei (CHN)	55.07	
8	3	Hsu Chi-chieh (TPE)	55.29	
9	4	Rustam Khudiyev (KAZ)	55.49	
10	2	Victor Wong (MAC)	55.55	
11	4	Oleg Lyashko (UZB)	55.67	
12	4	James Walsh (PHI)	55.91	
13	3	Arjun Muralidharan (IND)	56.16	
14	2	Chung Yong (KOR)	56.21	
15	3	Hamid Reza Mobarrez (IRI)	56.51	
16	3	Bader Al-Muhana (KSA)	56.92	
17	4	Zento Lee (HKG)	57.06	
18	3	Ankur Poseria (IND)	57.14	
19	2	Enchong Dee (PHI)	57.18	
20	4	David Wong (HKG)	57.70	
21	1	Rami Anis (SYR)	58.31	
22	2	Zainalabdeen Qali (KUW)	58.78	
23	4	Lao Kuan Fong (MAC)	58.92	
24	3	Saeid Maleka Ashtiani (IRI)	59.09	
25	2	Ahmed Salamoun (QAT)	59.60	
26	1	Nasir Ali (PAK)	1:00.22	
27	1	Jewel Ahmed (BAN)	1:00.89	
28	1	Enkhtaivany Battushig (MGL)	1:01.69	
29	1	Milinda Wickramasinghe (SRI)	1:02.13	
30	1	Fadi Awesat (PLE)	1:05.14	
31	1	Narantsogiin Tsogjargal (MGL)	1:11.18	
32	1	Ali Mohamed Raaidh (MDV)	1:13.08	

=== Final ===
Rank	Athlete	Time	Notes
1st place, gold medalist(s)	Takashi Yamamoto (JPN)	52.54	GR
2nd place, silver medalist(s)	Ryo Takayasu (JPN)	52.84	
3rd place, bronze medalist(s)	Wang Dong (CHN)	53.03	
4	Zhou Jiawei (CHN)	53.24	
5	Jeong Doo-hee (KOR)	53.94	
6	Daniel Bego (MAS)	54.44	
7	Stanislav Kuzmin (KAZ)	54.76	
8	Hsu Chi-chieh (TPE)	55.60	
