= 2002 Pan Pacific Swimming Championships – Men's 100 metre butterfly =

Men's 100 metre butterfly at the 2002 Pan Pacific Swimming Championships
- Venue: Yokohama International Swimming Pool
- Dates: August 28, 2002 (heats & semifinals); August 29, 2002 (final)
- Competitors: 25 from 13 nations
- Winning time: 52.45

Medalists
| gold medal | Ian Crocker | United States |
| silver medal | Geoff Huegill | Australia |
| bronze medal | Mike Mintenko | Canada |

The men's 100 metre butterfly competition at the 2002 Pan Pacific Swimming Championships took place on August 28–29 at the Yokohama International Swimming Pool. The last champion was Michael Klim of Australia.

This race consisted of two lengths of the pool, all in butterfly.

== Records ==
Prior to this competition, the existing world and Pan Pacific records were as follows:

| World record | Michael Klim (AUS) | 51.81 | Canberra, Australia | December 12, 1999 |
| Pan Pacific Championships record | Geoff Huegill (AUS) | 52.45 | Sydney, Australia | August 27, 1999 |

== Results ==
All times are in minutes and seconds.

| KEY: | q | Fastest non-qualifiers | Q | Qualified | CR | Championships record | NR | National record | PB | Personal best | SB | Seasonal best |

=== Heats ===
The first round was held on August 28.

| Rank | Heat | Lane | Name | Nationality | Time | Notes |
|---|---|---|---|---|---|---|
| 1 | 2 | 4 | Ian Crocker | United States | 52.52 | Q |
| 2 | 4 | 5 | Takashi Yamamoto | Japan | 53.02 | Q |
| 3 | 4 | 3 | Thomas Hannan | United States | 53.17 | Q |
| 4 | 3 | 3 | Kohei Kawamoto | Japan | 53.96 | Q |
| 5 | 2 | 5 | Adam Pine | Australia | 54.01 | Q |
| 6 | 3 | 6 | Tom Malchow | United States | 54.27 | Q |
| 7 | 2 | 3 | Jin Hao | China | 54.31 | Q |
| 8 | 3 | 5 | Mike Mintenko | Canada | 54.32 | Q |
| 9 | 2 | 6 | Hugo Duppré | Brazil | 54.74 | Q |
| 10 | 4 | 2 | Andrew Livingston | Puerto Rico | 54.78 | Q |
| 11 | 3 | 4 | Geoff Huegill | Australia | 54.86 | Q |
| 12 | 3 | 7 | Atsushi Nishikori | Japan | 54.96 | Q |
| 13 | 2 | 2 | Moss Burmester | New Zealand | 55.49 | Q |
| 14 | 3 | 2 | Heath Ramsay | Australia | 55.60 | Q |
| 15 | 4 | 1 | Juan Pablo Valdivieso | Peru | 55.61 | Q |
| 16 | 2 | 1 | Pedro Monteiro | Brazil | 55.67 | Q |
| 17 | 4 | 7 | Yu Kondo | Japan | 56.06 | |
| 18 | 4 | 6 | Ravil Nachaev | Uzbekistan | 56.27 | |
| 19 | 1 | 5 | Scott Talbot | New Zealand | 56.39 | |
| 20 | 2 | 7 | Mark Kwok Kin Ming | Hong Kong | 56.67 | |
| 21 | 4 | 8 | Jun Mark Chay Jung | Singapore | 56.77 | |
| 22 | 1 | 4 | Szeto Shui Ki | Hong Kong | 57.86 | |
| 23 | 2 | 8 | Ng Cheng Xun | Singapore | 58.43 | |
| 24 | 1 | 3 | Wong Kwok Kei | Hong Kong | 1:00.85 | |
| 25 | 1 | 6 | Dean Palacios | Northern Mariana Islands | 1:02.50 | |
| - | 3 | 1 | Dean Kent | New Zealand | DNS | |
| - | 3 | 8 | Aaron Ciarla | United States | DNS | |
| - | 4 | 4 | Michael Phelps | United States | DNS | |

=== Semifinals ===
The semifinals were held on August 28.

| Rank | Heat | Lane | Name | Nationality | Time | Notes |
|---|---|---|---|---|---|---|
| 1 | 2 | 4 | Ian Crocker | United States | 52.21 | Q, CR |
| 2 | 1 | 2 | Geoff Huegill | Australia | 52.38 | Q |
| 3 | 1 | 6 | Mike Mintenko | Canada | 52.61 | Q |
| 4 | 1 | 4 | Takashi Yamamoto | Japan | 52.64 | Q |
| 5 | 2 | 5 | Thomas Hannan | United States | 53.09 | Q |
| 6 | 2 | 3 | Adam Pine | Australia | 53.39 | Q |
| 7 | 1 | 5 | Kohei Kawamoto | Japan | 53.63 | Q |
| 8 | 1 | 3 | Tom Malchow | United States | 53.82 | Q |
| 9 | 2 | 6 | Jin Hao | China | 54.25 | |
| 10 | 2 | 2 | Hugo Duppré | Brazil | 54.63 | |
| 11 | 2 | 7 | Atsushi Nishikori | Japan | 55.01 | |
| 12 | 1 | 7 | Moss Burmester | New Zealand | 55.47 | |
| 13 | 1 | 8 | Yu Kondo | Japan | 55.78 | |
| 14 | 2 | 8 | Pedro Monteiro | Brazil | 55.91 | |
| 15 | 1 | 1 | Juan Pablo Valdivieso | Peru | 55.97 | |
| 16 | 2 | 1 | Heath Ramsay | Australia | 55.98 | |

=== Final ===
The final was held on August 29.

| Rank | Lane | Name | Nationality | Time | Notes |
|---|---|---|---|---|---|
| 1st place, gold medalist(s) | 4 | Ian Crocker | United States | 52.45 | |
| 2nd place, silver medalist(s) | 5 | Geoff Huegill | Australia | 52.48 | |
| 3rd place, bronze medalist(s) | 3 | Mike Mintenko | Canada | 52.69 | |
| 4 | 6 | Takashi Yamamoto | Japan | 52.88 | |
| 5 | 7 | Adam Pine | Australia | 52.97 | |
| 6 | 2 | Thomas Hannan | United States | 53.00 | |
| 7 | 1 | Kohei Kawamoto | Japan | 53.79 | |
| 8 | 8 | Jin Hao | China | 54.43 | |
