= Swimming at the 2005 Islamic Solidarity Games =

Swimming at the 2005 Islamic Solidarity Games was held in Swimming Pool of the General Presidency for Youth Welfare, King Abdullah Sport City, Jeddah, Saudi Arabia from April 9 to April 13, 2005.

== Medalists ==
Event	Gold	Silver	Bronze
50 m freestyle	Oleg Shteynikov; Kazakhstan	Vitaliy Khan; Kazakhstan	Mohamed Mamdouh; Egypt
100 m freestyle	Vitaliy Khan; Kazakhstan	Vyacheslav Titarenko; Kazakhstan	Abdelrahman Abubakr; Egypt
200 m freestyle	Daniel Bego; Malaysia	Serkan Aydın; Turkey	Vitaliy Khan; Kazakhstan
400 m freestyle	Daniel Bego; Malaysia	Aytekin Mindan; Turkey	Mohamed Al-Mitaiji; Tunisia
1500 m freestyle	Mohamed Magdy; Egypt	Naeem Al-Masri; Syria	Mohamed Al-Mitaiji; Tunisia
50 m backstroke	Stanislav Ossinskiy; Kazakhstan	Haitham Hazem; Egypt	Onan Thom; Guyana
100 m backstroke	Stanislav Ossinskiy; Kazakhstan	Haitham Hazem; Egypt	Anouar Ben Naceur; Tunisia
200 m backstroke	Dmitriy Gordiyenko; Kazakhstan	Stanislav Ossinskiy; Kazakhstan	Iurii Zakharov; Kyrgyzstan
50 m breaststroke	Ahmed Al-Kudmani; Saudi Arabia	Yevgeniy Ryzhkov; Kazakhstan	Ayman Khattab; Egypt
100 m breaststroke	Yevgeniy Oleinikov; Kazakhstan	Ahmed Al-Kudmani; Saudi Arabia	Ayman Khattab; Egypt
200 m breaststroke	Yevgeniy Ryzhkov; Kazakhstan	Ayman Khattab; Egypt	Ahmed Al-Kudmani; Saudi Arabia
50 m butterfly	Rustam Khudiyev; Kazakhstan	Ahmed Salah Abdou; Egypt	Ildar Gabdelmalikov; Kazakhstan
100 m butterfly	Rustam Khudiyev; Kazakhstan	Ahmed Salah Abdou; Egypt	Ildar Gabdelmalikov; Kazakhstan
200 m butterfly	Ahmed Salah Abdou; Egypt	Yevgeniy Oleinikov; Kazakhstan	Mohammed Al-Yousef; Saudi Arabia
200 m individual medley	Dmitriy Gordiyenko; Kazakhstan	Mehdi Hamama; Algeria	Iurii Zakharov; Kyrgyzstan
400 m individual medley	Mohamed Gadallah; Egypt	Mehdi Hamama; Algeria	Yevgeniy Oleinikov; Kazakhstan
4 × 100 m freestyle relay	Kazakhstan	Egypt	Algeria
4 × 200 m freestyle relay	Kazakhstan	Egypt	Tunisia
4 × 100 m medley relay	Kazakhstan	Egypt	Turkey

== Medal table ==
Rank	Nation	Gold	Silver	Bronze	Total
1	Kazakhstan (KAZ)	13	5	4	22
2	Egypt (EGY)	3	8	4	15
3	Malaysia (MAS)	2	0	0	2
4	Saudi Arabia (KSA)	1	1	2	4
5	Algeria (ALG)	0	2	1	3
5	Turkey (TUR)	0	2	1	3
7	Syria (SYR)	0	1	0	1
8	Tunisia (TUN)	0	0	4	4
9	Kyrgyzstan (KGZ)	0	0	2	2
10	Guyana (GUY)	0	0	1	1
Totals (10 entries)		19	19	19	57
