= Swimming at the 2002 Asian Games – Men's 100 metre butterfly =

Men's 100 metre butterfly at the 2002 Asian Games
- Venue: Sajik Swimming Pool
- Date: 3 October 2002
- Competitors: 25 from 17 nations

Medalists
| gold medal | Takashi Yamamoto | Japan |
| silver medal | Kohei Kawamoto | Japan |
| bronze medal | Jin Hao | China |

The men's 100 metre butterfly swimming competition at the 2002 Asian Games in Busan was held on 3 October at the Sajik Swimming Pool.

== Schedule ==
All times are Korea Standard Time (UTC+09:00)

| Date | Time | Event |
|---|---|---|
| Thursday, 3 October 2002 | 10:00 | Heats |
| Thursday, 3 October 2002 | 19:00 | Finals |

== Records ==
Prior to this competition, the existing world, Asian and Games records were as follows.

| World Record | Michael Klim (AUS) | 51.81 | Canberra, Australia | 12 December 1999 |
| Asian Record | Takashi Yamamoto (JPN) | 52.55 | Fukuoka, Japan | 25 July 2001 |
| Games Record | Takashi Yamamoto (JPN) | 53.34 | Bangkok, Thailand | 8 December 1998 |

== Results ==
Legend

- DNS — Did not start

=== Heats ===
| Rank | Heat | Athlete | Time | Notes |
|---|---|---|---|---|
| 1 | 3 | Kohei Kawamoto (JPN) | 53.22 | GR |
| 2 | 4 | Takashi Yamamoto (JPN) | 53.74 | |
| 3 | 4 | Ravil Nachaev (UZB) | 55.21 | |
| 4 | 2 | Jin Hao (CHN) | 55.43 | |
| 5 | 3 | Tang Wenjun (CHN) | 55.53 | |
| 6 | 3 | Yoo Jung-nam (KOR) | 55.61 | |
| 7 | 2 | Tseng Cheng-hua (TPE) | 56.01 | |
| 8 | 3 | Lubrey Lim (MAS) | 56.69 | |
| 9 | 2 | Mark Kwok (HKG) | 56.78 | |
| 10 | 3 | Charles Szeto (HKG) | 56.84 | |
| 11 | 4 | Kim Young-nam (KOR) | 57.03 | |
| 12 | 4 | Victor Wong (MAC) | 57.21 | |
| 13 | 2 | Mohammed Yamani (KSA) | 57.68 | |
| 14 | 4 | Ng Cheng Xun (SIN) | 57.83 | |
| 15 | 4 | Vyacheslav Titarenko (KAZ) | 57.93 | |
| 16 | 3 | Mohammed Al-Yousef (KSA) | 58.90 | |
| 17 | 2 | Tang Chon Kit (MAC) | 1:00.06 | |
| 18 | 4 | Zulfiqar Ali (PAK) | 1:01.18 | |
| 19 | 2 | Wael Ghassan (QAT) | 1:01.36 | |
| 20 | 2 | Trần Xuân Hiền (VIE) | 1:01.54 | |
| 21 | 1 | Rad Aweisat (PLE) | 1:03.99 | |
| 22 | 4 | François Ghattas (LIB) | 1:04.13 | |
| 23 | 1 | Bayar-Erdeniin Sonin-Erdene (MGL) | 1:04.43 | |
| 24 | 1 | Chuluunsükhiin Gansükh (MGL) | 1:04.56 | |
| — | 3 | Moyssara El-Aarag (QAT) | DNS | |

=== Finals ===
==== Final B ====
| Rank | Athlete | Time | Notes |
|---|---|---|---|
| 1 | Mark Kwok (HKG) | 56.04 | |
| 2 | Victor Wong (MAC) | 56.46 | |
| 3 | Charles Szeto (HKG) | 56.92 | |
| 4 | Kim Young-nam (KOR) | 57.38 | |
| 5 | Ng Cheng Xun (SIN) | 57.49 | |
| 6 | Mohammed Yamani (KSA) | 57.68 | |
| 7 | Vyacheslav Titarenko (KAZ) | 58.22 | |
| 8 | Mohammed Al-Yousef (KSA) | 58.81 | |

==== Final A ====
| Rank | Athlete | Time | Notes |
|---|---|---|---|
| 1st place, gold medalist(s) | Takashi Yamamoto (JPN) | 52.59 | GR |
| 2nd place, silver medalist(s) | Kohei Kawamoto (JPN) | 53.22 | |
| 3rd place, bronze medalist(s) | Jin Hao (CHN) | 53.56 | |
| 4 | Ravil Nachaev (UZB) | 55.00 | |
| 5 | Yoo Jung-nam (KOR) | 55.34 | |
| 6 | Tang Wenjun (CHN) | 55.61 | |
| 7 | Tseng Cheng-hua (TPE) | 55.63 | |
| 8 | Lubrey Lim (MAS) | 57.09 | |
