= Sze Hang-yu =

Hong Kong swimmer (born 1988)

Sze Hang-yu OLY
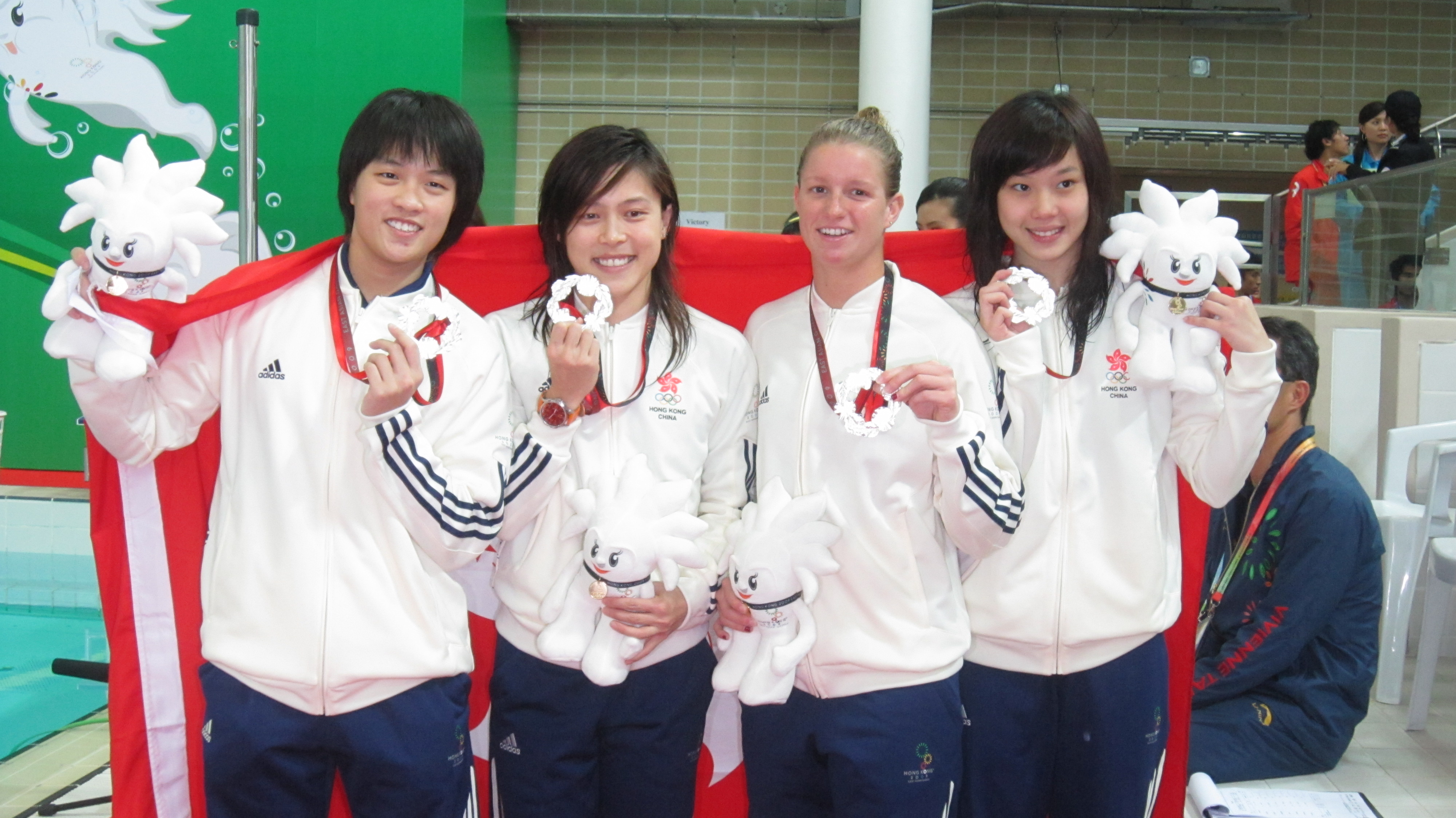
- Sze Hang-yu (left) at the 2009 East Asian Games

Personal information
- Full name: Rosanna SZE Hang-yu
- Nationality: Hong Kong
- Born: March 5, 1988 (age 38) Hong Kong
- Height: 1.68 m (5 ft 6 in)
- Weight: 63 kg (139 lb)

Sport
- Sport: Swimming
- Strokes: Freestyle, Butterfly
Medal record
Women's swimming
Representing Hong Kong
Asian Games
Silver medal – second place	2018 Jakarta	4×100 m medley
Bronze medal – third place	2006 Doha	4×100 m freestyle
Bronze medal – third place	2010 Guangzhou	4×100 m medley
Bronze medal – third place	2010 Guangzhou	4×100 m freestyle
Bronze medal – third place	2014 Incheon	4×100 m medley
Bronze medal – third place	2014 Incheon	4×100 m freestyle
Bronze medal – third place	2014 Incheon	4×200 m freestyle
Bronze medal – third place	2018 Jakarta	4×100 m freestyle
Bronze medal – third place	2018 Jakarta	4×200 m freestyle
Asian Championships
Silver medal – second place	2009 Foshan	4×100 m freestyle
Silver medal – second place	2012 Dubai	100 m butterfly
Bronze medal – third place	2006 Singapore	4×100 m medley
Bronze medal – third place	2009 Foshan	4×100 m medley
Bronze medal – third place	2009 Foshan	4×200 m freestyle
Bronze medal – third place	2012 Dubai	200 m freestyle
Bronze medal – third place	2012 Dubai	50 m butterfly
Bronze medal – third place	2012 Dubai	4×100 m freestyle
Bronze medal – third place	2012 Dubai	4×200 m freestyle
Bronze medal – third place	2012 Dubai	4×100 m medley
Bronze medal – third place	2016 Tokyo	4×100 m medley
Bronze medal – third place	2016 Tokyo	4×100 m freestyle
Bronze medal – third place	2016 Tokyo	4×200 m freestyle
Asian Indoor and Martial Arts Games
Gold medal – first place	2005 Bangkok	50 m freestyle
Gold medal – first place	2005 Bangkok	50 m butterfly
Gold medal – first place	2005 Bangkok	100 m medley
Gold medal – first place	2005 Bangkok	4 × 25 m freestyle
Gold medal – first place	2005 Bangkok	4 × 50 m freestyle
Gold medal – first place	2005 Bangkok	4 × 25 m medley
Gold medal – first place	2005 Bangkok	4 × 50 m medley
Gold medal – first place	2007 Macau	50 m butterfly
Gold medal – first place	2007 Macau	4 × 50 m freestyle
Gold medal – first place	2007 Macau	4 × 100 m freestyle
Gold medal – first place	2007 Macau	4 × 50 m medley
Gold medal – first place	2009 Hanoi	4 × 100 m freestyle
Gold medal – first place	2009 Hanoi	4 × 50 m medley
Gold medal – first place	2009 Hanoi	4 × 100 m medley
Gold medal – first place	2017 Ashgabat	4 × 50 m medley
Gold medal – first place	2017 Ashgabat	4 × 100 m medley
Silver medal – second place	2005 Bangkok	100 m butterfly
Silver medal – second place	2005 Bangkok	4 × 100 m freestyle
Silver medal – second place	2005 Bangkok	4 × 50 m medley
Silver medal – second place	2007 Macau	50 m freestyle
Silver medal – second place	2007 Macau	100 m butterfly
Silver medal – second place	2007 Macau	100 m medley
Silver medal – second place	2009 Hanoi	50 m freestyle
Silver medal – second place	2009 Hanoi	100 m freestyle
Silver medal – second place	2009 Hanoi	100 m butterfly
Silver medal – second place	2009 Hanoi	4 × 50 m freestyle
Silver medal – second place	2013 Incheon	50 m freestyle
Silver medal – second place	2017 Ashgabat	100 m freestyle
Silver medal – second place	2017 Ashgabat	4 × 50 m freestyle
Silver medal – second place	2017 Ashgabat	4 × 100 m freestyle
Bronze medal – third place	2005 Bangkok	100 m freestyle
Bronze medal – third place	2013 Incheon	100 m butterfly
Bronze medal – third place	2013 Incheon	100 m medley
Bronze medal – third place	2013 Incheon	4 × 50 m freestyle
Bronze medal – third place	2013 Incheon	4 × 100 m freestyle
Bronze medal – third place	2013 Incheon	4 × 50 m medley
Bronze medal – third place	2013 Incheon	4 × 100 m medley

Rosanna Sze Hang-yu (Chinese: 施幸余; Jyutping: si^{1} hang^{6} jyu^{4}) is an Olympic swimmer from Hong Kong and record holder of 9 Hong Kong Swimming Records, plus former holder of 16 HK records. She has broken Hong Kong records for 108 times across 19 years (2002-2021), showing her longevity in the sport.

She has swum for Hong Kong at the Olympics (2004, 2012, 2016), Long Course World Championship (2003, 2005, 2007, 2009, 2011, 2013, 2015 and 2017), Short Course World Championship (2004, 2006, 2010, 2012, 2016, 2018, 2021 and 2022) and Asian Games (2006, 2010, 2014, 2018), among other international events.

At the 2012 Summer Olympics she finished 20th overall in the Women's 200 Freestyle and failed to reach the semifinals.
