= You Seung-hun =

South Korean swimmer (born 1983)

Yoo Seung-hun
Personal information
- Full name: Yoo Seung-hun
- National team: South Korea
- Born: 28 June 1983 (age 43)
- Height: 1.79 m (5 ft 10 in)
- Weight: 79 kg (174 lb)

Korean name
- Hangul: 유승현
- RR: Yu Seunghyeon
- MR: Yu Sŭnghyŏn

Sport
- Sport: Swimming
- Strokes: Breaststroke
Medal record
Men's swimming
Representing South Korea
Asian Games
Bronze medal – third place	2006 Doha	4×100 m medley

Yoo Seung-hun (Korean: 유승현; born June 28, 1983) is a South Korean former swimmer, who specialized in breaststroke events. He shared bronze medals with Sung Min, Jeong Doo-Hee, and Park Tae-Hwan in the 4 × 100 m medley relay (3:41.33) at the 2006 Asian Games in Doha, Qatar.

You qualified for the men's 100 m breaststroke at the 2004 Summer Olympics in Athens, by clearing a FINA B-standard entry time of 1:04.28 from the Dong-A Swimming Tournament in Seoul. He set a South Korean record and a personal best of 1:03.56 to lead the third heat by 0.28 of a second ahead of Chinese Taipei's Chen Cho-Yi. You failed to advance into the semifinals, as he placed thirty-first overall on the first day of preliminaries.
