= Short course swimming at the Asian Indoor and Martial Arts Games =

Student

Short course swimming has been a sport at every Asian Indoor and Martial Arts Games.

== Summary ==
Games	Year	Host city	Events	Best nation
I	2005	Bangkok, Thailand	40	Kazakhstan
II	2007	Macau, China	30	Hong Kong
III	2009	Hanoi, Vietnam	30	Kazakhstan
IV	2013	Incheon, South Korea	30	China
V	2017	Ashgabat, Turkmenistan	30	China
VI	2021	Bangkok-Chonburi, Thailand	30	

== Events ==
=== Men's events ===
Event	05	07	09	13	17	21	Games
50 metre freestyle	•	•	•	•	•	•	6
100 metre freestyle	•	•	•	•	•	•	6
200 metre freestyle	•	•	•	•	•	•	6
50 metre backstroke	•	•	•	•	•	•	6
100 metre backstroke	•	•	•	•	•	•	6
200 metre backstroke	•						1
50 metre breaststroke	•	•	•	•	•	•	6
100 metre breaststroke	•	•	•	•	•	•	6
200 metre breaststroke	•						1
50 metre butterfly	•	•	•	•	•	•	6
100 metre butterfly	•	•	•	•	•	•	6
200 metre butterfly	•						1
100 metre individual medley	•	•	•	•	•	•	6
200 metre individual medley	•	•	•	•	•	•	6
4 × 25 metre freestyle relay	•						1
4 × 50 metre freestyle relay	•	•	•	•	•	•	6
4 × 100 metre freestyle relay	•	•	•	•	•	•	6
4 × 25 metre medley relay	•						1
4 × 50 metre medley relay	•	•	•	•	•	•	6
4 × 100 metre medley relay	•	•	•	•	•	•	6
Events	40	30	30	30	30	30	

=== Women's events ===
Event	05	07	09	13	17	21	Games
50 metre freestyle	•	•	•	•	•	•	6
100 metre freestyle	•	•	•	•	•	•	6
200 metre freestyle	•	•	•	•	•	•	6
50 metre backstroke	•	•	•	•	•	•	6
100 metre backstroke	•	•	•	•	•	•	6
200 metre backstroke	•						1
50 metre breaststroke	•	•	•	•	•	•	6
100 metre breaststroke	•	•	•	•	•	•	6
200 metre breaststroke	•						1
50 metre butterfly	•	•	•	•	•	•	6
100 metre butterfly	•	•	•	•	•	•	6
200 metre butterfly	•						1
100 metre individual medley	•	•	•	•	•	•	6
200 metre individual medley	•	•	•	•	•	•	6
4 × 25 metre freestyle relay	•						1
4 × 50 metre freestyle relay	•	•	•	•	•	•	6
4 × 100 metre freestyle relay	•	•	•	•	•	•	6
4 × 25 metre medley relay	•						1
4 × 50 metre medley relay	•	•	•	•	•	•	6
4 × 100 metre medley relay	•	•	•	•	•	•	6
Events	40	30	30	30	30	30	

== Medal table ==
Rank	Nation	Gold	Silver	Bronze	Total
1	China (CHN)	52	33	19	104
2	Kazakhstan (KAZ)	31	29	25	85
3	Hong Kong (HKG)	28	25	28	81
4	South Korea (KOR)	19	20	26	65
5	Thailand (THA)	10	14	25	49
6	Chinese Taipei (TPE)	8	9	9	26
7	Uzbekistan (UZB)	4	11	11	26
8	Vietnam (VIE)	4	5	6	15
9	Macau (MAC)	2	4	4	10
10	India (IND)	1	5	4	10
11	Iran (IRI)	1	1	1	3
12	Singapore (SIN)	0	3	2	5
13	Indonesia (INA)	0	2	1	3
14	Kyrgyzstan (KGZ)	0	1	1	2
15	Philippines (PHI)	0	1	0	1
Totals (15 entries)		160	163	162	485
