= Liu Jing (swimmer) =

Chinese swimmer (born 1990)

LIU Jing
Personal information
- Full name: Liu Jing
- Nationality: China
- Born: March 8, 1990 (age 36) Beijing, China
- Height: 172 cm (5 ft 8 in)
- Weight: 63 kg (139 lb)

Sport
- Sport: Swimming
- Strokes: Individual medley
Medal record
World Championships (LC)
Gold medal – first place	2009 Rome	4×200 m freestyle
Bronze medal – third place	2011 Shanghai	4×200 m freestyle
World Championships (SC)
Gold medal – first place	2010 Dubai	4×200 m freestyle
Asian Championships
Gold medal – first place	2009 Foshan	400m IM
Silver medal – second place	2009 Foshan	200m IM
Summer Universiade
Bronze medal – third place	2011 Shenzhen	200 m medley
Bronze medal – third place	2011 Shenzhen	4×100 m freestyle
Bronze medal – third place	2011 Shenzhen	4×200 m freestyle

Liu Jing (simplified Chinese: 刘京; traditional Chinese: 劉京; pinyin: Liú Jīng; born March 8, 1990, in Beijing) is a Chinese swimmer, who competed for Team China at the 2008 and 2012 Summer Olympics. Her brother, Liu Yuchen, is a badminton player.

== Major achievements ==
- 2003 National Intercity Games preliminaries - 1st 400m IM;
- 2003/2005/2006 National Championships - 3rd 400m IM/2nd 200m IM/2nd 400m IM;
- 2003 National Short-Course Championships - 4th 400m IM;
- 2004 World Cup - 2nd 400m medley;
- 2005 Mare Nostrum 2005 series - 1st 200m/400m IM;
- 2007 National Intercity Games - 1st 4 × 200 m free relay, 2nd 200m IM
- 2008 Olympics - 25th 400m IM
- 2009 Asian Swimming Championships - 2nd 200m IM, 1st 400m IM

== See also ==
- China at the 2012 Summer Olympics - Swimming
