= Jin Hao (swimmer) =

Chinese swimmer (born 1979)

Personal information
- Native name: 金浩
- Born: 6 February 1979 (age 47) Zaozhuang, China
- Height: 188 cm (6 ft 2 in)
- Weight: 80 kg (176 lb)

Chinese name
- Chinese: 金浩
Transcriptions
Standard Mandarin
- Hanyu Pinyin: Jīn Hào
Yue: Cantonese
- Jyutping: gam^{1} hou^{6}

Sport
- Sport: Swimming
- Strokes: butterfly
Medal record
Men's swimming
Representing China
Asian Games
Bronze medal – third place	2002 Busan	100m butterfly

Jin Hao (Chinese: 金浩; born 6 February 1979) is a Chinese swimming coach and former swimmer. He competed in the 2000 Summer Olympics and was a bronze medalist for the 100 metre butterfly at the 2002 Asian Games.

== Career ==
Jin is from Zaozhuang, Shandong. He competed at the 1997 National Games of China, where he was a gold medalist. Shijun Diao of the magazine Chunqiu Birmonthly called Jin "swimming prince" in a 1998 profile. Jin competed at the 2000 Summer Olympics in three events: men's 400 metre freestyle, men's 1500 metre freestyle, and men's 400 metre individual medley, where he ranked 25, 32, and 25, respectively.

Through her lawyer Lin Yaoqiang, the Shanghai woman referee Chen Xia accused Jin and three fellow Shandong swimming team teammates of kicking her to the floor and assaulting her on 15 October 2000, during the Chinese National Swimming Championships, causing her to be hospitalised for cerebral hematoma. According to Lin, they attacked her after she called a security guard to help after they cornered chief referee Dou Xuanguan when he told them they were disqualified from the competition for not registering in time. Owing to the incident, the swimming division of the General Administration of Sport of China suspended Jin and another teammate from competitions between 14 October 2000 and 14 April 2001 and suspended two other teammates for one year. In an interview in October 2001, Jin said the half-year suspension he received was unfair because it was another teammate who assaulted Chen, not he.

During the 2001 National Games of China, he completed in eight events, the most of any participant that year. The events he competed in were the 400 metres freestyle, 400 metres medley, 200 metres freestyle, 100 metres freestyle, 200 metres medley, 200 metres butterfly, 1500 metres freestyle, and mixed 4 × 100 metre medley relay. In seven individual events and one team event, Jin competed 22 times, the most of all participants. Thrice breaking the national record, he received one gold medal, three silver medals, and one bronze medal, contributing 76 points to the Shandong team. His achievements during the National Games prompted the Qilu Evening News to call him the "scoring king" of the Games' swimming competitions. After eight days of competition, Jin had lost 4 kilograms (8.8 lb). At the 2002 Asian Games, he was a bronze medalist for the 100 metre butterfly. At the men's 4 × 100 metre freestyle relay event, Jin and his teammates received the gold medal and with a time of three minutes and 21.07 seconds, breaking the previous Asian Games record set by the Japanese team by almost a second.

By 2005, he was a Shandong Sport University swimming coach. He said that being a coach was a lot more exhausting than being an athlete owing to having to attend to athletes' needs and there being more things he has to take into consideration. He considered himself retired from competing in the sport, but Shandong asked him to compete in the 2005 National Games of China, giving him two months to get ready. At the competition, he received the bronze medal for the 100 metre butterfly. In an interview, he said, "Winning the bronze medal does not show how strong I am, but that China's overall strength in this event is really poor."

Jin coached the swimmer Xin Xin who received a gold medal for the women's 10 km open water swimming event at the 2019 World Aquatics Championships. She was China's first gold medalist in open water swimming at the FINA World Championships. Jin was a Shandong swimming coach during the 25th Provincial Games in Shandong Province held in 2022 and was a member of the coaching team that determined which athletes should be chosen to join the provincial team to train for the National Games.
