= Lyashko =

Lyashko or Liashko (Ukrainian: Ляшко) is a gender-neutral Ukrainian surname that may refer to

- Oleg Lyashko (swimmer) (born 1982), Uzbekistani swimmer
- Oleh Lyashko (born 1972), Ukrainian politician
  - Radical Party of Oleh Lyashko
- Oleksandr Liashko (1915–2002), Ukrainian politician
