= Ha Sinan =

Chinese swimmer

Personal information
- Born: January 10, 1992 (age 34) Kunming, Yunnan

Sport
- Sport: Swimming
Medal record
Representing China
Asian Championships
| Gold medal – first place | 2009 Foshan | 4x200m freestyle relay |

Ha Sinan (born 10 January 1992) is a swimmer from China. She is listed as a member of China's team at the 2008 Olympics; however, she appears to have not swum at the Games.

== Major achievements ==
- 2009 Asian Swimming Championships - 1st 4x200 Free Relay
