= Wang Dong (swimmer) =

Chinese swimmer

Personal information
- Full name: Wang Dong
- Nationality: China
- Born: 4 February 1986 (age 40)
- Height: 1.84 m (6 ft 0 in)
- Weight: 78 kg (172 lb)

Sport
- Sport: Swimming
- Strokes: Butterfly
Medal record
Men's swimming
Representing China
Asian Games
Silver medal – second place	2006 Doha	4×100 m medley
Bronze medal – third place	2006 Doha	50 m butterfly
Bronze medal – third place	2006 Doha	100 m butterfly
Asian Championships
Gold medal – first place	2006 Singapore	100 m butterfly
Gold medal – first place	2006 Singapore	4×100 m medley

Wang Dong (born 4 February 1986) is a Chinese butterfly swimmer.

== Career ==
At the 2006 Asian Swimming Championships in Singapore, Wang won two gold medals. In the 100 metre butterfly event he won gold in 53.92 and with Ouyang Kunpeng, Xie Zhi and Huang Shaohua won gold in the 4×100 metre medley relay in a new championship record time of 3:42.04.

One month later at the 2006 World Short Course Championships in Shanghai, Wang finished 16th in the 50 metre butterfly equal 28th in the 100 metre butterfly and in the final of the 4 × 100 metre medley relay the Chinese quartet of Wang, Ouyang Kunpeng, Xie Zhi and Huang Shaohua initially finished in 5th place with a time 3:31.73, but were later disqualified.

In December 2006, at the 2006 Asian Games in Doha, Wang won three medals. He won bronze in both the 50 m and 100 m butterfly and with Ouyang Kunpeng, Lai Zhongjian and Chen Zuo won silver in the 4 × 100 metre medley relay.

The following year at the 2007 World Aquatics Championships, Wang finished 31st in the 50 metre butterfly, 27th in the 100 metre butterfly, and with Ouyang Kunpeng, Lai Zhongjian and Chen Zuo finished 13th in 4 × 100 metre medley relay.
