= Qilu Evening News =

Chinese daily broadsheet newspaper

- Native name: 齐鲁晚报
- Type: Daily newspaper
- Format: Broadsheet
- Publisher: Dazhong Press Group
- Founded: 1 January 1988
- Language: Chinese
- Circulation: 1.67 million
- OCLC number: 123259323
- Website: www.qlwb.com.cn

The Qilu Evening News (simplified Chinese: 齐鲁晚报; traditional Chinese: 齊魯晚報; pinyin: Qílǔ Wǎnbào), based in Jinan, Shandong Province, People's Republic of China, is a daily broadsheet newspaper. It is one of the most circulated newspapers in the world according to China Daily; the newspaper has a circulation of 1.67 million, making it the fifth most widely circulated daily newspaper in China.

The Qilu Evening News was founded on 1 January 1988, and its masthead (logo in the case of the online edition) was written in Chinese calligraphy by former paramount leader Deng Xiaoping. It is currently published by Dazhong Press Group (大众报业集团), which as of 2011 published eleven other Chinese newspapers. According to the company's official biography, its brand was worth 2.896 billion yuan (US$0.45 billion) in 2011.
