= 2009 Asian Swimming Championships =

International swimming competition

8th Asian Swimming Championships
- Host city: Foshan, China
- Date: November 25 – 28, 2009
- Venue: 1

The 8th Asian Swimming Championships were held November 25–28, 2009 in Foshan, China. It featured 38 different events (19 male, 19 female), all of which were contested in a 50m (long course) pool.

== Participating countries ==
174 swimmers (102 males, 72 females) from 15 countries swam at the Championships. Teams were from:

- Bahrain (2) (2 males)
- China (46) (21 m, 25 f)
- Chinese Taipei (15) (8 m, 7 f)
- Hong Kong (33) (16 m, 17 f)
- India (8) (8 males)
- Japan (28) (14 m, 14 f)
- Jordan (4) (3 m, 1 f)
- Kuwait (3) (3 males)
- Lebanon (2) (2 males)
- Macau (8) (5 m, 3 f)
- Oman (3) (3 males)
- Palestine (2) (2 males)
- Saudi Arabia (4) (4 males)
- Singapore (4) (3 m, 1 f)
- Uzbekistan (12) (8 m, 4 f)

== Event schedule ==
Date	November 25, 2009	November 26, 2009	November 27, 2009	November 28, 2009
E v e n t s	50 breast (m); 50 back (w); 100 fly (m); 200 fly (w); 200 free (m); 100 free (w); 400 IM (m); 400 IM (w); 400 Medley Relay (m); 800 Free Relay (w)	50 fly (w); 50 fly (m); 50 free (w); 100 breast (m); 200 breast (w); 400 free (m); 200 free (w); 200 back (m); 100 back (w); 800 Free Relay (m)	50 back (m); 100 fly (w); 200 fly (m); 400 free (w); 100 free (m); 100 breast (w); 200 breast (m); 400 Free Relay (w); 1500 free (m)	50 breast (w); 50 free (m); 200 IM (w); 200 IM (m); 200 back (w); 100 back (m); 400 Medley Relay (w); 400 Free Relay (m); 800 free (w)

Prelims (morning) sessions began at 9:00 a.m., Finals (evening) sessions began at 7:30 p.m.

== Swimming Results ==
=== Men ===
Event	Gold		Silver		Bronze	
50m freestyle	CAI Li; China	22.55; CR	Lü Zhiwu; China	22.58	Virdhawal Khade; India	22.67
100m freestyle	Lü Zhiwu; China	49.64; CR	Virdhawal Khade; India	49.69	Daniil Tulupov; Uzbekistan	49.99
200m freestyle	ZHANG Lin; China	1:48.88; CR	SHI Tengfei; China	1:49.15	Aaron D'Souza; India	1:50.70
400m freestyle	SUN Yang; China	3:49.86; CR	LI Yunqi; China	3:53.18	Jumpei Higashi; Japan	3:54.12
1500m freestyle	SUN Yang; China	14:57.33; CR	LI Yunqi; China	15:33.79	Jumpei Higashi; Japan	15:35.13
50m backstroke	Nobuhiro Toyada; Japan	26.15	Kosuke Hagino; Japan	26.17	Danil Bugakov; Uzbekistan	26.40
100m backstroke	HE Jianbin; China	54.84	Nobuhiro Toyada; Japan	56.23	Takahiro Yamazaki; Japan	56.69
200m backstroke	Takahiro Yamazaki; Japan	2:01.48	ZHANG Yu; China	2:01.92	Nobuhiro Toyada; Japan	2:02.00
50m breaststroke	Parker Lam; Singapore	28.03; CR	WANG Shuai; China	28.22	WONG Chun Yan; Hong Kong	28.33
100m breaststroke	WANG Shuai; China	1:01.26; CR	ZHANG Guoying; China	1:01.79	Sandeep Sejwal; India	1:01.90
200m breaststroke	Akihiro Yamaguchi; Japan	2:13.56; CR	Yukihiro Takahashi; Japan	2:14.90	Sandeep Sejwal; India	2:14.99
50m butterfly	SHI Feng; China	23.76; CR	ZHOU Jiawei; China	23.96	Virdhawal Khade; India	24.14
100m butterfly	ZHOU Jiawei; China	52.04; CR	SHI Feng; China	52.36	Hirofumi Ikebata; Japan	53.08
200m butterfly	WU Peng; China	1:56.71; CR	CHEN Yin; China	1:57.38	Hsu Chi Chieh; Chinese Taipei	1:57.83
200m I.M.	Kosuke Hagino; Japan	2:01.43	LIU Weijia; China	2:01.86	SUN Han; China	2:04.04
400m I.M.	Daiya Seto; Japan	4:20.56	LIU Weijia; China	4:21.86	Keita Sameshima; Japan	4:25.40
4 × 100 m freestyle relay	China; SHI Tengfei, BAN Bao, XIN Tong, HE Jianbin	3:20.28; CR	Hong Kong; Jeffrey Lum, NG Chun Nam, KONG Chun Yin, David Wong	3:21.25	Uzbekistan; Daniil Tulupov, Dmitriy Shvetsov, Petr Romashkin, Danil Bugakov	3:22.83
4 × 200 m freestyle relay	China; BAN Bao, LI Yunqi, SUN Yang, SHI Tengfei	7:21.94; CR	Japan; Takashi Koike, Kosuke Hagino, Shinri Shioura, Jumpei Higashi	7:25.79	Hong Kong; Kent Cheung, NG Chun Nam, Jeffrey Lum, David Wong	7:28.80
4 × 100 m medley relay	China; CHENG Feiyi, ZHANG Guoying, SHI Feng, Lü Zhiwu	3:38.26; CR	Japan; Nobuhiro Toyada, Ryuta Tani, Yuta Kimura, Shinri Shioura	3:43.41	India; Rehan Poncha, Sandeep Sejwal, Aaron D'Souza, Virdhawal Khade	3:45.53

=== Women ===
Event	Gold		Silver		Bronze	
50m freestyle	LI Zhesi; China	25.18	TANG Yi; China	25.40	Shiori Kaneko; Japan	26.36
100m freestyle	LI Zhesi; China	54.84; CR	TANG Yi; China	54.88	Masako Kuroki; Japan	57.02
200m freestyle	LIU Jing; China	1:58.76; CR	TANG Yi; China	2:00.52	Risa Sekine; Japan	2:00.70
400m freestyle	TAN Miao; China	4:13.70	REN Junni; China	4:14.87	YANG Chin Kuei; Chinese Taipei	4:15.91
800m freestyle	TAN Miao; China	8:40.55	REN Junni; China	8:41.14	Mako Kuramatsu; Japan	8:48.10
50m backstroke	GAO Chang; China	27.38; CR	ZHAO Jing; China	27.77	Sherry Tsai; Hong Kong	28.93
100m backstroke	GAO Chang; China	59.96; CR	ZHAO Jing; China	1:00.39	Mai Harada; Japan	1:01.27
200m backstroke	BAI Anqi; China	2:09.96	Sayaka Akase; Japan	2:12.22	Marie Kamimura; Japan	2:13.70
50m breaststroke	CHEN Huijia; China	31.37; CR	Kana Sugisaki; Japan	31.92	WANG Randi; China	32.06
100m breaststroke	CHEN Huijia; China	1:07.77; CR	Keiko Fukudome; Japan	1:07.90	Yvette Kong; Hong Kong	1:08.43
200m breaststroke	SUN Ye; China	2:25.37; CR	Keiko Fukudome; Japan	2:25.46	CHENG Wan Jung; Chinese Taipei	2:31.57
50m butterfly	JIAO Liuyang; China	26.09; CR	HONG Wenwen; China	26.41	Rino Hosoda; Japan	26.90
100m butterfly	JIAO Liuyang; China	57.12; CR	GUO Fan; China	58.41	Rino Hosoda; Japan	59.33
200m butterfly	LIU Zige; China	2:06.23; CR	JIAO Liuyang; China	2:09.48	Natsuki Akiyama; Japan	2:10.31
200m I.M.	CHENG Wan Jung; Chinese Taipei	2:12.55; CR	LIU Jing; China	2:13.23	Emi Takabatake; Japan	2:14.65
400m I.M.	LIU Jing; China	4:41.29; CR	CHENG Wan Jung; Chinese Taipei	4:43.16	Emi Takabatake; Japan	4:44.86
4 × 100 m Freestyle Relay	China; GUO Fan, ZHANG Jiaqi, LI Jiaxing, ZHENG Rongrong	3:43.30; CR	Hong Kong; SZE Hang Yu, YU Wai Ting, Yvette Kong, Sherry Tsai	3:45.71	Japan; Masako Kuroki, Shiori Kaneko, Emi Takabatake, Risa Sekine	3:45.92
4 × 200 m Freestyle Relay	China; WANG Xinyu, REN Junni, GUO Junjun, HA Sinan	8:09.01; CR	Japan; Risa Sekine, Natsuki Akiyama, Haruka Miyazwa, Masako Kuroki	8:14.44	Hong Kong; SZE Hang Yu, Natasha Tang, Jennifer Town, Yvette Kong	8:17.68
4 × 100 m Medley Relay	China; XU Tian Longzi, SUN Ye, HONG Wenwen, YU Yao	4:02.86; CR	Japan; Mai Harada, Keiko Fukudome, Rino Hosoda, Masako Kuroki	4:06.68	Hong Kong; Sherry Tsai, Yvette Kong, CHAN Kin Lok, SZE Hang Yu	4:10.54

=== Swimming Medal Table ===
Rank	Nation	Gold	Silver	Bronze	Total
1	China (CHN)	31	23	2	56
2	Japan (JPN)	5	11	18	34
3	Chinese Taipei (TPE)	1	1	3	5
4	Singapore (SIN)	1	0	0	1
5	Hong Kong (HKG)	0	2	6	8
6	India (IND)	0	1	6	7
7	Uzbekistan (UZB)	0	0	3	3
Totals (7 entries)		38	38	38	114

== Synchronised Swimming ==
=== Synchronised Swimming Medal Table ===
Rank	Nation	Gold	Silver	Bronze	Total
1	China (CHN)	5	2	0	7
2	Japan (JPN)	2	1	0	3
3	Macau (MAC)	0	2	2	4
4	Uzbekistan (UZB)	0	1	4	5
5	Malaysia (MAS)	0	1	0	1
6	Hong Kong (HKG)	0	0	1	1
Totals (6 entries)		7	7	7	21
