= Kohei Kawamoto =

Japanese swimmer (born 1979)

Personal information
- Full name: Kohei Kawamoto
- Nationality: Japan
- Born: October 6, 1979 (age 47) Kashiwazaki, Niigata
- Height: 177 cm (70 in)
- Weight: 70 kg (154 lb)

Sport
- Sport: Swimming
- Strokes: butterfly
- Club: NSP / The Race Club / Phoenix Swim Club
- College team: Chuo University of Japan
Medal record
Summer Universiade
Gold medal – first place	2001 Beijing	50m Butterfly
Bronze medal – third place	2001 Beijing	100m Butterfly
Asian Games
Gold medal – first place	2002 Busan	100m Butterfly

Kohei Kawamoto (河本 耕平, Kawamoto Kōhei; born October 6, 1979 in Kashiwazaki, Niigata) is a butterfly swimmer from Japan. He won gold medals at the 2001 Summer Universiade.

== Personal bests ==
In long course swim pools Kawamoto's bests are:

- Japanese record holder of 100m butterfly at 51.00.
- 14 times Asian and Japanese records.
- 2 times World Cup champion of butterfly (2006, 2010).
- 50m butterfly: 23.46 (October 25, 2009, LCM)
- 100m butterfly: 51.00 Asian, Japanese record (September 11, 2009, LCM)
