= Vyacheslav Titarenko =

Kazakhstani swimmer (born 1978)

Personal information
- Full name: Vyacheslav Vladimirovich Titarenko
- National team: Kazakhstan
- Born: 8 June 1978 (age 48) Karaganda, Kazakh SSR, Soviet Union
- Height: 1.72 m (5 ft 8 in)
- Weight: 71 kg (157 lb)

Sport
- Sport: Swimming
- Strokes: Butterfly, freestyle
Medal record
Men's swimming
Representing Kazakhstan
Islamic Solidarity Games
Silver medal – second place	2005 Jeddah	100 m freestyle

Vyacheslav Vladimirovich Titarenko (Kazakh: Вячеслав Владимирович Титаренко; born June 8, 1978) is a Kazakh former swimmer, who specialized in sprint freestyle events. He is a single-time Olympian (2004), and a top 16 finalist in the 100 m butterfly at the 2002 Asian Games in Busan, South Korea (58.22).

Titarenko qualified for the men's 100 m freestyle, as Kazakhstan's oldest swimmer (aged 26), at the 2004 Summer Olympics in Athens. He achieved a FINA B-standard of 51.91 from the Kazakhstan Open Championships in Almaty. He challenged seven other swimmers in heat three, including five-time Olympian Carl Probert of Fiji. He raced to sixth place in 52.09, just 0.18 of a second off his entry time. Titarenko failed to advance into the semifinals, as he placed fifty-first overall out of 71 swimmers in the preliminaries.
