= Shi Haoran =

Chinese swimmer

Personal information
- Born: May 13, 1990 (age 36) Wenzhou, Zhejiang

Sport
- Sport: Swimming

Shi Haoran (born May 13, 1990) is a Chinese swimmer who competed for Team China at the 2008 Summer Olympics.

== Major achievements ==
- 2007 National Intercity Games - 3rd 200 m free
