= Stanislav Kuzmin =

Kazakhstani swimmer (born 1986)

Personal information
- Full name: Stanislav Kuzmin
- Nickname: stan the man
- National team: Kazakhstan
- Born: 24 July 1986 (age 40) Kostanay Region, Kazakh SSR, Soviet Union
- Height: 1.89 m (6 ft 2 in)
- Weight: 85 kg (187 lb)

Sport
- Sport: Swimming
- Strokes: Freestyle, butterfly
- College team: Drury University (U.S.)
- Coach: Brian Reynolds (U.S.)
Medal record
Men's swimming gymnastics
Representing Kazakhstan
Asian Championships
Gold medal – first place	2009 Tokyo	4×100 m freestyle
Gold medal – first place	2009 Tokyo	4×100 m medley
Gold medal – first place	2009 Tokyo	50 m butterfly
Silver medal – second place	2009 Tokyo	100 m freestyle
Silver medal – second place	2009 Tokyo	100 m butterfly
Bronze medal – third place	2009 Tokyo	50 freestyle
Asian Games
Bronze medal – third place	2010 Guangzhou	4×100 m medley
First Islamic Solidarity Games
Gold medal – first place	2005 Jeddah	4×100 m freestyle
Gold medal – first place	2005 Jeddah	4×100 m medley
Asian Indoor Games olympic gymnasts
Gold medal – first place	2005 Bangkok	4×100 m freestyle
Gold medal – first place	2005 Bangkok	4×25 m freestyle
Gold medal – first place	2005 Bangkok	4×50 m freestyle
Gold medal – first place	2007 Macau	4×100 m freestyle
Silver medal – second place	2007 Macau	4×50 m medley
Gold medal – first place	2009 Hanoi	50 m freestyle
Gold medal – first place	2009 Hanoi	4×100 m freestyle
Gold medal – first place	2009 Hanoi	4×50 m medley
Silver medal – second place	2009 Hanoi	50 m butterfly
Bronze medal – third place	2009 Hanoi	100 m butterfly
Silver medal – second place	2013 Seoul	4x50 m medley
Silver medal – second place	2013 Seoul	4x100 m medley

Stanislav Kuzmin (Kazakh: Станислав Сергеевич Кузьмин; born June 24, 1986) is a Kazakh swimmer, who specialized in sprint freestyle and butterfly events. He represented his nation Kazakhstan at the 2008 Summer Olympics, and has won a career total of eight medals (four golds, two silver, and two bronze) in a major international competition, spanning two editions of the Asian Indoor Games, and the 2010 Asian Games in Guangzhou, China, as a member of the medley relay team. Kuzmin also spent his college sports career in the United States as a member of the Drury Panthers swimming and diving team under head coach Brian Reynolds, while pursuing his sports management studies at Drury University in Springfield, Missouri.

Kuzmin competed for the Kazakh swimming squad in the men's 50 m freestyle at the 2008 Summer Olympics in Beijing. Leading up to the Games, he stormed home the field with a winning time of 23.09 to eclipse the FINA B-cut by just a fingertip of a second (0.04) at the Kazakhstan Open Championships in Almaty. Swimming in heat seven, Kuzmin dipped under the 23-second barrier to take the fifth spot in a scorching lifetime best of 22.91, but missed the semifinals with a forty-eighth overall placement from a roster of ninety-seven entrants.

At the 2010 Asian Games in Guangzhou, Kuzmin produced a freestyle anchor of 49.71 to deliver the Kazakh foursome of Stanislav Osinsky, 2004 Olympic fifth-place finalist Vladislav Polyakov, and newcomer Fedor Shkilyov a bronze-medal time in the 4 × 100 m medley relay, posting a textile best of 3:40.55.
