= Short course (swimming) =

25 metre-long swimming pool

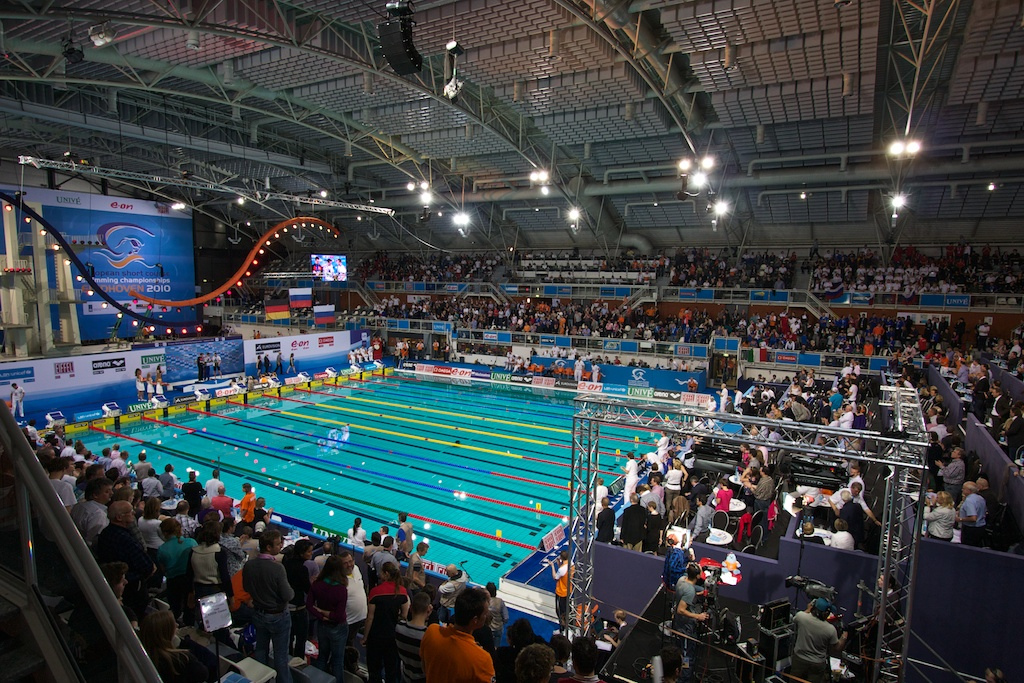
European short course championships

In competitive swimming, the term short course (abbreviated SC) is used to identify a swimming pool that is 25 metres (27.34 yd) in length. The term is also often included in meet names when conducted in a short course pool. "Short course" is the second type of pool configuration currently recognized by World Aquatics and other swimming bodies for pool competition; the other/primary pool length being "long course", where the pool is 50 meters in length. Swimming events at the Olympics and at the World Aquatics Championships are conducted in a long-course pool. The "World Aquatics Swimming Championships (25m)", colloquially the "short-course worlds", are held in alternate years from the long-course worlds. Short-course competitions may be held in a longer pool into which a temporary barrier has been placed 25 metres from one end as a turning point.

In the United States, the term "short course" is more commonly applied to 25 yards (22.86 m) competition, which is more common in that country. Short-course yards is generally abbreviated as "SCY" to differentiate it from short course meters (SCM). The US national federations, USA Swimming and U.S. Masters Swimming, both maintain SCY USA records; FINA does not currently recognize records set in SCY, but does recognize/keep SCM records. USA college (including NCAA competition) and high school swimming are traditionally swum in SCY.

Short-course meter competitions are also denoted by listing of the actual meter distance: "25m" (in swimming, a space is not placed between the number and the m for meter).

Lists of world and other records are kept separately for short- and long-course events; the short-course time is usually faster than the long-course record for the same distance. This is assumed to be connected to the increased number of turns and hence wall push-offs, where swimmers can get powerful leverage from the wall.

== Events ==
World Aquatics Swimming Championships (25m)

European Short Course Swimming Championships

Short course swimming at the Asian Indoor and Martial Arts Games

2026 World Aquatics Swimming World Cup

2026 Australian Short Course Swimming Championships

United States Short Course Swimming Championships

United States Spring Swimming Championships

Aquatics GB Swimming Championships

== See also ==
Olympic-size swimming pool
