= Harbeth Fu =

Hong Kong swimmer (born 1980)

Personal information
- Full name: Harbeth Fu Wing
- National team: Hong Kong
- Born: 18 March 1980 (age 46) Hong Kong, Hong Kong
- Height: 1.88 m (6 ft 2 in)
- Weight: 75 kg (165 lb)

Sport
- Sport: Swimming
- Strokes: Freestyle
- Club: Kwun Tong Swimming Club
- Coach: Fu Dajin

Harbeth Fu Wing (Chinese: 符泳; pinyin: Fú Yǒng; Jyutping: fu^{4} wing^{6}; born March 18, 1980) is a Hong Kong former swimmer, who specialized in sprint freestyle events. He represented Hong Kong, China at the 2000 Summer Olympics, and later became a top 16 finalist at the Asian Games (2002 and 2006).

Fu Wing competed only in the men's 50 m freestyle at the 2000 Summer Olympics in Sydney. He eclipsed a FINA B-cut of 23.71 from the Hong Kong Long Course Championships. He challenged seven other swimmers in heat four, including Kyrgyzstan's Sergey Ashihmin, Goodwill Games silver medalist for Russia, and Kazakhstan's two-time Olympian Sergey Borisenko. Fu Wing closed out the field to last place in a time of 24.20, finishing behind leader Borisenko by 0.74 seconds. Fu Wing failed to advance into the semifinals, as he placed fifty-third overall in the prelims.

At the 2002 Asian Games in Busan, South Korea, Fu Wing failed to medal in any of his individual events, finishing eleventh in the 50 m freestyle (23.66), and seventeenth in the 100 m freestyle (53.44).
