= Vitaliy Khan =

Kazakhstani swimmer (born 1985)

Personal information
- Native name: Виталий Альбертович Хан
- Full name: Vitaliy Albertovich Khan
- National team: Kazakhstan
- Born: 4 September 1985 (age 40) Almaty, Kazakhstan

Sport
- Sport: Swimming
- Strokes: Freestyle
Medal record
Men's swimming
Representing Kazakhstan
Islamic Solidarity Games
Gold medal – first place	2005 Jeddah	100 m freestyle
Silver medal – second place	2005 Jeddah	50 m freestyle
Bronze medal – third place	2005 Jeddah	200 m freestyle

Vitaliy Albertovich Khan (Kazakh: Виталий Альбертович Хан; born 4 September 1985 in Almaty) is a male freestyle swimmer from Kazakhstan, who competed for his native country at the 2004 Summer Olympics in Athens, Greece. There he ended up in 55th place in the men's 200 m freestyle event.
