= Ryo Takayasu =

Japanese swimmer

Personal information
- Full name: Ryo Takayasu
- Nationality: Japan
- Born: July 19, 1981 (age 44) Kanagawa
- Height: 182 cm (6 ft 0 in)

Sport
- Sport: Swimming
- Strokes: butterfly
- Club: Konami sports swimming team
Medal record
Men's swimming
World Championships (LC)
Bronze medal – third place	2005 Montreal	4×100m medley
Pan Pacific Championships
Silver medal – second place	2006 Victoria	100m butterfly

Ryo Takayasu (高安 亮, Takayasu Ryō; born July 19, 1981, in Kanagawa) is a Japanese butterfly swimmer.

== Major achievements ==
2006 Pan Pacific Swimming Championships

- 100m butterfly 2nd (52.59)
- 4 × 100 m medley relay 2nd (3:35.70)

2007 World Championships

- 50m butterfly 10th (24.03)
- 100m butterfly 23rd (53.53)

== Personal bests ==
In long course

- 50m butterfly: 23.45 Japanese Record (April 16, 2009)
- 100m butterfly: 52.43 (April 20, 2008)

In short course

- 50m butterfly: 23.04 (March 16, 2008)
- 100m butterfly: 49.90 Asian, Japanese Record (March 8, 2009)
