= Jeong Doo-hee =

South Korean swimmer (born 1984)

Jeong Doo-hee OLY
Personal information
- Full name: Jeong Doo-hee
- National team: South Korea
- Born: 4 December 1984 (age 41) Seoul, South Korea
- Height: 1.80 m (5 ft 11 in)
- Weight: 73 kg (161 lb)

Korean name
- Hangul: 정두희
- RR: Jeong Duhui
- MR: Chŏng Tuhŭi

Sport
- Sport: Swimming
- Strokes: Butterfly
- Club: Korea National Training Center
Medal record
Men's swimming
Representing South Korea
Asian Games
Silver medal – second place	2010 Guangzhou	4×100 m medley
Bronze medal – third place	2006 Doha	4×100 m medley

Jeong Doo-hee (Korean: 정두희; born December 4, 1984) is a South Korean former swimmer, who specialized in butterfly events. He represented his nation South Korea at the 2004 Summer Olympics, and shared silver medals with Park Seon-kwan, Choi Kyu-woong, and Park Tae-hwan in the 4×100 m medley relay at the 2010 Asian Games in Guangzhou, China.

Jeong qualified for two swimming events at the 2004 Summer Olympics in Athens, by clearing FINA B-standard entry times of 54.91 (100 m butterfly) and 2:00.84 (200 m butterfly) from the Dong-A Swimming Tournament in Seoul. In the 200 m butterfly, Jeong challenged seven other swimmers on the second heat, including Olympic veteran Vladan Marković of Serbia and Montenegro. He raced to second place in his heat and twenty-fourth overall by 0.84 of a second behind Canada's Nathaniel O'Brien in 2:00.96. In the 100 m butterfly, Jeong blasted a new South Korean record of 54.79 to break a 55-second barrier and top the third heat. Jeong failed to advance into the semifinals, as he placed thirty-eighth overall out of 59 swimmers in the preliminaries.
