= Ravil Nachaev =

Uzbek swimmer (born 1974)

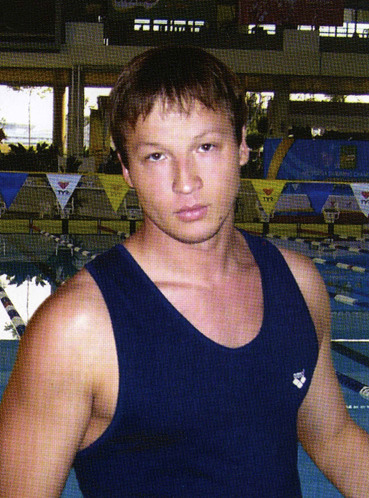

Personal information
- Full name: Ravil Nachaev
- National team: Uzbekistan
- Born: 17 June 1974 (age 52) Tashkent, Uzbek SSR, Soviet Union
- Height: 1.91 m (6 ft 3 in)
- Weight: 90 kg (198 lb)

Sport
- Sport: Swimming
- Strokes: Freestyle, butterfly
Medal record
Men's swimming
Representing Uzbekistan
Asian Games
Gold medal – first place	2002 Busan	50 m freestyle
Afro-Asian Games
Gold medal – first place	2003 Hyderabad	50 m freestyle
Asian Indoor Games
Gold medal – first place	2005 Bangkok	50 m freestyle
Gold medal – first place	2005 Bangkok	100 m freestyle
Gold medal – first place	2005 Bangkok	4×100 m freestyle
Silver medal – second place	2005 Bangkok	4×100 m medley
Silver medal – second place	2005 Bangkok	4×50 m freestyle
Bronze medal – third place	2005 Bangkok	50 m butterfly
Bronze medal – third place	2005 Bangkok	100 m butterfly
Asian Championships
Gold medal – first place	1996 Bangkok	4×100 m freestyle
Silver medal – second place	2006 Singapore	4×100 m freestyle
Bronze medal – third place	2000 Busan	100 m butterfly
Bronze medal – third place	2006 Singapore	50 m freestyle

Ravil Nachaev (also Ravil Nagayev, Russian: Равиль Начаев; born June 17, 1974, in Tashkent) is an Uzbek former swimmer, who specialized in sprint freestyle and butterfly events. He is a three-time Olympian (1996, 2000, and 2004), and a gold medalist in the 50 m freestyle at the 2002 Asian Games in Busan, South Korea.

Nachaev made his official debut, as a 22-year-old, at the 1996 Summer Olympics in Atlanta. He failed to reach the top 16 final in any of his individual events, finishing forty-fifth in the 50 m freestyle (23.12), and forty-eighth in the 100 m butterfly (56.61). He also placed seventeenth, as a member of the Uzbekistan team, in the 4 × 100 m freestyle relay (3:28.33).

At the 2000 Summer Olympics in Sydney, Nachaev competed as a member of the Uzbekistan team in the 4 × 100 m freestyle relay, along with Oleg Tsvetkovskiy, Petr Vasiliev, and Oleg Pukhnatiy. Although he swam the anchor leg in heat one, his team had been disqualified due to an early relay takeoff by Pukhnatiy. On the sixth day of the Games, Nachaev swam his two individual events, with only 90 minutes in between. First, he posted a lifetime best of 23.12 to lead the fifth heat of the 50 m freestyle. More than an hour later, in the 100 m butterfly, Nachaev stormed the entire field to another triumph in heat three by 0.04 seconds, with a time of 55.21. Despite winning the heats in just a single day, he failed to advance into the semifinals in any of his individual events, finishing thirtieth in the 50 m freestyle, and thirty-fourth in the 100 m butterfly.

Nachaev later emerged as Uzbekistan's top swimmer, when he shared the gold with South Korea's Kim Min-suk in the 50 m freestyle, a matching time of 22.86 seconds, at the 2002 Asian Games in Busan.

Nachaev shortened his program at the 2004 Summer Olympics in Athens, when he swam only for the third time in the 50 m freestyle. He achieved a FINA B-standard of 23.49 from the Kazakhstan Open Championships in Almaty. Nachaev registered a time of 23.23 to lead the fifth heat again, since he had previously done before in Sydney four years earlier. Nachaev failed to reach the semifinals for his third and final Olympic stint, placing thirty-sixth in the preliminaries.
