= Stanislav Ossinskiy =

Kazakhstani swimmer (born 1984)

Personal information
- Born: April 23, 1984 (age 42) Karaganda, Kazakh SSR, Soviet Union

Sport
- Sport: Swimming
Medal record
Representing Kazakhstan
Asian Games
Bronze medal – third place	2010 Guangzhou	4x100m medley relay

Stanislav Aleksandrovich Ossinskiy (Kazakh: Станислав Александрович Осинский; born 23 April 1984) is a male backstroke swimmer from Kazakhstan, who twice competed for his native country at the Summer Olympics: 2004 and 2008. His best result was finishing in 41st place in the men's 100m backstroke event in Athens, Greece (2004).
