= Rustam Khudiyev =

Kazakhstani swimmer (born 1985)

Personal information
- Full name: Rustam Ramizovich Khudiyev
- Nationality: Kazakhstan
- Born: 6 January 1985 (age 41) Pavlodar, Kazak SSR, USSR
- Height: 1.77 m (5 ft 10 in)

Sport
- Sport: Swimming
- Strokes: butterfly
Medal record
Representing Kazakhstan
Asian Games
Bronze medal – third place	2010 Guangzhou	4x100m medley relay

Rustam Ramizovich Khudiyev (Kazakh: Рустам Рамизович Худиев, Rustam Ramizovich Hudiev; born 6 January 1985 in Pavlodar, Kazakh SSR, USSR) is an Olympic butterfly swimmer from Kazakhstan. He swam for Kazakhstan at the 2004 and 2008 Olympics.

His best result was finishing in 41st place in the men's 100m butterfly event in at the 2004 Games.

He also swam for Kazakhstan at the 2007 World Championships.
