= Short course swimming at the 2009 Asian Indoor Games =

- Venue: Mỹ Đình National Aquatics Sports Complex
- Dates: 4–7 November 2009

Short course swimming at the 2009 Asian Indoor Games was held in Mỹ Đình National Aquatics Sports Complex, Hanoi, Vietnam from 4 November to 7 November 2009.

== Medalists ==
=== Men ===
Event	Gold		Silver		Bronze	
50 m freestyle	Stanislav Kuzmin; Kazakhstan	22.20; GR	Daniil Tulupov; Uzbekistan	22.29	Virdhawal Khade; India	22.45
50 m freestyle	Stanislav Kuzmin; Kazakhstan	22.20; GR	Daniil Tulupov; Uzbekistan	22.29	Danil Bugakov; Uzbekistan	22.45
100 m freestyle	Pu Wenjie; China	48.56; GR	Daniil Tulupov; Uzbekistan	48.60	Alexandr Sklyar; Kazakhstan	48.75
200 m freestyle	Pu Wenjie; China	1:47.40; GR	Aaron D'Souza; India	1:48.39	Virdhawal Khade; India	1:48.72
50 m backstroke	Shi Feng; China	24.06; GR	Danil Bugakov; Uzbekistan	24.91	Stanislav Ossinskiy; Kazakhstan	24.94
100 m backstroke	Shi Feng; China	51.86; GR	Stanislav Ossinskiy; Kazakhstan	53.28	Hwang Gyeong-sik; South Korea	54.39
50 m breaststroke	Vladislav Polyakov; Kazakhstan	26.94; GR	Nguyễn Hữu Việt; Vietnam	27.48	Yevgeniy Ryzhkov; Kazakhstan	27.50
100 m breaststroke	Vladislav Polyakov; Kazakhstan	58.28; GR	Yevgeniy Ryzhkov; Kazakhstan	58.96	Nguyễn Hữu Việt; Vietnam	59.09
50 m butterfly	Shi Feng; China	22.92; GR	Stanislav Kuzmin; Kazakhstan	23.74	Rustam Khudiyev; Kazakhstan	23.85
100 m butterfly	Shi Feng; China	50.71; GR	Rustam Khudiyev; Kazakhstan	51.96	Stanislav Kuzmin; Kazakhstan	52.45
100 m individual medley	Dmitriy Gordiyenko; Kazakhstan	54.87; GR	Artur Dilman; Kazakhstan	55.10	Radomyos Matjiur; Thailand	55.25
200 m individual medley	Dmitriy Gordiyenko; Kazakhstan	1:57.50; GR	Miguel Molina; Philippines	1:59.89	Hsu Chi-chieh; Chinese Taipei	2:00.88
4 × 50 m freestyle relay	Kazakhstan; Stanislav Kuzmin; Alexandr Sklyar; Artur Dilman; Rustam Khudiyev	1:28.87; GR	Uzbekistan; Daniil Tulupov; Dmitriy Shvetsov; Petr Romashkin; Danil Bugakov	1:29.23	Hong Kong; Yan Ho Chun; Andres Tung; Chung Lai Yeung; Kong Chun Yin	1:29.81
4 × 100 m freestyle relay	Uzbekistan; Daniil Tulupov; Dmitriy Shvetsov; Petr Romashkin; Danil Bugakov	3:17.33; GR	Iran; Mohammad Bidarian; Emin Noshadi; Pasha Vahdati; Saeid Maleka Ashtiani	3:17.81	India; Aaron D'Souza; Rehan Poncha; Arjun Jayaprakash; Virdhawal Khade	3:18.59
4 × 50 m medley relay	Kazakhstan; Stanislav Ossinskiy; Vladislav Polyakov; Rustam Khudiyev; Stanislav Kuzmin	1:36.60; GR	Hong Kong; Chung Lai Yeung; Eric Chan; Yan Ho Chun; Kong Chun Yin	1:39.91	Iran; Saeid Maleka Ashtiani; Mohammad Alirezaei; Gamer Dilanchian; Mohammad Bidarian	1:40.02
4 × 100 m medley relay	India; Rehan Poncha; Sandeep Sejwal; Aaron D'Souza; Virdhawal Khade	3:37.03; GR	Vietnam; Đỗ Huy Long; Nguyễn Hữu Việt; Võ Thái Nguyên; Nguyễn Thanh Hải	3:37.85	Hong Kong; Chung Lai Yeung; Eric Chan; David Wong; Andres Tung	3:37.91

=== Women ===
Event	Gold		Silver		Bronze	
50 m freestyle	Natthanan Junkrajang; Thailand	25.13; GR	Sze Hang Yu; Hong Kong	25.20	Yang Chin-kuei; Chinese Taipei	25.69
100 m freestyle	Natthanan Junkrajang; Thailand	54.52; GR	Sze Hang Yu; Hong Kong	54.81	Yang Chin-kuei; Chinese Taipei	54.95
200 m freestyle	Yang Chin-kuei; Chinese Taipei	1:57.47; GR	Natthanan Junkrajang; Thailand	1:59.77	Ji Ye-won; South Korea	2:01.67
50 m backstroke	Anastassiya Prilepa; Kazakhstan	27.85; GR	Yekaterina Rudenko; Kazakhstan	28.13	Sherry Tsai; Hong Kong	28.20
100 m backstroke	Anastassiya Prilepa; Kazakhstan	1:00.14; GR	Sherry Tsai; Hong Kong	1:00.62	Claudia Lau; Hong Kong	1:01.26
50 m breaststroke	Yvette Kong; Hong Kong	31.33; GR	Yekaterina Sadovnik; Kazakhstan	32.01	Yuliya Litvina; Kazakhstan	32.16
100 m breaststroke	Yvette Kong; Hong Kong	1:06.90; GR	Yuliya Litvina; Kazakhstan	1:08.89	Fiona Ma; Hong Kong	1:10.09
50 m butterfly	Guo Fan; China	26.08; GR	Li Shuang; China	26.36	Sze Hang Yu; Hong Kong	26.61
100 m butterfly	Guo Fan; China	57.41; GR	Sze Hang Yu; Hong Kong	58.14	Li Shuang; China	58.20
100 m individual medley	Elmira Aigaliyeva; Kazakhstan	1:02.76	Sherry Tsai; Hong Kong	1:02.88	Lee Mi-rim; South Korea	1:03.87
200 m individual medley	Guo Fan; China	2:12.79; GR	Natthanan Junkrajang; Thailand	2:13.57	Sherry Tsai; Hong Kong	2:14.98
4 × 50 m freestyle relay	China; Li Shuang; Chen Cheng; Han Wei; Guo Fan	1:41.13; GR	Hong Kong; Yu Wai Ting; Sherry Tsai; Yvette Kong; Sze Hang Yu	1:42.38	Kazakhstan; Yekaterina Gakhokidze; Yekaterina Rudenko; Elmira Aigaliyeva; Anastassiya Prilepa	1:43.80
4 × 100 m freestyle relay	Hong Kong; Yvette Kong; Sherry Tsai; Claudia Lau; Sze Hang Yu	3:42.13; GR	Thailand; Natsaya Susuk; Rutai Santadvatana; Wenika Kaewchaiwong; Natthanan Junkrajang	3:44.23	China; Zhao Yuting; Chen Cheng; Han Wei; Guo Fan	3:44.40
4 × 50 m medley relay	Hong Kong; Sherry Tsai; Yvette Kong; Sze Hang Yu; Yu Wai Ting	1:50.59; GR	China; Chen Cheng; Li Shuang; Zhao Yuting; Guo Jiarui	1:52.99	Kazakhstan; Yekaterina Rudenko; Yekaterina Sadovnik; Elmira Aigaliyeva; Yekaterina Gakhokidze	1:53.38
4 × 100 m medley relay	Hong Kong; Sherry Tsai; Yvette Kong; Sze Hang Yu; Claudia Lau	4:00.81; GR	Kazakhstan; Anastassiya Prilepa; Yuliya Litvina; Elmira Aigaliyeva; Yekaterina Gakhokidze	4:04.02	China; Guo Jiarui; Li Shuang; Zhao Yuting; Han Wei	4:04.40

== Medal table ==
Rank	Nation	Gold	Silver	Bronze	Total
1	Kazakhstan (KAZ)	10	9	8	27
2	China (CHN)	10	2	3	15
3	Hong Kong (HKG)	5	7	7	19
4	Thailand (THA)	2	3	1	6
5	Uzbekistan (UZB)	1	4	1	6
6	India (IND)	1	1	3	5
7	Chinese Taipei (TPE)	1	0	3	4
8	Vietnam (VIE)	0	2	1	3
9	Iran (IRI)	0	1	1	2
10	Philippines (PHI)	0	1	0	1
11	South Korea (KOR)	0	0	3	3
Totals (11 entries)		30	30	31	91

== Results ==
=== Men ===
==== 50 m freestyle ====
4 November

Rank	Athlete	Heats	Final
1st place, gold medalist(s)	Stanislav Kuzmin (KAZ)	22.42	22.20
2nd place, silver medalist(s)	Daniil Tulupov (UZB)	23.15	22.29
3rd place, bronze medalist(s)	Virdhawal Khade (IND)	22.30	22.45
3rd place, bronze medalist(s)	Danil Bugakov (UZB)	23.03	22.45
5	Pasha Vahdati (IRI)	22.90	22.83
6	Lao Kuan Fong (MAC)	22.85	22.86
7	Mohammad Bidarian (IRI)	22.74	22.97
8	Chung Lai Yeung (HKG)	23.09	23.31
9	Yan Ho Chun (HKG)	23.23	
10	Artur Dilman (KAZ)	23.30	
11	Arwut Chinnapasaen (THA)	23.32	
12	Kareem Ennab (JOR)	23.33	
13	Hwang Gyeong-sik (KOR)	23.40	
14	Hou Mingda (CHN)	23.46	
15	Gan Yanlin (CHN)	23.50	
16	Nather Al-Hamoud (KSA)	23.60	
17	Yang June-hyuck (KOR)	23.70	
18	Hoàng Quý Phước (VIE)	24.08	
19	Arjun Jayaprakash (IND)	24.09	
20	Lê Quốc Dũng (VIE)	24.40	
21	Omar Yusuf (BRN)	24.56	
22	Bader Al-Muhana (KSA)	24.58	
23	Ahmad Mohammad (KUW)	24.80	
24	Nawaf Al-Qasmi (OMA)	24.86	
25	Awse Maaya (JOR)	25.50	
25	Chong Cheok Kuan (MAC)	25.50	
27	Sufyan Al-Malki (BRN)	25.90	
28	Vorrawuti Aumpiwan (THA)	26.10	

==== 100 m freestyle ====
7 November

Rank	Athlete	Heats	Final
1st place, gold medalist(s)	Pu Wenjie (CHN)	50.08	48.56
2nd place, silver medalist(s)	Daniil Tulupov (UZB)	49.77	48.60
3rd place, bronze medalist(s)	Alexandr Sklyar (KAZ)	48.77	48.75
4	Virdhawal Khade (IND)	49.58	49.05
5	Mohammad Bidarian (IRI)	50.14	49.10
6	Stanislav Kuzmin (KAZ)	50.17	49.29
7	Emin Noshadi (IRI)	50.36	49.94
8	Aaron D'Souza (IND)	50.20	52.66
9	Miguel Molina (PHI)	50.40	
10	Vasilii Danilov (KGZ)	50.41	
11	Kong Chun Yin (HKG)	50.50	
12	Petr Romashkin (UZB)	50.61	
13	Abdullah Al-Thuwaini (KUW)	50.72	
14	Yang June-hyuck (KOR)	50.78	
15	Kareem Ennab (JOR)	51.94	
16	Kim Byum-gyu (KOR)	52.22	
17	Rami Anis (SYR)	52.36	
18	Lao Kuan Fong (MAC)	52.51	
19	Hou Mingda (CHN)	52.54	
20	Andres Tung (HKG)	53.81	
21	Yang Tzu-hsien (TPE)	54.05	
22	Ahmad Mohammad (KUW)	54.08	
23	Nather Al-Hamoud (KSA)	54.64	
24	Nawaf Al-Qasmi (OMA)	54.75	
25	Châu Bá Anh Tư (VIE)	54.88	
26	Omer Mithqal (JOR)	55.23	
27	Sufyan Al-Malki (BRN)	57.14	
28	Nguyễn Thanh Hải (VIE)	59.25	

==== 200 m freestyle ====
6 November

Rank	Athlete	Heats	Final
1st place, gold medalist(s)	Pu Wenjie (CHN)	1:48.50	1:47.40
2nd place, silver medalist(s)	Aaron D'Souza (IND)	1:49.09	1:48.39
3rd place, bronze medalist(s)	Virdhawal Khade (IND)	1:50.14	1:48.72
4	Artur Dilman (KAZ)	1:49.93	1:48.87
5	Miguel Molina (PHI)	1:49.25	1:48.96
6	Saeid Maleka Ashtiani (IRI)	1:50.37	1:49.19
7	David Wong (HKG)	1:50.20	1:49.58
8	Vasilii Danilov (KGZ)	1:50.07	1:50.24
9	Petr Romashkin (UZB)	1:50.43	
10	Sobitjon Amilov (UZB)	1:50.47	
11	Nguyễn Thanh Hải (VIE)	1:51.13	
12	Emin Noshadi (IRI)	1:51.66	
13	Alexandr Sklyar (KAZ)	1:52.06	
14	Gan Yanlin (CHN)	1:52.39	
15	Yang June-hyuck (KOR)	1:52.64	
16	Kim Byum-gyu (KOR)	1:53.41	
17	Andres Tung (HKG)	1:55.08	
18	Loai Tashkandi (KSA)	1:55.46	
19	Sauod Al-Tayar (KUW)	1:57.05	
20	Phạm Thành Nguyên (VIE)	1:57.19	
21	Omer Mithqal (JOR)	2:02.21	
22	Kareem Ennab (JOR)	2:07.19	
23	Nather Al-Hamoud (KSA)	2:14.19	

==== 50 m backstroke ====
5 November

Rank	Athlete	Heats	Final
1st place, gold medalist(s)	Shi Feng (CHN)	25.02	24.06
2nd place, silver medalist(s)	Danil Bugakov (UZB)	25.81	24.91
3rd place, bronze medalist(s)	Stanislav Ossinskiy (KAZ)	24.81	24.94
4	Đỗ Huy Long (VIE)	26.18	24.98
5	Abdullah Al-Thuwaini (KUW)	26.15	25.37
6	Hwang Gyeong-sik (KOR)	25.39	25.68
7	Radomyos Matjiur (THA)	25.92	25.69
8	Ruslan Baimanov (KAZ)	25.88	26.05
9	Chung Lai Yeung (HKG)	26.23	
10	Antonio Tong (MAC)	26.26	
11	Daniil Bukin (UZB)	26.93	
12	Aiman Al-Kulaibi (OMA)	27.22	
13	M. B. Balakrishnan (IND)	27.29	
14	Nguyễn Ngọc Tân (VIE)	27.79	
15	Yang Tzu-hsien (TPE)	27.89	
16	Awse Maaya (JOR)	27.90	
17	Hazem Tashkandi (KSA)	28.07	
18	Yu Sen (CHN)	28.19	

==== 100 m backstroke ====
6 November

Rank	Athlete	Heats	Final
1st place, gold medalist(s)	Shi Feng (CHN)	56.07	51.86
2nd place, silver medalist(s)	Stanislav Ossinskiy (KAZ)	55.44	53.28
3rd place, bronze medalist(s)	Hwang Gyeong-sik (KOR)	55.53	54.39
4	Danil Bugakov (UZB)	56.72	54.48
5	Abdullah Al-Thuwaini (KUW)	55.92	54.79
6	Ruslan Baimanov (KAZ)	55.50	55.17
7	Rehan Poncha (IND)	56.62	55.73
8	Antonio Tong (MAC)	56.89	57.10
9	Chung Lai Yeung (HKG)	57.35	
10	Daniil Bukin (UZB)	57.85	
11	Aiman Al-Kulaibi (OMA)	58.06	
12	Yang Tzu-hsien (TPE)	58.65	
13	M. B. Balakrishnan (IND)	59.45	
14	Nguyễn Ngọc Tân (VIE)	1:00.27	
15	Awse Maaya (JOR)	1:00.39	
16	Hazem Tashkandi (KSA)	1:01.91	
17	Radomyos Matjiur (THA)	1:03.48	
—	Yu Sen (CHN)	DSQ	
—	Đỗ Huy Long (VIE)	DSQ	

==== 50 m breaststroke ====
5 November

Rank	Athlete	Heats	Final
1st place, gold medalist(s)	Vladislav Polyakov (KAZ)	27.46	26.94
2nd place, silver medalist(s)	Nguyễn Hữu Việt (VIE)	27.70	27.48
3rd place, bronze medalist(s)	Yevgeniy Ryzhkov (KAZ)	28.12	27.50
4	Sandeep Sejwal (IND)	27.97	27.71
5	Mohammad Alirezaei (IRI)	28.65	27.78
6	Vorrawuti Aumpiwan (THA)	28.32	27.92
7	Eric Chan (HKG)	28.39	28.12
8	Ivan Demyanenko (UZB)	28.57	28.25
9	Dmitriy Shvetsov (UZB)	29.03	
10	Dmitri Aleksandrov (KGZ)	29.45	
11	Arjun Jayaprakash (IND)	29.54	
12	Miguel Molina (PHI)	29.74	
13	Murtadha Hussain Al-Bin (KSA)	29.93	
14	Jeon Min-cheol (KOR)	29.96	
15	Jehad Al-Henidi (JOR)	30.24	
16	Hou An-yuan (TPE)	30.43	
17	Trần Ngọc Bảo (VIE)	30.54	
18	Chou Kit (MAC)	30.59	
19	Omar Yusuf (BRN)	31.03	
20	Ahmad Al-Bader (KUW)	31.40	
21	Rami Fetyani (KSA)	31.66	
22	Yu Sen (CHN)	34.58	

==== 100 m breaststroke ====
4 November

Rank	Athlete	Heats	Final
1st place, gold medalist(s)	Vladislav Polyakov (KAZ)	1:00.39	58.28
2nd place, silver medalist(s)	Yevgeniy Ryzhkov (KAZ)	1:01.63	58.96
3rd place, bronze medalist(s)	Nguyễn Hữu Việt (VIE)	59.75	59.09
4	Mohammad Alirezaei (IRI)	1:01.88	1:01.35
5	Eric Chan (HKG)	1:01.67	1:01.80
6	Dmitri Aleksandrov (KGZ)	1:02.40	1:02.14
7	Vorrawuti Aumpiwan (THA)	1:02.66	1:02.67
8	Jeon Min-cheol (KOR)	1:02.96	1:03.47
9	Sandeep Sejwal (IND)	1:03.30	
10	Ivan Demyanenko (UZB)	1:03.71	
11	Arjun Jayaprakash (IND)	1:05.40	
12	Hou An-yuan (TPE)	1:05.64	
13	Chou Kit (MAC)	1:06.27	
14	Jehad Al-Henidi (JOR)	1:06.34	
15	Nguyễn Trung Phong (VIE)	1:06.97	
16	Murtadha Hussain Al-Bin (KSA)	1:07.01	
17	Rami Fetyani (KSA)	1:07.50	
18	Ahmad Al-Bader (KUW)	1:07.71	
19	Yu Sen (CHN)	1:12.44	

==== 50 m butterfly ====
6 November

Rank	Athlete	Heats	Final
1st place, gold medalist(s)	Shi Feng (CHN)	23.72	22.92
2nd place, silver medalist(s)	Stanislav Kuzmin (KAZ)	24.15	23.74
3rd place, bronze medalist(s)	Rustam Khudiyev (KAZ)	24.51	23.85
4	Bader Al-Muhana (KSA)	24.97	24.15
5	Eric Chan (HKG)	24.26	24.49
6	Zhang Yinqing (CHN)	24.58	24.73
7	Hsu Chi-chieh (TPE)	25.03	24.89
8	Chatmongkon Noiaree (THA)	25.06	25.22
9	Lee Seung-hyun (KOR)	25.11	
10	Kang Ryong-gu (PRK)	25.27	
11	Võ Thái Nguyên (VIE)	25.36	
12	Yan Ho Chun (HKG)	25.43	
12	Lao Kuan Fong (MAC)	25.43	
14	Gamer Dilanchian (IRI)	25.46	
15	Aleksey Derlyugov (UZB)	25.50	
16	Kareem Ennab (JOR)	25.64	
17	Nather Al-Hamoud (KSA)	25.83	
18	Virdhawal Khade (IND)	25.89	
19	Daniil Tulupov (UZB)	26.00	
20	Arjun Jayaprakash (IND)	26.28	
21	Omer Mithqal (JOR)	26.46	
22	Chong Cheok Kuan (MAC)	26.67	
23	Nguyễn Đinh Nhật Nam (VIE)	26.80	
24	Nawaf Al-Qasmi (OMA)	27.31	

==== 100 m butterfly ====
5 November

Rank	Athlete	Heats	Final
1st place, gold medalist(s)	Shi Feng (CHN)	52.79	50.71
2nd place, silver medalist(s)	Rustam Khudiyev (KAZ)	54.47	51.96
3rd place, bronze medalist(s)	Stanislav Kuzmin (KAZ)	53.39	52.45
4	Virdhawal Khade (IND)	54.41	53.24
5	David Wong (HKG)	53.49	53.26
6	Hsu Chi-chieh (TPE)	54.39	53.44
7	Bader Al-Muhana (KSA)	54.81	54.22
8	Lee Seung-hyun (KOR)	54.96	54.88
9	Chatmongkon Noiaree (THA)	55.10	
10	Rami Anis (SYR)	55.15	
11	Võ Thái Nguyên (VIE)	55.25	
12	Aaron D'Souza (IND)	55.26	
13	Aleksey Derlyugov (UZB)	55.28	
14	Zhang Yinqing (CHN)	55.39	
15	Emin Noshadi (IRI)	55.85	
16	Gamer Dilanchian (IRI)	56.68	
17	Kareem Ennab (JOR)	56.71	
18	Kang Ryong-gu (PRK)	56.79	
19	Nather Al-Hamoud (KSA)	57.23	
20	Omer Mithqal (JOR)	57.69	
21	Chong Cheok Kuan (MAC)	58.40	
22	Trần Đức Huy (VIE)	59.87	

==== 100 m individual medley ====
7 November

Rank	Athlete	Heats	Final
1st place, gold medalist(s)	Dmitriy Gordiyenko (KAZ)	55.64	54.87
2nd place, silver medalist(s)	Artur Dilman (KAZ)	56.17	55.10
3rd place, bronze medalist(s)	Radomyos Matjiur (THA)	56.33	55.25
4	Miguel Molina (PHI)	57.03	55.51
5	Hsu Chi-chieh (TPE)	57.02	55.69
6	Saeid Maleka Ashtiani (IRI)	56.98	56.33
7	Danil Bugakov (UZB)	57.24	56.64
8	Dmitriy Shvetsov (UZB)	56.61	56.78
9	Thanyanant Phadungkiatwatana (THA)	57.88	
10	Zhang Shuhuai (CHN)	58.08	
11	Sandeep Sejwal (IND)	58.43	
12	Yan Ho Chun (HKG)	58.58	
13	Nguyễn Văn Tý (VIE)	58.79	
14	Loai Tashkandi (KSA)	59.49	
15	Hazem Tashkandi (KSA)	1:00.29	
16	Phạm Đức Toàn (VIE)	1:00.98	
17	Kang Ryong-gu (PRK)	1:01.73	
18	Hou An-yuan (TPE)	1:02.72	
19	Jehad Al-Henidi (JOR)	1:03.07	
20	Awse Maaya (JOR)	1:03.37	
21	Sauod Al-Tayar (KUW)	1:03.58	
22	Rehan Poncha (IND)	1:04.71	
23	Cui Shuhao (CHN)	1:06.54	

==== 200 m individual medley ====
4 November

Rank	Athlete	Heats	Final
1st place, gold medalist(s)	Dmitriy Gordiyenko (KAZ)	2:00.51	1:57.50
2nd place, silver medalist(s)	Miguel Molina (PHI)	2:03.26	1:59.89
3rd place, bronze medalist(s)	Hsu Chi-chieh (TPE)	2:02.61	2:00.88
4	Saeid Maleka Ashtiani (IRI)	2:03.75	2:01.12
5	Vasilii Danilov (KGZ)	2:03.43	2:01.35
6	David Wong (HKG)	2:04.01	2:02.87
7	Rehan Poncha (IND)	2:03.50	2:03.04
8	Zhang Shuhuai (CHN)	2:05.30	2:07.09
9	Dmitriy Shvetsov (UZB)	2:05.44	
10	Radomyos Matjiur (THA)	2:05.47	
11	Nguyễn Văn Tý (VIE)	2:05.67	
12	Sobitjon Amilov (UZB)	2:06.92	
13	Loai Tashkandi (KSA)	2:08.61	
14	Kim Byum-gyu (KOR)	2:09.82	
15	Hazem Tashkandi (KSA)	2:12.12	
16	Sauod Al-Tayar (KUW)	2:15.39	
17	Omer Mithqal (JOR)	2:18.95	
18	Cui Shuhao (CHN)	2:22.72	

==== 4 × 50 m freestyle relay ====
6 November

Rank	Team	Heats	Final
1st place, gold medalist(s)	Kazakhstan (KAZ)	1:31.08	1:28.87
2nd place, silver medalist(s)	Uzbekistan (UZB)	1:31.44	1:29.23
3rd place, bronze medalist(s)	Hong Kong (HKG)	1:31.69	1:29.81
4	Iran (IRI)	1:31.16	1:29.90
5	China (CHN)	1:33.11	1:29.96
6	Thailand (THA)	1:32.00	1:30.96
7	India (IND)	1:33.55	1:31.66
8	South Korea (KOR)	1:34.30	1:33.24
9	Vietnam (VIE)	1:36.51	
10	Saudi Arabia (KSA)	1:36.82	
11	Macau (MAC)	1:38.33	
12	Jordan (JOR)	1:39.35	
13	Kuwait (KUW)	1:39.49	

==== 4 × 100 m freestyle relay ====
5 November

Rank	Team	Heats	Final
1st place, gold medalist(s)	Uzbekistan (UZB)	3:20.99	3:17.33
2nd place, silver medalist(s)	Iran (IRI)	3:21.30	3:17.81
3rd place, bronze medalist(s)	India (IND)	3:27.05	3:18.59
4	Hong Kong (HKG)	3:22.00	3:18.85
5	China (CHN)	3:22.00	3:20.15
6	Vietnam (VIE)	3:31.34	3:29.73
7	Saudi Arabia (KSA)	3:35.26	3:32.17
—	South Korea (KOR)	3:26.99	DSQ
9	Kuwait (KUW)	3:35.85	
10	Macau (MAC)	3:39.98	
11	Jordan (JOR)	3:43.84	
—	Kazakhstan (KAZ)	DSQ	

==== 4 × 50 m medley relay ====
4 November

Rank	Team	Heats	Final
1st place, gold medalist(s)	Kazakhstan (KAZ)	1:39.09	1:36.60
2nd place, silver medalist(s)	Hong Kong (HKG)	1:43.04	1:39.91
3rd place, bronze medalist(s)	Iran (IRI)	1:42.14	1:40.02
4	India (IND)	1:42.36	1:40.30
5	Thailand (THA)	1:42.74	1:41.34
6	South Korea (KOR)	1:43.62	1:42.61
—	China (CHN)	1:40.68	DSQ
—	Vietnam (VIE)	1:42.69	DSQ
9	Macau (MAC)	1:46.44	
10	Saudi Arabia (KSA)	1:46.94	
11	Jordan (JOR)	1:47.95	
12	Kuwait (KUW)	1:49.22	
—	Uzbekistan (UZB)	DSQ	

==== 4 × 100 m medley relay ====
7 November

Rank	Team	Heats	Final
1st place, gold medalist(s)	India (IND)	3:44.36	3:37.03
2nd place, silver medalist(s)	Vietnam (VIE)	3:44.14	3:37.85
3rd place, bronze medalist(s)	Hong Kong (HKG)	3:44.96	3:37.91
4	Uzbekistan (UZB)	3:44.18	3:38.95
5	South Korea (KOR)	3:43.70	3:40.65
6	Iran (IRI)	3:51.40	3:43.93
7	Macau (MAC)	3:58.06	3:56.58
8	Jordan (JOR)	3:58.40	3:59.59
9	Kuwait (KUW)	4:03.67	
10	Saudi Arabia (KSA)	4:16.42	
—	China (CHN)	DSQ	
—	Kazakhstan (KAZ)	DSQ	
—	Thailand (THA)	DSQ	

=== Women ===
==== 50 m freestyle ====
4 November

Rank	Athlete	Heats	Final
1st place, gold medalist(s)	Natthanan Junkrajang (THA)	25.30	25.13
2nd place, silver medalist(s)	Sze Hang Yu (HKG)	25.30	25.20
3rd place, bronze medalist(s)	Yang Chin-kuei (TPE)	26.00	25.69
4	Chen Cheng (CHN)	26.10	25.73
5	Han Wei (CHN)	25.90	25.85
6	Yu Wai Ting (HKG)	26.20	25.92
7	Yekaterina Gakhokidze (KAZ)	26.10	26.40
8	Ma Cheok Mei (MAC)	26.80	26.93
9	Benjaporn Sriphanomthorn (THA)	26.90	
10	Ji Ye-won (KOR)	27.00	
11	Tan Chi Yan (MAC)	27.40	
11	Shubha Chittaranjan (IND)	27.40	
11	Lana Chernyshova (KAZ)	27.40	
14	Yulduz Kuchkarova (UZB)	27.50	
15	Bayan Jumah (SYR)	27.60	
16	Hsieh Hsin-jung (TPE)	27.70	
17	Talasha Prabhu (IND)	27.80	
18	Miriam Hatamleh (JOR)	27.90	
19	Alfiya Gimaeva (UZB)	28.30	
20	Talita Baqlah (JOR)	28.40	
21	Nguyễn Thị Ngọc Bích (VIE)	28.80	
22	Lê Thị Trang (VIE)	29.00	

==== 100 m freestyle ====
7 November

Rank	Athlete	Heats	Final
1st place, gold medalist(s)	Natthanan Junkrajang (THA)	56.77	54.52
2nd place, silver medalist(s)	Sze Hang Yu (HKG)	55.74	54.81
3rd place, bronze medalist(s)	Yang Chin-kuei (TPE)	55.84	54.94
4	Ji Ye-won (KOR)	56.96	56.62
5	Yu Wai Ting (HKG)	57.33	56.64
6	Yekaterina Gakhokidze (KAZ)	56.78	56.78
7	Rutai Santadvatana (THA)	57.89	56.85
7	Chen Cheng (CHN)	57.20	56.85
9	Han Wei (CHN)	57.92	
10	Ranohon Amanova (UZB)	57.94	
11	Ma Cheok Mei (MAC)	58.70	
12	Hsieh Hsin-jung (TPE)	58.97	
13	Yulduz Kuchkarova (UZB)	59.24	
14	Miriam Hatamleh (JOR)	59.25	
15	Shubha Chittaranjan (IND)	59.77	
16	Lana Chernyshova (KAZ)	59.92	
17	Võ Thị Thanh Vy (VIE)	1:00.34	
18	Tan Chi Yan (MAC)	1:00.51	
19	Talasha Prabhu (IND)	1:01.07	
20	Talita Baqlah (JOR)	1:02.20	
21	Lê Thị Trang (VIE)	1:02.96	

==== 200 m freestyle ====
6 November

Rank	Athlete	Heats	Final
1st place, gold medalist(s)	Yang Chin-kuei (TPE)	2:00.92	1:57.47
2nd place, silver medalist(s)	Natthanan Junkrajang (THA)	2:01.40	1:59.77
3rd place, bronze medalist(s)	Ji Ye-won (KOR)	2:01.85	2:01.67
4	Zhao Yuting (CHN)	2:01.93	2:01.68
5	Ranohon Amanova (UZB)	2:01.79	2:02.66
6	Jiratida Phinyosophon (THA)	2:02.45	2:03.22
7	Yekaterina Gakhokidze (KAZ)	2:04.39	2:03.39
8	Chen Cheng (CHN)	2:04.21	2:15.89
9	Jennifer Town (HKG)	2:04.94	
10	Richa Mishra (IND)	2:05.30	
11	Maftunabonu Tukhtasinova (UZB)	2:06.60	
12	Fong Man Wai (MAC)	2:07.30	
13	Lana Chernyshova (KAZ)	2:07.97	
14	Võ Thị Thanh Vy (VIE)	2:08.25	
15	Sara Hayajna (JOR)	2:09.97	
16	Hsieh Hsin-jung (TPE)	2:10.03	
17	Miriam Hatamleh (JOR)	2:10.65	
18	Shubha Chittaranjan (IND)	2:12.19	
19	Nguyễn Thị Kim Oanh (VIE)	2:13.86	

==== 50 m backstroke ====
5 November

Rank	Athlete	Heats	Final
1st place, gold medalist(s)	Anastassiya Prilepa (KAZ)	28.45	27.85
2nd place, silver medalist(s)	Yekaterina Rudenko (KAZ)	28.82	28.13
3rd place, bronze medalist(s)	Sherry Tsai (HKG)	27.92	28.20
4	Chen Cheng (CHN)	28.73	28.23
5	Kim Ji-hyun (KOR)	29.07	28.59
6	Guo Jiarui (CHN)	29.23	28.78
7	Claudia Lau (HKG)	29.23	29.07
8	Navarat Thongkaew (THA)	29.40	29.47
9	Natthanan Junkrajang (THA)	29.54	
10	Yulduz Kuchkarova (UZB)	29.66	
11	Fong Man Wai (MAC)	29.82	
12	Dương Thị Thơm (VIE)	30.32	
13	Sara Hayajna (JOR)	31.03	
14	Fariha Zaman (IND)	31.18	
15	Bana Batshon (JOR)	31.81	
16	Kim Song-hui (PRK)	32.61	
17	Nguyễn Thị Kim Oanh (VIE)	32.69	
18	Hsieh Hsin-jung (TPE)	33.61	

==== 100 m backstroke ====
6 November

Rank	Athlete	Heats	Final
1st place, gold medalist(s)	Anastassiya Prilepa (KAZ)	1:01.43	1:00.14
2nd place, silver medalist(s)	Sherry Tsai (HKG)	1:01.68	1:00.62
3rd place, bronze medalist(s)	Claudia Lau (HKG)	1:02.79	1:01.26
4	Yekaterina Rudenko (KAZ)	1:02.10	1:01.46
5	Yulduz Kuchkarova (UZB)	1:03.59	1:01.73
6	Kim Ji-hyun (KOR)	1:02.31	1:01.92
7	Xu Huiyi (CHN)	1:02.79	1:02.40
8	Zhao Yuting (CHN)	1:03.99	1:03.66
9	Navarat Thongkaew (THA)	1:05.38	
10	Fong Man Wai (MAC)	1:05.68	
11	Dương Thị Thơm (VIE)	1:06.34	
12	Nathaya Meksamanasak (THA)	1:06.63	
13	Fariha Zaman (IND)	1:07.16	
14	Lin Hsin-lan (TPE)	1:07.81	
15	Richa Mishra (IND)	1:07.94	
16	Sara Hayajna (JOR)	1:08.44	
17	Kim Song-hui (PRK)	1:09.95	
18	Bana Batshon (JOR)	1:10.02	
19	Nguyễn Thị Ngọc Bích (VIE)	1:11.84	

==== 50 m breaststroke ====
7 November

Rank	Athlete	Heats	Final
1st place, gold medalist(s)	Yvette Kong (HKG)	32.78	31.33
2nd place, silver medalist(s)	Yekaterina Sadovnik (KAZ)	32.00	32.01
3rd place, bronze medalist(s)	Yuliya Litvina (KAZ)	32.31	32.16
4	Fiona Ma (HKG)	33.19	32.67
5	Phantira Saraikarn (THA)	33.32	32.95
6	Lei On Kei (MAC)	33.29	33.11
7	Panward Jitpairoj (THA)	33.13	33.31
8	Sin Jin-hui (PRK)	33.20	33.33
9	Bùi Thị Hải Ý (VIE)	33.54	
10	Kim Seul-bee (KOR)	33.66	
11	Vũ Thùy Dương (VIE)	33.73	
12	Hsieh Hsin-jung (TPE)	35.13	
13	Poorva Shetye (IND)	36.10	
14	Lin Hsin-lan (TPE)	36.15	
15	Tian Xinhe (CHN)	36.45	
16	Zhao Yuting (CHN)	37.17	
17	Bana Batshon (JOR)	38.48	

==== 100 m breaststroke ====
4 November

Rank	Athlete	Heats	Final
1st place, gold medalist(s)	Yvette Kong (HKG)	1:10.10	1:06.90
2nd place, silver medalist(s)	Yuliya Litvina (KAZ)	1:10.55	1:08.89
3rd place, bronze medalist(s)	Fiona Ma (HKG)	1:12.92	1:10.09
4	Yekaterina Sadovnik (KAZ)	1:10.93	1:10.12
5	Kim Seul-bee (KOR)	1:11.63	1:11.44
6	Sin Jin-hui (PRK)	1:11.87	1:12.24
7	Phantira Saraikarn (THA)	1:13.34	1:13.34
8	Trần Thị Thuận (VIE)	1:13.35	1:13.91
9	Panward Jitpairoj (THA)	1:13.68	
10	Lei On Kei (MAC)	1:13.72	
11	Zhao Yuting (CHN)	1:14.48	
12	Phạm Thị Huệ (VIE)	1:14.52	
13	Hsieh Hsin-jung (TPE)	1:18.95	
14	Tian Xinhe (CHN)	1:19.62	
15	Poorva Shetye (IND)	1:19.96	
16	Bana Batshon (JOR)	1:24.93	

==== 50 m butterfly ====
6 November

Rank	Athlete	Heats	Final
1st place, gold medalist(s)	Guo Fan (CHN)	26.63	26.08
2nd place, silver medalist(s)	Li Shuang (CHN)	26.99	26.36
3rd place, bronze medalist(s)	Sze Hang Yu (HKG)	26.87	26.61
4	Chan Kin Lok (HKG)	27.35	27.14
5	Elmira Aigaliyeva (KAZ)	27.80	27.33
6	Yang Chin-kuei (TPE)	27.65	27.51
7	An Se-hyeon (KOR)	27.76	27.66
8	Ma Cheok Mei (MAC)	27.88	28.44
9	Natnapa Prommuenwai (THA)	28.57	
10	Shubha Chittaranjan (IND)	28.89	
11	Nathaya Meksamanasak (THA)	28.97	
12	Lana Chernyshova (KAZ)	29.12	
13	Ân Đỗ Hạnh (VIE)	29.23	
14	Talita Baqlah (JOR)	30.00	
15	Tan Chi Yan (MAC)	30.31	
16	Richa Mishra (IND)	30.44	
17	Alfiya Gimaeva (UZB)	32.01	
18	Bana Batshon (JOR)	32.49	

==== 100 m butterfly ====
5 November

Rank	Athlete	Heats	Final
1st place, gold medalist(s)	Guo Fan (CHN)	59.85	57.41
2nd place, silver medalist(s)	Sze Hang Yu (HKG)	58.85	58.14
3rd place, bronze medalist(s)	Li Shuang (CHN)	1:00.08	58.20
4	Yang Chin-kuei (TPE)	1:00.52	59.40
5	Elmira Aigaliyeva (KAZ)	1:01.39	59.83
6	An Se-hyeon (KOR)	1:01.18	1:00.63
7	Jennifer Town (HKG)	1:01.39	1:00.95
8	Ma Cheok Mei (MAC)	1:00.81	1:03.31
9	Natnapa Prommuenwai (THA)	1:02.55	
10	Richa Mishra (IND)	1:03.82	
11	Natsaya Susuk (THA)	1:04.56	
12	Lana Chernyshova (KAZ)	1:04.71	
13	Lin Hsin-lan (TPE)	1:04.74	
14	Vandita Dhariyal (IND)	1:04.82	
15	Nguyễn Thị Ngọc Yến (VIE)	1:06.68	
16	Talita Baqlah (JOR)	1:08.44	

==== 100 m individual medley ====
7 November

Rank	Athlete	Heats	Final
1st place, gold medalist(s)	Elmira Aigaliyeva (KAZ)	1:04.59	1:02.76
2nd place, silver medalist(s)	Sherry Tsai (HKG)	1:05.53	1:02.88
3rd place, bronze medalist(s)	Lee Mi-rim (KOR)	1:04.50	1:03.87
4	Claudia Lau (HKG)	1:05.33	1:04.38
5	Sin Jin-hui (PRK)	1:06.22	1:05.33
6	Tian Xinhe (CHN)	1:06.30	1:05.35
7	Lin Hsin-lan (TPE)	1:07.42	1:06.99
8	Pooja Raghava Alva (IND)	1:07.79	1:07.71
9	Richa Mishra (IND)	1:07.81	
10	Hsieh Hsin-jung (TPE)	1:08.18	
11	Maftunabonu Tukhtasinova (UZB)	1:08.26	
12	Sara Hayajna (JOR)	1:08.40	
13	Nguyễn Thị Kim Oanh (VIE)	1:10.33	
14	Alfiya Gimaeva (UZB)	1:11.21	
15	Talita Baqlah (JOR)	1:12.01	
16	Natthanan Junkrajang (THA)	1:14.99	
17	Phantira Saraikarn (THA)	1:16.40	
18	Guo Fan (CHN)	1:17.20	

==== 200 m individual medley ====
4 November

Rank	Athlete	Heats	Final
1st place, gold medalist(s)	Guo Fan (CHN)	2:16.30	2:12.79
2nd place, silver medalist(s)	Natthanan Junkrajang (THA)	2:17.43	2:13.57
3rd place, bronze medalist(s)	Sherry Tsai (HKG)	2:16.53	2:14.98
4	Elmira Aigaliyeva (KAZ)	2:17.94	2:15.47
5	Chavisa Thaveesupsoonthorn (THA)	2:16.09	2:16.00
6	Ranohon Amanova (UZB)	2:18.20	2:16.58
7	Yang Chin-kuei (TPE)	2:18.14	2:17.28
8	Chan Kin Lok (HKG)	2:18.84	2:17.67
9	Lee Mi-rim (KOR)	2:19.47	
10	Lin Hsin-lan (TPE)	2:20.94	
11	Richa Mishra (IND)	2:22.19	
12	Tian Xinhe (CHN)	2:25.35	
13	Pooja Raghava Alva (IND)	2:26.42	
14	Sara Hayajna (JOR)	2:27.58	
15	Ân Đỗ Hạnh (VIE)	2:28.50	
16	Maftunabonu Tukhtasinova (UZB)	2:28.53	
17	Võ Thị Thanh Vy (VIE)	2:31.66	

==== 4 × 50 m freestyle relay ====
6 November

Rank	Team	Heats	Final
1st place, gold medalist(s)	China (CHN)	1:45.38	1:41.13
2nd place, silver medalist(s)	Hong Kong (HKG)	1:45.97	1:42.38
3rd place, bronze medalist(s)	Kazakhstan (KAZ)	1:46.30	1:43.80
4	South Korea (KOR)	1:48.26	1:47.39
5	Macau (MAC)	1:50.64	1:48.53
6	Uzbekistan (UZB)	1:50.10	1:48.90
7	India (IND)	1:50.21	1:50.48
—	Thailand (THA)	1:45.92	DSQ
9	Jordan (JOR)	1:52.29	
10	Vietnam (VIE)	1:52.69	

==== 4 × 100 m freestyle relay ====
5 November

Rank	Team	Heats	Final
1st place, gold medalist(s)	Hong Kong (HKG)	3:48.73	3:42.13
2nd place, silver medalist(s)	Thailand (THA)	3:51.69	3:44.23
3rd place, bronze medalist(s)	China (CHN)	3:49.21	3:44.40
4	South Korea (KOR)	3:50.95	3:47.47
5	Kazakhstan (KAZ)	3:54.32	3:48.80
6	Uzbekistan (UZB)	3:57.99	3:55.10
7	India (IND)	3:57.90	3:57.67
8	Macau (MAC)	3:57.84	4:12.49
9	Vietnam (VIE)	4:05.52	
10	Jordan (JOR)	4:08.62	

==== 4 × 50 m medley relay ====
4 November

Rank	Team	Heats	Final
1st place, gold medalist(s)	Hong Kong (HKG)	1:55.73	1:50.59
2nd place, silver medalist(s)	China (CHN)	1:56.64	1:52.99
3rd place, bronze medalist(s)	Kazakhstan (KAZ)	1:54.40	1:53.38
4	Thailand (THA)	1:58.26	1:55.05
5	South Korea (KOR)	1:56.09	1:55.22
6	Macau (MAC)	2:00.11	2:00.49
7	Vietnam (VIE)	2:01.89	2:01.15
8	India (IND)	2:03.68	2:02.20
9	Uzbekistan (UZB)	2:04.07	
10	Jordan (JOR)	2:06.71	

==== 4 × 100 m medley relay ====
7 November

Rank	Team	Heats	Final
1st place, gold medalist(s)	Hong Kong (HKG)	4:15.50	4:00.81
2nd place, silver medalist(s)	Kazakhstan (KAZ)	4:11.21	4:04.02
3rd place, bronze medalist(s)	China (CHN)	4:15.68	4:04.40
4	South Korea (KOR)	4:15.45	4:10.70
5	Thailand (THA)	4:18.26	4:17.64
6	Macau (MAC)	4:22.11	4:26.67
7	Vietnam (VIE)	4:36.28	4:29.03
8	Jordan (JOR)	4:41.27	4:38.76
9	India (IND)	4:43.75	
—	Uzbekistan (UZB)	DSQ	
