= Short course swimming at the 2007 Asian Indoor Games =

- Venue: Macau Olympic Aquatic Centre
- Dates: 30 October – 2 November 2007

Short course swimming at the 2007 Asian Indoor Games was held in Macau Olympic Aquatic Centre, Macau, China from 30 October to 2 November 2007.

== Medalists ==
=== Men ===
Event	Gold		Silver		Bronze	
50 m freestyle	Arwut Chinnapasaen; Thailand	22.81	Liu Yu; China	22.86	Li Yujun; China	22.88
100 m freestyle	Liu Yu; China	49.79	Vasilii Danilov; Kyrgyzstan	49.98	Alexandr Sklyar; Kazakhstan	50.16
200 m freestyle	Liu Runliang; China	1:49.88	Oleg Rabota; Kazakhstan	1:50.21	Hwang Jun-ho; South Korea	1:50.72
50 m backstroke	Lin Yi; China	25.91	Stanislav Ossinskiy; Kazakhstan	25.96	Geoffrey Cheah; Hong Kong	25.97
100 m backstroke	Stanislav Ossinskiy; Kazakhstan	55.30	Lin Yi; China	56.00	Geoffrey Cheah; Hong Kong	56.10
50 m breaststroke	Mohammad Alirezaei; Iran	28.35	Sandeep Sejwal; India	28.41	Vorrawuti Aumpiwan; Thailand	28.49
100 m breaststroke	Wang Wei-wen; Chinese Taipei	1:01.78	Sandeep Sejwal; India	1:01.99	Yevgeniy Ryzhkov; Kazakhstan	1:02.07
50 m butterfly	Zhou Jiawei; China	23.97; GR	Rustam Khudiyev; Kazakhstan	24.12	Victor Wong; Macau	24.14
100 m butterfly	Zhou Jiawei; China	51.91; GR	Victor Wong; Macau	52.78	Rustam Khudiyev; Kazakhstan	53.33
100 m individual medley	Radomyos Matjiur; Thailand	55.61; GR	Wang Wei-wen; Chinese Taipei	57.04	Shared silver	
100 m individual medley	Radomyos Matjiur; Thailand	55.61; GR	Artur Dilman; Kazakhstan	57.04	Shared silver	
200 m individual medley	Radomyos Matjiur; Thailand	2:01.35; GR	Dmitriy Gordiyenko; Kazakhstan	2:02.66	Artur Dilman; Kazakhstan	2:03.18
4 × 50 m freestyle relay	China; Zhang Fangqiang; Liu Yu; Liu Runliang; Li Yujun	1:29.79; GR	Kazakhstan; Rustam Khudiyev; Alexandr Sklyar; Stanislav Kuzmin; Vyacheslav Titarenko	1:30.48	Thailand; Arwut Chinnapasaen; Kanapol Sirivadhanakul; Vorrawuti Aumpiwan; Radomyos Matjiur	1:31.93
4 × 100 m freestyle relay	Kazakhstan; Artur Dilman; Alexandr Sklyar; Vyacheslav Titarenko; Stanislav Kuzmin	3:20.04; GR	China; Zhang Fangqiang; Wang Ximing; Zhang Xuanho; Liu Runliang	3:24.06	Hong Kong; Andres Tung; Yan Ho Chun; Lum Ching Tat; Geoffrey Cheah	3:24.46
4 × 50 m medley relay	China; Lin Yi; Long Fazhong; Zhou Jiawei; Liu Yu	1:39.16	Kazakhstan; Stanislav Ossinskiy; Yevgeniy Ryzhkov; Rustam Khudiyev; Stanislav Kuzmin	1:40.86	Thailand; Suriya Suksuphak; Vorrawuti Aumpiwan; Radomyos Matjiur; Arwut Chinnapasaen	1:41.55
4 × 100 m medley relay	China; Lin Yi; Long Fazhong; Zhou Jiawei; Zhang Fangqiang	3:37.85	Kazakhstan; Stanislav Ossinskiy; Yevgeniy Ryzhkov; Rustam Khudiyev; Alexandr Sklyar	3:38.31	Macau; Antonio Tong; Ma Chan Wai; Victor Wong; Lao Kuan Fong	3:44.94

=== Women ===
Event	Gold		Silver		Bronze	
50 m freestyle	Wu Binan; China	25.68	Sze Hang Yu; Hong Kong	25.75	Lee Jae-young; South Korea	25.77
100 m freestyle	Hannah Wilson; Hong Kong	55.17; GR	Lee Jae-young; South Korea	55.79	Wu Binan; China	56.98
200 m freestyle	Natthanan Junkrajang; Thailand	2:01.31	Lee Jae-young; South Korea	2:01.61	Jennifer Town; Hong Kong	2:05.50
50 m backstroke	Sherry Tsai; Hong Kong	28.08; GR	Anastassiya Prilepa; Kazakhstan	28.97	Stephanie Au; Hong Kong	29.00
100 m backstroke	Sherry Tsai; Hong Kong	1:00.18; GR	Stephanie Au; Hong Kong	1:01.39	Chen Xiujun; China	1:01.90
50 m breaststroke	Lim Su-young; South Korea	32.22; GR	Tan Jingwen; China	32.37	Suen Ka Yi; Hong Kong	32.84
100 m breaststroke	Lim Su-young; South Korea	1:09.79; GR	Liu Shuyuan; China	1:10.78	Tan Jingwen; China	1:10.80
50 m butterfly	Sze Hang Yu; Hong Kong	27.16; GR	Hannah Wilson; Hong Kong	27.41	Park Hyun-jung; South Korea	28.15
100 m butterfly	Hannah Wilson; Hong Kong	1:00.06; GR	Sze Hang Yu; Hong Kong	1:00.26	Natnapa Prommuenwai; Thailand	1:02.00
100 m individual medley	Sherry Tsai; Hong Kong	1:02.49; GR	Sze Hang Yu; Hong Kong	1:04.02	Natthanan Junkrajang; Thailand	1:04.86
200 m individual medley	Sherry Tsai; Hong Kong	2:13.95; GR	Natthanan Junkrajang; Thailand	2:17.82	Lee Soo-jung; South Korea	2:17.98
4 × 50 m freestyle relay	Hong Kong; Sherry Tsai; Sze Hang Yu; Stephanie Au; Hannah Wilson	1:42.16; GR	Thailand; Natthanan Junkrajang; Pannika Prachgosin; Natnapa Prommuenwai; Jiratida Phinyosophon	1:45.18	China; Cheng Feng; Liu Shuyuan; Guo Shiqi; Wu Binan	1:46.17
4 × 100 m freestyle relay	Hong Kong; Sherry Tsai; Sze Hang Yu; Hannah Wilson; Stephanie Au	3:43.17; GR	Thailand; Natthanan Junkrajang; Rutai Santadvatana; Pannika Prachgosin; Jiratida Phinyosophon	3:47.15	South Korea; Lim Su-young; Lee Soo-jung; Kim Yu-yon; Lee Jae-young	3:53.34
4 × 50 m medley relay	Hong Kong; Sherry Tsai; Suen Ka Yi; Sze Hang Yu; Hannah Wilson	1:53.10; GR	South Korea; Kim Yu-yon; Lim Su-young; Park Hyun-jung; Lee Jae-young	1:54.52	China; Chen Xiujun; Tan Jingwen; Guo Shiqi; Wu Binan	1:54.89
4 × 100 m medley relay	Hong Kong; Sherry Tsai; Suen Ka Yi; Hannah Wilson; Stephanie Au	4:07.84; GR	South Korea; Kim Yu-yon; Lim Su-young; Park Hyun-jung; Lee Jae-young	4:10.74	China; Chen Xiujun; Liu Shuyuan; Guo Shiqi; Wu Binan	4:12.72

== Medal table ==
Rank	Nation	Gold	Silver	Bronze	Total
1	Hong Kong (HKG)	11	5	6	22
2	China (CHN)	9	5	7	21
3	Thailand (THA)	4	3	5	12
4	Kazakhstan (KAZ)	2	9	4	15
5	South Korea (KOR)	2	4	5	11
6	Chinese Taipei (TPE)	1	1	0	2
7	Iran (IRI)	1	0	0	1
8	India (IND)	0	2	0	2
9	Macau (MAC)	0	1	2	3
10	Kyrgyzstan (KGZ)	0	1	0	1
Totals (10 entries)		30	31	29	90

== Results ==
=== Men ===
==== 50 m freestyle ====
30 October

Rank	Athlete	Heats	Final
1st place, gold medalist(s)	Arwut Chinnapasaen (THA)	22.95	22.81
2nd place, silver medalist(s)	Liu Yu (CHN)	23.47	22.86
3rd place, bronze medalist(s)	Li Yujun (CHN)	23.19	22.88
4	Alexandr Sklyar (KAZ)	23.04	22.99
5	Lao Kuan Fong (MAC)	23.19	23.29
6	Mohammad Bidarian (IRI)	23.44	23.42
7	Yan Ho Chun (HKG)	23.42	23.50
8	Hamid Reza Mobarrez (IRI)	23.43	23.51
9	Kanapol Sirivadhanakul (THA)	23.71	
10	Lum Ching Tat (HKG)	23.75	
11	Guntur Pratama Putra (INA)	23.99	
12	Ernest Teo (SIN)	24.10	
13	Hwang Jun-ho (KOR)	24.14	
14	Jan Michael Chiu (PHI)	24.21	
15	Evan Brian Uy (PHI)	24.22	
16	Nguyễn Ngọc Quang Bảo (VIE)	24.24	
17	Kareem Ennab (JOR)	24.30	
18	Anas Hamadeh (JOR)	24.42	
19	Loai Tashkandi (KSA)	24.92	
20	Joel Lim (SIN)	25.01	
21	Mohammed Zaidan Hashim (QAT)	25.15	
22	Cheong Wui Chon (MAC)	25.22	
23	Hazem Tashkandi (KSA)	25.56	
24	Tarek El-Kaaki (LIB)	25.94	
25	Sulaiman Al-Humoud (KUW)	26.56	
26	Makram Fatoul (LIB)	26.72	
27	Ahmed Atari (QAT)	29.36	
28	Abdulsalam Abdullah Ahmed (YEM)	30.46	
—	Andryein Tamir (MGL)	DNS	

==== 100 m freestyle ====
2 November

Rank	Athlete	Heats	Final
1st place, gold medalist(s)	Liu Yu (CHN)	51.78	49.79
2nd place, silver medalist(s)	Vasilii Danilov (KGZ)	51.68	49.98
3rd place, bronze medalist(s)	Alexandr Sklyar (KAZ)	50.90	50.16
4	Liu Runliang (CHN)	52.42	50.58
5	Mohammad Bidarian (IRI)	51.44	50.87
6	Stanislav Kuzmin (KAZ)	50.60	50.93
7	Andres Tung (HKG)	52.42	51.61
8	Lao Kuan Fong (MAC)	52.49	53.06
9	Pasha Vahdati (IRI)	52.53	
10	Hwang Jun-ho (KOR)	52.57	
11	Geoffrey Cheah (HKG)	52.61	
12	Jan Michael Chiu (PHI)	52.87	
13	Joel Lim (SIN)	52.91	
14	Nguyễn Ngọc Quang Bảo (VIE)	53.00	
15	Anas Hamadeh (JOR)	53.05	
16	Guntur Pratama Putra (INA)	53.12	
17	Ernest Teo (SIN)	53.85	
18	Antonio Lao (MAC)	54.33	
19	Evan Brian Uy (PHI)	54.47	
20	Mohammed Zaidan Hashim (QAT)	55.13	
21	Andryein Tamir (MGL)	55.44	
22	Tarek El-Kaaki (LIB)	57.03	
23	Makram Fatoul (LIB)	58.55	
24	Abdulrahman Issa (QAT)	59.90	
—	Kareem Ennab (JOR)	DSQ	
—	Abdulsalam Abdullah Ahmed (YEM)	DSQ	

==== 200 m freestyle ====
1 November

Rank	Athlete	Heats	Final
1st place, gold medalist(s)	Liu Runliang (CHN)	1:53.15	1:49.88
2nd place, silver medalist(s)	Oleg Rabota (KAZ)	1:52.32	1:50.21
3rd place, bronze medalist(s)	Hwang Jun-ho (KOR)	1:52.70	1:50.72
4	Tang Sheng-chieh (TPE)	1:53.23	1:51.06
5	Vasilii Danilov (KGZ)	1:52.64	1:51.86
6	Cheung Siu Hang (HKG)	1:52.90	1:53.14
7	Kittipong Kotarapakdee (THA)	1:53.93	1:53.97
8	Emin Noshadi (IRI)	1:53.42	1:54.03
9	Nguyễn Ngọc Quang Bảo (VIE)	1:54.82	
10	Rehan Poncha (IND)	1:54.89	
11	Zhang Xuanhao (CHN)	1:54.96	
12	Lum Ching Tat (HKG)	1:55.13	
13	Anas Hamadeh (JOR)	1:56.64	
14	Hoàng Quý Phước (VIE)	1:56.95	
15	Joel Lim (SIN)	1:57.93	
16	Evan Brian Uy (PHI)	1:58.71	
17	Kusadewa Pratama Arnooczy (INA)	1:59.44	
18	Rainer Ng (SIN)	1:59.57	
19	Antonio Lao (MAC)	2:02.22	
20	Sulaiman Al-Humoud (KUW)	2:06.42	
21	Cheang Weng San (MAC)	2:06.90	
22	Makram Fatoul (LIB)	2:09.76	
23	Abdulrahman Al-Ollan (QAT)	2:12.57	
24	Abdulrahman Issa (QAT)	2:13.55	
25	Mahmoud Daaboul (LIB)	2:15.89	

==== 50 m backstroke ====
31 October

Rank	Athlete	Heats	Final
1st place, gold medalist(s)	Lin Yi (CHN)	26.43	25.91
2nd place, silver medalist(s)	Stanislav Ossinskiy (KAZ)	25.99	25.96
3rd place, bronze medalist(s)	Geoffrey Cheah (HKG)	26.26	25.97
4	Philip Yee (HKG)	26.81	26.32
5	Park Seon-kwan (KOR)	26.49	26.47
6	Artur Dilman (KAZ)	26.95	26.66
7	Chen Cheng (CHN)	26.80	26.79
8	Iurii Zakharov (KGZ)	27.06	26.94
9	Lei Chi Lon (MAC)	27.18	
10	Antonio Tong (MAC)	27.47	
11	Rainer Ng (SIN)	27.66	
12	Harizal (INA)	27.74	
13	Nguyễn Ngọc Quang Bảo (VIE)	27.85	
14	Aiman Al-Kulaibi (OMA)	27.93	
15	Shahin Baradaran (IRI)	28.18	
16	Evan Brian Uy (PHI)	28.62	
17	Hoàng Quý Phước (VIE)	28.78	
18	Mohammed Zaidan Hashim (QAT)	29.11	
19	Suriya Suksuphak (THA)	29.52	
20	Tarek El-Kaaki (LIB)	30.37	
21	Nadim Barakat (LIB)	32.27	
22	Mohammed Najib (YEM)	35.99	
23	Buyankhishigiin Bilgüitei (MGL)	37.67	
24	Bayarsaikhany Maralbayar (MGL)	40.86	

==== 100 m backstroke ====
1 November

Rank	Athlete	Heats	Final
1st place, gold medalist(s)	Stanislav Ossinskiy (KAZ)	57.53	55.30
2nd place, silver medalist(s)	Lin Yi (CHN)	57.82	56.00
3rd place, bronze medalist(s)	Geoffrey Cheah (HKG)	56.86	56.10
4	Rehan Poncha (IND)	57.38	56.45
5	Iurii Zakharov (KGZ)	57.91	56.83
6	Park Seon-kwan (KOR)	58.00	56.84
7	Philip Yee (HKG)	57.89	57.19
8	Oleg Rabota (KAZ)	57.74	58.47
9	Antonio Tong (MAC)	58.27	
10	Aiman Al-Kulaibi (OMA)	58.57	
11	Rainer Ng (SIN)	59.44	
12	Lei Chi Lon (MAC)	59.54	
13	Shahin Baradaran (IRI)	59.70	
14	Yousuf Al-Yousuf (KSA)	1:00.01	
15	Suriya Suksuphak (THA)	1:00.26	
16	Hoàng Quý Phước (VIE)	1:00.84	
17	Harizal (INA)	1:00.87	
18	Chen Cheng (CHN)	1:02.84	
19	Tarek El-Kaaki (LIB)	1:05.97	
20	Radomyos Matjiur (THA)	1:06.96	
21	Abdulrahman Issa (QAT)	1:08.25	
22	Nadim Barakat (LIB)	1:10.05	
23	Mohammed Najib (YEM)	1:18.46	

==== 50 m breaststroke ====
31 October

Rank	Athlete	Heats	Final
1st place, gold medalist(s)	Mohammad Alirezaei (IRI)	28.70	28.35
2nd place, silver medalist(s)	Sandeep Sejwal (IND)	28.82	28.41
3rd place, bronze medalist(s)	Vorrawuti Aumpiwan (THA)	28.60	28.49
4	Ahmed Al-Kudmani (KSA)	28.86	28.56
5	Ma Chan Wai (MAC)	29.02	28.79
6	Ruan Zhangwen (CHN)	29.39	29.10
7	Anatoliy Timchenko (KAZ)	29.33	29.12
8	Wei Hansheng (CHN)	29.26	29.44
9	Wang Wei-wen (TPE)	29.46	
10	Yevgeniy Ryzhkov (KAZ)	29.49	
11	Eric Chan (HKG)	29.84	
12	Choi Kyu-woong (KOR)	29.94	
13	Yousuf Al-Yousuf (KSA)	30.12	
14	Ng Jia Hao (SIN)	30.35	
15	Wong Ho Long (MAC)	30.44	
16	Mohamad Idham Dasuki (INA)	30.73	
17	Saad Al-Naser (JOR)	30.97	
18	Sio Kin Hei (MAC)	32.22	
19	Guwanç Ataniýazow (TKM)	32.42	
20	Ahmed Atari (QAT)	37.22	
21	Buyankhishigiin Bilgüitei (MGL)	38.60	
22	Bayarsaikhany Maralbayar (MGL)	39.91	

==== 100 m breaststroke ====
30 October

Rank	Athlete	Heats	Final
1st place, gold medalist(s)	Wang Wei-wen (TPE)	1:02.25	1:01.78
2nd place, silver medalist(s)	Sandeep Sejwal (IND)	1:03.50	1:01.99
3rd place, bronze medalist(s)	Yevgeniy Ryzhkov (KAZ)	1:02.57	1:02.07
4	Anatoliy Timchenko (KAZ)	1:02.45	1:02.11
5	Long Fazhong (CHN)	1:03.04	1:02.29
6	Vorrawuti Aumpiwan (THA)	1:02.61	1:02.69
7	Mohammad Alirezaei (IRI)	1:03.70	1:03.98
7	Choi Kyu-woong (KOR)	1:04.09	1:03.98
9	Ma Chan Wai (MAC)	1:04.75	
10	Eric Chan (HKG)	1:05.12	
11	Wong Ho Long (MAC)	1:05.19	
12	Mohamad Idham Dasuki (INA)	1:05.60	
13	Ng Jia Hao (SIN)	1:06.00	
14	Saad Al-Naser (JOR)	1:08.25	
15	Guwanç Ataniýazow (TKM)	1:10.79	
16	Chou Kit (MAC)	1:11.33	
17	Ahmed Atari (QAT)	1:23.39	

==== 50 m butterfly ====
1 November

Rank	Athlete	Heats	Final
1st place, gold medalist(s)	Zhou Jiawei (CHN)	24.09	23.97
2nd place, silver medalist(s)	Rustam Khudiyev (KAZ)	24.34	24.12
3rd place, bronze medalist(s)	Victor Wong (MAC)	24.35	24.14
4	Stanislav Kuzmin (KAZ)	24.92	24.50
5	Guntur Pratama Putra (INA)	25.61	25.34
6	Seo Ji-hun (KOR)	25.63	25.36
7	Hamid Reza Mobarrez (IRI)	25.42	25.46
8	Wang Wei-wen (TPE)	25.63	25.63
9	David Wong (HKG)	25.64	
10	Iurii Zakharov (KGZ)	25.80	
11	Hsu Chi-chieh (TPE)	25.96	
12	Harizal (INA)	26.15	
13	Marcus Josef Lee (SIN)	26.19	
14	Kareem Ennab (JOR)	26.21	
15	Ng Jia Hao (SIN)	26.36	
16	Andres Tung (HKG)	26.49	
17	Jan Michael Chiu (PHI)	26.55	
18	Lou Keng Ip (MAC)	27.03	
19	Loai Tashkandi (KSA)	27.25	
20	Evan Brian Uy (PHI)	27.29	
21	Nather Al-Hamoud (KSA)	27.39	
22	Li Yujun (CHN)	27.41	
23	Makram Fatoul (LIB)	28.90	
24	Georges Fatoul (LIB)	29.48	
25	Mohammed Najib (YEM)	33.22	
—	Abdulrahman Al-Ollan (QAT)	DNS	
—	Enkhtaivany Battushig (MGL)	DNS	
—	Anas Hamadeh (JOR)	DNS	

==== 100 m butterfly ====
31 October

Rank	Athlete	Heats	Final
1st place, gold medalist(s)	Zhou Jiawei (CHN)	53.94	51.91
2nd place, silver medalist(s)	Victor Wong (MAC)	54.14	52.78
3rd place, bronze medalist(s)	Rustam Khudiyev (KAZ)	54.15	53.33
4	Linghu Ziyuan (CHN)	55.53	55.18
5	Hsu Chi-chieh (TPE)	55.35	55.21
6	Seo Ji-hun (KOR)	55.99	55.39
7	David Wong (HKG)	55.95	55.47
8	Rehan Poncha (IND)	56.40	56.00
9	Marcus Josef Lee (SIN)	57.72	
10	Radomyos Matjiur (THA)	57.81	
11	Harizal (INA)	57.92	
12	Tang Sheng-chieh (TPE)	57.93	
13	Anas Hamadeh (JOR)	58.33	
14	Kareem Ennab (JOR)	58.75	
15	Jan Michael Chiu (PHI)	59.07	
16	Nather Al-Hamoud (KSA)	1:00.22	
17	Hazem Tashkandi (KSA)	1:00.80	
18	Lei Hong Nam (MAC)	1:01.34	
19	Abdulrahman Issa (QAT)	1:06.21	
20	Abdulrahman Al-Ollan (QAT)	1:07.22	
21	Hamid Reza Mobarrez (IRI)	1:07.63	
22	Georges Fatoul (LIB)	1:08.66	
23	Nadim Barakat (LIB)	1:21.13	
—	Stanislav Kuzmin (KAZ)	DSQ	
—	Enkhtaivany Battushig (MGL)	DNS	

==== 100 m individual medley ====
2 November

Rank	Athlete	Heats	Final
1st place, gold medalist(s)	Radomyos Matjiur (THA)	57.15	55.61
2nd place, silver medalist(s)	Wang Wei-wen (TPE)	57.03	57.04
2nd place, silver medalist(s)	Artur Dilman (KAZ)	57.96	57.04
4	Victor Wong (MAC)	57.63	57.05
5	Dmitriy Gordiyenko (KAZ)	57.43	57.12
6	Pathunyu Yimsomruay (THA)	57.55	57.55
7	Kim Ming-yu (KOR)	58.47	57.77
8	Iurii Zakharov (KGZ)	57.99	57.88
9	Lum Ching Tat (HKG)	58.65	
10	Rehan Poncha (IND)	58.72	
11	Yuan Haopeng (CHN)	59.02	
12	Wang Shang (CHN)	59.60	
13	Nguyễn Ngọc Quang Bảo (VIE)	59.73	
14	Shahin Baradaran (IRI)	59.83	
15	Tang Sheng-chieh (TPE)	1:00.00	
16	Cheung Siu Hang (HKG)	1:00.45	
17	Aiman Al-Kulaibi (OMA)	1:01.99	
18	Mohamad Idham Dasuki (INA)	1:02.00	
19	Pang Sheng Jun (SIN)	1:02.70	
20	Rainer Ng (SIN)	1:02.76	
21	Saad Al-Naser (JOR)	1:04.26	
22	Cheang Weng San (MAC)	1:06.29	
23	Evan Brian Uy (PHI)	1:08.09	
24	Georges Fatoul (LIB)	1:09.10	
25	Abdulrahman Al-Ollan (QAT)	1:09.14	
26	Nadim Barakat (LIB)	1:11.19	
27	Ahmed Atari (QAT)	1:16.27	
—	Andryein Tamir (MGL)	DNS	
—	Hazem Tashkandi (KSA)	DNS	
—	Yousuf Al-Yousuf (KSA)	DNS	

==== 200 m individual medley ====
30 October

Rank	Athlete	Heats	Final
1st place, gold medalist(s)	Radomyos Matjiur (THA)	2:05.86	2:01.35
2nd place, silver medalist(s)	Dmitriy Gordiyenko (KAZ)	2:04.61	2:02.66
3rd place, bronze medalist(s)	Artur Dilman (KAZ)	2:05.97	2:03.18
4	Vasilii Danilov (KGZ)	2:05.95	2:03.69
5	Rehan Poncha (IND)	2:05.61	2:04.23
6	Tang Sheng-chieh (TPE)	2:05.79	2:04.29
7	Nguyễn Ngọc Quang Bảo (VIE)	2:06.53	2:06.92
8	Long Fazhong (CHN)	2:05.71	2:13.12
9	Iurii Zakharov (KGZ)	2:06.85	
10	Kim Ming-yu (KOR)	2:06.95	
11	Hsu Chi-chieh (TPE)	2:07.10	
12	Wang Ximing (CHN)	2:07.31	
13	Pathunyu Yimsomruay (THA)	2:08.57	
14	Yousuf Al-Yousuf (KSA)	2:10.76	
15	Cheung Siu Hang (HKG)	2:10.96	
16	Pang Sheng Jun (SIN)	2:14.25	
17	Lei Hong Nam (MAC)	2:14.56	
18	Rainer Ng (SIN)	2:14.62	
19	Mohamad Idham Dasuki (INA)	2:15.76	
20	Chan Him Fai (MAC)	2:18.48	
21	Georges Fatoul (LIB)	2:27.84	
22	Abdulrahman Issa (QAT)	2:32.83	
23	Abdulrahman Al-Ollan (QAT)	2:33.95	
24	Mahmoud Daaboul (LIB)	2:40.71	

==== 4 × 50 m freestyle relay ====
1 November

Rank	Team	Heats	Final
1st place, gold medalist(s)	China (CHN)	1:32.88	1:29.79
2nd place, silver medalist(s)	Kazakhstan (KAZ)	1:32.84	1:30.48
3rd place, bronze medalist(s)	Thailand (THA)	1:33.73	1:31.93
4	Hong Kong (HKG)	1:34.19	1:32.05
5	Iran (IRI)	1:34.73	1:32.54
6	South Korea (KOR)	1:36.11	1:35.47
7	Macau (MAC)	1:36.88	1:35.63
8	Singapore (SIN)	1:37.65	1:35.64
9	Indonesia (INA)	1:39.90	
10	Saudi Arabia (KSA)	1:41.19	
11	Lebanon (LIB)	1:48.30	

==== 4 × 100 m freestyle relay ====
31 October

Rank	Team	Heats	Final
1st place, gold medalist(s)	Kazakhstan (KAZ)	3:22.92	3:20.04
2nd place, silver medalist(s)	China (CHN)	3:33.03	3:24.06
3rd place, bronze medalist(s)	Hong Kong (HKG)	3:29.81	3:24.46
4	Iran (IRI)	3:26.70	3:25.69
5	South Korea (KOR)	3:29.82	3:28.28
6	Thailand (THA)	3:32.51	3:28.36
7	Singapore (SIN)	3:37.74	3:33.81
8	Macau (MAC)	3:38.97	3:43.22
9	Indonesia (INA)	3:39.18	
10	Lebanon (LIB)	4:02.27	

==== 4 × 50 m medley relay ====
30 October

Rank	Team	Heats	Final
1st place, gold medalist(s)	China (CHN)	1:42.50	1:39.16
2nd place, silver medalist(s)	Kazakhstan (KAZ)	1:41.56	1:40.86
3rd place, bronze medalist(s)	Thailand (THA)	1:43.75	1:41.55
4	Macau (MAC)	1:43.56	1:41.66
5	Hong Kong (HKG)	1:44.46	1:42.94
6	Iran (IRI)	1:44.11	1:43.36
7	South Korea (KOR)	1:45.04	1:44.28
8	Saudi Arabia (KSA)	1:47.29	1:48.04
9	Indonesia (INA)	1:47.92	
10	Singapore (SIN)	1:47.95	
11	Lebanon (LIB)	2:04.56	

==== 4 × 100 m medley relay ====
2 November

Rank	Team	Heats	Final
1st place, gold medalist(s)	China (CHN)	3:54.49	3:37.85
2nd place, silver medalist(s)	Kazakhstan (KAZ)	3:51.80	3:38.31
3rd place, bronze medalist(s)	Macau (MAC)	4:01.46	3:44.94
4	Thailand (THA)	3:54.19	3:46.00
5	Hong Kong (HKG)	3:52.88	3:47.74
6	Iran (IRI)	3:52.23	3:49.78
7	Singapore (SIN)	3:58.82	3:52.81
8	Indonesia (INA)	4:00.05	3:57.51
9	Lebanon (LIB)	4:51.81	
—	South Korea (KOR)	DSQ	

=== Women ===
==== 50 m freestyle ====
30 October

Rank	Athlete	Heats	Final
1st place, gold medalist(s)	Wu Binan (CHN)	25.84	25.68
2nd place, silver medalist(s)	Sze Hang Yu (HKG)	25.90	25.75
3rd place, bronze medalist(s)	Lee Jae-young (KOR)	26.20	25.77
4	Hannah Wilson (HKG)	26.16	25.87
5	Shikha Tandon (IND)	26.43	26.22
6	Guo Shiqi (CHN)	26.93	26.28
7	Pannika Prachgosin (THA)	27.13	26.36
8	Thida Tonpongsathorn (THA)	27.35 ^{(27.27)}	27.45
9	Ân Đỗ Hạnh (VIE)	27.35 ^{(27.41)}	
10	Anastassiya Prilepa (KAZ)	27.39	
11	Ma Cheok Mei (MAC)	27.43	
12	Yekaterina Gakhokidze (KAZ)	27.55	
13	Ho Shu Yong (SIN)	27.73	
14	Enny Susilowati (INA)	28.04	
15	Miriam Hatamleh (JOR)	28.12	
16	Kou Weng Cheong (MAC)	28.13	
17	Razan Taha (JOR)	28.28	
18	Richa Mishra (IND)	28.32	
19	Nguyễn Bảo Linh (VIE)	28.79	
20	Bianca Elinor Uy (PHI)	28.96	
21	Dashtserengiin Saintsetseg (MGL)	29.65	
22	Khürelbaataryn Sainzayaa (MGL)	31.19	
23	Mirella Alam (LIB)	31.60	

==== 100 m freestyle ====
2 November

Rank	Athlete	Heats	Final
1st place, gold medalist(s)	Hannah Wilson (HKG)	56.48	55.17
2nd place, silver medalist(s)	Lee Jae-young (KOR)	56.49	55.79
3rd place, bronze medalist(s)	Wu Binan (CHN)	57.27	56.98
4	Jiratida Phinyosophon (THA)	58.77	57.10
5	Lee Leong Kwai (HKG)	57.70	57.28
6	Ma Cheok Mei (MAC)	59.12	58.33
7	Ho Shu Yong (SIN)	59.99	58.89
8	Yekaterina Gakhokidze (KAZ)	1:00.20	59.79
9	Natthanan Junkrajang (THA)	58.91	
10	Shikha Tandon (IND)	1:00.36	
11	Cheng Wen (CHN)	1:00.69	
12	Che Lok In (MAC)	1:00.71	
13	Ân Đỗ Hạnh (VIE)	1:00.99	
14	Miriam Hatamleh (JOR)	1:01.14	
15	Enny Susilowati (INA)	1:01.19	
16	Razan Taha (JOR)	1:02.06	
17	Bianca Elinor Uy (PHI)	1:02.55	
18	Ressa Kania Dewi (INA)	1:03.09	
19	Dashtserengiin Saintsetseg (MGL)	1:03.56	
20	Nguyễn Bảo Linh (VIE)	1:04.75	
21	Maria Abou Nader (LIB)	1:10.20	

==== 200 m freestyle ====
1 November

Rank	Athlete	Heats	Final
1st place, gold medalist(s)	Natthanan Junkrajang (THA)	2:05.74	2:01.31
2nd place, silver medalist(s)	Lee Jae-young (KOR)	2:06.36	2:01.61
3rd place, bronze medalist(s)	Jennifer Town (HKG)	2:08.86	2:05.50
4	Fong Man Wai (MAC)	2:06.66	2:07.08
5	Christel Fung (SIN)	2:09.24	2:07.10
6	Fung Wing Yan (HKG)	2:07.21	2:08.15
7	Cheng Wen (CHN)	2:08.41	2:08.61
8	Che Lok In (MAC)	2:09.55	2:09.76
9	Anna Muratova (KAZ)	2:09.86	
10	Liu Shuang (CHN)	2:10.05	
11	Yekaterina Kolyagina (KAZ)	2:10.42	
12	Ân Đỗ Hạnh (VIE)	2:10.68	
13	Richa Mishra (IND)	2:10.87	
14	Tan Pei Shan (SIN)	2:11.44	
15	Miriam Hatamleh (JOR)	2:11.80	
16	Ressa Kania Dewi (INA)	2:13.62	
17	Heba Bashouti (JOR)	2:17.96	
18	Wanitcha Wiriyakitapatana (THA)	2:18.40	
19	Enny Susilowati (INA)	2:18.80	
20	Bianca Elinor Uy (PHI)	2:19.07	

==== 50 m backstroke ====
31 October

Rank	Athlete	Heats	Final
1st place, gold medalist(s)	Sherry Tsai (HKG)	28.18	28.08
2nd place, silver medalist(s)	Anastassiya Prilepa (KAZ)	29.56	28.97
3rd place, bronze medalist(s)	Stephanie Au (HKG)	29.02	29.00
4	Chen Xiujun (CHN)	29.58	29.26
5	Kim Yu-yon (KOR)	29.80	29.54
6	Guo Shiqi (CHN)	30.24	30.04
7	Shikha Tandon (IND)	30.85	30.50
8	Porntip Smithsarakarn (THA)	30.33	30.54
9	Natthanan Junkrajang (THA)	30.53	
10	Kuan Weng I (MAC)	31.44	
11	Enny Susilowati (INA)	31.61	
12	Kou Weng Cheong (MAC)	32.52	
13	Yessi Venisa Yosaputra (INA)	33.17	
14	Bianca Elinor Uy (PHI)	33.32	
15	Batkhuyagiin Enkhjargal (MGL)	36.11	
16	Khürelbaataryn Sainzayaa (MGL)	36.91	
17	Maria Abou Nader (LIB)	37.81	
—	Layla Ghul (JOR)	DNS	

==== 100 m backstroke ====
1 November

Rank	Athlete	Heats	Final
1st place, gold medalist(s)	Sherry Tsai (HKG)	1:03.13	1:00.18
2nd place, silver medalist(s)	Stephanie Au (HKG)	1:04.22	1:01.39
3rd place, bronze medalist(s)	Chen Xiujun (CHN)	1:03.76	1:01.90
4	Kim Yu-yon (KOR)	1:03.87	1:02.39
5	Anastassiya Prilepa (KAZ)	1:04.36	1:03.02
6	Wenika Kaewchaiwong (THA)	1:04.37	1:04.14
7	Shikha Tandon (IND)	1:06.16	1:06.54
8	Anna Muratova (KAZ)	1:06.71	1:06.76
9	Porntip Smithsarakarn (THA)	1:06.90	
10	Kuan Weng I (MAC)	1:07.24	
11	Fong Man Wai (MAC)	1:07.42	
12	Layla Ghul (JOR)	1:08.39	
13	Yessi Venisa Yosaputra (INA)	1:09.59	
14	Enny Susilowati (INA)	1:09.63	
15	Cheng Feng (CHN)	1:09.68	
16	Bianca Elinor Uy (PHI)	1:13.06	
17	Haya Ghul (JOR)	1:16.57	
18	Maria Abou Nader (LIB)	1:21.11	

==== 50 m breaststroke ====
2 November

Rank	Athlete	Heats	Final
1st place, gold medalist(s)	Lim Su-young (KOR)	32.75	32.22
2nd place, silver medalist(s)	Tan Jingwen (CHN)	32.99	32.37
3rd place, bronze medalist(s)	Suen Ka Yi (HKG)	33.41	32.84
4	Liu Shuyuan (CHN)	33.32	33.10
5	Lei On Kei (MAC)	33.83	33.38
6	Yekaterina Sadovnik (KAZ)	33.88	33.67
7	Panward Jitpairoj (THA)	34.44	33.99
8	Phantira Saraikarn (THA)	34.06	34.14
9	Roanne Ho (SIN)	34.91	
10	Phạm Thị Huệ (VIE)	35.15	
11	Koh Ting Ting (SIN)	35.34	
12	Sally Tse (HKG)	35.37	
13	Lei Sin Ian (MAC)	35.58	
14	Ressa Kania Dewi (INA)	36.87	
15	Mirella Alam (LIB)	39.45	
16	Bibidha Rimal (NEP)	40.55	
17	Gantömöriin Oyuungerel (MGL)	40.61	
—	Razan Taha (JOR)	DNS	

==== 100 m breaststroke ====
30 October

Rank	Athlete	Heats	Final
1st place, gold medalist(s)	Lim Su-young (KOR)	1:10.70	1:09.79
2nd place, silver medalist(s)	Liu Shuyuan (CHN)	1:12.15	1:10.78
3rd place, bronze medalist(s)	Tan Jingwen (CHN)	1:12.46	1:10.80
4	Yekaterina Sadovnik (KAZ)	1:11.99	1:11.29
5	Lei On Kei (MAC)	1:13.70	1:12.92
6	Suen Ka Yi (HKG)	1:14.48	1:13.30
7	Panward Jitpairoj (THA)	1:14.12	1:14.29
8	Phantira Saraikarn (THA)	1:14.64	1:15.11
9	Sally Tse (HKG)	1:15.56	
10	Roanne Ho (SIN)	1:16.44	
11	Phạm Thị Huệ (VIE)	1:16.46	
12	Lei Sin Ian (MAC)	1:17.06	
13	Ressa Kania Dewi (INA)	1:18.05	
14	Dashtserengiin Saintsetseg (MGL)	1:19.28	
15	Mirella Alam (LIB)	1:27.82	

==== 50 m butterfly ====
1 November

Rank	Athlete	Heats	Final
1st place, gold medalist(s)	Sze Hang Yu (HKG)	27.65	27.16
2nd place, silver medalist(s)	Hannah Wilson (HKG)	27.70	27.41
3rd place, bronze medalist(s)	Park Hyun-jung (KOR)	29.00	28.15
4	Natnapa Prommuenwai (THA)	29.00	28.20
5	Guo Shiqi (CHN)	28.80	28.51
6	Ma Cheok Mei (MAC)	28.95	28.57
7	Ân Đỗ Hạnh (VIE)	29.23	29.07
8	Li Qiwen (CHN)	29.28	29.29
9	Parichat Wongpila (THA)	29.60	
10	Koh Ting Ting (SIN)	29.64	
11	Ressa Kania Dewi (INA)	29.80	
12	Nguyễn Bảo Linh (VIE)	29.97	
13	Long Chi Wun (MAC)	29.99	
14	Razan Taha (JOR)	30.11	
15	Yekaterina Belus (KAZ)	30.17	
16	Ho Shu Yong (SIN)	30.68	
17	Bianca Elinor Uy (PHI)	31.81	
18	Raina Ramdhani (INA)	32.97	
19	Heba Bashouti (JOR)	34.02	
20	Batkhuyagiin Enkhjargal (MGL)	34.17	

==== 100 m butterfly ====
31 October

Rank	Athlete	Heats	Final
1st place, gold medalist(s)	Hannah Wilson (HKG)	1:01.47	1:00.06
2nd place, silver medalist(s)	Sze Hang Yu (HKG)	1:01.30	1:00.26
3rd place, bronze medalist(s)	Natnapa Prommuenwai (THA)	1:03.17	1:02.00
4	Park Hyun-jung (KOR)	1:03.39	1:02.23
5	Ân Đỗ Hạnh (VIE)	1:04.07	1:03.16
6	Guo Shiqi (CHN)	1:03.12	1:03.23
7	Li Qiwen (CHN)	1:04.05	1:03.97
8	Ma Cheok Mei (MAC)	1:04.27	1:04.79
9	Richa Mishra (IND)	1:04.70	
10	Koh Ting Ting (SIN)	1:05.99	
11	Yekaterina Belus (KAZ)	1:06.11	
12	Ressa Kania Dewi (INA)	1:06.52	
13	Porntip Smithsarakarn (THA)	1:07.12	
14	Nguyễn Bảo Linh (VIE)	1:07.28	
15	Layla Ghul (JOR)	1:08.10	
16	Razan Taha (JOR)	1:08.89	
17	Christel Fung (SIN)	1:08.96	
18	Raina Ramdhani (INA)	1:09.25	
19	Long Chi Wun (MAC)	1:09.30	
20	Batkhuyagiin Enkhjargal (MGL)	1:16.34	

==== 100 m individual medley ====
2 November

Rank	Athlete	Heats	Final
1st place, gold medalist(s)	Sherry Tsai (HKG)	1:07.34	1:02.49
2nd place, silver medalist(s)	Sze Hang Yu (HKG)	1:06.65	1:04.02
3rd place, bronze medalist(s)	Natthanan Junkrajang (THA)	1:08.44	1:04.86
4	Lee Soo-jung (KOR)	1:07.93	1:05.00
5	Shikha Tandon (IND)	1:08.04	1:06.71
6	Liu Shuang (CHN)	1:08.80	1:07.30
7	Richa Mishra (IND)	1:08.07	1:08.02
8	Koh Ting Ting (SIN)	1:09.06	1:09.14
9	Fong Man Wai (MAC)	1:09.08	
10	Cheng Feng (CHN)	1:09.34	
11	Ressa Kania Dewi (INA)	1:09.38	
12	Phantira Saraikarn (THA)	1:09.51	
13	Yekaterina Kolyagina (KAZ)	1:10.15	
14	Tan Pei Shan (SIN)	1:10.35	
15	Nguyễn Bảo Linh (VIE)	1:10.78	
16	Choi Sin Hong (MAC)	1:11.50	
17	Razan Taha (JOR)	1:13.65	
18	Yessi Venisa Yosaputra (INA)	1:13.98	
19	Bianca Elinor Uy (PHI)	1:15.97	

==== 200 m individual medley ====
30 October

Rank	Athlete	Heats	Final
1st place, gold medalist(s)	Sherry Tsai (HKG)	2:19.39	2:13.95
2nd place, silver medalist(s)	Natthanan Junkrajang (THA)	2:20.32	2:17.82
3rd place, bronze medalist(s)	Lee Soo-jung (KOR)	2:22.56	2:17.98
4	Cheng Feng (CHN)	2:23.40	2:21.37
5	Richa Mishra (IND)	2:23.04	2:22.55
6	Ressa Kania Dewi (INA)	2:27.26	2:26.52
7	Li Qiwen (CHN)	2:26.16	2:27.04
8	Yekaterina Kolyagina (KAZ)	2:27.11	2:28.25
9	Tan Pei Shan (SIN)	2:27.74	
10	Ân Đỗ Hạnh (VIE)	2:29.16	
11	Christel Fung (SIN)	2:30.46	
12	Yessi Venisa Yosaputra (INA)	2:30.74	
13	Phantira Saraikarn (THA)	2:31.20	
14	Layla Ghul (JOR)	2:32.49	
15	Phạm Thị Huệ (VIE)	2:32.71	
16	Choi Sin Hong (MAC)	2:34.00	
17	Razan Taha (JOR)	2:39.30	
18	Maria Abou Nader (LIB)	2:55.21	

==== 4 × 50 m freestyle relay ====
1 November

Rank	Team	Heats	Final
1st place, gold medalist(s)	Hong Kong (HKG)	1:49.13	1:42.16
2nd place, silver medalist(s)	Thailand (THA)	1:49.58	1:45.18
3rd place, bronze medalist(s)	China (CHN)	1:47.19	1:46.17
4	South Korea (KOR)	1:49.32	1:48.05
5	Kazakhstan (KAZ)	1:51.23	1:48.84
6	Singapore (SIN)	1:52.76	1:51.07
7	Macau (MAC)	1:53.57	1:51.23
8	Jordan (JOR)	1:55.96	1:55.94
9	Indonesia (INA)	1:56.64	

==== 4 × 100 m freestyle relay ====
31 October

Rank	Team	Heats	Final
1st place, gold medalist(s)	Hong Kong (HKG)	3:50.08	3:43.17
2nd place, silver medalist(s)	Thailand (THA)	3:58.17	3:47.15
3rd place, bronze medalist(s)	South Korea (KOR)	4:00.14	3:53.34
4	Kazakhstan (KAZ)	4:01.85	4:00.06
5	Singapore (SIN)	4:01.73	4:01.53
6	Macau (MAC)	4:02.94	4:03.05
7	Jordan (JOR)	4:09.58	4:10.48
—	China (CHN)	3:58.04	DSQ
9	Indonesia (INA)	4:13.10	

==== 4 × 50 m medley relay ====
30 October

Rank	Team	Final
1st place, gold medalist(s)	Hong Kong (HKG)	1:53.10
2nd place, silver medalist(s)	South Korea (KOR)	1:54.52
3rd place, bronze medalist(s)	China (CHN)	1:54.89
4	Kazakhstan (KAZ)	1:58.13
5	Thailand (THA)	1:58.61
6	Macau (MAC)	2:01.21
7	Singapore (SIN)	2:04.53
8	Jordan (JOR)	2:11.58

==== 4 × 100 m medley relay ====
2 November

Rank	Team	Heats	Final
1st place, gold medalist(s)	Hong Kong (HKG)	4:32.69	4:07.84
2nd place, silver medalist(s)	South Korea (KOR)	4:19.97	4:10.74
3rd place, bronze medalist(s)	China (CHN)	4:22.65	4:12.72
4	Thailand (THA)	4:31.34	4:17.53
5	Kazakhstan (KAZ)	4:26.35	4:22.94
6	Macau (MAC)	4:35.51	4:25.41
7	Singapore (SIN)	4:44.16	4:37.04
8	Indonesia (INA)	4:42.54	4:39.53
9	Jordan (JOR)	4:59.13	
