= Artur Dilman =

Kazakhstani swimmer (born 1990)

Personal information
- Full name: Artur Valeryevich Dilman
- National team: Kazakhstan
- Born: 29 August 1990 (age 36) Alma-Ata, Kazakh SSR, Soviet Union
- Height: 1.79 m (5 ft 10 in)
- Weight: 78 kg (172 lb)

Sport
- Sport: Swimming
- Strokes: Freestyle, medley
- College team: Drury University (U.S.)
- Coach: Brian Reynolds (U.S.)
Medal record
Men's swimming
Representing Kazakhstan
Asian Games
Bronze medal – third place	2010 Guangzhou	4×100 m medley
Asian Indoor Games
Gold medal – first place	2007 Macau	4×100 m freestyle
Gold medal – first place	2009 Hanoi	4×100 m freestyle
Silver medal – second place	2007 Macau	100 m medley
Silver medal – second place	2009 Hanoi	100 m medley
Bronze medal – third place	2007 Macau	200 m medley

Artur Valeryevich Dilman (Russian: Артур Валерьевич Дильман; born 29 August 1990) is a Kazakhstani swimmer, who specialized in freestyle and individual medley events. He represented his nation Kazakhstan at the 2008 Summer Olympics, and has won a career total of six medals (two in each color) in a major international competition, spanning both the indoor and outdoor Asian Games. Dilman also spent his college sports career in the United States as a member of the Drury Panthers swimming and diving team under head coach Brian Reynolds, while pursuing his sports management studies at Drury University in Springfield, Missouri.

Dilman competed for the Kazakh swimming squad in the men's 200 m freestyle at the 2008 Summer Olympics in Beijing. Leading up to the Games, he snatched the top spot with a 1:52.42 to clear the invincible FINA B-cut (1:52.53) by 0.11 of a second at the Kazakhstan Open Championships in Almaty. Swimming in heat two, Dilman tried to hold on with Singapore's Bryan Tay and Estonia's Vladimir Sidorkin heading into the 150-metre turn for the top three spots, but faded down the final stretch to finish with a fifth-place time in 1:52.90. Dilman failed to advance into the semifinals, as he placed fifty-second overall out of fifty-eight swimmers in the prelims.

On 17 June 2012, Dilman ordered a six-month suspension by the Kazakhstan Swimming Federation, after he was tested positive for a banned substance methylhexaneamine, following an in-competition doping test at the ENKA Open in Istanbul. On 13 March 2013, Dilman helped out his college team Drury Panthers to claim their ninth consecutive title in the men's freestyle relay at the NCAA Division II Swimming Championships.
