= Oleg Rabota =

Kazakhstani swimmer (born 1990)

Personal information
- Full name: Oleg Rabota
- National team: Kazakhstan
- Born: 12 June 1990 (age 36) Alma-Ata, Kazakh SSR, Soviet Union
- Height: 1.79 m (5 ft 10 in)
- Weight: 72 kg (159 lb)

Sport
- Sport: Swimming
- Strokes: Freestyle, backstroke
- College team: Southern Illinois University (U.S.)
- Coach: Rick Walker (U.S.)
Medal record
Men's swimming
Representing Kazakhstan
Asian Indoor Games
Silver medal – second place	2007 Macau	200 m freestyle

Oleg Rabota (Kazakh: Олег Игоревич Работа; born June 12, 1990) is a Kazakh swimmer, who specialized in middle-distance freestyle and backstroke events. He represented his nation Kazakhstan at the 2008 Summer Olympics, and has won a silver medal in the 200 m freestyle at the 2007 Asian Indoor Games in Macau, China. Rabota also served as a member of the Southern Illinois Salukis swimming and diving team under head coach Rick Walker, while pursuing his sports management studies at Southern Illinois University in Carbondale, Illinois.

Rabota competed for the Kazakh squad in two swimming events at the 2008 Summer Olympics in Beijing. He posted a time of 2:03.75 to set himself up as the fourth seed headed into the 200 m backstroke final of the Olympic test event in Beijing, and then snatched the 400 m freestyle title with a 3:56.98 at the Kazakhstan Open Championships three months later in Almaty; both of these marks dipped beneath the FINA B-cut. In the 400 m freestyle, Rabota fought off with Argentina's Juan Martín Pereyra for the fourth spot throughout the race, but relegated to fifth and thirty-sixth overall to round out the opening heat in 4:02.16. Four days later, in the 200 m backstroke, Rabota raced to second on the same heat by 0.78 of a second behind leader Brett Fraser of the Cayman Islands in 2:01.95, but his thirty-third place time in the prelims would not be enough to put him through to the semifinals.
