= Alexandr Sklyar =

Kazakhstani swimmer (born 1988)

Personal information
- Full name: Alexandr Sklyar
- National team: Kazakhstan
- Born: 18 May 1988 (age 38) Pavlodar, Kazakh SSR, Soviet Union
- Height: 1.90 m (6 ft 3 in)
- Weight: 82 kg (181 lb)

Sport
- Sport: Swimming
- Strokes: Freestyle
Medal record
Men's swimming
Representing Kazakhstan
Asian Indoor Games
Gold medal – first place	2007 Macau	4×100 m freestyle
Gold medal – first place	2009 Hanoi	4×100 m freestyle
Silver medal – second place	2007 Macau	4×50 m freestyle
Silver medal – second place	2007 Macau	4×50 m medley
Bronze medal – third place	2007 Macau	100 m freestyle
Bronze medal – third place	2009 Hanoi	100 m freestyle

Aleksandr Sklyar (also Alexandr Sklyar, Kazakh: Александр Сергеевич Скляр; born May 18, 1988) is a Kazakh swimmer, who specialized in sprint freestyle events. He represented his nation Kazakhstan at the 2008 Summer Olympics, and has claimed a career total of six medals (two in each color) in a major international competition, spanning two editions of the Asian Indoor Games (2007 and 2009). Sklyar also won a silver medal, as a member of the Kazakhstan swimming team, in the 4 × 100 m freestyle relay at the 2008 Good Luck Beijing China Open.

Sklyar competed for the Kazakh swimming in the men's 100 m freestyle at the 2008 Summer Olympics in Beijing. Leading up to the Games, he rocked a lifetime best of 50.89 to slip past the FINA B-cut (50.95) by six hundredths of a second (0.06) in the final at the Russian Open Swimming Championships in Saint Petersburg. Rallying from fifth at the halfway turn in heat three, Sklyar put up a late resistant surge to quickly pass Uzbekistan's Petr Romashkin by almost half the body length for the fourth spot in 51.24. Sklyar failed to advance to the semifinals, as he placed fifty-second overall out of sixty-four swimmers in the prelims.
