= North Korea at the 2017 Asian Indoor and Martial Arts Games =

- IOC code: PRK
- NOC: Olympic Committee of the Democratic People's Republic of Korea
- Website: {{URL|example.com|optional display text}}

in Ashgabat 17–27 September
- Competitors: 1 in 1 sport
- Medals: Gold 0 Silver 0 Bronze 0 Total 0

Asian Indoor and Martial Arts Games appearances
- 2005; 2007; 2009; 2013; 2017; 2021; 2025

North Korea competed at the 2017 Asian Indoor and Martial Arts Games (as Democratic People's Republic of Korea) which was held in Ashgabat, Turkmenistan.

North Korea sent only one participant in the event who was a young Weightlifter. North Korea didn't receive any medal at the Games.

== Participants ==
Sport	Men	Women	Total
Weightlifting	1	0	1

== Weightlifting ==
North Korea participated in weightlifting.

Men

Athlete	Event	Snatch		Clean & Jerk		Total	
Athlete	Event	Result	Rank	Result	Rank	Result	Rank
Jon Ho-gyong	−62 kg	124	4	162	2	286	4
