= Bader Al-Muhana =

Saudi Arabian swimmer

Personal information
- Full name: Bader Abdulrahman Al-Muhana
- National team: Saudi Arabia
- Born: 15 November 1988 (age 37) Riyadh, Saudi Arabia
- Height: 1.83 m (6 ft 0 in)
- Weight: 72 kg (159 lb)

Sport
- Sport: Swimming
- Strokes: Butterfly
- College team: Indiana University (U.S.)

Bader Abdulrahman Al-Muhana (Arabic: بدر عبد الرحمن المهنا; born November 15, 1988) is a Saudi Arabian swimmer, who specialized in butterfly events. The only Saudi swimmer at the 2008 Summer Olympics and a graduate of King Faisal School in his hometown Riyadh, Al-Muhana swam for the Indiana Hoosiers throughout most of his college career, while pursuing international business studies at Indiana University in Bloomington, Indiana.

Al-Muhana was invited by FINA to compete for Saudi Arabia in the men's 100 m butterfly at the 2008 Summer Olympics in Beijing Swimming on the outside in heat two, Al-Muhana ended up tied for fifth place with Egypt's Ahmed Nada in a matching 55.59. Al-Muhana failed to advance to the semi-finals, as he placed sixty-first overall with Nada in the prelims.
