= Poorva Shetye =

Indian swimmer (born 1993)

Personal information
- Full name: Poorva Kiran Shetye
- Nationality: Indian
- Born: 12 March 1993 (age 33) Mumbai, India
- Height: 5 ft 0 in (152 cm)
- Weight: 58 kg (128 lb)

Sport
- Sport: Swimming
- Strokes: Breaststroke

Poorva Kiran Shetye (born 12 March 1993), is an Indian International Swimmer, who is specialized in 50 m, 100 m and 200 m breaststroke. Poorva still holds the National Record at the National Games for 50 m Breast Stroke.

Poorva was awarded Maharashtra government's most prestigious "Shiv Chhatrapati Award" in 2008 by the then Chief Minister, Prithviraj Chavan.

== Personal life ==
Poorva who was born to mother Kavita Kiran Shetye and father Kiran M Shetye in Mumbai moved to Bangalore to pursue her swimming aspiration. At a young age, she was diagnosed with chronic Bronchitis. Under advice from her family Homeopathic doctor, Dr. Seema Oak, she took swimming to improve her lung capacity. Thus at the age of six, both Poorva and her elder sister, Prachi were put into swimming.

Another reason is Poorva's father who was very inclined into sports. He himself played many sports like Table Tennis, Chess and Carrom. In the beginning, Poorva did not like swimming much but her sister loved it, she even started swimming in state level championships and became a national level diver. Her sister is the biggest inspiration to Poorva, she wanted to become like her and even she motivated her a lot to take up swimming seriously.

Poorva recently graduated with a distinction from RMIT University in Masters of Analytics located in Melbourne, Australia. She has also graduated with a distinction from CMS Business School with a Master in Business Administration Degree in the year 2016. She worked for two years as Operations Head at JGI Grassroots, a venture set up by Jain University in Bangalore. She has also received 100% scholarship during her MBA for her excellent performance in swimming.

== Swimming career ==
Poorva Shetye won one gold and silver medal in her first International participation in South Asian Swimming Championship - 2006, Islamabad. She has also participated in 29th World University Championships, Gwangju, South Korea, 15th FINA World Championship, Barcelona, Spain, XIX Commonwealth Game, Delhi, 2010. She has also participated in many national tournaments and won 40 Gold, 32 Silver and 16 Bronze Medals.

Sports Profile

- Started swimming in 1999
- Training under Pradeep Kumar
- Presented Maharashtra's sports award - Shiv Chhatrapati Krida Puraskar 2008–2009 by the 17th Chief Minister of Maharashtra, Mr. Prithviraj Chavan for achieving 3 gold, 1 silver in National Games, Ranchi 2012
- Felicitated by 11th President of India, A. P. J. Abdul Kalam

== Achievements ==
- 17 State Records
- 20 National Records
- 9th South Asian Games, Islamabad, Pakistan - 2004 (record holder)
- III Commonwealth Youth Games 2008, Pune, India
- 3rd Asian Indoor Games, Hanoi, Vietnam
- XI South Asian Games, Dhaka, Bangladesh - 2010
- XIX Commonwealth Games 2010 Delhi
- 15th FINA World Championships, Barcelona, Spain
- 29th World University Championships, Gwangju, South Korea

Participation till date:

- 30 National Meets
- 7 International Meets
- 3 National Games
