= North Korea at the 2009 Asian Indoor Games =

- IOC code: PRK
- NOC: Olympic Committee of the Democratic People's Republic of Korea

in Hanoi
- Competitors: 3 in 1 sport

Asian Indoor Games appearances
- 2005; 2007; 2009; 2013; 2017; 2021; 2025

North Korea competed at the 2009 Asian Indoor Games in Hanoi, Vietnam on 30 October – 8 November 2009. North Korea sent a delegation of 3 competitors in the sport of swimming

== Swimming ==
Athlete	Events
Sin Jin-hui	Swimming
Kang Ryong-gu	Swimming
Kim Song-hui	Swimming
