= Yuliya Litvina =

Kazakhstani swimmer

Personal information
- Born: June 4, 1993 (age 33) Almaty, Kazakhstan

Sport
- Sport: Swimming
- Strokes: Breaststroke
Medal record
Swimming
Representing Kazakhstan
Asian Youth Games
Gold medal – first place	2009 Singapore	200m breaststroke

Yuliya Litvina (born June 4, 1993) is a Kazakhstani swimmer. She was a gold medalist at the Asian Youth Games (2009), a gold medalist at the Asian Championships (2009, 2011), a semifinalist at the Youth Olympic Games (2010), the Champion of the Republic of Kazakhstan, a member of the Kazakhstan national team (2008-2012), a record holder in Kazakhstan, and an International Class Master of Sports.

== Biography ==
Yuliya Litvina was born on June 4, 1993, in Almaty.

In 2011, she graduated from a specialized boarding school for gifted children in sports in Almaty.

In March 2012, she received a doping disqualification for six months until September 25, 2012. As a result she was unable to participate in the Olympics in London.

== Competitions ==
Competitions	Year	Discipline	Place
Open Swimming Championship of Kazakhstan	2009	100m-backstroke	1
1st Asian Youth Games (Singapore)	2009	200m-backstroke	1
1st Asian Youth Games (Singapore)	2009	50m-backstroke	5
1st Asian Youth Games (Singapore)	2009	100m-backstroke	5
1st Asian Youth Games (Singapore)	2009	4x100m relay	4
3rd Asian Indoor Games (Hanoi)	2009	50m-backstroke	3
3rd Asian Indoor Games (Hanoi)	2009	100m-backstroke	2
6th Asian Age-Group Swimming Championships (Tokyo)	2009	100m-backstroke	1
6th Asian Age-Group Swimming Championships (Tokyo)	2009	50m-backstroke	2
1st Youth Olympic Games (Singapore)	2010	50m-backstroke	14
1st Youth Olympic Games (Singapore)	2010	100m-backstroke	18

=== Best Results ===
50-meter Pool:

- 50m Breaststroke - 00:32.44
- 100m Breaststroke - 01:09.72
- 200m Breaststroke - 02:35.13

25-meter Pool:

- 50m Breaststroke - 32.16
- 100m Breaststroke - 1:08.89
