= Andryein Tamir =

Mongolian swimmer (born 1986)

Personal information
- Born: April 24, 1986 (age 40)

Sport
- Sport: Swimming

Andryein Tamir (born April 24, 1986) is a Mongolian swimmer. At the 2004 Summer Olympics, he competed in the men's 100 metre freestyle, finishing in 64th place. At the 2012 Summer Olympics, he competed in the Men's 100 metre freestyle, finishing in 49th place overall in the heats, failing to qualify for the semifinals.
