= Shi Feng =

Chinese swimmer

Personal information
- Born: September 11, 1988 (age 37) Liaoyang, Liaoning

Sport
- Sport: Swimming
- Strokes: Butterfly

Shi Feng (born September 11, 1988) is a Chinese swimmer, who competed for China at the 2008 Summer Olympics in Beijing.

Shi Feng reached the semifinals of the men's 100 m butterfly. His semifinal time of 51.68 seconds meant he missed out on a place in the final by 6-hundredths of a second.

== Major achievements ==
- 2007 National Championships - 1st 100m fly;
- 2007 National Intercity Games - 1st 100m fly/back
