= Chen Cheng (swimmer) =

Chinese swimmer

Personal information
- Born: February 10, 1992 (age 34) Shanghai, China

Sport
- Sport: Swimming
- Strokes: Breaststroke

Chen Cheng (born February 10, 1992) (Chinese: 陈程) is a Chinese swimmer who placed last in the first heat of the men's 200 metre breaststroke at the 2012 Summer Olympics.

== See also ==
- China at the 2012 Summer Olympics - Swimming
