= Swimming at the 2007 World Aquatics Championships – Men's 50 metre freestyle =

Men's 50-metre freestyle at the 2007 FINA World Championships
- Venue: Rod Laver Arena
- Dates: 30 March 2007 (heats, semi-finals); 31 March 2007 (final)
- Competitors: 191 from 122 nations
- Winning time: 21.88 seconds

Medalists
gold medal	Ben; Wildman-Tobriner	United States
silver medal	Cullen Jones	United States
bronze medal	Stefan Nystrand	Sweden

The men's 50-metre freestyle event was the 28th event contested of the swimming events at the 2007 World Aquatics Championships at the Rod Laver Arena, Melbourne, Australia. The heats were held in the morning session of the meet on 30 March 2007, with the semi-finals in the evening session of the same day. The final was held on the evening of 31 March 2007.

== Records ==
Prior to the championships, the following world and World Championship records were listed by FINA.

World record
21.64	Alexander Popov (RUS)	Moscow, Russia	16 June 2000
Championship record
21.69	Roland Schoeman (RSA)	Montreal, Canada	30 July 2005

== Heats ==
Rank	Heat	Lane	Name	Nationality	Time	Notes
1	23	4	Bartosz Kizierowski	Poland	22.03	
2	23	5	Eamon Sullivan	Australia	22.06	
3	24	4	Cullen Jones	USA	22.09	
4	23	6	Stefan Nystrand	Sweden	22.12	
5	24	3	Ben Wildman-Tobriner	USA	22.20	
6	22	2	César Cielo Filho	Brazil	22.25	
7	23	2	Alain Bernard	France	22.26	
8	24	5	Frédérick Bousquet	France	22.33	
8	24	2	Eduard Lorente Ginesta	Spain	22.33	
10	22	5	Roland Schoeman	South Africa	22.34	
11	24	1	Jernej Godec	Slovenia	22.39	
12	23	7	Petter Stymne	Sweden	22.46	
13	24	6	Brent Hayden	Canada	22.50	
14	23	3	Ashley Callus	Australia	22.55	
15	21	8	Gerhard Zandberg	South Africa	22.60	
16	22	3	Salim Iles	Algeria	22.63	
17	24	8	George Bovell	Trinidad and Tobago	22.64	
18	23	8	Makoto Ito	Japan	22.66	
19	21	5	Simon Burnett	Great Britain	22.69	
20	21	2	Matti Rajakylä	Finland	22.73	
21	21	4	Andrey Grechin	Russia	22.76	
22	22	8	Apostolos Tsagkarakis	Greece	22.77	
23	24	7	Rafed-Zyad Almasri	Syria	22.82	
24	22	6	Yevgeny Lagunov	Russia	22.83	
24	23	1	Matthew Rose	Canada	22.83	
26	18	6	Bruno Barbic	Croatia	22.86	
27	22	1	Cai Li	China	22.98	
28	22	7	Rolandas Gimbutis	Lithuania	23.00	
29	21	7	Jakob Andkjær	Denmark	23.01	
30	18	3	Octavian Guţu	Romania	23.06	
31	18	5	Jacinto Ayala	Dominican Republic	23.09	
32	21	6	Yoris Grandjean	Belgium	23.10	
33	19	3	Stanislau Neviarouski	Belarus	23.13	
34	20	6	Lorenzo Vismara	Italy	23.16	
35	19	1	Octavio Alesi	Venezuela	23.18	
36	17	2	Camilo Becerra	Colombia	23.25	
37	17	3	Cameron Gibson	New Zealand	23.30	
37	21	1	Norbert Trandafir	Romania	23.30	
39	19	7	Mark Herring	New Zealand	23.32	
40	18	1	Mario Todorović	Croatia	23.33	
40	20	1	Paul Kutscher	Uruguay	23.33	
42	15	8	David Dunford	Kenya	23.35	
43	19	6	Jere Hård	Finland	23.36	
44	20	2	Yuriy Yegoshin	Ukraine	23.37	
44	20	7	Karel Novy	Switzerland	23.37	
46	17	4	Alessandro Gaffuri	Switzerland	23.43	
46	19	2	Nicolas Oliveira	Brazil	23.43	
48	20	8	Michael Schubert	Germany	23.44	
49	17	1	Robin Dale Oen	Norway	23.50	
49	20	3	Gabriel Melconian	Uruguay	23.50	
51	18	2	Josh Laban	(United States Virgin Islands) Virgin Islands	23.64	
52	17	8	Alexandr Sklyar	Kazakhstan	23.69	
53	20	4	Shi Yang	China	23.73	
54	18	4	Vitaly Khan	Kazakhstan	23.74	
55	16	4	Hiroaki Yamamoto	Japan	23.76	
55	19	8	Ravil Nachaev	Uzbekistan	23.76	
57	17	6	Terrence Haynes	Barbados	23.80	
58	17	7	Carl Probert	Fiji	23.84	
59	19	5	Alexandre Bakhtiarov	Cyprus	23.85	
60	18	7	Giedrius Titenis	Lithuania	23.97	
61	19	4	Roy-Allan Burch	Bermuda	23.98	
62	16	1	Martyn Forde	Barbados	23.99	
63	14	6	Lim Nam-Gyun	Korea	24.01	
64	18	8	Shai Liwnat	Israel	24.03	
65	20	5	Arwut Chinnapasaen	Thailand	24.05	
66	15	4	Virdhawal Khade	India	24.06	
67	16	5	Crox Acuña	Venezuela	24.12	
68	15	6	Jan Roodzant	Aruba	24.18	
69	17	5	Vasilii Danilov	Kyrgyzstan	24.22	
70	16	3	Basil Kaaki	Lebanon	24.31	
71	16	6	Mohammad Bidaryan	Iran	24.38	
72	15	3	Quee Lim Ernest Teo	Singapore	24.48	
73	15	2	Russell Ong	Singapore	24.49	
74	16	7	Varun Divgikar	India	24.53	
75	14	3	Rama Vyombo	Kenya	24.55	
76	15	1	Yellow Yeiyah	Nigeria	24.62	
77	14	1	Kristian Olsen	Faroe Islands	24.65	
78	16	2	Mikael Koloyan	Armenia	24.67	
79	12	1	Charles Ridaura Carbonell	Andorra	24.68	
80	14	8	Kieran Locke	(United States Virgin Islands) Virgin Islands	24.69	
81	13	5	Harutyun Harutyunyan	Armenia	24.71	
82	10	6	Youssef Hafdi	Morocco	24.73	
83	15	7	Dmitriy Loginov	Uzbekistan	24.79	
84	15	5	Wei Wen Wang	Chinese Taipei	24.82	
85	14	4	Nikola Ustadvich	Peru	24.85	
86	11	5	Luke Hall	Swaziland	24.88	
87	13	7	Rodion Davelaar	Netherlands Antilles	24.93	
88	14	7	Manuel Alonso Yabar-Davila	Peru	24.95	
89	12	7	Daniel Lee	Sri Lanka	24.99	
90	14	5	Brian Howard Ho	Indonesia	25.01	
91	11	8	Amine Kouam	Morocco	25.08	
92	11	4	Marcelo Alba	Bolivia	25.11	
93	12	4	Anas Hamadeh	Jordan	25.13	
94	13	3	Obaid Al-Jasmi	United Arab Emirates	25.20	
95	11	3	Gael Adam	Mauritius	25.24	
96	13	8	Christopher Duenas	Guam	25.29	
97	10	7	Rainui Terupaia	Tahiti	25.38	
97	12	2	Daryl Harford	Grenada	25.38	
99	13	1	Jose Enmanuel Lobo Martinez	Paraguay	25.39	
99	14	2	Srdjan Vujasin	Bosnia and Herzegovina	25.39	
101	13	6	Yassir Abalalla	Bolivia	25.44	
102	9	4	Yannick Roberts	Guyana	25.46	
103	13	2	Goran Stamenov	Macedonia	25.55	
104	9	6	Jonathan Calderon	Saint Lucia	25.61	
105	12	5	Marc Pascal Pierre Dansou	Benin	25.70	
106	8	5	Alois Dansou	Benin	25.79	
106	9	7	Andrey Molchanov	Turkmenistan	25.79	
106	12	6	Otiko Kpliboh	Nigeria	25.79	
109	9	3	Eric Chang	Malaysia	25.88	
110	10	1	Wui Chon Cheong	Macao	25.89	
111	10	4	Leonel Matonse	Mozambique	25.97	
112	12	8	Julio Cesar Rivera Coello	Honduras	25.98	
113	10	2	Heshan Unamboowe	Sri Lanka	25.99	
114	12	3	Naji Askia Ferguson	Grenada	26.01	
115	7	3	Pál Joensen	Faroe Islands	26.03	
115	8	4	Kin Wa Cheong	Macao	26.03	
117	11	7	Heimanu Sichan	Tahiti	26.05	
118	8	3	Loai Tashkandi	Saudi Arabia	26.15	
119	9	8	Adil Baig	Pakistan	26.16	
119	10	8	Carlos Shimizu	Guam	26.16	
121	8	8	Zane Jordan	Zambia	26.23	
122	11	6	Genaro Mathias Prono Britez	Paraguay	26.24	
123	8	2	Jean-Luc Augier	Saint Lucia	26.25	
124	8	6	Joshua Marfleet	American Samoa	26.29	
125	10	3	Tamir Andrei	Mongolia	26.34	
126	6	4	Niall Roberts	Guyana	26.39	
127	8	7	Hazem Tashkandi	Saudi Arabia	26.49	
128	11	1	Monder Al-Jabali	Libya	26.62	
129	7	5	Marbi Hani	Albania	26.67	
130	1	6	Raukura Waiti	Cook Islands	26.75	
131	6	3	Mduduzi Xaba	Swaziland	26.78	
132	6	5	Ibrahim Maliki Amadou	Niger	26.95	
133	7	7	Kyaw Zin	Myanmar	27.01	
134	7	4	Fadi Awesat	Palestinian Territory	27.06	
135	9	2	Tural Abbasov	Azerbaijan	27.21	
136	6	2	Batchuluun Mendbayar	Mongolia	27.31	
136	7	6	Eli Ebenezer Wong	Northern Mariana Islands	27.31	
138	11	2	Timur Kartabaev	Kyrgyzstan	27.44	
139	4	4	Justine Rodriguez	Federated States of Micronesia	27.45	
140	7	2	Nareth Sovan	Cambodia	27.55	
141	7	8	Sami Nassar	Palestinian Territory	27.58	
142	6	1	Sergey Krovyakov	Turkmenistan	27.67	
143	6	6	Stephenson Wallace	Saint Vincent and the Grenadines	27.71	
144	5	5	Michael Taylor	Marshall Islands	27.83	
145	5	2	Tony Augustine	Federated States of Micronesia	27.85	
146	5	8	Prasiddha Jung Shah	Nepal	27.94	
147	4	7	Isao Misech	Palau	28.29	
148	2	8	Muwanguzi Muzafuru	Uganda	28.30	
149	1	7	Khaykeo Viengmany	Laos	28.51	
150	5	1	Justin Decoster	Marshall Islands	28.55	
151	4	5	Hassan Ashraf	Maldives	28.63	
152	6	7	Kevin Cheung	Mauritius	28.80	
153	5	7	Ching Maou Wei	American Samoa	29.08	
154	2	1	Attoumani Mohamed	Comoros	29.10	
155	4	2	Dante Williams	Antigua and Barbuda	29.42	
156	9	1	Khalid Rushaka	Tanzania	29.44	
157	1	3	Petero Okotai	Cook Islands	29.54	
158	3	5	Rahim Karmali	Uganda	29.59	
159	5	4	Rajib Chitrakar	Nepal	29.68	
160	3	4	Aimable Habimana	Rwanda	29.88	
161	4	1	Ibrahim Areesh	Maldives	30.14	
162	2	5	Okai Opanka Adu	Ghana	30.27	
163	6	8	Abdulsalam Al Gadabi	Yemen	31.25	
164	5	3	Aymard Lumuamu−Dimbu	Republic of the Congo	31.57	
165	1	1	Thepphithak Chindavong	Laos	31.67	
166	3	3	Cooper Theodore Graf	Northern Mariana Islands	31.78	
167	2	3	Bernard Blewudzi	Ghana	32.11	
168	2	2	Boipelo Makhothi	Lesotho	32.29	
169	3	6	Vincent Leatualevao Jr.	American Samoa	32.37	
170	5	6	Abubakarr Jalloh	Sierra Leone	32.41	
171	4	3	Iglay Dangassat−Sissoulou	Republic of the Congo	33.15	
172	1	2	Rene Jacob Yougbare	Burkina Faso	33.91	
173	2	6	Salfo Ilbouda	Burkina Faso	34.42	
174	8	1	Gibrilla Bamba	Sierra Leone	38.00	
175	3	2	Lehlohonolo Moromella	Lesotho	38.06	
–	2	4	Amrane Abderemane	Comoros	DNS	
–	2	7	Milorad Čavić	Serbia	DNS	
–	3	1	Modou Gaye	Mauritania	DNS	
–	3	7	Alisher Chingizov	Tajikistan	DNS	
–	3	8	Mohamed Ahmed Lebyadh	Mauritania	DNS	
–	4	6	Mohamed Karsani	Sudan	DNS	
–	4	8	Akibou Yacouba Ali Maiga	Niger	DNS	
–	7	1	Essossimana Awizoba	Togo	DNS	
–	9	5	Joao Matias	Angola	DNS	
–	13	4	Joao Aguiar	Angola	DNS	
–	16	8	Samson Makere	Tanzania	DNS	
–	21	3	Pieter van den Hoogenband	Netherlands	DNS	
–	22	4	Oleksandr Volynets	Ukraine	DNS	
–	1	4	Jackson Niyomugabo	Rwanda	DSQ	
–	1	5	Herve Nkurrnziza	Burundi	DSQ	
–	10	5	Chakyl Camal	Mozambique	DSQ	

== Semi-finals ==
Rank	Heat	Lane	Name	Nationality	Time	Notes
1	1	5	Stefan Nystrand	Sweden	21.99	
2	2	5	Cullen Jones	United States	22.00	
3	1	3	César Cielo Filho	Brazil	22.09	SA
4	2	4	Bartosz Kizierowski	Poland	22.13	
5	1	4	Eamon Sullivan	Australia	22.19	
6	2	3	Ben Wildman-Tobriner	United States	22.23	
7	1	2	Roland Schoeman	South Africa	22.24	
8	2	1	Brent Hayden	Canada	22.31	
9	2	2	Eduardo Lorente	Spain	22.40	
9	2	6	Alain Bernard	France	22.40	
11	2	8	Gerhard Zandberg	South Africa	22.44	
12	1	6	Frédérick Bousquet	France	22.50	
13	1	8	Salim Iles	Algeria	22.56	
14	2	7	Jernej Godec	Slovenia	22.59	
15	1	1	Ashley Callus	Australia	22.63	
16	1	7	Petter Stymne	Sweden	22.64	

== Final ==
Rank	Lane	Name	Nationality	Time	Notes
1st place, gold medalist(s)	7	Ben Wildman-Tobriner	United States	21.88	
2nd place, silver medalist(s)	5	Cullen Jones	United States	21.94	
3rd place, bronze medalist(s)	4	Stefan Nystrand	Sweden	21.97	
4	6	Bartosz Kizierowski	Poland	22.00	
5	2	Eamon Sullivan	Australia	22.05	
6	3	César Cielo Filho	Brazil	22.12	
7	1	Roland Schoeman	South Africa	22.16	
8	8	Brent Hayden	Canada	22.28	
