= Swimming at the 2007 World Aquatics Championships – Men's 100 metre freestyle =

Men's 100 metre freestyle at the 2007 FINA World Championships
- Venue: Rod Laver Arena
- Dates: 28 March 2007 (heats, semifinals); 29 March 2007 (final)
- Competitors: 176
- Winning time: 48.43 seconds

Medalists
gold medal	Brent Hayden	Canada
gold medal	Filippo Magnini	Italy
bronze medal	Eamon Sullivan	Australia

The Men's 100 metres Freestyle event was the 19th event contested on the 2007 World Aquatics Championship for Swimming.

The 22 heats began at 10:21, on 28 March 2007, at the Rod Laver Arena, in Melbourne Park.

The semifinals started on the evening of the same day at 19:00.

The final started at 19:42 on the following day, 29 March.

== Records ==
World record	47.84	Pieter van den Hoogenband (NED)	Sydney, Australia	19 September 2000
Championship record	48.12	Filippo Magnini (ITA)	Montreal, Canada	28 July 2005

== Results ==
=== Heats ===
Rank	Heat	Lane	Name	Nationality	50m	Time	Q
1	21	5	Jason Lezak	USA	23.22	49.02	Q
2	22	3	Filippo Magnini	Italy	24.07	49.05	Q
3	21	3	Pieter van den Hoogenband	Netherlands	23.74	49.06	Q
4	22	7	Alain Bernard	France	23.12	49.08	Q
5	20	4	Brent Hayden	Canada	23.78	49.13	Q
5	21	4	Simon Burnett	Great Britain	23.57	49.13	Q
7	22	6	Eamon Sullivan	Australia	23.30	49.20	Q
8	20	1	Ryk Neethling	South Africa	23.52	49.24	Q
9	22	5	César Cielo	Brazil	23.73	49.28	Q
10	20	5	Stefan Nystrand	Sweden	24.09	49.31	Q
11	22	8	Albert Subirats Altes	Venezuela	23.56	49.34	Q
12	18	4	Dominik Meichtry	Switzerland	23.49	49.43	Q
12	21	7	Ashley Callus	Australia	23.57	49.43	Q
14	19	4	Mitja Zastrow	Netherlands	23.99	49.45	Q
15	22	4	Roland Schoeman	South Africa	23.32	49.46	Q
16	21	2	Christian Galenda	Italy	23.94	49.48	Q
17	22	2	Yevgeny Lagunov	Russia	24.14	49.65	
18	17	2	Ross Davenport	Great Britain	24.23	49.69	
19	17	1	Tiago Venâncio	Portugal	23.73	49.71	
20	21	8	Yuriy Yegoshin	Ukraine	23.71	49.72	
21	20	7	Andrey Kapralov	Russia	24.05	49.76	
22	20	2	Neil Walker	USA	23.38	49.83	
23	18	1	Daisuke Hosokawa	Japan	24.11	49.86	
24	19	3	Jakob Andkjær	Denmark	24.28	49.87	
25	16	3	Cameron Gibson	New Zealand	24.05	49.88	
26	19	6	Nicolas Oliveira	Brazil	24.18	49.91	
27	20	3	Frédérick Bousquet	France	23.25	49.94	
28	15	4	Jason Dunford	Kenya	23.61	49.98	
28	16	6	Paulius Viktoravičius	Lithuania	24.02	49.98	
28	20	6	CHEN Zuo	China	24.38	49.98	
31	18	5	Karel Novy	Switzerland	24.02	50.02	
32	19	8	Nabil Kebbab	Algeria	24.09	50.04	
33	19	1	Stanislau Neviarouski	Belarus	24.27	50.10	
34	20	8	Jens Schreiber	Germany	23.75	50.11	
35	22	1	Rolandas Gimbutis	Lithuania	24.00	50.15	
36	17	4	Yoris Grandjean	Belgium	24.22	50.18	
37	17	5	Peter Mankoč	Slovenia	24.02	50.22	
38	21	6	Salim Iles	Algeria	23.51	50.24	
39	21	1	Rick Say	Canada	24.27	50.25	
40	18	3	Huang Shaohua	China	24.37	50.31	
41	17	8	Dominik Koll	Austria	23.93	50.38	
41	19	2	Matti Rajakylä	Finland	24.15	50.38	
43	18	6	Takamitsu Kojima	Japan	24.40	50.39	
44	19	7	Martin Verner	Czech Republic	23.76	50.47	
45	14	5	Apostolos Tsagkarakis	Greece	24.13	50.53	
46	18	7	Oleksandr Tsepukh	Ukraine	24.08	50.54	
47	18	2	George Bovell	Trinidad and Tobago	23.81	50.55	
48	19	5	Michael Schubert	Germany	24.64	50.56	
49	16	7	Örn Arnarson	Iceland	24.21	50.60	
50	17	6	Octavian Guțu	Romania	23.95	50.64	
51	17	7	Marcus Piehl	Sweden	23.69	50.66	
52	16	4	Ryan Pini	Papua New Guinea	24.20	50.72	
53	15	1	Mario Delač	Croatia	24.21	50.75	
54	16	1	Norbert Trandafir	Romania	24.50	50.76	
55	16	2	Shai Livnat	Israel	24.75	50.79	
56	16	8	Romāns Miloslavskis	Latvia	24.63	50.86	
57	16	5	Octavio Alesi	Venezuela	24.36	50.88	
58	15	6	Mark Herring	New Zealand	24.04	50.92	
59	15	3	Martin Kutscher Belgeri	Uruguay	24.54	51.03	
60	15	2	Vitaliy Khan	Kazakhstan	24.66	51.17	
61	13	6	Virdhawal Khade	India	24.98	51.46	
62	12	4	Igor Čerenšek	Croatia	24.25	51.47	
62	15	5	Gabriel Melconian	Uruguay	24.41	51.47	
64	14	6	Namgyun Lim	South Korea	24.94	51.64	
65	14	1	Jacinto Ayala	Dominican Republic	24.45	51.73	
66	15	8	Zhirong Bryan Tay	Singapore	25.38	51.75	
67	13	4	Maximiliano Schnettler	Chile	25.02	51.84	
68	13	2	David Dunford	Kenya	24.67	51.85	
69	14	4	Glenn Surgeloose	Belgium	24.79	51.95	
70	15	7	Alexandr Sklyar	Kazakhstan	24.89	51.97	
71	12	3	Terrence Haynes	Barbados	24.74	52.07	
72	14	3	Alexandre Bakhtiarov	Cyprus	24.69	52.09	
73	13	8	Mohammad Bidarian	Iran	24.96	52.11	
74	13	1	Josh Laban	(United States Virgin Islands) Virgin Islands	24.79	52.34	
75	14	2	Camilo Becerra	Colombia	24.54	52.38	
76	1	3	Roy-Allan Saul Burch Burch	Bermuda	24.62	52.40	
77	14	8	Daniel Bego	Malaysia	25.29	52.45	
78	12	8	Ankur Poseria	India	25.10	52.59	
79	14	7	Carl Probert	Fiji	24.81	52.69	
80	12	7	Mario Montoya	Costa Rica	25.31	52.85	
81	12	2	Martyn Forde	Barbados	25.27	52.90	
82	12	5	Russell Ong	Singapore	25.20	53.00	
83	11	8	Mikael Koloyan	Armenia	25.18	53.01	
84	11	3	Jan Roodzant	Aruba	25.16	53.13	
85	11	4	Petr Romashkin	Uzbekistan	25.46	53.48	
86	13	5	Basil Kaaki	Lebanon	25.39	53.50	
87	11	7	Nikola Ustadvich	Peru	26.07	53.51	
88	11	6	Wing Cheung Victor Wong	Macau	25.84	53.64	
89	12	6	Sergey Tsoy	Uzbekistan	25.72	53.70	
90	18	8	Suriya Suksuphak	Thailand	25.60	53.85	
91	12	1	Giancarlo Zolezzi Seoane	Chile	25.94	53.86	
92	13	7	Rony Bakale	Congo	25.66	53.87	
93	10	4	Andy Wibowo	Indonesia	26.30	53.91	
94	9	4	Christopher Duenas	Guam	26.37	54.10	
95	11	5	Jose Enmanuel Lobo Martinez	Paraguay	25.83	54.20	
96	1	6	Itai Chammah	Israel	25.50	54.30	
97	9	3	Srdjan Vujasin	Bosnia and Herzegovina	25.83	54.34	
98	10	6	Brian Howard Ho	Indonesia	26.53	54.36	
99	10	3	Kieran Locke	(United States Virgin Islands) Virgin Islands	25.72	54.37	
100	10	7	Anas Hamadeh	Jordan	25.76	54.42	
101	8	7	Kristian Olsen	Faroe Islands	26.32	54.43	
102	9	2	Rodion Davelaar	Netherlands Antilles	26.05	54.48	
103	9	6	Marcelo Alba	Bolivia	26.00	54.56	
104	10	8	Carles Ridaura Carbonell	Andorra	26.10	54.65	
105	9	5	Marc Pascal Pierre Dansou	Benin	26.51	54.68	
106	8	8	Daniel Lee	Sri Lanka	26.25	54.78	
107	11	1	Obaid Al Jasmi	United Arab Emirates	26.29	54.82	
108	8	6	Khaly Ciss	Senegal	26.56	54.84	
109	9	1	Harutyun Harutyunyan	Armenia	25.07	54.93	
110	8	5	Gael Adam	Mauritius	26.52	54.97	
111	11	2	Goksu Bicer	Turkey	26.18	55.04	
112	6	5	Pál Joensen	Faroe Islands	26.16	55.07	
113	10	5	Oscar Jahnsen	Peru	26.57	55.15	
114	10	2	Goran Stamenov	Macedonia	25.49	55.31	
115	9	7	Heshan Unamboowe	Sri Lanka	26.61	55.32	
116	7	4	Yellow Yeiyah	Nigeria	25.67	55.38	
116	7	1	Alois Patrice Kouadjo Dansou	Benin	26.34	55.38	
118	8	1	Luke Hall	Eswatini	26.54	55.63	
119	8	3	Leonel ds Santos Matonse	Mozambique	26.60	55.67	
120	7	7	Loai Tashkandi	Saudi Arabia	27.40	55.68	
121	8	2	Miguel Navarro	Bolivia	27.01	55.70	
122	6	1	Julio Cesar Rivera Coello	Honduras	27.12	55.90	
123	7	5	Juan Francisco Lagos Diaz	Honduras	27.20	56.05	
124	7	3	Heimanu Sichan	Tahiti	26.87	56.08	
125	5	7	Andrey Molchanov	Turkmenistan	26.62	56.13	
126	6	7	Chakyl Camal	Mozambique	27.53	56.19	
127	4	4	Rainui Terupaia	Tahiti	27.53	56.21	
128	9	8	Nuno Rola	Angola	27.20	56.31	
129	7	6	Otiko Kpliboh	Nigeria	26.79	56.35	
130	1	2	Eric Chang	Malaysia	26.66	56.43	
131	5	1	Yannick Roberts	Guyana	26.74	56.47	
131	6	6	Adil Baig	Pakistan	27.35	56.47	
133	5	3	Zane Jordan	Zambia	26.89	56.57	
134	6	4	Tamir Andrei	Mongolia	27.09	56.76	
135	4	5	Carlos Shimizu	Guam	27.16	57.01	
136	6	3	Omar Núñez	Nicaragua	27.36	57.02	
137	3	3	Joshua Marfleet	Samoa	27.11	57.11	
138	10	1	Rashid Iunusov	Kyrgyzstan	27.22	57.35	
139	6	2	Richard Randrianandraina	Madagascar	26.98	57.45	
140	5	6	Wui Chon Cheong	Macau	27.53	57.50	
141	4	2	Oliver Quick	Gibraltar	27.85	57.75	
142	4	6	Jean−Luc Augier	Saint Lucia	28.48	57.79	
143	7	8	Genaro Mathias Prono Britez	Paraguay	27.07	57.85	
144	5	8	Kyaw Zin	Myanmar	27.87	57.99	
145	4	3	Eli Ebenezerq Wong	Northern Mariana Islands	28.25	58.13	
145	6	8	Eros Qama	Albania	27.61	58.13	
147	5	2	Malbor Oshafi	Albania	27.79	58.22	
148	3	6	Hamza Abdo	Palestine	27.34	58.65	
149	4	7	Fadi Awesat	Palestine	27.62	58.82	
150	7	2	Aleksey Klimenko	Kyrgyzstan	27.99	59.36	
151	3	4	Sergey Krovyakov	Turkmenistan	28.26	59.78	
152	3	5	Batchuluun Mendbayar	Mongolia	27.56	59.80	
153	4	8	Niall Roberts	Guyana	28.61	1:00.05	
154	3	2	Michael Taylor	Marshall Islands	29.12	1:01.08	
155	2	4	Justin Decoster	Marshall Islands	30.38	1:03.84	
156	3	8	Isao Misech	Palau	29.77	1:05.08	
157	2	5	Rahim Karmali	Uganda	31.11	1:05.11	
158	3	1	Mohamed Sharif	Maldives	30.72	1:05.15	
159	2	6	Cooper Theodore Graf	Northern Mariana Islands	31.72	1:05.75	
160	2	3	Ibrahim Areesh	Maldives	31.79	1:06.61	
161	5	4	Khalid Rushaka	Tanzania	30.74	1:06.92	
162	2	2	Ching Maou Wei	American Samoa	30.47	1:07.36	
163	5	5	Jamal Talib	Tanzania	31.02	1:07.68	
164	3	7	Abdulsalam Al Gadabi	Yemen	31.63	1:08.78	
165	1	8	Herve Nkurrnziza	Burundi	31.92	1:08.91	
166	1	1	Attoumani Mohamed	Comoros	29.57	1:12.49	
167	2	1	Vincent Leatualevao	American Samoa	34.39	1:16.87	
168	1	4	Boipelo Makhothi	Lesotho	34.57	1:17.17	NR
169	1	7	Thabiso Baholo	Lesotho	36.76	1:22.04	
	1	5	Bernard Blewudzi	Ghana	DNS		
	2	7	Alisher Chingizov	Tajikistan	DNS		
	2	8	Ibraihm Assah	Ghana	DNS		
	4	1	Essossimana Awizoba	Togo	DNS		
	8	4	Joao Aguiar	Angola	DNS		
	13	3	Rafed-Zyad Almasri	Syria	DNS		
	17	3	Aristeidis Grigoriadis	Greece	DNS		

=== Semifinals ===
Rank	Heat	Lane	Name	Nationality	50m	Time	Notes
1	2	4	Jason Lezak	United States	23.09	48.51	
2	1	4	Filippo Magnini	Italy	23.50	48.60	
3	2	5	Pieter van den Hoogenband	Netherlands	23.55	48.72	
4	2	3	Brent Hayden	Canada	23.31	48.79	
5	2	6	Eamon Sullivan	Australia	23.02	48.86	
6	1	6	Ryk Neethling	South Africa	23.14	48.87	
6	2	2	César Cielo Filho	Brazil	23.42	48.87	
6	2	8	Roland Schoeman	South Africa	22.90	48.87	
9	1	5	Alain Bernard	France	23.27	48.89	
10	1	2	Stefan Nystrand	Sweden	23.68	48.92	
11	2	7	Albert Subirats Altes	Venezuela	23.54	49.17	
12	1	3	Simon Burnett	Great Britain	23.55	49.22	
13	1	7	Dominik Meichtry	Switzerland	23.52	49.27	
14	1	8	Christian Galenda	Italy	23.64	49.31	
15	1	1	Mitja Zastrow	Netherlands	23.98	49.41	
16	2	1	Ashley Callus	Australia	23.36	49.45	

=== Final ===
Rank	Lane	Name	Nationality	50m	Time	Notes
1st place, gold medalist(s)	5	Filippo Magnini	Italy	23.24	48.43	
1st place, gold medalist(s)	6	Brent Hayden	Canada	23.07	48.43	
3rd place, bronze medalist(s)	2	Eamon Sullivan	Australia	22.92	48.47	
4	1	César Cielo Filho	Brazil	22.83	48.51	SA
5	4	Jason Lezak	United States	23.03	48.52	
6	3	Pieter van den Hoogenband	Netherlands	23.51	48.63	
7	8	Roland Schoeman	South Africa	22.87	48.72	
8	7	Ryk Neethling	South Africa	23.02	48.81	
