= Swimming at the 2006 Asian Games – Men's 200 metre individual medley =

Men's 200 metre individual medley at the 2006 Asian Games
- Venue: Hamad Aquatic Centre
- Date: 6 December 2006
- Competitors: 23 from 17 nations

Medalists
gold medal	Hidemasa Sano	Japan
silver medal	Ken Takakuwa	Japan
bronze medal	Han Kyu-chul	South Korea

The men's 200m individual medley swimming event at the 2006 Asian Games was held on December 6, 2006 at the Hamad Aquatic Centre in Doha, Qatar.

== Schedule ==
All times are Arabia Standard Time (UTC+03:00)

Date	Time	Event
Wednesday, 6 December 2006	10:43	Heats
Wednesday, 6 December 2006	18:38	Final

== Records ==
Prior to this competition, the existing world, Asian and Games records were as follows.

World Record	Michael Phelps (USA)	1:55.84	Victoria, Canada	20 August 2006
Asian Record	Ken Takakuwa (JPN)	1:59.81	Victoria, Canada	20 August 2006
Games Record	Takahiro Mori (JPN)	2:00.53	Busan, South Korea	30 September 2002

== Results ==
Legend

- DNS — Did not start

=== Heats ===
Rank	Heat	Athlete	Time	Notes
1	1	Hidemasa Sano (JPN)	2:04.62	
2	3	Ken Takakuwa (JPN)	2:05.29	
3	2	Dmitriy Gordiyenko (KAZ)	2:05.89	
4	3	Han Kyu-chul (KOR)	2:06.37	
5	2	Qu Jingyu (CHN)	2:07.98	
6	3	Miguel Molina (PHI)	2:08.18	
7	3	Vasilii Danilov (KGZ)	2:08.66	
8	1	Park Beom-ho (KOR)	2:08.84	
9	2	Lim Zhi Cong (SIN)	2:09.09	
10	1	Iurii Zakharov (KGZ)	2:10.06	
11	2	Tsai Kuo-chuan (TPE)	2:10.56	
12	1	Hsu Chi-chieh (TPE)	2:10.66	
13	2	Kevin Chu (HKG)	2:11.44	
14	1	Victor Wong (MAC)	2:12.73	
15	2	Cheung Siu Hang (HKG)	2:12.89	
16	3	Oleg Pukhnatiy (UZB)	2:13.05	
17	2	Rehan Poncha (IND)	2:13.14	
18	3	Shahin Baradaran (IRI)	2:14.15	
19	1	Marzouq Al-Salem (KUW)	2:15.56	
20	1	Lei Hong Nam (MAC)	2:18.75	
21	3	Ali Mohamed Raaidh (MDV)	2:53.48	
22	2	Amir Adnan (IRQ)	2:55.32	
—	3	Yousuf Al-Yousuf (KSA)	DNS	

=== Final ===
Rank	Athlete	Time	Notes
1st place, gold medalist(s)	Hidemasa Sano (JPN)	2:00.73	
2nd place, silver medalist(s)	Ken Takakuwa (JPN)	2:01.03	
3rd place, bronze medalist(s)	Han Kyu-chul (KOR)	2:02.56	
4	Qu Jingyu (CHN)	2:03.80	
5	Miguel Molina (PHI)	2:05.18	
6	Park Beom-ho (KOR)	2:05.28	
7	Dmitriy Gordiyenko (KAZ)	2:05.89	
8	Vasilii Danilov (KGZ)	2:09.19	
