= Maldives at the 2008 Summer Olympics =

- Flag of the Maldives
- IOC code: MDV
- NOC: Maldives Olympic Committee
- Website: www.olympic.mv

in Beijing, China 8 August 2008 – 24 August 2008
- Competitors: 4 in 2 sports
- Flag bearer (opening): Aminath Rouya Hussain
- Flag bearer (closing): Ali Shareef
- Medals: Gold 0 Silver 0 Bronze 0 Total 0

Summer Olympics appearances (overview)
- 1988; 1992; 1996; 2000; 2004; 2008; 2012; 2016; 2020; 2024; 2028

The Maldives competed in the 2008 Summer Olympics, which were held in Beijing, China from August 8 to August 24, 2008. The country's participation at the Beijing Olympics marked its seventh appearance in the Summer Olympics since its debut at the 1988 Summer Olympics. The delegation included four athletes, two in athletics (Ali Shareef and Aishath Reesha), and two in swimming (Ibrahim Shameel and Aminath Rouya Hussain) who participated in four distinct events. Its four athletes did not advance past the first round in each of their events. Aminath Rouya Hussain carried the Maldivian flag during the parade of nations of the opening ceremony with sprinter Ali Shareef being the flagbearer for the closing ceremony. The country failed to win an Olympic medal at these Games and has yet to win their first medal.

== Background ==
The Maldives is an archipelagic country located in Southern Asia, situated in the Indian Ocean. Formerly a protectorate of the United Kingdom, it gained independence in 1965. The Maldives Olympic Committee was formed in 1985, and was recognized by the International Olympic Committee the same year. The Maldives have participated in every Summer Olympics since its debut in the 1988 Summer Olympics in Seoul. The highest number of Maldivians participating at any single Summer Games was seven at the 1988 Games and the 1992 Games in Barcelona, Spain. No Maldivian has ever won a medal at the Olympics.

The 2008 Summer Olympics were held from 8 to 24 August 2008. For the 2008 Summer Olympics, the Maldives sent a delegation of four athletes. The Maldivian team at the 2008 Games featured two track and field athletes and two swimmers. Sprinters Ali Shareef and Aishath Reesha were chosen to compete in the men's 100 metres and women's 800 metres respectively. Swimmers Ibrahim Shameel and Aminath Rouya Hussain participated in the men's 50 metre freestyle and women's 50 metre freestyle respectively. Aminath Rouya Hussain was the only returning athlete from the 2004 Summer Olympics in Athens, Greece. She was also the flagbearer for the Maldives during the parade of nations of the opening ceremony with sprinter Ali Shareef being the flagbearer for the closing ceremony.

== Athletics ==
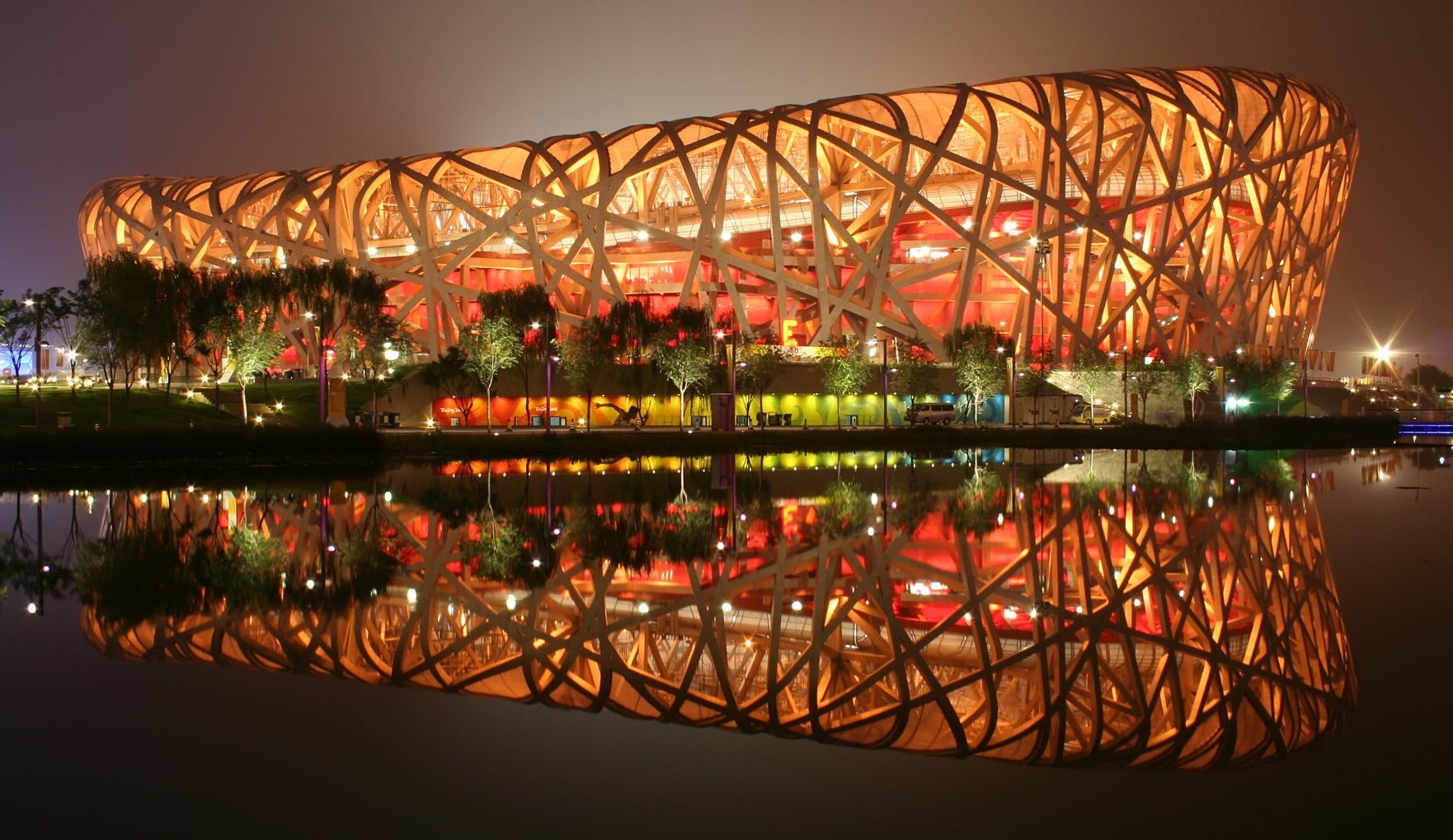
The Beijing National Stadium where Shareef and Reesha competed in track and field events.

The Maldives was represented by a male athlete and a female athlete in athletics at the 2008 Summer Olympics, Ali Shareef and Aishath Reesha. At the age of 29, Ali Shareef was the country's oldest competitor, and was competing at his first Olympics. He competed on 15 August in Beijing, and finished 7th out of 8 in heat six. His time of 11.11 seconds placed him 69th out of 80 competitors overall. The fastest athlete was Tyrone Edgar finishing with a time of 10.13 seconds and the slowest athlete that progressed to the semi-finals was Uchenna Emedolu who finished with a time of 10.46 seconds. Shareef, who was 0.65 seconds behind Emedolu, did not progress to the semi-finals.

Competing at her first Olympics, Aishath Reesha was the only female competing in the track and field events at the 2008 Summer Olympics for Maldives. She competed in the 800 metres on 15 August. Reesha was drawn into heat five for the event. She ran a personal best time of 2 minutes and 30.14 seconds. She finished seventh and last in her heat, almost 30 seconds behind the winner, Zulia Calatayud. She finished last out of 39 athletes overall. Reesha was 31.23 seconds behind the fastest athlete Maria Mutola and 26.29 seconds behind the slowest athlete who progressed to the semi-finals, Élodie Guégan. Therefore, Reesha did not progress to the semi-finals.

Key

- Note–Ranks given for track events are within the athlete's heat only
- Q = Qualified for the next round
- q = Qualified for the next round as a fastest loser or, in field events, by position without achieving the qualifying target
- NR = National record
- N/A = Round not applicable for the event
- Bye = Athlete not required to compete in round

Men

| Athlete | Event | Heat | | Quarterfinal | | Semifinal | | Final | |
| Athlete | Event | Result | Rank | Result | Rank | Result | Rank | Result | Rank |
|---|---|---|---|---|---|---|---|---|---|
| Ali Shareef | 100 m | 11.11 NR | 7 | Did not advance | | | | | |

Women

| Athlete | Event | Heat | | Semifinal | | Final | |
| Athlete | Event | Result | Rank | Result | Rank | Result | Rank |
|---|---|---|---|---|---|---|---|
| Aishath Reesha | 800 m | 2:30.14 PB | 7 | Did not advance | | | |

== Swimming ==
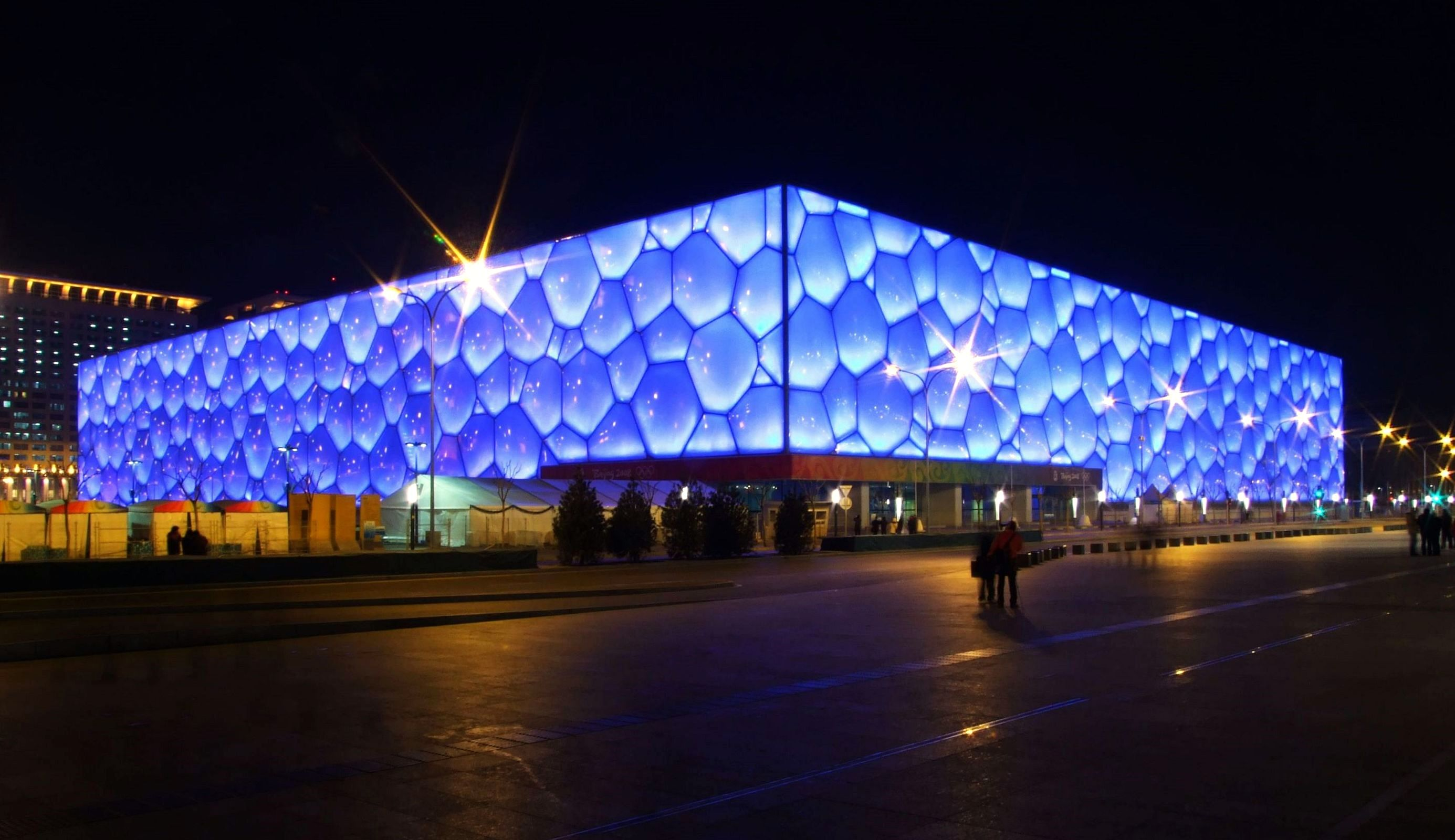
The Beijing National Aquatics Centre where the swimming events took place.

Swimmer Ibrahim Shameel was the youngest athlete to participate in the Maldivian delegation at Beijing; he was sixteen years old at the time of his performance, and the only male swimmer in the delegation. Shameel has not previously appeared at any Olympic games. The preliminary round for the men's 50 meters freestyle, the event in which he participated, took place on August 15. Shameel was placed in the third heat. He completed his event in 29.28 seconds, taking seventh in the heat. Out of the 97 athletes who participated in the preliminary round, Shameel ranked 88th. He did not advance to later rounds.

Then 17-year-old Aminath Rouya Hussain participated on Maldives's behalf in the women's 50 meters freestyle. Her participation in Beijing marked her second Olympic appearance, as she had participated previously in women's 50 meters freestyle at the 2004 Summer Olympics in Athens. She was the only female Maldivian swimmer participating in the Beijing games. During the August 15 preliminary round, Rouya participated in the fourth heat. She completed her event in 30.21 seconds, ranking seventh out of the eight athletes in the heat. Overall, Rouya ranked 72 out of the 90 athletes who participated in the event. (Note: Two swimmers, Miroslava Najdanovski and Bayan Jumah, did not start.) She did not advance to later rounds.

Men

| Athlete | Event | Heat | | Semifinal | | Final | |
| Athlete | Event | Result | Rank | Result | Rank | Result | Rank |
|---|---|---|---|---|---|---|---|
| Ibrahim Shameel | 50 m freestyle | 29.28 | 88 | Did not advance | | | |

Women

| Athlete | Event | Heat | | Semifinal | | Final | |
| Athlete | Event | Result | Rank | Result | Rank | Result | Rank |
|---|---|---|---|---|---|---|---|
| Aminath Rouya Hussain | 50 m freestyle | 30.21 | 72 | Did not advance | | | |

== See also ==
- List of Maldivian records in athletics
- Maldives at the Olympics
