= 2006 Asian Swimming Championships =

Swimming

7th Asian Swimming Championships
- Host city: Singapore
- Date(s): March 5 – 10, 2006
- Venue(s): 1

The 7th Asian Swimming Championships were swum March 5–10, 2006 at the Singapore Sports School in Singapore. The championships was organized by the Asia Swimming Federation (AASF), and featured competition in 40 long course Swimming events.

== Participating nations ==
Nations with swimmers at the 2006 Asian Championships included:

- China
- Chinese Taipei
- Hong Kong
- India
- Indonesia
- Japan
- Kazakhstan
- Kyrgyzstan
- Kuwait
- Macao
- Mongolia
- Oman
- Pakistan
- Philippines
- Singapore
- South Korea
- Thailand
- Uzbekistan

== Event schedule ==
All events were swum prelims and finals (save the 800 and 1500 freestyles), with the top-8 finishers from prelims advancing to swim a second time in finals. The 800 and 1500 free events were swum as timed-final (i.e. each swimmer only swam once).

Date	Sunday 5 March	Monday 6 March	Tuesday 7 March	Wednesday 8 March	Thursday 9 March	Friday 10 March
E v e n t s	800 free (m); 100 free (w); 100 breast (m); 400 IM (w); 200 free (m); 4x200 Free Relay (w); 50 back (m)	1500 free (w); 100 fly (m); 200 free (w); 400 IM 9m); 200 breast (w); 4x200 Free Relay (m); 50 fly (w)	400 free (w); 100 free (m); 100 back (w); 200 back (m); 4x100 Free Relay (w); 50 breast (m)	100 fly (w); 400 free (m); 50 breast (w); 200 breast (m); 50 back (w); 4x100 Free Relay (m)	1500 free (m); 800 free (w); 200 fly (m); 200 IM (w); 100 back (m); 4x100 Medley Relay (w); 50 free (m)	200 fly (w); 200 IM (m); 200 back (w); 50 fly (m); 100 breast (w); 4x100 Medley Relay (m); 50 free (w)

== Results ==
=== Men ===
Event	Gold		Silver		Bronze	
50m free	Cai Li; China	23.38	Xu Lei; China	23.78	Ravil Nachaev; Uzbekistan	23.82
100m free	Huang Shaohua; China	50.11; CR	Chen Zuo; China	50.41	Lim Nam-Gyun; South Korea	51.76
200m free	Yu Chenglong; China	1:50.67; CR	Qu Jingyu; China	1:52.54	Bryan Tay; Singapore	1:53.26
400m free	Yu Cheng; China	3:54.27; CR	Ji Zhixiang; China	3:55.10	Taishi Okude; Japan	3:59.48
800m free	Xin Tong; China	8:15.69	Kang Yong-Hwan; South Korea	8:19.30	Shi Haoran; China	8:20.10
1500m free	Ji Zhixiang; China	15:28.33; CR	Yu Cheng; China	15:48.40	Kang Yong-Hwan; South Korea	15:59.76
50m back	Ouyang Kunpeng; China	25.71; CR	Feng Lizhong; China	26.49	Danil Bugakov; Uzbekistan	27.57
100m back	Ouyang Kunpeng; China	54.60; CR	Zhang Bodong; China	56.46	Kim Ji-Heun; South Korea	59.06
200m back	Ouyang Kunpeng; China	1:58.88; CR	Zhang Bodong; China	2:00.92	Sergey Pankov; Uzbekistan	2:06.48
50m breast	Wang Haibo; China	28.49	Wang Mengjian; China	28.66	Koichiro Okazaki; Japan	28.77
100m breast	Xie Zhi; China	1:01.93; CR	Yuta Suenaga; Japan	1:02.73	Koichiro Okazaki; Japan	1:03.15
200m breast	Xie Zhi; China	2:14.74; CR	Lai Zhongjian; China	2:15.52	Yuichi Narisawa; Japan	2:15.93
50m fly	Zhou Jiawei; China	24.11	Huang Changrui; China	24.80	Oleg Lyashko; Uzbekistan	24.98
100m fly	Wang Dong; China	53.92	Chen Yin; China	54.64	Shota Takamoto; Japan	54.69
200m fly	Chen Yin; China	1:57.31; CR	Zheng Huazhang; China	1:59.78	Shota Takamoto; Japan	2:00.24
200m IM	Zhao Tao; China	2:01.10; CR	Qu Jingyu; China	2:02.19	Taishi Okude; Japan	2:03.94
400m IM	Zhao Tao; China	4:20.43; CR	Li Zhiqiang; China	4:22.45	Taishi Okude; Japan	4:22.46
4 × 100 m free relay	China; Cai Li, Shi Runqiang, Chen Zuo, Huang Shaohua	3:22.60; CR	Uzbekistan; Sergey Tsoy, Petr Vasilev, Danil Bugakov, Ravil Nachaev	3:30.54	Hong Kong; Geoffrey Cheah, Yee Hoi Ping, Cheung Siu Hang, Eric Chan	3:31.28
4 × 200 m free relay	China; Qu Jingyu, Xin Tong, Chen Zuo, Yu Chenglong	7:29.09; CR	Singapore; Bryan Tay, Thum Bing Ming, Gary Tan, Marcus Cheah	7:40.42	South Korea; Sim Ki-Hyuk, Chung Yong, Park Beom-Ho, Lim Nam-Gyun	7:42.46
4 × 100 m medley relay	China; Ouyang Kunpeng, Xie Zhi, Wang Dong, Huang Shaohua	3:42.04; CR	South Korea; Kim Ji-Heun, Sin Su-Jong, Chung Yong, Lim Nam-Gyun	3:50.63	Chinese Taipei; Yuan Ping, Wang Wei-Wen, Hsu Chu-Chieh, Tsai Kuo-Chuan	3:52.48

=== Women ===
Event	Gold		Silver		Bronze	
50m free	Hannah Wilson; Hong Kong	26.14	SUN Wenting; China	26.37	WANG Dan; China	26.42
100m free	Hannah Wilson; Hong Kong	56.73	WANG Dan; China	56.86	YANG Chin-Kuei; Chinese Taipei	57.01
200m free	TANG Jingzhi; China	2:00.45; CR	LU Ying; China	2:02.78	PARK Na-Ri; China	2:02.86
400m free	TANG Jingzhi; China	4:11.46; CR	LI Mo; China	4:13.67	YANG Chin-Kuei; Chinese Taipei	4:23.44
800m free	YU Rui; China	8:44.51	LI Mo; China	8:47.93	JUNG Ea-Hyun; South Korea	8:59.30
1500m free	YU Rui; China	16:36.46	YANG Jing; China	16:37.60	JUNG Ea-Hyun; South Korea	17:21.78
50m back	ZHAO Jing; China	28.50	Masaki Oikawa; Japan	29.24	Chen Yanyan; China	29.37
100m back	Toshie Abe; Japan	1:02.61	Chen Yanyan; China	1:02.68	Masaki Oikawa; Japan	1:02.74
200m back	ZHAO Jing; China	2:09.58; CR	Toshie Abe; Japan	2:12.59	JUNG Yoo-Jin; South Korea	2:14.92
50m breast	JI Liping; China	31.71	WANG Qun; China	31.93	SUEN Ka Yi; Hong Kong	33.08
100m breast	JI Liping; China	1:08.61; CR	WANG Qun; China	1:09.01	JUNG Seul-Ki; South Korea	1:10.92
200m breast	LUO Nan; China	2:26.44	WANG Qun; China	2:28.92	JUNG Seul-Ki; South Korea	2:29.70
50m fly	TAO Li; Singapore	26.92	Joscelin Yeo; Singapore	27.37	GUO Fan; China	27.57
100m fly	QU Jing; China	59.46	HONG Wenwen; China	59.77	TAO Li; Singapore	1:00.11
200m fly	JIAO Liuyang; China	2:08.54; CR	LI Jie; China	2:12.69	KOWN You-Ri; South Korea	2:13.51
200m IM	ZHANG Xin; China	2:16.14	ZHANG Chen; China	2:17.07	Toshie Abe; Japan	2:17.34
400m IM	ZHANG Xin; China	4:43.00; CR	YU Rui; China	4:44.08	NAM Yoo-Sun; South Korea	4:51.94
4 × 100 m free relay	China; LU Ying, SUN Wenting, WANG Junyao, WANG Dan	3:48.75	South Korea; LEE Nam-Eun, KIM Dal-Eun, JUNG Yoo-Jin, PARK Na-Ri	3:52.36	Chinese Taipei; NIEH Pin-Cieh, LIN Man-Hsu, CHEN Wan-Jung, YANG Chin-Kuei	3:53.96
4 × 200 m free relay	China; TANG Jingzhi, LU Ying, WANG Junyao, WANG Dan	8:15.88; CR	South Korea; JUNG Yoo-Jin, JUNG Seul-Ki, KOWN You-Ri, PARK Na-Ri	8:27.04	Chinese Taipei, LIN Man-Hsu,,	8:31.53
4 × 100 m medley relay	China; Chen Yanyan, WANG Qun, HONG Wenwen, TANG Jingzhi	4:07.96	South Korea; JUNG Yoo-Jin, JUNG Seul-Ki, KOWN You-Ri, PARK Na-Ri	4:13.81	Singapore; Lynette Ng, Joscelin Yeo, TAO Li, HO Shu Yong	4:19.38

=== Medal table ===
Rank	Nation	Gold	Silver	Bronze	Total
1	China (CHN)	36	29	5	70
2	Hong Kong (HKG)	2	0	2	4
3	Japan (JPN)	1	3	10	14
4	Singapore (SIN)	1	2	3	6
5	South Korea (KOR)	0	5	11	16
6	Uzbekistan (UZB)	0	1	4	5
7	Chinese Taipei (TPE)	0	0	5	5
Totals (7 entries)		40	40	40	120

== See also ==
- Swimming at the 2006 Asian Games
