= Swimming at the 2008 Summer Olympics – Men's 50 metre freestyle =

Men's 50 metre freestyle at the Games of the XXIX Olympiad
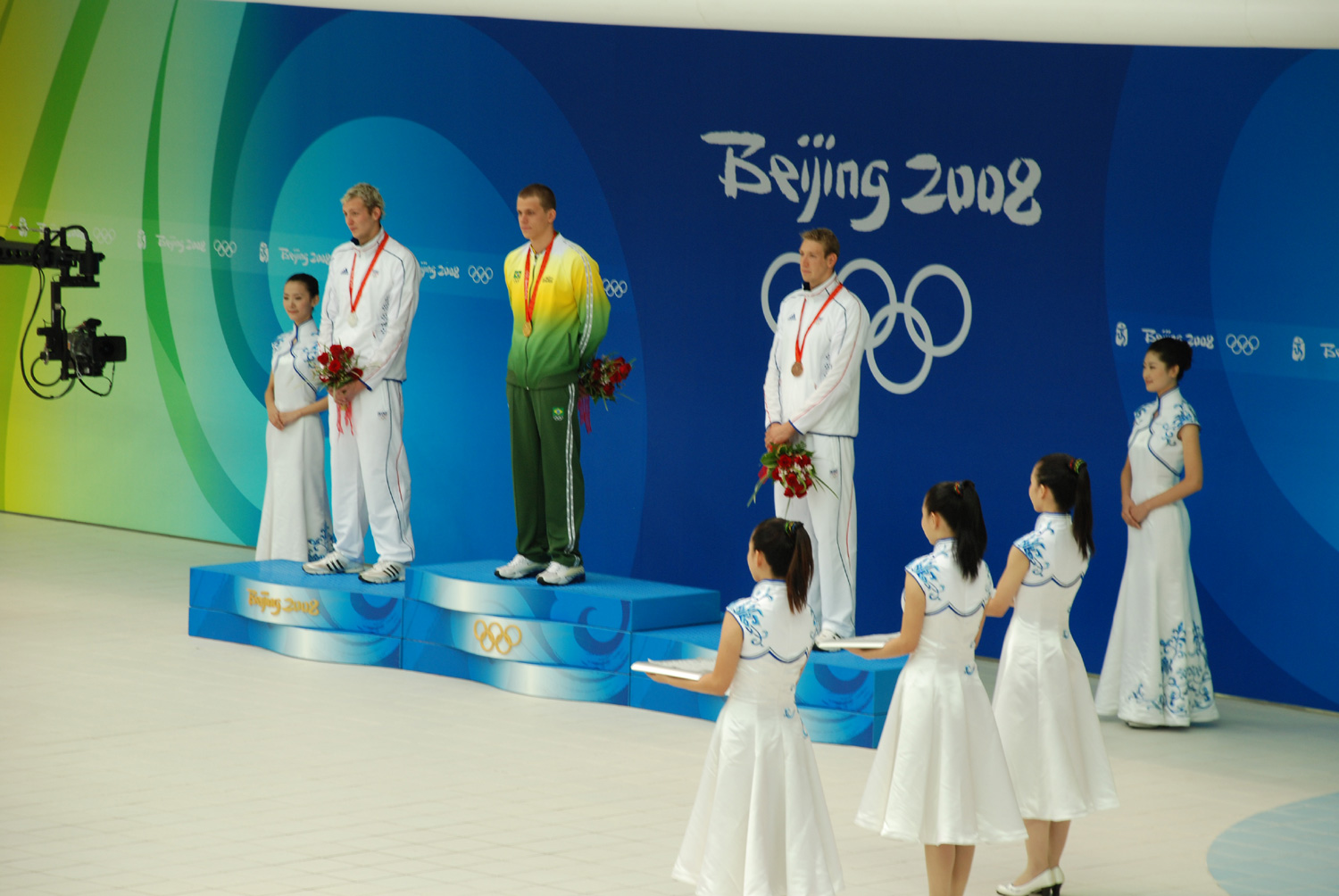
- The medal ceremony of the 50m final.
- Venue: Beijing National Aquatics Center
- Dates: August 14, 2008 (heats); August 15, 2008 (semifinals); August 16, 2008 (final)
- Competitors: 97 from 90 nations
- Winning time: 21.30 OR

Medalists
1st place, gold medalist(s)		César Cielo	Brazil
2nd place, silver medalist(s)		Amaury Leveaux	France
3rd place, bronze medalist(s)		Alain Bernard	France

The men's 50 metre freestyle event at the 2008 Summer Olympics took place on 14–16 August at the Beijing National Aquatics Center in Beijing, China.

César Cielo made an Olympic milestone to become Brazil's first ever gold medalist in swimming. He rocketed to an unexpected triumph in a new Olympic record of 21.30, then the second-fastest in history, powering past the field by 0.15 of a second, a sizable chunk in Olympic swimming's shortest race. The French tandem of Amaury Leveaux and Alain Bernard took home the silver and bronze with respective times of 21.45 and 21.49.

Australia's Ashley Callus finished fourth in 21.62, while his teammate and world record holder Eamon Sullivan was a fraction behind the leading pack in sixth at 21.65. For the first time in Olympic history, no American swimmer had reached the podium in the event, as the reigning world champion Ben Wildman-Tobriner, swimming on the outside in lane eight, pulled off a fifth-place effort in 21.64. Competing at their third Olympics, South Africa's Roland Schoeman (21.67) and Sweden's Stefan Nystrand (21.72) rounded out the finale in seventh and eighth place, respectively.

Earlier in the prelims, Cielo posted a time of 21.47 to erase Alexander Popov's 1992 Olympic record by 0.44 of a second. One heat later, Leveaux established the same record by winning the twelfth heat in 21.46. The following morning, in the semifinals, Cielo lowered again an Olympic record to 21.34 that had been set by Leveaux in the preliminaries under 0.12 seconds.

== Records ==
Prior to this competition, the existing world and Olympic records were as follows.

World record	Eamon Sullivan (AUS)	21.28	Sydney, Australia	28 March 2008	
Olympic record	Alexander Popov (EUN)	21.91	Barcelona, Spain	30 July 1992	-

The following records were established during the competition:

Date	Event	Name	Nationality	Time	Record
14 August	Heat 11	César Cielo	Brazil	21.47	OR
14 August	Heat 12	Amaury Leveaux	France	21.46	OR
15 August	Semifinal 1	César Cielo	Brazil	21.34	OR
16 August	Final	César Cielo	Brazil	21.30	OR

== Qualification ==
The A standard for the event was 22.35 seconds. Up to two swimmers per National Olympic Committee (NOC) could qualify by swimming that time at an approved qualification event. The B standard was 23.13 seconds. Up to one swimmer per NOC meeting that time could qualify. NOCs without a male swimmer qualified in any event could also use their universality place.

== Competition format ==
The competition consisted of three rounds: heats, semifinals, and a final. The swimmers with the best 16 times in the heats advanced to the semifinals. The swimmers with the best 8 times in the semifinals advanced to the final. Swim-offs were used as necessary to break ties for advancement to the next round.

== Results ==
=== Heats ===
The swimmers with the top 16 times, regardless of heat, advanced to the semifinals.

Rank	Heat	Lane	Name	Nation	Time	Notes
1	12	4	Amaury Leveaux	France	21.46	Q, OR
2	11	5	César Cielo	Brazil	21.47	Q, =AM
3	12	3	Stefan Nystrand	Sweden	21.75	Q
3	12	5	Ben Wildman-Tobriner	United States	21.75	Q
5	13	3	Roland Schoeman	South Africa	21.76	Q
6	11	1	George Bovell	Trinidad and Tobago	21.77	Q
7	13	5	Alain Bernard	France	21.78	Q
8	13	4	Eamon Sullivan	Australia	21.79	Q
9	11	4	Garrett Weber-Gale	United States	21.95	Q
10	12	7	Rafed El-Masri	Germany	21.96	Q
11	11	7	Nicholas Santos	Brazil	22.00	Q
12	11	3	Duje Draganja	Croatia	22.05	Q
13	13	2	Ashley Callus	Australia	22.11	Q
14	12	6	Krisztián Takács	Hungary	22.14	Q
15	11	6	Bartosz Kizierowski	Poland	22.15	Q
16	12	2	Gideon Louw	South Africa	22.17	Q
17	12	1	Andrey Grechin	Russia	22.20	
18	10	4	Jernej Godec	Slovenia	22.21	
19	8	4	Flori Lang	Switzerland	22.27	
20	9	1	David Dunford	Kenya	22.29	
21	13	1	Yevgeny Lagunov	Russia	22.30	
22	11	2	Javier Noriega	Spain	22.33	
23	13	6	Mark Foster	Great Britain	22.35	
23	13	8	Salim Iles	Algeria	22.35	
25	9	6	Miko Mälberg	Estonia	22.37	NR
26	10	5	Apostolos Tsagkarakis	Greece	22.39	
27	10	6	Richard Hortness	Canada	22.42	
28	10	7	Yoris Grandjean	Belgium	22.45	
29	10	1	Matti Rajakylä	Finland	22.48	
30	9	3	Cai Li	China	22.50	
30	9	7	Alessandro Calvi	Italy	22.50	
32	10	3	Robert Lijesen	Netherlands	22.51	
33	10	2	Jakob Andkjær	Denmark	22.52	
34	8	8	Jacinto de Jesus Ayala Benjamin	Dominican Republic	22.57	
35	10	8	José Meolans	Argentina	22.58	
36	9	2	Andrei Radzionau	Belarus	22.65	NR
37	11	8	Kaan Tayla	Turkey	22.66	
38	13	7	Steffen Deibler	Germany	22.67	
39	9	8	Daniel Coakley	Philippines	22.69	
40	9	5	Virdhawal Khade	India	22.73	
41	7	4	Oliver Elliot	Chile	22.75	NR
42	8	3	Yuriy Yegoshin	Ukraine	22.77	
43	7	2	Norbert Trandafir	Romania	22.80	
44	7	8	Árni Már Árnason	Iceland	22.81	NR
45	7	5	Jevon Atkinson	Jamaica	22.83	NR
45	8	1	Mohammad Madwa	Kuwait	22.83	
47	8	6	Jonathan Javier Camacho Riera	Venezuela	22.87	
48	7	6	Stanislav Kuzmin	Kazakhstan	22.91	
49	9	4	Camilo Becerra	Colombia	22.93	
50	8	5	Francisco Picasso	Uruguay	23.01	
51	7	3	Martyn Forde	Barbados	23.08	
52	8	2	Elvis Burrows	Bahamas	23.19	
53	7	1	Joshua Laban	Virgin Islands	23.28	
54	12	8	Mohamed El Nady	Egypt	23.92	
55	6	4	Yellow Yeiyah	Nigeria	24.00	
56	7	7	Vitaly Vasilyev	Kyrgyzstan	24.02	
57	6	5	Rodion Davelaar	Netherlands Antilles	24.21	
58	8	7	Rolandas Gimbutis	Lithuania	24.36	
59	6	6	Anas Hamadeh	Jordan	24.40	
60	6	2	Luke Hall	Swaziland	24.41	
61	5	7	Alain Brigion Tobe	Cameroon	24.53	
62	1	4	Alois Dansou	Benin	24.54	
63	5	5	Sidni Hoxha	Albania	24.56	
64	1	5	Omar Jasim	Bahrain	24.65	
65	5	4	Zane Jordan	Zambia	24.82	
66	6	1	Daniel Lee	Sri Lanka	24.92	
67	6	7	Chakyl Camal	Mozambique	24.93	NR
68	5	3	Andrey Molchanov	Turkmenistan	25.02	
69	6	8	Niall Roberts	Guyana	25.13	
70	5	6	Kerson Hadley	Federated States of Micronesia	25.34	
71	4	4	Stewart Glenister	American Samoa	25.45	
72	5	1	John Kamyuka	Botswana	25.54	
73	4	3	Hamse Abdouh	Palestine	25.60	
74	5	2	Adil Baig	Pakistan	25.66	
75	1	3	Omar Núñez	Nicaragua	26.00	
76	5	8	Kouassi Brou	Ivory Coast	26.08	
77	4	5	Kyaw Zin	Myanmar	26.17	
78	4	6	Tural Abbasov	Azerbaijan	26.31	
79	4	1	Hemthon Ponloeu	Cambodia	27.39	
80	3	5	Charlton Nyirenda	Malawi	27.46	
81	4	7	Prasiddha Jung Shah	Nepal	27.59	
82	4	8	Gilbert Kaburu	Uganda	27.72	
83	3	3	Jackson Niyomugabo	Rwanda	27.74	
84	3	7	Khalid Rushaka	Tanzania	28.50	
85	3	6	Dwayne Didon	Seychelles	28.95	
86	3	8	Mohamed Coulibaly	Mali	29.09	
87	3	1	Alisher Chingizov	Tajikistan	29.10	
88	3	2	Ibrahim Shameel	Maldives	29.28	
89	3	4	Mamadou Cisse	Guinea	29.29	
90	2	3	Thepphithak Chindavong	Laos	29.31	
91	6	3	Mohamed Attoumane	Comoros	29.63	
92	2	6	Rene Jacob Yougbara	Burkina Faso	30.08	
93	4	2	Ahmed Adam	Sudan	30.12	
94	2	4	Abdulsalam Al Gadabi	Yemen	30.63	NR
95	2	5	Mohamed Alhousseini Alhassan	Niger	30.90	
96	2	2	Kareem Valentine	Antigua and Barbuda	31.23	
97	2	7	Stany Kempompo Ngangola	Democratic Republic of the Congo	35.19	

=== Semifinals ===
The swimmers with the top 8 times, regardless of heat, advanced to the final.

Rank	Heat	Lane	Name	Nation	Time	Notes
1	1	4	César Cielo Filho	Brazil	21.34	Q, OR, AM
2	2	6	Alain Bernard	France	21.54	Q
3	2	1	Ashley Callus	Australia	21.68	Q
4	1	5	Stefan Nystrand	Sweden	21.71	Q
5	2	3	Roland Schoeman	South Africa	21.74	Q
6	1	6	Eamon Sullivan	Australia	21.75	Q
7	2	4	Amaury Leveaux	France	21.76	Q
7	2	5	Ben Wildman-Tobriner	United States	21.76	Q
9	1	1	Krisztián Takács	Hungary	21.84	
10	1	7	Duje Draganja	Croatia	21.85	
11	1	3	George Bovell	Trinidad and Tobago	21.86	
12	1	8	Gideon Louw	South Africa	21.97	
13	2	2	Garrett Weber-Gale	United States	22.08	
14	1	2	Rafed El-Masri	Germany	22.09	
15	2	8	Bartosz Kizierowski	Poland	22.12	
16	2	7	Nicholas Santos	Brazil	22.15	

=== Final ===
Rank	Lane	Name	Nation	Time	Notes
1st place, gold medalist(s)	4	César Cielo	Brazil	21.30	OR, AM
2nd place, silver medalist(s)	1	Amaury Leveaux	France	21.45	
3rd place, bronze medalist(s)	5	Alain Bernard	France	21.49	
4	3	Ashley Callus	Australia	21.62	
5	8	Ben Wildman-Tobriner	United States	21.64	
6	7	Eamon Sullivan	Australia	21.65	
7	2	Roland Schoeman	South Africa	21.67	AF
8	6	Stefan Nystrand	Sweden	21.72	
