= Li Mo =

Chinese swimmer (born 1990)

Personal information
- Native name: 李茉
- Born: 21 January 1990 (age 36) Jinan, Shandong, China

Sport
- Sport: Swimming
- Strokes: Freestyle
Medal record
Women's swimming
Representing China
Asian Championships
Silver medal – second place	2006 Singapore	400 m freestyle
Silver medal – second place	2006 Singapore	800 m freestyle

Li Mo (Chinese: 李茉; born 21 January 1990 in Jinan, Shandong) is a Chinese swimmer, who competed for Team China at the 2008 Summer Olympics.

== Major achievements ==
- 2002 Asian Games - 1st 50 m/100 m free
- 2002 Asian Games - 1st 50 m back
- 2005 National Games - 2nd 400 m free, 3rd 800 m free
- 2006 Asian Championships - 2nd 400 m/800 m free
