= Alain Brigion Tobe =

Cameroonian swimmer (born 1986)

Personal information
- Born: November 6, 1986 (age 39)

Sport
- Sport: Swimming

Alain Brigion Tobe (born November 6, 1986) is a Cameroonian swimmer, who specialized in sprint freestyle events. Tobe represented Cameroon at the 2008 Summer Olympics in Beijing, and competed for the men's 50 m freestyle. He won the fifth heat in the event, with a time of 24.53 seconds, finishing sixty-first in the overall standings.
