= Miko Mälberg =

Estonian swimmer

Personal information
- Full name: Miko Mälberg
- Nationality: Estonia
- Born: 3 May 1985 (age 41) Tallinn, then part of Estonian SSR, Soviet Union

Sport
- Sport: Swimming
- College team: Louisiana State University

Miko Mälberg (born 3 May 1985 in Tallinn) is an Estonian freestyle swimmer. He competed for his native country at the 2008 Summer Olympics in Beijing, China, where he finished in 25th place in the men's 50 metre freestyle clocking 22.37 seconds in the preliminary.

== See also ==
- List of Estonian records in swimming
