= Swimming at the 2006 Asian Games – Men's 50 metre freestyle =

Men's 50 metre freestyle at the 2006 Asian Games
- Venue: Hamad Aquatic Centre
- Date: 4 December 2006
- Competitors: 39 from 24 nations

Medalists
gold medal	Rafed Al-Masri	Syria
silver medal	Makoto Ito	Japan
bronze medal	Cai Li	China

The men's 50m freestyle swimming event at the 2006 Asian Games was held on December 4, 2006 at the Hamad Aquatic Centre in Doha, Qatar.

== Schedule ==
All times are Arabia Standard Time (UTC+03:00)

Date	Time	Event
Monday, 4 December 2006	10:07	Heats
Monday, 4 December 2006	18:05	Final

== Records ==
Prior to this competition, the existing world, Asian and Games records were as follows.

World Record	Aleksandr Popov (RUS)	21.64	Moscow, Russia	16 June 2000
Asian Record	Tomohiro Yamanoi (JPN)	22.18	Fukuoka, Japan	23 July 2001
Games Record	Jiang Chengji (CHN)	22.38	Bangkok, Thailand	11 December 1998

== Results ==
Legend

- DSQ — Disqualified

=== Heats ===
Rank	Heat	Athlete	Time	Notes
1	4	Rafed Al-Masri (SYR)	22.96	
2	5	Makoto Ito (JPN)	23.05	
3	3	Cai Li (CHN)	23.16	
4	3	Daisuke Hosokawa (JPN)	23.23	
5	4	Mohammad Madwa (KUW)	23.49	
6	4	Ravil Nachaev (UZB)	23.53	
7	5	Sung Min (KOR)	23.54	
8	3	Vitaliy Khan (KAZ)	23.55	
9	3	Wang Shao-an (TPE)	23.56	
10	5	Arwut Chinnapasaen (THA)	23.63	
11	1	Alexandr Sklyar (KAZ)	23.70	
12	4	Lao Kuan Fong (MAC)	23.86	
13	3	Daniel Coakley (PHI)	23.98	
14	5	Kim Min-suk (KOR)	23.99	
15	5	Harbeth Fu (HKG)	24.00	
16	4	Virdhawal Khade (IND)	24.01	
17	4	Hamid Reza Mobarrez (IRI)	24.23	
18	5	Eric Chan (HKG)	24.26	
19	5	Petr Romashkin (UZB)	24.39	
20	5	Pasha Vahdati (IRI)	24.40	
21	4	Vasilii Danilov (KGZ)	24.47	
22	4	Kendrick Uy (PHI)	24.54	
23	3	Obaid Al-Jasmi (UAE)	24.59	
24	2	Ankur Poseria (IND)	24.70	
25	2	Moyssara El-Aarag (QAT)	24.94	
26	3	Mohammed Al-Khudhori (OMA)	25.08	
27	2	Daniel Lee (SRI)	25.16	
28	3	Nawaf Haidar (KUW)	25.51	
29	2	Andryein Tamir (MGL)	25.65	
30	2	Tang Chon Kit (MAC)	25.81	
31	2	Milinda Wickramasinghe (SRI)	25.83	
32	1	Jewel Ahmed (BAN)	26.47	
33	2	Mohammed Hassan (QAT)	26.71	
34	2	Fadi Awesat (PLE)	26.83	
35	1	Sovan Nareth (CAM)	26.96	
36	1	Mendbayaryn Batchuluun (MGL)	27.70	
37	1	Issam Halawani (PLE)	27.94	
38	1	Ali Mohamed Raaidh (MDV)	30.32	
—	1	Hassan Ashraf (MDV)	DSQ	

=== Final ===
Rank	Athlete	Time	Notes
1st place, gold medalist(s)	Rafed Al-Masri (SYR)	22.41	
2nd place, silver medalist(s)	Makoto Ito (JPN)	22.77	
3rd place, bronze medalist(s)	Cai Li (CHN)	22.95	
4	Daisuke Hosokawa (JPN)	23.15	
5	Ravil Nachaev (UZB)	23.27	
6	Vitaliy Khan (KAZ)	23.32	
7	Sung Min (KOR)	23.36	
8	Mohammad Madwa (KUW)	23.55	
