= Dwayne Didon =

Seychellois swimmer

Personal information
- Full name: Dwayne Benjamin Didon
- Born: September 11, 1994 (age 31)

Sport
- Sport: Swimming

Dwayne Benjamin Didon (born September 11, 1994) is a Seychellois swimmer, who specialized in sprint freestyle events. At age thirteen, Didon became the youngest male swimmer at the 2008 Summer Olympics, representing the island of Seychelles. He swam in the third heat of the men's 50 m freestyle event, finishing in fourth place, and eighty-fifth overall, with a time of 28.95 seconds.
