= Park Beom-ho =

South Korean swimmer (born 1988)

Park Beom-ho OLY
Personal information
- Full name: Park Beom-ho
- National team: South Korea
- Born: 23 May 1988 (age 38) Seoul, South Korea
- Height: 1.72 m (5 ft 7 1/2 in)
- Weight: 62 kg (137 lb)

Sport
- Sport: Swimming
- Strokes: Freestyle, medley
Medal record
Men's swimming
Representing South Korea
Asian Championships
Bronze medal – third place	2006 Singapore	4×200 m freestyle

Park Beom-ho (also Pak Beom-ho, Korean: 박범호; born May 23, 1988) is a South Korean swimmer, who specialized in freestyle and individual medley events. He represented his nation South Korea at the 2008 Summer Olympics, and has won a bronze medal, as a member of the men's 4×200 m freestyle relay team, at the 2006 Asian Championships in Singapore.

Park competed for the South Korean swimming team in the men's 200 m individual medley at the 2008 Summer Olympics in Beijing. He set a new personal best of 2:04.81 to set himself up a fourth seed headed into the final at the Good Luck Beijing China Open six months earlier, finishing under the FINA B-cut (2:05.65) by almost 0.85 of a second. Swimming in heat one, Park pulled from behind on the rear of a dominant freestyle leg to beat two-time Olympians Iurii Zakharov of Kyrgyzstan and Danil Bugakov of Uzbekistan by less than a second for the fifth spot in 2:06.17. Park failed to advance into the semifinals, as he placed forty-fourth overall in the prelims.
