= Jonathan Javier Camacho Riera =

Venezuelan swimmer

Personal information
- Born: October 3, 1985 (age 40)

Sport
- Sport: Swimming

Jonathan Javier Camacho Riera (born 3 October 1985) is a Venezuelan swimmer. He competed in the Men's 50 metre freestyle at the 2008 Summer Olympics.
