= Tural Abbasov =

Azerbaijani swimmer (born 1990)

Personal information
- Full name: Tural Abbasov
- National team: Azerbaijan
- Born: 25 April 1990 (age 36) Baku, Azerbaijani SSR, Soviet Union
- Height: 1.82 m (6 ft 0 in)
- Weight: 76 kg (168 lb)

Sport
- Sport: Swimming
- Strokes: Freestyle

Tural Abbasov (born April 25, 1990) is an Azerbaijani swimmer, who specialized in sprint freestyle events. He represented his nation Azerbaijan at the 2008 Summer Olympics, placing himself among the top 80 swimmers in the 50 m freestyle.

Abbasov was invited by FINA to compete as a lone male swimmer for Azerbaijan in the men's 50 m freestyle at the 2008 Summer Olympics in Beijing. Swimming in heat four, Abbasov raced his way to fourth place in a splash-and-dash finish with a lifetime best of 26.31 seconds. Abbasov failed to advance into the semifinals, as he placed seventy-eighth overall out of ninety-seven swimmers in the prelims.
