= Danil Bugakov =

Uzbek swimmer (born 1988)

Personal information
- Full name: Danil Bugakov
- Nickname: The Bullet (Patrone)
- National team: Uzbekistan
- Born: 29 January 1988 (age 38) Tashkent, Uzbek SSR, Soviet Union
- Height: 1.88 m (6 ft 2 in)
- Weight: 69 kg (152 lb)

Sport
- Sport: Swimming
- Strokes: Freestyle, backstroke, medley
- Club: Wasserfreunde 98 (GER)
- Coach: Frank Lamodke (GER); Natalya Obuhova
Medal record
Men's swimming
Representing Uzbekistan
Asian Championships
Silver medal – second place	2006 Singapore	4×100 m freestyle
Bronze medal – third place	2006 Singapore	50 m backstroke
Bronze medal – third place	2009 Foshan	50 m backstroke
Bronze medal – third place	2009 Foshan	4×100 m freestyle

Danil Bugakov (Uzbek: Данил Бугаков; born January 29, 1988) is an Uzbek former swimmer, who specialized in backstroke, freestyle and individual medley events. He won two medals for the 50 m backstroke at the Asian Swimming Championships (2006 in Singapore, and 2009 in Foshan, China). He is also the brother of freestyle swimmer and three-time Olympian Mariya Bugakova.

== Swimming career ==
Bugakov started his swimming career at the very young age, and came from a sporting family, in which his parents were both trained in the pool as "working reserves" (Trudovie rezervi). In 2002, he first competed at the Asian Age Group Championships in Hong Kong, where he became a junior champion in the backstroke category. Bugakov made his official debut, as a 16-year-old, at the 2004 Summer Olympics in Athens, where he competed in the men's 100 m backstroke. With a slight experience in an international level, he recorded the second-slowest time of 1:02.28 in the preliminary heats, finishing only in forty-third place.

Bugakov had received numerous achievements in swimming at the peak of his career. In 2005, he captured a total of seven medals, including his silver for the 100 m backstroke, in short course swimming, at the first-ever Asian Indoor Games in Bangkok, Thailand. He also added two medals, including silver for the freestyle relay at the 2006 Asian Swimming Championships in Singapore. At the 2007 FINA World Championships, Bugakov improved his personal best in the 100 m backstroke, by finishing the preliminary heats under one minute, with a time of 58.74 seconds.

Four years after competing in his first Olympics, Bugakov qualified for his second Uzbekistan team, as a 20-year-old, at the 2008 Summer Olympics in Beijing. He cleared FINA B-standard entry times of 57.03 (100 m backstroke) from the Russian Open in Moscow and 2:05.48 (200 m individual medley) from the Kazakhstan Open in Almaty. In the 100 m backstroke, Bugakov posted his personal best of 56.59 seconds to touch the wall first in heat 1 by less than 0.17 of a second ahead of Kazakhstan's Stanislav Osinsky, but finished only in thirty-ninth place. In the 200 m individual medley, Bugakov challenged six other swimmers on the same heat including two-time Olympian Omar Pinzón of Colombia. He rounded out the heat in last place by three seconds behind Kyrgyzstan's Iurii Zakharov, with a slowest preliminary time of 2:10.04.

Bugakov is an economics graduate, major in statistics and mathematics, at the Tashkent State University of Economics. He is also a current member of Wasserfreunde 98 in Hanover, Germany under head coach and trainer Frank Lamodke, and speaks fluent English, German, and Uzbek. He is working in Chubb Malaysia since 2025.
