= Aishath Reesha =

Maldivian middle-distance runner

Personal information
- Born: May 31, 1989 (age 37)
Medal record
Women's athletics
Representing the Maldives
South Asian U20 Championships
| Bronze medal – third place | 2007 Colombo | 4 × 400 m relay |

Aishath Reesha (born May 31, 1989) is a Maldivian track runner. She set national records for the Maldives and competed in the 800 metres at the 2008 Summer Olympics in Beijing.

== Career ==
Reesha won a bronze medal in the 4 × 400 m relay at the 2007 South Asian U20 Athletics Championships. At the 2007 1500 metres World Championships, Reesha finished 12th in her heat and did not advance. In March of the following year at the South Asian Athletics Championships, Reesha set the Maldivian record in the 4 × 400 m, running 4:35.43 seconds to place 4th.

Reesha was coached by Ahmed Faail, and had to train on a soft sand surface because she didn't have access to a synthetic running track. She said, "we can't compete with people from other worlds" and was hoping to run a personal best at the 2008 Olympics. She did improve upon her best, running a time of 2:30.14 to finish 7th in her Olympic heat. Reacting to her performance, she told reporters "I ran a personal best? Really? I am so happy". The Olympic running track was particularly hard on her feet because it differed from the sand she had trained on.

At the 2009 World Championships in the 800 m, Reesha ran another personal best of 2:28.00 minutes to finish 7th in her heat. The time was also a Maldivian record.
