= Rafed El-Masri =

German former swimmer of Syrian origin (born 1982)

Personal information
- Full name: Rafed Ziad El-Masri
- National team: Germany; Syria
- Born: 10 August 1982 (age 43) Clausthal-Zellerfeld, Lower Saxony, West Germany
- Height: 1.92 m (6 ft 4 in)
- Weight: 88 kg (194 lb)

Sport
- Sport: Swimming
- Strokes: Freestyle
- Club: Zehlendorfer TSV von 1888
Medal record
Men's swimming
Representing Syria
Asian Games
Gold medal – first place	2006 Doha	50 m freestyle

Rafed Ziad El-Masri (Arabic: رافد زياد المصري; born August 10, 1982) is a German former swimmer of Syrian origin, who specialized in sprint freestyle events. He is also a four-time national champion for Germany, and a gold medalist for the men's 50 m freestyle event at the 2006 Asian Games in Doha, Qatar, representing his ancestral homeland Syria.

== Swimming career ==
El-Masri was born and raised in Clausthal-Zellerfeld, Lower Saxony, by Syrian immigrants, whom his father studied geology at the Clausthal University of Technology. He moved to Berlin at the age of five, where he eventually started swimming. At the peak of his sporting career, he had won several titles at the national championships for both long and short course swimming events. He also held a dual citizenship for Germany and Syria, which made him eligible to compete in future international competitions.

=== Syria (2004–2007) ===
In 2004, El-Masri became a member of SG Neukölln swimming club in Berlin, and also, trained for the German national team. However, he decided to compete instead for the Syrian Olympic team at the 2004 Summer Olympics in Athens. He qualified for the men's 50 m freestyle event, and swam in the eighth heat against four other competitors including Croatia's Duje Draganja, who eventually won the silver medal in this event. El-Masri finished in fourth place of his assigned heat, with an impressive time of 22.58 seconds. He nearly missed out of the semi-final rounds, as he placed eighteenth in the overall rankings, tying his position with two-time Olympic champion Alexander Popov of Russia, and Johan Kenkhuis of the Netherlands.

El-Masri continued to compete for Syria at two FINA World Championships (2005 in Montreal, and 2007 in Melbourne), but failed to reach his personal best times set at the Olympics. He also won a gold medal for the men's 50 m freestyle at the 2006 Asian Games in Doha, Qatar, with an impressive time of 22.41 seconds, just ahead of Japan's Makoto Ito, and China's Cai Li.

=== Germany (2008–present) ===
Having won the gold medal at the Asian Games, El-Masri made certain doubts in his decision if he could swim for either Syria or Germany, because of his dual citizenship. In 2008, he qualified for the Summer Olympics in Beijing, after finishing second in the 50 m freestyle event at German national trials, just behind Steffen Deibler, with a time of 21.80 seconds. Shortly before the games, El-Masri was given a chance by FINA to switch nationalities, after having represented his country of origin at the previous Olympics, and at the World Championships.

Representing his adopted nation Germany, El-Masri competed in the men's 50 m freestyle, along with his compatriot Deibler, who finished ahead of him in the trials. He challenged seven other swimmers on the twelfth heat, including heavy favorites Amaury Leveaux of France and three-time Olympian Stefan Nystrand of Sweden. El-Masri finished behind U.S. swimmer Ben Wildman-Tobriner in fourth place by 0.21 of a second with a time of 21.96 seconds. El-Masri recorded a tenth fastest time in the preliminary heats to advance further into the semifinals. The following morning, El-Masri fell short in his bid for the final, as he finished the semifinal run with a third slowest time of 22.09 seconds.
