= Ibrahim Shameel =

Maldivian swimmer

Personal information
- Nationality: Maldivian
- Born: October 14, 1991 (age 34)

Sport
- Sport: Swimming

Ibrahim Shameel (born October 14, 1991), widely known as Kaneeru is a Maldivian swimmer. He competed at the 2008 Summer Olympics. Nowadays, Shameel is focussing on contributing back to the society and works at Maldivian Red Crescent.
