= Rodion Davelaar =

Dutch Antillean swimmer (born 1990)

Personal information
- Born: August 6, 1990 (age 35) Willemstad, Curaçao

Sport
- Sport: Swimming

Rodion Rosko Davelaar (born 6 August 1990) is an Antillean swimmer. He competed at the 2008 Summer Olympics in the 50 metre freestyle.
