= Khalid Rushaka =

Tanzanian Olympic swimmer and sports administrator

Personal information
- Full name: Khalid Yahya Rushaka
- Nationality: Tanzanian
- Born: April 26, 1980 (age 45)
- Height: 1.86 m (6 ft 1 in)
- Weight: 87 kg (192 lb)

Sport
- Sport: Swimming
- Strokes: Freestyle

Khalid Yahya Rushaka (born 26 April 1980) is a Tanzanian former competitive swimmer. He represented Tanzania at the 2008 Summer Olympics in the men's 50 metre freestyle, clocking 28.50 in the heats to place 84th overall. Tanzania first sent swimmers to the Olympic Games at Beijing 2008; Rushaka and Magdalena Moshi were part of that initial team.

After his competitive career, Rushaka served as chair of the Tanzania Olympic Committee Athletes’ Commission and helped organise the first National Athletes’ Forum in 2021. In 2025 he was appointed a member of the World Aquatics Masters Committee. He is the Secretary General of the Tanzania Olympians Association for the 2025–2028 term, and head coach of North Coast Swimming Club in Dar es Salaam.

== International competitions ==
- 2008 Summer Olympics – Men's 50 m freestyle: 84th (28.50).
