= Adil Baig =

Pakistani swimmer (born 1983)

Personal information
- Born: February 14, 1983 (age 43)

Sport
- Sport: Swimming
Medal record
Representing Pakistan
South Asian Games
Silver medal – second place	2006 Colombo	4x200m freestyle relay

Adil Baig (born February 14, 1983) is a Pakistani swimmer. He competed at the 2008 Summer Olympics.
