= Kyaw Zin =

Burmese swimmer

Personal information
- Born: Kyaw Zin

Sport
- Sport: Swimming

Kyaw Zin is a Burmese swimmer. He competed in the men’s 50 metre freestyle at the 2008 Summer Olympics.
