= Qu Jingyu =

Chinese swimmer (born 1986)

QU Jingyu
Personal information
- Nationality: China
- Born: October 16, 1986 (age 39) Qiqihar, Heilongjiang, China
- Height: 1.87 m (6 ft 2 in)

Sport
- Sport: Swimming
- Strokes: IM, Breaststroke
Medal record
Representing China
Asian Games
Silver medal – second place	2006 Doha	4x200m freestyle relay

Qu Jingyu (born October 16, 1986 in Qiqihar, Heilongjiang) is an Olympic swimmer from China. He swam for China at the 2008 Olympics.

He also swam for China at the 2007 World Championships.

== Major achievements ==
- 2003 National Intercity Games - 2nd 200 m free;
- 2003 World Military Games - 2nd 400 m IM;
- 2003 National Short-Course Championships - 1st 100 m/200 m IM, 100 m breast;
- 2004 National Champions Tournament - 3rd 200 m free;
- 2005 National Games - 1st 200 m IM

== Records ==
- 2003 National Short-Course Championships - 1:57.58, 200 m IM (NR)
