= Anas Hamadeh =

Jordanian swimmer

Personal information
- Full name: Anas Hamadeh
- National team: Jordan
- Born: 12 March 1989 (age 37) Irbid, Jordan
- Height: 1.89 m (6 ft 2 in)
- Weight: 94 kg (207 lb)

Sport
- Sport: Swimming
- Strokes: Freestyle

Anas Hamadeh (Arabic: أنس حمادة; born March 12, 1989) is a Jordanian swimmer, who specialized in sprint freestyle events. He represented his nation Jordan at the 2008 Summer Olympics.

Hamadeh was invited by FINA to compete for the Jordanian team in the men's 50 m freestyle at the 2008 Summer Olympics in Beijing. Swimming in heat six, he edged out Swaziland's Luke Hall by a hundredth of a second (0.01) to round out the top three in a splash-and-dash finish with a time of 24.40. Hamadeh, however, failed to advance into the semi-finals, as he placed fifty-ninth overall out of ninety-seven swimmers in the prelims.
