= Cai Li =

Chinese swimmer (born 1987)

Personal information
- Native name: 蔡力
- Born: 14 August 1987 (age 38) Zhejiang, China

Sport
- Sport: Swimming
- Strokes: Freestyle
Medal record
Men's swimming
Representing China
Asian Games
Silver medal – second place	2006 Doha	4×100 m freestyle
Bronze medal – third place	2006 Doha	50 m freestyle
East Asian Games
Gold medal – first place	2005 Macau	50 m freestyle
Gold medal – first place	2005 Macau	4×100 m freestyle
Gold medal – first place	2009 Hong Kong	50 m freestyle
Silver medal – second place	2009 Hong Kong	4×100 m freestyle
Asian Championships
Gold medal – first place	2006 Singapore	50 m freestyle
Gold medal – first place	2006 Singapore	4×100 m freestyle
Gold medal – first place	2009 Foshan	50 m freestyle

Cai Li (Chinese: 蔡力; born 14 August 1987 in Zhejiang) is a Chinese swimmer who competed for Team China at the 2008 Summer Olympics.

== Major achievements ==
- 2005 National Games - 1st 50 m free;
- 2005 East Asian Games - 1st 50 m free;
- 2006 Asian Games - 3rd 50 m free

== Records ==
- 2005 National Short-Course Championships - 48.05, 100 m free (AR);
- 2008 National Champions Tournament - 3:17.07, 4×100 m free relay (AR)
