= Chakyl Camal =

Mozambican swimmer

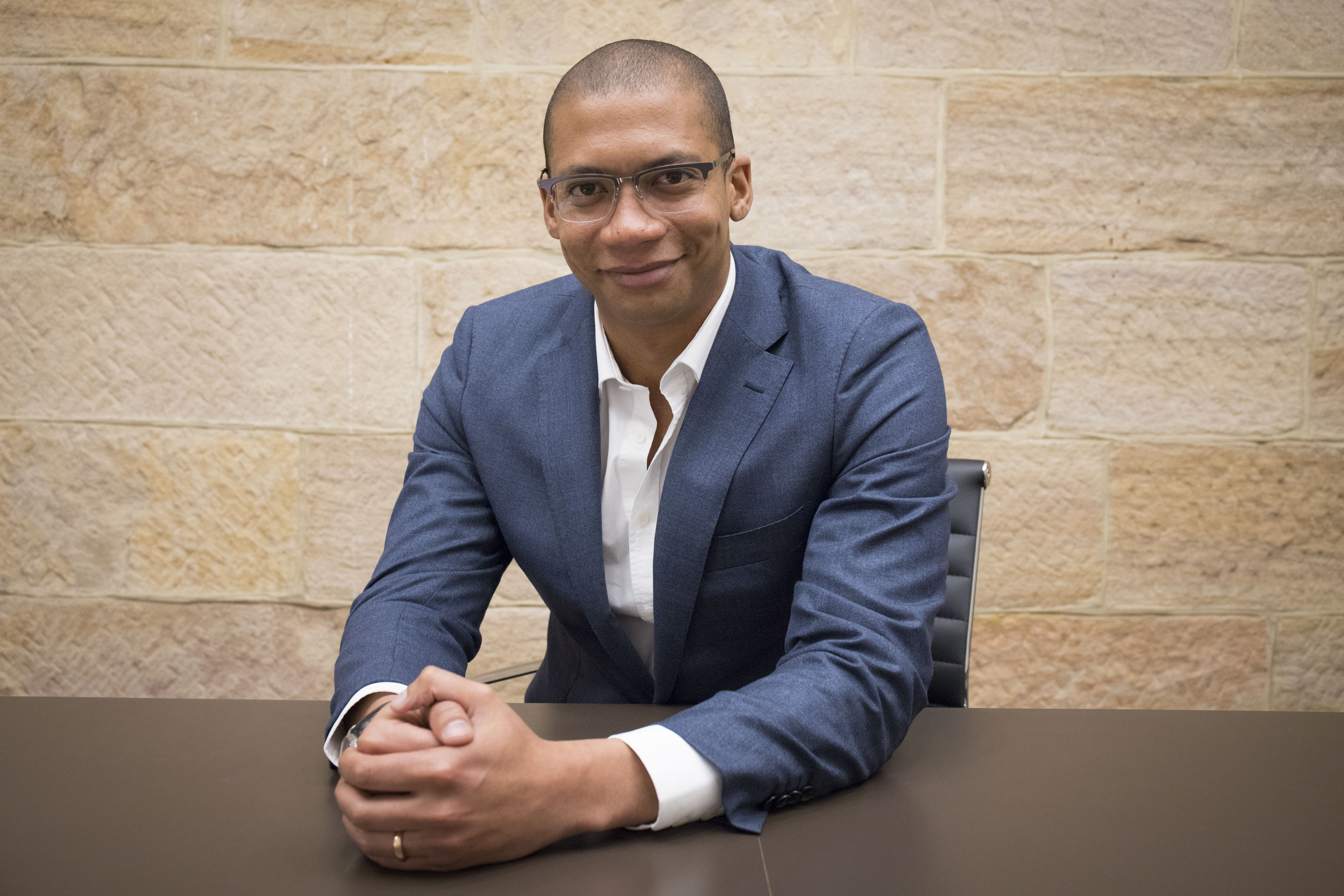
- Camal in 2019
- Born: Chakyl Pfeiffer Camal; March 18, 1990 (age 36); Swaziland
- Occupation: CEO; Entrepreneur; Founder; Olympian
- Years active: 2014–present
- Spouse: Martina Camal (m. 2016)
- Children: 1
- Website: www.chakylcamal.com

Chakyl Pfeiffer Camal (born 18 March 1990, in Mbabane, Swaziland) is an Australian-Mozambican Entrepreneur and former competitive swimmer specializing in freestyle. He competed in the 50 m event at the 2008 and 2012 Summer Olympics.

He was awarded a scholarship to study business administration at Macquarie University in Sydney. He also holds an Associate Degree in Business and Property from International College of Management, Sydney.

He is one of the co-founders of the Australian Conglomerate Panthera Group.

== Social initiatives ==
Chakyl and Martina founded the Panthera Charitable Foundation (PCF) in 2018 after cyclone Idai to support countries which have been affected by natural disasters.

PCF is "supported by a strong team of volunteers both locally and internationally PCF’s project in Mozambique continues to provide villages with the most essential and practical goods to restore normality, whilst keeping these clothes, shoes, books and other items out of landfills, which continue to contribute towards the impact of climate change."
