= Abdulsalam Al Gadabi =

Yemeni swimmer (born 1978)

Personal information
- Nationality: Yemen
- Born: January 1, 1978 (age 48) Sana'a, Yemen

Sport
- Sport: Swimming

Abdulsalam Al-Gadabi (born January 1, 1978, in Sana'a, Yemen) is an Olympic swimmer from Yemen. He swam for Yemen at the 2008 Olympics, where he also swam at the 2007 World Championships in Melbourne.

His personal best for 50 m freestyle is 30.63 (at 2008 Olympics) and he holds the Yemeni Record in the 100 m freestyle with a time 1:05.34.
