= Malaysia at the 2006 Commonwealth Games =

- CG code: MAS
- CGA: Olympic Council of Malaysia
- Website: olympic.org.my

in Melbourne, Australia
- Competitors: 170 in 14 sports
- Officials: 84
- Medals Ranked 8th: Gold 7 Silver 12 Bronze 10 Total 29

Commonwealth Games appearances (overview)
- 1950; 1954; 1958; 1962; 1966; 1970; 1974; 1978; 1982; 1986; 1990; 1994; 1998; 2002; 2006; 2010; 2014; 2018; 2022; 2026; 2030

Other related appearances
- British North Borneo (1958, 1962); Sarawak (1958, 1962)

Malaysia competed in the 2006 Commonwealth Games held in Melbourne, Australia from 15 to 26 March 2006.

== Medal summary ==
=== Medals by sport ===
Sport	Gold	Silver	Bronze	Total	Rank
Badminton	4	3	0	7	1
Diving	0	2	0	2	4
Gymnastics	0	5	2	7	4
Hockey	0	0	1	1	4
Lawn bowls	2	0	0	2	2
Shooting	0	1	4	5	11
Weightlifting	1	1	3	5	4
Total	7	12	10	29	8

=== Multiple medalists ===
Malaysian competitors that have won at least two medals.

Name	Sport	Gold	Silver	Bronze	Total
Chan Chong Ming	Badminton	2			2
Chin Eei Hui	Badminton	2			2
Koo Kien Keat	Badminton	2			2
Lee Chong Wei	Badminton	2			2
Wong Pei Tty	Badminton	2			2
Wong Choong Hann	Badminton	1	2		2
Choong Tan Fook	Badminton	1	1		2
Wong Mew Choo	Badminton	1	1		2
Durratun Nasihin Rosli	Gymnastics		4		4
Wen Chean Lim	Gymnastics		1	2	3
Nur Suryani Taibi	Shooting			2	2

=== Medallists ===
The following Malaysian competitors won medals at the games; all dates are for March 2006.

Medal	Name	Sport	Event	Date
Gold	Lee Chong Wei	Badminton	Men's singles	26
Gold	Chan Chong Ming; Koo Kien Keat	Badminton	Men's doubles	26
Gold	Chin Eei Hui; Wong Pei Tty	Badminton	Women's doubles	26
Gold	Chan Chong Ming; Chin Eei Hui; Choong Tan Fook; Julia Wong Pei Xian; Koo Kien Keat; Lee Chong Wei; Ooi Sock Ai; Wong Choong Hann; Wong Mew Choo; Wong Pei Tty	Badminton	Mixed team	20
Gold	Siti Zalina Ahmad	Lawn bowls	Women's singles	24
Gold	Azlina Arshad; Nor Hashimah Ismail; Nor Iryani Azmi	Lawn bowls	Women's triples	20
Gold	Mohd Faizal Baharom	Weightlifting	Men's 56 kg	16
Silver	Wong Choong Hann	Badminton	Men's singles	26
Silver	Wong Mew Choo	Badminton	Women's singles	26
Silver	Choong Tan Fook; Wong Choong Hann	Badminton	Men's doubles	26
Silver	Yeoh Ken Nee	Diving	Men's 1 metre springboard	22
Silver	Bryan Nickson Lomas; James Sandayud	Diving	Men's synchronized 10 metre platform	24
Silver	Ng Shu Wai	Gymnastics	Men's floor	20
Silver	Durratun Nashihin Rosli	Gymnastics	Women's rhythmic individual all-around	25
Silver	Wen Chean Lim; Durratun Nashihin Rosli; Foong Seow Ting	Gymnastics	Women's rhythmic team all-around	24
Silver	Durratun Nashihin Rosli	Gymnastics	Women's rhythmic rope	26
Silver	Durratun Nashihin Rosli	Gymnastics	Women's rhythmic clubs	26
Silver	Bibiana Ng Pei Chin; Joseline Cheah Lee Yean	Shooting	Women's 10 metre air pistol pairs	19
Silver	Muhamad Hidayat Hamidon	Weightlifting	Men's 69 kg	18
Bronze	Wen Chean Lim	Gymnastics	Women's rhythmic ball	26
Bronze	Wen Chean Lim	Gymnastics	Women's rhythmic ribbon	26
Bronze	Malaysia men's national field hockey team: Azlan Misron; Chua Boon Huat; Ismail Abu; Jivan Mohan; Jiwa Mohan; Keevan Raj Kali; Kuhan Shanmuganathan; Kumar Subramaniam; Logan Raj Kali; Megat Azrafiq Megat Termizi; Mohd Nasihin Ibrahim; Mohd Rodzhanizam Mat Radzi; Mohd Madzli Mohd Nor; Muhamad Amin Rahim; Nor Azlan Bakar; Tengku Ahmad Tajuddin	Hockey	Men's tournament	26
Bronze	Hasli Izwan Amir Hasan	Shooting	Men's 25 metre rapid fire pistol individual	23
Bronze	Nur Suryani Taibi	Shooting	Women's 50 metre rifle prone three position individual	23
Bronze	Nur Suryani Taibi; Nurul Huda Baharin	Shooting	Women's 50 metre rifle prone three position pairs	19
Bronze	Zainal Abidin Md Zain; Zulkeflee Hamsan	Shooting	Open full bore rifle prone Queens prize pairs	19
Bronze	Matin Guntali	Weightlifting	Men's 56 kg	16
Bronze	Roswadi Abdul Rashid	Weightlifting	Men's 62 kg	17
Bronze	Che Mohd Azrul Che Mat	Weightlifting	Men's 105 kg	22

== Athletics ==
Key

- Note–Ranks given for track events are within the athlete's heat only
- Q = Qualified for the next round
- q = Qualified for the next round as a fastest loser or, in field events, by position without achieving the qualifying target
- NR = National record
- N/A = Round not applicable for the event
- Bye = Athlete not required to compete in round

Men
Track and road events

Athlete	Event	Heat		Semifinal		Final	
Athlete	Event	Result	Rank	Result	Rank	Result	Rank
Mohd Hisham Khaironi	100 m T12	11.71	5 Q	11.98	5	Did not advance	
Mohd Robani Hassan	110 m hurdles	13.88 PB	12	—N/a		Did not advance	
Mohd Sharrulhaizy Abdul Rahman	20 km walk	—N/a				DSQ	
Mohd Sharrulhaizy Abdul Rahman	50 km walk	—N/a				5:07:32	7

Field event

Athlete	Event	Qualification		Final	
Athlete	Event	Distance	Position	Distance	Position
Ahmad Najwan Aqra	High jump	2.00	19	Did not advance	

Women
Track events

Athlete	Event	Heat		Semifinal		Final	
Athlete	Event	Result	Rank	Result	Rank	Result	Rank
Moh Siew Wei	100 m hurdles	13.62	9	—N/a		Did not advance	
Noraseela Mohd Khalid	400 m hurdles	57.15	6 Q	—N/a		56.89	6

Field events

Athlete	Event	Qualification		Final	
Athlete	Event	Distance	Position	Distance	Position
Roslinda Samsu	Women's pole vault	4.00	9 q	4.25 PB	4
Law King	Seated shot put EAD	—N/a		434	8

== Badminton ==
Individual

Athlete	Event	Round of 64	Round of 32	Round of 16	Quarterfinals	Semifinals	Final	
Athlete	Event	Opposition Score	Opposition Score	Opposition Score	Opposition Score	Opposition Score	Opposition Score	Rank
Lee Chong Wei (1)	Men's singles	Bye	Dorian Lance James (RSA); W 21-7, 21-6	Philippe Bourret (CAN); W 21-6, 21-4	Anup Sridhar (IND); W 21-15, 21-18	Aamir Ghaffar (ENG); W 21-8, 21-9	Gold medal match Wong Choong Hann (MAS); W 21-13, 21-12	1st place, gold medalist(s)
Wong Choong Hann (2)	Men's singles	Bye	Stuart Brehaut (AUS); W 21-8, 21-5	Andrew Dabeka (CAN); W 21-14, 21-16	Kendrick Lee Yen Hui (SIN); W 21-17, 22-20	Chetan Anand (IND); W 21-11, 17-21, 21-13	Gold medal match Lee Chong Wei (MAS); L 13-21, 12-21	2nd place, silver medalist(s)
Julia Wong Pei Xian	Women's singles	Amrita Sawaram (MRI); W 21-7, 21-8	Aparna Popat (IND); L 13-21, 12-21	Did not advance				
Wong Mew Choo (2)	Women's singles	Bye	Cynthia Denise Course (SEY); W 21-1, 21-3	Solenn Monique Pasturel (JER); W 21-6, 21-11	Xing Aiying (SIN); W 21-10, 21-8	Susan Hughes (SCO); W 21-7, 21-18	Gold medal match Tracey Hallam (ENG); L 12-21, 15-21	2nd place, silver medalist(s)

Doubles

Athlete	Event	Round of 64	Round of 32	Round of 16	Quarterfinals	Semifinals	Final	
Athlete	Event	Opposition Score	Opposition Score	Opposition Score	Opposition Score	Opposition Score	Opposition Score	Rank
Chan Chong Ming; Koo Kien Keat (1)	Men's doubles	—N/a	Bye	Matthew Hughes & Martyn Lewis (WAL); W 21-12, 21-13	Hendri Saputra & Ronald Susilo (SIN); W 21-17, 21-17	Ashley Brehaut & Travis Denney (AUS); W 21-11, 21-8	Gold medal match Choong Tan Fook & Wong Choong Hann (MAS); W 21-13, 21-14	1st place, gold medalist(s)
Choong Tan Fook; Wong Choong Hann	Men's doubles	—N/a	Sanave Thomas & Rupesh Kumar K. T. (IND); W 21-12, 21-17	Mike Beres & William Milroy (CAN); W 21-19, 22-20	Jonathan Neil Morgan & James Alexander Phillips (WAL); W 21-14, 21-9	Anthony Clark & Robert Blair (ENG); W 21-12, 21-11	Gold medal match Chan Chong Ming & Koo Kien Keat (MAS); L 13-21, 14-21	2nd place, silver medalist(s)
Chin Eei Hui; Wong Pei Tty (1)	Women's doubles	—N/a	Bye	Rebecca Bellingham & Rachel Hindley (NZL); W 21-8, 21-19	Michelle Douglas & Yuan Wemyss (SCO); W 21-16, 21-14	Trupti Murgunde & Saina Nehwal (IND); W 21-8, 21-3	Gold medal match Jiang Yanmei & Li Yujia (SIN); W 21-17, 21-19	1st place, gold medalist(s)
Julia Wong Pei Xian; Ooi Sock Ai	Women's doubles	—N/a	Erin Keery & Lisa Lynas (NIR); W 21-8, 21-5	Nicole Gordon & Sara Petersen (NZL); L 20-22, 26-24, 17-21	Did not advance			
Koo Kien Keat; Wong Pei Tty	Mixed doubles	Bye	Charles Pyne & Alya Lewis (JAM); W 21-10, 21-11	Dorian Lance James & Michelle Edwards (RSA); W 21-10, 21-9	Hendra Wijaya & Liu Lan (SIN); W 16-21, 21-11, 21-11	Daniel Shirley & Sara Petersen (NZL); W 21-14, 14-21, 15-21	Gold medal match Hendri Saputra & Li Yujia (SIN); L 14-21, 23-21, 6-21	2nd place, silver medalist(s)
Wong Choong Hann; Ooi Sock Ai	Mixed doubles	Bye	Nathan Robertson & Gail Emms (ENG); L 16-21, 11-21	Did not advance				

Team

Athlete	Event	Group stage		Quarterfinals	Semifinals	Final	
Athlete	Event	Opposition Score	Rank	Opposition Score	Opposition Score	Opposition Score	Rank
Chan Chong Ming; Chin Eei Hui; Choong Tan Fook; Julia Wong Pei Xian; Koo Kien Keat; Lee Chong Wei; Ooi Sock Ai; Wong Choong Hann; Wong Mew Choo; Wong Pei Tty (1)	Mixed team	Fiji; W 5-0; Northern Ireland; W 5-0; Sri Lanka; W 5-0	1 Q	Australia; W 3-0	New Zealand; W 3-1	Gold medal match England; W 3-1	1st place, gold medalist(s)

== Basketball ==
=== Women's tournament ===
Roster

- Goh Beng Fong
- Teo Woon Yuen
- Choo Seck Yun
- Low Bee Chuan
- Yoong Sze Yuin
- Low Meei Fun
- Chow Siao Foong
- Kew Suik May
- Beh Siew Lian
- Thoh Chai Ling
- Pee Yann Yann
- Chew Yong Yong

Group B

Team	Pld	W	L	PF	PA	PD	Pts	Qualification
New Zealand	3	3	0	313	156	+157	6	Qualified for the semifinals
Nigeria	3	2	1	236	194	+42	5	Qualified for the semifinals
Malaysia	3	1	2	242	275	−33	4	
Malta	3	0	3	156	281	−125	3	

March 17
18:00

Malaysia	67–97	Nigeria
Scoring by quarter: 18-17, 21-27, 15-24, 13-29

Bendigo Stadium, Bendigo

March 19
18:00

New Zealand	113–56	Malaysia
Scoring by quarter: 26-14, 29-14, 33-12, 25-16

Bendigo Stadium, Bendigo

March 20
18:00

Malaysia	68–65	Malta
Scoring by quarter: 11-17, 13–15, 24-18, 20-15

Ballarat Minerdome, Ballarat

Fifth to eighth place classification

March 21
18:00

Mozambique	80–70	Malaysia
Scoring by quarter: 22-14, 27-10, 13-27, 18-19

Geelong Arena, Geelong

Seventh and eighth place match

March 22
11:30

Malta	59–63	Malaysia
Scoring by quarter: 14-11, 12-19, 21-14, 12-19

Melbourne Multi Purpose Venue, Melbourne

Ranked 7th in final standings

== Boxing ==
Men

Athlete	Event	Round of 32	Round of 16	Quarterfinals	Semifinals	Final	
Athlete	Event	Opposition Result	Opposition Result	Opposition Result	Opposition Result	Opposition Result	Rank
Zamzai Azizi Mohamad	Light flyweight (48 kg)	Bye	Emmanuel Romesh Fernando (AUS); W 28–13	Darran Langley (ENG); L 23–26	Did not advance		
Eddey Kalai	Featherweight (57 kg)	Bye	Danladi Yakubu (NGR); W RSCOS	Darren Edwards (WAL); L 14–36	Did not advance		
Paunandes Paulus	Lightweight (60 kg)	Levan Stewart (BAH); W 25–13	Asghar Ali Shah (PAK); L 11–25	Did not advance			

== Cycling ==
=== Road ===
Athlete	Event	Time Speed (km/h)	Rank
Anuar Manan	Men's road race	DNF	
Mohd Jasmin Ruslan	Men's road race	DNF	
Mohd Sayuti Mohd Zahit	Men's road race	DNF	
Muhammad Fauzan Ahmad Lutfi	Men's road race	DNF	
Shahrulneeza Razali	Men's road race	DNF	
Suhardi Hassan	Men's road race	DNF	
Muhammad Fauzan Ahmad Lutfi	Men's road time trial	58:28.90; 41.039	36
Shahrulneeza Razali	Men's road time trial	56:29.20; 42.488	28
Noor Azian Alias	Women's road race	3:00.09; 33.362	20
Norizan Musa	Women's road race	3:11.50; 31.330	29
Noor Azian Alias	Women's road time trial	43:10.73	12
Uracca Leow Hoay Sim	Women's road time trial	43:25.44	13

=== Track ===
Sprint

Athlete	Event	Qualification		1/8 finals	1/8 repechage	Quarterfinals	Semifinals	Final	
Athlete	Event	Time Speed (km/h)	Rank	Opposition Time	Opposition Time	Opposition Time	Opposition Time	Opposition Time	Rank
Josiah Ng	Men's sprint	10.744; 67.014	9 Q	R Lynch (JAM); W	Bye	T Smith (CAN); L	Bye	5th – 8th classification J Grace (NZL); M Librizzi (SCO); L	6
Mohamad Hafiz Sufian	Men's sprint	10.908; 66.006	12 Q	R Edgar (SCO); L	R Lynch (JAM); M R Tisin (MAS); L	Did not advance			
Mohd Rizal Tisin	Men's sprint	10.699; 67.296	7 Q	M Librizzi (SCO); L	R Lynch (JAM); M H Sufian (MAS); L	Did not advance			
Josiah Ng; Junaidi Mohamad Nasir; Mohd Rizal Tisin	Men's team sprint	46.578; 57.967	6	—N/a				Did not advance	

Pursuit

Athlete	Event	Qualification		Final	
Athlete	Event	Time Speed (km/h)	Rank	Opposition Time	Rank
Amiruddin Jamaludin	Men's individual pursuit	4:49.106; 49.808	14	Did not advance	
Muhammad Fauzan Ahmad Lutfi	Men's individual pursuit	4:46.271; 50.301	13	Did not advance	
Amiruddin Jamaludin; Mohd Sayuti Mohd Zahit; Muhammad Fauzan Ahmad Lutfi; Thum Weng Kim	Men's team pursuit	4:24.496; 54.443	14	Did not advance	
Noor Azian Alias	Women's individual pursuit	4:05.107; 44.062	10	Did not advance	
Uracca Leow Hoay Sim	Women's individual pursuit	3:59.430; 45.107	9	Did not advance	

Time trial

Athlete	Event	Time Speed (km/h)	Rank
Mohamad Hafiz Sufian	Men's 1 km time trial	1:06.011; 54.536	7

Points race

Athlete	Event	Qualification		Final	
Athlete	Event	Points	Rank	Points	Rank
Mohd Jasmin Ruslan	Men's points race	30	2	-20	20
Noor Azian Alias	Women's points race	—N/a		0	14
Uracca Leow Hoay Sim	Women's points race	—N/a		1	13

Scratch race

Athlete	Event	Qualification		Final	
Athlete	Event	Time	Rank	Time	Rank
Mohd Sayuti Mohd Zahit	Men's team pursuit		4 Q		12
Muhammad Fauzan Ahmad Lutfi	Men's team pursuit		11 Q		15
Thum Weng Kim	Men's team pursuit		12 Q		14

Keirin

Athlete	Event	Round 1		Repechage 1		Semifinals		Final	
Athlete	Event	Opposition Time	Rank	Opposition Time	Rank	Opposition Time	Rank	Opposition Time	Rank
Josiah Ng	Men's keirin	R Bayley (AUS); J Staff (ENG); J Forde (BAR); L	3 R	T Smith (CAN); J Cumberbatch (BAR); Adam Stewart (NZL); L	2 Q	S Kelly (AUS); B Kersten (AUS); Mohd Rizal Tisin (MAS); J Staff (ENG); N Seddon (NZL); L	2 Q	1st – 6th classification R Bayley (AUS); T Smith (CAN); R Edgar (SCO); S Kelly (AUS); B Kersten (AUS); W	5
Mohd Rizal Tisin	Men's keirin	S Kelly (AUS); R Edgar (SCO); J Grace (NZL); T Smith (CAN); L	5 R	N Seddon (NZL); J Grace (NZL); J Forde (BAR); L	3 Q	S Kelly (AUS); J Ng O L (MAS); B Kersten (AUS); J Staff (ENG); N Seddon (NZL); L	4 R	7th – 12th classification J Grace (NZL); J Cumberbatch (BAR); R Lynch (JAM); N Seddon (NZL); J Staff (ENG); L	11

== Diving ==
Men

Athlete	Event	Preliminaries		Final		Total points	Rank
Athlete	Event	Points	Rank	Points	Rank	Total points	Rank
Khairul Safwan Mansur	1 m springboard	312.55	10 Q	305.55	9	618.10	9
Yeoh Ken Nee	1 m springboard	421.05	2 Q	423.90	2	844.95	2nd place, silver medalist(s)
Khairul Safwan Mansur	3 m springboard	291.30	10 Q	365.40	7	656.70	8
Yeoh Ken Nee	3 m springboard	455.65	1 Q	115.50	11	571.15	11
Bryan Nickson Lomas	10 m platform	430.60	6 Q	451.65	6	882.25	6
Bryan Nickson Lomas; James Sandayud	10 m synchronized platform	—N/a		427.44	2	427.44	2nd place, silver medalist(s)

Women

Athlete	Event	Preliminaries		Final		Total points	Rank
Athlete	Event	Points	Rank	Points	Rank	Total points	Rank
Leong Mun Yee	1 m springboard	257.95	6 Q	266.85	4	524.80	6
Cheong Jun Hoong	3 m springboard	256.55	12 Q	245.10	11	501.65	12
Leong Mun Yee	3 m springboard	133.60	15	Did not advance			
Cheong Jun Hoong; Leong Mun Yee	3 m synchronized springboard	—N/a		243.90	6	243.90	6

== Gymnastics ==
=== Artistic ===
Men

Athlete	Event								
Athlete	Event	F Rank	PH Rank	R Rank	V Rank	PB Rank	HB Rank	Total	Rank
Ng Shu Mun	Qualification	13.650; 21	—N/a	13.250; 21	15.750; 18	13.500; 16	14.100; 13	70.250	30
Ng Shu Wai	Qualification	14.700; 6 Q	14.100; 6 Q	13.200; 24	16.100; 5 Q	13.750; 14	14.600; 5 Q	86.450	5 Q
Onn Kwang Tung	Qualification	—N/a	12.450; 24	—N/a			13.050; 24	25.500	48
Ooi Wei Siang	Qualification	13.700; 20	13.200; 17	13.050; 25	16.200; 3 Q	12.750; 33	14.100; 14	83.000	12 Q
Yap Kiam Bun	Qualification	13.400; 24	13.300; 16	12.650; 29	15.600; 25	13.100; 26	—N/a	68.050	32
Ng Shu Mun; Ng Shu Wai; Mohd Ismail; Onn Kwang Tung; Ooi Wei Siang; Yap Kiam Bun	Team all-around	42.050; 4	40.600; 4	39.500; 6	48.050; 3	40.350; 5	42.800; 3	253.350	5
Ng Shu Wai	Individual all-around	14.700; 1	13.200; 8	13.850; 10	16.100; 2	14.600; 6	14.600; 6	87.050	5
Ooi Wei Siang	Individual all-around	13.200; 16	11.350; 21	14.200; 5	16.100; 2	13.000; 15	14.350; 7	82.200	13
Ng Shu Wai	Floor	14.850; 2	—N/a					14.850	2nd place, silver medalist(s)
Ng Shu Wai	Pommel horse	—N/a	12.950; 7	—N/a				12.950	7
Ng Shu Wai	Vault	—N/a			15.575; 5	—N/a		15.575	5
Ooi Wei Siang	Vault	—N/a			15.225; 8	—N/a		15.225	8
Ng Shu Wai	Horizontal bar	—N/a					14.700; 4	14.700	4

Women

Athlete	Event						
Athlete	Event	F Rank	V Rank	UB Rank	BB Rank	Total	Rank
Nabihah Ali	Qualification	11.750; 28	12.500; 36	10.000; 35	12.250; 26	46.500	26 Q
Nurul Fatiha Abdul Hamid	Qualification	12.650; 19	12.750; 33	12.000; 26	11.950; 31	49.350	22 Q
Tan Kai Ling	Qualification	12.200; 22	12.400; 38	10.050; 33	11.450; 35	46.100	27
Nabihah Ali; Nurul Fatiha Abdul Hamid; Tan Kai Ling	Team all-around	36.600; 7	37.650; 9	32.050; 9	35.650; 9	141.950	8
Nabihah Ali	Individual all-around	12.450; 18	12.900; 21	11.300; 21	11.550; 20	47.600	16
Nurul Fatiha Abdul Hamid	Individual all-around	12.800; 15	13.250; 18	11.350; 20	10.650; 23	47.500	17

=== Rhythmic ===
Athlete	Event						
Athlete	Event	Rope Rank	Ball Rank	Clubs Rank	Ribbon Rank	Total	Rank
Wen Chean Lim	Qualification	12.050; 4 Q	12.650; 4 Q	12.600; 6	11.975; 3 Q	49.275	4 Q
Durratun Nasihin Rosli	Qualification	13.075; 2 Q	12.075; 7 Q	13.300; 2 Q	11.100; 7 Q	49.550	3 Q
Foong Seow Ting	Qualification	11.675; 9	11.775; 9	13.000; 4 Q	10.975; 8	47.425	7
Wen Chean Lim; Durratun Nasihin Rosli; Foong Seow Ting	Team all-around	36.800; 2	36.500; 2	38.900; 1	34.050; 2	124.175	2nd place, silver medalist(s)
Wen Chean Lim	Individual all-around	10.975; 9	10.375; 13	12.900; 3	11.975; 3	46.225	7
Durratun Nasihin Rosli	Individual all-around	13.275; 2	12.925; 2	12.950; 2	11.675; 4	50.825	2nd place, silver medalist(s)
Wen Chean Lim	Individual rope	12.375; 4	—N/a			12.375	4
Durratun Nasihin Rosli	Individual rope	13.250; 2	—N/a			13.250	2nd place, silver medalist(s)
Wen Chean Lim	Individual ball	—N/a	13.225; 3	—N/a		13.225	3rd place, bronze medalist(s)
Durratun Nasihin Rosli	Individual ball	—N/a	13.150; 4	—N/a		13.150	4
Durratun Nasihin Rosli	Individual clubs	—N/a		13.475; 2	—N/a	13.475	2nd place, silver medalist(s)
Foong Seow Ting	Individual clubs	—N/a		12.275; 7	—N/a	12.275	7
Wen Chean Lim	Individual ribbon	—N/a			12.350; 3	12.350	3rd place, bronze medalist(s)
Durratun Nasihin Rosli	Individual ribbon	—N/a			12.200; 4	12.200	4

== Hockey ==
=== Men's tournament ===
Roster

- Mohd Nasihin Ibrahim (GK)
- Muhamad Amin Rahim
- Chua Boon Huat
- Logan Raj Kali
- Kuhan Shanmuganathan
- Nor Azlan Bakar
- Megat Azrafiq
- Jiwa Mohan
- Mohd Madzli Mohd Nor
- Tengku Ahmad Tajuddin
- Mohd Rodzhanizam Mat Radzi
- Keevan Raj Kali
- Ismail Abu
- Azlan Misron
- Jivan Mohan
- Kumar Subramaniam (GK)

Pool B

17 March 2006
08:30

India	1 – 1	Malaysia

Umpires:
Gerald Curran (SCO)
Simon Taylor (NZL)
David Gentles (AUS)

18 March 2006
18:30

Trinidad and Tobago	0 – 8	Malaysia

Umpires:
Nicholas Lockhart (ENG)
Simon Taylor (NZL)
David Gentles (AUS)

21 March 2006
08:30

Malaysia	2 – 1	South Africa

Umpires:
Nicholas Lockhart (ENG)
Simon Taylor (NZL)
Paul Ludwig (AUS)

22 March 2006
13:00

Pakistan	6 – 5	Malaysia

Umpires:
Gerald Curran (SCO)
Gary Minogue Simmonds (RSA)
David Gentles (AUS)

Semifinal

24 March 2006
11:00

Australia	6 – 0	Malaysia

Umpires:
Gerald Curran (SCO)
Colin Hutchinson (IRL)
Nathan Stagno (GIB)

Bronze medal match

26 March 2006
10:30

Australia	2 – 0	England

Umpires:
Simon Taylor (NZL)
David Gentles (AUS)
Paul Ludwig (AUS)

Ranked 3rd in final standings

=== Women's tournament ===
Roster

- Fauziah Mizan (GK)
- Intan Ahmad
- Sebah Kari
- Noor Hasliza Md Ali
- Siti Noor Amarina Ruhani
- Juliani Mohamad Din
- Norfaraha Hashim
- Siti Rahmah Othman
- Chitra Devi Arumugam
- Kannagi Arumugam
- Nadia Abdul Rahman
- Norbaini Hashim
- Ernawati Mahmud (GK)
- Catherine Lambor
- Siti Sarah Ismail
- Nurul Shahizan Rahmat

Pool A

Pos	Team	Pld	W	D	L	GF	GA	GD	Pts	Qualification
1	Australia	4	4	0	0	27	2	+25	12	Semi-finals
2	India	4	2	1	1	18	7	+11	7	Semi-finals
3	Malaysia	4	2	0	2	7	15	−8	6	
4	South Africa	4	1	1	2	7	8	−1	4	
5	Nigeria	4	0	0	4	1	28	−27	0	

Source: The CGF
Rules for classification: 1) points; 2) goal difference; 3) goals scored; 4) head-to-head result.

16 March 2006
13:00

Malaysia	0 – 4	Nigeria

Umpires:
Julie Ashton Lucy (AUS)
Anne McRae (SCO)
Tracy Wrigley (NZL)

17 March 2006
21:00

Australia	8 – 0	Malaysia

Umpires:
Sarah Garnett (NZL)
Corrine Cornelius (RSA)
Renate Peters (GER)

20 March 2006
08:30

Malaysia	2 – 1	South Africa

Umpires:
Minka Woolley (AUS)
Anne McRae (SCO)
Wendy Stewart (CAN)

21 March 2006
21:00

Malaysia	2 – 1	India

Umpires:
Sarah Garnett (NZL)
Anne McRae (SCO)
Corrine Cornelius (RSA)

Fifth and sixth place match

23 March 2006
13:30

Malaysia	0 – 3	Scotland

Umpires:
Alison Hill (ENG)
Corrine Cornelius (RSA)
Tracy Wrigley (NZL)

Ranked 6th in final standings

== Lawn bowls ==
Men

Athlete	Event	Group stage		Quarterfinal	Semifinal	Final	
Athlete	Event	Opposition Score	Rank	Opposition Score	Opposition Score	Opposition Score	Rank
Mohd Affendy Tan Abdullah	Singles	Peter Juni (PNG); W 11–4, 8–4; Kelvin Kerkow (AUS); L 6–11, 10–4, 0–2; Ieremia Leautuli (SAM); W 7–12, 9–4, 2–1; Martin McHugh (NIR); L 7–7, 6–8; Douw Calitz (NAM); L 1–14, 5–7	4	Did not advance		13th – 16th classification Shaun Parnis (MLT); L 6–8, 7–9; Matthew Len le Ber (GUE); W 14–4, 11–5; Naim Brahim (BRU); W 9–3, 9–3	13
Fairul Izwan Abd Muin; Safuan Said	Pairs	Malawi; W 12–2, 16–2; Namibia; W 7–5, 10–9; New Zealand; W 9–6, 12–4; Australia; L 6–14, 10–7, 1–2	2 Q	Scotland; L 8–7, 7–8, 0–2	Did not advance		6
Azwan Shuhaimi; Megat Mohammad Nazim Zainuddin; Syed Mohamad Syed Akil	Triples	Cook Islands; L 13–6, 3–8, 1–2; Samoa; W 9–7, 18–1; Brunei; L 5–6, 8–8; Papua New Guinea; W 13–3, 5–8, 2–0; Guernsey; W 14–2, 15–3	2 Q	England; L 6–11 3–10	Did not advance		6

Women

Athlete	Event	Group stage		Quarterfinal	Semifinal	Final	
Athlete	Event	Opposition Score	Rank	Opposition Score	Opposition Score	Opposition Score	Rank
Siti Zalina Ahmad	Singles	Elizabeth Spence James (SWZ); W 6–11, 11–2, 2–1; Zelda Humphreys (MAW); L 16–3, 2–14, 1–2; Maureen Burns (KEN); W 10–5, 7–8, 2–1; Ellen Falkner (ENG); W 8–5, 11–2	2 Q	Alison Jayne Merrien (GUE); W 6–10, 12–6, 2–0	Margaret Johnston (NIR); W 11–2, 8–4	Gold medal match Elizabeth Morgan (WAL); W 10–5, 9–5	1st place, gold medalist(s)
Chui Mei Bah; Haslah Hassan	Pairs	England; W 8–5, 12–5; Scotland; L 11–5, 6–13, 0–2; Canada; W 8–5, 11–6; Australia; L 9–10, 4–8; South Africa; L 7–8, 7–8; Swaziland; L 1–12, 5–7; Norfolk Island; W 7–8, 10–4, 2–0; Zambia; W 8–6, 7–6	5	Did not advance		9th – 10th classification Shaun Parnis (COK); L 6–8, 6–6	10
Azlina Arshad; Nor Hashimah Ismail; Nor Iryani Azmi	Triples	Wales; L 5–8, 9–4, 0–2; England; W 3–16, 10–5, 2–0; Fiji; W 7–7, 11–3; Niue; W 10–8, 15–4; South Africa; L 5–6, 8–6, 0–2; Scotland; W 12–5, 7–7	3 Q	New Zealand; W 7–9, 12–5, 2–1	Jersey; W 12–5, 16–3	Gold medal match Australia; W 12–12, 13–4	1st place, gold medalist(s)

== Shooting ==
Men
Pistol/Small bore

Athlete	Event	Qualification		Final	
Athlete	Event	Points	Rank	Points	Rank
Hasli Izwan Amir Hasan	25 m centre fire pistol individual	—N/a		572	5
Hasli Izwan Amir Hasan	25 m rapid fire pistol individual	573	3 Q	770.4	3rd place, bronze medalist(s)
Azlan Johari	10 m air rifle individual	583	13	Did not advance	
Mohamed Hameleay Abdul Mutalib	10 m air rifle individual	583	14	Did not advance	
Azlan Johari; Mohamed Hameleay Abdul Mutalib	10 m air rifle pairs	—N/a		1170	5
Azlan Johari	50 m rifle prone individual	584	22	Did not advance	
Mohamed Hameleay Abdul Mutalib	50 m rifle prone individual	584	19	Did not advance	
Azlan Johari; Mohamed Hameleay Abdul Mutalib	50 m rifle prone pairs	—N/a		1163	11
Azlan Johari	50 m rifle three positions individual	1118	16	Did not advance	
Mohamed Hameleay Abdul Mutalib	50 m rifle three positions individual	1137	7 Q	1233.2	6
Azlan Johari; Mohamed Hameleay Abdul Mutalib	50 m rifle three positions pairs	—N/a		2254	5

Shotgun

Athlete	Event	Qualification		Final	
Athlete	Event	Points	Rank	Points	Rank
Richard Cheong Yew Kwan	Skeet individual	111	18	Did not advance	
Ricky Teh Chee Fei	Skeet individual	117	7	Did not advance	
Richard Cheong Yew Kwan; Ricky Teh Chee Fei	Skeet pairs	—N/a		170	9
Bernard Yeoh Cheng Han	Trap individual	112	17	Did not advance	
Chen Seong Fook	Trap individual	101	29	Did not advance	
Bernard Yeoh Cheng Han; Chen Seong Fook	Trap pairs	—N/a		167	12
Khor Seng Chye	Double trap individual	125	14	Did not advance	
Tan Tian Xiang	Double trap individual	116	18	Did not advance	
Khor Seng Chye; Tan Tian Xiang	Double trap pairs	—N/a		151	8

Full bore

Athlete	Event	Stage 1			Stage 2			Stage 3		Total score	Rank
Athlete	Event	300x	500x	600x	300x	500x	600x	900x	1000x	Total score	Rank
Zainal Abidin Md Zain	Full bore rifle Queen's prize open individual	35.05	35.04	34.03	50.05	49.09	49.07	74.13	75.05	401.51	4
Zulkeflee Hamsan	Full bore rifle Queen's prize open individual	34.04	35.04	34.03	50.07	49.05	50.06	75.10	74.10	401.49	5
Zainal Abidin Md Zain	Full bore rifle Queen's prize open pairs	—N/a			50.06	50.09	50.09	75.10	72.08	592.72	3rd place, bronze medalist(s)
Zulkeflee Hamsan	Full bore rifle Queen's prize open pairs	—N/a			49.04	49.05	50.05	74.08	73.08	592.72	3rd place, bronze medalist(s)

Women
Pistol/Small bore

Athlete	Event	Qualification		Final	
Athlete	Event	Points	Rank	Points	Rank
Bibiana Ng Pei Chin	10 m air pistol individual	374	9	Did not advance	
Joseline Cheah Lee Yean	10 m air pistol individual	374	7 Q	470.3	4
Bibiana Ng Pei Chin; Joseline Cheah Lee Yean	10 m air pistol pairs	—N/a		758	2nd place, silver medalist(s)
Bibiana Ng Pei Chin	25 m sport pistol individual	571	5 Q	767.2	5
Joseline Cheah Lee Yean	25 m sport pistol individual	546	15	Did not advance	
Bibiana Ng Pei Chin; Joseline Cheah Lee Yean	25 m sport pistol pairs	—N/a		1116	4
Muslifah Zulkifli	10 m air rifle individual	390	11	Did not advance	
Nur Suryani Taibi	10 m air rifle individual	388	14	Did not advance	
Muslifah Zulkifli; Nur Suryani Taibi	10 m air rifle pairs	—N/a		774	6
Mariani Mohamad	50 m rifle prone individual	—N/a		576	11
Nur Suryani Taibi	50 m rifle prone individual	—N/a		580	5
Mariani Mohamad; Nur Suryani Taibi	50 m rifle prone pairs	—N/a		1142	10
Nur Suryani Taibi	50 m rifle three positions individual	576	1 Q	668.0	3rd place, bronze medalist(s)
Nurul Huda Baharin	50 m rifle three positions individual	567	8 Q	665.3	6
Nur Suryani Taibi; Nurul Huda Baharin	50 m rifle three positions pairs	—N/a		1140	3rd place, bronze medalist(s)

== Squash ==
Individual

Athlete	Event	Round of 64	Round of 32	Round of 16	Quarterfinals	Semifinals	Final	Rank
Athlete	Event	Opposition Score	Opposition Score	Opposition Score	Opposition Score	Opposition Score	Opposition Score	Rank
Mohd Azlan Iskandar	Men's singles	Bye	C Binnie (JAM); W 9–0, 9–1, 9–1	G Ryding (CAN); L 10–9, 1–9, 0–9, 5–9	Did not advance			
Ong Beng Hee	Men's singles	Bye	S Delierre (CAN); W 9–3, 9–1, 9–2	N Matthew (ENG); L 4–9, 2–9, 7–9	Did not advance			
Nicol David (1)	Women's singles	—N/a	Bye	R Reta (CAN); W 9–0, 9–0, 9–3	T Bailey (ENG); W 9–6, 10–9, 9–3	N Grinham (AUS); L 10–9, 7–9, 9–4, 6–9, 3–9	Bronze medal match S Kitchen (NZL); L 9–5, 6–9, 5–9, 2–9	4
Sharon Wee	Women's singles	—N/a	N Fernandes (GUY); W 4–9, 9–6, 7–9, 9–6, 9–2	M Perry (NIR); L 9–6, 3–9, 5–9, 9–6, 5–9	Did not advance			
Tricia Chuah	Women's singles	—N/a	V Florens (MRI); W 9–3, 9–0, 9–5	N Grinham (AUS); L 9–7, 5–9, 3–9, 0–9	Did not advance			

Doubles

Athletes	Event	Group stage				Round of 16	Quarterfinal	Semifinal	Final	Rank
Athletes	Event	Opposition Score	Opposition Score	Opposition Score	Rank	Opposition Score	Opposition Score	Opposition Score	Opposition Score	Rank
Ong Beng Hee; Nicol David	Mixed doubles	S Badrinath & N Fernandes (GUY); W W/O	D J Gray & R Nobbs (NFI); W 9–0, 9–3, 9–0	C van der Wath & D Argyle (RSA); W 9–7, 12–10, 9–5	1 Q	G Jones & T Malik (WAL); L 7–9, 9–5, 7–9, 8–10	Did not advance			

== Swimming ==
Men

Athlete	Event	Heat		Semifinal		Final	
Athlete	Event	Time	Rank	Time	Rank	Time	Rank
Dawan Fraidden	50 m freestyle EAD	31.42	17	—N/a		Did not advance	
Razak Tambi	50 m freestyle EAD	30.32	14	—N/a		Did not advance	
Stanley Jaranding	50 m freestyle EAD	29.03	11	—N/a		Did not advance	
Daniel Bego	100 m freestyle	52.45	19	Did not advance			
Dawan Fraidden	100 m freestyle EAD	14.17	14	—N/a		Did not advance	
Razak Tambi	100 m freestyle EAD	15.80	15	—N/a		Did not advance	
Stanley Jaranding	100 m freestyle EAD	DSQ		—N/a		Did not advance	
Daniel Bego	200 m freestyle	1:52.45	17	—N/a		Did not advance	
Alex Lim	50 m backstroke	26.49	9 Q	25.71	5 Q	25.77	5
Alex Lim	100 m backstroke	57.61	11 Q	56.55	10	Did not advance	
Daniel Bego	50 m butterfly	27.01	30	Did not advance			
Daniel Bego	100 m butterfly	55.81	13 Q	55.49	12	Did not advance	

Women

Athlete	Event	Heat		Semifinal		Final	
Athlete	Event	Time	Rank	Time	Rank	Time	Rank
Chui Lai Kwan	50 m freestyle	27.07	13 Q	27.12	15	Did not advance	
Chui Lai Kwan	100 m freestyle	1:01.07	29	Did not advance			
Ong Ming Xiu	200 m freestyle	2:07.99	19	—N/a		Did not advance	
Ong Ming Xiu	400 m freestyle	4:27.20	13	—N/a		Did not advance	
Ong Ming Xiu	800 m freestyle	9:09.11	11	—N/a		Did not advance	
Chui Lai Kwan	50 m backstroke	31.32	13	Did not advance			
Chui Lai Kwan	100 m backstroke	1:07.25	15 Q	1:06.48	15	Did not advance	

== Synchronized swimming ==
Athlete	Event	Technical routine		Free routine		Total points	Rank
Athlete	Event	Score	Rank	Score	Rank	Total points	Rank
Shareen Png Hui Chuen	Women's solo	39.000	6	39.500	6	78.500	6
Shareen Png Hui Chuen; Zyanne Lee Zhien Huey	Women's duet	38.750	5	39.167	5	77.917	5

== Table tennis ==
Singles

Athletes	Event	Preliminary round		Round of 64	Round of 32	Round of 16	Quarterfinal	Semifinal	Final	Rank
Athletes	Event	Opposition Score	Rank	Opposition Score	Opposition Score	Opposition Score	Opposition Score	Opposition Score	Opposition Score	Rank
Chan Koon Wah	Men's singles	A Rasheed (MDV); W 4–0; G Sultan (SEY); W 4–0	1 Q	J Ho (SIN); L 1–4	Did not advance					
Chong Chit Sheng	Men's singles	T Maleko (TUV); W 4–0; K Razzaq (PAK); L 2–4	2	Did not advance						
Kho Mao Sheng	Men's singles	A Hubbard (NZL); L 2–4; K Farley (BAR); L 0–4	3	Did not advance						
Muhd Shakirin Ibrahim	Men's singles	A Ringui (KEN); W 4–0; D Strachan (JAM); W 4–3	1 Q	Bye	S Toriola (NGR); L 0–4	Did not advance				
Beh Lee Wei	Women's singles	Bye		—N/a	G Ogundele (NGR); W 4–0	S Sang (AUS); L 1–4	Did not advance			
Chiu Soo Jiin	Women's singles	J Esparon (SEY); W 4–0; B Daunton (WAL); W 4–0	1 Q	—N/a	Xu H G (CAN); W 4–1	S Tan P F (SIN); L 1–4	Did not advance			
Fan Xiao Jun	Women's singles	I Manikku Badu (SRI); W 4–3; G Walker (ENG); L 1–4	2	—N/a	Did not advance					
Ng Sock Khim	Women's singles	F Nimal (MDV); W 4–0; S Shu (NZL); W 4–0	1 Q	—N/a	O Oshunaike (NGR); W 4–2	Zhang XL (SIN); L 1–4	Did not advance			
Chang Chen Yen	Women's singles EAD	R Chesang (KEN); W 3–0; F Obiora (NGR); L 0–3; S Gilroy (ENG); L 0–3; J Boyd (AUS); L 0–3	4	—N/a			Did not advance			
Pua Gin Chu	Women's singles EAD	J Wallis (AUS); W 3–0; C Harris (WAL); L 0–3; J W Kamande (KEN); W 3–1; R Riese (RSA); L 1–3	3	—N/a			Did not advance			

Doubles

Athletes	Event	Round of 64	Round of 32	Round of 16	Quarterfinal	Semifinal	Final	Rank
Athletes	Event	Opposition Score	Opposition Score	Opposition Score	Opposition Score	Opposition Score	Opposition Score	Rank
Chan Koon Wah; Muhd Shakirin Ibrahim	Men's doubles	Bye	P L Hinse & S Qiang (CAN); L 2–3	Did not advance				
Chong Chit Sheng; Kho Mao Sheng	Men's doubles	A Rasheed & I Shahid (MDV); W 3–0	A Hubbard & P Jackson (NZL); L 1–3	Did not advance				
Beh Lee Wei; Ng Sock Khim	Women's doubles	—N/a	Hung C W & S Shu (NZL); W 3–0	N Saha & S Kumaresan (IND); W 3–0	Lay J F & Miao M (AUS); L 1–3	Did not advance		
Chiu Soo Jiin; Fan Xiao Jun	Women's doubles	—N/a	A Lulu & P Tommy (VAN); W 3–1	Li JW & Zhang XL (SIN); L 1–3	Did not advance			
Chan Koon Wah; Ng Sock Khim	Mixed doubles	D Zalcberg & S Sang (AUS); W 3–0	R Jenkins & B Daunton (WAL); W 3–1	S Kamal & P Ghatak (IND); W 3–2	Yang Z & Zhang XL (SIN); L 0–3	Did not advance		
Chong Chit Sheng; Chiu Soo Jiin	Mixed doubles	K M Evans & A Lukaaya (UGA); W W/O	S Roy & M Das (IND); L 0–3	Did not advance				
Kho Mao Sheng; Fan Xiao Jun	Mixed doubles	W Nyirenda & M Chirwa (MAW); W 3–0	S Toriola & O Oshunaike (NGR); L 0–3	Did not advance				
Muhd Shakirin Ibrahim; Beh Lee Wei	Mixed doubles	F Kassam & Zhang M (CAN); W 3–2		B Clarke & Lay Jian Fang (NZL); W 3–0	J Ho & S Tan P F (SIN); L 2–3	Did not advance		

Team

Athletes	Event	Preliminary round		Quarterfinal	Semifinal	Final	Rank
Athletes	Event	Opposition Score	Rank	Opposition Score	Opposition Score	Opposition Score	Rank
Chan Koon Wah; Chong Chit Sheng; Kho Sheng Mao; Muhd Shakirin Ibrahim	Men's team	Vanuatu; W 3–0; Mauritius; W 3–0; Maldives; W 3–0; Nigeria; L 0–3; South Africa; W 3–0; New Zealand; W 3–1	2 Q	Wales; L 1–3	Did not advance	5th – 8th classification Australia; L 0–3; 7th – 8th classification Canada; L 0–3	8
Beh Lee Wei; Chiu Soo Jiin; Fan Xiao Jun; Ng Sock Khim	Women's team	Mauritius; W 3–0; Fiji; W 3–0; India; W 3–0; Wales; W 3–0	1 Q	Canada; L 1–3	Did not advance	5th – 8th classification New Zealand; W 3–2; 5th – 6th classification Nigeria; W 3–1	5

== Triathlon ==
Women

Athlete	Event	Swim (1.5 km) Rank	Bike (40 km) Rank	Run (10 km) Rank	Total time	Rank
Kimberley Yap Fui Li	Individual	20:04.67; 21	1:14:41.89; 24	42:43.12; 22	2:17:29.68	22

== Weightlifting ==
Men

Athlete	Event	Snatch		Clean & jerk		Total	Rank
Athlete	Event	Result	Rank	Result	Rank	Total	Rank
Mohd Faizal Baharom	56 kg	115	1	140	1	255	1st place, gold medalist(s)
Matin Guntali	56 kg	107	3	131	2	238	3rd place, bronze medalist(s)
Naharudin Mahayudin	62 kg	116	5	141	5	257	5
Roswadi Abdul Rashid	62 kg	120	2	141	5	261	3rd place, bronze medalist(s)
Muhamad Hidayat Hamidon	69 kg	130	1	163	2	293	2nd place, silver medalist(s)
Che Mohd Azrul Che Mat	105 kg	148	4	182	3	330	3rd place, bronze medalist(s)

Women

Athlete	Event	Snatch		Clean & jerk		Total	Rank
Athlete	Event	Result	Rank	Result	Rank	Total	Rank
Zaira Zakaria	48 kg	65	4	80	5	145	5
Nurul Farhanah Johari	63 kg	80	4	95	4	175	4

Powerlifting

Athlete	Event	Result	Rank
Koh Chia Chern	Open bench press	159.1	8
Mariappan Perumal	Open bench press	–	DNF
