= Cycling at the 2006 Commonwealth Games – Men's sprint =

The Men's individual sprint at the 2006 Commonwealth Games took place on March 18, 2006 at the Vodafone Arena.

== Qualification ==
Seeding is decided by a 200 metre time trial.

Rank	Rider	Time	Average Speed (km/h)
1	Ross Edgar (SCO)	10.294	69.943
2	Matthew Crampton (ENG)	10.307	69.855
3	Ryan Bayley (AUS)	10.407	69.184
4	Ricardo Lynch (JAM)	10.451	68.892
5	Travis Smith (CAN)	10.452	68.886
6	Marco Librizzi (SCO)	10.656	67.567
7	Mohd Rizal Tisin (MAS)	10.699	67.296
8	Shane Perkins (AUS)	10.703	67.270
9	Josiah Ng (MAS)	10.744	67.014
10	Justin Grace (NZL)	10.789	66.734
11	Nathan Seddon (NZL)	10.843	66.402
12	Mohamad Hafiz Sufian (MAS)	10.908	66.006
13	Cameron Mackinnon (CAN)	11.023	65.317
14	Adam Stewart (NZL)	11.069	65.046
15	John Cumberbatch (BAR)	11.173	64.441
16	Jason Forde (BAR)	11.456	62.849
17	Percival Epeli Navolo (FIJ)	13.529	53.219
18	Vinesh Lal (FIJ)	14.636	49.193
19	Rakeshwar Lal (FIJ)	14.815	48.599

== Results ==
=== 1/8 Finals ===
Heat	Rank	Rider	Time	Avg speed (km/h)	Notes
1	1	Ross Edgar (SCO)	11.279	63.835	Q
1	2	Mohamad Hafiz Sufian (MAS)			R
2	1	Matthew Crampton (ENG)	10.865	66.267	Q
2	2	Nathan Seddon (NZL)			R
3	1	Ryan Bayley (AUS)	11.069	65.046	Q
3	2	Justin Grace (NZL)			R
4	1	Josiah Ng (MAS)	10.895	66.085	Q
4	2	Ricardo Lynch (JAM)			R
5	1	Travis Smith (CAN)	11.283	63.812	Q
5	2	Shane Perkins (AUS)			R
6	1	Marco Librizzi (SCO)	11.568	62.240	Q
6	2	Mohd Rizal Tisin (MAS)			R

=== 1/8 Finals Repechage ===
Heat	Rank	Rider	Time	Avg speed (km/h)	Notes
1	1	Ricardo Lynch (JAM)	11.457	62.843	Q
1	2	Mohd Rizal Tisin (MAS)			
1	3	Mohamad Hafiz Sufian (MAS)	DQ		
2	1	Justin Grace (NZL)	10.960	65.693	Q
2	2	Shane Perkins (AUS)			
2	3	Nathan Seddon (NZL)			

=== Quarter-finals ===
Heat	Rank	Rider	Race 1	Race 2	Race 3	Notes
1	1	Ross Edgar (SCO)	11.096	11.100		Q
1	2	Justin Grace (NZL)				
2	1	Matthew Crampton (ENG)	10.876	?		Q
2	2	Ricardo Lynch (JAM)		DQ		
3	1	Ryan Bayley (AUS)	11.094	10.922		Q
3	2	Marco Librizzi (SCO)				
4	1	Travis Smith (CAN)	11.107	11.277		Q
4	2	Josiah Ng (MAS)				

=== Race for 5th-8th Places ===
Rank	Rider	Time	Avg speed (km/h)
5	Justin Grace (NZL)	11.439	62.942
6	Josiah Ng (MAS)		
7	Marco Librizzi (SCO)		
8	Ricardo Lynch (JAM)		

=== Semi-finals ===
Heat	Rank	Rider	Race 1	Race 2	Race 3	Notes
1	1	Ross Edgar (SCO)	11.369		10.906	Q
1	2	Travis Smith (CAN)		10.999		
2	1	Ryan Bayley (AUS)	10.771	11.104		Q
2	2	Matthew Crampton (ENG)				

=== Finals ===
Rank	Rider	Race 1	Race 2	Race 3
Bronze medal final
3rd place, bronze medalist(s)	Travis Smith (CAN)	11.346	10.932	
4	Matthew Crampton (ENG)			
Gold medal final
1st place, gold medalist(s)	Ryan Bayley (AUS)	11.273	10.639	
2nd place, silver medalist(s)	Ross Edgar (SCO)			
