= Cycling at the 2006 Commonwealth Games – Men's keirin =

The Men's keirin at the 2006 Commonwealth Games in Melbourne, Australia took place on March 17, 2006 at the Melbourne Multi Purpose Venue.

The gold medal was won by Ryan Bayley of Australia.

== Results ==
=== First round ===
==== Heat 1 ====
Rank	Rider
1	Ryan Bayley (AUS)
2	Jamie Staff (ENG)
3	Josiah Ng (MAS)
4	Jason Forde (BAR)
5	Adam Stewart (NZL)

==== Heat 2 ====
Rank	Rider
1	Shane Kelly (AUS)
2	Ross Edgar (SCO)
3	Justin Grace (NZL)
4	Travis Smith (CAN)
5	Mohd Rizal Tisin (MAS)

==== Heat 3 ====
Rank	Rider
1	Ben Kersten (AUS)
2	Ricardo Lynch (JAM)
3	Nathan Seddon (NZL)
4	John Cumberbatch (BAR)
5	Matthew Crampton (ENG)

=== Repechages ===
==== Heat 1 ====
Rank	Rider
1	Travis Smith (CAN)
2	Josiah Ng (MAS)
3	John Cumberbatch (BAR)
4	Adam Stewart (NZL)

==== Heat 2 ====
Rank	Rider
1	Nathan Seddon (NZL)
2	Justin Grace (NZL)
3	Mohd Rizal Tisin (MAS)
4	Jason Forde (BAR)

=== Second round ===
==== Heat 1 ====
Rank	Rider
1	Ryan Bayley (AUS)
2	Travis Smith (CAN)
3	Ross Edgar (SCO)
4	Justin Grace (NZL)
5	Ricardo Lynch (JAM)
6	John Cumberbatch (BAR)

==== Heat 2 ====
Rank	Rider
1	Shane Kelly (AUS)
2	Josiah Ng (MAS)
3	Ben Kersten (AUS)
4	Mohd Rizal Tisin (MAS)
5	Jamie Staff (ENG)
6	Nathan Seddon (NZL)

=== Finals ===
==== 1st to 6th ====
Rank	Rider
1st place, gold medalist(s)	Ryan Bayley (AUS)
2nd place, silver medalist(s)	Travis Smith (CAN)
3rd place, bronze medalist(s)	Ross Edgar (SCO)
4	Shane Kelly (AUS)
5	Josiah Ng (MAS)
REL	Ben Kersten (AUS)

==== 7th to 12th ====
Rank	Rider
7	Justin Grace (NZL)
8	John Cumberbatch (BAR)
9	Ricardo Lynch (JAM)
10	Nathan Seddon (ENG)
11	Mohd Rizal Tisin (MAS)
12	Jamie Staff (ENG)
