= Diving at the 2006 Commonwealth Games – Women's 3 metre springboard =

Women's 3 metre springboard at the 2006 Commonwealth Games
- Venue: Melbourne Sports and Aquatic Centre
- Date: 25 March
- Competitors: 15 from 8 nations
- Winning score: 690.05

Medalists
gold medal	Blythe Hartley	Canada
silver medal	Chantelle Newbery	Australia
bronze medal	Kathryn Blackshaw	Australia

The women's 3 metre springboard was part of the Diving at the 2006 Commonwealth Games program. The competition was held on 25 March 2006 at Melbourne Sports and Aquatic Centre in Melbourne, Australia.

== Format ==
The competition was held in two rounds:

- Preliminary round: All 15 divers perform six dives, and the top 12 proceed to the final.
- Final: The 12 divers perform six dives; these are added onto the preliminary round scores and the top three divers win the gold, silver and bronze medals accordingly.

== Schedule ==
All times are Australian Eastern Daylight Time (UTC+11).

Date	Start	Round
25 March	10:00	Preliminary
25 March	19:00	Finals

== Results ==
Results:

Green denotes finalists

Rank	Diver	Preliminary		Final		Total Points
Rank	Diver	Points	Rank	Points	Rank	Total Points
1st place, gold medalist(s)	Blythe Hartley (CAN)	330.90	1	359.15	1	690.05
2nd place, silver medalist(s)	Chantelle Newbery (AUS)	325.15	2	356.15	2	681.30
3rd place, bronze medalist(s)	Kathryn Blackshaw (AUS)	304.40	4	324.60	3	629.00
4	Megan Farrow (GUY)	298.90	5	311.25	4	610.15
5	Sharleen Stratton (AUS)	282.55	8	324.25	5	606.80
6	Melanie Rinaldi (CAN)	291.80	6	314.30	6	606.10
7	Emilie Heymans (CAN)	287.40	7	300.40	7	587.80
8	Hayley Sage (ENG)	274.15	9	304.55	8	578.70
9	Jenna Dreyer (RSA)	272.40	10	272.10	9	544.50
10	Tandi Indergaard (ENG)	266.05	11	274.05	10	540.10
11	Rebecca Gallantree (ENG)	316.10	3	222.15	11	538.25
12	Cheong Jun Hoong (MAS)	256.55	12	245.10	12	501.65
13	Katura Horton-Perinchief (BER)	248.65	13	did not advance		
14	Tharaki Siyaguna (SRI)	149.60	14	did not advance		
15	Leong Mun Yee (MAS)	133.60	15	did not advance		
