= Diving at the 2006 Commonwealth Games – Men's 10 metre platform =

Men's 10 metre platform at the 2006 Commonwealth Games
- Venue: Melbourne Sports and Aquatic Centre
- Date: 25 March
- Competitors: 10 from 4 nations
- Winning score: 1085.60

Medalists
| gold medal | Matthew Helm | Australia |
| silver medal | Peter Waterfield | England |
| bronze medal | Alexandre Despatie | Canada |

The men's 10 metre platform was part of the Diving at the 2006 Commonwealth Games program. The competition was held on 22 March 2006 at Melbourne Sports and Aquatic Centre in Melbourne, Australia.

== Format ==
The competition was held in two rounds:

- Preliminary round: All 10 divers perform six dives, and as there are only 10 competitors, they all advance to the final.
- Final: The 10 divers perform six dives; these are added onto the preliminary round scores and the top three divers win the gold, silver and bronze medals accordingly.

== Schedule ==
All times are Australian Eastern Daylight Time (UTC+11).

| Date | Start | Round |
|---|---|---|
| 25 March | 11:27 | Preliminary |
| 25 March | 20:31 | Finals |

== Results ==
Results:

| Rank | Diver | Preliminary | | Final | | Total Points |
| Rank | Diver | Points | Rank | Points | Rank | Total Points |
|---|---|---|---|---|---|---|
| 1st place, gold medalist(s) | Matthew Helm (AUS) | 532.20 | 2 | 553.40 | 1 | 1085.60 |
| 2nd place, silver medalist(s) | Peter Waterfield (ENG) | 530.15 | 3 | 500.35 | 2 | 1030.50 |
| 3rd place, bronze medalist(s) | Alexandre Despatie (CAN) | 532.90 | 1 | 484.05 | 3 | 1016.95 |
| 4 | Robert Newbery (AUS) | 466.40 | 5 | 524.05 | 4 | 990.45 |
| 5 | Matthew Mitcham (AUS) | 492.05 | 4 | 472.05 | 5 | 964.10 |
| 6 | Bryan Nickson (MAS) | 430.60 | 6 | 451.65 | 6 | 882.25 |
| 7 | Gareth Jones (ENG) | 420.90 | 7 | 427.05 | 7 | 847.95 |
| 8 | Wegadesk Gorup-Paule (CAN) | 419.30 | 8 | 369.10 | 8 | 788.40 |
| 9 | Kevin Geyson (CAN) | 398.05 | 9 | 366.25 | 9 | 764.30 |
| 10 | Callum Johnstone (ENG) | 350.30 | 10 | 408.25 | 10 | 758.55 |
