= Diving at the 2006 Commonwealth Games – Men's synchronized 10 metre platform =

Men's synchronized 10 metre platform at the 2006 Commonwealth Games
- Venue: Melbourne Sports and Aquatic Centre
- Date: 24 March
- Competitors: 8 from 4 nations
- Winning sore: 440.58

Medalists
gold medal	Matthew Helm; Robert Newbery	Australia
silver medal	Bryan Nickson Lomas; James Sandayud	Malaysia
bronze medal	Gary Hunt; Callum Johnstone	England

The men's synchronized 10 metre platform was part of the Diving at the 2006 Commonwealth Games program. The competition was held on 24 March 2006 at Melbourne Sports and Aquatic Centre in Melbourne, Australia.

== Format ==
A single round was held, with each team making six dives. Eleven judges scored each dive: three for each diver, and five for synchronisation. Only the middle score counted for each diver, with the middle three counting for synchronisation. These five scores were averaged, multiplied by 3, and multiplied by the dive's degree of difficulty to give a total dive score. The scores for each of the five dives were summed to give a final score.

== Schedule ==
All times are Australian Eastern Daylight Time (UTC+11).

Date	Start	Round
24 March	11:23	Finals

== Results ==
Results:

Rank	Nation	Total
1st place, gold medalist(s)	Australia; Matthew Helm; Robert Newbery	440.58
2nd place, silver medalist(s)	Malaysia; Bryan Nickson Lomas; James Sandayud	427.44
3rd place, bronze medalist(s)	England; Gary Hunt; Callum Johnstone	404.82
4	Canada; Riley McCormick; Wegadesk Gorup-Paule	396.18
