= Diving at the 2006 Commonwealth Games – Women's synchronized 3 metre springboard =

2006 Commonwealth Games Diving Event

Women's synchronized 3 metre springboard at the 2006 Commonwealth Games
- Venue: Melbourne Sports and Aquatic Centre
- Date: 22 March
- Competitors: 12 from 4 nations
- Winning sore: 296.07

Medalists
gold medal	Bree Cole; Sharleen Stratton	Australia
silver medal	Melanie Rinaldi; Rebecca Barras	Canada
bronze medal	Tandi Indergaard; Hayley Sage	England

The women's synchronized 3 metre springboard was part of the Diving at the 2006 Commonwealth Games program. The competition was held on 22 March 2006 at Melbourne Sports and Aquatic Centre in Melbourne, Australia.

== Format ==
A single round was held, with each team making six dives. Eleven judges scored each dive: three for each diver, and five for synchronisation. Only the middle score counted for each diver, with the middle three counting for synchronisation. These five scores were averaged, multiplied by 3, and multiplied by the dive's degree of difficulty to give a total dive score. The scores for each of the five dives were summed to give a final score.

== Schedule ==
All times are Australian Eastern Daylight Time (UTC+11).

Date	Start	Round
22 March	11:26	Finals

== Results ==
Results:

Rank	Nation	Total
1st place, gold medalist(s)	Australia - Australia 1 Bree Cole; Sharleen Stratton	296.07
2nd place, silver medalist(s)	Canada - Canada 1 Melanie Rinaldi; Rebecca Barras	273.72
3rd place, bronze medalist(s)	England - England 2 Tandi Indergaard; Hayley Sage	270.63
4	Australia - Australia 2 Kathryn Blackshaw; Chantelle Newbery	248.64
5	England - England 1 Claire Blencowe; Katherine Hamilton	248.25
6	Malaysia - Malaysia; Cheong Jun Hoong; Leong Mun Yee	243.90
