= Diving at the 2006 Commonwealth Games – Women's synchronised 10 metre platform =

Women's synchronized 10 metre platform at the 2006 Commonwealth Games
- Venue: Melbourne Sports and Aquatic Centre
- Date: 22 March
- Competitors: 10 from 3 nations
- Winning sore: 317.58

Medalists
gold medal	Chantelle Newbery; Loudy Tourky	Australia
silver medal	Alexandra Croak; Melissa Wu	Australia
bronze medal	Meaghan Benfeito; Roseline Filion	Canada

The women's synchronized 10 metre platform was part of the Diving at the 2006 Commonwealth Games program. The competition was held on 22 March 2006 at Melbourne Sports and Aquatic Centre in Melbourne, Australia.

== Format ==
A single round was held, with each team making six dives. Eleven judges scored each dive: three for each diver, and five for synchronisation. Only the middle score counted for each diver, with the middle three counting for synchronisation. These five scores were averaged, multiplied by 3, and multiplied by the dive's degree of difficulty to give a total dive score. The scores for each of the five dives were summed to give a final score.

== Schedule ==
All times are Australian Eastern Daylight Time (UTC+11).

Date	Start	Round
22 March	20:44	Finals

== Results ==
Results:

Rank	Nation	Total
1st place, gold medalist(s)	Australia - Australia 2 Chantelle Newbery; Loudy Tourky	317.58
2nd place, silver medalist(s)	Australia - Australia 1 Alexandra Croak; Melissa Wu	309.90
3rd place, bronze medalist(s)	Canada - Canada; Meaghan Benfeito; Roseline Filion	303.15
4	England - England 2 Tonia Couch; Stacie Powell	290.46
5	England - England 1 Sarah Barrow; Brooke Graddon	275.91
