= Diving at the 2006 Commonwealth Games – Women's 1 metre springboard =

Women's 1 metre springboard at the 2006 Commonwealth Games
- Venue: Melbourne Sports and Aquatic Centre
- Date: 24 March
- Competitors: 13 from 8 nations
- Winning score: 644.65

Medalists
gold medal	Blythe Hartley	Canada
silver medal	Sharleen Stratton	Australia
bronze medal	Kathryn Blackshaw	Australia

The women's 1 metre springboard was part of the Diving at the 2006 Commonwealth Games program. The competition was held on 24 March 2006 at Melbourne Sports and Aquatic Centre in Melbourne, Australia.

== Format ==
The competition was held in two rounds:

- Preliminary round: All 13 divers perform six dives, and the top 12 proceed to the final.
- Final: The 12 divers perform six dives; these are added onto the preliminary round scores and the top three divers win the gold, silver and bronze medals accordingly.

== Schedule ==
All times are Australian Eastern Daylight Time (UTC+11).

Date	Start	Round
24 March	10:00	Preliminary
24 March	19:00	Finals

== Results ==
Results:

Green denotes finalists

Rank	Diver	Preliminary		Final		Total points
Rank	Diver	Points	Rank	Points	Rank	Total points
1st place, gold medalist(s)	Blythe Hartley (CAN)	316.15	1	328.50	1	644.65
2nd place, silver medalist(s)	Sharleen Stratton (AUS)	297.65	2	298.80	2	596.45
3rd place, bronze medalist(s)	Kathryn Blackshaw (AUS)	267.95	5	276.45	3	544.40
4	Jenna Dreyer (RSA)	274.25	3	264.15	4	538.40
5	Megan Farrow (GUY)	268.40	4	257.35	5	525.75
6	Leong Mun Yee (MAS)	257.95	6	266.85	6	524.80
7	Tandi Indergaard (ENG)	254.50	7	263.50	7	518.00
8	Melanie Rinaldi (CAN)	252.10	8	258.45	8	510.55
9	Claire Blencowe (ENG)	227.75	10	230.15	9	457.90
10	Rachel Kemp (CAN)	236.45	9	220.10	10	456.55
11	Katura Horton-Perinchief (BER)	220.05	11	233.10	11	453.15
12	Katie Hamilton (ENG)	203.45	12	DNS		
13	Tharaki Siyaguna (SRI)	114.40	13	Did not advance		
