= Cycling at the 2006 Commonwealth Games – Men's 1 km time trial =

The Men's 1 km time trial at the 2006 Commonwealth Games was contested at the Melbourne Multi Purpose Venue on March 16, 2006.

== Results ==
| Rank | Rider | Time | Average Speed (km/h) |
|---|---|---|---|
| 1st place, gold medalist(s) | Ben Kersten (AUS) | 1:01.815 | 58.238 |
| 2nd place, silver medalist(s) | Jason Queally (ENG) | 1:01.849 | 58.206 |
| 3rd place, bronze medalist(s) | Chris Hoy (SCO) | 1:02.071 | 57.998 |
| 4 | Craig MacLean (SCO) | 1:02.983 | 57.158 |
| 5 | Hayden Godfrey (NZL) | 1:03.919 | 56.321 |
| 6 | Cameron Mackinnon (CAN) | 1:05.374 | 55.067 |
| 7 | Mohamad Hafiz Sufian (MAS) | 1:06.011 | 54.536 |
| 8 | Yannik Morin (CAN) | 1:07.621 | 53.237 |
| 9 | Percival Epeli Navolo (FIJ) | 1:23.766 | 42.976 |
| 10 | Vinesh Lal (FIJ) | 1:28.113 | 40.856 |
| 11 | Rakeshwar Lal (FIJ) | 1:29.337 | 40.296 |
