= Diving at the 2006 Commonwealth Games – Men's 1 metre springboard =

Men's 1 metre springboard at the 2006 Commonwealth Games
- Venue: Melbourne Sports and Aquatic Centre
- Date: 22 March
- Competitors: 12 from 5 nations
- Winning score: 853.50

Medalists
gold medal	Alexandre Despatie	Canada
silver medal	Yeoh Ken Nee	Malaysia
bronze medal	Steven Barnett	Australia

The men's 1 metre springboard was part of the Diving at the 2006 Commonwealth Games program. The competition was held on 22 March 2006 at Melbourne Sports and Aquatic Centre in Melbourne, Australia.

== Format ==
The competition was held in two rounds:

- Preliminary round: All 12 divers perform six dives, and as there are only 12 competitors, they all advance to the final.
- Final: The 12 divers perform six dives; these are added onto the preliminary round scores and the top three divers win the gold, silver and bronze medals accordingly.

== Schedule ==
All times are Australian Eastern Daylight Time (UTC+11).

Date	Start	Round
22 March	10:00	Preliminary
22 March	19:00	Finals

== Results ==
Results:

Rank	Diver	Preliminary		Final		Total Points
Rank	Diver	Points	Rank	Points	Rank	Total Points
1st place, gold medalist(s)	Alexandre Despatie (CAN)	425.15	1	428.35	1	853.50
2nd place, silver medalist(s)	Yeoh Ken Nee (MAS)	421.05	2	423.90	2	844.95
3rd place, bronze medalist(s)	Steven Barnett (AUS)	377.10	3	400.75	3	777.85
4	Peter Waterfield (ENG)	369.35	4	382.45	4	751.80
5	Matthew Mitcham (AUS)	357.95	5	369.20	5	727.15
6	Benjamin Swain (ENG)	357.70	6	353.65	6	711.35
7	Scott Robertson (AUS)	338.35	7	351.30	7	689.65
8	Arturo Miranda (CAN)	332.05	8	356.50	8	688.55
9	Safwan Khairul (MAS)	312.55	10	305.55	9	618.10
10	Gareth Jones (ENG)	317.55	9	289.95	10	607.50
11	Cameron McLean (CAN)	258.90	11	262.45	11	521.35
12	Esiri Kankanige (SRI)	156.85	12	143.95	12	300.80
