= Cycling at the 2006 Commonwealth Games – Men's team pursuit =

The Men's team pursuit at the 2006 Commonwealth Games took place on March 18, 2006 at the Vodafone Arena in Melbourne, Australia.

== Qualification ==
Rank	Country	Cyclists	Result
1	England	Steve Cummings; Rob Hayles; Paul Manning; Chris Newton	4:05.248
2	Australia	Matthew Goss; Ashley Hutchinson; Stephen Wooldridge; Mark Jamieson	4:06.522
3	New Zealand	Jason Allen; Hayden Godfrey; Timothy Gudsell; Marc Ryan	4:07.307
4	Malaysia	Amirrudin Jamaludin; Mohd Sayuti Mohd Zahit; Muhammad Fauzan Ahmad Lufti; Weng Kim Thum	4:24.496
5	South Africa	Garth Conrad Thomas; Jeremy Paul Maartens; Rupert Rheeder; Durwan Benjamin	4:29.364

== Finals ==
Bronze medal race

Rank	Country	Cyclists	Result
3rd place, bronze medalist(s)	New Zealand	Hayden Godfrey; Timothy Gudsell; Marc Ryan; Peter Lathan	
4	Malaysia	Amirrudin Jamaludin; Mohd Sayuti Mohd Zahit; Muhammad Fauzan Ahmad Lufti; Weng Kim Thum	OVL

Gold medal race

Rank	Country	Cyclists	Result
1st place, gold medalist(s)	England	Steve Cummings; Rob Hayles; Paul Manning; Chris Newton	4:02.699
2nd place, silver medalist(s)	Australia	Ashley Hutchinson; Matthew Goss; Mark Jamieson; Stephen Wooldridge	4:05.494
