= Test of Metal =

The Test of Metal is a 67-kilometre cross-country mountain bike race that was held annually in and around Squamish, British Columbia until the final race in 2016. The demanding course, with over 1,200 metres of climbing and 35 kilometres of singletrack, takes just under three hours for the fastest riders and between four and five hours for the majority of competitors. The number of entries allowed is limited (in 2006 to 800). The race is part of the Test of Metal Mountain Bike Festival, a weekend of mountain biking, trials, and related events.

Past Winners
Year	Top Male	Top Female
1995	Carter Hovey	Sally Carmichael
1996	Michael Pruner	Erin McGann
1997	Geoff Kabush	Linda Robichaud
1998	Chad Miles	Kiara Bisaro
1999	Chad Miles	Kiara Bisaro
2000	Ruedi Shnyder	Sandra Walter
2001	Carter Hovey	Eron Chorney
2002	Andrew Kyle	Lesley Tomlinson
2003	Carter Hovey	Sarah Noble
2004	Ricky Federau	Alison Sydor
2005	Neal Kindree	Meghan Kindree
2006	Neal Kindree	Catharine Pendrel
2007	Neal Kindree	Catharine Pendrel
2008	Max Plaxton	Wendy Simms
2009	Max Plaxton	
