= Cycling at the 2006 Commonwealth Games – Women's road time trial =

Cycling – Women's road time trial at the 2006 Commonwealth Games
- Venue: St Kilda Foreshore and Beach Road
- Location: Melbourne, Australia
- Date: 21 March 2006
- Competitors: 14
- Winning time: 37:40.87

Medalists
gold medal	Oenone Wood	Australia
silver medal	Kathy Watt	Australia
bronze medal	Sara Carrigan	Australia

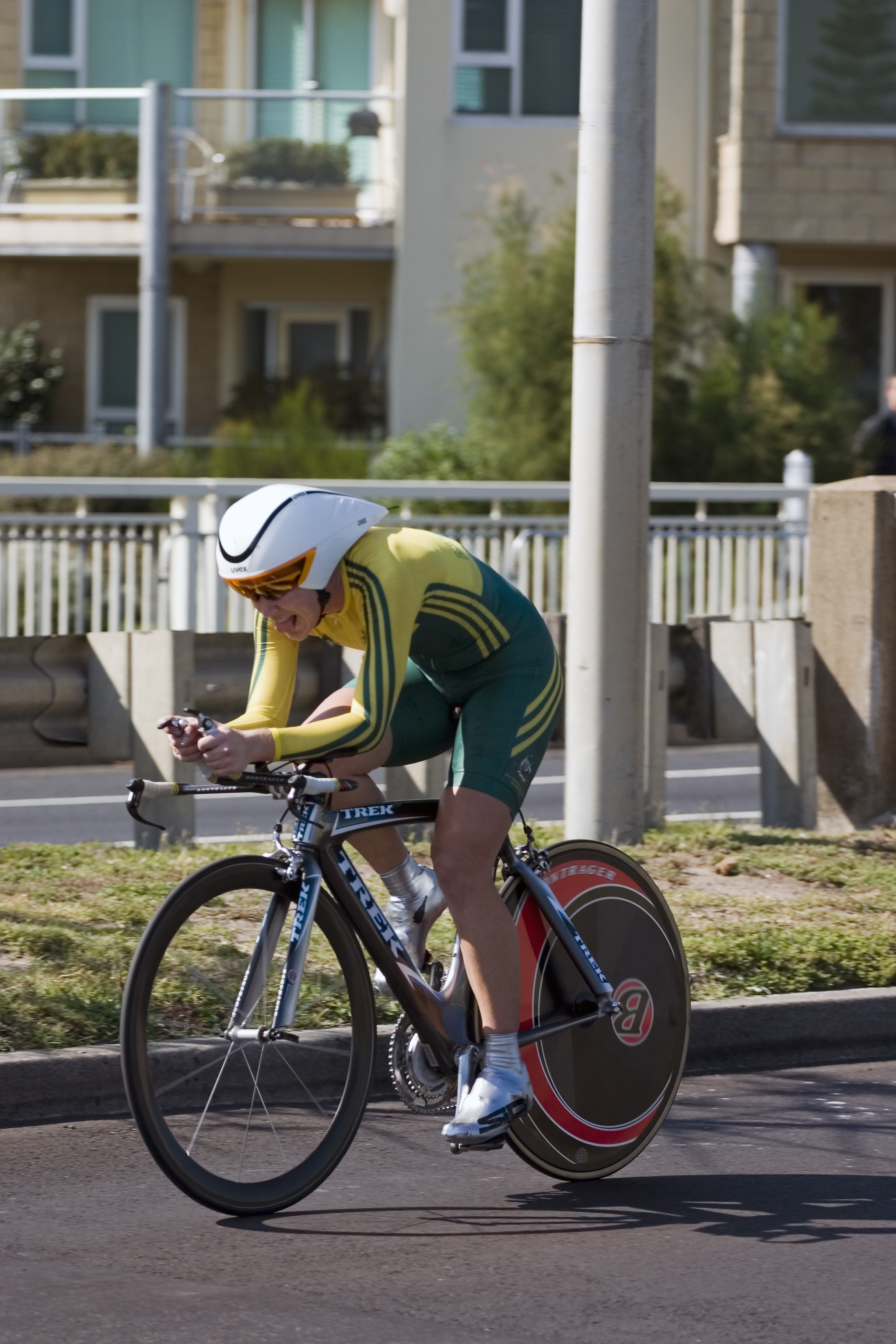
Sara Carrigan on the way to a bronze medal

The women's cycling road time trial was one of the road cycling events at the 2006 Commonwealth Games and was held on 21 March on a 29 km course on the St Kilda Foreshore and Beach Road.

== Results ==
Rank	Rider	Time
1st place, gold medalist(s)	Oenone Wood (AUS)	37:40.87
2nd place, silver medalist(s)	Kathy Watt (AUS)	37:56.07
3rd place, bronze medalist(s)	Sara Carrigan (AUS)	38:00.32
4	Melissa Holt (NZL)	39:02.53
5	Rachel Heal (ENG)	39:26.37
6	Wendy Houvenaghel (ENG)	39:46.02
7	Alison Shanks (NZL)	40:17.25
8	Susan Janne Palmer-Komar (CAN)	40:32.60
9	Katrina Hair (SCO)	40:46.17
10	Erinne Willock (CAN)	41:39.79
11	Julia Lesley Hawley (BER)	42:58.67
12	Noor Azian Binti Alias (MAS)	43:10.73
13	Leow Hoay Sim (MAS)	43:25.44
14	Stephania Magri (MLT)	45:59.26
	Iona Parks (JAM)	DNS
	Sarah Ulmer (NZL)	DNS
