= Aquatics at the 2006 Commonwealth Games =

- Venue: Melbourne Sports and Aquatic Centre
- Location: Melbourne, Australia
- Dates: 16–25 March 2006

Aquatics at the 2006 Commonwealth Games was the 18th appearances of both Swimming at the Commonwealth Games and Diving at the Commonwealth Games and the sixth appearance of Synchronised swimming at the Commonwealth Games.

The events were held at the Melbourne Sports and Aquatic Centre (MSAC) and featured 54 disciplines: ten in Diving, 42 in Swimming and two in Synchronised swimming.

Australia topped the aquatics (all events) medal table with 30 gold medals, the same number that they won four years earlier.

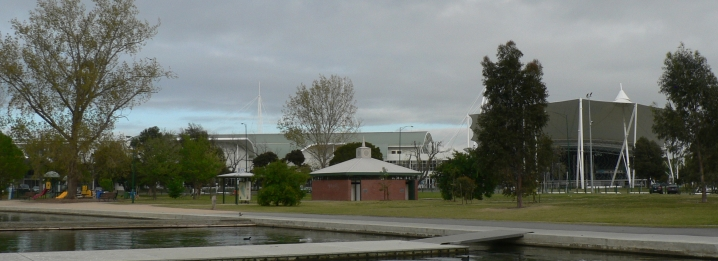
The Melbourne Sports and Aquatic Centre from Albert Park Lake in 2006

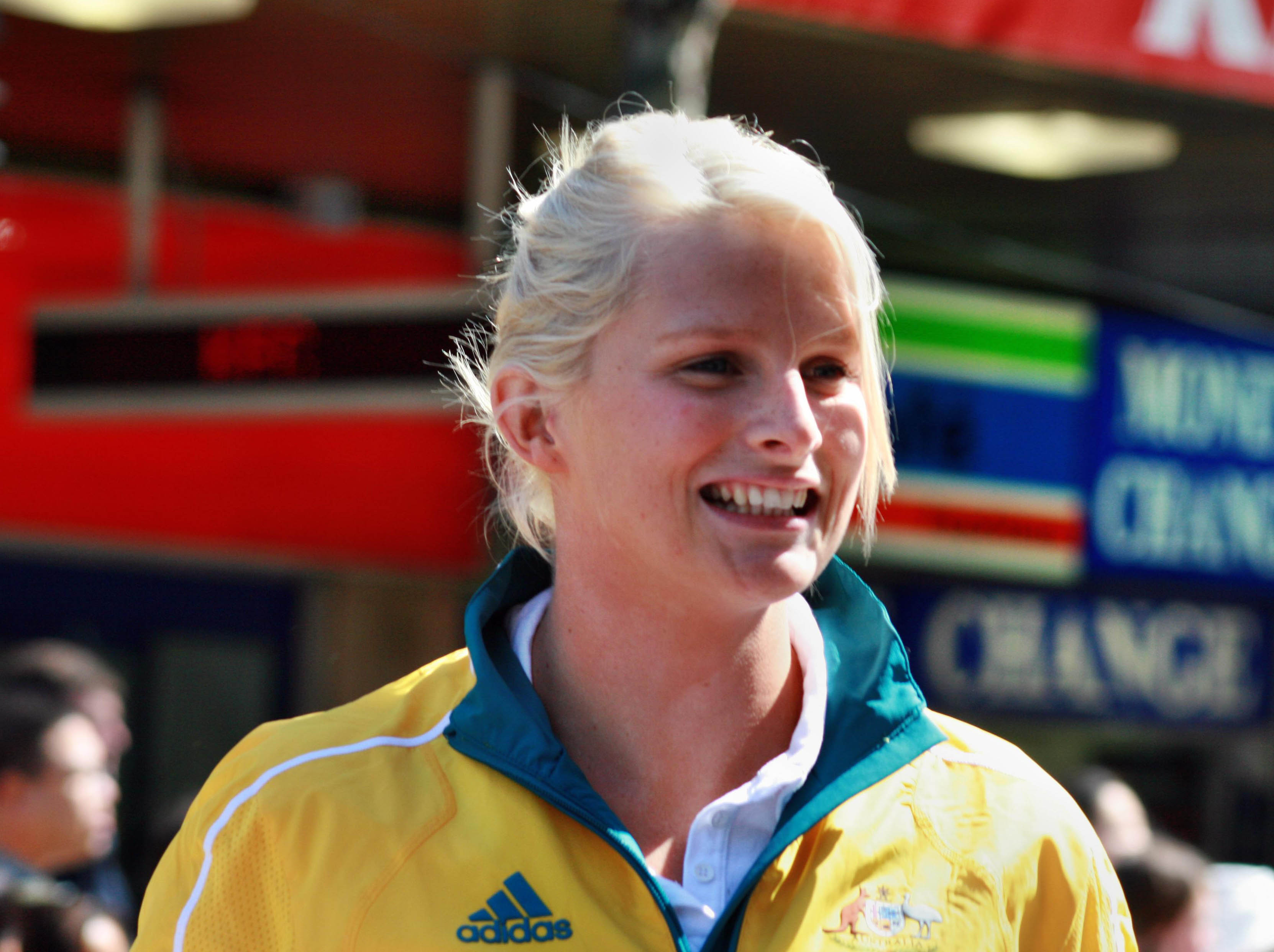
Leisel Jones won four gold medals, sweeping the breaststroke events and the medley relay.

== Medal table (all aquatic sports) ==
Rank	Nation	Gold	Silver	Bronze	Total
1	Australia*	30	24	23	77
2	England	8	14	5	27
3	Canada	8	8	11	27
4	Scotland	6	3	3	12
5	South Africa	5	2	5	12
6	New Zealand	1	1	5	7
7	Wales	1	0	2	3
8	Papua New Guinea	1	0	0	1
9	Malaysia	0	2	0	2
Totals (9 entries)		60	54	54	168
