= Richard O'Malley =

Richard O'Malley may refer to:

- Richard O'Malley, character in Prisoners (2013 film)
- Richard O'Malley (rugby union), see Canada at the 2006 Commonwealth Games
