= Stephen Wooldridge =

Australian cyclist

Personal information
- Full name: Stephen Brian Wooldridge
- Born: 17 October 1977 Sydney, Australia
- Died: 14 August 2017 (aged 39)

Cycling career
- Sport: Cycling
- Disciplines: Road and track
- Role: Rider

Amateur teams
- 2004–2005: ComNet-Senges
- 2006–2007: SouthAustralia.com–AIS
Medal record
Representing Australia
Men's track cycling
Olympic Games
Gold medal – first place	2004 Athens	Team Pursuit
Commonwealth Games
Gold medal – first place	2002 Manchester	Team Pursuit
Silver medal – second place	2006 Melbourne	Team pursuit
World Championships
Gold medal – first place	2002 Copenhagen	Team pursuit
Gold medal – first place	2003 Stuttgart	Team pursuit
Gold medal – first place	2004 Melbourne	Team pursuit
Gold medal – first place	2006 Bordeaux	Team pursuit
Bronze medal – third place	2005 Los Angeles	Team pursuit

Stephen Brian Wooldridge OAM (17 October 1977 – 14 August 2017) was an Australian racing cyclist, an Olympic and four-time world champion on the track. He was born in Sydney. He was an Australian Institute of Sport scholarship holder.

In 2005, Wooldridge was awarded a Medal of the Order of Australia for service to sport as a gold medallist at the 2004 Summer Olympics in Athens. He was inducted into the NSW Hall of Champions in 2015.

Wooldridge committed suicide on 14 August 2017 at the age of 39.

== Major results ==
2002
UCI Track Cycling World Championships, Copenhagen, Denmark

1st, Team Pursuit (with Peter Dawson, Brett Lancaster and Luke Roberts)

Commonwealth Games, Manchester, England

1st, Team Pursuit

2002 Track Cycling World Cup

2nd, Team Pursuit, Sydney

2003
UCI Track Cycling World Championships, Copenhagen, Denmark

1st, Team Pursuit (with Peter Dawson, Brett Lancaster, Graeme Brown and Luke Roberts)

2004
Olympic Games, Athens, Greece

1st, Team Pursuit

UCI Track Cycling World Championships, Melbourne, Australia

1st, Team Pursuit (with Luke Roberts, Peter Dawson and Ashley Hutchinson)

2004 Track Cycling World Cup

3rd, Team Pursuit, Manchester

2005
National Track Championships, Adelaide

2nd, Team Pursuit
2nd, Pursuit

UCI Track Cycling World Championships, Los Angeles, United States

3rd, Team Pursuit

2006
Commonwealth Games, Melbourne, Australia

2nd, Team Pursuit

UCI Track Cycling World Championships, Bordeaux, France

1st, Team Pursuit (with Peter Dawson, Matt Goss and Mark Jamieson)

2007
1st, Stage 5, Tour of Siam

== Personal life ==
Woolridge had a son and daughter from his first marriage. He had a stepdaughter from his second marriage.
