= Ashley Hutchinson =

Australian track cyclist

Personal information
- Full name: Ashley Hutchinson
- Born: 9 May 1979 (age 47) Cairns, Australia

Cycling career
- Sport: Cycling
- Current team: Retired
- Disciplines: Track; Road
- Role: Rider

Professional teams
- 2004: ComNet–Senges
- 2006: Southaustralia.com–AIS
Medal record
Representing Australia
Men's track cycling
Commonwealth Games
Silver medal – second place	2006 Melbourne	Scratch
Silver medal – second place	2006 Melbourne	Team Pursuit
World Championships
Gold medal – first place	2004 Melbourne	Team Pursuit
Bronze medal – third place	2005 Los Angeles	Team Pursuit

Ashley Hutchinson (born 9 May 1979 in Cairns) is an Australian former track cyclist. He won the team pursuit at the 2004 UCI Track Cycling World Championships with Luke Roberts, Peter Dawson and Stephen Wooldridge. He also won a bronze medal in the event in 2005.

== Major results ==
2000
UCI World Cup, Cali

1st Madison
2nd Team pursuit

2003
3rd Team pursuit, UCI World Cup, Cape Town
2004
1st Team pursuit, UCI World Championships
Oceania Games

1st Points race
1st Scratch

3rd Team pursuit, UCI World Cup, Manchester
2005
1st Team pursuit, 2005–06 UCI World Cup, Moscow
3rd Team pursuit, UCI World Championships
2006
Commonwealth Games

2nd Scratch
2nd Team pursuit
