= Chrystal Lim =

Malaysian rhythmic gymnast

Chrystal Lim Wen Chean
- Born: July 30, 1988 (age 38)

Gymnastics career
- Country represented: Malaysia
Medal record
Commonwealth Games
Silver medal – second place	2006 Melbourne	Team
Bronze medal – third place	2006 Melbourne	Ball
Bronze medal – third place	2006 Melbourne	Ribbon

Chrystal Lim Wen Chean (born 30 July 1988) is a Malaysian rhythmic gymnast.

She competed at the 2006 Commonwealth Games where she won a silver medal in the team event and bronze medals in the ball and ribbon events.
