= Clayton Miller (sport shooter) =

Canadian sports shooter

Personal information
- Born: 7 October 1977 (age 48) Toronto, Ontario, Canada

Sport
- Sport: Sports shooting
Medal record
Representing Canada
Commonwealth Games
Gold medal – first place	2002 Manchester	Skeet
Bronze medal – third place	2006 Melbourne	Skeet
Pan American Games
Bronze medal – third place	1999 Winnipeg	Skeet

Clayton Alexander Miller (born 7 October 1977) is a Canadian sports shooter. He competed in the men's skeet event at the 1996 Summer Olympics.
