= Mathew Helm =

Australian diver

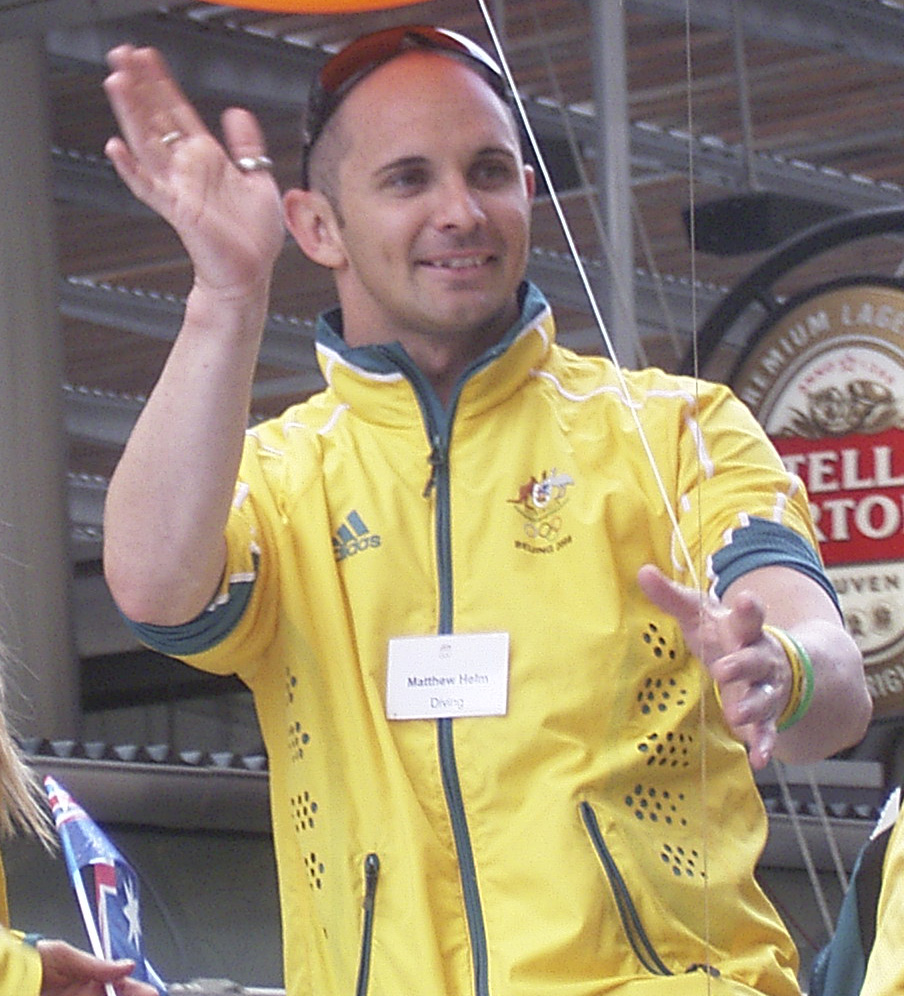

Personal information
- Born: 9 December 1980 (age 45) Bourke, New South Wales
- Height: 170 cm (5 ft 7 in)
- Weight: 62 kg (137 lb)

Sport
- Club: Hunter United Diving Academy
- Coached by: Hui Tong
Medal record
Men's diving
Representing Australia
Olympic Games
Silver medal – second place	2004 Athens	10m Platform
Bronze medal – third place	2004 Athens	Synchro Platform
World Championships
Gold medal – first place	2003 Barcelona	Synchro Platform
Silver medal – second place	2003 Barcelona	10m Platform
Bronze medal – third place	2001 Fukuoka	10m Platform
Commonwealth Games
Gold medal – first place	2006 Melbourne	10m Platform
Gold medal – first place	2006 Melbourne	Synchro Platform
- Updated on 4 October 2015

Mathew Glen Helm (born 9 December 1980) is an Australian diver who won the silver medal at the 2004 Summer Olympics in the men's 10-metre platform. He was in first place at the end of the preliminary round and the semi-finals, but was passed by Chinese diver Hu Jia in the finals. In the 2006 Commonwealth Games held in Melbourne, he won the 10-metre platform gold medals in the Individual and Synchro.

Born in Bourke, New South Wales, Helm was an Australian Institute of Sport scholarship holder. Helm is openly gay.
