= Sayuti Zahit =

Malaysian cyclist

Mohd Sayuti Mohd Zahit
Personal information
- Full name: Mohd Sayuti Mohd Zahit
- Born: 6 April 1984 (age 42) Malaysia

Cycling career
- Sport: Cycling
- Current team: Malaysia Pro Cycling
- Discipline: Road
- Role: Rider (retired); Team manager; Directeur sportif

Professional team
- 2007–2009: LeTua Cycling Team

Managerial team
- 2017–: Team Sapura Cycling

Mohd Sayuti Mohd Zahit (born 6 April 1984) is a Malaysian former professional racing cyclist, who currently works as the team manager for UCI Continental team Malaysia Pro Cycling.

== Major results ==
2007
4th Overall Melaka Chief Minister Cup
2011
4th Road race, National Road Championships
9th Melaka Chief Minister Cup
