= Marco Librizzi =

Scottish track cyclist

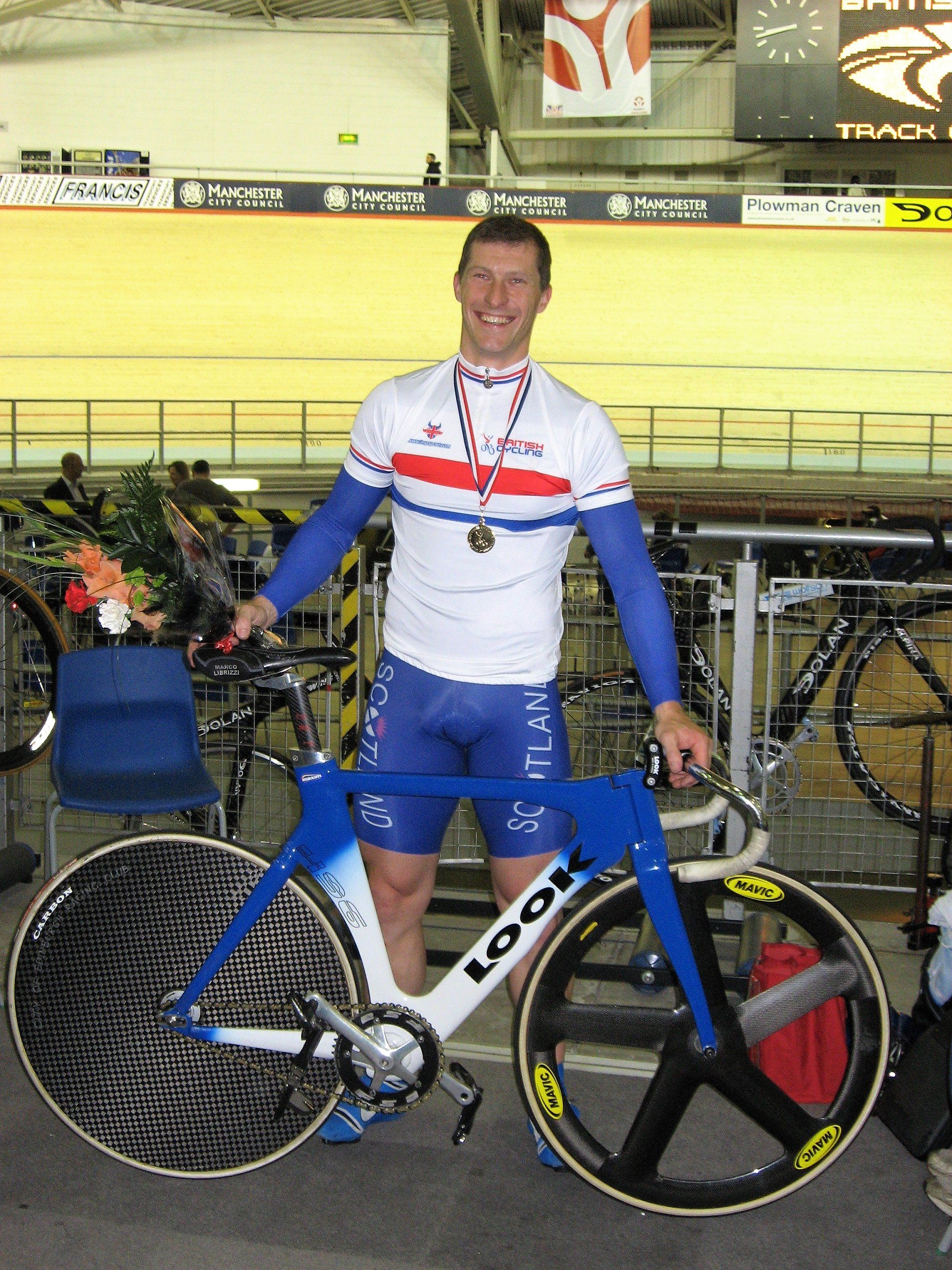
- British Team Sprint Champion 2007

Personal information
- Born: 24 June 1970 (age 56) Edinburgh, Scotland
- Weight: 82 kg (181 lb)

Cycling career
- Sport: Cycling
- Current team: City of Edinburgh Racing Club
- Discipline: Track cycling
- Role: Rider
- Rider type: sprint

Amateur teams
- 1986- 1991: Dunedin CC
- 1992–2007: City Of Edinburgh RC
Medal record
Men's track cycling
Representing Scotland
Commonwealth Games
Bronze medal – third place	2002 Manchester	Team sprint

Marco Librizzi (born 1970) is a British and Scottish retired track cyclist.

== Cycling career ==
Librizzi is a three time British champion winning the Team Sprint Championship, at the 1993 British National Track Championships, 1994 British National Track Championships and 2007 British National Track Championships, the latter with Chris Hoy and Ross Edgar.

He represented Scotland at the 2002 Commonwealth Games and 2006 Commonwealth Games, winning a bronze medal at the 2002 Commonwealth Games in the Team Sprint with Chris Hoy, Craig MacLean and Ross Edgar.

He was a Scottish Individual Sprint Champion 8 times and Team Sprint Champion 8 times between 1992 and 2007. Won 6 World Masters titles in 2003 and 2004 in the Team Sprint, Individual Sprint, and 1 km TT.

== Palmarès ==
2007
1st team sprint, British National Team Sprint Championships
4th keirin sprint, British National Keirin Championships
1st individual sprint, Scottish National Individual Sprint Championships
1st team sprint, Scottish National Team Sprint Championships
4th individual sprint, Devonport UCI sprint GP

2006
7th individual sprint, Commonwealth Games Melbourne
5th individual sprint, British National Individual Sprint Championships
2nd individual sprint, UCI Dudley International sprint
4th keirin sprint, UCI Edinburgh international Sprint GP Keirin
1st individual sprint, Scottish National Individual Sprint Championships
1st team sprint, Scottish National Team Sprint Championships

2005
3rd team sprint, British National Team Sprint Championships
3rd individual sprint, British National Individual Sprint Championships
3rd individual sprint, UCI Dudley International sprint
2nd individual sprint, Good Friday Champions Sprint, London
1st individual sprint, Scottish National Individual Sprint Championships
1st team sprint, Scottish National Team Sprint Championships

2004
2nd team sprint, British National Team Sprint Championships
3rd individual sprint, British National Individual Championships
1st individual sprint, Scottish National Individual Sprint Championships
1st team sprint, Scottish National Team Sprint Championships
1st team sprint, UCI World Masters Championships 30-35 age group
1st individual sprint, UCI World Masters Championships 30-35 age group
1st 1km tt, UCI World Masters Championships 30-35 age group

2003
4th individual sprint, British National Individual Championships
2nd individual sprint, Scottish National Individual Sprint Championships
1st team sprint, Scottish National Team Sprint Championships
1st team sprint, UCI World Masters Championships 30-35 age group
1st individual sprint, UCI World Masters Championships 30-35 age group
1st 1km tt, UCI World Masters Championships 30-35 age group

2002
3rd team sprint, 2002 Commonwealth Games, Manchester
3rd team sprint, British National Team Sprint Championships
2nd individual sprint, Scottish National Individual Sprint Championships
1st team sprint, Scottish National Team Sprint Championships

1994
1st team sprint, British National Team Sprint Championships
3rd keirin sprint, British National Keirin Championships
1st individual sprint, Scottish National Individual Sprint Championships

1993
1st team sprint, British National Team Sprint Championships
5th individual sprint, British National Individual Sprint Championships
1st individual sprint, Scottish National Individual Sprint Championships

1992
5th Individual sprint, British National Individual Sprint Championships
1st individual sprint, Scottish National Individual Sprint Championships
