= Yannick Morin =

Canadian bobsledder

Personal information
- Born: 4 July 1975 (age 49); Montreal, Quebec, Canada

Sport
- Sport: Bobsleigh

Yannick Morin (born 4 July 1975) is a Canadian bobsledder. He competed in the two man event at the 2002 Winter Olympics.
