= Kiara Bisaro =

Canadian mountain biker

Personal information
- Born: November 12, 1975 (age 50) Tofino, British Columbia, Canada

Cycling career
- Sport: Cycling
Medal record
Commonwealth Games
Bronze medal – third place	2006 Melbourne	Cross-country

Kiara Bisaro (born 12 November 1975) is a Canadian mountain biker.

Bisaro participated in the 2004 Summer Olympics in Athens coming 15th in the women's cross-country event.

She won a bronze medal at the 2006 Commonwealth Games in the cross-country event.
