= Blythe Hartley =

Canadian diver (born 1982)

Personal information
- Born: May 2, 1982 (age 44) Edmonton, Alberta, Canada
- Home town: North Vancouver, British Columbia
- Height: 165 cm (5 ft 5 in)

Sport
- Country: Canada
- Event(s): 1m, 3m, 3m synchro, 10m, 10m synchro
- Club: Dive Calgary
- Partner: Melanie Rinaldi (3m)
- Former partner(s): Émilie Heymans (3m & 10m); Eryn Bulmer (3m)
- Coached by: Igor Paskov
Medal record
Olympic Games
Bronze medal – third place	2004 Athens	10m synchro
World Championship
Gold medal – first place	2001 Fukuoka	1m springboard
Gold medal – first place	2005 Montreal	1m springboard
Silver medal – second place	2007 Melbourne	1m springboard
Bronze medal – third place	2003 Barcelona	1m springboard
Pan American Games
Gold medal – first place	2003 Santo Domingo	3m springboard
Gold medal – first place	2003 Santo Domingo	3m synchro
Silver medal – second place	1999 Winnipeg	10m platform
Bronze medal – third place	1999 Winnipeg	3m springboard
Bronze medal – third place	2003 Santo Domingo	10m platform
Commonwealth Games
Gold medal – first place	2006 Melbourne	3m springboard
Gold medal – first place	2006 Melbourne	1m springboard
Silver medal – second place	1998 Kuala Lumpur	1m springboard
Silver medal – second place	2002 Manchester	1m springboard
Bronze medal – third place	2002 Manchester	10m platform

Blythe Michaele Munro Hartley (born May 2, 1982) is a Canadian Olympic diver. She was born in Edmonton, Alberta and began diving at age 12.

== Personal life ==
She went to the National Sport School in Calgary, Alberta with many other top Canadian athletes. Hartley attended Handsworth Secondary School before going on to attend the University of Southern California where she graduated in 2006 with a degree in communications. She was CTV diver analyst during 2012 Summer Olympics.

== Diving career ==
Hartley won her first gold medal at the world aquatic championships in the 1 m springboard in Fukuoka, Japan in 2001, and won a bronze at the 2003 World Aquatics Championships in 3 m springboard in Barcelona, Spain. Her best finish at the 2000 Summer Olympics was in 3 m springboard synchro where she finished 5th. She won her first Olympic medal at the 2004 Summer Olympics where she won a bronze with partner Émilie Heymans in the synchronized 10 m platform event.

Hartley also won a gold medal at the 2005 World Aquatics Championships in Montreal in the springboard event.

The North Vancouver resident concluded her competitive career at the 2008 Beijing Olympics, where she placed fourth in the three-metre springboard.
