= Robert Newbery =

Australian diver

Personal information
- Born: 2 January 1979 (age 47)
Medal record
Men's diving
Representing Australia
Olympic Games
Bronze medal – third place	2000 Sydney	Springboard Synchro
Bronze medal – third place	2004 Athens	Springboard Synchro
Bronze medal – third place	2004 Athens	Platform Synchro
World Championships
Gold medal – first place	2003 Barcelona	Platform Synchro
Commonwealth Games
Silver medal – second place	1998 Kuala Lumpur	10m Platform
Bronze medal – third place	1998 Kuala Lumpur	1m Springboard
Bronze medal – third place	2002 Manchester	3m Springboard

Robert Frederick Newbery (born 2 January 1979 in Adelaide, South Australia) is an Australian former diver. He won a bronze medal in the 2000 Summer Olympics and two bronze medals in the 2004 Summer Olympics, one with synchronised springboard diving partner Steven Barnett. He was an Australian Institute of Sport scholarship holder.

His ex-wife, Chantelle Newbery, is an Olympic gold medalist in diving. His brother, William Newbery, is a viola player with the Tasmanian Symphony Orchestra. He graduated from the University of Queensland with a Bachelor of Medicine, Bachelor of Surgery in 2010. He is currently working at Toowoomba Hospital.
