= Ricardo Lynch =

Jamaican cyclist

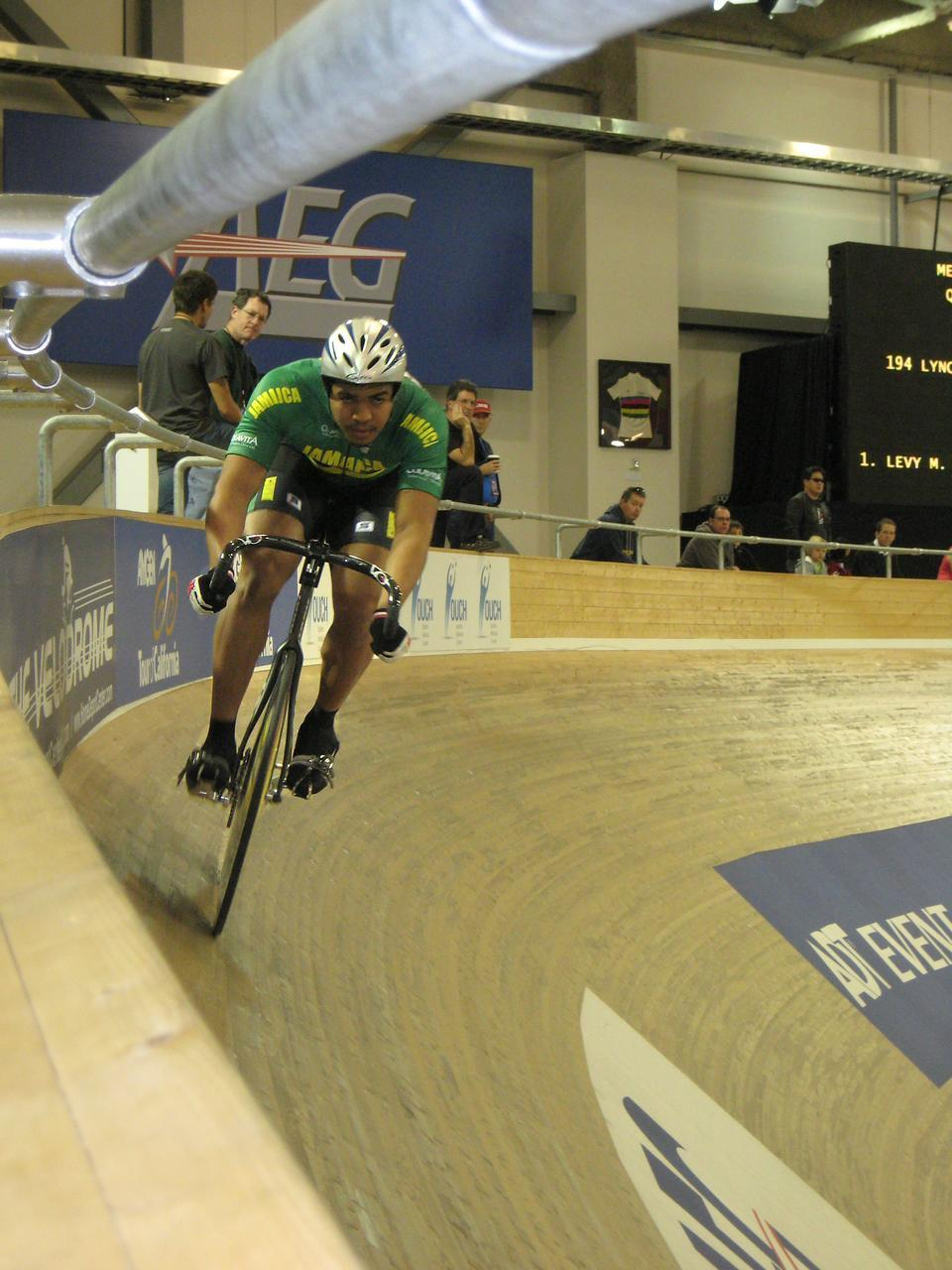

Personal information
- Full name: Ricardo Lynch
- Born: September 20, 1984 (age 42) Jamaica

Cycling career
- Sport: Cycling
- Discipline: Track
- Role: Rider
- Rider type: Sprint
Medal record
Men's Track Cycling
Representing Jamaica
Central American and Caribbean Games
| Silver medal – second place | 2006 Cartagena | Keirin |

Ricardo Lynch (born September 20, 1984) is a Jamaican professional track cyclist. He most prominent result was finishing second to Chris Hoy in the keirin event at the track cycling World Cup round in Copenhagen in 2008.

== Palmarès ==
2008
2007–2008 World Cup

2nd, Keirin, Copenhagen
