= Chantelle Newbery =

Australian diver

Personal information
- Born: Chantelle Lee Michell; 6 May 1977 (age 49) Melbourne, Victoria, Australia
- Height: 153 cm (5 ft 0 in)
- Weight: 50 kg (110 lb)

Sport
- Sport: Diving
- Events: 3m Synchronised Springboard; 10m Platform
- Club: Mel Am Diving Club
Medal record
Women's diving
Representing Australia
Olympic Games
Gold medal – first place	2004 Athens	10m Platform
Bronze medal – third place	2004 Athens	Springboard Synchro
World Championships
Silver medal – second place	2005 Montreal	10m Platform Synchro
Bronze medal – third place	1998 Perth	3m Springboard
Commonwealth Games
Gold medal – first place	1998 Kuala Lumpur	1m Springboard
Gold medal – first place	2006 Melbourne	10m Platform Synchro
Silver medal – second place	1998 Kuala Lumpur	3m Springboard
Silver medal – second place	2006 Melbourne	3m Springboard
Silver medal – second place	2006 Melbourne	10m Platform
- Updated on 2 August 2015

Chantelle Lee Newbery (née Michell) (born 6 May 1977) is an Australian former diver.

She won a gold medal in diving at the 2004 Summer Olympics and in 2006 became the 22nd athlete to be named in the Australian Institute of Sport Awards' "Best of the Best".

== Career ==
Born in Melbourne, Newbury's first international success was at the 1998 World Aquatics Championships in Perth, Australia, where she won a bronze medal in the 3m springboard event. Later that year Newbery became Commonwealth champion by winning the gold medal in the 1m springboard event at the 1998 Commonwealth Games in Kuala Lumpur, Malaysia. She won a silver medal two days later in the 3m springboard.

At the 2000 Olympic Games Newbery finished fourth in the synchronised 3m springboard event. Four years later, she won a gold medal in the 10m platform event at the 2004 Athens Summer Olympic Games ahead of Lao Lishi of China and fellow Australian Loudy Tourky.

In the 2005 Australia Day Honours Newbery was a recipient of the Medal of the Order of Australia (OAM). This was cancelled on 15 September 2022 https://www.legislation.gov.au/C2022G00986/asmade/text

Also in 2005, she was inducted into the Australian Institute of Sport 'Best of the Best'.

== Personal life ==
Newbery took time away from diving for almost a year while pregnant with her first child. She gave birth to her son Jet in 2002. In May 2004, she married fellow diver Robert Newbery; they both competed for Australia at the 2000 and 2004 Olympics. Their second son, Ryder, was born in 2006. The couple later divorced.

In 2009 Newbery told Australian magazine Woman's Day that she was admitting herself to a psychiatric hospital for severe depression. She had also made suicide attempts.

In 2014, Newbery pled guilty to drug charges and was placed in a drug diversion programme after being arrested in possession of methamphetamine. In November 2018, Newbery was charged with six counts of theft, leading to a three-month prison sentence. Her sentence was suspended and she was released on parole.

In 2021, Newbery was caught with an ice pipe while shoplifting. She pleaded guilty to stealing and possessing drug utensils.

In January 2023, Newbery pleaded guilty to stealing groceries in July 2022 and for unlicensed driving in December 2022. She was sentenced to eight months jail but released on parole immediately as she had to care for her 18-month-old niece. She was also disqualified from holding or obtaining a driver's licence for a month.
