= Justin Grace =

New Zealand cyclist

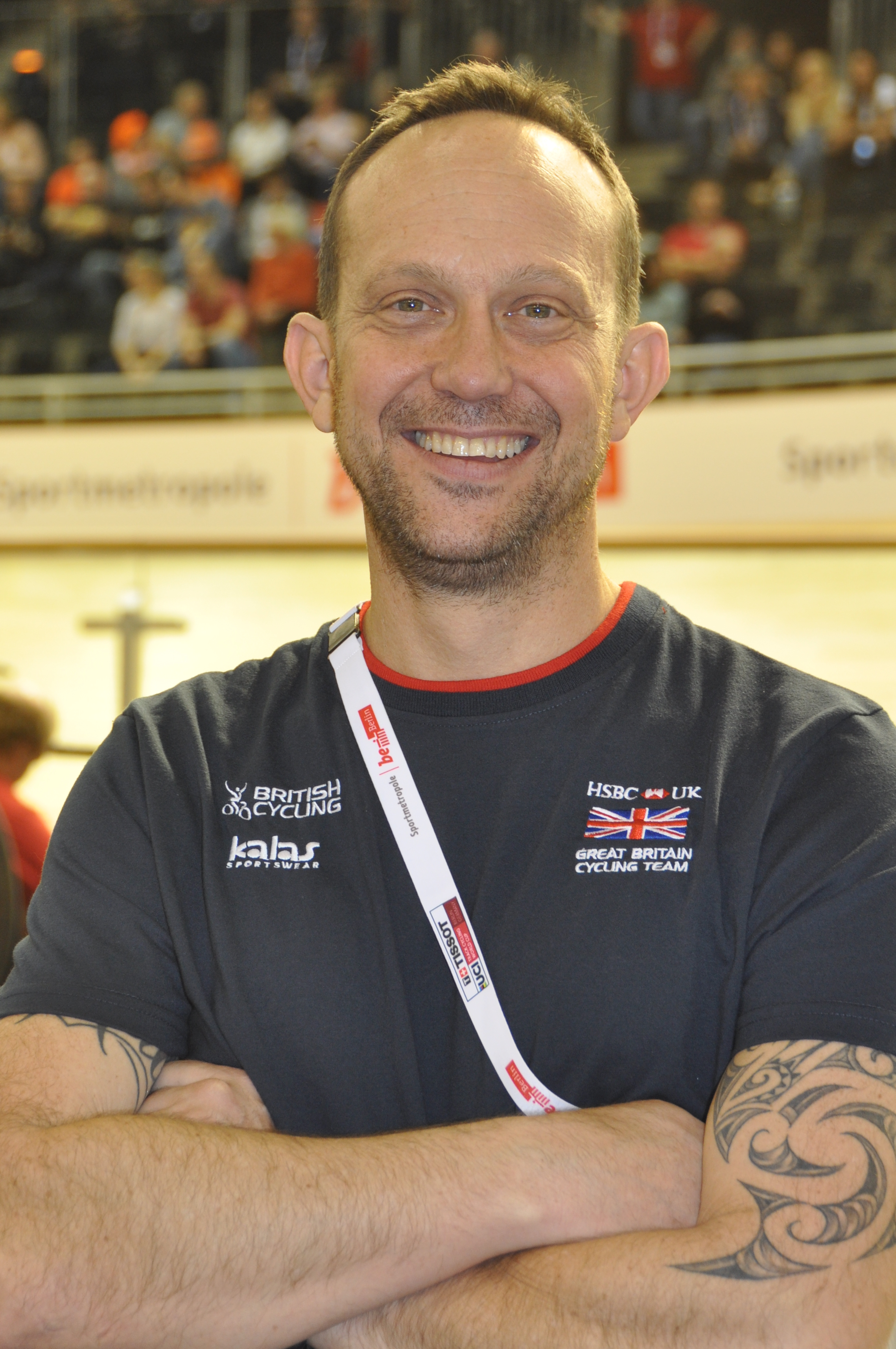
- Justin Grace in 2018

Personal information
- Born: 9 September 1970 (age 56) Calgary, Alberta, Canada

Cycling career
- Sport: Cycling
- Discipline: Track
- Role: Rider

Justin Sean Grace (born 9 September 1970) is a New Zealand former racing cyclist and cycling coach. He represented New Zealand at the 2002 and 2006 Commonwealth Games. In 2014, Grace was appointed the national sprint coach for the Great Britain cycling team.
