= Adam Stewart (cyclist) =

New Zealand racing cyclist (born 1987)

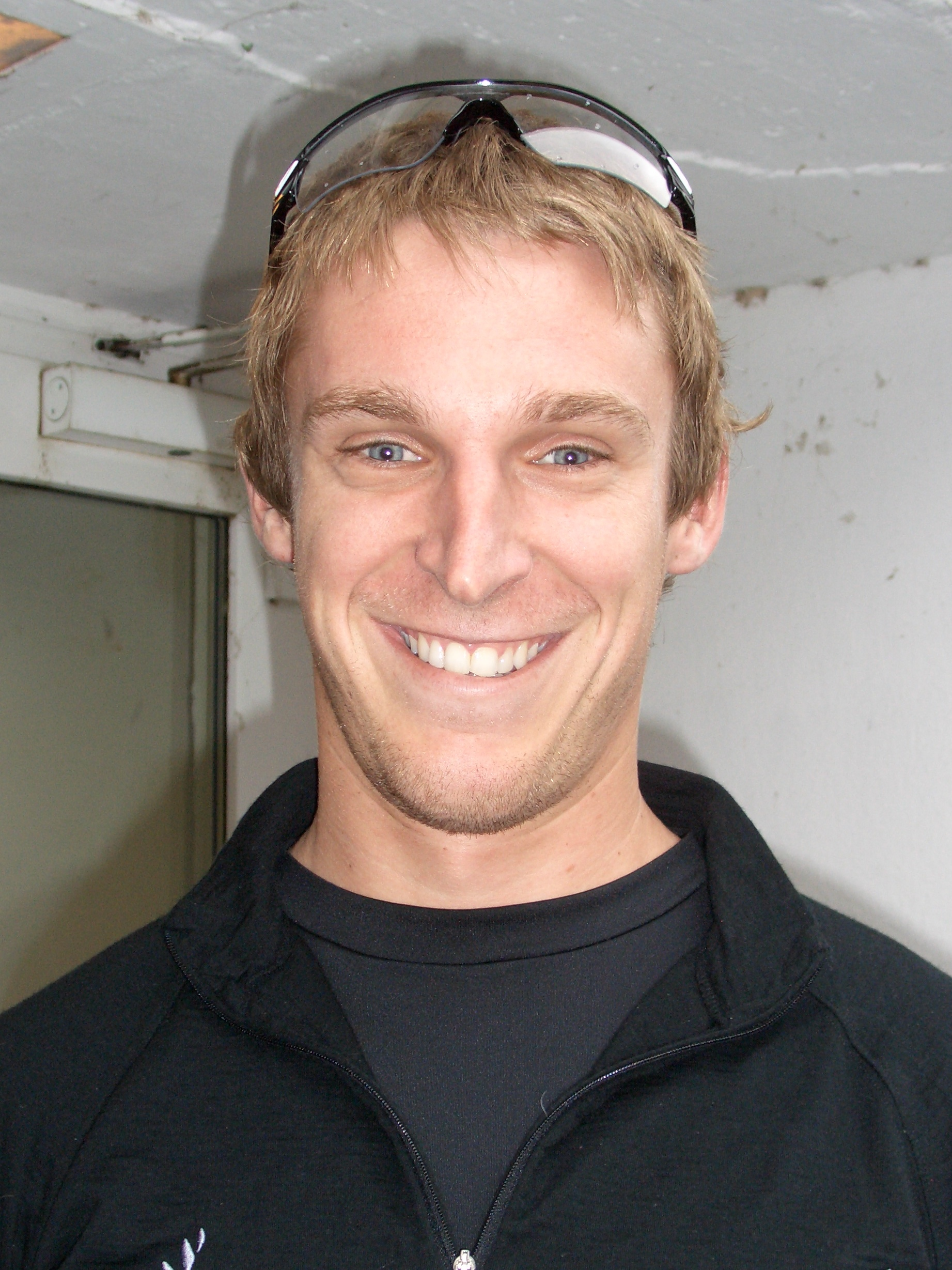
- Adam Stewart

Personal information
- Born: 21 February 1987 (age 39)

Cycling career
- Sport: Cycling
- Discipline: Track cycling
- Role: Rider

Adam Stewart (born 21 February 1987) is a New Zealand male track cyclist, riding for the national team. He competed in the team sprint event at the 2010 UCI Track Cycling World Championships.
