= Travis Smith (cyclist) =

Canadian cyclist (born 1980)

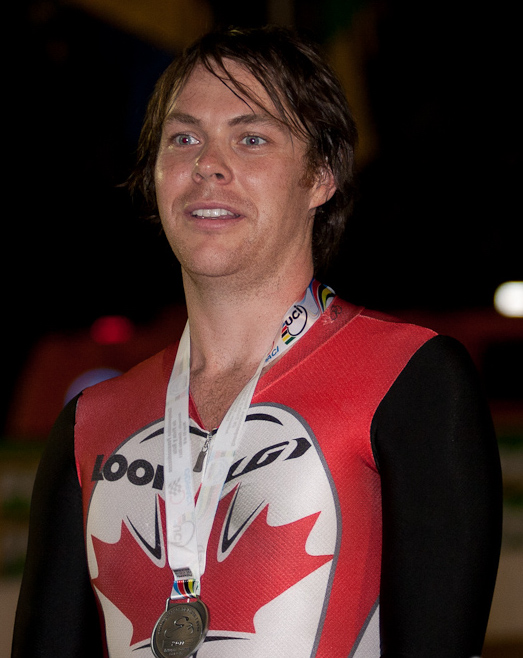

Personal information
- Born: 11 February 1980 (age 46)

Cycling career
- Sport: Cycling
- Discipline: Track cycling
- Role: Rider
- Rider type: sprinter
Medal record
Men's track cycling
Representing Canada
Pan American Championships
Gold medal – first place	2010 Aguascalientes	Sprint
Silver medal – second place	2005 Mar del Plata	Team sprint
Silver medal – second place	2006 São Paulo	Sprint
Silver medal – second place	2006 São Paulo	Keirin
Silver medal – second place	2009 Mexico City	Sprint
Silver medal – second place	2010 Aguascalientes	1km time trial
Silver medal – second place	2011 Medellin	1km time trial
Silver medal – second place	2012 Mar del Plata	Team sprint
Bronze medal – third place	2005 Mar del Plata	1km time trial
Bronze medal – third place	2009 Mexico City	1km time trial
Bronze medal – third place	2012 Mar del Plata	Keirin

Travis Smith (born 11 February 1980) is a Canadian male track cyclist. He competed in at the 2007, 2010 and 2012 UCI Track Cycling World Championships.
