= Diving at the 2006 Commonwealth Games =

- Venue: Melbourne Sports and Aquatic Centre
- Location: Melbourne, Australia
- Dates: 15 to 26 March 2006

Diving at the 2006 Commonwealth Games was the 18th appearance of Diving at the Commonwealth Games. Competition was held in Melbourne, Australia, from 15 to 26 March 2006.

The diving events were held at the Melbourne Sports and Aquatic Centre. There were ten medal events with the introduction of synchronised diving discisplines, an increase of four from 2002.

Australia topped the medal table by virtue of winning five gold medals and more silver medals than Canada.

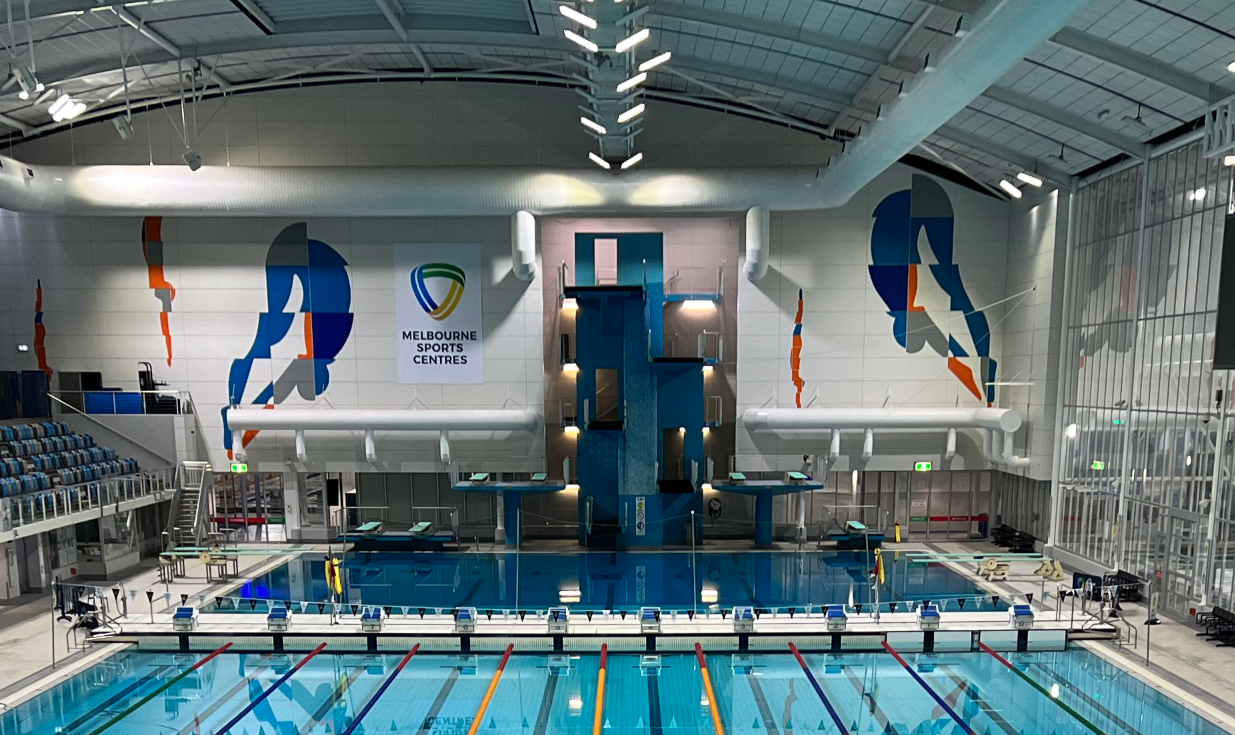
Diving pool at the Melbourne Sports and Aquatic Centre

== Medal table ==
Rank	Nation	Gold	Silver	Bronze	Total
1	Australia*	5	5	5	15
2	Canada	5	1	3	9
3	England	0	2	2	4
4	Malaysia	0	2	0	2
Totals (4 entries)		10	10	10	30

== Medallists ==
=== Men ===
Event	Gold	Silver	Bronze
1m springboard	Alexandre Despatie; Canada	Yeoh Ken Nee; Malaysia	Steven Barnett; Australia
3m springboard	Alexandre Despatie; Canada	Robert Newbery; Australia	Steven Barnett; Australia
10m platform	Mathew Helm; Australia	Peter Waterfield; England	Alexandre Despatie; Canada
Synchronised 3m springboard	Canada; Alexandre Despatie; Arturo Miranda	England; Tony Ally; Mark Shipman	Australia; Robert Newbery; Steven Barnett
Synchronised 10m platform	Australia; Mathew Helm; Robert Newbery	Malaysia; Bryan Nickson; James Sandayud	England; Callum Johnstone; Gary Hunt

=== Women ===
Event	Gold	Silver	Bronze
1m springboard	Blythe Hartley; Canada	Sharleen Stratton; Australia	Kathryn Blackshaw; Australia
3m springboard	Blythe Hartley; Canada	Chantelle Newbery; Australia	Kathryn Blackshaw; Australia
10m platform	Loudy Tourky; Australia	Chantelle Newbery; Australia	Émilie Heymans; Canada
Synchronised 3m springboard	Australia; Briony Cole; Sharleen Stratton	Canada; Melanie Rinaldi; Rebecca Barras	England; Hayley Sage; Tandi Indergaard
Synchronised 10m platform	Australia; Chantelle Newbery; Loudy Tourky	Australia; Alex Croak; Melissa Wu	Canada; Meaghan Benfeito; Roseline Filion
