= Canada at the 2006 Commonwealth Games =

- CG code: CAN
- CGA: Commonwealth Games Canada
- Website: commonwealthgames.ca

in Melbourne, Australia
- Flag bearer (opening): Chantal Petitclerc
- Flag bearer (closing): Alexandra Orlando
- Medals Ranked 3rdth: Gold 26 Silver 28 Bronze 32 Total 86

Commonwealth Games appearances (overview)
- 1930; 1934; 1938; 1950; 1954; 1958; 1962; 1966; 1970; 1974; 1978; 1982; 1986; 1990; 1994; 1998; 2002; 2006; 2010; 2014; 2018; 2022; 2026; 2030

Other related appearances
- Newfoundland (1930, 1934)

Canada is represented at the 2006 Commonwealth Games in Melbourne by a contingent, comprising 253 sportspersons.

== Flag bearers ==
Wheelchair racing athlete Chantal Petitclerc was chosen as Canada's flag bearer at the opening ceremonies. Rhythmic gymnast Alexandra Orlando was chosen as Canada's flag bearer at the closing ceremonies.

== Medallists ==
	(gold)	(silver)	(bronze)	Total
Canada	26	28	32	86

=== Gold Medallists ===
Medal	Name	Sport	Event	Date
Gold	Mark Boswell	Athletics	Men's high jump	22 March
Gold	Chantal Petitclerc	Athletics	Women's 800 metres T54 (wheelchair)	?
Gold	Marie-Hélène Prémont	Cycling	Women's Cross Country	23 March
Gold	Alexandre Despatie	Diving	Men's 1 m springboard	?
Gold	Alexandre Despatie	Diving	Men's 3 m springboard	?
Gold	Alexandre Despatie; Arturo Miranda	Diving	Men's synchronized 3 m springboard	?
Gold	Blythe Hartley	Diving	Women's 1 m springboard	?
Gold	Blythe Hartley	Diving	Women's 3 m springboard	?
Gold	Nathan Gafuik; Grant Golding; David Kikuchi; Kyle Shewfelt; Adam Alexander Wong	Gymnastics	Men's Artistic Team	?
Gold	Adam Alexander Wong	Gymnastics	Men's Floor	?
Gold	Kyle Shewfelt	Gymnastics	Men's Vault	?
Gold	Grant Golding	Gymnastics	Men's Parallel Bars	?
Gold	Carly Orava; Alexandra Michel Orlando; Yana Tsikaridze	Gymnastics	Women's Rhythmic Team	?
Gold	Elyse Hopfner-Hibbs	Gymnastics	Women's Uneven Bars	?
Gold	Elyse Hopfner-Hibbs	Gymnastics	Women's Beam	?
Gold	Alexandra Michel Orlando	Gymnastics	Women's All-around	?
Gold	Alexandra Michel Orlando	Gymnastics	Women's Rope	?
Gold	Alexandra Michel Orlando	Gymnastics	Women's Ball	?
Gold	Alexandra Michel Orlando	Gymnastics	Women's Clubs	?
Gold	Alexandra Michel Orlando	Gymnastics	Women's Ribbon	?
Gold	Mike Brown	Swimming	Men's 200 metre breaststroke	?
Gold	Marie-Pier Boudreau Gagnon	Synchronized swimming	Free routine solo	?
Gold	Marie-Pier Boudreau Gagnon; Isabelle Rampling	Synchronized swimming	Free routine duet	?
Gold	Akos Sandor	Weightlifting	Men's 105 kg	22 March
Gold	Maryse Turcotte	Weightlifting	Women's 53 kg	17 March
Gold	Jeane Lassen	Weightlifting	Women's 69 kg	20 March

=== Silver ===
Athletics:

Nathan Brannen, Men's 1500 m
Jennifer Joyce, Women's Hammer
Jacques Martin, Men's Seated Discus EAD
James Steacy, Men's Hammer
Achraf Tadili, Men's 800 m
Jason Tunks, Men's Discus
Angela Whyte, Women's 100 m Hurdles

Boxing:

Adonis Stevenson, Middleweight 75 kg

Cycling:

Travis Smith, Men's Keirin

Diving:

Women's Synchronised 3 m Springboard

Gymnastics:

Nathan Garfuik, Men's All-Around
Nathan Garfuik, Men's Vault
Elyse Hopfner-Hibbs, Women's All-Around
Yana Tsikaridze, Women's Artistic Ribbon

Shooting:

Kim Eagles, Women's 25 m Pistol
Men's Trap Pairs
Women's 10 m Air Rifle Pairs
Women's Double Trap Pairs

Swimming:

Brent Hayden, Men's 50 m Freestyle
Valerie Grandmaison, Women's 100 m EAD Freestyle
Benoît Huot, Men's 50 m EAD Freestyle
Benoît Huot, Men's 100 m EAD Freestyle
Andrew Hurd, Men's 400 m Freestyle
Andrew Hurd, Men's 1500 m Freestyle
Anne Polinario, Women's 50 m EAD Freestyle

Weightlifting:

Christine Girard, Women's 63 kg
Marilou Dozois-Prévost, Women's 48 kg
Emily Beth Quarton, Women's 58 kg

=== Bronze ===
Athletics:

Stephanie McCann, Women's Pole Vault
Diane Roy, Women's 800 m EAD T54
Dariusz Slowick, Men's Discu
Men's 4x100 m Relay

Cycling:

Kiara Bisaro, Women's Cross Country
Seamus McGrath, Men's Cross Country
Travis Smith, Men's Sprint

Diving:

Alexandre Despatie, Men's 10 m Platform
Émilie Heymans, Women's 10 m Platform
Women's Synchronised 10 m Platform

Gymnastics:

Grant Golding, Men's Pommel Horse
Kyle Shewfelt, Men's Floor
Yana Tsikaridze, Women's Artistic All-Around
Yana Tsikaridze, Women's Artistic Rope
Women's Artistic Team

Lawn Bowls:

Ryan Bester

Shooting:

Kim Eagles, Women's 10 m Air Pistol
Cynthia Meyers, Women's Double Trap
Clayton Miller, Men's Skeet
Susan Marie Nattrass, Women's Trap
Men's 25 m Rapid Fire Pistol Pairs
Women's 25 m Pistol Pairs

Swimming:

Brent Hayden, Men's 200 m Freestyle
Brian Johns, Men's 200 m Individual Medley
Audrey Lacroix, Women's 100 m Butterfly
Anne Polinario, Women's 100 m EAD Freestyle
Brittany Reimer, Women's 800 m Freestyle
Men's 4x100 m Freestyle Relay
Women's 4x100 m Freestyle Relay
Women's 4x100 m Medley Relay

Weightlifting:

Miel McGerrigle, Women's 63 kg

== Canada's Commonwealth Games Team 2006 ==
=== Aquatics ===
==== Diving ====
- Rebecca Barras - 3 m Synchronised
- Meaghan Benfeito - 3 m Synchronised, Platform Synchronised
- Alexandre Despatie - 1 m Springboard, 3 m Springboard, Platform, 3 m Synchronised
- Roseline Filion - Platform, Platform Synchronised
- Kevin Geyson - 3 m Springboard, Platform, 3 m Synchronised, Platform Synchronised
- Wegadesk Gorup-Paul - Platform, Platform Synchronised
- Blythe Hartley - 1 m Springboard, 3 m Springboard
- Émilie Heymans - 3 m Springboard, Platform, Platform Synchronised
- Rachel Kemp - 1 m Springboard, Platform, 3 m Synchronised, Platform Synchronised
- Riley McCormick - Platform Synchronised
- Cameron McLean - 1 m Springboard, 3 m Synchronised, Platform Synchronised
- Arturo Miranda - 1 m Springboard, 3 m Springboard, 3 m Synchronised
- Melanie Rinaldi - 1 m Springboard, 3 m Springboard, 3 m Synchronised

==== Swimming ====
- Maya Beaudry - 400 m Freestyle, 4 × 200 m Freestyle Relay
- Mathieu Bois - 50 m Breaststroke, 100 m Breaststroke, 200 m Breaststroke
- Mike Brown - 50 m breaststroke, 100 m Breaststroke, 200 m Breaststroke, 4 × 100 m Medley Relay
- Ryan Cochrane - 400 m Freestyle, 1500 m Freestyle, 4 × 200 m Freestyle Relay
- Marie-Pier Couillard - 50 m backstroke, 200 m Individual Medley
- Scott Dickens - 50 m Breaststroke, 100 m Breaststroke, 200 m Breaststroke, 4 × 100 m Medley Relay
- Chelsey Gotell - EAD- 50 m Freestyle, EAD- 100 m Freestyle
- Valérie Grand'Maison - EAD- 50 m Freestyle, EAD- 100 m Freestyle
- Brent Hayden - 50 m Freestyle, 100 m Freestyle, 200 m Freestyle, 4 × 100 m Freestyle Relay, 4 × 200 m Freestyle Relay, 4 × 100 m Medley Relay
- Brian Hill - EAD - 50 m Freestyle, EAD- 100 m Freestyle
- Benoît Huot - EAD- 50 m Freestyle, EAD- 100 m Freestyle
- Andrew Hurd - 400 m Freestyle, 1500 m Freestyle, 4 × 200 m Freestyle Relay
- Brian Johns - 100 m Backstroke, 200 m Freestyle, 200 m Individual Medley, 4 × 200 m Freestyle Relay
- Thomas Kindler - 50 m Butterfly, 100 m Butterfly, 4 × 100 m Medley Relay
- Audrey Lacroix - 50 m Butterfly, 100 m Butterfly, 200 m Butterfly, 4 × 100 m Medley Relay
- Yannick Lupien - 50 m Freestyle, 100 m Freestyle, 4 × 100 m Freestyle Relay, 4 × 200 m Freestyle Relay, 4 × 100 m Medley Relay
- Erica Morningstar - 50 m Freestyle, 100 m Freestyle, 200 m Freestyle, 4 × 100 m Freestyle Relay, 4 × 200 m Freestyle Relay, 4 × 100 m Medley Relay
- Anne Polinario - EAD- 50 m Freestyle, EAD- 100 m Freestyle
- Victoria Poon - 50 m Freestyle, 4 × 100 m Freestyle Relay
- Brittany Reimer - 200 m Freestyle, 400 m Freestyle, 800 m Freestyle, 4 × 200 m Freestyle Relay
- Matt Rose - 50 m Backstroke, 50 m Freestyle, 100 m Backstroke, 100 m Freestyle, 4 × 100 m Freestyle Relay, 4 × 100 m Medley Relay
- Darryl Rudolf - 50 m Butterfly, 100 m Butterfly, 4 × 100 m Medley Relay
- Colin Russell - 400 m Freestyle, 4 × 100 m Freestyle Relay, 4 × 200 m Freestyle Relay
- Geneviève Saumur - 50 m Butterfly, 50 m Freestyle, 100 m Freestyle, 4 × 100 m Freestyle Relay, 4 × 200 m Freestyle Relay, 4 × 100 m Medley Relay
- Rick Say - 200 m Freestyle, 4 × 100 m Freestyle Relay, 4 × 200 m Freestyle Relay
- Sophie Simard - 100 m Freestyle, 200 m Butterfly, 200 m Freestyle, 4 × 100 m Freestyle Relay, 4 × 200 m Freestyle Relay
- Kelly Stefanyshyn - 50 m Butterfly, 100 m Backstroke, 100 m Butterfly, 200 m Backstroke, 4 × 100 m Medley Relay
- Desmond Strelzow - 100 m Backstroke, 200 m Backstroke
- Donovan Tildesley - EAD- 50 m Freestyle, EAD- 100 m Freestyle
- Lauren van Oosten - 50 m Breaststroke, 100 m Breaststroke, 200 m Breaststroke, 4 × 100 m Medley Relay
- Landice Yestrau - 50 m Backstroke, 100 m Backstroke, 200 m Backstroke

==== Synchronised swimming ====
- Marie-Pier Boudreau Gagnon - Solo, Duet
- Jessika Dubuc - Duet
- Isabelle Rampling - Duet

=== Athletics ===
- Charles Allen - 110 m Hurdles, 4 × 100 m Relay
- Courtney Babcock -1500 m, 5000 m, 10000 m
- Tim Berrett - 50 km Walk
- Mark Boswell - High Jump
- Nathan Brannen - 800 m, 1500 m
- Erica Broomfield - 100 m, 200 m
- Pierre Browne - 100 m, 200 m, 4 × 100 m Relay
- Reid Coolsaet - 1500 m, 5000 m
- Diane Cummins - 800 m
- Tawa Dortch - 400 m Hurdles, 4 × 400 m Relay
- Carmen Douma-Hussar - 1500 m
- Dana Ellis - Pole Vault
- Malindi Elmore - 1500 m
- Tracey Ferguson - EAD- 800 m T54
- Nicole Forrester - High Jump
- David Gill - 800 m, 1500 m
- Kelsie Hendry - Pole Vault
- Anson Henry - 100 m, 200 m, 4 × 100 m Relay
- Jennifer Joyce - Hammer
- Matthew Kerr - 3000 m Steeplechase
- Lioudmila Kortchguina - Marathon
- Jared MacLeod - 100 m Hurdles
- Jacques Martin - EAD- Seated Discus
- Stephanie McCann - Pole Vault
- Hank Palmer - 100 m, 200 m, 4 × 100 m Relay
- Emanuel Parris - 4 × 100 m Relay
- Chantal Petitclerc - EAD- 800 m T54
- Tara Quinn-Smith - 10000 m
- Gary Reed - 800 m, 4 × 400 m Relay
- Diane Roy - EAD- 800 m T54
- Scott Russell - Javelin
- Dariusz Slowik - Discus
- James Steacy - Hammer
- Hilary Stellingwerff - 1500 m
- Nicole Stevenson - Marathon
- Kevin Sullivan - 1500 m
- Achraf Tadili - 800 m
- Nathan Taylor - 4 × 100 m Relay
- Aimee Teteris - 800 m
- Jason Tunks - Discus
- Katie Vermeulen - 800 m, 1500 m
- Angela Whyte - 100 m Hurdles
- Derek Woodske - Hammer
- Jessica Zelinka - Heptathlon

=== Badminton ===
- Mike Beres - Team (Mixed), Doubles, Mixed Doubles
- Philippe Bourret - Team (Mixed), Singles, Mixed Doubles
- Andrew Dabeka - Team (Mixed), Singles
- Valerie Loker - Team (Mixed), Doubles, Mixed Doubles
- Bobby Milroy - Team (Mixed), Singles
- William Milroy - Team (Mixed), Doubles
- Helen Nichol - Team (Mixed), Doubles, Mixed Doubles
- Charmaine Reid - Team (Mixed), Singles, Doubles
- Anna Rice - Team (Mixed), Singles
- Tammy Sun - Team (Mixed), Doubles, Mixed Doubles

=== Boxing ===
- Kevin Bizier - Light Welterweight (64 kg)
- Glenn Hunter - Light Heavyweight (81 kg)
- Ibrahim Kamal - Lightweight (60 kg)
- Robert Montgomery - Super Heavyweight (over 91 kg)
- Gino Nardari - Heavyweight (91 kg)
- Ryan Rannelli Flyweight (51 kg)
- Isho Shiba - Bantamweight (54 kg)
- Adonis Stevenson - Middleweight (75 kg)
- Adam Trupish - Welterweight (69 kg)
- Arash Usmanee - Featherweight (57 kg)

=== Cycling ===
- Zach Bell - 1000 m Time Trial, 20 km Scratch Race, 40 km Points Race, Road Time Trial
- Lyne Bessette - Road Time Trial, Road Race
- Kiara Bisaro - Individual Cross Country
- Gord Fraser - Road Time Trial, Road Race
- Martin Gilbert - 20 km Scratch Race, 40 km Points Race, Road Race
- Gina Grain - 25 km Points Race, Road Race
- Geoff Kabush - Road Race, Individual Cross Country
- Cam MacKinnon - Sprint, Team Sprint, Keirin
- Seamus McGrath - Individual Cross Country
- Amy Moore - Road Time Trial, Road Race
- Yannik Morin - Sprint, Team Sprint, Keirin
- Sue Palmer-Komar - Road Time Trial, Road Race
- François Parisien - Road Race
- Dominique Perras - Road Race
- Mandy Poitras - 25 km Points Race
- Marie-Hélène Prémont - Individual Cross Country
- Travis Smith - Sprint, 1000 m Time Trial, Team Sprint, Keirin
- Svein Tuft - Road Time Trial, Road Race
- Erinne Willock - Road Race

=== Gymnastics ===
==== Artistic ====
- Alyssa Brown
- Women's Alternate
- Nathan Gafuik
- Crystal Gilmore
- Grant Golding
- Brittnee Habbib
- Elyse Hopfner-Hibbs
- Jenna Kerbis
- David Kikuchi
- Gael Mackie
- Kyle Shewfelt
- Adam Wong

==== Rhythmic ====
- Alexandra Orlando
- Carly Orava
- Yana Tzikaridze

=== Field hockey ===
==== Men ====
- Robin D'Abreo
- Wayne Fernandes
- Connor Grimes
- David Jameson
- Ravi Kahlon
- Michael Lee
- Mike Mahood
- Matthew Peck
- Ken Pereira
- Scott Sandison
- Marian Schole
- Peter Short
- Rob Short
- Paul Wettlaufer
- Philip Wright
- Anthony Wright

==== Women ====
- Megan Anderson
- Johanna Bischof
- Kim Buker
- Deborah Cuthbert
- Sarah Forbes
- Stephanie Hume
- Stephanie Jameson
- Alexandra Johnstone
- Robin Leslie-Spencer
- Clare Linton
- Azelia Liu
- Lauren MacLean
- Tiffany Michaluk
- Kelly Rezansoff
- Andrea Rushton
- Katie Rushton

=== Rugby sevens ===
- Mike Danskin
- Derek Daypuck
- Kyle Haley
- Brodie Henderson
- Matt King
- Robin MacDowell
- Justin Mensah-Coker
- David Moonlight
- Richard O'Malley
- Christoph Strubin
- Akio Tyler
- Morgan Williams

=== Shooting ===
- Tye Bietz - Clay Target- Trap, Trap (Pairs), Double Trap, Double Trap (Pairs)
- Diana Cabrera - Small Bore- 50 m Rifle 3 positions, 50 m Rifle 3 positions (Pairs), 50 m Rifle Prone, 50 m Rifle Prone (Pairs)
- Avianna Chao - Pistol- 10 m Air Pistol, 10 m Air Pistol (Pairs), 25 m Pistol, 25 m Pistol (Pairs)
- Kim Eagles - Pistol- 10 m Air Pistol, 10 m Air Pistol (Pairs), 25 m Pistol, 25 m Pistol (Pairs)
- Monica Fyfe - Small Bore- 10 m Air Rifle, 10 m Air Rifle (Pairs)
- Cindy Hamulas - Small Bore- 10 m Air Rifle, 10 m Air Rifle (Pairs), 50 m Rifle 3 positions, Rifle 3 positions (Pairs), 50 m Rifle Prone, 50 m Rifle Prone (Pairs)
- Michael Hockings - Small Bore- 10 m Air Rifle, 10 m Air Rifle (Pairs), 50 m Rifle 3 positions, 50 m Rifle 3 positions (Pairs)
- Metodi Igorov - Pistol- 25 m Centre Fire Pistol, 25 m Centre Fire Pistol (Pairs), 25 m Rapid Fire Pistol, 25 m Rapid Fire Pistol (Pairs)
- Scott Illingsworth - Pistol- 10 m Air Pistol, 10 m Air Pistol (Pairs), 25 m Standard Fire Pistol, 25 m Standard Fire Pistol (Pairs)
- Cynthia Meyer - Clay Target- Trap, Trap (Pairs), Double Trap, Double Trap (Pairs)
- Clayton Miller - Clay Target- Skeet, Skeet (Pairs)
- Yuri Movshovich - Pistol- 10 m Air Pistol, 10 m Air Pistol (Pairs), 25 m Rapid Fire Pistol (Pairs), 50 m Pistol, 50 m Pistol (Pairs)
- Susan Nattrass - Clay Target- Trap, Trap (Pairs), Double Trap, Double Trap (Pairs)
- Cory Niefer - Small Bore- 10 m Air Rifle, 10 m Air Rifle (Pairs), 50 m Rifle 3 positions, 50 m Rifle 3 positions (Pairs), 50 m Rifle Prone, 50 m Rifle Prone (Pairs)
- James Paton - Full Bore- Queens Prize, Queens Prize (Pairs)
- Kirk Reynolds - Clay Target- Trap, Trap (Pairs), Double Trap, Double Trap (Pairs)
- John Rochon - Pistol- 25 m Centre Fire Pistol, 25 m Centre Fire Pistol (Pairs), 25 m Rapid Fire Pistol, 25 m Rapid Fire Pistol (Pairs), 50 m Pistol, 50 m Pistol (Pairs)
- Johan Sauer - Small Bore- 50 m Rifle Prone, 50 m Rifle Prone (Pairs)
- Joe Trinci - Clay Target- Skeet, Skeet (Pairs)
- Patrick Vamplew - Full Bore- Queens Prize, Queens Prize (Pairs)

=== Squash ===
- Shawn Delierre - Singles, Doubles
- Matthew Giuffre - Singles, Doubles, Mixed Doubles
- Shahier Razik - Singles
- Runa Reta - Singles, Mixed Doubles
- Graham Ryding - Singles

=== Table tennis ===
- Wennin Chiu - Team, Singles, Doubles, Mixed Doubles
- Bence Csaba - Team, Singles, Doubles, Mixed Doubles
- Pierre-Luc Hinse - Team, Singles, Doubles, Mixed Doubles
- Faazil Kassam - Team, Singles, Doubles, Mixed Doubles
- Zhang Mo - Team, Singles, Doubles, Mixed Doubles
- Peter-Paul Pradeeban - Team, Singles, Doubles, Mixed Doubles
- Qiang Shen - Team, Singles, Doubles, Mixed Doubles
- Chris Xu - Team, Singles, Doubles, Mixed Doubles
- Shirley Yan - Team, Singles, Doubles, Mixed Doubles
- Sara Yuen - Team, Singles, Doubles, Mixed Doubles

=== Triathlon ===
==== Men ====
- Colin Jenkins
- Brent McMahon
- Paul Tichelaar

==== Women ====
- Gillian Kornell
- Jill Savege
- Suzanne Weckend

=== Weightlifting ===
==== Men ====
- Kenneth Doyle - EAD- Powerlifting
- Sébastien Groulx - 62 kg
- Francis Luna-Grenier - 69 kg
- Nick Roberts - 94 kg
- Akos Sandor - 105 kg
- Dalas-John Santavy - 94 kg

==== Women ====
- Marilou Dozois-Prévost - 48 kg
- Christine Girard - 63 kg
- Jeane Lassen - 69 kg
- Miel McGerrigle - 63 kg
- Emily Quarton - 58 kg
- Maryse Turcotte - 53 kg

== See also ==
- Canada at the 2007 Pan American Games
- Canada at the 2008 Summer Olympics
