= Swimming at the 2006 Commonwealth Games =

- Venue: Melbourne Sports and Aquatic Centre
- Location: Melbourne, Australia
- Dates: 15 to 26 March 2006

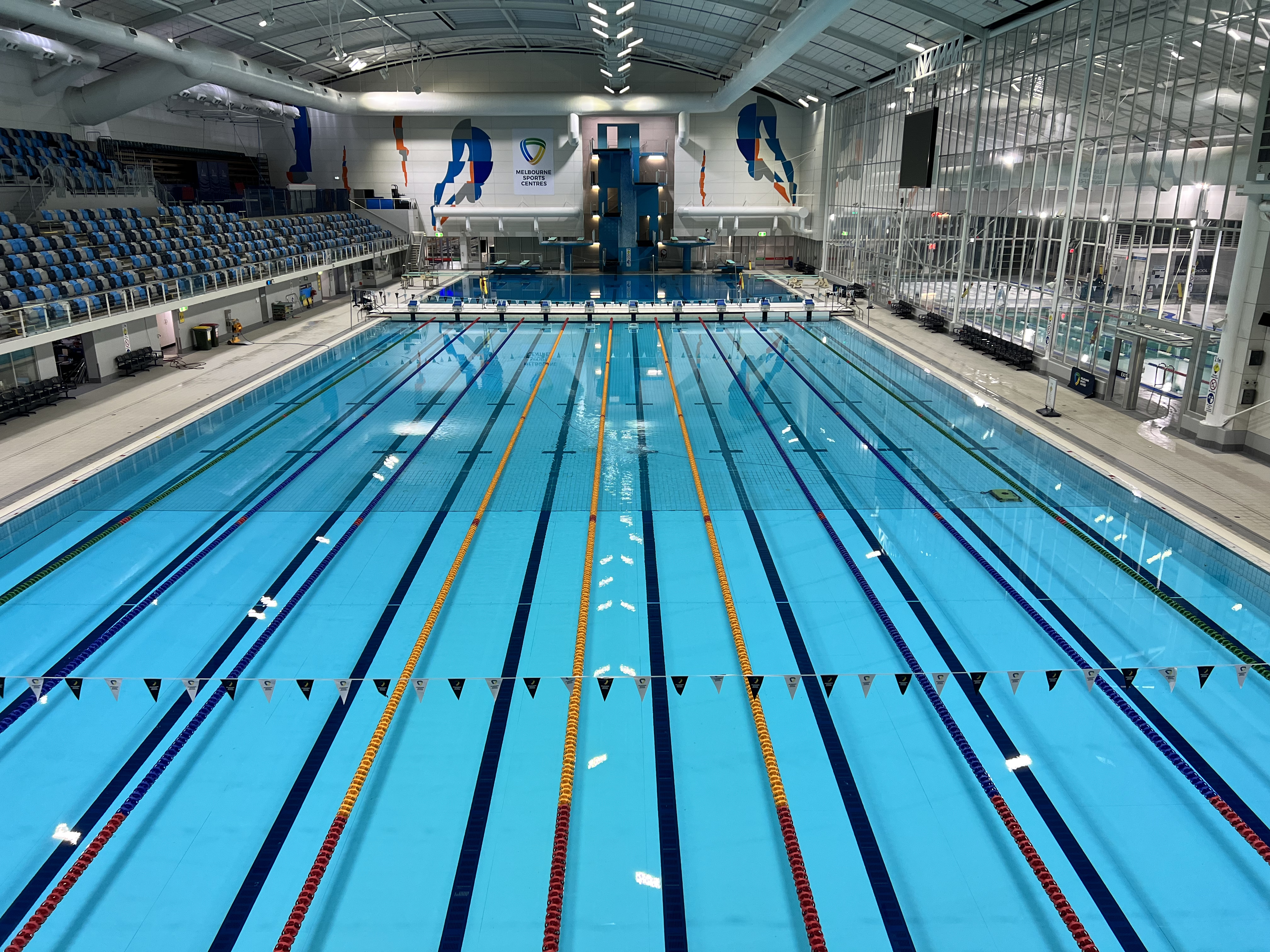
The pool at the Melbourne Sports and Aquatic Centre

Swimming at the 2006 Commonwealth Games was the 18th appearance of Swimming at the Commonwealth Games. Competition was held in Melbourne, Australia, from 15 to 26 March 2006.

The swimming events were held at the Melbourne Sports and Aquatic Centre and featured 42 medal events.

Australia topped the medal table by virtue of winning 19 gold medals.

== Medal table ==
Rank	Nation	Gold	Silver	Bronze	Total
1	Australia*	19	18	17	54
2	England	8	11	4	23
3	Scotland	6	3	3	12
4	South Africa	5	2	5	12
5	Canada	1	7	8	16
6	New Zealand	1	1	4	6
7	Wales	1	0	2	3
8	Papua New Guinea	1	0	0	1
Totals (8 entries)		42	42	43	127

== Medallists ==
=== Men ===
Event	Gold		Silver		Bronze	
50 m freestyle	Roland Schoeman; South Africa	22.03; GR	Brent Hayden; Canada	22.19	Brett Hawke; Australia	22.31
50 m EAD freestyle	Matthew Cowdrey; Australia	26.06; WR	Benoît Huot; Canada	24.84	Matt Walker; England	28.94
100 m freestyle	Simon Burnett; England	48.57; GR	Ryk Neethling; South Africa	49.20	Roland Schoeman; South Africa	49.24
100 m EAD freestyle	Matthew Cowdrey; Australia	56.73; WR	Benoît Huot; Canada	53.22; WR	David Roberts; Wales	1:01.85
200 m freestyle	Ross Davenport; England	1:47.29	Simon Burnett; England	1:47.38	Brent Hayden; Canada	1:47.41
400 m freestyle	David Carry; Scotland	3:48.17	Andrew Hurd; Canada	3:49.08	David Davies; Wales	3:49.44
1500 m freestyle	David Davies; Wales	14:57.63	Andrew Hurd; Canada	15:09.44	Troyden Prinsloo; South Africa	15:11.88
50 m backstroke	Matthew Clay; England	25.04	Liam Tancock; England	25.10	Gerhard Zandberg; South Africa	25.16
100 m backstroke	Liam Tancock; England	54.53; GR	Matthew Welsh; Australia	54.82	Gregor Tait; Scotland	54.89
200 m backstroke	Gregor Tait; Scotland	1:58.65; GR	Johannes Du Rand; South Africa	2:00.32	Cameron Gibson; New Zealand	2:00.72
50 m breaststroke	Chris Cook; England	28.01	Darren Mew; England	28.07	Brenton Rickard; Australia	28.14
100 m breaststroke	Chris Cook; England	1:00.98	James Gibson; England	1:01.10	Brenton Rickard; Australia	1:01.17
200 m breaststroke	Mike Brown; Canada	2:12.23; GR	Brenton Rickard; Australia	2:12.24	Jim Piper; Australia	2:12.26
50 m butterfly	Roland Schoeman; South Africa	23.34	Matthew Welsh; Australia	23.63	Michael Klim; Australia	23.74
100 m butterfly	Ryan Pini; Papua New Guinea	52.64	Michael Klim; Australia	52.70	Moss Burmester; New Zealand	52.73
200 m butterfly	Moss Burmester; New Zealand	1:56.64; GR	Travis Nederpelt; Australia	1:57.26	Joshua Krogh; Australia	1:59.18
200 m individual medley	Gregor Tait; Scotland	2:00.73	Dean Kent; New Zealand	2:01.08	Brian Johns; Canada	2:01.56
400 m individual medley	David Carry; Scotland	4:15.98; GR	Euan Dale; Scotland	4:17.15	Travis Nederpelt; Australia	4:17.24
4 × 100 m freestyle relay	South Africa; Roland Schoeman (48.65); Lyndon Ferns (48.43); Gerhard Zandberg (49.44); Ryk Neethling (48.45)	3:14.97; GR	Australia; Michael Klim (49.28); Eamon Sullivan (48.21); Brett Hawke (49.49); Ashley Callus (48.46)	3:15.54	Canada; Yannick Lupien (49.65); Matthew Rose (48.85); Colin Russell (49.11); Brent Hayden (48.13)	3:15.74
4 × 200 m freestyle relay	England; Simon Burnett (1:47.57); Alexander Scotcher (1:50.01); Dean Milwain (1:49.85); Ross Davenport (1:46.71)	7:14.14	Scotland; David Carry (1:48.25); Euan Dale (1:48.99); Andrew Hunter (1:48.54); Robert Renwick (1:48.62)	7:14.40	Australia; Nicholas Ffrost (1:48.91); Kenrick Monk (1:47.87); Andrew Mewing (1:48.65); Joshua Krogh (1:49.56)	7:14.99
4 × 100 m medley relay	Australia; Matt Welsh (54.84); Brenton Rickard (59.51); Michael Klim (51.87); Eamon Sullivan (48.15); Andrew Lauterstein*; Christian Sprenger*; Adam Pine*; Kenrick Monk*	3:34.37	England; Liam Tancock (54.42); Chris Cook (1:00.29); Matthew Bowe (52.53); Ross Davenport (49.16)	3:36.40	Scotland; Gregor Tait (55.15); Kristopher Gilchrist (1:01.83); Todd Cooper (52.85); Craig Houston (49.92); Chris Jones*	3:39.75

Legend

- WR: World record, (EAD events: World record)
- GR: Games record
- *: Swam only in the heats

=== Women ===
Event	Gold		Silver		Bronze	
50 m freestyle	Libby Lenton; Australia	24.61; GR	Jodie Henry; Australia	24.72	Alice Mills; Australia	25.03
50 m EAD freestyle	Natalie du Toit; South Africa	29.27; WR	Anne Polinario; Canada	28.63	Annabelle Williams; Australia	30.25
100 m freestyle	Libby Lenton; Australia	53.54; GR	Jodie Henry; Australia	53.78	Alice Mills; Australia	54.31
100 m EAD freestyle	Natalie du Toit; South Africa	1:01.81	Valérie Grand'Maison; Canada	1:01.02	Anne Polinario; Canada	1:03.10
200 m freestyle	Caitlin McClatchey; Scotland	1:57.25; GR	Libby Lenton; Australia	1:57.51	Melanie Marshall; England	1:58.11
400 m freestyle	Caitlin McClatchey; Scotland	4:07.69	Joanne Jackson; England	4:08.36	Bronte Barratt; Australia	4:08.65
800 m freestyle	Rebecca Cooke; England	8:29.50	Melissa Gorman; Australia	8:30.79	Brittany Reimer; Canada	8:38.05
50 m backstroke	Sophie Edington; Australia	28.42 =GR	Giaan Rooney; Australia	28.43	Tayliah Zimmer; Australia	28.71
100 m backstroke	Sophie Edington; Australia	1:00.93; GR	Giaan Rooney; Australia	1:01.42	Melanie Marshall; England	1:01.55
200 m backstroke	Joanna Fargus; Australia	2:10.36; GR	Melanie Marshall; England	2:10.87	Hannah McLean; New Zealand	2:12.47
50 m breaststroke	Leisel Jones; Australia	30.55	Jade Edmistone; Australia	30.84	Tarnee White; Australia	31.26
100 m breaststroke	Leisel Jones; Australia	1:05.09; WR	Jade Edmistone; Australia	1:07.24	Kirsty Balfour; Scotland	1:07.83
200 m breaststroke	Leisel Jones; Australia	2:20.72; GR	Kirsty Balfour; Scotland	2:24.04	Suzaan van Biljon; South Africa	2:25.39
50 m butterfly	Danni Miatke; Australia	26.43; GR	Jessicah Schipper; Australia	26.65	Alice Mills; Australia	26.78
50 m butterfly	Danni Miatke; Australia	26.43; GR	Jessicah Schipper; Australia	26.65	Lize-Mari Retief; South Africa	26.78
100 m butterfly	Jessicah Schipper; Australia	57.48; GR	Libby Lenton; Australia	57.80	Audrey Lacroix; Canada	58.89
200 m butterfly	Jessicah Schipper; Australia	2:06.09; GR	Felicity Galvez; Australia	2:08.16	Terri Dunning; England	2:09.87
200 m individual medley	Stephanie Rice; Australia	2:12.90; GR	Brooke Hanson; Australia	2:13.62	Lara Carroll; Australia	2:13.86
400 m individual medley	Stephanie Rice; Australia	4:41.91; GR	Rebecca Cooke; England	4:44.60	Jennifer Reilly; Australia	4:47.13
4 × 100 m freestyle relay	Australia; Libby Lenton (53.74); Jodie Henry (53.30); Alice Mills (54.42); Shayne Reese (55.03)	3:36.49	England; Melanie Marshall (55.24); Rosalind Brett (55.22); Amy Smith (57.22); Francesca Halsall (55.01)	3:42.69	Canada; Erica Morningstar (55.63); Victoria Poon (56.24); Geneviève Saumur (54.85); Sophie Simard (56.12)	3:42.84
4 × 200 m freestyle relay	Australia; Libby Lenton (2:00.04); Bronte Barratt (1:59.14); Kelly Stubbins (1:58.98); Linda Mackenzie (1:58.52)	7:56.68	England; Joanne Jackson (1:59.12); Kate Richardson (2:01.86); Julia Beckett (2:00.80); Melanie Marshall (1:59.45)	8:01.23	New Zealand; Lauren Boyle (2:00.49); Helen Norfolk (2:00.56); Alison Fitch (2:00.35); Melissa Ingram (2:00.80)	8:02.20
4 × 100 m medley relay	Australia; Sophie Edington (1:01.06); Leisel Jones (1:05.51); Jessicah Schipper (56.86); Libby Lenton (52.87)	3:56.30; WR	England; Melanie Marshall (1:01.64); Kate Haywood (1:08.54); Terri Dunning (59.40); Fran Halsall (55.03)	4:04.61	Canada; Kelly Stefanyshyn (1:02.26); Lauren van Oosten (1:09.53); Audrey Lacroix (59.27); Erica Morningstar (54.89)	4:05.95

Legend

- WR: World record, (EAD events: World record)
- GR: Games record
