= England at the 2006 Commonwealth Games =

- CG code: ENG
- CGA: Commonwealth Games England
- Website: weareengland.org

in Melbourne, Australia
- Competitors: 348 (185 Men, 163 Women) in 16 sports
- Flag bearers: Opening: Tony Ally (Diver); Closing: Mick Gault (Shooter)
- Officials: 173
- Medals Ranked 2nd: Gold 36 Silver 40 Bronze 35 Total 111

Commonwealth Games appearances (overview)
- 1930; 1934; 1938; 1950; 1954; 1958; 1962; 1966; 1970; 1974; 1978; 1982; 1986; 1990; 1994; 1998; 2002; 2006; 2010; 2014; 2018; 2022; 2026; 2030

England at the 2006 Commonwealth Games were represented by the Commonwealth Games Council for England (CGCE). The country went by the abbreviation ENG and used the St George's Cross as flag and Land of Hope and Glory as the national anthem.

Diver Tony Ally bore England's flag at the opening ceremony whilst shooter Mick Gault bore the flag during the closing ceremony, both chosen by a vote of England team managers from a list of nominations.

England finished second in the medal table behind Australia with 36 gold medals, 40 silver medals and 34 bronze medals.

== Expectations ==
England entered these Games, held in Melbourne; Australia, after playing hosts to the previous Games in Manchester in Manchester 2002. The medal tally was not expected to be a large as at the 2002 Games, where England had a home advantage and achieved a total of 166 medals including 54 Gold, 51 Silver and 60 Bronze to finish in second place behind Australia. A strong second place in the medal tally was, however, still expected.

The country sent a large team, with competitors taking part in every sport in the schedule. The largest teams were sent in athletics and swimming and it was in these sports, along with cycling and shooting that the team hoped to win most medals. Though there were medal hopes across most sports.

== Medals ==
=== Medal table (top three) ===
Rank	Nation	Gold	Silver	Bronze	Total
1	Australia	84	69	69	222
2	England	36	40	35	111
3	Canada	26	29	31	86
Totals (3 entries)		146	138	135	419

=== Medals by sport ===
Sport	Gold	Silver	Bronze	Total
Swimming	8	11	4	23
Shooting	6	8	5	19
Athletics	6	4	8	18
Boxing	5	1	2	8
Cycling	4	5	2	11
Gymnastics	2	2	2	6
Badminton	2	1	2	5
Squash	2	1	2	5
Table Tennis	1	1	1	3
Diving	0	2	1	3
Lawn Bowls	0	1	1	2
Rugby Sevens	0	1	0	1
Synchronised Swimming	0	1	0	1
Weightlifting	0	1	0	1
Basketball	0	0	2	2
Hockey	0	0	1	1
Netball	0	0	1	1
Triathlon	0	0	0	0
England	36	40	35	111

== Medallists ==
Medal	Name	Sport	Event
Gold	Lisa Dobriskey	Athletics	Women's 1,500m
Gold	Phillips Idowu	Athletics	Men's Triple Jump
Gold	Dean Macey	Athletics	Men's Decathlon
Gold	Nicholas Nieland	Athletics	Men's Javelin
Gold	Christine Ohuruogu	Athletics	Women's 400m
Gold	Kelly Sotherton	Athletics	Women's Heptathlon
Gold	Tracey Hallam	Badminton	Women's Singles
Gold	Gail Emms & Nathan Robertson	Badminton	Mixed Doubles
Gold	Don Broadhurst	Boxing	Men's Flyweight 51 kg
Gold	Stephen Smith	Boxing	Men's Featherweight 57 kg
Gold	Frankie Gavin	Boxing	Men's Lightweight 60 kg
Gold	James Russan	Boxing	Men's Light Welterweight 64 kg
Gold	David Price	Boxing	Men's Super Heavyweight +91 kg
Gold	Liam Killeen	Cycling	Men's Mountain Bike
Gold	Paul Manning	Cycling	Men's 4,000m Individual Pursuit
Gold	Victoria Pendleton	Cycling	Women's Sprint
Gold	Paul Manning, Steve Cummings, Rob Hayles & Chris Newton	Cycling	Men's Team Pursuit
Gold	Imogen Cairns	Gymnastics	Women's Vault
Gold	Louis Smith	Gymnastics	Men's Pommel Horse
Gold	Mick Gault	Shooting	Men's 25m Standard Pistol
Gold	Charlotte Kerwood	Shooting	Women's Double Trap
Gold	Chris Hector & Mike Babb	Shooting	Men's 50m Rifle Prone Pairs
Gold	Glyn Barnett & Parag Patel	Shooting	Open Full Bore Pairs
Gold	Louise Minett & Becky Spicer	Shooting	Women's 50m Rifle 3 Position Pairs
Gold	Charlotte Kerwood & Rachel Parish	Shooting	Women's Double Trap Pairs
Gold	Peter Nicol	Squash	Men's Singles
Gold	Lee Beachill & Peter Nicol	Squash	Men's Doubles
Gold	Simon Burnett	Swimming	Men's 100m Freestyle
Gold	Matthew Clay	Swimming	Men's 50m Backstroke
Gold	Chris Cook	Swimming	Men's 100m Breaststroke
Gold	Chris Cook	Swimming	Men's 50m Breaststroke
Gold	Rebecca Cooke	Swimming	Women's 800m Freestyle
Gold	Ross Davenport	Swimming	Men's 200m Freestyle
Gold	Liam Tancock	Swimming	Men's 100m Backstroke
Gold	Simon Burnett, Alexander Scotcher, Dean Milwain & Ross Davenport	Swimming	Men's 4x00m Freestyle Relay
Gold	Susan Gilroy	Table Tennis	Women's Singles EAD

=== Silver ===
Athletics:

Martyn Bernard, Men's High Jump
Natasha Danvers, Women's 400 m Hurdles
Joanne Pavey, Women's 5000 m
Emma Ania, Anyika Onuora, Laura Turner & Kim Wall, Women's 4 × 100 m Relay

Badminton:

Mixed Team

Boxing:

Darran Langley, Light Flyweight 48 kg

Cycling:

Rob Hayles, Men's 4000 m Individual Pursuit
Victoria Pendleton, Women's 500 m Time Trial
Jason Queally, Men's 1 km Time Trial
Oli Beckinsale, Men's Mountain Bike
Men's Team Sprint

Diving:

Peter Waterfield, Men's 10 Platform
Men's Synchronised 3 m Springboard

Gymnastics:

Shavahn Church, Women's Uneven Bars
Women's Artistic Team

Lawn Bowls:

Men's Pairs

Rugby Sevens:

Men's

Shooting:

Mike Babb, Men's 50 m Rifle Prone
Mick Gault, Men's 50 m Pistol
Rachel Parish, Women's Double Trap
Patel Parag, Open Full Bore
Men's 10 m Air Pistol Pairs
Men's 25 m Centre Fire Pistol Pairs
Men's Skeet Pairs
Women's 50 m Rifle Prone Pairs

Squash:

Vicky Botwright & James Willstrop, Mixed Doubles

Swimming:

Simon Burnett, Men's 200 m Freestyle
Rebecca Cooke, Women's 400 m Individual Medley
James Gibson, Men' 100 m Breaststroke
Joanne Jackson, Women's 400 m Freestyle
Melanie Marshall, Women's 200 m Backstroke
Darren Mew, Men's 50 m Breaststroke
Liam Tancock, Men's 50 m Backcrawl
Men's 4 × 100 m Medley Relay
Women's 4 × 100 m Freestyle Relay
Women's 4 × 100 m Medley Relay
Women's 4 × 200 m Freestyle Relay

Synchronised Swimming:

Jenna Randall, Synchronised Swimming Solo

Table Tennis:

Andrew Baggaley & Andrew Rushton, Men's Doubles

Weightlifting:

Jason Irving, Open EAD Powerlifting

=== Bronze ===
Athletics:

Jessica Ennis, Women's Heptathlon
Stephen Lewis, Men's Pole Vault
Dan Robinson, Men's Marathon
Lorraine Shaw, Women's Hammer
Andrew Turner, Men's 110 m Hurdles
Nadia Williams, Women's Triple Jump
Mara Yamauchi, Women's 10000 m
Elizabeth Yelling, Women's Marathon

Badminton:

Robert Blair & Anthony Clark, Men's Doubles
Gail Emms & Donna Kellogg, Women's Doubles

Basketball:

Men's basketball
Women's basketball

Boxing:

Neil Perkins, Welterweight 69 kg
James Degale, Middleweight 75 kg

Cycling:

Stephen Cummings, Men's Individual Pursuit
Emma Jones, Women's Individual Pursuit

Diving:

Women's Synchronised 3 m Springboard

Gymnastics:

Becky Downie, Women's Beam
Men's Artistic Team

Hockey:

Women's Hockey

Lawn Bowls:

Women's Triples

Netball:

Women's Netball

Shooting:

Pinky Le Grelle, Women's Skeet
Men's 50 m Pistol Pairs
Men's 50 m Rifle 3 Positions Pairs
Men's Double Trap Pairs
Women's 10 m Air Pistol Pairs

Squash:

Lee Beachill, Men's Singles
Tania Bailey & Vicky Botwright, Women's Doubles

Swimming:

Terri Dunning, Women's 200 m Butterfly
Melanie Marshall, Women's 200 m Freestyle
Melanie Marshall, Women's 100 m Backstroke
Matthew Benedict Walker, Men's 50 m EAD Freestyle

Table Tennis:

Catherine Mitton, Women's Singles EAD

== Athletics ==
Team England sent a team of 89 athletes to compete in the Commonwealth Games Athletics meet. The team won 18 medals at the 2006 Commonwealth Games Athletics Meet; six gold, four silver and eight bronze.

Men
Track

Athlete	Events	Heat		Quarterfinal		Semifinal		Final	
Athlete	Events	Result	Rank	Result	Rank	Result	Rank	Result	Rank
Andrew Baddeley	1500 m					3:40.60	7 Q	4:24.14	12
Adam Bowden	3000 m steeplechase							8:43.08	9
Darren Campbell	200 m	20.94	14 Q	DSQ	–	did not advance			
Matt Cliff	100 m EAD (T12)					12.42	12	did not advance	
Marlon Devonish	100 m	10.23	2 Q	10.21	2 Q	10.27	8 Q	10.30	8
Marlon Devonish	200 m	20.70	5 Q	20.60	8 Q	20.93	9	did not advance	
Matthew Douglas	400 m hurdles			50.71	13 Q	50.56	11	did not advance	
Mo Farah	5000 m							13:40.53	9
Jason Gardener	100 m	10.41	7 Q	10.58	20	did not advance			
Damien Greaves	110 m hurdles					13.71	9	did not advance	
Luke Gunn	3000 m steeplechase							9:08.02	9
David Hughes	110 m hurdles					13.58	4 Q	13.70	7
Daniel King	20km walk							1:31:17	6
Dominic King	20km walk							1:32:21	7
Chris Lambert	200 m	21.20	25 Q	DNS	–	did not advance			
Mark Lewis-Francis	100 m	10.20	1 Q	10.41	12 Q	DSQ	–	did not advance	
Nick McCormick	1500 m					3:38.66	4 Q	3:39.55	5
Andrew Penn	20km walk							1:32:54	8
Chris Rawlinson	400 m hurdles			49.67	3 Q	49.21	5 Q	52.89	8
Dan Robinson	Marathon							2:14:50	Bronze medal
Martyn Rooney	400 m	45.69	3 Q			45.35	4 Q	45.51	5
Stuart Stokes	3000 m steeplechase							8:29.94	5
Gavin Thompson	10000 m							29:41.77	8
Robert Tobin	400 m	46.20	14 Q			45.74	11	did not advance	
Andrew Turner	110 m hurdles					13.62	5 Q	13.70	Bronze medal
Mark Lewis-Francis; Andrew Turner; Darren Campbell; Marlon Devonish	4 × 100 m relay					DNF	–	did not advance	
Andrew Steele; Martyn Rooney; Matthew Douglas; Robert Tobin; Marlon Devonish	4 × 400 m relay					3:03.91	2 Q	3:02.01	4

- Q : Qualified for next round
- DNS : Did not start race
- DNF : Did not finish race
- DSQ : Disqualified
- EAD (T12) : event for athlete with a disability (sight impaired category)

Field

Athlete	Events	Qualification		Final	
Athlete	Events	Result	Rank	Result	Rank
Martyn Bernard	High Jump	2.15	5 Q	2.26	Silver medal
Simon Bown	Hammer			65.42	6
Nick Buckfield	Pole Vault			5.35	4
Ben Challenger	High Jump	2.10	8 Q	2.15	8
Andrew Frost	Hammer			72.62	4
Phillips Idowu	Triple Jump			17.45	Gold medal
Michael Jones	Hammer			70.09	5
Steve Lewis	Pole Vault			5.50	Bronze medal
Carl Myerscough	Shot Put	18.95	3 Q	19.07	4
Carl Myerscough	Discus	58.29	7 Q	60.64	5
Nick Nieland	Javelin			80.10	Gold medal
David Parker	Javelin			72.95	9
Tom Parsons	High Jump	2.15	4 Q	2.10	11
Mark Proctor	Shot Put	15.91	11 Q	17.59	8
Scott Rider	Shot Put	17.86	6 Q	17.10	9
Greg Rutherford	Long Jump	7.83	6 Q	7.85	8
Chris Tomlinson	Long Jump	7.67	10 Q	7.96	6
Emeka Udechuku	Discus	57.90	8 Q	59.36	7

- Q : Qualified for final

Combined events

Athlete	Event	Final			
Athlete	Event	Discipline	Result	Points	Rank
Dean Macey	Decathlon	100m	11.17	823	5
Dean Macey	Decathlon	Long Jump	7.28	881	2
Dean Macey	Decathlon	Shot Put	15.83	841	1
Dean Macey	Decathlon	High Jump	2.08	878	1
Dean Macey	Decathlon	400m	49.63	832	3
Dean Macey	Decathlon	110m hurdles	14.94	857	5
Dean Macey	Decathlon	Discus	46.76	803	3
Dean Macey	Decathlon	Pole Vault	4.70	819	1
Dean Macey	Decathlon	Javelin	56.93	692	4
Dean Macey	Decathlon	1500m	4:34.22	717	3
Dean Macey	Decathlon	Overall	–	8143	Gold medal

Women
Track

Athlete	Events	Heat		Semifinal		Final	
Athlete	Events	Result	Rank	Result	Rank	Result	Rank
Emma Ania	100m	11.44	6 Q	11.45	8 Q	11.51	8
Joanna Ankier	3000m steeplechase					9:53.12	7
Tina Brown	3000m steeplechase					10:09.14	8
Helen Clitheroe	1500m	1:11.05	7 Q			4:06.81	4
Natasha Danvers-Smith	400m hurdles	55.47	2 Q			55.17	Silver medal
Lisa Dobriskey	1500m	4:10.02	3 Q			4:06.21	Gold medal
Donna Fraser	400m	DNS	–	did not advance			
Natalie Harvey	5000m					15:51.94	9
Johanna Jackson	20km walk					1:42:04	7
Debra Mason	Marathon					DNF	–
Niobe Menendez	20km walk					1:47:35	8
Christine Ohuruogu	400m	51.97	3 Q	50.87	1 Q	50.28	Gold medal
Marilyn Okoru	800m	2:05:01	15 Q	2:00:84	4 Q	2:01.65	7
Anyika Onuora	100m	11.59	15 Q	11.46	9	did not advance	
Jo Pavey	5000m					14:59.08	Silver medal
Julie Pratt	100m hurdles	13.49	8 Q			13.48	6
Nicola Sanders	400m hurdles	55.76	4 Q			55.32	4
Jemma Simpson	800m	2:03.49	5 Q	2:01.78	8 Q	2:01.11	6
Laura Turner	100m	11.43	4 Q	11.38	4 Q	11.46	4
Kimberly Wall	400m	53.05	13 Q	53.75	19	did not advance	
Shelley Woods	800m EAD (T54)					1:58.92	7
Mara Yamauchi	10000m					31:49.40	Bronze medal
Hayley Yelling	10000m					32:32.38	6
Liz Yelling	Marathon					2:32:19	Bronze medal
Nwnyika Onoura; Kimberly Wall; Laura Turner; Emma Ania	4 × 100 m relay					43.43	Silver medal
Christine Ohuruogu; Nicola Sanders; Natasha Danvers-Smith; Kimberly Wall	4 × 400 m relay					DSQ	–

- Q : Qualified for next round
- DNF : Did not finish
- DNS : Did not start
- DSQ : Disqualified
- EAD (T54) : Events for athletes with a disability (wheelchair racing category)

Field

Athlete	Events	Qualification		Final	
Athlete	Events	Result	Rank	Result	Rank
Julia Bennett	High Jump			1.78	9
Kate Dennison	Pole Vault	4.00	4 Q	4.15	7
Zoe Derham	Hammer			61.92	5
Joanne Duncan	Shot Put			16.42	8
Julie Dunkley	Shot Put			15.98	10
Shelley Holroyd	Javelin			49.46	10
Jade Johnston	Long Jump	6.52	3	6.55	5
Susan Moncrieff	High Jump			1.83	6
Kara Nwidobie	Discus			50.18	12
Michelle Robinson	Hammer			12.80	7
Goldie Sayers	Javelin			57.29	5
Lorainne Shaw	Hammer			66.00	Bronze medal
Claire Smithson	Discus			54.34	8
Ellie Spain	Pole Vault	3.90	12 Q	4.00	11
Nadia Williams	Triple Jump			13.42	Bronze medal

Combined events

Athlete	Event	Final			
Athlete	Event	Discipline	Result	Points	Rank
Kelly Sotherton	Heptathlon	100m hurdles	13.29	1081	2
Kelly Sotherton	Heptathlon	High Jump	1.85	1041	2
Kelly Sotherton	Heptathlon	Shot Put	13.74	777	2
Kelly Sotherton	Heptathlon	200m	23.56	1023	2
Kelly Sotherton	Heptathlon	Long Jump	6.51	1010	2
Kelly Sotherton	Heptathlon	Javelin	32.04	515	11
Kelly Sotherton	Heptathlon	800m	2:11.08	949	4
Kelly Sotherton	Heptathlon	Overall	–	6396	Gold medal

Athlete	Event	Final			
Athlete	Event	Discipline	Result	Points	Rank
Jessica Ennis	Heptathlon	100m hurdles	13.32	1077	3
Jessica Ennis	Heptathlon	High Jump	1.91	1119	1
Jessica Ennis	Heptathlon	Shot Put	11.87	653	8
Jessica Ennis	Heptathlon	200m	23.80	1000	3
Jessica Ennis	Heptathlon	Long Jump	6.15	896	5
Jessica Ennis	Heptathlon	Javelin	36.39	598	9
Jessica Ennis	Heptathlon	800m	2:12.66	926	5
Jessica Ennis	Heptathlon	Overall	–	6269	Bronze medal

Athlete	Event	Final			
Athlete	Event	Discipline	Result	Points	Rank
Julie Hollman	Heptathlon	100m hurdles	13.85	1000	6
Julie Hollman	Heptathlon	High Jump	1.82	1003	4
Julie Hollman	Heptathlon	Shot Put	11.63	637	10
Julie Hollman	Heptathlon	200m	24.82	903	6
Julie Hollman	Heptathlon	Long Jump	6.15	896	5
Julie Hollman	Heptathlon	Javelin	42.80	721	4
Julie Hollman	Heptathlon	800m	2:19.09	836	8
Julie Hollman	Heptathlon	Overall	–	6002	6

== Badminton ==
Singles and Doubles events

Athlete	Event	Round of 64	Round of 32	Round of 16	Quarterfinals	Semifinals	Final	
Athlete	Event	Opposition Result	Opposition Result	Opposition Result	Opposition Result	Opposition Result	Opposition Result	Rank
Aamir Ghaffar	Men's singles	bye	Pantin (TRI); W 2–0	Tan Wei Kiat (SIN); W 2–0	Karunaratne (SRI); W 2–0	Lee (MAS); L 0–2	Anand (IND); L 1–2	–
Tracey Hallam	Women's singles	bye	Nabawesi (UGA); W 2–0	Morgan (WAL); W 2–0	Hindley (NZL); W 2–0	Cann; W 2–0	Wong (MAS); W 2–0	Gold medal
Anthony Clark / Robert Blair	Men's Doubles		bye	Pantin / Seepaul (TRI); W 2–0	Shirley/Moody (NZL); W 2–0	Wong / Choong (MAS); L 2–0	Brehaut / Denney (AUS); W 2–0	Bronze medal
Joanne Nicholas / Ella Tripp	Women's Doubles		bye	Murgunde / Nehwal (IND); L 1–2	did not advance			-
Gail Emms / Donna Kellogg	Women's Doubles		bye	Lucas / Wilson-Smith (AUS); W 2–0	Gutta / Kurian (IND); W 2–0	Jiang / Li (SIN); L 2–0	Murgunde / Nehwal (IND); W 2–0	Bronze medal
Simon Archer / Ella Tripp	Mixed Doubles	Vaughan / Morgan (WAL); W 2–0	Brehaut / Carroll (AUS); W 2–0	Milroy / Sun (CAN); L 1–2	did not advance			-
Gail Emms / Nathan Robertson	Mixed Doubles	bye	Wong / Ooi (MAS); W 2–0	Cooper / Shirley (NZL); W 2–0	Bowman / Miller (SCO); W 2–0	Saputra / Li (SIN); W 2–1	Shirley / Runesten Petersen (NZL); W 2–0	Gold medal

Mixed Team Event

Team	Event	Round	Opponent	Men's Singles	Men's Doubles	Women's Singles	Women's Doubles	Mixed Doubles	Overall
England	Mixed Team	Pool Match 1	India	Aamir Ghaffar; 2–1; Chetan Anand	Clark / Blair; 2–0; Kumar / Thomas	Tracey Hallam; 2–1; Lalji Popat	Emms / Kellogg; 2–0; Gutta / Kurian	Emms / Robertson; 2–0; Diji / Gutta	Won; 5–0
England	Mixed Team	Pool Match 2	Seychelles	Aamir Ghaffar; 2–0; Georgie Cupidon	Clark / Blair; 2–0; Malcouzane / Cupidon	Tracey Hallam; 2–0; Juliette Ah-Wan	Nicholas / Tripp; 2–0; Course / Ah-Wan	Emms / Robertson; 2–0; Course / Malcouzane	Won; 5–0
England	Mixed Team	Pool Match 3	Trinidad and Tobago	Aamir Ghaffar; 2–0; Darron Charles	Clark / Blair; 2–0; Pantin / Seepaul	Tracey Hallam; 2–0; Nekeisha Blake	Emms / Kellogg; 2–0; Blake / Quan Chee	Archer/Tripp; 2–0; Quan Chee / Seepaul	Won; 5–0
England	Mixed Team	Quarter Final	Canada	Simon Archer; 0–2; Bobby Milroy	Clark / Blair; 2–1; Beres / Milroy	Tracey Hallam; 2–0; Charmaine Reid	Nicholas / Kellogg; 2–0; Loker / Sun	n/a	Won; 3–1
England	Mixed Team	Semi Final	India	Aamir Ghaffar; 0–2; Anup Sridhar	Clark / Blair; 2–0; Kumar / Thomas	Tracey Hallam; 0–2; Saina Nehwal	Emms / Kellogg; 2–0; Gutta / Kurian	Emms / Robertson; 2–0; Murgunde / Diji	Won; 3–2
England	Mixed Team	Final	Malaysia	Aamir Ghaffar; 0–2; Lee Chong Wei	Clark / Blair; 0–2; Chan / Koo	Tracey Hallam; 1–2; Wong Mew Choo	n/a	Emms / Robertson; 2–0; Wong / Ooi	Lost; 1–3

== Basketball ==
Team	Events	Group Stage			Semifinal	Final	Rank
Team	Events	Opposition	Opposition	Opposition	Opposition	Opposition	Rank
England: Joe Donaghey; John Amaechi; Ronnie Baker; Andrew Bridge; Steven Bucknall; Fab Flournoy; Jermaine Forbes; Delme Herriman; Julius Joseph; Mike Martin; Robert Reed; Andrew Sullivan; Richard Windle	Men's Basketball	Barbados; W 75–59	New Zealand; L 63–84	South Africa; W 95–53	Australia; L 75–101	Nigeria; W 95–53	Bronze medal
England: Rosalee Mason; Claire Maytham; Sally Kaznica; Kristy Lavin; Caroline Ayres; Louise Gamman; Jo Sarjant; Andrea Congreaves; Shelly Boston; Katie Crowley; Gillian D'Hondt; Jane Thackray	Women's Basketball	Australia; L 43–95	India; W 146–46	Mozambique; W 104–26	New Zealand; L 67–74	Nigeria; W 78–75	Bronze medal

=== Men's tournament ===
Pool Classification

Team	Wins	Losses
New Zealand	3	0
England	2	1
Barbados	1	2
South Africa	0	3

Pool Matches

Pool B

16 March 2006

England	75–59	Barbados
Scoring by quarter: 14–13, 21–16, 11–23, 39–7

Melbourne, Australia

18 March 2006

England	63–84	New Zealand
Scoring by quarter: 17–18, 12–21, 11–18, 23–27

Melbourne, Australia

20 March 2006

England	95–53	South Africa
Scoring by quarter: 22–14, 25–12, 22–12, 26–15

Melbourne, Australia

Knockout Matches

Semifinal

3 March 2006

England	75–101	Australia
Scoring by quarter: 23–27, 23–23, 12–27, 17–24

Melbourne, Australia

Bronze Medal Match

3 March 2006

England	90–57	Nigeria
Scoring by quarter: 15–15, 30–12, 222–15, 13–15

Melbourne, Australia

=== Women's tournament ===
Pool Classification

Team	Wins	Losses
Australia	3	0
England	2	1
India	1	2
Mozambique	0	3

Pool Matches

Pool B

16 March 2006

England	43–95	Australia
Scoring by quarter: 17–21, 11–26, 8–22, 7–26

Melbourne, Australia

18 March 2006

England	84–46	Mozambique
Scoring by quarter: 22–16, 22–6, 20–11, 20–13

Melbourne, Australia

20 March 2006

England	104–57	India
Scoring by quarter: 25–19, 38–16, 11–6, 30–16

Melbourne, Australia

Knockout Matches

Semifinal

21 March 2006

England	67–74	New Zealand
Scoring by quarter: 13–19, 16–19, 23–23, 15–13

Melbourne, Australia

Bronze Medal Match

23 March 2006

England	78–75	Nigeria
Scoring by quarter: 16–17, 20–13, 19–16, 23–29

Melbourne, Australia

== Boxing ==
Athlete	Event	Round of 32	Round of 16	Quarterfinals	Semifinals	Final	
Athlete	Event	Opposition Result	Opposition Result	Opposition Result	Opposition Result	Opposition Result	Rank
Darran Langley	48 kg	bye	(India) Mayengbam; W 20–12	(Malaysia) Zamzai; W 26–23	(Wales) Nasir; W 19–13	(Namibia) Uutoni; L 24–37	Silver medal
Don Broadhurst	51 kg	bye	(Australia) Hore; W 26–18	(Northern Ireland) Lindberg; W 36–27	(India) Kumar; W 31–26	(South Africa) Chauke; W RSC R3	Gold medal
Nick MacDonald	54 kg	bye	(South Africa) Mahlangu; L 11–19	did not advance			-
Stephen Smith	57 kg	bye	(Ghana) Neequaye; W RSC R3	(India) Prasad; W RET R3	(Wales) Edwards; W 29–15	(Pakistan) Mehrullah; W 20–10	Gold medal
Frankie Gavin	60 kg	(Cyprus) Bobirnat; W 16–5	(India) Bhagwan; W 20–8	(Nigeria) Lawal; W RSC R3	(Australia) Zappavigna; W RSC R3	(Mauritius) Frontin; W 23–9	Gold medal
James Russan	64 kg	(Cyprus) Christodoulou; W 22–10	(Botswana) Nkabiti; W RSC R2	(Australia) Kidd; W 33–26	(Wales) Crees; W RET R1	(Lesotho) Kopo; W WO	Gold medal
Neil Perkins	69 kg	(Ghana) Saragu; W 13–7	(Canada) Trupish; W 23–13	(Northern Ireland) Hamill; W 36–19	(India) Vijender; L 14–22	did not advance	Bronze medal
James Degale	75 kg	(Fiji) Naivaqa; W RSC R1	(New Zealand) Benson; W RSC R2	(Kenya) Shisia; W 24–11	(Australia) Fletcher; L 13–17	did not advance	Bronze medal
Tony Jeffries	81 kg	(Samoa) Wulf; RSC R1	(South Africa) Mohale; RSC R2	(Scotland) Anderson; L 12–17	did not advance		-
Danny Price	91 kg		(Australia) Pitt; L 12–16	did not advance			-
David Price	91+ kg		(Fiji) Rasaubale; W RSC R1	(New Zealand) Weenink; W RSC R2	(India) Johnson; W RSC R4	(Wales) Evans; W RSC R3	Gold medal

- RSC : referee stopped contest
- RET : retired (hurt)
- WO : walkover

== Cycling ==
=== Road ===
Athlete	Event	Time	Rank
Steve Cummings	Men's Time Trial	52:10.58	14
Steve Cummings	Men's Road Racel	4:05:34	4
Paul Manning	Men's Time Trial	51:42.85	9
Paul Manning	Men's Road Race	DNF	-
Stuart Dangerfield	Men's Time Trial	50:57.00	6
Wendy Houvenaghel	Women's Time Trial	39:46.02	6
Wendy Houvenaghel	Women's Road Race	2:59:32	14
Rachel Heale	Women's Time Trial	39:36.37	5
Rachel Heale	Women's Road Race	2:59:13	5
Amy Hunt	Women's Road Race	2:59:29	8
Charlotte Goldsmith	Women's Road Race	2:59:32	12
Nikki Harris	Women's Road Race	2:59:32	13
Emma Jones	Women's Road Race	3:01:40	21
Russell Downing	Men's Road Race	4:21:05	32
Ian Stannard	Men's Road Race	DNF	-
Chris Newton	Men's Road Race	DNF	-
Robin Sharman	Men's Road Race	DNF	-

- DNF : did not finish

=== Track ===
Athlete	Event	Qualification		Last 16		Quarterfinal		Semifinal		Final	
Athlete	Event	Result	Rank	Result	Rank	Result	Rank	Result	Rank	Result	Rank
Paul Manning	Men's Individual Pursuit	4:21.801	1 QG							(England) Hayles – 4:21.801; W – 0.036s	Gold medal
Rob Hayles	Men's Individual Pursuit	4:21.837	2 QG							(England) Manning – 4:21.837; L + 0.036s	Silver medal
Rob Hayles	Men's Scratch Race	-	5 Q							DSQ	24
Steve Cummings	Men's Individual Pursuit	4:25.570	4 QB							(New Zealand) Allen – 4:24.767; W – 5.552s	Bronze medal
Jason Queally	Men's 1000m time trial									1:01.849	Silver medal
Victoria Pendleton	Women's 500m time trial									34.662	Silver medal
Victoria Pendleton	Women's Sprint	11.275	1 Q	(Scotland) Kate Cullen; W	1 Q			(Australia) Elisabeth Williams; W 2–0	1 QG	(Australia) Anna Meares; W 2–1	Gold medal
Jamie Staff	Men's keirin	–	2 QG	–	5	did not advance					
Matthew Crampton	Men's keirin	–	5	did not advance							
Matthew Crampton	Men's Sprint	10.307	2 Q	(New Zealand) Nathan Seddon; W	1 Q	(Jamaica) Ricardo Lynch; W	1 Q	(Australia) Ryan Bayley; L 0–2	2 QB	(Canada) Travis Smith; L 0–2	4
Emma Jones	Women's Points Race									4 pts	7
Emma Jones	Women's Individual Pursuit	3:38.791	3 QB							(New Zealand) Shanks – 3:40.057; W – 0.819s	Bronze medal
Wendy Houvenaghel	Women's Individual Pursuit	DSQ	-							did not advance	
Nikki Harris	Women's Points Race									3 pts	8
Ian Stannard	Men's Points Race	27 pts	3 QG							0 pts	18
Ian Stannard	Men's Scratch race	=	13							did not advance	
Andy Tennant	Men's Points Race	7 pts	7 QG							43 pts	10
Edward Clancy	Men's Points Race	5 pts	10 QG							66 pts	7
Edward Clancy	Men's Scratch Racce	-	4 QG							DNS	-
England; Steve Cummings; Rob Hayles; Paul Manning; Chris Newtown	Men's Team Pursuit	4:05.248	1 QG							Australia; Ashley Hutchinson; Matthew Goss; Stephen Wooldridge; 4:02.699; W – 2.795	Gold medal
England; Jason Queally; Jamie Staff; Matthew Crampton	Men's Team Sprint	44.564	2 QG							Scotland; Ross Edgar; Chris Hoy; Craig MacLean; 44.309; L + 0.027	Silver medal

- QG – qualified for Gold Final
- QB – qualified for Bronze Final

=== Mountain bike ===
Athlete	Event	Time	Rank
Oli Beckingsale	Men's mountain bike	2:13:26	Silver medal
Liam Killeen	Men's mountain bike	2:13:11	Gold medal
Simon Richardson	Men's mountain bike	2:23:44	12
Amy Hunt	Women's mountain bike	2:01:33	4

== Diving ==
Men

Athlete	Event	Preliminary Set	Final Set	Total Score	
Athlete	Event	Preliminary Set	Final Set	Score	Rank
Peter Waterfield	Men's 1m Springboard	369.35	382.45	751.80	4
Ben Swain	Men's 1m Springboard	357.70	353.65	711.35	6
Gareth Jones	Men's 1m Springboard	317.55	289.95	607.50	10

- 1 m: Ben Swain, Peter Waterfield
- 3 m: Ben Swain, Tony Ally
- 10 m: Peter Waterfield, Gareth Jones, Leon Taylor
- 3 m synchro: Tony Ally/Mark Shipman
- 10 m synchro: Callum Johnstone/Gary Hunt, Peter Waterfield/Leon Taylor

Women

- 1 m: Tandi Indergaard
- 3 m: Rebecca Gallentree, Hayley Sage, Tandi Indergaard
- 10 m: Sarah Barrow, Stacie Powell, Tonia Couch
- 3 m Synchro: Tandi Indergaard/Hayley Sage
- 10 m Synchro: Stacie Powell/Tonia Couch, Brooke Graddon/Sarah Barrow

== Field hockey ==
=== Men's tournament ===
- Richard Alexander
- Jon Bleby
- Jonty Clarke
- Scott Cordon
- Matt Daly
- Jon Ebsworth
- James Fair
- Brett Garrard
- Ben Hawes
- Martin Jones
- Glenn Kirkham
- Simon Mantell
- Ben Marsden
- Barry Middleton
- Rob Moore
- James Tindall

Head coach: Jason Lee

=== Women's tournament ===
- Jennie Bimson
- Melanie Clewlow
- Crista Cullen
- Alex Danson
- Becky Duggan
- Joanne Ellis
- Cathy Gilliat-Smith
- Helen Grant
- Charlotte Hartley
- Beckie Herbert
- Carolyn Reid
- Helen Richardson
- Chloe Rogers
- Beth Storry
- Kate Walsh
- Rachel Walsh
- Lisa Wooding
- Lucilla Wright

Head coach: Danny Kerry

== Gymnastics ==
=== Artistic ===
Men

- Ryan Bradley
- Ross Brewer
- Luke Folwell
- Louis Smith
- Kristian Thomas

Women

- Beth Tweddle (Team captain, withdrew due to injury)
- Imogen Cairns
- Shavahn Church
- Hannah Clowes
- Becky Downie

=== Rhythmic ===
- Hannah Chappell
- Rachel Ennis
- Heather Mann

== Lawn bowls ==
Men

- Mark Bantock
- Ian Bond
- Stephen Farish
- Mervyn King
- Robert Newman
- Andy Thomson

Women

- Jean Baker
- Ellen Falkner
- Susan Harriott
- Katherine Hawes
- Amy Monkhouse
- Catherine Popple

== Netball ==
England finished third in the netball at the 2006 Commonwealth Games. In the bronze medal match, they defeated Jamaica 53–52.

Pool 1

Friday 17 March; 18:30 (UTC+11)	Report; Stats	England	63–47	Malawi	Umpires: Stacey Campton; Bronwyn Meek; Reserve umpire: Carolene Logan
Friday 17 March; 18:30 (UTC+11)	Report; Stats	Scoring by quarter: 20-11, 16-13, 14-12, 13-11			Umpires: Stacey Campton; Bronwyn Meek; Reserve umpire: Carolene Logan
Friday 17 March; 18:30 (UTC+11)	Report; Stats	Rachel Dunn 23/33 (70%); Louisa Brownfield 19/28 (68%); Pamela Cookey 13/14 (93%); Abby Teare 8/12 (67%)		Linda Magombo 34/41 (83%); Mary Waya 11/17 (65%); Annie Mopiha 1/1 (100%); Peace Chawinga 1/1 (100%)	Umpires: Stacey Campton; Bronwyn Meek; Reserve umpire: Carolene Logan

Saturday 18 March; 13:00 (UTC+11)	Report; Stats	England	60–41	Fiji	Umpires: Chris Campbell; Bronwyn Meek; Reserve umpire: Christine Robinson
Saturday 18 March; 13:00 (UTC+11)	Report; Stats	Scoring by quarter: 18-9, 15-9, 10-14, 17-9			Umpires: Chris Campbell; Bronwyn Meek; Reserve umpire: Christine Robinson
Saturday 18 March; 13:00 (UTC+11)	Report; Stats	Rachel Dunn 30/36 (83%); Pamela Cookey 24/35 (69%); Abby Teare 6/9 (67%)		Matelita Shaw 24/30 (80%); Taraima Rara 17/23 (74%)	Umpires: Chris Campbell; Bronwyn Meek; Reserve umpire: Christine Robinson

Monday 20 March; 18:30 (UTC+11)	Report; Stats	England	78–18	Saint Vincent and the Grenadines	Umpires: Stacey Campton; Amanda Nottingham; Reserve umpire: Carolene Logan
Monday 20 March; 18:30 (UTC+11)	Report; Stats	Scoring by quarter: 20-6, 23-3, 19-6, 16-3			Umpires: Stacey Campton; Amanda Nottingham; Reserve umpire: Carolene Logan
Monday 20 March; 18:30 (UTC+11)	Report; Stats	Louisa Brownfield 26/30 (87%); Abby Teare 16/20 (80%); Rachel Dunn 14/15 (93%); Pamela Cookey 13/17 (76%); Ama Agbeze 9/17 (53%)		Samathea Christopher 14/19 (74%); Nicole Sandy 2/5 (40%); Galeine Gordon 2/7 (29%)	Umpires: Stacey Campton; Amanda Nottingham; Reserve umpire: Carolene Logan

Wednesday 22 March; 20:30 (UTC+11)	Report; Stats	New Zealand	55–40	England	Umpires: Sharon Kelly; Chris Campbell; Reserve umpire: Jacqui Jashari
Wednesday 22 March; 20:30 (UTC+11)	Report; Stats	Scoring by quarter: 15-9, 12-12, 15-10, 13-9			Umpires: Sharon Kelly; Chris Campbell; Reserve umpire: Jacqui Jashari
Wednesday 22 March; 20:30 (UTC+11)	Report; Stats	Irene van Dyk 46/49 (94%); Belinda Colling 9/12 (75%)		Louisa Brownfield 17/18 (94%); Pamela Cookey 14/20 (70%); Abby Teare 5/9 (56%); Rachel Dunn 4/5 (80%)	Umpires: Sharon Kelly; Chris Campbell; Reserve umpire: Jacqui Jashari

Thursday 23 March; 19:00 (UTC+11)	Report; Stats	South Africa	35–67	England	Umpires: Pauline Sciascia; Michelle Phippard; Reserve umpire: Stacey Campton
Thursday 23 March; 19:00 (UTC+11)	Report; Stats	Scoring by quarter: 8-17, 13-12, 8-18, 6-20			Umpires: Pauline Sciascia; Michelle Phippard; Reserve umpire: Stacey Campton
Thursday 23 March; 19:00 (UTC+11)	Report; Stats	Sindisiwe Gumede 27/33 (82%); Christine Markgraaff 6/9 (67%); Lizanne Helmand 2/7 (29%)		Louisa Brownfield 47/53 (89%); Abby Teare 12/17 (71%); Pamela Cookey 8/10 (80%)	Umpires: Pauline Sciascia; Michelle Phippard; Reserve umpire: Stacey Campton

Table

Pos	Team	P	W	D	L	GF	GA	GD	Pts
1	New Zealand	5	5	0	0	374	173	+201	10
2	England	5	4	0	1	308	196	+112	8
3	Malawi	5	3	0	2	262	282	-20	6
4	South Africa	5	2	0	3	264	283	-19	4
5	Fiji	5	1	0	4	228	293	-65	2
6	Saint Vincent and the Grenadines	5	0	0	5	171	380	-209	0

Qualified for Semi-finals
Qualified for Classification

Semi-final

Saturday 25 March; 20:30 (UTC+11	Report; Stats	Australia	52–40	England	Umpires: Amanda Nottingham; Chris Campbell; Reserve umpire: Bronwyn Meek
Saturday 25 March; 20:30 (UTC+11	Report; Stats	Scoring by quarter: 14-8, 11-9, 10-7, 17-16			Umpires: Amanda Nottingham; Chris Campbell; Reserve umpire: Bronwyn Meek
Saturday 25 March; 20:30 (UTC+11	Report; Stats	Sharelle McMahon 27/31 (87%); Susan Pratley 15/18 (83%); Catherine Cox 10/14 (71%)		Abby Teare 15/24 (63%); Louisa Brownfield 9/14 (64%); Pamela Cookey 9/15 (60%); Rachel Dunn 7/11 (64%)	Umpires: Amanda Nottingham; Chris Campbell; Reserve umpire: Bronwyn Meek

Bronze medal match

Sunday 26 March; 14:00 (UTC+11)	Stats	Jamaica	52–53	England	Umpires: Sharon Kelly; Amanda Nottingham; Reserve umpire: Michelle Phippard
Sunday 26 March; 14:00 (UTC+11)	Stats	Scoring by quarter: 18-10, 11-12, 11-16, 12-15			Umpires: Sharon Kelly; Amanda Nottingham; Reserve umpire: Michelle Phippard
Sunday 26 March; 14:00 (UTC+11)	Stats	Elaine Davis 46/52 (88%); Simone Forbes 6/9 (67%)		Abby Teare 30/36 (83%); Pamela Cookey 17/29 (59%); Rachel Dunn 6/10 (60%)	Umpires: Sharon Kelly; Amanda Nottingham; Reserve umpire: Michelle Phippard

Squad

England roster
Players
Coaches

Name	Pos	DOB	Height	Club	Nat	Caps
Ama Agbeze	GD, GK, WD	12 November 1982 (aged 23)	1.84 m (6 ft 0 in)	Loughborough Lightning
Karen Atkinson	WA, C	7 June 1978 (aged 27)	1.68 m (5 ft 6 in)	Loughborough Lightning
Louisa Brownfield	GA, GS	14 April 1984 (aged 21)	1.91 m (6 ft 3 in)	Hertfordshire Mavericks
Jade Clarke	WD, C, WA	17 October 1983 (aged 27)	1.74 m (5 ft 9 in)	Loughborough Lightning
Pamela Cookey	GA, GS, WA	2 September 1984 (aged 21)	1.78 m (5 ft 10 in)	Team Bath
Rachel Dunn	GS, GA	14 November 1982 (aged 23)	1.87 m (6 ft 2 in)	Team Bath
Chioma Ezeogu	WA	12 March 1981 (aged 25)	1.74 m (5 ft 9 in)	Brunel Hurricanes
Geva Mentor	GK, GD	17 September 1984 (aged 21)	1.88 m (6 ft 2 in)	Team Bath
Sonia Mkoloma	GD, GK	17 January 1979 (aged 27)	1.86 m (6 ft 1 in)	Brunel Hurricanes
Olivia Murphy (c)	C, WA	24 April 1977 (aged 28)	1.74 m (5 ft 9 in)	Loughborough Lightning
Naomi Stenhouse	WD, GD	2 April 1975 (aged 30)	1.82 m (6 ft 0 in)	Hertfordshire Mavericks
Abby Teare	GA, GS	25 May 1977 (aged 28)	1.81 m (5 ft 11 in)	Brunel Hurricanes

Head coach

- Margaret Caldow

Assistant coach

- Maggie Jackson

Notes

- (c) – Captain
- (cc) – Co-captain
- (vc) – Vice-captain
- – Injury / maternity leave
- (TRP) – Temporary Replacement Player

== Rugby sevens ==
- Simon Amor (Captain)
- Danny Care
- Ben Gollings
- Richard Haughton
- Magnus Lund
- Nils Mordt
- Henry Paul
- Ben Russell
- David Seymour
- Mathew Tait
- Tom Varndell
- Andy Vilk

== Shooting ==
Men

- Clay target:
- Skeet: Richard Brickell, Clive Bramley
- Trap: Christopher Dean, Edward Ling
- Double trap: Richard Faulds, Steve Walton
- Pistol:
- 10 m air pistol: Mick Gault, Nick Baxter
- 25 m centre fire: Peter Flippant, Simon Lucas
- 25 m standard pistol: Mick Gault, Simon Lucas
- 50 m pistol: Mick Gault, Nick Baxter
- Small bore rifle:
- 10 m: air rifle: Chris Hector, Chris Lacey
- 50 m rifle 3 positions: Chris Hector, Jason Burrage
- 50 m: rifle prone: Mike Babb, Chris Hector

Women

- Clay Target:
- Skeet: Elena Little, Pinky Le Grelle
- Trap: Lesley Goddard
- Double trap: Charlotte Kerwood, Rachel Parish
- Pistol:
- 10 m air pistol: Georgina Geikie, Julia Lydall
- 25 m sports pistol: Georgina Geikie, Julia Lydall
- Small bore rifle:
- 10 m air rifle: Louise Minett, Becky Spicer
- 50 m rifle 3 positions: Louise Minett, Becky Spicer
- 50 m rifle prone: Sharon Lee, Helen Spittles

Open

- Full Bore: Queens Prize: Glyn Barnett, Parag Patel

== Squash ==
Men

Athlete	Events
Lee Beachill	singles, doubles
Adrian Grant	mixed doubles
Nick Matthew	singles, doubles
Peter Nicol	singles, doubles
James Willstrop	singles, doubles, mixed doubles

Women

Athlete	Events
Tania Bailey	singles, doubles
Vicky Botwright	singles, doubles, mixed doubles
Jenny Duncalf	singles, doubles
Linda Elriani	singles
Alison Waters	doubles, mixed doubles

== Swimming ==
Men

- Matthew Bowe
- Simon Burnett
- Matthew Clay
- Chris Cook
- Chris Cozens
- Ross Davenport
- Mark Foster
- James Gibson
- Anthony Howard
- Darren Mew
- Dean Milwain
- Alex Scotcher
- Liam Tancock
- Matt Walker EAD

Women

- Julia Beckett
- Rosalind Brett
- Rebecca Cooke
- Terri Dunning
- Francesca Halsall
- Kate Haywood
- Joanne Jackson
- Melanie Marshall
- Keri-anne Payne
- Kate Richardson
- Katy Sexton
- Amy Smith

== Synchronised swimming ==
- Olivia Allison
- Jenna Randall
- Lauren Smith

== Table tennis ==
Men

- Andrew Baggaley
- Alan Cooke
- Paul Drinkhall
- Andrew Rushton
- Sean Sweeting
- Jack Donohoe

Women

- Helen Lower
- Joanna Parker
- Kelly Sibley
- Georgina Walker
- Sue Gilroy EAD
- Cathy Mitton EAD
- Jane Campbell EAD
- Catherine Perry
- Michael Barrett

Team	Event	Pool Matches						Q'Final	5–8 Match	5–6 Match	Rank
Team	Event	Match 1	Match 2	Match 3	Match 4	Match 5	Match 6	Q'Final	5–8 Match	5–6 Match	Rank
England	Men's Team	Kenya; W 3–0	Wales; L 2–3	Guyana; W 3–0	Pakistan; W 3–0	Sri Lanka; W 3–0	Tuvalu; W 3–0	Nigeria; L 1–3	Canada; W 3–0	Australia; W 3–0	5
England	Men's Team	Paul Drinkhall; 3–0; Fahd Daim	Paul Drinkhall; 0–3; Adam Robertson	Paul Drinkhall; 3–0; Godfrey Munroe	Paul Drinkhall; 3–0; Farjad Saif	Paul Drinkhall; 3–0; Gihan Liyanage	Paul Drinkhall; 3–0; Napetari Tioti	Paul Drinkhall; 2–3; Monday Merotohun	Paul Drinkhall; 3–1; Pradeeban Peter-Paul	Paul Drinkhall; 3–0; Russ Lavale	5
England	Men's Team	Andrew Baggaley; 3–0; Moses Kamau	Andrew Baggaley; 3–0; Stephen Jenkins	Alan Cooke; 3–0; Idi Lewis	Andrew Baggaley; 3–1; Kashif Razzaq	Andrew Baggaley; 3–0; Pitiyage Silva	Andrew Baggaley; 3–0; Alan Resture	Andrew Baggaley; 1–3; Sequn Toriola	Andrew Baggaley; 3–1; Faazil Kassam	Andrew Baggaley; 3–1; Trevor Brown	5
England	Men's Team	Andrew Rushton; 3–0; Victor Ougu	Alan Cooke; 3–0; Ryan Jenkins	Andrew Rushton; 3–0; Paul David	Alan Cooke; 3–1; Muhammed Qureshi	Andrew Rushton; 3–0; Thilina Piyadasa	Andrew Rushton; 3–0; Teokila Maleko	Alan Cooke; 3–1; Kazeen Nasiru	Andrew Rushton; 3–1; Bence Csaba	Andrew Rushton; 3–0; David Zalcberg	5
England	Men's Team	n/a	Paul Drinkhall; 1–3; Ryan Jenkins	n/a	n/a	n/a	n/a	Alan Cooke; 2–3; Sequn Toriola	n/a	n/a	5
England	Men's Team	n/a	Alan Cooke; 2–3; Adam Robertson	n/a	n/a	n/a	n/a	n/a	n/a	n/a	5

Men's Team Event

Pool C

Team	Wins	Losses
Wales	6	0
England	5	1
Guyana	3	3
Sri Lanka	3	3
Pakistan	3	3
Kenya	1	5
Tuvalu	0	6

Women's Team Event

Pool B

Team	Wins	Losses
Australia	4	0
Nigeria	3	1
England	2	2
Sri Lanka	1	3
Vanuatu	0	4

- England are eliminated at the pool stage.

== Triathlon ==
Men

Athlete	Event	1500m Swim	40 km Cycle	10 km Run	Total Time	Rank
Stuart Hayes	Individual	17:48.16	1:01:03.35	32:01.67	1:50:53.18	9
Will Clarke	Individual	17:47.16	1:01:04.97	31:50.85	1:50:42.98	7
Tim Don	Individual	17:43.17	1:01:08.51	30:46.39	1:49:38.07	4

Women

Athlete	Event	1500m Swim	40 km Cycle	10 km Run	Total Time	Rank
Liz Blatchford	Individual	18:24.44	1:05:46.36	35:19.61	1:59:30.41	6
Julie Dibens	Individual	18:20.42	1:05:50.43	36:51.31	2:01:02.16	10
Andrea Whitcombe	Individual	18:33.15	1:05:39.37	35:59.28	2:00:11.80	7

== Weightlifting ==
Men

Athlete	Event	Weights Lifted		Total Lifted	Rank
Athlete	Event	Snatch	Clean & Jerk	Total Lifted	Rank
Kamran Panjavi	62 kg	118 kg	no lift	n/a	–
Gurbinder Cheema	105 kg	152 kg	178 kg	330 kg	4

Men – EAD (Powerlifting)

Athlete	Event	Weights Lifted	Factored Weight	Rank
Jason Irving	Open EAD	167.5 kg	180.8 kg	Silver medal
Anthony Peddle	Open EAD	130.0 kg	156.7 kg	11

Women

Athlete	Event	Weights Lifted		Total Lifted	Rank
Athlete	Event	Snatch	Clean & Jerk	Total Lifted	Rank
Jo Calvino	48 kg	64 kg	83 kg	147 kg	4
Jo Sevastio	58 kg	63 kg	80 kg	143 kg	8
Annette Campbell	63 kg	75 kg	87 kg	162 kg	6
