= Swimming at the 2006 Commonwealth Games – Men's 100 metre breaststroke =

Men's 100 metre Breaststroke at the 2006 Commonwealth Games
- Venue: Melbourne Sports and Aquatic Centre
- Dates: 17 March (heats, semifinals); 18 March (final)
- Competitors: 33 from 21 nations
- Winning time: 1:00.98

Medalists
gold medal	Chris Cook	England
silver medal	James Gibson	England
bronze medal	Brenton Rickard	Australia

== Men's 100 m Breaststroke - Final ==
Pos.	Lane	Athlete	R.T.	50 m	100 m	Tbh.
	4	(England) Chris Cook (ENG)	0.77	28.62; 28.62	1:00.98; 32.36	
	2	(England) James Gibson (ENG)	0.78	28.31; 28.31	1:01.10; 32.79	0.12
	5	(Australia) Brenton Rickard (AUS)	0.83	28.20; 28.20	1:01.17; 32.97	0.19
4	6	(England) Darren Mew (ENG)	0.76	28.40; 28.40	1:01.23; 32.83	0.25
5	3	(Canada) Scott Dickens (CAN)	0.75	28.67; 28.67	1:01.51; 32.84	0.53
6	1	(Australia) Christian Sprenger (AUS)	0.80	28.99; 28.99	1:01.99; 33.00	1.01
7	7	(Canada) Mike Brown (CAN)	0.78	29.39; 29.39	1:02.27; 32.88	1.29
8	8	(Scotland) Kristopher Gilchrist (SCO)	0.82	29.20; 29.20	1:02.43; 33.23	1.45

== Men's 100 m Breaststroke - Semifinals ==
=== Men's 100 m Breaststroke - Semifinal 01 ===
Pos.	Lane	Athlete	R.T.	50 m	100 m	Tbh.
1	5	(Canada) Scott Dickens (CAN)	0.77	28.82; 28.82	1:01.69; 32.87	
2	3	(England) James Gibson (ENG)	0.77	28.38; 28.38	1:01.76; 33.38	0.07
3	4	(Australia) Christian Sprenger (AUS)	0.79	28.33; 28.33	1:02.28; 33.95	0.59
4	6	(Scotland) Kristopher Gilchrist (SCO)	0.92	29.59; 29.59	1:02.76; 33.17	1.07
5	8	(South Africa) Neil Versfeld (RSA)	0.66	29.76; 29.76	1:03.44; 33.68	1.75
6	2	(Northern Ireland) Andrew Bree (NIR)	0.74	29.54; 29.54	1:03.56; 34.02	1.87
7	7	(New Zealand) Glenn Snyders (NZL)	0.78	29.48; 29.48	1:03.74; 34.26	2.05
8	1	(New Zealand) Dean Kent (NZL)	0.77	29.70; 29.70	1:04.10; 34.40	2.41

=== Men's 100 m Breaststroke - Semifinal 02 ===
Pos.	Lane	Athlete	R.T.	50 m	100 m	Tbh.
1	6	(England) Chris Cook (ENG)	0.77	28.57; 28.57	1:00.94 (GR); 32.37	
2	4	(Australia) Brenton Rickard (AUS)	0.85	28.43; 28.43	1:01.40; 32.97	0.46
3	3	(England) Darren Mew (ENG)	0.78	28.44; 28.44	1:01.73; 33.29	0.79
4	5	(Canada) Mike Brown (CAN)	0.82	29.31; 29.31	1:01.90; 32.59	0.96
5	7	(Canada) Mathieu Bois (CAN)	0.85	29.62; 29.62	1:02.92; 33.30	1.98
6	8	(Barbados) Bradley Ally (BAR)	0.74	29.71; 29.71	1:03.38; 33.67	2.44
7	1	(Scotland) Ross Clark (SCO)	0.87	29.72; 29.72	1:03.42; 33.70	2.48
DSQ	2	(Australia) Jim Piper (AUS)				

== Men's 100 m Breaststroke - Heats ==
=== Men's 100 m Breaststroke - Heat 01 ===
Pos.	Lane	Athlete	R.T.	50 m	100 m	Tbh.
1	4	(Maldives) Hassan Ashraf (MDV)	0.71	35.64; 35.64	1:18.79; 43.15	
2	5	(Uganda) Max Kanyerezi (UGA)	1.01	39.47; 39.47	1:28.18; 48.71	9.39
DNS	3	(Guyana) Onan Thom (GUY)				

=== Men's 100 m Breaststroke - Heat 02 ===
Pos.	Lane	Athlete	R.T.	50 m	100 m	Tbh.
1	5	(Kenya) Amar Shah (KEN)	0.83	31.54; 31.54	1:08.70; 37.16	
2	4	(Gibraltar) Jamie Zammitt (GIB)	0.80	31.99; 31.99	1:09.07; 37.08	0.37
3	6	(Cayman Islands) Andrew Mackay (CAY)	0.67	33.06; 33.06	1:10.10; 37.04	1.40
4	2	(Sri Lanka) Conrad Francis (SRI)	0.82	32.14; 32.14	1:10.17; 38.03	1.47
5	3	(Pakistan) Mehmood Nasir (PAK)	0.98	33.64; 33.64	1:11.93; 38.29	3.23
6	7	(Uganda) Mugula Mugambi (UGA)	0.78	36.75; 36.75	1:25.09; 48.34	16.39

=== Men's 100 m Breaststroke - Heat 03 ===
Pos.	Lane	Athlete	R.T.	50 m	100 m	Tbh.
1	4	(Australia) Christian Sprenger (AUS)	0.80	29.30; 29.30	1:01.90; 32.60	
2	5	(Canada) Mike Brown (CAN)	0.80	29.48; 29.48	1:01.99; 32.51	0.09
3	3	(Canada) Mathieu Bois (CAN)	0.78	29.90; 29.90	1:03.64; 33.74	1.74
4	2	(Scotland) Ross Clark (SCO)	0.92	29.63; 29.63	1:03.97; 34.34	2.07
5	6	(New Zealand) Dean Kent (NZL)	0.76	29.71; 29.71	1:04.13; 34.42	2.23
6	7	(Northern Ireland) Jonathan Nixon (NIR)	0.82	30.20; 30.20	1:05.19; 34.99	3.29
7	1	(Singapore) Jin Wen Tan (SIN)	0.80	31.54; 31.54	1:07.14; 35.60	5.24
8	8	(Isle of Man) Adam Jackson (IOM)	0.87	33.09; 33.09	1:10.80; 37.71	8.90

=== Men's 100 m Breaststroke - Heat 04 ===
Pos.	Lane	Athlete	R.T.	50 m	100 m	Tbh.
1	3	(Canada) Scott Dickens (CAN)	0.77	29.50; 29.50	1:02.32; 32.82	
2	5	(England) James Gibson (ENG)	0.80	29.00; 29.00	1:02.55; 33.55	0.23
3	4	(England) Chris Cook (ENG)	0.78	29.42; 29.42	1:02.59; 33.17	0.27
4	2	(Northern Ireland) Andrew Bree (NIR)	0.76	29.34; 29.34	1:03.12; 33.78	0.80
5	7	(Barbados) Bradley Ally (BAR)	0.71	30.03; 30.03	1:04.23; 34.20	1.91
6	6	(South Africa) Neil Versfeld (RSA)	0.68	29.68; 29.68	1:04.43; 34.75	2.11
7	1	(Barbados) Andrei Cross (BAR)	0.76	29.97; 29.97	1:05.72; 35.75	3.40
8	8	(Zambia) Chisela Kanchela (ZAM)	0.71	32.18; 32.18	1:09.73; 37.55	7.41

=== Men's 100 m Breaststroke - Heat 05 ===
Pos.	Lane	Athlete	R.T.	50 m	100 m	Tbh.
1	4	(Australia) Brenton Rickard (AUS)	0.83	28.34; 28.34	1:01.28; 32.94	
2	5	(England) Darren Mew (ENG)	0.80	29.11; 29.11	1:02.34; 33.23	1.06
3	6	(Scotland) Kristopher Gilchrist (SCO)	0.93	29.42; 29.42	1:02.76; 33.34	1.48
4	3	(Australia) Jim Piper (AUS)	0.83	29.30; 29.30	1:02.79; 33.49	1.51
5	7	(New Zealand) Glenn Snyders (NZL)	0.80	29.76; 29.76	1:03.90; 34.14	2.62
6	2	(South Africa) Thabang Moeketsane (RSA)	0.75	30.11; 30.11	1:04.47; 34.36	3.19
7	1	(India) Puneet Rana (IND)	0.83	30.78; 30.78	1:06.51; 35.73	5.23
DNS	8	(Bermuda) Graham Smith (BER)				
