= Swimming at the 2006 Commonwealth Games – Men's 50 metre breaststroke =

== Men's 50 m Breaststroke - Final ==
Pos.	Lane	Athlete	R.T.	50 m	Tbh.
	7	(England) Chris Cook (ENG)	0.73	28.01	
	5	(England) Darren Mew (ENG)	0.82	28.07	0.06
	4	(Australia) Brenton Rickard (AUS)	0.86	28.14	0.13
4	6	(England) James Gibson (ENG)	0.77	28.18	0.17
5	3	(Canada) Scott Dickens (CAN)	0.74	28.34	0.33
6	2	(Australia) Christian Sprenger (AUS)	0.79	28.62	0.61
7	1	(Scotland) Ross Clark (SCO)	0.84	28.93	0.92
8	8	(Scotland) Chris Jones (SCO)	0.83	29.19	1.18

== Men's 50 m Breaststroke - Semifinals ==
=== Men's 50 m Breaststroke - Semifinal 01 ===
Pos.	Lane	Athlete	R.T.	50 m	Tbh.
1	4	(England) Darren Mew (ENG)	0.79	28.14	
2	3	(England) James Gibson (ENG)	0.82	28.40	0.26
3	5	(England) Chris Cook (ENG)	0.79	28.56	0.42
4	1	(Scotland) Chris Jones (SCO)	0.80	29.04	0.90
5	6	(New Zealand) Glenn Snyders (NZL)	0.79	29.27	1.13
6	2	(Barbados) Andrei Cross (BAR)	0.73	29.37	1.23
7	7	(Northern Ireland) Jonathan Nixon (NIR)	0.79	29.49	1.35
8	8	(Canada) Mathieu Bois (CAN)	0.77	29.75	1.61

=== Men's 50 m Breaststroke - Semifinal 02 ===
Pos.	Lane	Athlete	R.T.	50 m	Tbh.
1	4	(Australia) Brenton Rickard (AUS)	0.87	28.13	
2	3	(Canada) Scott Dickens (CAN)	0.78	28.33	0.20
3	5	(Australia) Christian Sprenger (AUS)	0.81	28.49	0.36
4	2	(Scotland) Ross Clark (SCO)	0.86	28.95	0.82
5	6	(Northern Ireland) Andrew Bree (NIR)	0.70	29.22	1.09
6	7	(Wales) Stuart Manford (WAL)	0.82	29.41	1.28
7	1	(South Africa) Thabang Moeketsane (RSA)	0.77	29.53	1.40
8	8	(Scotland) Robert Lee (SCO)	0.87	29.93	1.80

== Men's 50 m Breaststroke - Heats ==
=== Men's 50 m Breaststroke - Heat 01 ===
Pos.	Lane	Athlete	R.T.	50 m	Tbh.
1	7	(Guyana) Onan Thom (GUY)	0.73	31.64	
2	4	(Pakistan) Mehmood Nasir (PAK)	0.99	32.44	0.80
3	3	(Guernsey) Jeremy Osborne (GUE)	0.87	33.01	1.37
4	5	(Uganda) Mugula Mugambi (UGA)	0.80	35.79	4.15
5	6	(Maldives) Hassan Ashraf (MDV)	0.68	36.52	4.88
6	2	(Uganda) Max Kanyerezi (UGA)	0.88	39.23	7.59

=== Men's 50 m Breaststroke - Heat 02 ===
Pos.	Lane	Athlete	R.T.	50 m	Tbh.
1	5	(Canada) Scott Dickens (CAN)	0.75	28.59	
2	4	(England) James Gibson (ENG)	0.80	28.65	0.06
3	3	(New Zealand) Glenn Snyders (NZL)	0.80	29.21	0.62
4	6	(Scotland) Chris Jones (SCO)	0.82	29.82	1.23
5	2	(Scotland) Robert Lee (SCO)	0.90	29.83	1.24
6	7	(Singapore) Jin Wen Tan (SIN)	0.75	30.47	1.88
7	1	(Kenya) Amar Shah (KEN)	0.79	30.84	2.25
8	8	(Gibraltar) Jamie Zammitt (GIB)	0.84	31.62	3.03

=== Men's 50 m Breaststroke - Heat 03 ===
Pos.	Lane	Athlete	R.T.	50 m	Tbh.
1	4	(Australia) Brenton Rickard (AUS)	0.85	28.19	
2	5	(Australia) Christian Sprenger (AUS)	0.78	28.39	0.20
3	7	(Northern Ireland) Andrew Bree (NIR)	0.74	29.19	1.00
4	6	(Scotland) Ross Clark (SCO)	0.86	29.21	1.02
5	1	(Barbados) Andrei Cross (BAR)	0.75	29.24	1.05
6	3	(Wales) Stuart Manford (WAL)	0.80	29.39	1.20
7	2	(Canada) Mathieu Bois (CAN)	0.80	30.10	1.91
8	8	(Sri Lanka) Conrad Francis (SRI)	0.81	31.37	3.18

=== Men's 50 m Breaststroke - Heat 04 ===
Pos.	Lane	Athlete	R.T.	50 m	Tbh.
1	5	(England) Darren Mew (ENG)	0.79	28.21	
2	4	(England) Chris Cook (ENG)	0.76	28.45	0.24
3	2	(Northern Ireland) Jonathan Nixon (NIR)	0.77	29.72	1.51
4	6	(South Africa) Thabang Moeketsane (RSA)	0.76	29.80	1.59
5	1	(Zambia) Chisela Kanchela (ZAM)	0.69	30.67	2.46
6	7	(India) Sahl Rana (IND)	0.81	30.93	2.72
7	8	(Isle of Man) Adam Jackson (IOM)	0.84	33.04	4.83
DNS	3	(Canada) Mike Brown (CAN)			
