= Swimming at the 2008 Summer Olympics – Men's 200 metre breaststroke =

Men's 200 metre breaststroke at the Games of the XXIX Olympiad
- Venue: Beijing National Aquatics Center
- Date: August 12, 2008 (heats); August 13, 2008 (semifinals); August 14, 2008 (final)
- Competitors: 53 from 39 nations
- Winning time: 2:07.64 OR

Medalists
1st place, gold medalist(s)		Kosuke Kitajima	Japan
2nd place, silver medalist(s)		Brenton Rickard	Australia
3rd place, bronze medalist(s)		Hugues Duboscq	France

The men's 200 metre breaststroke event at the 2008 Olympic Games took place on 12–14 August at the Beijing National Aquatics Center in Beijing, China.

Japan's Kosuke Kitajima blasted a new Olympic record of 2:07.64 to strike another breaststroke double, and to defend his title in the event. He registered a straightforward triumph over Brenton Rickard, who earned a silver medal in an Australian record of 2:08.88. France's Hugues Duboscq added a second bronze and third overall to his collection in 2:08.94, finishing just ahead of Canada's Mike Brown by almost a tenth of a second (0.10) with a time of 2:09.03.

Hungary's Dániel Gyurta, silver medalist in Athens four years earlier, finished outside the medals in fifth place at 2:09.22. Earlier in the prelims, he established an Olympic record by winning the final of seven heats in 2:08.68.

U.S. swimmer Scott Spann turned in another sub-2:10 barrier to earn a sixth spot in 2:09.76. Italian tandem Loris Facci (2:10.57) and Paolo Bossini (2:11.48) closed out the field. Bossini set a new Olympic record of 2:08.98 to shave 0.46 seconds off Kitajima's mark in Athens, until Gyurta took three-tenths of a second (0.30) off the record time a few minutes later.

Notable swimmers failed to reach the top 8 final, featuring American Eric Shanteau, who entered the Games while battling testicular cancer, and Kazakhstan's Vladislav Polyakov, who finished fifth in Athens four years earlier. Norway's Alexander Dale Oen, silver medalist in the 100 m breaststroke, placed seventeenth in 2:11.30, but missed the semifinals by 0.11 seconds.

== Records ==
Prior to this competition, the existing world and Olympic records were as follows.

World record	Kosuke Kitajima (JPN)	2:07.51	Tokyo, Japan	8 June 2008	
Olympic record	Kosuke Kitajima (JPN)	2:09.44	Athens, Greece	18 August 2004	-

The following new world and Olympic records were set during this competition.

Date	Event	Name	Nationality	Time	Record
August 12	Heat 5	Paolo Bossini	Italy	2:08.98	OR
August 12	Heat 7	Dániel Gyurta	Hungary	2:08.68	OR
August 13	Semifinal 1	Kosuke Kitajima	Japan	2:08.61	OR
August 14	Final	Kosuke Kitajima	Japan	2:07.64	OR

== Results ==
=== Heats ===
Rank	Heat	Lane	Name	Nationality	Time	Notes
1	7	6	Dániel Gyurta	Hungary	2:08.68	Q, OR, EU
2	5	2	Paolo Bossini	Italy	2:08.98	Q
3	7	2	Loris Facci	Italy	2:09.12	Q
4	7	5	Hugues Duboscq	France	2:09.42	Q
5	6	6	Mike Brown	Canada	2:09.84	Q
6	7	4	Kosuke Kitajima	Japan	2:09.89	Q
7	6	3	Eric Shanteau	United States	2:10.29	Q
8	6	2	William Diering	South Africa	2:10.39	Q, AF
9	6	7	Neil Versfeld	South Africa	2:10.50	Q
10	5	5	Scott Spann	United States	2:10.61	Q
11	7	7	Vladislav Polyakov	Kazakhstan	2:10.83	Q
12	4	7	Andrew Bree	Ireland	2:10.91	Q
13	6	4	Brenton Rickard	Australia	2:11.00	Q
14	7	1	Igor Borysik	Ukraine	2:11.08	Q
15	5	3	Kristopher Gilchrist	Great Britain	2:11.13	Q
16	4	6	Glenn Snyders	New Zealand	2:11.19	Q
17	6	5	Alexander Dale Oen	Norway	2:11.30	
17	7	3	Yuta Suenaga	Japan	2:11.30	
19	3	3	Thiago Pereira	Brazil	2:11.40	
20	3	5	Tom Be'eri	Israel	2:11.44	NR
21	4	1	Hunor Mate	Austria	2:11.56	
22	7	8	Valeriy Dymo	Ukraine	2:11.65	
23	5	4	Grigory Falko	Russia	2:11.88	
24	5	8	Mihail Alexandrov	Bulgaria	2:11.94	NR
25	4	5	Yevgeniy Ryzhkov	Kazakhstan	2:12.44	
26	5	6	Christian Sprenger	Australia	2:12.56	
27	3	4	Melquíades Álvarez	Spain	2:12.59	
28	4	8	Julien Nicolardot	France	2:12.76	
29	5	1	Mathieu Bois	Canada	2:12.87	
30	6	1	Henrique Barbosa	Brazil	2:12.99	
31	1	4	Edvinas Dautartas	Lithuania	2:13.11	
32	2	4	Carlos Almeida	Portugal	2:13.34	
33	6	8	Chris Christensen	Denmark	2:13.92	
34	4	3	Sergio García	Spain	2:14.30	
35	4	2	Maxim Podoprigora	Austria	2:14.43	
36	1	6	Sandeep Sejwal	India	2:15.24	
37	4	4	James Kirton	Great Britain	2:15.25	
38	2	3	Jakob Jóhann Sveinsson	Iceland	2:15.58	
39	3	2	Jiří Jedlička	Czech Republic	2:15.79	
40	2	8	Laurent Carnol	Luxembourg	2:15.87	
41	3	8	Romanos Alyfantis	Greece	2:16.04	
42	3	7	Sofiane Daid	Algeria	2:16.15	
43	2	5	Shin Su-jong	South Korea	2:16.21	
44	3	6	Lai Zhongjian	China	2:16.28	
45	5	7	Alexey Zinovyev	Russia	2:16.40	
46	2	6	Martti Aljand	Estonia	2:16.52	
47	2	2	Miguel Molina	Philippines	2:16.94	
48	3	1	Robin van Aggele	Netherlands	2:17.14	
49	2	1	Wang Wei-wen	Chinese Taipei	2:17.20	
50	1	2	Leopoldo Andara	Venezuela	2:17.77	NR
51	1	5	Ömer Aslanoglu	Turkey	2:17.93	
52	1	3	Sergio Andres Ferreyra	Argentina	2:20.10	
	2	7	Valentin Preda	Romania	DNS	

=== Semifinals ===
==== Semifinal 1 ====
Rank	Lane	Name	Nationality	Time	Notes
1	3	Kosuke Kitajima	Japan	2:08.61	Q, OR
2	2	Scott Spann	United States	2:09.08	Q
3	4	Paolo Bossini	Italy	2:09.95	Q
4	5	Hugues Duboscq	France	2:09.97	Q
5	7	Andrew Bree	Ireland	2:10.16	NR
6	6	William Diering	South Africa	2:10.21	
7	1	Igor Borysik	Ukraine	2:10.99	
8	8	Glenn Snyders	New Zealand	2:12.07	

==== Semifinal 2 ====
Rank	Lane	Name	Nationality	Time	Notes
1	3	Mike Brown	Canada	2:08.84	Q, NR
2	1	Brenton Rickard	Australia	2:09.72	Q
3	4	Dániel Gyurta	Hungary	2:09.73	Q
4	5	Loris Facci	Italy	2:09.75	Q
5	3	Neil Versfeld	South Africa	2:10.06	AF
6	6	Eric Shanteau	United States	2:10.10	
7	8	Kristopher Gilchrist	Great Britain	2:10.27	NR
8	7	Vladislav Polyakov	Kazakhstan	2:11.87	

=== Final ===
Rank	Lane	Name	Nationality	Time	Notes
1st place, gold medalist(s)	4	Kosuke Kitajima	Japan	2:07.64	OR
2nd place, silver medalist(s)	6	Brenton Rickard	Australia	2:08.88	OC
3rd place, bronze medalist(s)	8	Hugues Duboscq	France	2:08.94	NR
4	5	Mike Brown	Canada	2:09.03	
5	2	Dániel Gyurta	Hungary	2:09.22	
6	3	Scott Spann	United States	2:09.76	
7	7	Loris Facci	Italy	2:10.57	
8	1	Paolo Bossini	Italy	2:11.48	
