= Swimming at the 2010 Commonwealth Games – Men's 200 metre breaststroke =

The Men's 200 metre breaststroke event at the 2010 Commonwealth Games took place on 9 October 2010, at the SPM Swimming Pool Complex.

Three heats were held. The heat in which a swimmer competed did not formally matter for advancement, as the swimmers with the top eight times from the entire field qualified for the finals.

== Heats ==
=== Heat 1 ===
Rank	Lane	Name	Nationality	Time	Notes
1	3	Robert Holderness	Wales	2:13.97	Q
2	5	Scott Dickens	Canada	2:15.42	
3	4	Richard Webb	England	2:16.83	
4	6	Sandeep Sejwal	India	2:17.13	
5	2	Ian Black	Jersey	2:25.02	

=== Heat 2 ===
Rank	Lane	Name	Nationality	Time	Notes
1	4	Michael Jamieson	Scotland	2:12.83	Q
2	3	Andrew Willis	England	2:13.42	Q
3	5	Craig Calder	Australia	2:14.01	Q
4	6	Glenn Snyders	New Zealand	2:14.05	Q
5	2	Michael Dawson	Northern Ireland	2:22.77	
6	7	Puneet Rana	India	2:25.58	

=== Heat 3 ===
Rank	Lane	Name	Nationality	Time	Notes
1	5	Kristopher Gilchrist	Scotland	2:12.76	Q
2	3	Christian Sprenger	Australia	2:13.50	Q
3	4	Brenton Rickard	Australia	2:13.91	Q
4	6	Andrew Bree	Northern Ireland	2:16.66	
5	2	See Yap	Malaysia	2:22.01	
6	7	Raymond Edwards	Barbados	2:29.93	

== Final ==
Rank	Lane	Name	Nationality	Time	Notes
1st place, gold medalist(s)	2	Brenton Rickard	Australia	2:10.89	CG
2nd place, silver medalist(s)	5	Michael Jamieson	Scotland	2:10.97	
3rd place, bronze medalist(s)	6	Christian Sprenger	Australia	2:11.44	
4	3	Andrew Willis	England	2:11.49	
5	4	Kristopher Gilchrist	Scotland	2:11.77	
6	7	Robert Holderness	Wales	2:11.85	
7	1	Craig Calder	Australia	2:13.39	
8	8	Glenn Snyders	New Zealand	2:14.42	
