= Swimming at the 2006 Commonwealth Games – Men's 4 × 100 metre medley relay =

Women's Commonwealth Games event

Men's 4 × 100 metre medley relay at the 2006 Commonwealth Games
- Venue: Melbourne Sports and Aquatic Centre
- Dates: 21 March 2006
- Competitors: 47 from 9 nations
- Winning time: 3:34.37

The men's 4 × 100 metre medley relay event at the 2006 Commonwealth Games took place on 21 March at the Melbourne Sports and Aquatic Centre, Australia.

The Australian team of Matthew Welsh, Brenton Rickard, Michael Klim and Eamon Sullivan won gold in Commonwealth Games record time, ahead of England's Liam Tancock, Christopher Cook, Matthew Bowe and Ross Davenport. The Scottish team of Gregor Tait, Kristopher Gilchrist, Todd Cooper and Craig Houston finished third.

== Records ==
Prior to this competition, the existing world and game records were as follows.

World Record	3:30.68	Aaron Peirsol (53.45); Brendan Hansen (59.37); Ian Crocker (50.28); Jason Lezak (47.58)	USA	Athens, Greece	21 August 2004
Games Record	3:36.05	Matt Welsh; Jim Piper; Geoff Huegill; Ian Thorpe	AUS	Manchester, England	4 August 2002

The Commonwealth Games record was broken by Australia in the final.

== Results ==
=== Heats ===
Rank	Heat	Lane	Nation	Swimmers	Time	Notes
1	2	5	Australia	Andrew Lauterstein (55.65); Christian Sprenger (1:02.76); Adam Pine (53.10); Kenrick Monk (49.96)	3:41.47	Q
2	1	5	Canada	Brian Johns (57.35); Scott Dickens (1:02.57); Thomas Kindler (55.31); Yannick Lupien (49.72)	3:44.95	Q
3	1	3	New Zealand	Scott Talbot (58.69); Glenn Snyders (1:03.41); Corney Swanepoel (52.79); Cameron Gibson (51.33)	3:46.22	Q
4	1	4	England	Liam Tancock (57.76); Chris Cook (1:02.28); Matthew Bowe (55.21); Ross Davenport (52.02)	3:47.27	Q
5	2	3	Scotland	Gregor Tait (58.40); Christopher Jones (1:03.29); Todd Cooper (53.88); Craig Houston (52.18)	3:47.75	Q
6	2	4	South Africa	Garth Tune (58.08); Thabang Moeketsane (1:03.47); George du Rand (54.41); Karl Thaning (51.98)	3:47.94	Q
7	2	6	Singapore	Lee Yu Tan (59.04); Jin Wen Tan (1:08.36); Shirong Su (57.64); Zhirong Tay (52.22)	3:57.26	Q
8	1	6	Jersey	Liam du Feu (1:03.04); Daniel Hawksworth (1:09.31); Simon le Couilliard (55.98); Alexis Militis (53.20)	4:01.53	Q
9	2	2	Guernsey	Thomas Hollingsworth (1:00.16); Jeremy Osborne (1:13.16); Ian Powell (55.23); Ian Hubert (54.08)	4:02.63	

=== Final ===
Rank	Lane	Nation	Swimmers	Time	Time behind	Notes
1st place, gold medalist(s)	4	Australia	Matt Welsh (54.84); Brenton Rickard (59.51); Michael Klim (51.87); Eamon Sullivan (48.15)	3:34.37		GR
2nd place, silver medalist(s)	6	England	Liam Tancock (54.42); Chris Cook (1:00.29); Matthew Bowe (52.53); Ross Davenport (49.16)	3:36.40	2.03	
3rd place, bronze medalist(s)	2	Scotland	Gregor Tait (55.15); Kristopher Gilchrist (1:01.83); Todd Cooper (52.85); Craig Houston (49.92)	3:39.75	5.38	
4	5	Canada	Matthew Rose (56.29); Scott Dickens (1:01.32); Thomas Kindler (53.82); Brent Hayden (48.44)	3:39.87	5.50	
5	3	New Zealand	Scott Talbot (55.77); Glenn Snyders (1:02.88); Moss Burmester (52.22); Cameron Gibson (49.88)	3:40.75	6.38	
6	7	South Africa	Gerhard Zandberg (55.81); Roland Schoeman (1:03.24); Ryk Neethling (52.97); Karl Thaning (49.76)	3:41.78	7.41	
7	1	Singapore	Lee Yu Tan (59.20); Jin Wen Tan (1:07.43); Shirong Su (57.51); Zhirong Tay (51.94)	3:56.08	21.71	
8	8	Jersey	Liam du Feu (1:03.20); Daniel Hawksworth (1:08.85); Simon le Couilliard (56.03); Alexis Militis (52.84)	4:00.92	26.55	
