= Swimming at the 2006 Commonwealth Games – Men's 200 metre breaststroke =

The following tables listed the results of Men's 200 metres breaststroke competitions in the 2006 Commonwealth Games.

== Men's 200 m Breaststroke - Final ==
Pos.	Lane	Athlete	R.T.	50 m	100 m	150 m	200 m	Tbh.
	4	(Canada) Mike Brown (CAN)	0.81	30.12; 30.12	1:03.57; 33.45	1:37.68; 34.11	2:12.23 (GR); 34.55	
	3	(Australia) Brenton Rickard (AUS)	0.90	29.49; 29.49	1:03.54; 34.05	1:38.04; 34.50	2:12.24; 34.20	0.01
	5	(Australia) Jim Piper (AUS)	0.88	29.57; 29.57	1:02.72; 33.15	1:36.74; 34.02	2:12.26; 35.52	0.03
4	6	(Scotland) Kristopher Gilchrist (SCO)	0.93	30.08; 30.08	1:03.93; 33.85	1:37.64; 33.71	2:12.79; 35.15	0.56
5	1	(Northern Ireland) Andrew Bree (NIR)	0.81	30.19; 30.19	1:04.49; 34.30	1:39.04; 34.55	2:14.18; 35.14	1.95
6	7	(South Africa) Neil Versfeld (RSA)	0.66	30.56; 30.56	1:04.67; 34.11	1:39.03; 34.36	2:14.79; 35.76	2.56
7	2	(Canada) Mathieu Bois (CAN)	0.79	30.08; 30.08	1:04.16; 34.08	1:40.06; 35.90	2:17.30; 37.24	5.07
8	8	(Australia) Christian Sprenger (AUS)	0.81	30.38; 30.38	1:05.63; 35.25	1:41.68; 36.05	2:19.09; 37.41	6.86
Source: Melbourne 2006 XVIII Commonwealth Games

== Men's 200 m Breaststroke - Heats ==
=== Men's 200 m Breaststroke - Heat 01 ===
Pos.	Lane	Athlete	R.T.	50 m	100 m	150 m	200 m	Tbh.
1	4	(Australia) Brenton Rickard (AUS)	0.88	30.01; 30.01	1:04.61; 34.60	1:40.15; 35.54	2:15.93; 35.78	
2	5	(Canada) Mathieu Bois (CAN)	0.79	30.53; 30.53	1:05.10; 34.57	1:41.00; 35.90	2:16.53; 35.53	0.60
3	3	(Northern Ireland) Andrew Bree (NIR)	0.75	30.46; 30.46	1:04.98; 34.52	1:40.27; 35.29	2:17.45; 37.18	1.52
4	7	(Zambia) Chisela Kanchela (ZAM)	0.71	34.26; 34.26	1:15.27; 41.01	1:58.58; 43.31	2:43.25; 44.67	27.32
DNS	2	(Barbados) Andrei Cross (BAR)						
DNS	6	(New Zealand) Glenn Snyders (NZL)						
Source: Omega Timing

=== Men's 200 m Breaststroke - Heat 02 ===
Pos.	Lane	Athlete	R.T.	50 m	100 m	150 m	200 m	Tbh.
1	4	(Canada) Mike Brown (CAN)	0.77	30.47; 30.47	1:04.55; 34.08	1:39.19; 34.64	2:14.49; 35.30	
2	5	(South Africa) Neil Versfeld (RSA)	0.68	31.42; 31.42	1:06.07; 34.65	1:40.88; 34.81	2:16.73; 35.85	2.24
3	3	(Australia) Christian Sprenger (AUS)	0.82	31.13; 31.13	1:06.45; 35.32	1:42.46; 36.01	2:19.96; 37.50	5.47
4	7	(Pakistan) Mehmood Nasir (PAK)	0.98	35.02; 35.02	1:14.73; 39.71	1:55.29; 40.56	2:36.60; 41.31	22.11
DNS	2	(Bermuda) Graham Smith (BER)						
DNS	6	(Barbados) Bradley Ally (BAR)						
Source: Omega Timing

=== Men's 200 m Breaststroke - Heat 03 ===
Pos.	Lane	Athlete	R.T.	50 m	100 m	150 m	200 m	Tbh.
1	4	(Australia) Jim Piper (AUS)	0.82	30.39; 30.39	1:04.37; 33.98	1:39.42; 35.05	2:15.52; 36.10	
2	5	(Scotland) Kristopher Gilchrist (SCO)	0.88	30.72; 30.72	1:05.56; 34.84	1:40.70; 35.14	2:16.29; 35.59	0.77
3	6	(Scotland) Ross Clark (SCO)	0.87	30.97; 30.97	1:06.69; 35.72	1:43.84; 37.15	2:22.59; 38.75	7.07
4	2	(Singapore) Jin Wen Tan (SIN)	0.77	32.88; 32.88	1:10.17; 37.29	1:48.34; 38.17	2:27.53; 39.19	12.01
5	7	(Kenya) Amar Shah (KEN)	0.81	33.41; 33.41	1:12.66; 39.25	1:52.94; 40.28	2:34.55; 41.61	19.03
DNS	3	(Canada) Scott Dickens (CAN)						
Source: Omega Timing
