= Swimming at the 2006 Commonwealth Games – Women's 4 × 200 metre freestyle relay =

Women's Commonwealth Games event

Women's 4 × 200 metre freestyle relay at the 2006 Commonwealth Games
- Venue: Melbourne Sports and Aquatic Centre
- Dates: March 18, 2006
- Competitors: 28 from 7 nations
- Winning time: 7:56.68

Medalists
gold medal	Libby Lenton; Bronte Barratt; Kelly Stubbins; Linda Mackenzie	Australia
silver medal	Joanne Jackson; Kate Richardson; Julia Beckett; Melanie Marshall	England
bronze medal	Lauren Boyle; Helen Norfolk; Alison Fitch; Melissa Ingram	New Zealand

The women's 4 × 200 metre freestyle relay event at the 2006 Commonwealth Games was held on 18 March 2006, at the Melbourne Sports and Aquatic Centre.

== Records ==
Prior to this competition, the existing world record was as follows.

World record	United States (USA)	7:53.42	Athens, Greece	18 August 2004
Commonwealth record	Australia (AUS)	7:54.06	Montreal, Canada	1 August 2005
Games record	England	8:01.39	Manchester, United Kingdom	1 August 2002

The following records were established during the competition:

Date	Event	Nation	Swimmers	Time	Record
18 March	Final	Australia	Libby Lenton (2:00.04); Bronte Barratt (1:59.14); Kelly Stubbins (1:58.98); Linda Mackenzie (1:58.52)	7:56.68	GR

== Results ==
The final was held at 21:50.

Rank	Lane	Nation	Swimmers	Time	Notes
1st place, gold medalist(s)	4	Australia	Libby Lenton (2:00.04); Bronte Barratt (1:59.14); Kelly Stubbins (1:58.98); Linda Mackenzie (1:58.52)	7:56.68	GR
2nd place, silver medalist(s)	5	England	Joanne Jackson (1:59.12); Kate Richardson (2:01.86); Julia Beckett (2:00.80); Melanie Marshall (1:59.45)	8:01.23	
3rd place, bronze medalist(s)	3	New Zealand	Lauren Boyle (2:00.49); Helen Norfolk (2:00.56); Alison Fitch (2:00.35); Melissa Ingram (2:00.80)	8:02.20	
4	2	Canada	Sophie Simard (2:00.70); Erica Morningstar (2:01.70); Maya Beaudry (1:59.89); Brittany Reimer (1:59.95)	8:02.24	
5	6	South Africa	Leone Vorster (2:04.51); Kirsten van Heerden (2:03.84); Wendy Trott (2:04.31); Marielle Rogers (2:06.77)	8:19.43	
6	7	Wales	Bethan Coole (2:04.80); Julie Gould (2:05.41); Jazmin Carlin (2:05.98); Cari-Fflur Davies (2:06.44)	8:22.63	
7	1	Singapore	Ho Shu Yong (2:11.69); Lynette Ng (2:11.13); Quah Ting Wen (2:10.24); Mylene Ong (2:08.22)	8:41.28	
