= Brenton Rickard =

Australian swimmer

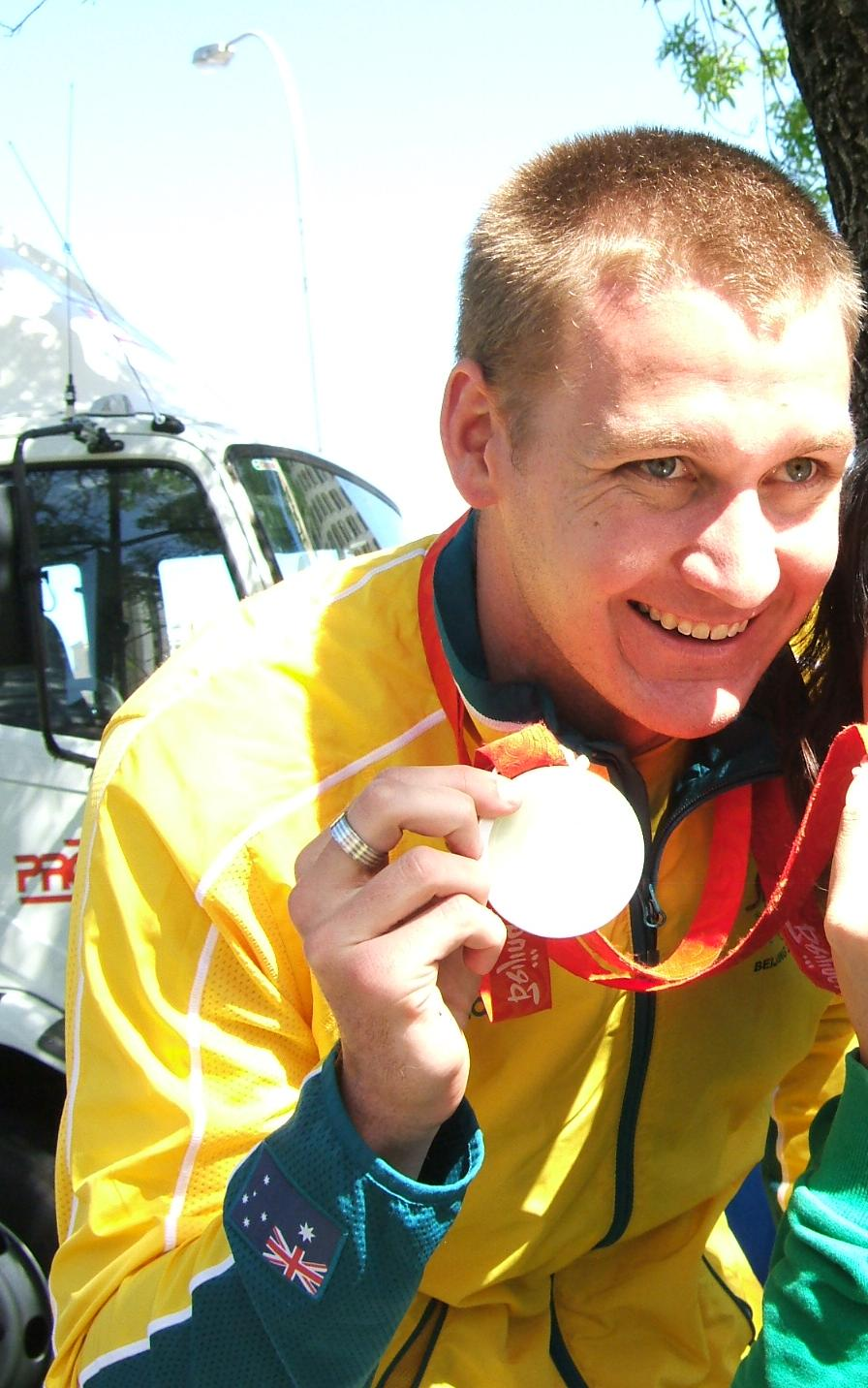

Personal information
- Full name: Brenton Scott Rickard
- National team: Australia
- Born: 19 October 1983 (age 42) Brisbane, Queensland
- Height: 1.90 m (6 ft 3 in)
- Weight: 92 kg (203 lb)

Sport
- Sport: Swimming
- Strokes: Breaststroke
- Club: Brothers
- Coach: Vince Raleigh
Medal record
Men's swimming
Representing Australia
Olympic Games
Silver medal – second place	2008 Beijing	200 m breaststroke
Silver medal – second place	2008 Beijing	4×100 m medley
Bronze medal – third place	2012 London	4×100 m medley
World Championships (LC)
Gold medal – first place	2007 Melbourne	4×100 m medley
Gold medal – first place	2009 Rome	100 m breaststroke
Silver medal – second place	2007 Melbourne	200 m breaststroke
Silver medal – second place	2011 Shanghai	4×100 m medley
Bronze medal – third place	2007 Melbourne	100 m breaststroke
Bronze medal – third place	2009 Rome	4×100 m medley
World Championships (SC)
Gold medal – first place	2006 Shanghai	4×100 m medley
Silver medal – second place	2004 Indianapolis	50 m breaststroke
Silver medal – second place	2004 Indianapolis	100 m breaststroke
Silver medal – second place	2004 Indianapolis	200 m breaststroke
Silver medal – second place	2004 Indianapolis	4×100 m medley
Silver medal – second place	2006 Shanghai	100 m breaststroke
Silver medal – second place	2006 Shanghai	200 m breaststroke
Bronze medal – third place	2010 Dubai	200 m breaststroke
Pan Pacific Championships
Silver medal – second place	2006 Victoria	100 m breaststroke
Silver medal – second place	2010 Irvine	200 m breaststroke
Bronze medal – third place	2006 Victoria	4×100 m medley
Commonwealth Games
Gold medal – first place	2006 Melbourne	4×100 m medley
Gold medal – first place	2010 Delhi	200 m breaststroke
Gold medal – first place	2010 Delhi	4×100 m medley
Silver medal – second place	2006 Melbourne	200 m breaststroke
Silver medal – second place	2010 Delhi	50 m breaststroke
Bronze medal – third place	2006 Melbourne	50 m breaststroke
Bronze medal – third place	2006 Melbourne	100 m breaststroke
Bronze medal – third place	2010 Delhi	100 m breaststroke

Brenton Scott Rickard (born 19 October 1983) is a retired breaststroke swimmer from Australia. He emerged at the international level in 2006, swimming at the Commonwealth games. He has captured multiple Olympic and World Championship medals, as well as world and Commonwealth records. During this period he was coached by Vince Raleigh.

In 2009, he was Australian Institute of Sport Athlete of the Year.

== Olympic Games ==
He arrived in Beijing as a medal contender and a serious threat for the gold medal in all three of his events. He set Australian, Commonwealth and Oceanic records, capturing silver medals in the 200-metre breaststroke and 4×100-metre medley relay, and finished 5th in the 100-metre breaststroke.

- Beijing Olympics in Beijing, China:
  - 200-metre breaststroke.
  - 4×100-metre medley relay.
  - (5th) 100-metre breaststroke.

== FINA World Championships ==
Rickard's first World Championships were a good one, consistently capturing medals in all of his pet events. No Australian records were set, however his status in the world rankings leapfrogged.

- FINA World Championships 2007 in Melbourne, Australia:
  - 200-metre breaststroke.
  - 100-metre breaststroke.
  - 4×100-metre medley relay.

In the final of the 100-metre breaststroke, Rickard won the gold medal and surpassed the old world record of 58.91 held by Kosuke Kitajima with a time of 58.58.

- FINA World Championships 2009 in Rome, Italy:
  - 100-metre breaststroke.
  - 4×100-metre medley relay.
  - (5th) 200-metre breaststroke.

== Career best times ==
Long Course Personal bests
Event	Time	Record
50 m breaststroke	26.95	Former AUS Record Holder
100 m breaststroke	58.58	AUS Record Holder
200 m breaststroke	2:07.89	

Short Course Personal bests
Event	Time	Record
50m Breaststroke	26.62	Former AUS Record Holder
100m Breaststroke	57.79	Former AUS Record Holder
200m Breaststroke	2:04.33	

== Doping allegation ==
In 2020, the IOC began proceedings in the Court of Arbitration of Sport to void Rickard's results from the 2012 London Olympics after his urine samples from that competition tested positive for furosemide, a banned diuretic. If the IOC's findings were upheld, six Australian swimmers would have been stripped of their bronze medal in the 4 × 100 m medley, in which Rickard swam the breaststroke leg of the heat. The proceedings were withdrawn on August 24, 2021.

== See also ==
- List of world records in swimming
- List of Commonwealth records in swimming
- List of Olympic medalists in swimming (men)
- World record progression 100 metres breaststroke

Records
Preceded by Kosuke Kitajima	Men's 100-metre breaststroke world record-holder (long course); 27 July 2009 – 29 July 2012	Succeeded by Cameron van der Burgh
Awards and achievements
Preceded by Ken Wallace and Heath Francis	Australian Athlete of the Year; 2009 (with Emma Moffatt)	Succeeded by Lydia Lassila
