= Alex Scotcher =

Personal information
- Born: Alexander Scotcher; 29 January 1980 (age 46) Aldershot, Hampshire, England
- Height: 188 cm (6 ft 2 in)

Sport
- Sport: Swimming
- Event: Freestyle
Medal record
Representing England
Commonwealth Games
Gold medal – first place	2006 Melbourne	4 × 200 m freestyle
Representing Great Britain
Universiade
Gold medal – first place	2001 Beijing	4 × 100 m freestyle
Gold medal – first place	2003 Daegu	4 × 100 m freestyle
Silver medal – second place	2005 İzmir	4 × 100 m freestyle

Alexander Scotcher (born 29 January 1980) is a British former freestyle swimmer.

An Aldershot-born swimmer, Scotcher attended Loughborough University and was a two-time 4 × 100 m freestyle gold medalist representing Great Britain at the World University Games.

Scotcher swam at the 2003 World Championships in Barcelona.

In 2006, Scotcher won a gold medal with England's 4 × 200 m freestyle team at the Melbourne Commonwealth Games, swimming the second leg of the final. The favourites Australia finished in the bronze medal position and it was the first time since 1950 that they had failed to secure gold in the event.
