= Matt Bowe =

British swimming coach and swimmer

Personal information
- Born: Matthew Bowe; 13 June 1983 (age 43) Barrow, Cumbria, England

Sport
- Country: Great Britain; England
- Sport: Swimming
- Event: Butterfly
Medal record
Commonwealth Games
Representing England
Silver medal – second place	2006 Melbourne	4 × 100 m medley

Matthew Bowe (born 13 June 1983) is a British swimming coach and former butterfly swimmer.

Bowe, raised in the Cumbrian village of Silecroft, was British national champion in the 100 metre butterfly. He swam the butterfly leg in England's silver medal-winning 4 × 100 metre medley relay performance at the 2006 Melbourne Commonwealth Games. In 2007 he represented Great Britain at the World Championships, placing fifth with the medley relay team. He attended Loughborough University and participated in two editions of the World University Games.

Since 2013, Bowe has coached swimming at the collegiate level in the United States, most recently at The University of Michigan, and previously with UC Berkeley, where he is the men's associate head coach. Previously he was a senior associate head coach at Ohio State University.
