= Julia Beckett =

English swimmer (born 1986)

Personal information
- Full name: Julia Kathleen Beckett
- National team: Great Britain
- Born: 4 July 1986 (age 40) Winchester, England
- Height: 1.70 m (5 ft 7 in)
- Weight: 63 kg (139 lb; 9.9 st)

Sport
- Sport: Swimming
- Strokes: Freestyle
- Club: Winchester Penguins
- College team: Loughborough University
Medal record
Women's swimming
Representing Great Britain
World Championships (SC)
Bronze medal – third place	2008 Manchester	4×100 m freestyle
Representing England
Commonwealth Games
Silver medal – second place	2006 Melbourne	4×200 m freestyle

Julia Kathleen Beckett (born 4 July 1986) is an English competitive swimmer who has represented Great Britain in the Olympics and FINA world championships, and England in the Commonwealth Games.

Beckett was born in Winchester, Hampshire, England, and attended Loughborough University.

At the 2006 Commonwealth Games in Melbourne, Australia, she earned a silver medal as part of the runner-up English team in the 4x200-metre freestyle relay, together with teammates Joanne Jackson, Kate Richardson and Melanie Marshall.

Competing for Great Britain in the 2008 FINA Short Course World Championships in Manchester, Beckett won a bronze medal as a member of the third-place British women's team in the 4x100-metre freestyle relay. At the 2008 Summer Olympics hosted by Beijing, China, she swam for the British team in the preliminary heats of the women's 4×100-metre freestyle relay.
