= Dean Milwain =

British swimmer

Personal information
- Full name: Dean Milwain
- National team: Great Britain
- Born: 18 October 1986 (age 40) Derby, England
- Height: 1.88 m (6 ft 2 in)
- Weight: 83 kg (183 lb; 13.1 st)

Sport
- Sport: Swimming
- Strokes: Freestyle
- Club: Loughborough University SC
Medal record
Men's swimming
Representing England
Commonwealth Games
Gold medal – first place	2006 Melbourne	4×200 m freestyle

Dean Milwain (born 18 October 1986) is an English former competitive swimmer who represented Great Britain in the Olympics and England in the Commonwealth Games. At the 2008 Summer Olympics in Beijing, Milwain swam for the British men's team in the individual 400m. He was a member of the English team that won the gold medal in the men's 4x200-metre freestyle relay at the 2006 Commonwealth Games in Melbourne.

Following his success at the Commonwealth Games he was awarded ‘The Keys To The City’ Freedom of the City of Derby.

He was a part of British Swimming's Offshore centre at The Southport School (Queensland Australia) as part of a two year scholarship. During this two year period he won a Bronze Medal at the 2004 European Juniors and captained his School swim team to its first victory in 88 years at the national greater public school championship.

He is now the co-owner of the Sheffield clothing label Skull And Bones Boys Club (SABBC).
