= Darren Mew =

British swimmer

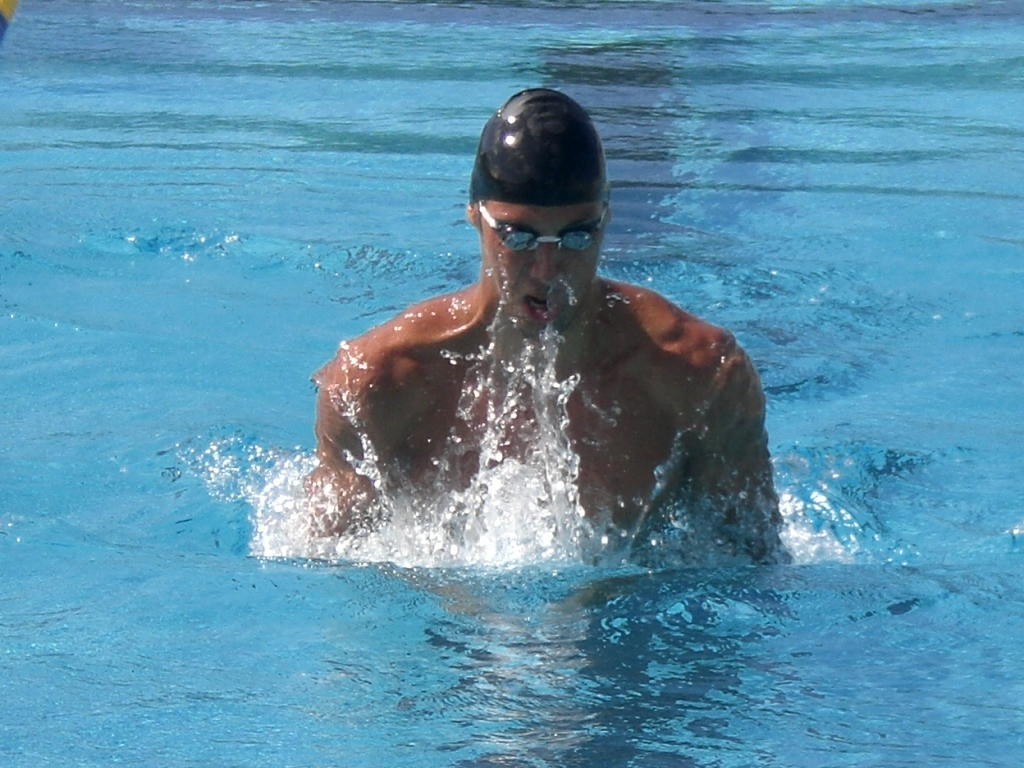
- Darren Mew swimming

Personal information
- Full name: Darren Mew
- Nationality: England
- Born: 12 December 1979 (age 46) Newport, Isle of Wight, England
- Height: 1.93 m (6 ft 4 in)
- Weight: 85 kg (187 lb)

Sport
- Sport: Swimming
- Strokes: breaststroke
- Club: Ellesmere College Titans
- College team: University of Bath
Medal record
Event	1st	2nd	3rd
World Championships (SC)	0	0	2
European Championships (SC)	0	0	6
Commonwealth Games	0	2	2
Universiade	0	0	1
Island Games	2	0	1
Total	2	2	11
Men's swimming
Representing Great Britain
World Championships (SC)
Bronze medal – third place	1999 Hong Kong	4×100 m medley
Bronze medal – third place	2000 Athens	4×100 m medley
European Championships (SC)
Bronze medal – third place	1998 Sheffield	4×50 m medley
Bronze medal – third place	1999 Lisbon	4×50 m medley
Bronze medal – third place	2000 Valencia	100 m breaststroke
Bronze medal – third place	2001 Antwerp	50 m breaststroke
Bronze medal – third place	2003 Dublin	100 m breaststroke
Bronze medal – third place	2006 Helsinki	50 m breaststroke
Universiade
Bronze medal – third place	2007 Bangkok	50 m breaststroke
Representing England
Commonwealth Games
Silver medal – second place	1998 Kuala Lumpur	4×100 m medley
Silver medal – second place	2006 Melbourne	50 m breaststroke
Bronze medal – third place	1998 Kuala Lumpur	100 m breaststroke
Bronze medal – third place	2002 Manchester	50 m breaststroke
Representing Isle of Wight
Island Games
Gold medal – first place	2011 Isle of Wight	50 m breaststroke
Gold medal – first place	2011 Isle of Wight	100 m breaststroke
Bronze medal – third place	2011 Isle of Wight	4×100 m medley

Darren Mew (born 12 December 1979) is a British swimmer specialising in breaststroke. He is a member of Ellesmere College Titans and studied sport as a student at the University of Bath. He has competed in two consecutive Summer Olympics for Great Britain, starting in 2000.

Post Competitive Life

As of April 2022 he is the head coach and founder of SMS (Seven Mile Swimmers) a club base out of the Cayman Island.

== Swimming career ==
Mew was born in Newport, Isle of Wight, and started swimming at West Wight Swimming Club; at 17 he moved to the High Performance Center, then located at the University of Bath. Before he moved Mew competed in three successive European Junior Swimming Championships – 1995 in Geneva, Switzerland, 1996 in Copenhagen, Denmark and 1997 in Glasgow, United Kingdom, winning three medals in total. During this time he also broke the 50, 100 and 200 metre breaststroke long course and 50 and 100 metre breaststroke short course junior British records.

Within six months of his last Junior European Swimming Championships he made his senior debut at the 1998 World Aquatics Championships in Perth, Australia. Later that year he won two medals at the 1998 Commonwealth Games in Kuala Lumpur including a bronze in the 100 m breaststroke.

Mew trained at The Race Club, a summer swim camp founded by Olympic swimmers Gary Hall, Jr. and his father, Gary Hall, Sr. The Race Club, originally known as "The World Team", was designed to serve as a training group for elite swimmers across the world in preparation for the 2000 Sydney Olympic Games. To be able to train with the Race Club, one must either have been ranked in the top 20 in the world the past 3 calendar years or top 3 in their nation in the past year.

Mew has swum in two Olympic finals, the 4 × 100 m medley relay at the 2000 Summer Olympics and the 100 m breaststroke at the 2004 Summer Olympics. Mew ripped the sheafing that keeps the ulnar nerve in place in his left elbow three months before the Athens Olympics leaving him with limited strength in his left arm; this was operated on shortly after he competed at the Games.

He has won two medals at the FINA World Swimming Championships (25 m), four medals at Commonwealth Games six medals at the European Short Course Swimming Championships, and one medal at the 2007 Summer Universiade.

He has broken multiple English, British, and Commonwealth records, and in April 2004 set the fourth fastest 100 metre breaststroke time in world history. From 1997 over the next ten years he had a world ranking inside the top ten in the world in either short course or long course breaststroke swimming.

At the ASA National British Championships he won the 50 metres breaststroke title five times (1998, 2000, 2002, 2003, 2006) and the 100 metres breaststroke title six times (1998, 2000, 2001, 2004, 2005, 2006).

== Charity work ==
In 2000, with a bonus from a sponsor Mew set up the "Darren Mew Trust Fund" to help support sports clubs and teams on the Isle of Wight. The Fund helped support clubs and teams by helping with travel expenses and buying new equipment.

In 2009, Mew was part of the "Champions" project by photographers Anderson & Low to help raise funds for Elton John AIDS Foundation (EJAF). The project which included famous sports people such as Thierry Henry, Matt Dawson, Mark Foster, Billie Jean King and Venus Williams were pictured in the nude. These pictures were made into a book, Champions, and were displayed in the National Portrait Gallery in London.

== Personal bests and records held ==
Event	Long course	Short course
50m Breaststroke	27.44 (2009) ^{NR}	26.72 (2003) ^{NR}
100m Breaststroke	1:00.02 (2004)	58.68 (2003)
200m Breaststroke	2.17.26 (2002)	2.10.83 (2003)
Record Key NR:National Record List of British records in swimming

== See also ==
- List of Commonwealth Games medallists in swimming (men)
