= Matthew Clay (swimmer) =

English swimmer (born 1982)

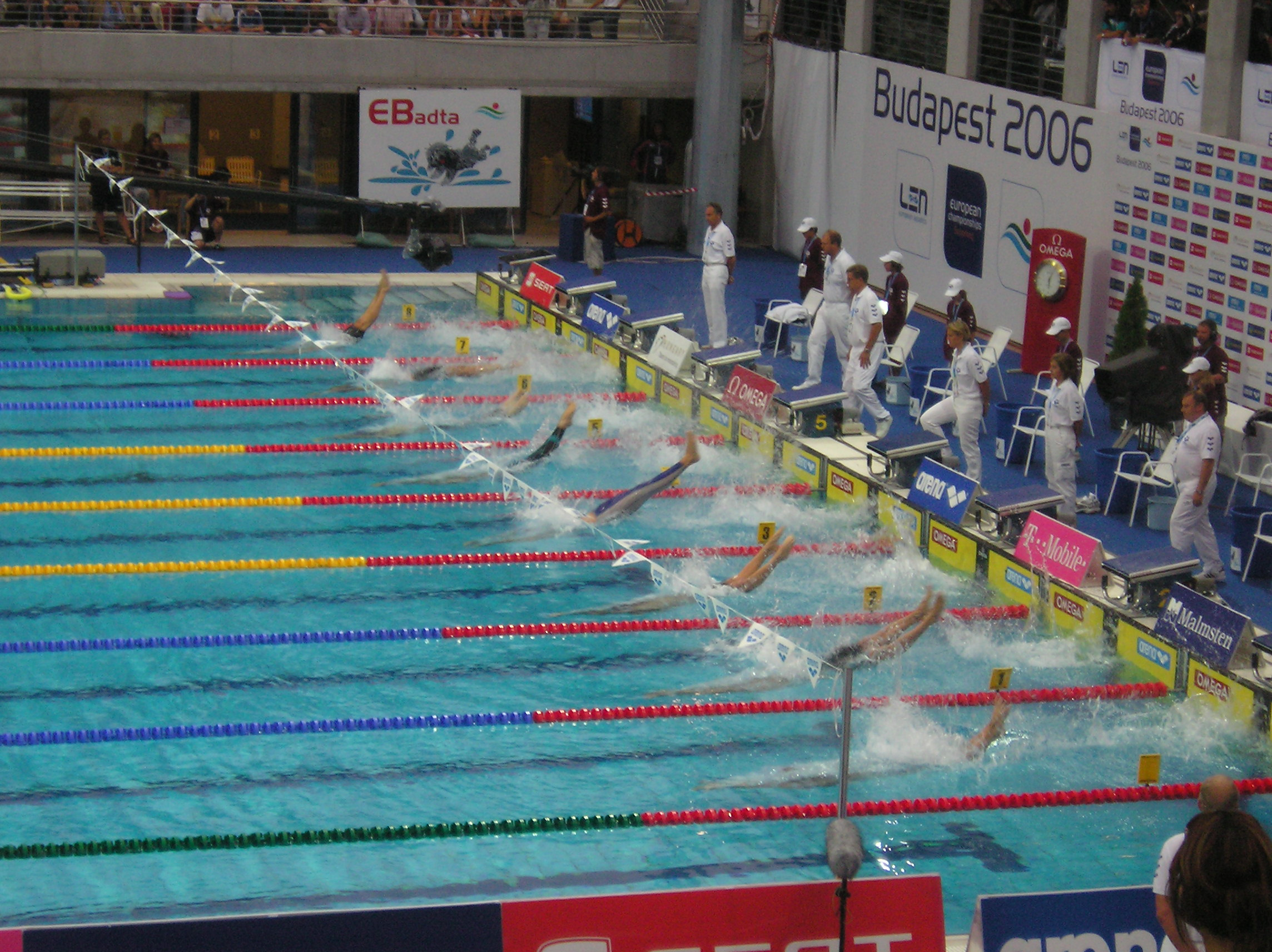
- European Championship (2006)

Personal information
- Nationality: British
- Born: 27 October 1982 (age 43) Nelspruit, South Africa

Sport
- Sport: Swimming
- Strokes: Backstroke
- Club: Swansea Performance
Medal record
Men's swimming
Representing Great Britain
European Championships (LC)
Bronze medal – third place	2006 Budapest	50 m backstroke
European Championships (SC)
Bronze medal – third place	2005 Trieste	4×50 m medley
Representing England
Commonwealth Games
Gold medal – first place	2006 Melbourne	50 m backstroke

Matthew Clay (born 27 October 1982) is an English swimmer best known for winning gold in the men's 50 m backstroke at the 2006 Commonwealth Games in Melbourne.

== See also ==
- List of Commonwealth Games medallists in swimming (men)
