= Melanie Marshall =

British swimmer and swimming coach

Melanie Marshall MBE
Personal information
- Full name: Melanie Jayne Marshall
- Nationality: British
- Born: 12 January 1982 (age 44) Boston, England

Sport
- Sport: Swimming
- Strokes: Freestyle, backstroke
- Club: Loughborough University
Medal record
Women's swimming
Representing Great Britain
World Championships (LC)
Silver medal – second place	2001 Fukuoka	4×100 m freestyle
World Championships (SC)
Silver medal – second place	2008 Manchester	4×200 m freestyle
Bronze medal – third place	2008 Manchester	4×100 m freestyle
European Championships (LC)
Gold medal – first place	2006 Budapest	4×100 m medley
Silver medal – second place	2008 Eindhoven	4×200 m freestyle
Bronze medal – third place	2006 Budapest	200 m backstroke
European Championships (SC)
Gold medal – first place	2003 Dublin	200 m freestyle
Silver medal – second place	2004 Vienna	200 m freestyle
Representing England
Commonwealth Games
Silver medal – second place	2002 Manchester	4×100 m freestyle
Silver medal – second place	2006 Melbourne	200 m backstroke
Silver medal – second place	2006 Melbourne	4×100 m medley
Silver medal – second place	2006 Melbourne	4×100 m freestyle
Silver medal – second place	2006 Melbourne	4×200 m freestyle
Bronze medal – third place	2006 Melbourne	200 m freestyle
Bronze medal – third place	2006 Melbourne	100 m backstroke

Melanie Jayne Marshall MBE (born 12 January 1982) is a former British swimmer. She has won numerous medals for her country as well as being a swimming coach of the year for her work with Adam Peaty in Derby and later Loughborough.

== Early life ==
She was born in Boston, Lincolnshire, brought up in the nearby village of Wrangle. She attended the Giles School in Old Leake.

== Career ==
A long lasting international career started at the 1995 European Youth Olympics in Bath, where she won four gold medals.

Marshall was ranked number one in the world in 2004 after breaking the British 200 m freestyle record to ensure selection to the 2004 Olympic Games in Athens.

At the 2008 Short Course World Championships in Manchester, she came third as part of the British women's 4×100 m freestyle relay team.

Marshall claimed six medals at the 2006 Commonwealth Games in Melbourne, and is currently the second most decorated female athlete ever. Marshall ended her swimming career at the 2008 Olympic Games in Beijing.

She is a three times winner of the ASA National British 100 metres freestyle title (2002, 2004 and 2005), the 400 metres freestyle champion in 2004 and 2005 and the 50 metres backstroke winner in 1998.

On 30 October 2008, Marshall announced her retirement from the sport. She was the head coach at City of Derby Swimming Club, where she first began coaching Commonwealth, European, World and Olympic champion Adam Peaty when he was twelve. In 2014 she was International swim coach of the year. Marshall has also worked as a coach with the British swimming team and has been named as an elite coach by UK Sport. In 2016 Marshall and Peaty both left City of Derby to join the Loughborough National Swimming centre. as lead coach.

In 2018, she was awarded an Honorary Doctorate by Loughborough University.

Marshall was appointed Member of the Order of the British Empire (MBE) in the 2021 Birthday Honours for services to swimming and charity.

In 2025, Marshall relocated to Australia, becoming the head coach of the Griffith University program on the Gold Coast.

== Personal life ==
She currently resides in Loughborough. She is 1.70 m (5 ft 7 in), 62 kg.

== See also ==
- List of World Aquatics Championships medalists in swimming (women)
- List of Commonwealth Games medallists in swimming (women)
