= Ross Davenport =

English swimmer (born 1984)

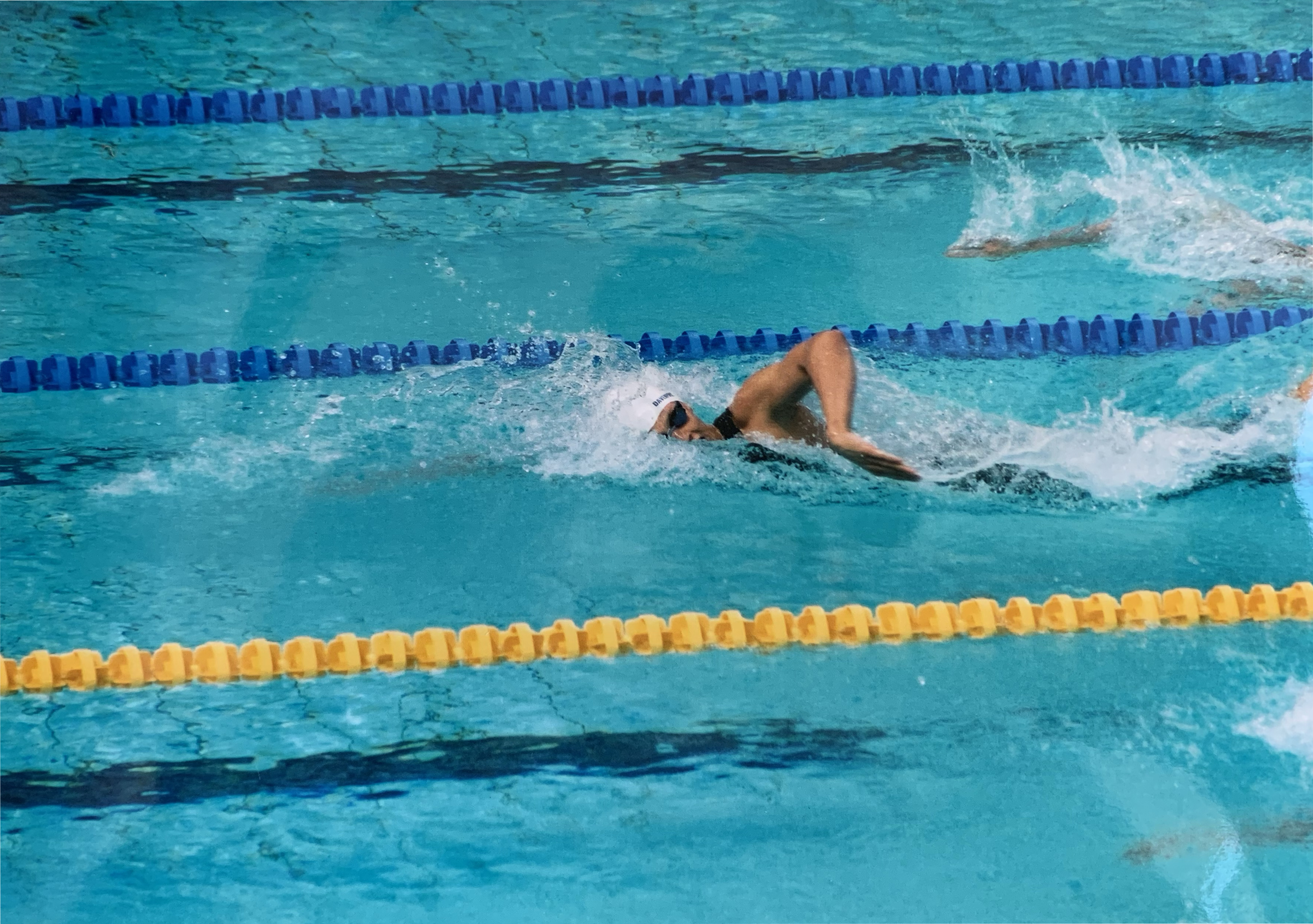

Personal information
- Full name: Ross Paul Davenport
- National team: Great Britain
- Born: 23 May 1984 (age 42) Belper, England
- Height: 1.87 m (6 ft 2 in)
- Weight: 76 kg (168 lb; 12.0 st)

Sport
- Sport: Swimming
- Strokes: Freestyle
- Club: Loughborough University
Medal record
Men's swimming
Representing Great Britain
World Championships (SC)
Silver medal – second place	2008 Manchester	4×200 m freestyle
European Championships (LC)
Silver medal – second place	2006 Budapest	4×200 m freestyle
European Championships - Short Course
Bronze medal – third place	2005 Trieste	200 m freestyle
Summer Universiade
Gold medal – first place	2003 Daegu	4×100 m freestyle
Silver medal – second place	2005 Izmir	200 m freestyle
Silver medal – second place	2005 Izmir	4×100 m freestyle
Bronze medal – third place	2003 Daegu	200 m freestyle
Representing England
Commonwealth Games
Gold medal – first place	2006 Melbourne	200 m freestyle
Gold medal – first place	2006 Melbourne	4×200 m freestyle
Silver medal – second place	2006 Melbourne	4×100 m medley
Silver medal – second place	2010 Delhi	4×100 m freestyle

Ross Paul Davenport (born 23 May 1984) is an English competitive swimmer who has represented Great Britain in the Olympics, world and European championships, and swam for England in the Commonwealth Games. He won two gold medals in the 2006 Commonwealth Games in Melbourne for the 200-metre freestyle and the 4×200-metre freestyle relay.

On Monday, 27 November 2006 he was recognized as the BBC East Midlands Sports Personality of the Year. He was a member of the University of Bath swimming club, coached by Ian Turner and trains at Loughborough University. Born in Belper, Derbyshire, he now lives and trains in Loughborough.

Ross qualified for Team GB at the 2008 Beijing Olympics in two events, the 200-metre freestyle and the 4×200-metre freestyle relay. He achieved this by winning the 200-metre freestyle, ahead of Robert Renwick, in the 2008 Long Course British Championships (incorporating the Olympic trials) on 3 April. His time in the final was 1:47.66.

He was part of the British 4x200-metre freestyle relay team at the 2012 Summer Olympics.

He started at Belper School in 1995.
