= Chris Cook (swimmer) =

British swimmer (born 1979)

Personal information
- Full name: Christopher Antony Cook
- Nickname: "Cooky"
- National team: Great Britain
- Born: 5 May 1979 (age 47) South Shields, England
- Height: 1.80 m (5 ft 11 in)
- Weight: 76 kg (168 lb; 12.0 st)

Sport
- Sport: Swimming
- Strokes: Breaststroke
- Club: City of Newcastle
Medal record
Men's swimming
Representing Great Britain
World Championships (SC)
Bronze medal – third place	2006 Shanghai	50 m breaststroke
European Championships (SC)
Bronze medal – third place	2005 Trieste	4×50 m medley
Representing England
Commonwealth Games
Gold medal – first place	2006 Melbourne	100 m breaststroke
Gold medal – first place	2006 Melbourne	50 m breaststroke
Silver medal – second place	2006 Melbourne	4×100 m medley

Christopher Anthony Cook (born 5 May 1979) is an English former competitive swimmer who swam for Great Britain in the Olympics, world championships and European championships, and competed for England in the Commonwealth Games.

Cook specialises in the breaststroke, and took gold in the 50 and 100 metre finals representing England at the 2006 Commonwealth Games in Melbourne. He has also competed for Great Britain at the 2004 Summer Olympics in Athens and the 2008 Summer Olympics in Beijing. He was named North East Sports Personality of the Year at the North East Sport Awards in 2006.

Living in Wallsend, he was coached by Ian Oliver at the City of Newcastle Swimming Club.

Cook retired from swimming after the Beijing Summer Olympics in 2008, returning to compete in the Swimming World Cup in 2013. He has continued to advocate for aquatics in North East England and around the United Kingdom through work as a motivational speaker. He has also been involved in initiatives to get more people involved in swimming, such as the Big Swim campaign in 2011.

== Personal bests and records held ==
Event	Long course	Short course
50 m breaststroke	27.82	27.02
100 m breaststroke	59.88 ^{NR}	58.66
200 m breaststroke	2:12.87	2:09.73
Key NR:British
