= James Gibson (swimmer) =

British swimmer

James Daniel Gibson MBE
Personal information
- Full name: James Daniel Gibson
- National team: Great Britain
- Born: Chelmsford, England
- Height: 1.88 m (6 ft 2 in)
- Weight: 80 kg (176 lb; 12 st 8 lb)

Sport
- Sport: Swimming
- Strokes: Breaststroke
- College team: Loughborough University
Medal record
Men's swimming
Representing Great Britain
World Championships (LC)
Gold medal – first place	2003 Barcelona	50 m breaststroke
Bronze medal – third place	2003 Barcelona	100 m breaststroke
European Championships (LC)
Bronze medal – third place	2006 Budapest	4×100 m medley
European Championships (SC)
Gold medal – first place	2003 Dublin	100 m breaststroke
Silver medal – second place	2001 Antwerp	100 m breaststroke
Silver medal – second place	2001 Antwerp	4×50 m medley
Bronze medal – third place	2008 Rijeka	100 m breaststroke
Summer Universiade
Gold medal – first place	2003 Daegu	50 m breaststroke
Gold medal – first place	2003 Daegu	100 m breaststroke
Representing England
Commonwealth Games
Gold medal – first place	2002 Manchester	50 m breaststroke
Silver medal – second place	2006 Melbourne	100 m breaststroke
Bronze medal – third place	2002 Manchester	100 m breaststroke

James Daniel Gibson is an English former competitive swimmer and breaststroker who represented Great Britain in the Olympics, FINA world championships and European championships, and England in the Commonwealth Games. He is a former world, European and Commonwealth champion in the men's 50-metre breaststroke event, and now serves as the head swimming coach at the Energy Standard Swim Club.

Born in Chelmsford, Essex, and raised in Witham. He first started swimming at Witham Dolphins swimming club in Essex and is now the club's lifelong president. Gibson's primary swimming stroke was breaststroke and he competed in the 50-, 100- and 200-metre events. In 2003 he became world champion at 50 metres (long-course). He was 6th in the 100 metre event at the Athens Olympics in 2004. A year earlier, at the 2003 Summer Universiade, he won titles in both the 50- and 100-metre breaststroke.

In choosing three words to describe himself, Gibson has said, "confidence, positive and pecs", referring to his prodigious pectoral muscles. On a 2003 edition of the sports-comedy quiz show They Think It's All Over he admitted to rippling his chest muscles before races in order to "freak out" the opposition.

He was appointed MBE in the 2004 New Year Honours. Gibson's club was Loughborough University where he was coached by BSCA Hall of Fame Olympic Coach Ben Titley. He is now a coach himself at the Energy Standard Swim Club primarily training in Turkey.

== Personal bests and records held ==
Event	Long course	Short course
50 m breaststroke	27.46	26.94
100 m breaststroke	59.68	57.91 (2008) ^{NR}
Key NR:British

== See also ==
- List of Commonwealth Games medallists in swimming (men)
- Commonwealth Games records in swimming
