= Christian Sprenger (swimmer) =

Australian swimmer

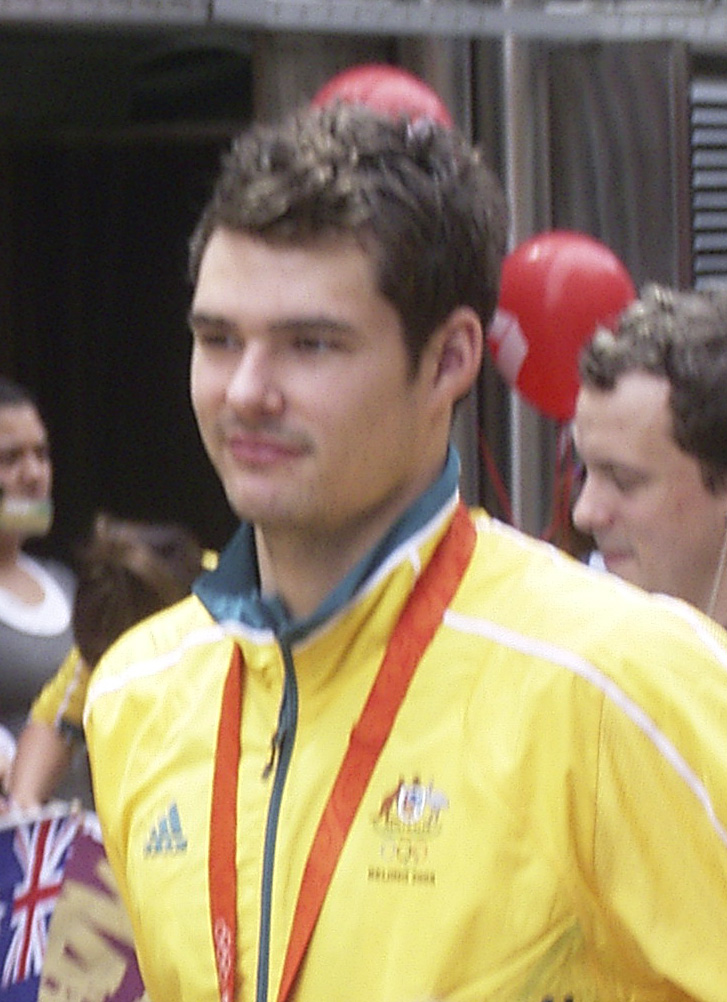

Personal information
- Full name: Christian David Sprenger
- National team: Australia
- Born: 19 December 1985 (age 40) Brisbane, Queensland
- Height: 1.96 m (6 ft 5 in)
- Weight: 92 kg (203 lb)

Sport
- Sport: Swimming
- Strokes: Breaststroke
- Club: Commercial
- Coach: Simon Cusack
Medal record
Men's swimming
Representing Australia
Olympic Games
Silver medal – second place	2008 Beijing	4×100 m medley
Silver medal – second place	2012 London	100 m breaststroke
Bronze medal – third place	2012 London	4×100 m medley
World Championships (LC)
Gold medal – first place	2013 Barcelona	100 m breaststroke
Silver medal – second place	2011 Shanghai	4×100 m medley
Silver medal – second place	2013 Barcelona	50 m breaststroke
Silver medal – second place	2013 Barcelona	4×100m medley
Bronze medal – third place	2009 Rome	200 m breaststroke
Bronze medal – third place	2009 Rome	4×100 m medley
Pan Pacific Championships
Silver medal – second place	2010 Irvine	100 m breaststroke
Bronze medal – third place	2010 Irvine	4×100 m medley
Commonwealth Games
Gold medal – first place	2006 Melbourne	4×100 m medley
Gold medal – first place	2010 Delhi	4×100 m medley
Silver medal – second place	2010 Delhi	100 m breaststroke
Silver medal – second place	2014 Glasgow	4×100 m medley
Bronze medal – third place	2010 Delhi	200 m breaststroke
Bronze medal – third place	2014 Glasgow	50 m breaststroke

Christian David Sprenger (born 19 December 1985) is an Australian former breaststroke swimmer. He trains at the Commercial Swimming Club under Simon Cusack.

== Swimming career ==
At the 2008 Australian Swimming Championships he qualified in the 100- and 200-metre breaststroke, placing second in both events to qualify for the Olympics in Beijing. He failed to make the finals in either event but picked up a silver after swimming in the heats of the medley relay. Later on in the year he won nine individual FINA World Cup races during the 2008 series. He also won seven silvers and three bronze.

Sprenger had his first individual success at global level in 2009, breaking Kosuke Kitajima's world record in the semifinals of the 200m breaststroke, and took taking two bronze medals at the World Championships in Rome.

He had more international success in 2010, as he captured a silver in the 100-metre breaststroke at the 2010 Pan Pacific Swimming Championships and a bronze in the medley relay, along with 3 medals at the Commonwealth Games.

A career highlight, Sprenger won silver in the 100-metre breaststroke at the 2012 London Olympics with a new personal best of 58.93 seconds.

At the 2013 World Aquatics, Sprenger captured gold in the 100-metre breaststroke in a new personal best time. He also collected silver in the 50-metre breaststroke.

At the 2014 Commonwealth Games, he won a bronze medal in the men's 50 m breaststroke and was part of the Australian team that won the silver in men's 4 x 100 medley relay.

== Personal life ==
Sprenger is of German descent. His cousin Nicholas Sprenger is a freestyler who represented Australia at the 2004 and 2008 Olympics.

== Career Best Times ==
Sprenger has broken 2 world records in his career

Event	Time	Record	Meet
Long Course
50 m breaststroke	26.74	AUS Record Holder	2014 Australian Championships
100 m breaststroke	58.79	Former AUS Record Holder	2013 World Championships
200 m breaststroke	2:07.31	Former WR Holder	2009 World Championships

Event	Time	Record	Meet
Short Course
50 m breaststroke	26.24	AUS Record Holder	2013 FINA Swimming World Cup
100 m breaststroke	57.14	AUS Record Holder	2013 FINA Swimming World Cup
200 m breaststroke	2:01.98	Former WR Holder	2009 Australian Championships

== See also ==
- List of Olympic medalists in swimming (men)
- World record progression 200 metres breaststroke

Records
Preceded by Kosuke Kitajima	World Record Holder; Men's 200 Breaststroke; 30 July 2009– 1 August 2012	Succeeded by Dániel Gyurta
Preceded by Ed Moses	World Record Holder; Men's 200 Breaststroke (25m); 10 August 2009– 13 December 2009	Succeeded by Dániel Gyurta
