= Andrew Bree =

Irish swimmer

Personal information
- Full name: Andrew Patrick Bree
- Nationality: Irish
- Born: 16 March 1981 (age 45) Helen's Bay, County Down, Northern Ireland
- Height: 6 ft 6 in (198 cm)
- Weight: 209 lb (95 kg)

Sport
- Sport: Swimming
- Strokes: Breaststroke
- Club: Ards/Tennessee
Medal record
swimming
Representing Ireland
European Championships - Short Course
Silver medal – second place	2003 Dublin	200 m breaststroke

Andrew Patrick Bree (born 16 March 1981) is a breaststroke swimmer from Helen's Bay, County Down, Northern Ireland. He is a two-time Olympian, having swum at the 2000 and 2008 Olympics for Ireland. He also represented Northern Ireland four times at the Commonwealths and placed fifth twice in the 200m breaststroke. Andrew attended the University of Tennessee.

He became the first Northern Irish person to win a medal at the European Short Course Swimming Championships when he finished second in the 200 m breaststroke at the 2003 Championships at the National Aquatic Centre in Dublin, Ireland. His home club is Ards, but as of 2008 he trains in the United States at the University of Tennessee.

After swimming at the 2000 Olympics in Sydney; He failed to qualify for the 2004 Summer Olympics in Athens. However, he qualified for the 2006 Commonwealth Games in Melbourne, Australia, where he equaled the 200 m LC breaststroke record and placed fifth.

In the months leading up to the 2008 Olympics he tested positive at a drug test. Bree claimed that he had used a nasal spray and did not know it contained banned substances. The results of the drug test were later overturned and he was allowed swim at the Beijing Olympics.

== Beijing 2008 Olympics ==
Bree qualified for the 2008 Summer Olympics at the 2008 US National Swimming Championships in Indiana by swimming a new personal best time and then-Irish record of 2:13.14 in the 200 m breaststroke. At the British Swimming Championships in June 2008 he swam the 100 m breaststroke in a time of 1:01.83 which allowed him to swim the 100 m breaststroke at the Olympics also. He was also entered in the heats of the 200 metres individual medley but scratched from the heats.

In the 200 m breaststroke heats he won his heat in a time of 2.10.91, breaking his own Irish record by over 2 seconds, and then lowering it again in semi-finals to 2:10.16. He is also Irish record holder in the 100 m breaststroke (1:01.78) and the 200 m individual medley (2:04.43).

== Media ==
In 2024, Bree was an analyst on the 2024 Olympics swimming coverage on RTÉ Sport.
