= Kristopher Gilchrist =

British swimmer and Olympic athlete

Personal information
- Full name: Kristopher Jon Gilchrist
- Nickname: "Kris"
- National team: Great Britain
- Born: 3 December 1983 (age 42) Edinburgh, Scotland
- Height: 1.88 m (6 ft 2 in)
- Weight: 80 kg (176 lb; 12 st 8 lb)

Sport
- Sport: Swimming
- Strokes: Breaststroke
- Club: City of Edinburgh
Medal record
Men's swimming
Representing Great Britain
World Championships – Short Course
Gold medal – first place	2008 Manchester	200 m breaststroke
European Championships – Long Course
Bronze medal – third place	2006 Budapest	200 m breaststroke
Representing Scotland
Commonwealth Games
Bronze medal – third place	2006 Melbourne	4×100 m medley

Kristopher Jon Gilchrist (born 3 December 1983) is a Scottish competitive swimmer and breaststroker who has represented Great Britain in the Olympics, FINA world championships and European championships, and Scotland in the Commonwealth Games. He is a past world champion in the 200-metre breaststroke.

At the 2008 Summer Olympics in Beijing, he competed in the 100- and 200-metre breaststroke events. At the 2008 FINA short-course world championship, he won a gold medal in the men's 200-metre breaststroke.

== Personal bests and records held ==
Event	Long course	Short course
100 m breaststroke	1:00.57	58.89
200 m breaststroke	2:10.27^{NR}	2:05.84
Key NR:British
