= Australia at the 2006 Commonwealth Games =

- CG code: AUS
- CGA: Australian Commonwealth Games Association
- Website: commonwealthgames.org.au

in Melbourne, Australia
- Competitors: 425
- Flag bearers: Opening: Jane Saville (Athletics); Closing: Leisel Jones (Swimming)
- Officials: 168
- Medals Ranked 1st: Gold 84 Silver 69 Bronze 67 Total 220

Commonwealth Games appearances (overview)
- 1930; 1934; 1938; 1950; 1954; 1958; 1962; 1966; 1970; 1974; 1978; 1982; 1986; 1990; 1994; 1998; 2002; 2006; 2010; 2014; 2018; 2022; 2026; 2030

Australian commemorative coin for the 2006 games

Australia at the 2006 Commonwealth Games was represented by Australian Commonwealth Games Association the (ACGA), and abbreviated AUS. Athletes from Australia were given automatic qualification in all sports due to the host status.

Australia first competed at the then-titled British Empire Games in 1930, and is one of only six countries to have sent athletes to every Commonwealth Games.

Australia entered the Melbourne Games as a strong favourite to win the medal tally after having won 207 medals at the 2002 Commonwealth Games in Manchester compared to England's 165 and Canada's 116. Its strongest sports are swimming and cycling.

At the 2006 Commonwealth Games, Australia was at the top of the medal tally with 221 medals: 84 Gold, 69 Silver and 68 Bronze. Jane Saville bore Australia's flag at the opening ceremony, while Leisel Jones bore the flag during the closing ceremony.

== Medallists ==
Australian medalists at the 2006 Commonwealth Games
Name	Medal	Sport	Event	Date
Anna Meares	Gold	Cycling	Women's 500 metres time trial	16 March
Stephanie Rice	Gold	Swimming	Women's 200 metres individual medley	16 March
Ben Kersten	Gold	Cycling	Men's 1 kilometre time trial	16 March
David Moore Daniel Repacholi	Gold	Shooting	Men's 50 metres pistol pairs	17 March
Michael Diamond Adam Vella	Gold	Shooting	Men's trap pairs	17 March
Suzy Balogh Deserie Baynes	Gold	Shooting	Women's trap pairs	17 March
Danni Miatke	Gold	Swimming	Women's 50 metres butterfly	17 March
Leisel Jones	Gold	Swimming	Women's 50 metres breaststroke	17 March
Katherine Bates	Gold	Cycling	Women's points race	17 March
Sean Finning	Gold	Cycling	Men's points race	17 March
Ryan Bayley	Gold	Cycling	Men's keirin	17 March
Ashleigh Brennan Hollie Dykes Naomi Russell Monette Russo Chloe Sims	Gold	Gymnastics	Women's artistic team all-around	17 March
Emma Snowsill	Gold	Triathlon	Women's triathlon	18 March
Bradley Kahlefeldt	Gold	Triathlon	Men's triathlon	18 March
Joshua Jefferis	Gold	Gymnastics	Men's artistic individual all-around	18 March
Ben Turner	Gold	Weightlifting	Men's 69 kg	18 March
Libby Lenton	Gold	Swimming	Women's 100 metres freestyle	18 March
Matthew Cowdrey	Gold	Swimming	Men's 50 metres EAD freestyle	18 March
Leisel Jones	Gold	Swimming	Women's 200 metres breaststroke	18 March
Sophie Edington	Gold	Swimming	Women's 100 metres backstroke	18 March
Ryan Bayley	Gold	Cycling	Men's sprint	18 March
Chloe Sims	Gold	Gymnastics	Women's artistic individual all-around	18 March
Bronte Barratt Libby Lenton Linda Mackenzie Kelly Stubbins	Gold	Swimming	Women's 4x200 metres freestyle relay	18 March
Dina Aspandiyarova Lalita Yauhleuskaya	Gold	Shooting	Women's 10 metres air pistol pairs	19 March
Russell Mark Craig Trembath	Gold	Shooting	Men's double trap pairs	19 March
Kerryn McCann	Gold	Athletics	Women's marathon	19 March
Jessicah Schipper	Gold	Swimming	Women's 100 metres butterfly	19 March
Katie Mactier	Gold	Cycling	Women's individual pursuit	19 March
Lauryn Mark Natalia Rahman	Gold	Shooting	Women's skeet pairs	20 March
Jane Saville	Gold	Athletics	Women's 20 kilometres walk	20 March
Nathan Deakes	Gold	Athletics	Men's 20 kilometres walk	20 March
Elizabeth McIntosh	Gold	Athletics	Women's 100 metres EAD (T37)	20 March
Brooke Krueger	Gold	Athletics	Hammer throw	20 March
Libby Lenton	Gold	Swimming	Women's 50 metres freestyle	20 March
Joanna Fargus	Gold	Swimming	Women's 200 metres backstroke	20 March
Mark Casey Bill Cornehls Wayne Turley	Gold	Lawn bowls	Men's triples	20 March
Natalie Grinham	Gold	Squash	Women's singles	20 March
Leisel Jones	Gold	Swimming	Women's 100 metres breaststroke	20 March
Matthew Cowdrey	Gold	Swimming	Men's 100 metres EAD freestyle	20 March
Sophie Edington	Gold	Swimming	Women's 50 metres backstroke	20 March
Joshua Jefferis	Gold	Gymnastics	Men's rings	20 March
Jodie Henry Libby Lenton Alice Mills Shayne Reese	Gold	Swimming	Women's 4x100 metres freestyle relay	20 March
Lalita Yauhleuskaya	Gold	Shooting	Women's 25 metres pistol	21 March
Nathan O'Neill	Gold	Cycling	Men's individual time trial	21 March
Aleksan Karapetyan	Gold	Weightlifting	Men's 94 kg	21 March
Oenone Wood	Gold	Cycling	Women's individual time trial	21 March
Deborah Lovely	Gold	Weightlifting	Women's 75 kg	21 March
Jessicah Schipper	Gold	Swimming	Women's 200 metres butterfly	21 March
Stephanie Rice	Gold	Swimming	Women's 400 metres individual medley	21 March
Sophie Edington Libby Lenton Leisel Jones Jessicah Schipper	Gold	Swimming	Women's 4x100 metres medley relay	21 March
Michael Klim Andrew Lauterstein Kenrick Monk Adam Pine Brenton Rickard Nicholas Sprenger Eamon Sullivan Matt Welsh	Gold	Swimming	Men's 4x100 metres medley relay	21 March
Hollie Dykes	Gold	Gymnastics	Women's floor	21 March
Damian Istria	Gold	Gymnastics	Men's horizontal bar	21 March
Briony Cole Sharleen Stratton	Gold	Diving	Women's 3 metres synchronised springboard	22 March
Lynsey Armitage Karen Murphy	Gold	Lawn bowls	Women's pairs	22 March
Chantelle Newbery Loudy Tourky	Gold	Diving	Women's 10 metres synchronised platform	22 March
Loudy Tourky	Gold	Diving	Women's 10 metres platform	23 March
John Steffensen	Gold	Athletics	Men's 400 metres	22 March
Australia women's national basketball team Tully Bevilaqua Jae Kingi-Cross Hollie Grima Jacinta Hamilton Katrina Hibbert Lauren Jackson Emily McInerny Erin Phillips Belinda Snell Laura Summerton Jenny Whittle Carly Wilson	Gold	Basketball	Women's tournament	23 March
Heath Francis	Gold	Athletics	Men's 200 metres EAD (T46)	23 March
Scott Martin	Gold	Athletics	Men's discus throw	23 March
Jana Pittman	Gold	Athletics	Women's 400 metres hurdles	23 March
Chris Rae	Gold	Weightlifting	Men's +105 kg	23 March
Australia men's national basketball team C.J. Bruton Bradley Davidson Russell Hinder Jacob Holmes Luke Kendall Sam MacKinnon Neil Mottram Brad Newley Paul Rogers Tony Ronaldson Jason Smith Mark Worthington	Gold	Basketball	Men's tournament	24 March
Nathan Deakes	Gold	Athletics	Men's 50 kilometres walk	24 March
Steve Hooker	Gold	Athletics	Men's pole vault	24 March
Kelvin Kerkow	Gold	Lawn bowls	Men's singles	24 March
Stuart Rendell	Gold	Athletics	Men's hammer throw	24 March
Bronwyn Thompson	Gold	Athletics	Women's long jump	24 March
Matthew Helm Robert Newbery	Gold	Diving	Men's 10 metres platform synchronised	24 March
Ben Burge	Bronze	Shooting	Men's 50 metres rifle 3 position	24 March
James Corbett	Bronze	Shooting	Open full bore rifle	23 March
Jarrod Fletcher	Gold	Boxing	Middleweight 75 kg	25 March
Rosemary Hayward Tamsyn Lewis Jana Pittman Caitlin Willis	Gold	Athletics	Women's 4 x 400 metres relay	25 March
Clinton Hill Mark Ormrod John Steffensen Chris Troode Sean Wroe*	Gold	Athletics	Men's 4 x 400 metres relay	25 March
Kym Howe	Gold	Athletics	Women's pole vault	25 March
Matthew Helm	Gold	Diving	Men's 10 metres platform	25 March
Brad Pitt	Gold	Boxing	Heavyweight 91 kg	25 March
Australia women's national field hockey team Toni Cronk Suzie Faulkner Karen Smith Kim Walker Rebecca Sanders Kate Hollywood Angie Skirving Melanie Twitt Emily Halliday Madonna Blyth Wendy Beattie Nicole Arrold Kobie McGurk Rachel Imison Sarah Taylor Nikki Hudson	Gold	Hockey	Women's tournament	25 March
Natalie Bates	Gold	Cycling	Women's road race	26 March
Natalie Grinham Rachael Grinham	Gold	Squash	Women's doubles	26 March
Natalie Grinham Joe Kneipp	Gold	Squash	Mixed doubles	26 March
Mathew Hayman	Gold	Cycling	Men's road race	26 March
Australia men's national field hockey team Jamie Dwyer Liam de Young Michael McCann Robert Hammond Nathan Eglington Mark Knowles Luke Doerner Grant Schubert Bevan George Stephen Lambert Aaron Hopkins Matthew Wells Travis Brooks Brent Livermore Dean Butler Stephen Mowlam	Gold	Hockey	Men's tournament	26 March
Libby Lenton	Silver	Swimming	Women's 200 metres freestyle	16 March
Brooke Hanson	Silver	Swimming	Women's 200 metres individual medley	16 March
Travis Nederpelt	Silver	Swimming	Men's 200 metres butterfly	16 March
Ashley Callus Brett Hawke Michael Klim Eamon Sullivan	Silver	Swimming	Men's 4x100 metres freestyle relay	16 March
Damian Istria Joshua Jefferis Samuel Offord Philippe Rizzo Prashanth Sellathurai	Silver	Gymnastics	Men's artistic team all-around	16 March
Pamela McKenzie Lalita Yauhleuskaya	Silver	Shooting	Women's 25 metres pistol pairs	17 March
Jessicah Schipper	Silver	Swimming	Women's 50 metres butterfly	17 March
Rochelle Gilmore	Silver	Cycling	Women's points race	17 March
Jade Edmistone	Silver	Swimming	Women's 50 metres breaststroke	17 March
David Moore Bruce Quick	Silver	Shooting	Men's 25 metres standard pistol pairs	18 March
Jodie Henry	Silver	Swimming	Women's 100 metres freestyle	18 March
Matthew Goss Ashley Hutchinson Mark Jamieson Stephen Wooldridge	Silver	Cycling	Men's team pursuit	18 March
Matthew Welsh	Silver	Swimming	Men's 50 metres butterfly	18 March
Giaan Rooney	Silver	Swimming	Women's 100 metres backstroke	18 March
Anna Meares	Silver	Cycling	Women's sprint	18 March
David Chapman Bruce Favell	Silver	Shooting	Men's 25 metres rapid fire pistol pairs	19 March
James Corbett Bruce Scott	Silver	Shooting	Open full bore rifle pairs	19 March
Danielle Liesch Irena Olevsky	Silver	Synchronised swimming	Women's duet	19 March
Libby Lenton	Silver	Swimming	100 metres butterfly	19 March
Katherine Bates	Silver	Cycling	Women's individual pursuit	19 March
Melissa Gorman	Silver	Swimming	Women's 800 metres freestyle	19 March
Ashley Hutchinson	Silver	Cycling	Men's scratch race	19 March
Michael Brown Ben Burge	Silver	Shooting	Men's 50 metres rifle 3 positions pairs	20 March
Bruce Quick	Bronze	Shooting	Men's 25m standard pisto	25 March
Bruce Scott	Gold	Shooting	Open full bore	23 March
Lalita Yauhleuskaya	Gold	Shooting	Women's 10m air pistol	23 March
Lauryn Mark	Silver	Shooting	Women's skeet	24 March
Clive Barton	Silver	Shooting	Men's skeet	25 March
Dina Aspandiyarova	Silver	Shooting	Women's 10m air pistol	23 March
Natalie Saville	Silver	Athletics	Women's 20 kilometres walk	20 March
Luke Adams	Silver	Athletics	Men's 20 kilometres walk	20 March
Ceriann Davies Roma Dunn Noi Tucker	Silver	Lawn bowls	Women's triples	20 March
Perri Campbell-Innes May Cho Jian Fang Lay Miao Miao Stephanie Sang	Silver	Table tennis	Women's team	20 March
Katrina Webb	Silver	Athletics	Women's 100 metres EAD (T37)	20 March
Rachael Grinham	Silver	Squash	Women's singles	20 March
Michael Klim	Silver	Swimming	Men's 100 metres butterfly	20 March
Jodie Henry	Silver	Swimming	Women's 50 metres freestyle	20 March
Rachael Grinham	Silver	Squash	Women's singles	20 March
Jade Edmistone	Silver	Swimming	Women's 100 metres breaststroke	20 March
Matt Welsh	Silver	Swimming	Men's 100 metres backstroke	20 March
Prashanth Sellathurai	Silver	Gymnastics	Men's pommel horse	20 March
Giaan Rooney	Silver	Swimming	Women's 50 metres backstroke	20 March
Damian Istria	Silver	Gymnastics	Men's rings	20 March
David Palmer	Silver	Squash	Men's singles	20 March
Craig Mottram	Silver	Athletics	Men's 5000 metres	20 March
Ben Day	Silver	Cycling	Men's individual time trial	21 March
Simon Heffernan	Silver	Weightlifting	Men's 94 kg	21 March
Kathryn Watt	Silver	Cycling	Women's individual time trial	21 March
Felicity Galvez	Silver	Swimming	Women's 200 metres butterfly	21 March
Brenton Rickard	Silver	Swimming	Men's 200 metres breaststroke	21 March
Sarah Jamieson	Silver	Athletics	Women's 1500 metres	21 March
Hollie Dykes	Silver	Gymnastics	Women's beam	21 March
Philippe Rizzo	Silver	Gymnastics	Men's parallel bars	21 March
Ashleigh Brennan	Silver	Gymnastics	Women's floor	21 March
Valeriane Sarava	Silver	Weightlifting	Men's 105 kg	22 March
Melissa Rollison	Silver	Athletics	Women's 3000 metres steeplechase	22 March
Alex Croak Melissa Wu	Silver	Diving	Women's 10 metres synchronised platform	22 March
Robert Newbery	Silver	Diving	Men's 3 metre springboard	23 March
Chantelle Newbery	Silver	Diving	Women's 10 metres platform	23 March
Chantelle Newbery	Silver	Diving	Women's 3 metres springboard	25 March
Sharleen Stratton	Silver	Diving	Women's 1 metres springboard	24 March
Damon Kelly	Silver	Weightlifting	Men's +105 kg	23 March
Australia national netball team Megan Anderson-Dehn Natalie Avellino Alison Broadbent Bianca Chatfield Catherine Cox Susan Fuhrmann Selina Gilsenan Janine Ilitch Sharelle McMahon Susan Pratley Jess Shynn Natalie von Bertouch	Silver	Netball	Tournament	26 March
Stewart Boswell Anthony Ricketts	Silver	Squash	Men's doubles	26 March
William Henzell	Silver	Table tennis	Men's singles	26 March
Kimberly Mason	Silver	Gymnastics	Women's rhythmic ball	26 March
Oenone Wood	Silver	Cycling	Women's road race	26 March
Erika Yamasaki	Bronze	Weightlifting	Women's 48 kg	16 March
Kerrie Meares	Bronze	Cycling	Women's 500 metres time trial	16 March
Lara Carroll	Bronze	Swimming	Women's 200 metres individual medley	16 March
Joshua Krogh	Bronze	Swimming	Men's 200 metres butterfly	16 March
Nadeene Latif	Bronze	Weightlifting	Women's 53 kg	17 March
Alice Tait	Bronze	Swimming	Women's 50 metres butterfly	17 March
Tarnee White	Bronze	Swimming	Women's 50 metres breaststroke	17 March
Annabelle Williams	Bronze	Swimming	Women's 50 metres EAD freestyle	17 March
David Moore Daniel Repacholi	Bronze	Shooting	Men's 10 metres air pistol pairs	18 March
Natasha Barker	Bronze	Weightlifting	Women's 58 kg	18 March
Peter Robertson	Bronze	Triathlon	Men's triathlon	18 March
Philippe Rizzo	Bronze	Gymnastics	Men's artistic individual all-around	18 March
Alice Tait	Bronze	Swimming	Women's 100 metres freestyle	18 March
Michael Klim	Bronze	Swimming	Men's 50 metres butterfly	18 March
Kerrie Meares	Bronze	Cycling	Women's sprint	18 March
Brenton Rickard	Bronze	Swimming	Men's 100 metres breaststroke	18 March
Hollie Dykes	Bronze	Gymnastics	Women's artistic individual all-around	18 March
Nicholas Ffrost Joshua Krogh Andrew Mewing Kenrick Monk	Bronze	Swimming	Men's 4x200 metres freestyle relay	18 March
Irena Olevsky	Bronze	Synchronised Swimming	Women's solo	19 March
Travis Nederpelt	Bronze	Swimming	Men's 400 metres individual medley	19 March
Ryan Bayley Shane Kelly Shane Perkins	Bronze	Cycling	Men's team sprint	19 March
Clive Barton George Barton	Bronze	Shooting	Men's skeet pairs	20 March
Asti Poole	Bronze	Athletics	Women's seated shot put EAD	20 March
Cheryl Webb	Bronze	Athletics	Women's 20 kilometres walk	20 March
Jared Tallent	Bronze	Athletics	Men's 20 kilometres walk	20 March
Alice Tait	Bronze	Swimming	Women's 50 metres freestyle	20 March
Brenton Rickard	Bronze	Swimming	Men's 50 metres breaststroke	20 March
Naomi Russell	Bronze	Gymnastics	Women's vault	20 March
Scott Martin	Bronze	Athletics	Men's shot put	20 March
Bronte Barratt	Bronze	Swimming	Women's 400 metres freestyle	20 March
Tayliah Zimmer	Bronze	Swimming	Women's 50 metres backstroke	20 March
Monette Russo	Bronze	Gymnastics	Women's uneven bars	20 March
Pamela McKenzie	Bronze	Shooting	Women's 25 metres pistol	21 March
Sara Carrigan	Bronze	Cycling	Women's individual time trial	21 March
Brett Hawke	Bronze	Swimming	Men's 50 metres freestyle	21 March
Jim Piper	Bronze	Swimming	Men's 200 metres breaststroke	21 March
Samuel Offord	Bronze	Gymnastics	Men's vault	21 March
Jennifer Reilly	Bronze	Swimming	Women's 400 metres individual medley	21 March
Jason Dudley	Bronze	Athletics	Men's decathlon	21 March
Dani Samuels	Bronze	Athletics	Women's discus throw	21 March
Joshua Jefferis	Bronze	Gymnastics	Men's parallel bars	21 March
Barrie Lester Nathan Rice	Bronze	Lawn bowls	Men's pairs	22 March
Steven Barnett	Bronze	Diving	Men's 1 metre springboard	22 March
Fabrice Lapierre	Bronze	Athletics	Men's long jump	22 March
Donna MacFarlane	Bronze	Athletics	Women's 3000 metres steeplechase	22 March
Christopher Jackson	Bronze	Boxing	Featherweight 57 kg	23 March
David McEachran	Bronze	Boxing	Light heavyweight 81 kg	23 March
Paul Rudic	Bronze	Boxing	Super heavyweight +91 kg	23 March
Leonardo Zappavigna	Bronze	Boxing	Lightweight 60 kg	23 March
Steven Barnett	Bronze	Diving	Men's 3 metres springboard	23 March
Darren Gardiner	Bronze	Weightlifting	Open EAD powerlifting	24 March
Naazmi Johnston Amanda Lee See Kimberly Mason	Bronze	Gymnastics	Women's rhythmic team ranking	24 March
Steven Barnett Robert Newbery	Bronze	Diving	Men's 3 metre springboard synchronised	24 March
Elizabeth Bradshaw	Bronze	Diving	Women's 1 metres springboard	24 March
Elizabeth Bradshaw	Bronze	Diving	Women's 3 metres springboard	25 March
Jian Fang Lay Miao Miao	Bronze	Table tennis	Women's doubles	25 March
Allan Davis	Bronze	Cycling	Men's road race	26 March
Dan Jenson David Palmer	Bronze	Squash	Men's doubles	26 March
Rachael Grinham David Palmer	Bronze	Squash	Mixed doubles	26 March
Kimberly Mason	Bronze	Gymnastics	Women's rhythmic clubs	26 March

^{*} – Indicates the athlete competed in preliminaries but not the final relay.

Medals by sport
Sport	Gold medal	Silver medal	Bronze medal	Total
Swimming	19	18	17	54
Athletics	16	8	6	30
Shooting	9	8	6	23
Cycling	11	8	5	24
Diving	5	5	5	15
Gymnastics	6	7	8	21
Weightlifting	4	3	4	11
Squash	3	3	2	8
Lawn bowls	3	1	1	5
Boxing	2	0	4	6
Triathlon	2	0	1	3
Basketball	2	0	0	2
Hockey	2	0	0	2
Table tennis	0	2	1	3
Synchronized swimming	0	1	1	2
Netball	0	1	0	1
Total	84	69	68	221

== Athletics ==
Men
Track

Athlete	Events	Round 1		Round 2		Semifinal		Final	
Athlete	Events	Time	Rank	Time	Rank	Time	Rank	Time	Rank
Ambrose Ezenwa	100 m	10.53	3 Q	10.47	3 Q	10.50	8	Did not advance	
Patrick Johnson	100 m	10.50	1 Q	10.33	2 Q	10.26	3 Q	10.26	6
Joshua Ross	100 m	10.36	2 Q	10.23	3 Q	10.28	5	Did not advance	
Jonathan Bernard	100 m EAD (T12)	11.82	2 q	—N/a		12.07	2	Did not advance	
Paul Harpur	100 m EAD (T12)	11.90	2 q	—N/a		12.20	3	Did not advance	
Daniel Batman	200 m	20.86	1 Q	20.74	2 Q	20.90	6	Did not advance	
Ambrose Ezenwa	200 m	21.10	4 q	20.87	4 q	20.97	7	Did not advance	
Patrick Johnson	200 m	20.74	1 Q	20.64	1 Q	20.63	3 Q	20.59	4
Michael Armstrong	200 m EAD (T46)	24.24	5	—N/a				Did not advance	
Heath Francis	200 m EAD (T46)	22.80	1 Q	—N/a				22.96	1st place, gold medalist(s)
Tim Matthews	200 m EAD (T46)	23.76	3 Q	—N/a				24.24	6
Clinton Hill	400 m	46.18	2 Q	—N/a		45.86	5	Did not advance	
John Steffensen	400 m	45.87	1 Q	—N/a		45.05	1 Q	44.73	1st place, gold medalist(s)
Sean Wroe	400 m	46.17	4 q	—N/a		46.47	8	Did not advance	
Nick Bromley	800 m	1:47.74	2 Q	—N/a				1:50.45	6
Mark Fountain	1500 m	3:38.31	2 Q	—N/a				3:39.33	3rd place, bronze medalist(s)
Craig Mottram	1500 m	3:38.02	1 Q	—N/a				3:44.37	9
Jeremy Roff	1500 m	3:42.04	6 q	—N/a				3:41.50	8
Craig Mottram	5000 m	—N/a						12:58.19	2nd place, silver medalist(s)
Louis Rowan	5000 m	—N/a						14:40.07	18
Gregory Eyears	110 m hurdles	14.00	4	—N/a				Did not advance	
Kyle Vander Krup	110 m hurdles	14.22	5	—N/a				Did not advance	
Brendan Cole	400 m hurdles	49.85	2 Q	—N/a		49.36	4 Q	49.41	5
Tristan Thomas	400 m hurdles	49.88	3 Q	—N/a		50.56	5	Did not advance	
Youcef Abdi	3000 m steeplechase	—N/a						9:02.22	11
Martin Dent	3000 m steeplechase	—N/a						8:28.98	4
Peter Nowill	3000 m steeplechase	—N/a						8:30.59	6
Daniel Batman; Patrick Johnson; Adam Miller; Matt Shirvington; Joshua Ross*; Ambrose Ezenwa*	4 × 100 m relay	38.57	2 Q	—N/a				DNF	
John Steffensen; Chris Troode; Mark Ormrod; Clinton Hill; Sean Wroe*	4 × 400 m relay	3:03.04	1 Q	—N/a				3:00.93	1st place, gold medalist(s)
Andrew Letherby	Marathon	—N/a						2:17:11	5
Shane Nankervis	Marathon	—N/a						2:19:15	7
Scott Westcott	Marathon	—N/a						2:16:32	4
Luke Adams	20 km walk	—N/a						1:21:38	2nd place, silver medalist(s)
Nathan Deakes	20 km walk	—N/a						1:19:55	1st place, gold medalist(s)
Jared Tallent	20 km walk	—N/a						1:23:32	3rd place, bronze medalist(s)
Duane Cousins	50 km walk	—N/a						DSQ	
Nathan Deakes	50 km walk	—N/a						3:42:53	1st place, gold medalist(s)
Chris Erickson	50 km walk	—N/a						3:58:22	3rd place, bronze medalist(s)

Field

Athlete	Events	Qualification		Final	
Athlete	Events	Distance	Rank	Distance	Rank
Kane Brigg	High jump	2.05	16	Did not advance	
Nick Moroney	High jump	2.15	5 q	2.20	5
Paul Burgess	Pole vault	—N/a		NM	
Steve Hooker	Pole vault	—N/a		5.80	1st place, gold medalist(s)
Dmitri Markov	Pole vault	—N/a		5.60	2nd place, silver medalist(s)
Fabrice Lapierre	Long jump	7.92	3 Q	8.10	3rd place, bronze medalist(s)
Tim Parravicini	Long jump	7.81	7 q	7.91	7
John Thornell	Long jump	7.83	5 q	7.98	5
Alwyn Jones	Triple jump	—N/a		16.75	3rd place, bronze medalist(s)
Andrew Murphy	Triple jump	—N/a		16.70	4
Michael Perry	Triple jump	—N/a		16.24	9
Clay Cross	Shot put	17.84	7 q	18.44	6
Scott Martin	Shot put	19.64	1 Q	19.48	3rd place, bronze medalist(s)
Benn Harradine	Discus throw	59.70	5 q	58.87	8
Scott Martin	Discus throw	60.63	2 Q	63.48	1st place, gold medalist(s)
Aaron Neighbour	Discus throw	57.34	9 q	49.61	11
Terence Giddy	Discus throw EAD	—N/a		27.04	7
Richard Nicholson	Discus throw EAD	—N/a		28.29	5
Bryan Stitfall	Discus throw EAD	—N/a		27.84	6
Stuart Rendell	Hammer throw	—N/a		77.53	1st place, gold medalist(s)
Jarrod Bannister	Javelin throw	—N/a		78.06	6
Oliver Dziubak	Javelin throw	—N/a		79.89	3rd place, bronze medalist(s)
William Hamlyn-Harris	Javelin throw	—N/a		79.89	2nd place, silver medalist(s)

Decathlon

Athlete	Events	100 m		Long jump		Shot put		High jump		400 m		110 m hurdles		Discus throw		Pole vault		Javelin throw		1500 m		Total	
Athlete	Events	Time	Rank	Distance	Rank	Distance	Rank	Distance	Rank	Time	Rank	Time	Rank	Distance	Rank	Distance	Rank	Distance	Rank	Time	Rank	Score	Rank
Richard Allan	Decathlon	11.03	3	7.09	4	12.63	8	1.90	4	49.98	5	15.19	7	44.89	4	4.50	3	55.86	6	5:15.26	8	7367	6
Jason Dudley	Decathlon	11.40	7	7.27	3	14.73	3	2.02	2	49.86	4	14.71	2	50.10	2	4.50	3	69.27	1	5:03.82	5	8001	3rd place, bronze medalist(s)
Matthew McEwen	Decathlon	11.18	6	6.67	8	14.42	4	1.90	4	51.08	7	15.07	6	40.37	7	4.50	3	57.42	3	5:07.89	7	7277	7

Women
Track

Athlete	Events	Heats		Semifinal		Final	
Athlete	Events	Time	Rank	Time	Rank	Time	Rank
Sally McLellan	100 m	11.51	1 Q	11.38	2 Q	11.50	7
Elizabeth McIntosh	100 m EAD (T37)	—N/a				14.38	1st place, gold medalist(s)
Katherine Proudfoot	100 m EAD (T37)	—N/a				15.06	5
Katrina Webb	100 m EAD (T37)	—N/a				14.51	2nd place, silver medalist(s)
Crystal Attenborough	200 m	23.64	3 Q	23.88	6	Did not advance	
Melanie Kleeberg	200 m	23.51	3 Q	23.96	5	Did not advance	
Rosemary Hayward	400 m	52.90	3 Q	52.47	3 q	52.81	8
Jaimee Hoebergen	400 m	53.12	4 q	53.26	7	Did not advance	
Tamsyn Lewis	400 m	53.21	2 Q	52.88	4	Did not advance	
Elizabeth Allen	800 m	2:04.97	4 q	2:05.43	8	Did not advance	
Erica Sigmont	800 m	2:05.37	3	Did not advance			
Suzanne Walsham	800 m	2:04.00	3 q	2:04.02	6	Did not advance	
Angela Ballard	800 m EAD (T54)	2:05.22	3 Q	—N/a		1:58.78	6
Christie Dawes	800 m EAD (T54)	2:04.98	2 Q	—N/a		1:58.50	5
Eliza Stankovic	800 m EAD (T54)	1:56.36	2 Q	—N/a		1:49.62	2nd place, silver medalist(s)
Lisa Corrigan	1500 m	4:11.21	2 Q	—N/a		4:15.05	12
Sarah Jamieson	1500 m	4:11.85	4 Q	—N/a		4:06.64	2nd place, silver medalist(s)
Suzanne Walsham	1500 m	4:10.38	4 Q	—N/a		4:08.42	6
Sarah Jamieson	5000 m	—N/a				15:02.90	5
Eloise Wellings	5000 m	—N/a				15:00.69	4
Benita Johnson	10000 m	—N/a				31:58.08	4
Anna Thompson	10000 m	—N/a				32:27.74	5
Fiona Cullen	100 m hurdles	13.35	3 Q	—N/a		13.31	5
Sally McLellan	100 m hurdles	13.02	3 Q	—N/a		DSQ	
Lauren Boden	400 m hurdles	57.77	5	—N/a		Did not advance	
Sonia Britto	400 m hurdles	57.37	4 q	—N/a		57.23	7
Jana Pittman	400 m hurdles	55.06	1 Q	—N/a		53.82	1st place, gold medalist(s)
Donna MacFarlane	3000 m steeplechase	—N/a				9:25.05	3rd place, bronze medalist(s)
Victoria Mitchell	3000 m steeplechase	—N/a				9:34.24	4
Melissa Rollison	3000 m steeplechase	—N/a				9:24.29	2nd place, silver medalist(s)
Sally McLellan; Melanie Kleeberg; Lauren Hewitt; Crystal Attenborough	4 × 100 m relay	—N/a				44.25	3rd place, bronze medalist(s)
Jana Pittman; Caitlin Willis; Tamsyn Lewis; Rosemary Hayward	4 × 400 m relay	—N/a				3:28.66	1st place, gold medalist(s)
Kerryn McCann	Marathon	—N/a				2:30:54	1st place, gold medalist(s)
Lauren Shelley	Marathon	—N/a				2:39:13	8
Kate Smythe	Marathon	—N/a				2:38:30	7
Jane Saville	20 km walk	—N/a				1:32:46	1st place, gold medalist(s)
Natalie Saville	20 km walk	—N/a				1:33:33	2nd place, silver medalist(s)
Cheryl Webb	20 km walk	—N/a				1:36:03	3rd place, bronze medalist(s)

Field

Athlete	Events	Qualification		Final	
Athlete	Events	Distance	Rank	Distance	Rank
Claire Mallett	High jump	—N/a		1.83	6
Ellen Pettitt	High jump	—N/a		1.83	6
Petrina Price	High jump	—N/a		1.78	9
Tatiana Grigorieva	Pole vault	4.10	3 q	4.35	2nd place, silver medalist(s)
Kym Howe	Pole vault	4.20	1 q	4.62	1st place, gold medalist(s)
Vicky Parnov	Pole vault	4.10	2 q	4.25	6
Lisa Morrison	Long jump	6.31	9 q	6.12	12
Kerrie Taurima	Long jump	6.48	4 q	6.57	2nd place, silver medalist(s)
Bronwyn Thompson	Long jump	6.71	1 Q	6.97	1st place, gold medalist(s)
Jeanette Bowles	Triple jump	—N/a		13.23	6
Dani Samuels	Shot put	—N/a		14.91	12
Asti Poole	Shot put EAD	—N/a		533	3rd place, bronze medalist(s)
Monique Nacsa	Discus throw	—N/a		53.00	10
Dani Samuels	Discus throw	—N/a		59.44	3rd place, bronze medalist(s)
Karyne Di Marco	Hammer throw	—N/a		62.23	4
Brooke Krueger	Hammer throw	—N/a		67.90	1st place, gold medalist(s)
Gabrielle Neighbour	Hammer throw	—N/a		61.55	7
Rosie Hooper	Javelin throw	—N/a		52.46	8
Kimberley Mickle	Javelin throw	—N/a		58.18	4
Kathryn Mitchell	Javelin throw	—N/a		55.22	6

Heptathlon

Athlete	Events	100 m hurdles		High jump		Shot put		200 m		Long jump		Javelin throw		800 m		Total	
Athlete	Events	Time	Rank	Distance	Rank	Distance	Rank	Time	Rank	Distance	Rank	Distance	Rank	Time	Rank	Score	Rank
Jane Jamieson	Heptathlon	14.23	12	1.82	3	13.31	3	26.63	11	5.75	10	45.98	2	DNS		DNF	
Kylie Wheeler	Heptathlon	13.63	4	1.82	3	13.04	5	24.46	5	6.52	1	37.88	8	2:10.62	2	6298	2nd place, silver medalist(s)

== Badminton ==
=== Men's ===
Athlete	Event	Round of 64	Round of 32	Round of 16	Quarterfinals	Semifinals	Final / BM	
Athlete	Event	Opposition Result	Opposition Result	Opposition Result	Opposition Result	Opposition Result	Opposition Result	Rank
Stuart Brehaut	Singles	Bye	(Malaysia) Wong; L 0–2	Did not advance				
Ashley Brehaut; Travis Denney	Doubles	—N/a	(Isle of Man) Fairhurst / Wilkinson; W 2–0	(Mauritius) Beeharry / Clarisse; W 2–0	(New Zealand) Bellingham / Cooper; W 2–1	(Malaysia) Chan / Koo; L 0–2	(England) Blair / Clark; L 0–2	4
Ross Smith; Glenn Warfe	Doubles	—N/a	(Sri Lanka) Karunarante / Kumarapperuma; W 2–0	(New Zealand) Moody / Shirley; L 1–2	Did not advance			

=== Women's ===
Athlete	Event	Round of 64	Round of 32	Round of 16	Quarterfinals	Semifinals	Final / BM	
Athlete	Event	Opposition Result	Opposition Result	Opposition Result	Opposition Result	Opposition Result	Opposition Result	Rank
Erin Carroll	Singles	(Fiji) A. Whiteside; W 2–0	(Jersey) Pasturel; L 0–2	Did not advance				
Foong Meng Cheah	Singles	(Jersey) Cann; L 0–2	Did not advance					
Tania Luiz	Singles	(South Africa) Edwards; W 2–0	(Fiji) K. Whiteside; W 2–1	(New Zealand) Hidnley; L 0–2	Did not advance			
Kellie Lucas	Singles	(New Zealand) Bellingham; L 0–2	Did not advance					
Kellie Lucas; Kate Wilson-Smith	Doubles	—N/a	(Barbados) Forde / Watson; W 2–0	(England) Emms / Kellogg; L 0–2	Did not advance			

=== Mixed ===
Athlete	Event	Preliminary round					Round of 64	Round of 32	Round of 16	Quarterfinals	Semifinals	Final / BM	
Athlete	Event	Opposition Result	Opposition Result	Opposition Result	Opposition Result	Rank	Opposition Result	Opposition Result	Opposition Result	Opposition Result	Opposition Result	Opposition Result	Rank
Erin Carroll; Ashley Brehaut	Doubles	—N/a					(Trinidad and Tobago) Quan Chee / Seepaul; W 2–0	(England) Tripp / Archer; L 0–2	Did not advance				
Kellie Lucas; Ross Smith	Doubles	—N/a					(Mauritius) Aboobakar / Beeharry; W 2–0	(South Africa) Edwards / James; L 0–2	Did not advance				
Kate Wilson-Smith; Travis Denney	Doubles	—N/a					Bye	(Northern Ireland) Lynas / Topping; W 2–0	(Guernsey) Johnson / Le Tocq; W 2–0	(Singapore) Yujia Li / Saputra; L 0–2	Did not advance		
Ashley Brehaut; Stuart Brehaut; Erin Carroll; Foong Meng Cheah; Travis Denney; Kellie Lucas; Tania Luiz; Ross Smith; Glenn Warfe; Kate Wilson-Smith	Team	(Jamaica) Jamaica; W 5–0	(Uganda) Uganda; W 5–0	(Kenya) Kenya; W 5–0	(New Zealand) New Zealand; L 1–4	2 Q	—N/a			(Malaysia) Malaysia; L 0–3	Did not advance		

== Basketball ==
=== Men's tournament ===
Australia men's national basketball team – 2006 Commonwealth Games roster
Players
Coaches

Pos.	No.	Name	Age – Date of birth	Height	Club	Ctr.
PF	4	Tony Ronaldson	33 – 25 May 1972	2.03 m (6 ft 8 in)	Perth Wildcats	(Australia)
PF	5	Jacob Holmes	22 – 14 August 1983	2.01 m (6 ft 7 in)	Adelaide 36ers	(Australia)
SG	6	Sam Mackinnon	29 – 25 August 1976	1.97 m (6 ft 6 in)	Brisbane Bullets	(Australia)
PG	7	Luke Kendall	24 – 25 May 1981	1.93 m (6 ft 4 in)	Sydney Kings	(Australia)
SG	8	Brad Newley	21 – 18 February 1985	2.01 m (6 ft 7 in)	Townsville Crocodiles	(Australia)
PG	9	C. J. Bruton (C)	30 – 13 December 1975	1.88 m (6 ft 2 in)	Sydney Kings	(Australia)
G/F	10	Jason Smith	31 – 20 August 1974	1.94 m (6 ft 4 in)	Sydney Kings	(Australia)
SF	11	Mark Worthington	22 – 8 June 1983	2.02 m (6 ft 8 in)	Sydney Kings	(Australia)
PF	12	Neil Mottram	24 – 26 August 1981	2.05 m (6 ft 9 in)	Melbourne Tigers	(Australia)
C	13	Russell Hinder	26 – 10 July 1979	2.08 m (6 ft 10 in)	Hunter Pirates	(Australia)
PG	14	Brad Davidson	31 – 17 May 1974	1.82 m (6 ft 0 in)	Hunter Pirates	(Australia)
C	15	Paul Rogers	32 – 29 September 1973	2.13 m (7 ft 0 in)	Perth Wildcats	(Australia)

Head coach

- (Australia) Brian Goorjian

Assistant coaches

- (Australia) Rob Beveridge
- (Australia) Brendan Joyce
- (Australia) Nik Popovic

Legend

- (C) Team captain
- Club field describes club at the time of the competition

Group play

Team	Pld	W	L	PF	PA	PD	GA	Pts
Australia	3	3	0	365	156	+209	2.340	6
Nigeria	3	2	1	261	270	−9	0.967	5
Scotland	3	1	2	202	277	−75	0.729	4
India	3	0	3	190	313	−123	0.607	3

17 March 2006
20:15

Report

Australia	129–52	Scotland
Scoring by quarter: 37–17, 32–11, 35–15, 25–9
Pts: Newley 23; Rebs: Holmes, Rogers 6 Asts: Mackinnon 7		Pts: Wardrope 9 Rebs: Pearson 5 Asts: Costello 4

Bendigo Stadium, Bendigo

19 March 2006
20:15

Report

Australia	103–57	Nigeria
Scoring by quarter: 20–14, 29–17, 24–9, 30–17
Pts: Smith 16; Rebs: Mackinnon 11; Asts: Bruton 6		Pts: Gumut 12; Rebs: Muoneke 10; Asts: three players 1

Bendigo Stadium, Bendigo

20 March 2006
20:15

Report

Australia	133–49	India
Scoring by quarter: 37–15, 42–6, 29–16, 25–12
Pts: Smith, Worthington 18; Rebs: Holmes 10; Asts: Bruton 7		Pts: Rai 14; Rebs: Ravindran 6 Asts: Uddin 6

Ballarat Minerdome, Ballarat

Semifinal

22 March 2006
13:45

Report

Australia	101–75	England
Scoring by quarter: 27–23, 23–23, 27–12, 24–17
Pts: Smith 18; Rebs: Mackinnon 11; Asts: Bruton 6		Pts: Joseph 18; Rebs: Reed 14; Asts: Amaechi, Sullivan 4

Melbourne Multi Purpose Venue, Melbourne

Gold medal match

24 March 2006
20:15

Report

Australia	81–76	New Zealand
Scoring by quarter: 25–15, 11–22, 25–25, 20–14
Pts: Kendall 17; Rebs: Mackinnon 9 Asts: Bruton 6		Pts: Cameron 22; Rebs: Boucher 7 Asts: Boucher, Henare 4

Melbourne Multi Purpose Venue, Melbourne

=== Women's tournament ===
Australia women's national basketball team – 2006 Commonwealth Games roster
Players
Coaches

Pos.	No.	Name	Age – Date of birth	Height	Club	Ctr.
PG	4	Jae Kingi-Cross	30 – 20 January 1976	1.75 m (5 ft 9 in)	San Antonio Silver Stars	(United States)
G	5	Tully Bevilaqua	33 – 19 July 1972	1.70 m (5 ft 7 in)	Indiana Fever	(United States)
C	6	Katrina Hibbert	28 – 29 September 1977	1.78 m (5 ft 10 in)	Bulleen Boomers	(Australia)
G	7	Carly Wilson	23 – 8 July 1982	1.89 m (6 ft 2 in)	Dandenong Rangers	(Australia)
C	8	Hollie Grima	22 – 16 December 1983	1.90 m (6 ft 3 in)	Bulleen Boomers	(Australia)
PF	9	Jacinta Hamilton	23 – 3 May 1982	1.87 m (6 ft 2 in)	Dandenong Rangers	(Australia)
G	10	Erin Phillips	20 – 19 May 1985	1.73 m (5 ft 8 in)	Connecticut Sun	(United States)
C	11	Laura Summerton	22 – 13 December 1983	1.91 m (6 ft 3 in)	Connecticut Sun	(United States)
G	12	Belinda Snell	25 – 10 January 1981	1.80 m (5 ft 11 in)	Phoenix Mercury	(United States)
C	13	Jenny Whittle	32 – 5 September 1973	1.97 m (6 ft 6 in)	Canberra Capitals	(Australia)
	14	Emily McInerny	27 – 30 April 1978	1.84 m (6 ft 0 in)	Dandenong Rangers	(Australia)
PF	15	Lauren Jackson (C)	24 – 11 May 1981	1.96 m (6 ft 5 in)	Seattle Storm	(United States)

Head coach

- (Australia) Jan Stirling

Assistant coaches

- (Australia) Cheryl Chambers
- (Australia) Gary Fox

Legend

- (C) Team captain
- Club field describes club at the time of the competition

Group play

Team	Pld	W	L	PF	PA	PD	GA	Pts
Australia	3	3	0	345	115	+230	3.000	6
England	3	2	1	231	198	+33	1.167	5
India	3	1	2	161	304	−143	0.530	4
Mozambique	3	0	3	126	246	−120	0.512	3

16 March 2006
20:15

Report

Australia	146–46	India
Scoring by quarter: 41–6, 31–14, 33–10, 41–16
Pts: Jackson 41; Rebs: Hamilton 11; Asts: Bevilaqua 9		Pts: Pauldurai 21; Rebs: Sam 4 Asts: Gujar, Maggon 2

Traralgon Sports Stadium, Traralgon

18 March 2006
20:15

Report

Australia	104–26	Mozambique
Scoring by quarter: 21–7, 20–3, 33–12, 30–4
Pts: Jackson 23; Rebs: Grima, Whittle 8 Asts: Phillips, Snell 7		Pts: Muianga 8 Rebs: Gimo 9 Asts: Manhonga, Tomas Junior 1

Bendigo Stadium, Bendigo

19 March 2006
18:00

Report

Australia	95–43	England
Scoring by quarter: 21–17, 26–11, 22–8, 26–7
Pts: Jackson 31; Rebs: Whittle 11; Asts: Phillips 6		Pts: Boston 12; Rebs: Boston 7 Asts: D'Hondt, Thackray 2

Geelong Arena, Geelong

Semifinal

21 March 2006
13:45

Report

Australia	105–49	Nigeria
Scoring by quarter: 33–5, 16–10, 30–16, 26–18
Pts: Jackson 37; Rebs: Jackson 8 Asts: Cross 9		Pts: Akiode, Ojelabi 10; Rebs: Sadiq 9 Asts: Adibeli, James 2

Melbourne Multi Purpose Venue, Melbourne

Gold medal match

23 March 2006
20:15

Report

Australia	77–39	New Zealand
Scoring by quarter: 23–11, 15–8, 22–6, 17–14
Pts: Jackson 23; Rebs: Jackson 11; Asts: Summerton 4		Pts: Loffhagen 8 Rebs: Loffhagen 13; Asts: McMeeken-Ruscoe 8

Melbourne Multi Purpose Venue, Melbourne

== Boxing ==
Athlete	Event	Round 1	Round 2	Quarterfinals	Semifinals	Final	
Athlete	Event	Opposition Result	Opposition Result	Opposition Result	Opposition Result	Opposition Result	Rank
Emmanuel Fernando	Light flyweight	Bye	(Malaysia) Mohamad; L 13–28	Did not advance			
Bradley Hore	Flyweight	Bye	(England) Broadhurst; L 18–26	Did not advance			
Nathan di Carlo	Bantamweight	(Sri Lanka) Wanniarachchi; L 15–21	Did not advance				
Luke Jackson	Featherweight	(Namibia) Ndokosho; W 17–9	(Jamaica) Walters; W 12–5	(Uganda) Bogere; W 18–12	(Pakistan) Mehrullah; L 13–20	Did not advance	3rd place, bronze medalist(s)
Leonardo Zappavigna	Lightweight	(Scotland) Prince; W 33–13	(Botswana) Gaasite; W 34–15	(Tanzania) Matumla; W RSCOS	(England) Gavin; L RSCOS	Did not advance	3rd place, bronze medalist(s)
Todd Kidd	Light Welterweight	(India) Pun; W 31–19	(Canada) Bizier; W 30–13	(England) Russan; L 26–33	Did not advance		
O'Mahony	Welterweight	Bye	(South Africa) Mwelase; L RSC	Did not advance			
Jarrod Fletcher	Middleweight	Bye	(Ghana) Obodai; W 30–10	(Scotland) McEwan; W 27–10	(England) DeGale; W 17–13	(Canada) Stevenson; W 34–18	1st place, gold medalist(s)
Ben McEachran	Light heavyweight	Bye	(Jamaica) Gavin; W RSC	(Canada) Hunter; W 33–15	(Scotland) Anderson; L RSCOS	Did not advance	3rd place, bronze medalist(s)
Brad Pitt	Heavyweight	Bye	(England) Price; W 16–12	(Kenya) Wasao; W RSCOS	(Ghana) Yekeni; W 25–13	(India) Singh; W 25–10	1st place, gold medalist(s)
Steven Rudic	Super heavyweight	—N/a	Bye	(Tonga) Maama; W RSCOS	(Wales) Evans; L RSCOS	Did not advance	3rd place, bronze medalist(s)

== Cycling ==
=== Road ===
Men

Athlete	Event	Time	Rank
Allan Davis	Road Race	4:05:21	3rd place, bronze medalist(s)
Peter Dawson	Road Race	DNF	
Ben Day	Road Race	DNF	
Mathew Hayman	Road Race	4:05:09	1st place, gold medalist(s)
Aaron Kemps	Road Race	DNF	
William Walker	Road Race	4:05:47	14
Ben Day	Time trial	49:01.67	2nd place, silver medalist(s)
Nathan O'Neill	Time trial	48:37.29	1st place, gold medalist(s)

Women

Athlete	Event	Time	Rank
Kate Bates	Road race	2:59:39	18
Natalie Bates	Road race	2:56:08	1st place, gold medalist(s)
Sara Carrigan	Road race	2:59:27	7
Rochelle Gilmore	Road race	2:59:32	10
Olivia Gollan	Road race	2:59:29	9
Oenone Wood	Road race	2:59:13	2nd place, silver medalist(s)
Sara Carrigan	Time trial	38:00.32	3rd place, bronze medalist(s)
Kathy Watt	Time trial	37:56.07	2nd place, silver medalist(s)
Oenone Wood	Time trial	37:40.87	1st place, gold medalist(s)

=== Track ===
Team sprint

Athlete	Event	Qualification		Final	
Athlete	Event	Opposition Time Speed (km/h)	Rank	Opposition Time Speed (km/h)	Rank
Ryan Bayley; Shane Perkins; Shane Kelly	Men's	(New Zealand) New Zealand; 44.597; 60.542	3 Q	(New Zealand) New Zealand; 44.719; 60.377	3rd place, bronze medalist(s)

Sprint

Athlete	Event	Qualification		Round 1	Repechage 1	Quarterfinals	Semifinals	Final	
Athlete	Event	Time Speed (km/h)	Rank	Opposition Time Speed (km/h)	Opposition Time Speed (km/h)	Opposition Time	Opposition Time	Opposition Time	Rank
Ryan Bayley	Men's	10.407; 69.184	3 Q	(New Zealand) Grace; W 11.069; 65.046	—N/a	(Scotland) Librizzi; W 11.094, W 10.922	(England) Crampton; W 10.771, W 11.104	(Scotland) Edgar; W 11.273, W 10.639	1st place, gold medalist(s)
Shane Perkins	Men's	10.703; 67.270	8 Q	(Canada) Smith; L	(New Zealand) Grace (New Zealand) Seddon; L	Did not advance			
Anna Meares	Women's	11.700; 61.538	2 Q	(New Zealand) Carswell; W 12.433; 57.910	—N/a		(Australia) K. Meares; W 12.014, W 12.430	(England) Pendleton; L, W 12.001, L	2nd place, silver medalist(s)
Kerrie Meares	Women's	11.725; 61.407	3 Q	(New Zealand) Williams; W 12.288; 58.593	—N/a		(Australia) A. Meares; L, L	(New Zealand) Williams; W 12.457, W 12.074	3rd place, bronze medalist(s)

Pursuit

Athlete	Event	Qualification		Final	
Athlete	Event	Time	Rank	Opponent Results	Rank
Matthew Goss; Ashley Hutchinson; Mark Jamieson; Stephen Wooldridge	Men's team	4:06.522	2 Q	(England) England; 4:05.494	2nd place, silver medalist(s)
Mark Jamieson	Men's individual	4:30.399	7	Did not advance	
Peter Dawson	Men's individual	4:34.269	10	Did not advance	
Kate Bates	Women's individual	3:34.471	2 Q	3:37.089	2nd place, silver medalist(s)
Katie Mactier	Women's individual	3:30.290	1 Q	3:35.196	1st place, gold medalist(s)
Alexis Rhodes	Women's individual	3:44.614	7	Did not advance	

Keirin

Athlete	Event	1st Round	2nd Round	Final
Athlete	Event	Rank	Rank	Rank
Ryan Bayley	Men's	1 Q	1 Q	1st place, gold medalist(s)
Shane Kelly	Men's	1 Q	1 Q	4
Ben Kersten	Men's	1 Q	3 Q	REL

Time trial

Athlete	Event	Time	Rank
Ben Kersten	Men's 1 km	1:01.815	1st place, gold medalist(s)
Anna Meares	Women's 500 m	34.326	1st place, gold medalist(s)
Kerrie Meares	Women's 500 m	35.210	3rd place, bronze medalist(s)

Points race

Athlete	Event	Qualification		Final	
Athlete	Event	Points	Rank	Points	Rank
Peter Dawson	Men's	6	8 Q	70	6
Sean Finning	Men's	34	1 Q	137	1st place, gold medalist(s)
Kate Bates	Women's	—N/a		30	1st place, gold medalist(s)
Rochelle Gilmore	Women's	—N/a		21	2nd place, silver medalist(s)
Alexis Rhodes	Women's	—N/a		2	9

Scratch race

Athlete	Event	Qualification	Final
Sean Finning	Men's	6 Q	DNS
Ashley Hutchinson	Men's	3 Q	2nd place, silver medalist(s)
Ben Kersten	Men's	8 Q	13

=== Mountain bike ===
Athlete	Event	Time	Rank
Joshua Fleming	Men's	2:20:14	7
Chris Jongewaard	Men's	2:15:08	4
Sid Taberlay	Men's	2:17:18	6
Claire Baxter	Women's	OVL	
Emma Colson	Women's	2:06:07	7
Dellys Starr	Women's	2:02:12	5

== Diving ==
Men

Athlete	Event	Premilinary		Final		Total	
Athlete	Event	Points	Rank	Points	Rank	Points	Rank
Steven Barnett	1 m springboard	377.10	3	400.75	3	777.85	3rd place, bronze medalist(s)
Matthew Mitcham	1 m springboard	357.95	5	369.20	5	727.15	5
Scott Robertson	1 m springboard	338.35	7	351.30	8	689.65	7
Steven Barnett	3 m springboard	428.25	4	441.15	3	869.40	3rd place, bronze medalist(s)
Matthew Mitcham	3 m springboard	412.65	6	413.50	4	826.15	4
Robert Newbery	3 m springboard	446.00	2	460.30	2	906.30	2nd place, silver medalist(s)
Mathew Helm	10 m platform	532.20	2	533.40	1	1085.60	1st place, gold medalist(s)
Matthew Mitcham	10 m platform	492.05	4	472.05	5	964.10	5
Robert Newbery	10 m platform	466.40	5	524.05	2	990.45	4
Steven Barnett; Robert Newbery	3 m synchronised springboard	—N/a				421.35	3rd place, bronze medalist(s)
Matthew Mitcham; Scott Robertson	3 m synchronised springboard	—N/a				401.94	4
Mathew Helm; Robert Newbery	10 m synchronised platform	—N/a				440.58	1st place, gold medalist(s)

Women

Athlete	Event	Premilinary		Final		Total	
Athlete	Event	Points	Rank	Points	Rank	Points	Rank
Kathryn Blackshaw	1 m springboard	267.95	5 Q	276.45	3	544.40	3rd place, bronze medalist(s)
Sharleen Stratton	1 m springboard	297.65	2 Q	298.80	2	596.45	2nd place, silver medalist(s)
Kathryn Blackshaw	3 m springboard	304.40	4 Q	324.60	3	630.00	3rd place, bronze medalist(s)
Chantelle Newbery	3 m springboard	325.15	2 Q	356.15	2	681.30	2nd place, silver medalist(s)
Sharleen Stratton	3 m springboard	282.55	8 Q	324.25	4	606.80	5
Chantelle Newbery	10 m platform	366.85	2	366.70	3	733.55	2nd place, silver medalist(s)
Loudy Tourky	10 m platform	375.05	1	362.70	4	737.75	1st place, gold medalist(s)
Melissa Wu	10 m platform	303.20	6	367.20	2	670.40	5
Kathryn Blackshaw; Chantelle Newbery	3 m synchronised springboard	—N/a				248.64	4
Briony Cole; Sharleen Stratton	3 m synchronised springboard	—N/a				296.07	1st place, gold medalist(s)
Alex Croak; Melissa Wu	10 m synchronised platform	—N/a				309.90	2nd place, silver medalist(s)
Chantelle Newbery; Loudy Tourky	10 m synchronised platform	—N/a				317.58	1st place, gold medalist(s)

== Field hockey ==
=== Men's tournament ===
1. Jamie Dwyer
2. Liam de Young
4. Michael McCann
6. Robert Hammond
7. Nathan Eglington
9. Mark Knowles
13. Luke Doerner
14. Grant Schubert
15. Bevan George
18. Stephen Lambert
21. Aaron Hopkins
23. Matthew Wells
24. Travis Brooks
25. Brent Livermore
26. Dean Butler
30. Stephen Mowlam

Group play

Team	P	W	L	D	F	A	Pts
Australia	4	4	0	0	20	5	12
England	4	3	1	0	13	10	9
New Zealand	4	2	2	0	14	10	6
Scotland	4	1	3	0	4	15	3
Canada	4	0	4	0	3	16	0

17 March 2006
19:00

Australia	5–1	Scotland
Wells 11'; Butler 25'; Doerner 32'; Brooks 62'; Livermore 66'	Report	Stott 13'

Umpires:
Colin Hutchinson (IRL)
Javed Shaikh (IND)
Nathan Stagno (GIB)

19 March 2006
16:00

Australia	5–1	Canada
McCann; George; Eglington	Report	Wettlaufer

Umpires:
Colin Hutchinson (IRL)
Gary Simmonds (RSA)
Nathan Stagno (GIB)

21 March 2006
10:30

Australia	5–1	England
Eglington 2', 33', 62'; Livermore 42', 47'	Report	Tindall 55'

Umpires:
Colin Hutchinson (IRL)
Gary Simmonds (RSA)
Javed Shaikh (IND)

22 March 2006
18:00

Australia	5–2	New Zealand
Knowles 40' de Young 54'; Doerner 61'; Schubert 64'; Dwyer 65'	Report	Brooks 52'; Child 56'

Umpires:
Ravinderpal Singh (MAS)
Colin Hutchinson (IRL)
Christopher Wilson (CAN)

Semifinal

24 March 2006
11:00

Australia	6–0	Malaysia
Livermore 31', 42'; Dwyer 51'; Doerner 57', 70' de Young 67'	Report

Umpires:
Gerald Curran (SCO)
Colin Hutchinson (IRL)
Nathan Stagno (GIB)

Gold medal match

26 March 2006
13:00

Australia	3–0	Pakistan
de Young 18'; Doerner 58'; Dwyer 61'	Report

Umpires:
Gerald Curran (SCO)
Colin Hutchinson (IRL)
Gary Simmonds (RSA)

=== Women's tournament ===
1. Toni Cronk
2. Suzie Faulkner
3. Karen Smith
7. Kim Walker
9. Rebecca Sanders
10. Kate Hollywood
11. Emily Halliday
12. Madonna Blyth
13. Wendy Beattie
14. Nicole Arrold
15. Kobie McGurk
17. Rachel Imison
24. Angie Skirving
25. Melanie Twitt
30. Sarah Taylor
32. Nikki Hudson

Group play

Team	P	W	L	D	F	A	Pts
Australia	4	4	0	0	27	2	12
India	4	2	1	1	18	7	7
Malaysia	4	2	2	0	7	15	6
South Africa	4	1	2	1	7	8	4
Nigeria	4	0	4	0	1	28	0

16 March 2006
18:00

Australia	4–2	India
Beattie 1'; Smith 23'; Sanders 41'; Skirving 70'	Report	Lakra 13'; Kharab 22'

Umpires:
Sarah Garnett (NZL)
Alison Hill (ENG)
Renate Peters (GER)

17 March 2006
21:00

Australia	8–0	Malaysia
Sanders 7', 48'; Arrold 23'; Hollywood 23'; Hudson 28'; Faulkner 47'; Blyth 56'; Skirving 64'	Report

Umpires:
Sarah Garnett (NZL)
Corrine Cornelius (RSA)
Renate Peters (GER)

19 March 2006
11:00

Australia	12–0	Nigeria
Blyth 1'; Hudson; Arrold; Skirving; Halliday; Beattie; Taylor; Smith; Hollywood	Report

Umpires:
Wendy Stewart (CAN)
Corrine Cornelius (RSA)
Tracy Wrigley (NZL)

21 March 2006
13:30

Australia	3–0	South Africa
Faulkner 12'; Arrold 50'; Skirving 62'	Report

Umpires:
Alison Hill (ENG)
Gina Spitaleri (ITA)
Renate Peters (GER)

Semifinal

23 March 2006
11:00

Australia	3–0	England
Hollywood 28'; Halliday 36'; Faulkner 69'	Report

Umpires:
Sarah Garnett (NZL)
Anne McRae (SCO)
Wendy Stewart (CAN)

Gold medal match

25 March 2006
13:00

Australia	1–0	India
Hudson 63'	Report

Umpires:
Sarah Garnett (NZL)
Anne McRae (SCO)
Alison Hill (ENG)

== Gymnastics ==
=== Artistic ===
Men
Team

Athlete	Event	Final								Total	Rank
Athlete	Event	Apparatus						Total	Rank	Total	Rank
Athlete	Event	F	PH	R	V	PB	HB	Total	Rank	Total	Rank
Damian Istria	Team	14.400		15.350 Q	15.600		14.450 Q	59.800	36	268.850	2nd place, silver medalist(s)
Joshua Jefferis	Team	14.900 Q	13.850	15.850 Q	16.100	14.800 Q	14.500	90.000	1 Q	268.850	2nd place, silver medalist(s)
Samuel Offord	Team	14.550 Q	12.750		16.200 Q	13.100	14.650 Q	71.250	28	268.850	2nd place, silver medalist(s)
Philippe Rizzo	Team	13.250	14.350 Q	14.700	15.800	15.150 Q	12.800	86.050	8 Q	268.850	2nd place, silver medalist(s)
Prashanth Sellathurai	Team		15.350 Q	14.600		13.900		43.850	43	268.850	2nd place, silver medalist(s)

Individual finals

Athlete	Final												Total	Rank
Athlete	Apparatus												Total	Rank
Athlete	F		PH		R		V		PB		HB		Total	Rank
Athlete	Score	Rank	Score	Rank	Score	Rank	Score	Rank	Score	Rank	Score	Rank	Total	Rank
Damian Istria	—N/a				15.700	2nd place, silver medalist(s)	—N/a				15.600	1st place, gold medalist(s)	—N/a	
Joshua Jefferis	14.3	6	—N/a		15.825	1st place, gold medalist(s)	—N/a		14.8	3rd place, bronze medalist(s)	—N/a			
Joshua Jefferis	14.500		13.750		15.700		16.050		14.650		14.800		89.450	1st place, gold medalist(s)
Samuel Offord	14.325	5	—N/a				15.862	3rd place, bronze medalist(s)	—N/a		14.625	5	—N/a	
Philippe Rizzo	—N/a		12.875	8	—N/a				15.275	2nd place, silver medalist(s)	—N/a			
Philippe Rizzo	13.000		13.650		14.850		15.700		15.250		15.750		88.200	3rd place, bronze medalist(s)
Prashanth Sellathurai	—N/a		15.600	2nd place, silver medalist(s)	—N/a									

Women
Team

Athlete	Event	Final						Total	Rank
Athlete	Event	Apparatus				Total	Rank	Total	Rank
Athlete	Event	V	UB	B	F	Total	Rank	Total	Rank
Ashleigh Brennan	Team			14.150	14.050 Q	28.200	42	172.600	1st place, gold medalist(s)
Hollie Dykes	Team	14.800	14.250	15.500 Q	14.000 Q	58.550	1 Q	172.600	1st place, gold medalist(s)
Naomi Russell	Team	14.400 Q	14.350 Q			28.750	41	172.600	1st place, gold medalist(s)
Monette Russo	Team	14.250	14.800 Q	14.550 Q	13.500	57.100	2 Q	172.600	1st place, gold medalist(s)
Chloe Sims	Team	14.050 Q	13.200	13.950	11.850	53.050	9 Q	172.600	1st place, gold medalist(s)

Individual finals

Athlete	Final								Total	Rank
Athlete	Apparatus								Total	Rank
Athlete	V		UB		B		F		Total	Rank
Athlete	Score	Rank	Score	Rank	Score	Rank	Score	Rank	Total	Rank
Ashleigh Brennan	—N/a						13.925	2nd place, silver medalist(s)	—N/a	
Hollie Dykes	—N/a				14.925	2nd place, silver medalist(s)	14.650	1st place, gold medalist(s)	—N/a	
Hollie Dykes	13.800		13.700		14.850		13.450		55.800	3rd place, bronze medalist(s)
Naomi Russell	14.137	3rd place, bronze medalist(s)	14.525	4	—N/a					
Monette Russo	—N/a		14.850	3rd place, bronze medalist(s)	13.850	4	—N/a			
Monette Russo	Withdrew									
Chloe Sims	14.062	5	—N/a							
Chloe Sims	14.200		14.750		14.550		13.600		57.100	1st place, gold medalist(s)

=== Rhythmic ===
Team

Athlete	Event	Final						Total	Rank
Athlete	Event	Apparatus				Total	Rank	Total	Rank
Athlete	Event	Rope	Ball	Clubs	Ribbon	Total	Rank	Total	Rank
Naazmi Johnston	Team	11.700 Q	12.675 Q	12.150 Q	11.275 Q	47.800	6 Q	117.175	3rd place, bronze medalist(s)
Amanda Lee See	Team	9.350	10.150	10.900	9.600	40.000	17	117.175	3rd place, bronze medalist(s)
Kimberly Mason	Team	11.950 Q	12.625 Q	13.075 Q	10.675	48.325	5 Q	117.175	3rd place, bronze medalist(s)

Individual finals

Athlete	Final								Total	Rank
Athlete	Apparatus								Total	Rank
Athlete	Rope		Ball		Clubs		Ribbon		Total	Rank
Athlete	Score	Rank	Score	Rank	Score	Rank	Score	Rank	Total	Rank
Naazmi Johnston	12.275	6	12.575	6	12.450	5	11.650	6	—N/a	
Naazmi Johnston	12.125		12.825		12.200		11.550		48.700	4
Kimberly Mason	12.250	7	13.875	2nd place, silver medalist(s)	12.825	3rd place, bronze medalist(s)	—N/a			
Kimberly Mason	12.375		12.150		12.800		11.275		48.600	5

== Lawn bowls ==
Men

Athlete	Event	Group stage						Quarterfinals	Semifinals	Final / BM	
Athlete	Event	Opposition Score	Opposition Score	Opposition Score	Opposition Score	Opposition Score	Rank	Opposition Score	Opposition Score	Opposition Score	Rank
Kelvin Kerkow	Singles	(Namibia) Calitz; W 10–5, 16–4	(Malaysia) Abdullah; W 11–6, 4–10, 2–0	(Papua New Guinea) Juni; L 8–4, 6–10, 1–2	(Samoa) Leautuli; W 17–2, 3–11, 2–0	(Northern Ireland) McHugh; W 7–5, 10–5	1 Q	(Zambia) Nkole; W 9–2, 10–6	(England) Farish; W 7–7, 10–8	(Wales) Weale; W 7–4, 2–9, 2–1	1st place, gold medalist(s)
Barrie Lester; Nathan Rice	Pairs	(Namibia) Namibia; W 15–2, 7–7	(New Zealand) New Zealand; W 5–5, 9–9, 2–1	(Malawi) Malawi; W 15–3, 11–4	Malaysia; W 14–6, 7–10, 2–1	—N/a	1 Q	(Fiji) Fiji; W 8–5, 12–3	England; L 7–12, 5–9	Malta; W 9–5, 7–7	3rd place, bronze medalist(s)
Bill Cornehls; Wayne Turley; Mark Casey	Triples	(Kenya) Kenya; L 7–5, 9–10, 0–2	(Niue) Niue; W 18–2, 10–6	(Canada) Canada; W 8–8, 10–8	(Malta) Malta; W 13–4, 12–4	—N/a	1 Q	(New Zealand) New Zealand; W 12–5, 5–7, 2–0	(South Africa) South Africa; W 8–3, 14–2	(Northern Ireland) Northern Ireland; W 8–6, 10–4	1st place, gold medalist(s)

Women

Athlete	Event	Group stage									Quarterfinals	Semifinals	Final / BM	
Athlete	Event	Opposition Score	Opposition Score	Opposition Score	Opposition Score	Opposition Score	Opposition Score	Opposition Score	Opposition Score	Rank	Opposition Score	Opposition Score	Opposition Score	Rank
Maria Rigby	Singles	(Norfolk Island) Sanchez; W 7–3, 7–7	(Canada) McElroy; W 10–4, 11–3	(Wales) Morgan; W 7–9, 16–2, 2–0	(Jersey) Bisson; L 9–6, 8–9, 0–2	—N/a				2 Q	(Northern Ireland) Johnston; L 3–11, 10–4, 1–2	Did not advance		
Lynsey Armitage; Karen Murphy	Pairs	Norfolk Island; W 11–4, 18–3	(Eswatini) Swaziland; W 11–8, 9–6	Malaysia; W 10–9, 8–4	Canada; W 12–6, 20–0	South Africa; W 8–6, 7–6	England; L 16–3, 6–8, 1–2	Zambia; L 7–9, 7–11	Scotland; W 8–6, 11–3	1 Q	Northern Ireland; W 10–6, 9–12, 2–0	New Zealand; W 9–6, 2–11, 2–0	Scotland; W 11–7, 13–3	1st place, gold medalist(s)
Noi Tucker; Roma Dunn; Ceriann Davies	Triples	Samoa; W 13–10, 21–3	Cook Islands; W 13–6, 11–5	Jersey; W7–12, 15–2, 2–0	Botswana; W 11–4, 6–6	Norfolk Island; W 11–4, 7–6	Canada; W 11–9, 20–1	New Zealand; W 5–9, 8–3, 2–1	—N/a	1 Q	Scotland; W 7–7, 13–5	England; W 10–6, 7–6	Malaysia; L 12–12, 4–13	2nd place, silver medalist(s)

== Netball ==
With a team captained by Sharelle McMahon and coached by Norma Plummer, Australia finished as silver medallists in the netball at the 2006 Commonwealth Games. In the gold medal match they lost 60–55 to New Zealand.

Pool 2

Friday 17 March; 20:30 (UTC+11)	Report; Stats	Wales	22–78	Australia	Umpires: Pauline Sciascia; Chris Campbell; Reserve umpire: Bobbi Brown
Friday 17 March; 20:30 (UTC+11)	Report; Stats	Scoring by quarter: 4-17, 7-22, 7-19, 4-20			Umpires: Pauline Sciascia; Chris Campbell; Reserve umpire: Bobbi Brown
Friday 17 March; 20:30 (UTC+11)	Report; Stats	Rebecca James 13/22 (59%); Rhiannon Ace 5/9 (56%); Nicola Lewis 3/7 (43%); Jamilla Abbott 1/3 (33%)		Susan Pratley 25/27 (93%); Sharelle McMahon 20/20 (100%); Catherine Cox 20/28 (71%); Megan Dehn 13/16 (81%)	Umpires: Pauline Sciascia; Chris Campbell; Reserve umpire: Bobbi Brown

Sunday 19 March; 13:00 (UTC+11)	Report; Stats	Australia	70–27	Barbados	Umpires: Bronwyn Meek; Bill Alexander; Reserve umpire: Bobbi Brown
Sunday 19 March; 13:00 (UTC+11)	Report; Stats	Scoring by quarter: 22-6, 16-6, 15-10, 17-5			Umpires: Bronwyn Meek; Bill Alexander; Reserve umpire: Bobbi Brown
Sunday 19 March; 13:00 (UTC+11)	Report; Stats	Catherine Cox 30/37 (81%); Susan Pratley 20/21 (95%); Sharelle McMahon 15/17 (88%); Megan Dehn 5/9 (56%)		Lydia Bishop 14/23 (61%); Laurel Browne 13/15 (87%)	Umpires: Bronwyn Meek; Bill Alexander; Reserve umpire: Bobbi Brown

Tuesday 21 March; 15:00 (UTC+11)	Report; Stats	Australia	78–47	Samoa	Umpires: Anne Abraitis; Bobbi Brown; Reserve umpire: Pauline Sciascia
Tuesday 21 March; 15:00 (UTC+11)	Report; Stats	Scoring by quarter: 23-9, 23-14, 14-11, 18-13			Umpires: Anne Abraitis; Bobbi Brown; Reserve umpire: Pauline Sciascia
Tuesday 21 March; 15:00 (UTC+11)	Report; Stats	Susan Pratley 28/30 (93%); Catherine Cox 20/25 (80%); Sharelle McMahon 18/20 (90%); Megan Dehn 12/13 (92%)		Monika Fuimaono 27/36 (75%); Malu Fa'asavalu 13/21 (62%); Cathrine Latu 7/10 (70%)	Umpires: Anne Abraitis; Bobbi Brown; Reserve umpire: Pauline Sciascia

Wednesday 22 March; 18:30 (UTC+11)	Report; Stats	Australia	54–54	Jamaica	Umpires: Bronwyn Meek; Amanda Nottingham; Reserve umpire: Bobbi Brown
Wednesday 22 March; 18:30 (UTC+11)	Report; Stats	Scoring by quarter: 16-11, 11-13, 16-10, 11-20			Umpires: Bronwyn Meek; Amanda Nottingham; Reserve umpire: Bobbi Brown
Wednesday 22 March; 18:30 (UTC+11)	Report; Stats	Sharelle McMahon 27/33 (82%); Susan Pratley 14/18 (78%); Catherine Cox 13/17 (76%)		Elaine Davis 37/40 (93%); Simone Forbes 17/19 (89%)	Umpires: Bronwyn Meek; Amanda Nottingham; Reserve umpire: Bobbi Brown

Thursday 23 March; 14:00 (UTC+11)	Report; Stats	Singapore	19–107	Australia	Umpires: Carolene Logan; Chris Campbell; Reserve umpire: Bronwyn Meek
Thursday 23 March; 14:00 (UTC+11)	Report; Stats	Scoring by quarter: 4-25, 4-28, 4-26, 7-28			Umpires: Carolene Logan; Chris Campbell; Reserve umpire: Bronwyn Meek
Thursday 23 March; 14:00 (UTC+11)	Report; Stats	Tan Hui Yan 9/18 (50%); Jeanine Heng Wei Ping 5/9 (56%); Li Ling 4/5 (80%); Chen Hui Fen 1/2 (50%); Tan Lee Hiang Wendy 0/1 (0%)		Catherine Cox 44/51 (86%); Megan Dehn 35/42 (83%); Sharelle McMahon 17/20 (85%); Susan Pratley 11/11 (100%)	Umpires: Carolene Logan; Chris Campbell; Reserve umpire: Bronwyn Meek

Table

Pos	Team	P	W	D	L	GF	GA	GD	Pts
1	Australia	5	4	1	0	387	169	+218	9
2	Jamaica	5	4	1	0	324	174	+150	9
3	Samoa	5	3	0	2	264	254	+10	6
4	Wales	5	2	0	3	185	271	-86	4
5	Barbados	5	2	0	3	183	279	-96	4
6	Singapore	5	0	0	5	150	346	-196	0

Qualified for Semi-finals
Qualified for Classification

Semi-final

Saturday 25 March; 20:30 (UTC+11	Report; Stats	Australia	52–40	England	Umpires: Amanda Nottingham; Chris Campbell; Reserve umpire: Bronwyn Meek
Saturday 25 March; 20:30 (UTC+11	Report; Stats	Scoring by quarter: 14-8, 11-9, 10-7, 17-16			Umpires: Amanda Nottingham; Chris Campbell; Reserve umpire: Bronwyn Meek
Saturday 25 March; 20:30 (UTC+11	Report; Stats	Sharelle McMahon 27/31 (87%); Susan Pratley 15/18 (83%); Catherine Cox 10/14 (71%)		Abby Teare 15/24 (63%); Louisa Brownfield 9/14 (64%); Pamela Cookey 9/15 (60%); Rachel Dunn 7/11 (64%)	Umpires: Amanda Nottingham; Chris Campbell; Reserve umpire: Bronwyn Meek

Gold medal match

Sunday 26 March; 16:00 (UTC+11)	Stats	New Zealand	60–55	Australia	Umpires: Chris Campbell; Marion Johnson-Hurley; Reserve umpire: Bill Alexander
Sunday 26 March; 16:00 (UTC+11)	Stats	Scoring by quarter: 19-14, 17-15, 10-12, 14-14			Umpires: Chris Campbell; Marion Johnson-Hurley; Reserve umpire: Bill Alexander
Sunday 26 March; 16:00 (UTC+11)	Stats	Irene van Dyk 44/49 (90%); Belinda Colling 16/18 (89%)		Catherine Cox 31/38 (82%); Sharelle McMahon 22/28 (79%); Susan Pratley 2/2 (100%)	Umpires: Chris Campbell; Marion Johnson-Hurley; Reserve umpire: Bill Alexander

Squad

Australia national netball team – 2006 Commonwealth Games roster
Players
Coaches

Pos.	Name	Age - DOB	Ht.	Club	Club nat.
Natalie Avellino	WA, GA, GS	15 December 1970 (aged 35)	1.77 m (5 ft 10 in)	Adelaide Thunderbirds	(Australia)	20
Alison Broadbent	GD, GK, WD	18 July 1975 (aged 30)	1.81 m (5 ft 11 in)	Sydney Swifts	(Australia)	28
Bianca Chatfield	GK, GD	2 April 1982 (aged 23)	1.88 m (6 ft 2 in)	Melbourne Phoenix	(Australia)	16
Catherine Cox (vc)	GS, GA	24 May 1976 (aged 29)	1.88 m (6 ft 2 in)	Sydney Swifts	(Australia)	50
Megan Dehn	GA, GS, WA	9 November 1974 (aged 31)	1.78 m (5 ft 10 in)	Sydney Swifts	(Australia)	15
Susan Fuhrmann	GK	30 July 1986 (aged 19)	1.96 m (6 ft 5 in)	AIS Canberra Darters	(Australia)	0
Selina Gilsenan	WD, C, WA	31 May 1978 (aged 27)	1.71 m (5 ft 7 in)	Sydney Swifts	(Australia)	6
Janine Ilitch	GK, GD	27 January 1972 (aged 34)	1.84 m (6 ft 0 in)	Melbourne Kestrels	(Australia)	44
Sharelle McMahon (c)	GA, GS	12 August 1977 (aged 28)	1.77 m (5 ft 10 in)	Melbourne Phoenix	(Australia)	72
Susan Pratley	GA, GS	23 March 1984 (aged 21)	1.80 m (5 ft 11 in)	AIS Canberra Darters	(Australia)	0
Jessica Shynn	C, WD	20 August 1982 (aged 23)	1.79 m (5 ft 10 in)	Perth Orioles	(Australia)	15
Natalie von Bertouch	C, WA	16 December 1982 (aged 23)	1.75 m (5 ft 9 in)	Adelaide Thunderbirds	(Australia)	9

Head coach

- Norma Plummer

Assistant coach

- Jane Searle

Manager:
Marg Molina
Physiotherapist:
Wayne Rodgers
Team Doctor:
Dr. Lyn Thew

Notes

- (c) – Captain
- (cc) – Co-captain
- (vc) – Vice-captain
- – Injury / maternity leave
- (TRP) – Temporary Replacement Player

== Rugby sevens ==
Name	Pos.	Height	Weight	Date of birth	Club
Scott Fava	Prop	1.89 m (6 ft 2 in)	103 kg (227 lb)	19 January 1976	Western Force
Josh Gamgee	Halfback, hooker	1.78 m (5 ft 10 in)	86 kg (190 lb)	13 June 1980	Gordon RFC
Matt Giteau	Fly-half, halfback	1.78 m (5 ft 10 in)	85 kg (187 lb)	29 September 1982	ACT Brumbies
Luke Inman	Centre	1.92 m (6 ft 4 in)	98 kg (216 lb)	27 December 1977	Sydney University Football Club
Chris Latham	Fullback, hooker	1.93 m (6 ft 4 in)	102 kg (225 lb)	8 September 1975	Queensland Reds
Shawn Mackay	Prop	1.96 m (6 ft 5 in)	102 kg (225 lb)	31 May 1982	Randwick DRUFC
Michael McVerry	Prop	1.96 m (6 ft 5 in)	102 kg (225 lb)	May 31, 1982	Randwick DRUFC
Damon Murphy	Fullback	1.74 m (5 ft 9 in)	80 kg (176 lb)	15 December 1983	Brothers Old Boys
Nick Reily	Fullback	1.86 m (6 ft 1 in)	88 kg (194 lb)	18 September 1980	West Harbour RFC
Cameron Shepherd	Fullback	1.89 m (6 ft 2 in)	97 kg (214 lb)	30 March 1984	Western Force
Lote Tuqiri	Fullback	1.91 m (6 ft 3 in)	103 kg (227 lb)	23 September 1979	NSW Waratahs
Brendan Williams	Fullback	1.75 m (5 ft 9 in)	79 kg (174 lb)	21 May 1978	Randwick DRUFC

Preliminary rounds

Team	P	W	D	L	PF	PA	Pts
England	3	3	0	0	110	17	9
Australia	3	2	0	1	113	31	7
Cook Islands	3	1	0	2	71	63	5
Sri Lanka	3	0	0	3	0	181	3

16 March 2006
13:14

Australia	73–0	Sri Lanka
Try: Chris Latham (3); Lote Tuqiri; Scott Fava (2); Matt Giteau (2); Michael McVerry; Damon Murphy; Cameron Shepherd; Con: Matt Giteau (8/9); Nick Reily (1/1); Brendan Williams (0/1)	Report

Telstra Dome, Melbourne
Referee: Christopher Rooney (NZL)

16 March 2006
19:06

Australia	28–19	Cook Islands
Try: Josh Gamgee; Nick Reily; Cameron Shepherd; Brendan Williams; Con: Matt Giteau (4/4)	Report	Try: Koiatu Koiatu; Adam Vardey (2); Con: Koiatu Koiatu (2/3)

Telstra Dome, Melbourne
Referee: Christian du Preez (RSA)

16 March 2006
22:12

Australia	12–14	England
Try: Chris Latham; Cameron Shepherd; Con: Matt Giteau (1/1); Brendan Williams (0/1)	Report	Try: Simon Amor; Tom Varndell; Con: Simon Amor (2/2))

Telstra Dome, Melbourne
Referee: Kevin Rowe (NZL)

Quarterfinal

17 March 2006
14:00

Australia	20–14	South Africa
Try: Lote Tuqiri; Cameron Shepherd; Shawn Mackay; Con: Matt Giteau (0/4)	Report	Try: Fabian Juries; Philip Burger; Con: Mzwandile Stick (2/2)

Telstra Dome, Melbourne
Referee: Christopher Rooney (NZL)

Semifinal

17 March 2006
19:28

Australia	19–21	New Zealand
Try: Lote Tuqiri; Josh Gamgee; Cameron Shepherd; Con: Matt Giteau (0/1); Nick Reily (2/2)	Report	Try: Tamati Ellison; Cory Jane; Amasio Valence; Con: Amasio Valence (3/3)

Telstra Dome, Melbourne
Referee: Robert Debney (ENG)

Bronze medal match

17 March 2006
21:22

Australia	17–24	Fiji
Try: Nick Reily; Brendan Williams; Con: Nick Reily (1/3)	Report	Try: Neumi Nanoko; Ratu Saukawa; Con: Waisale Serevi (2/3); William Rugby (0/1)

Telstra Dome, Melbourne
Attendance: 80 000
Referee: Kevin Rowe

== Shooting ==
Men

Athlete	Event	Qualification		Final	
Athlete	Event	Points	Rank	Points	Rank
Michael Diamond	Trap	115	9	Did not advance	
Adam Vella	Trap	115	9	Did not advance	
Michael Diamond; Adam Vella	Trap pairs	—N/a		189	1st place, gold medalist(s)
Russell Mark	Double trap	134	4 Q	178	4
Craig Trembath	Double trap	128	10	Did not advance	
Russell Mark; Craig Trembath	Double trap pairs	—N/a		186	1st place, gold medalist(s)
Clive Barton	Skeet	123	1 Q	147	2nd place, silver medalist(s)
George Barton	Skeet	118	4 Q	141	5
Clive Barton; George Barton	Skeet pairs	—N/a		185	3rd place, bronze medalist(s)
David Moore	10 m air pistol	568	12	Did not advance	
Daniel Repacholi	10 m air pistol	579	2 Q	676.8	4
David Moore; Daniel Repacholi	10 m air pistol pairs	—N/a		1144	3rd place, bronze medalist(s)
David Chapman	25 m rapid fire pistol	551	8	Did not advance	
Bruce Favell	25 m rapid fire pistol	532	13	Did not advance	
David Chapman; Bruce Favell	25 m rapid fire pistol pairs	—N/a		1116	2nd place, silver medalist(s)
Bob Dowling	25 m centre fire pistol	—N/a		566	8
David Moore	25 m centre fire pistol	—N/a		560	18
Bob Dowling; David Moore	25 m centre fire pistol pairs	—N/a		1125	7
David Moore	25 m standard pistol	—N/a		557	5
Bruce Quick	25 m standard pistol	—N/a		562	3rd place, bronze medalist(s)
David Moore; Bruce Quick	25 m standard pistol pairs	—N/a		1112	2nd place, silver medalist(s)
David Moore	50 m pistol	542	7 Q	637.6	6
Daniel Repacholi	50 m pistol	534	11	Did not advance	
David Moore; Daniel Repacholi	50 m pistol pairs	—N/a		1086	1st place, gold medalist(s)
Ben Burge	10 m air rifle	583	11	Did not advance	
Matt Inabinet	10 m air rifle	580	18	Did not advance	
Ben Burge; Matt Inabinet	10 m air rifle pairs	—N/a		1157	9
Michael Brown	50 m rifle 3 positions	1134	8 Q	1223.4	8
Ben Burge	50 m rifle 3 positions	1150	3 Q	1238.2	3rd place, bronze medalist(s)
Michael Brown; Ben Burge	50 m rifle 3 positions pairs	—N/a		2269	2nd place, silver medalist(s)
David Clifton	50 m rifle prone	558	13	Did not advance	
Warren Potent	50 m rifle prone	594	3 Q	695.1	5
David Clifton; Warren Potent	50 m rifle prone pairs	—N/a		1176	4

Women

Athlete	Event	Qualification		Final	
Athlete	Event	Points	Rank	Points	Rank
Suzy Balogh	Trap	62	10	Did not advance	
Deserie Baynes	Trap	67	5 Q	83	4
Suzy Balogh; Deserie Baynes	Trap pairs	—N/a		87	1st place, gold medalist(s)
Suzy Balogh	Double trap	—N/a		90	6
Susan Trindall	Double trap	—N/a		89	7
Suzy Balogh; Susan Trindall	Double trap pairs	—N/a		121	3rd place, bronze medalist(s)
Lauryn Mark	Skeet	68	3 Q	89	2nd place, silver medalist(s)
Natalia Rahman	Skeet	69	1 Q	89	4
Lauryn Mark; Natalia Rahman	Skeet pairs	—N/a		90	1st place, gold medalist(s)
Dina Aspandiyarova	10 m air pistol	386	1 Q	484.3	2nd place, silver medalist(s)
Lalita Yauhleuskaya	10 m air pistol	384	2 Q	484.8	1st place, gold medalist(s)
Dina Aspandiyarova; Lalita Yauhleuskaya	10 m air pistol pairs	—N/a		770	1st place, gold medalist(s)
Pamela McKenzie	25 m pistol	572	4 Q	772.3	3rd place, bronze medalist(s)
Lalita Yauhleuskaya	25 m pistol	582	1 Q	781.5	1st place, gold medalist(s)
Pamela McKenzie; Lalita Yauhleuskaya	25 m pistol pairs	—N/a		1134	2nd place, silver medalist(s)
Sue McCready	10 m air rifle	393	5 Q	495.3	5
Susannah Smith	10 m air rifle	384	19	Did not advance	
Sue McCready; Susannah Smith	10 m air rifle pairs	—N/a		777	4
Sue McCready	50 m rifle 3 positions	565	11	Did not advance	
Susannah Smith	50 m rifle 3 positions	567	9	Did not advance	
Sue McCready; Susannah Smith	50 m rifle 3 positions pairs	—N/a		1131	4
Kim Frazer	50 m rifle prone	—N/a		576	12
Susannah Smith	50 m rifle prone	—N/a		569	21
Kim Frazer; Susannah Smith	50 m rifle prone pairs	—N/a		1160	4

Open

Athlete	Event	Final	
Athlete	Event	Points	Rank
James Corbett	Full bore rifle	401.57	3rd place, bronze medalist(s)
Bruce Scott	Full bore rifle	403.60	1st place, gold medalist(s)
James Corbett; Bruce Scott	Full bore rifle pairs	593.74	2nd place, silver medalist(s)

== Squash ==
Men
Singles

Athlete	Round of 64	Round of 32	Round of 16	Quarterfinals	Semifinals	Final / BM	
Athlete	Opposition Score	Opposition Score	Opposition Score	Opposition Score	Opposition Score	Opposition Score	Rank
Stewart Boswell	Bye	(Northern Ireland) Richardson; W 9–4, 9–0, 9–4	(Australia) Anthony Ricketts; W 10–8, 9–2, 9–7	(England) Lee Beachill; L 4–9, 3–9, 3–9	Did not advance		
Joe Kneipp	(British Virgin Islands) Joe Chapman; W 9–0, 9–0, 9–1	(Malta) Joseph Desira; W 9–4, 9–1, 9–1	(Scotland) John White; L 6–9, 0–9, 2–9	Did not advance			
David Palmer	Bye	(Wales) David Evans; W 9–2, 9–4, 9–6	(Canada) Shahier Razik; W 9–2, 9–4, 9–6	(Scotland) John White; W 2–9, 10–8, 9–6, 9–0	(England) Lee Beachill; W 9–0, 9–4, 9–4	(England) Peter Nicol; L 5–9, 8–10, 9–4, 2–9	2nd place, silver medalist(s)
Anthony Ricketts	Bye	(Trinidad and Tobago) Colin Ramasra; W 9–0, 9–0, 9–1	(Australia) Stewart Boswell; L 8–10, 2–9, 7–9	Did not advance			

Doubles

Athlete	Group stage			Quarterfinals	Semifinals	Final / BM	
Athlete	Opposition Score	Opposition Score	Rank	Opposition Score	Opposition Score	Opposition Score	Rank
Stewart Boswell; Anthony Ricketts	(Guyana) Badrinath / Weithers; W W/O	(Kenya) Bains / Reel; W 9–4, 9–0, 9–7	1 Q	(South Africa) Durbach / Hansen; W 9–7, 6–9, 7–9, 9–7, 9–5	(New Zealand) Grayson / Knight; 9–6, 11–9, 11–9	(England) Beachill / Nicol; L 9–7, 7–9, 1–9, 8–10	2nd place, silver medalist(s)
Dan Jenson; David Palmer	(Pakistan) A. Khan / K. Khan; W 9–4, 9–4, 9–4	(Sri Lanka) Issadeen / Samarasinghe; W 9–1, 9–1, 9–5	1 Q	(Wales) Evans / Gough; W 9–6, 9–2, 7–9, 9–7	(England) Beachill / Nicol; L 9–5, 4–9, 6–9, 4–9	(New Zealand) Grayson / Knight; W 9–2, 9–4, 6–9, 9–6	3rd place, bronze medalist(s)

Women
Singles

Athlete	Round of 32	Round of 16	Quarterfinals	Semifinals	Final / BM	
Athlete	Opposition Score	Opposition Score	Opposition Score	Opposition Score	Opposition Score	Rank
Kasey Brown	(Scotland) Frania Gillen-Buchert; W 9–3, 9–0, 9–4	(Australia) Rachael Grinham; L 3–9, 1–9, 2–9	Did not advance			
Natalie Grinham	(Cayman Islands) Chantelle Day; W 9–0, 9–0, 9–1	(Malaysia) Tricia Chuah; W 7–9, 9–5, 9–3, 9–0	(Northern Ireland) Madeline Perry; W 9–1, 9–7, 4–9, 9–3	(New Zealand) Shelley Kitchen; W 10–8, 9–4, 9–2	(Australia) Rachael Grinham; W 2–9, 9–6, 9–1, 9–6	1st place, gold medalist(s)
Rachael Grinham	Bye	(Australia) Kasey Brown; W 9–3, 9–1, 9–2	(England) Linda Elriani; W 1–9, 9–5, 9–5, 9–3	(Malaysia) Nicol David; W 9–11, 9–7, 4–9, 9–6, 9–3	(Australia) Natalie Grinham; L 9–2, 6–9, 1–9, 6–9	2nd place, silver medalist(s)
Amelia Pittock	(Jamaica) Marlene West; W 9–1, 9–0, 9–1	(England) Tania Bailey; L 2–9, 2–9, 1–9	Did not advance			

Doubles

Athlete	Group stage					Semifinals	Final / BM	
Athlete	Opposition Score	Opposition Score	Opposition Score	Opposition Score	Rank	Opposition Score	Opposition Score	Rank
Kasey Brown; Amelia Pittock	(Scotland) Gillen-Buchert / Philip; W 9–4, 9–4, 9–2	(New Zealand) Kitchen / Leevey; L 9–7, 7–9, 9–2, 6–9, 6–9	(Sri Lanka) N. Guruge / T. Guruge; W 9–5, 9–1, 9–1	(England) Bailey / Botwright; L 9–7, 1–9, 3–9, 7–9	3	Did not advance		
Natalie Grinham; Rachael Grinham	(England) Duncalf / Waters; W 11–9, 9–3, 10–8	(Jamaica) Anderson / West; W 9–1, 9–1, 9–2	(New Zealand) Crome / Petera; W 9–4, 11–9, 7–9, 9–4	(Papua New Guinea) Guy / Webb; W 9–5, 9–3, 9–2	1 Q	(England) Bailey / Botwright; W 5–9, 9–3, 9–3, 9–6	(New Zealand) Kitchen / Leevey; W 1–9, 9–4, 9–3, 9–3	1st place, gold medalist(s)

Mixed
Doubles

Athlete	Group stage			Quarterfinals	Semifinals	Final / BM	
Athlete	Opposition Score	Opposition Score	Rank	Opposition Score	Opposition Score	Opposition Score	Rank
Natalie Grinham; Joe Kneipp	(Norfolk Island) Adams / Duncan; W 9–2, 9–1, 9–0	(Northern Ireland) Perry / Richardson; W 9–4, 12–10, 9–6	1 Q	(Wales) Malik / Jones; W 9–7, 7–9, 9–5, 9–5	(Australia) R. Grinham / Palmer; W 9–7, 9–7, 3–9, 3–9, 9–7	(England) Botwright / Willstrop; W 6–9, 9–6, 9–5, 9–6	1st place, gold medalist(s)
Rachael Grinham; David Palmer	(South Africa) Swartz / Leeuw; W 9–2, 9–4, 9–3	(Sri Lanka) N. Guruge / Samarasinghe; W 9–0, 9–4, 9–3	1 Q	(England) Waters / Grant; W 9–1, 9–6, 11–9	(Australia) N. Grinham / Kneipp; L 7–9, 7–9, 9–3, 9–3, 7–9	(New Zealand) Kitchen / Wilson; W 9–4, 9–6, 9–6	3rd place, bronze medalist(s)

== Swimming ==
Men

Athlete	Events	Heat		Semifinal		Final	
Athlete	Events	Time	Rank	Time	Rank	Time	Rank
Ashley Callus	50 m freestyle	22.90	6 Q	22.90	7 Q	22.71	8
Brett Hawke	50 m freestyle	22.72	3 Q	22.30	1 Q	22.31	3rd place, bronze medalist(s)
Eamon Sullivan	50 m freestyle	22.94	8 Q	23.03	8 Q	22.61	5
Ben Austin	50 m EAD freestyle	27.78	6 Q	—N/a		28.03	6
Matthew Cowdrey	50 m EAD freestyle	26.16	1 Q	—N/a		26.06	1st place, gold medalist(s)
Alex Harris	50 m EAD freestyle	29.93	7 Q	—N/a		30.56	8
Ashley Callus	100 m freestyle	50.44	8 Q	50.02	7 Q	49.78	6
Kenrick Monk	100 m freestyle	50.12	3 Q	49.92	5 Q	49.94	7
Eamon Sullivan	100 m freestyle	49.94	1 Q	49.37	3 Q	49.58	5
Sam Bramham	100 m EAD freestyle	1:00.17	5 Q	—N/a		1:00.15	6
Matthew Cowdrey	100 m EAD freestyle	57.97	1 Q	—N/a		56.73	1st place, gold medalist(s)
Ben Austin	100 m EAD freestyle	1:00.21	2 Q	—N/a		1:00.50	4
Nicholas Ffrost	200 m freestyle	1:49.33	8 Q	—N/a		1:50.00	8
Andrew Mewing	200 m freestyle	1:50.14	13	—N/a		Did not advance	
Kenrick Monk	200 m freestyle	1:49.61	9	—N/a		Did not advance	
Nicholas Ffrost	400 m freestyle	3:55.52	11	—N/a		Did not advance	
Craig Stevens	400 m freestyle	3:51.26	1 Q	—N/a		3:51.96	4
Travis Nederpelt	1500 m freestyle	15:36.40	3 Q	—N/a		15:41.38	7
Craig Stevens	1500 m freestyle	15:48.37	5 Q	—N/a		15:22.10	6
Andrew Lauterstein	50 m backstroke	26.03	5 Q	25.92	6 Q	26.05	7
Matt Welsh	50 m backstroke	25.66	3 Q	25.50	4 Q	25.34	4
Andrew Lauterstein	100 m backstroke	55.72	2 Q	55.77	6 Q	55.32	6
Matt Welsh	100 m backstroke	55.22	1 Q	54.82	1 Q	54.82	2nd place, silver medalist(s)
Brenton Rickard	50 m breaststroke	28.19	1 Q	28.13	1 Q	28.14	3rd place, bronze medalist(s)
Christian Sprenger	50 m breaststroke	28.39	3 Q	28.49	5 Q	28.62	6
Jim Piper	200 m breaststroke	1:02.79	9 Q	DSQ		Did not advance	
Brenton Rickard	200 m breaststroke	1:01.28	1 Q	1:01.40	2 Q	1:01.17	3rd place, bronze medalist(s)
Christian Sprenger	200 m breaststroke	1:01.90	2 Q	1:02.28	7 Q	1:01.99	6
Jim Piper	200 m breaststroke	2:15.52	2 Q	—N/a		2:12.26	3rd place, bronze medalist(s)
Brenton Rickard	200 m breaststroke	2:15.93	3 Q	—N/a		2:12.24	2nd place, silver medalist(s)
Christian Sprenger	200 m breaststroke	2:19.96	8 Q	—N/a		2:19.09	8
Michael Klim	50 m butterfly	24.04	3 Q	23.80	2 Q	23.74	3rd place, bronze medalist(s)
Matt Targett	50 m butterfly	23.91	2 Q	23.86	3 Q	DSQ	
Matt Welsh	50 m butterfly	24.18	4 Q	23.97	4 Q	23.63	2nd place, silver medalist(s)
Michael Klim	100 m butterfly	53.98	7 Q	52.86	1 Q	52.70	2nd place, silver medalist(s)
Adam Pine	100 m butterfly	53.72	3 Q	52.96	3 Q	53.25	5
Andrew Richards	100 m butterfly	54.56	9 Q	54.37	10	Did not advance	
Joshua Krogh	200 m butterfly	2:00.53	4 Q	—N/a		1:59.18	3rd place, bronze medalist(s)
Travis Nederpelt	200 m butterfly	1:57.36	1 Q	—N/a		1:57.26	2nd place, silver medalist(s)
Andrew Richards	200 m butterfly	2:00.79	6 Q	—N/a		2:01.64	7
Leith Brodie	200 m individual medley	2:02.74	3 Q	—N/a		2:01.84	4
Travis Nederpelt	400 m individual medley	4:24.63	5 Q	—N/a		4:17.24	3rd place, bronze medalist(s)
Ashley Callus; Brett Hawke; Eamon Sullivan; Michael Klim	4 × 100 m freestyle relay	—N/a				3:15.54	2nd place, silver medalist(s)
Andrew Mewing; Joshua Krogh; Kenrick Monk; Nicholas Ffrost	4 × 200 m freestyle relay	—N/a				7:14.99	3rd place, bronze medalist(s)
Matt Welsh; Brenton Rickard; Michael Klim; Eamon Sullivan; Andrew Lauterstein*; Christian Sprenger*; Adam Pine*; Kenrick Monk*	4 × 100 m medley relay	3:41.47	1 Q	—N/a		3:34.37	1st place, gold medalist(s)

Women

Athlete	Events	Heat		Semifinal		Final	
Athlete	Events	Time	Rank	Time	Rank	Time	Rank
Jodie Henry	50 m freestyle	25.38	1 Q	25.32	1 Q	24.72	2nd place, silver medalist(s)
Libby Lenton	50 m freestyle	25.88	4 Q	25.50	3 Q	24.61	1st place, gold medalist(s)
Alice Mills	50 m freestyle	25.43	2 Q	25.40	2 Q	25.03	3rd place, bronze medalist(s)
Kat Lewis	50 m EAD freestyle	30.04	6 Q	—N/a		29.64	5
Annabelle Williams	50 m EAD freestyle	30.03	3 Q	—N/a		30.25	3rd place, bronze medalist(s)
Prudence Watt	50 m EAD freestyle	28.93	5 Q	—N/a		29.07	7
Jodie Henry	100 m freestyle	54.52	1 Q	54.11	1 Q	53.78	2nd place, silver medalist(s)
Libby Lenton	100 m freestyle	55.04	3 Q	54.68	2 Q	53.54	1st place, gold medalist(s)
Alice Mills	100 m freestyle	54.80	2 Q	55.08	3 Q	54.31	3rd place, bronze medalist(s)
Lichelle Clarke	100 m EAD freestyle	1:14.05	8 Q	—N/a		1:13.05	8
Kat Lewis	100 m EAD freestyle	1:05.81	7 Q	—N/a		1:04.43	5
Prudence Watt	100 m EAD freestyle	1:03.18	6 Q	—N/a		1:02.95	7
Bronte Barratt	200 m freestyle	2:00.64	6 Q	—N/a		1:59.33	4
Libby Lenton	200 m freestyle	2:00.16	3 Q	—N/a		1:57.51	2nd place, silver medalist(s)
Linda Mackenzie	200 m freestyle	2:00.11	2 Q	—N/a		1:59.49	5
Bronte Barratt	400 m freestyle	4:12.46	3 Q	—N/a		4:08.65	3rd place, bronze medalist(s)
Linda Mackenzie	400 m freestyle	4:13.97	6 Q	—N/a		4:09.81	4
Kylie Palmer	400 m freestyle	4:12.51	4 Q	—N/a		4:11.74	5
Melissa Gorman	800 m freestyle	8:39.28	3 Q	—N/a		8:30.79	2nd place, silver medalist(s)
Sarah Paton	800 m freestyle	8:44.12	5 Q	—N/a		8:45.35	6
Caroline South	800 m freestyle	8:51.12	7 Q	—N/a		8:46.30	7
Sophie Edington	50 m backstroke	29.21	2 Q	28.79	2 Q	28.42	1st place, gold medalist(s)
Giaan Rooney	50 m backstroke	28.58	1 Q	28.42	1 Q	28.43	2nd place, silver medalist(s)
Tayliah Zimmer	50 m backstroke	29.22	3 Q	28.97	3 Q	28.71	3rd place, bronze medalist(s)
Sophie Edington	100 m backstroke	1:01.32	1 Q	1:01.30	1 Q	1:00.93	1st place, gold medalist(s)
Giaan Rooney	100 m backstroke	1:02.88	6 Q	1:01.68	2 Q	1:01.42	2nd place, silver medalist(s)
Tayliah Zimmer	100 m backstroke	1:01.94	3 Q	1:02.48	5 Q	1:01.74	5
Sophie Edington	200 m backstroke	2:15.56	8 Q	—N/a		2:12.58	4
Joanna Fargus	200 m backstroke	2:10.84	1 Q	—N/a		2:10.36	1st place, gold medalist(s)
Tayliah Zimmer	200 m backstroke	2:14.38	6 Q	—N/a		2:12.95	5
Jade Edmistone	50 m breaststroke	30.51	1 Q	30.54	1 Q	30.84	2nd place, silver medalist(s)
Leisel Jones	50 m breaststroke	30.78	2 Q	30.59	2 Q	30.55	1st place, gold medalist(s)
Tarnee White	50 m breaststroke	31.55	3 Q	31.35	3 Q	31.26	3rd place, bronze medalist(s)
Jade Edmistone	100 m breaststroke	1:09.00	2 Q	1:07.93	2 Q	1:07.24	2nd place, silver medalist(s)
Leisel Jones	100 m breaststroke	1:08.52	1 Q	1:07.33	1 Q	1:05.09	1st place, gold medalist(s)
Tarnee White	100 m breaststroke	1:09.11	3 Q	1:08.34	3 Q	1:07.95	4
Sally Foster	200 m breaststroke	2:31.10	4 Q	—N/a		2:29.37	5
Brooke Hanson	200 m breaststroke	2:32.97	6 Q	—N/a		2:27.29	4
Leisel Jones	200 m breaststroke	2:29.96	3 Q	—N/a		2:20.72	1st place, gold medalist(s)
Danni Miatke	50 m butterfly	26.67	1 Q	26.58	2 Q	26.43	1st place, gold medalist(s)
Alice Mills	50 m butterfly	27.11	3 Q	26.76	3 Q	26.78	3rd place, bronze medalist(s)
Jessicah Schipper	50 m butterfly	26.77	2 Q	26.55	1 Q	26.65	2nd place, silver medalist(s)
Libby Lenton	100 m butterfly	59.43	2 Q	58.60	2 Q	57.80	2nd place, silver medalist(s)
Alice Mills	100 m butterfly	1:00.18	5 Q	1:00.17	7 Q	59.21	4
Jessicah Schipper	100 m butterfly	58.49	1 Q	58.21	1 Q	57:48	1st place, gold medalist(s)
Felicity Galvez	200 m butterfly	2:11.44	4 Q	—N/a		2:08.16	2nd place, silver medalist(s)
Kylie Palmer	200 m butterfly	2:16.14	9	—N/a		Did not advance	
Jessicah Schipper	200 m butterfly	2:09.77	1 Q	—N/a		2:06.09	1st place, gold medalist(s)
Lara Carroll	200 m individual medley	2:15.30	2 Q	—N/a		2:13.86	3rd place, bronze medalist(s)
Brooke Hanson	200 m individual medley	2:15.26	1 Q	—N/a		2:13.62	2nd place, silver medalist(s)
Stephanie Rice	200 m individual medley	2:16.44	3 Q	—N/a		2:12.90	1st place, gold medalist(s)
Lara Carroll	400 m individual medley	5:06.08	13	—N/a		Did not advance	
Jennifer Reilly	400 m individual medley	4:47.94	2 Q	—N/a		4:47.13	3rd place, bronze medalist(s)
Stephanie Rice	400 m individual medley	4:47.89	1 Q	—N/a		4:41.91	1st place, gold medalist(s)
Libby Lenton; Jodie Henry; Alice Mills; Shayne Reese	4 × 100 m freestyle relay	—N/a				3:36.49	1st place, gold medalist(s)
Libby Lenton; Bronte Barratt; Kelly Stubbins; Linda Mackenzie	4 × 200 m freestyle relay	—N/a				7:56.68	1st place, gold medalist(s)
Sophie Edington; Leisel Jones; Jessicah Schipper; Libby Lenton	4 × 100 m medley relay	—N/a				3:56.30	1st place, gold medalist(s)

== Synchronised swimming ==
Athlete	Event	Technical routine		Free routine (final)		
Athlete	Event	Points	Rank	Points	Total (technical + free)	Rank
Irena Olevsky	Solo	41.750	3	41.917	83.667	3rd place, bronze medalist(s)
Dannielle Liesch; Irena Olevsky	Duet	40.667	2	42.000	82.667	2nd place, silver medalist(s)

- Luda Plotnikova (Vic) – Reserve

== Table tennis ==
Men

Athlete	Event	Preliminary round						Round of 64	Round of 32	Round of 16	Quarterfinals	Semifinals	Final / BM	
Athlete	Event	Opposition Result	Opposition Result	Opposition Result	Opposition Result	Opposition Result	Rank	Opposition Result	Opposition Result	Opposition Result	Opposition Result	Opposition Result	Opposition Result	Rank
Trevor Brown	Singles	(Fiji) Wang; W 4–0	(Saint Vincent and the Grenadines) Pierre; W W/O	—N/a			1 Q	(New Zealand) Chen; W 4–3	(Wales) Robertson; L 1–4	Did not advance				
Brett Clarke	Singles	(Malawi) Chaika; W 4–0	(Uganda) Migade; W 4–0	—N/a			1 Q	(South Africa) Cogill; W 4–1	(New Zealand) Jackson; L 0–4	Did not advance				
William Henzell	Singles	Bye							(Barbados) Farley; W 4–0	(Malta) Gerada; W 4–2	(Singapore) Yang; W 4–0	(Wales) Robertson; W 4–0	(India) Kamal; L 3–4	2nd place, silver medalist(s)
Russ Lavale	Singles	(Kenya) Kamau; W 4–0	(Guyana) Munroe; W 4–0	—N/a			1 Q	Bye	(Guyana) Lewis; W 4–0	(Canada) Csaba; L 1–4	Did not advance			
David Zalcberg	Singles	(Maldives) Shahid; W 4–0	(Singapore) Lee; W 4–0	—N/a			1 Q	(Canada) Peter-Paul; L 2–4	Did not advance					
Trevor Brown; Russ Lavale	Doubles	—N/a						Bye	(Northern Ireland) Dennison / Graham; W 3–1	(India) Kamal / Roy; L 2–3	Did not advance			
William Henzell; David Zalcberg	Doubles	—N/a						Bye	(Jamaica) Strachan / Webb; W 3–0	(Canada) Hinse / Qiang; W 3–1	(Nigeria) Metohun / Toriola; L 1–3	Did not advance		
Trevor Brown; Brett Clarke; William Henzell; Russ Lavale; David Zalcberg	Team	Ghana; W 3–0	Kiribati; W 3–0	Saint Vincent and the Grenadines; W 3–0	India; L 0–3	Northern Ireland; W 3–0	2 Q	—N/a			Singapore; L 2–3	Malaysia; W 3–0	England; L 0–3	6

Women

Athlete	Event	Preliminary round					Round of 32	Round of 16	Quarterfinals	Semifinals	Final / BM	
Athlete	Event	Opposition Result	Opposition Result	Opposition Result	Opposition Result	Rank	Opposition Result	Opposition Result	Opposition Result	Opposition Result	Opposition Result	Rank
Peri Campbell-Innes	Singles	(Uganda) Kibone; W 4–0	(Fiji) Koi; W 4–0	(Wales) Owen; W 4–3	—N/a	1 Q	(England) Parker; L 3–4	Did not advance				
May Cho	Singles	(Fiji) Jeet; W 4–0	(Wales) Davies; W 4–1	—N/a		1 Q	(Fiji) Qu; W 4–0	(New Zealand) Li; L 3–4	Did not advance			
Jian Fang Lay	Singles	Bye						(Canada) Zhang; L 3–4	Did not advance			
Miao Miao	Singles	Bye					(Nigeria) Edem; W 4–1	(India) Ghatak; W 4–1	(Singapore) Sharon Tan; W 4–2	(Singapore) Zhang; L 1–4	(Singapore) Xu; L 0–4	4
Stephanie Sang	Singles	(South Africa) Maal; W 4–0	(Kiribati) Tetau; W 4–0	—N/a		1 Q	(England) Walker; W 4–2	(Malaysia) Beh; W 4–1	(Singapore) Xu; L 0–4	Did not advance		
Joy Boyd	Singles EAD	(Kenya) Chesang; W 3–0	(England) Gilroy; L 0–3	(Nigeria) Obiora; L 1–3	(Malaysia) Chang; W 3–0	3	—N/a		Did not advance			
Catherine Morrow	Singles EAD	(Nigeria) Konwea; L 0–3	(England) Mitton; L 0–3	(Kenya) Wanjuu; W 3–0	(South Africa) Moll; L 0–3	4	—N/a		Did not advance			
Jane Wallis	Singles EAD	(South Africa) Riese; L 0–3	(Malaysia) Pua; L 0–3	(Kenya) Kamande; W 3–2	(Wales) Harris; L 0–3	4	—N/a		Did not advance			
May Cho; Stephanie Sang	Doubles	—N/a					(Wales) Daunton / Owen; L 2–3	Did not advance				
Jian Fang Lay; Miao Miao	Doubles	—N/a					Bye	(Sri Lanka) Manikku Babo / Deepika; W 3–0	(Malaysia) Beh / Ng; W 3–1	(Singapore) Tan / Xu; L 2–3	(New Zealand) Li / Yang; W 3–2	3rd place, bronze medalist(s)
Peri Campbell-Innes; May Cho; Jian Fang Lay; Miao Miao; Stephanie Sang	Team	Vanuatu; W 3–0	Nigeria; W 3–1	England; W 3–0	Sri Lanka; W 3–0	1 Q	—N/a		New Zealand; W 3–2	Canada; W 3–2	Singapore; L 0–3	2nd place, silver medalist(s)

Mixed

Athlete	Event	Round of 64	Round of 32	Round of 16	Quarterfinals	Semifinals	Final / BM	
Athlete	Event	Opposition Result	Opposition Result	Opposition Result	Opposition Result	Opposition Result	Opposition Result	Rank
Peri Campbell-Innes; William Henzell	Doubles	(England) Walker / Baggaley; L 0–3	Did not advance					
Jian Fang Lay; Brett Clarke	Doubles	Bye	(Sri Lanka) Manikku Babo / Piyadasa; W 3–0	(Malaysia) Beh / Ibrahim; L 0–3	Did not advance			
Miao Miao; Russ Lavale	Doubles	(Mauritius) Goodur / Hau; W 3–0	(New Zealand) Shu / Jackson; W 3–0	N. Saha / S. Saha; W 3–2	(Nigeria) Oshonaike / Toriola; W 3–2	(Singapore) Li / Cai; L 1–3	(Singapore) Tan / Ho; L 2–3	4
Stephanie Sang; David Zalcberg	Doubles	(Malaysia) Ng / Chan / L 0–3	Did not advance					

== Triathlon ==
Athlete	Event	Swim (1.5 km)	Rank	Bike (40 km)	Rank	Run (10 km)	Rank	Total	Rank
Brad Kahlefeldt	Men's	17:48.46	7	1:01:01.36	6	30:26.51	1	1:49:16.33	1st place, gold medalist(s)
Peter Robertson	Men's	17:51.08	12	1:01:02.82	9	30:38.46	3	1:49:32:36	3rd place, bronze medalist(s)
Simon Thompson	Men's	17:46.37	4	1:01:04.41	11	32:25.16	11	1:51:15.94	11
Felicity Abram	Women's	19:36.24	19	1:07:23.99	14	36:23.91	10	2:03:24.14	14
Annabel Luxford	Women's	18:23.84	4	1:05:46.91	10	35:08.82	5	1:59:19.57	5
Emma Snowsill	Women's	18:25.71	7	1:05:46.13	8	33:50.76	1	1:58:02.60	1st place, gold medalist(s)

== Weightlifting ==
Men

Athlete	Event	Snatch		Clean & Jerk		Total	Rank
Athlete	Event	Result	Rank	Result	Rank	Total	Rank
Yurik Sarkisian	62 kg	113	6	142	6	255	8
Ben Turner	69 kg	128	3	166	1	294	1st place, gold medalist(s)
Joel Wilson	69 kg	127	4	156	5	283	5
Simon Heffernan	94 kg	150	3	182	2	332	2nd place, silver medalist(s)
Aleksan Karapetyan	94 kg	165	1	185	1	350	1st place, gold medalist(s)
Valeriane Sarava	105 kg	150	2	183	2	333	2nd place, silver medalist(s)
Damon Kelly	+105 kg	168	2	217	1	385	2nd place, silver medalist(s)
Chris Rae	+105 kg	172	1	216	2	388	1st place, gold medalist(s)

Athlete	Event	Total	Rank
Darren Gardiner	Open EAD powerlifting	178.9	3rd place, bronze medalist(s)
Steven Green	Open EAD powerlifting	152.1	12
Paul Hyde	Open EAD powerlifting	149.2	15

Women

Athlete	Event	Snatch		Clean & Jerk		Total	Rank
Athlete	Event	Result	Rank	Result	Rank	Total	Rank
Erika Yamasaki	48 kg	69	3	84	3	153	3rd place, bronze medalist(s)
Nadeene Latif	53 kg	66	4	86	3	152	3rd place, bronze medalist(s)
Natasha Barker	58 kg	80	1	98	4	178	3rd place, bronze medalist(s)
Jacqueline White	58 kg	77	4	-	-	77	DNF
Amanda Phillips	69 kg	84	4	109	4	193	4
Deborah Lovely	75 kg	93	1	115	1	208	1st place, gold medalist(s)

== Officials ==
- President: Mr. Sam Coffa AM JP
- Vice President: Mr. Donald Stockins OAM
- Vice President: Mrs. Susan Taylor AM
- Chief Executive Officer / Games General Manager : Mr. Perry Crosswhite AM
- Chef de Mission – Mr John Devitt
