= Synchronised swimming at the 2006 Commonwealth Games =

- Venue: Melbourne Sports and Aquatic Centre
- Location: Melbourne, Australia
- Dates: 15 to 26 March 2006

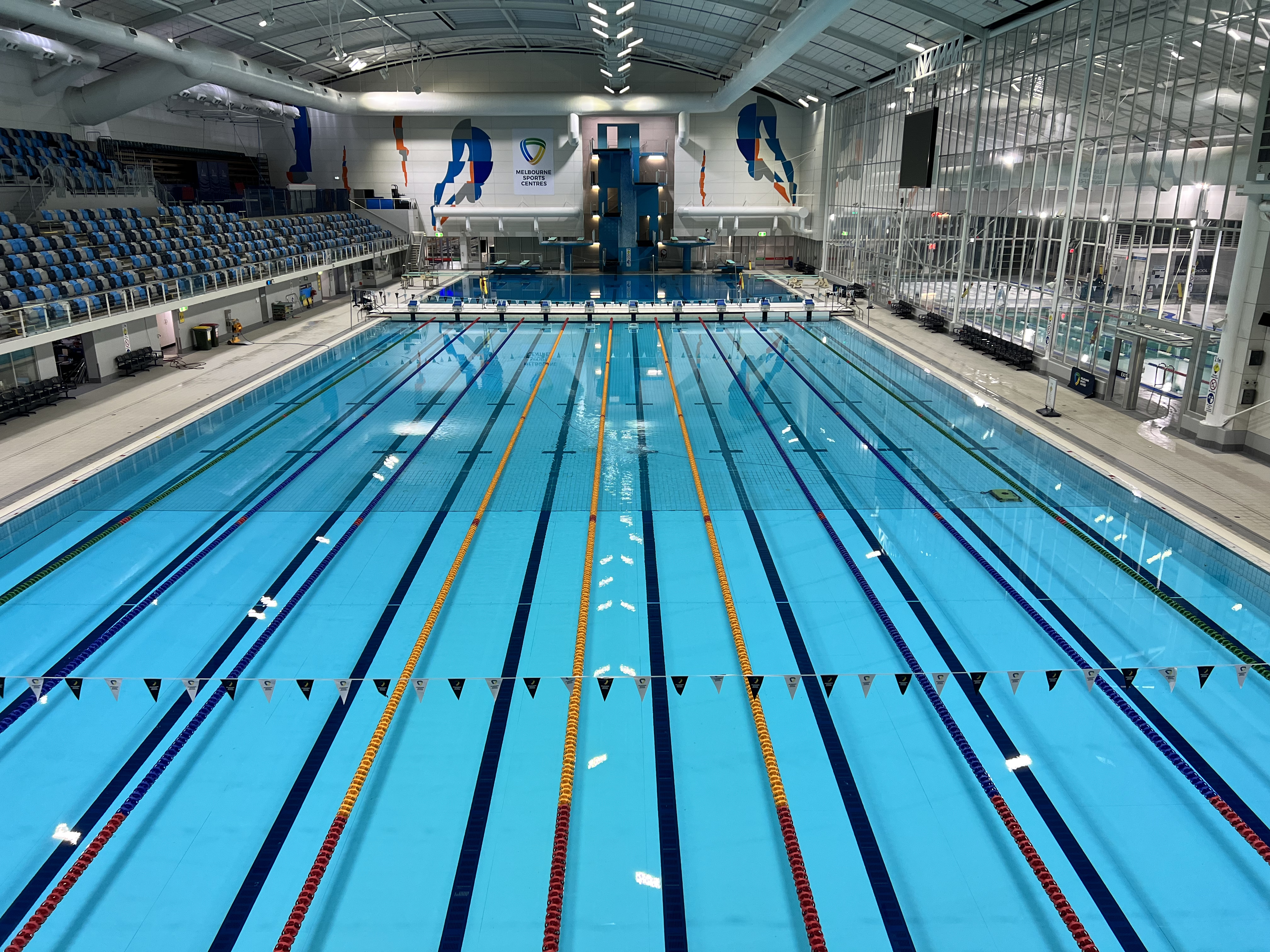
The pool at the Melbourne Sports and Aquatic Centre

Synchronised swimming at the 2006 Commonwealth Games was the sixth appearance of Synchronised swimming at the Commonwealth Games. Competition was held in Melbourne, Australia, from 15 to 26 March 2006.

The synchronised swimming events were held at the Melbourne Sports and Aquatic Centre and featured two medal events.

Canada topped the medal table by virtue of winning two gold medals.

== Medal table ==
Rank	Nation	Gold	Silver	Bronze	Total
1	Canada	2	0	0	2
2	Australia*	0	1	1	2
3	England	0	1	0	1
4	New Zealand	0	0	1	1
Totals (4 entries)		2	2	2	6

== Medallists ==
=== Women's events only ===
Event	Gold		Silver		Bronze	
Free routine solo	Marie-Pier Boudreau Gagnon; Canada	93.833	Jenna Randall; England	85.334	Irena Olevsky; Australia	83.833
Free routine duet	Canada; Marie-Pier Boudreau Gagnon; Isabelle Rampling	92.500	Australia; Dannielle Liesch; Irena Olevsky	84.000	New Zealand; Lisa Daniels; Nina Daniels	83.667
