= Naomi Russell (disambiguation) =

Naomi Russell (born 1990), is an Australian gymnast.

Naomi Russell may also refer to:

- Naomi Ryan (born 1977), a British actress born as Naomi Russell
- Naomi Russell, character in Lie to Me played by Tricia Helfer
- Naomi Russell (born 1983), an American pornographic actress, winner of an AVN Award in 2007
