= Athletics at the 2006 Commonwealth Games – Women's 20 kilometres walk =

Women's 20 kilometres walk at the Commonwealth Games

The women's 20 kilometres walk event at the 2006 Commonwealth Games was held on March 20.

== Results ==
Rank	Name	Nationality	Time	Notes
1st place, gold medalist(s)	Jane Saville	Australia	1:32:46	GR
2nd place, silver medalist(s)	Natalie Saville	Australia	1:33:33	SB
3rd place, bronze medalist(s)	Cheryl Webb	Australia	1:36:03	
4	Nicolene Cronje	South Africa	1:38:19	SB
5	Suzanne Erasmus	South Africa	1:40:54	PB
6	Deepmala Devi	India	1:41:54	SB
7	Johanna Jackson	England	1:42:04	PB
8	Niobe Menendez	England	1:47:35	
	Geetha Gallage	Sri Lanka	DNF	
