= Cycling at the 2006 Commonwealth Games – Women's individual pursuit =

The women's individual pursuit at the 2006 Commonwealth Games took place on March 19, 2006 at the Vodafone Arena.

== Qualification ==
Rank	Rider	Time	Average Speed (km/h)
1	Katie Mactier (AUS)	3:30.290; GR	51.357
2	Katherine Bates (AUS)	3:34.471	50.356
3	Emma Jones (ENG)	3:38.791	49.362
4	Alison Shanks (NZL)	3:40.733	48.927
5	Katrina Hair (SCO)	3:43.524	48.316
6	Paddy Walker (NZL)	3:44.191	48.173
7	Alexis Rhodes (AUS)	3:44.614	48.082
8	Iona Wynter (JAM)	3:52.679	46.415
9	Uracca Leow Hoay Sim (MAS)	3:59.430	45.107
10	Noor Azian Binti Alias (MAS)	4:05.107	44.062
	Wendy Houvenaghel (ENG)	DSQ	

== Finals ==
Gold medal race

Rank	Name	Time
1st place, gold medalist(s)	Katie Mactier (AUS)	3:35.196
2nd place, silver medalist(s)	Katherine Bates (AUS)	3:37.089

Bronze medal race

Rank	Name	Time
3rd place, bronze medalist(s)	Emma Jones (ENG)	3:40.057
4	Alison Shanks (NZL)	3:40.878
