= Diving at the 2006 Commonwealth Games – Women's 10 metre platform =

Women's 10 metre platform at the 2006 Commonwealth Games
- Venue: Melbourne Sports and Aquatic Centre
- Date: 23 March
- Competitors: 10 from 4 nations
- Winning score: 737.75

Medalists
gold medal	Loudy Tourky	Australia
silver medal	Chantelle Newbery	Australia
bronze medal	Emilie Heymans	Canada

The women's 10 metre platform was part of the Diving at the 2006 Commonwealth Games program. The competition was held on 22 March 2006 at Melbourne Sports and Aquatic Centre in Melbourne, Australia.

== Format ==
The competition was held in two rounds:

- Preliminary round: All 10 divers perform six dives, and as there are only 10 competitors, they all advance to the final.
- Final: The 10 divers perform six dives; these are added onto the preliminary round scores and the top three divers win the gold, silver and bronze medals accordingly.

== Schedule ==
All times are Australian Eastern Daylight Time (UTC+11).

Date	Start	Round
23 March	11:31	Preliminary
23 March	20:44	Finals

== Results ==
Results:

Rank	Diver	Preliminary		Final		Total Points
Rank	Diver	Points	Rank	Points	Rank	Total Points
1st place, gold medalist(s)	Loudy Tourky (AUS)	375.05	1	362.70	1	737.75
2nd place, silver medalist(s)	Chantelle Newbery (AUS)	366.85	2	366.70	2	733.55
3rd place, bronze medalist(s)	Emilie Heymans (CAN)	342.90	4	390.60	3	733.50
4	Roseline Filion (CAN)	344.95	3	358.90	4	703.85
5	Melissa Wu (AUS)	303.20	6	367.20	5	670.40
6	Rachel Kemp (CAN)	324.95	5	330.75	6	655.70
7	Tonia Couch (ENG)	297.95	7	313.70	7	611.65
8	Stacie Powell (ENG)	271.30	9	339.95	8	611.25
9	Monique McCarroll (SCO)	273.60	8	299.50	9	573.10
10	Sarah Barrow (ENG)	227.05	10	257.05	10	484.10
