= George Barton (sport shooter) =

Australian sport shooter

Personal information
- Full name: George Raymond Barton
- Nationality: Australia
- Born: 6 September 1977 (age 49) Tamworth, New South Wales, Australia
- Height: 1.81 m (5 ft 11 1/2 in)
- Weight: 80 kg (176 lb)

Sport
- Sport: Shooting
- Event: Skeet
- Club: Tamworth Gun Club
- Coached by: Greg Chan
Medal record
Men's shooting
Representing Australia
Commonwealth Games
Silver medal – second place	2002 Manchester	Skeet pairs
Bronze medal – third place	2006 Melbourne	Skeet pairs

George Raymond Barton (born 6 September 1977 in Tamworth, New South Wales) is an Australian sport shooter. He won a bronze medal in men's skeet pair shooting, along with his brother Clive Barton, at the 2006 Commonwealth Games in Melbourne, with a total score of 183 points.

Barton made his official debut for the 2004 Summer Olympics in Athens, where he placed twenty-ninth in men's skeet shooting, with a total score of 118 points, tying his position with Egypt's Mostafa Hamdy.

At the 2008 Summer Olympics in Beijing, Barton competed for the second time, as a 30-year-old, in men's skeet shooting, along with his teammate Paul Rahman. He finished only in seventeenth place by one point behind Czech Republic's Jan Sychra, for a total score of 116 targets.
