= Susan Trindall =

Australian sport shooter (born 1983)

Personal information
- Full name: Susan Maree Trindall
- Nationality: Australia
- Born: 5 May 1983 (age 43) Brisbane, Queensland, Australia
- Height: 176 cm (5 ft 9 in)
- Weight: 65 kg (143 lb)

Sport
- Sport: Shooting
- Events: Trap (TR75); Double trap (DT120)
- Club: Showman's Clay Target Club
- Coached by: Dorothy Trindall (club); Greg Chan (national)
Medal record
Representing Australia
Women's shooting
Commonwealth Games
Bronze medal – third place	2002 Manchester	Double Trap Pairs

Susan Maree Trindall (born 5 May 1983) is an Australian sport shooter. She has won a career tally of five medals, including a gold in women's double trap shooting under junior division at the 2001 ISSF World Championships in Cairo, Egypt, and had a golden opportunity to represent Australia at the 2004 Summer Olympics in Athens. Trindall is also a member of Showman's Clay Target Shooting Range and the Australian Clay Target Shooting Association, where she trains full-time under head coach Greg Chan.

Born in Brisbane, Trindall made her first and only Australian squad, along with teammate Suzanne Balogh in the women's double trap at the 2004 Summer Olympics in Athens. She achieved a minimum qualifying score of 102 to fill out one of the Olympic places awarded to the Aussie team at the 2003 ISSF World Cup meet in Granada, Spain. Trindall shot 107 hits out of 120 to force a seventh-place tie with Chinese Taipei's Lin Yi-chun in the qualifying round, narrowly missing out the final by just a single target.
