= Weightlifting at the 2006 Commonwealth Games – Men's 94 kg =

Weightlifting – Men's 94 kg at the 2006 Commonwealth Games
- Venue: Melbourne Exhibition Centre
- Dates: 21 March 2006
- Competitors: 10 from 7 nations
- Winning total weight: 350

Medalists
gold medal	Aleksander Karapetyan	Australia
silver medal	Simon Heffernan	Australia
bronze medal	Thomas Yule	Scotland

The Men's 94 kg weightlifting event at the 2006 Commonwealth Games took place at the Melbourne Exhibition Centre on 21 March 2006.The weightlifter from Australia won the gold, lifting a total weight of 350 kg.

== Schedule ==
All times are Australian Eastern Standard Time (UTC+10)

Date	Time	Event
21 March 2006	14:00	Group A

== Records ==
Prior to this competition, the existing world, Commonwealth and Games records were as follows:

World record	Snatch	Akakios Kakiasvilis (GRE)	188 kg	Athens, Greece	27 November 1999
World record	Clean & Jerk	Szymon Kołecki (POL)	232 kg	Sofia, Bulgaria	29 April 2000
World record	Total	World Standard	417 kg	–	1 January 1998
Commonwealth record	Snatch	Aleksander Karapetyan (AUS)	182 kg	Antalya, Turkey	9 November 2001
Commonwealth record	Clean & Jerk	Aleksander Karapetyan (AUS)	210 kg	Antalya, Turkey	9 November 2001
Commonwealth record	Total	Aleksander Karapetyan (AUS)	392 kg	Antalya, Turkey	9 November 2001
Games record	Snatch	Aleksander Karapetyan (AUS)	167 kg	Manchester, Great Britain	2 August 2002
Games record	Clean & Jerk	Kiril Kounev (AUS)	205 kg	Kuala Lumpur, Malaysia	18 September 1998
Games record	Total	Kiril Kounev (AUS)	370 kg	Kuala Lumpur, Malaysia	18 September 1998

== Results ==
Rank	Athlete	Nation	Group	Body weight	Snatch (kg)				Clean & Jerk (kg)				Total
Rank	Athlete	Nation	Group	Body weight	1	2	3	Result	1	2	3	Result	Total
1st place, gold medalist(s)	Aleksander Karapetyan	Australia	A	93.95	155	160	165	165	185	~~190~~	~~190~~	185	350
2nd place, silver medalist(s)	Simon Heffernan	Australia	A	83.54	143	147	150	150	178	182	~~190~~	182	332
3rd place, bronze medalist(s)	Thomas Yule	Scotland	A	93.98	146	151	~~153~~	151	175	~~181~~	~~181~~	175	326
4	Grant Cavit	New Zealand	A	92.73	145	~~150~~	~~150~~	145	175	~~181~~	~~181~~	175	320
5	Dalas Santavy	Canada	A	92.87	~~138~~	138	~~142~~	138	181	~~188~~	~~188~~	181	319
6	Nicolas Roberts	Canada	A	89.18	138	143	~~146~~	143	~~175~~	~~175~~	175	175	318
7	Can Osman	Cyprus	A	89.15	~~130~~	~~130~~	130	130	155	163	~~170~~	163	293
8	Michael Abotsi	Ghana	A	90.33	~~120~~	120	~~130~~	120	~~162~~	162	167	167	287
–	Achilleas Michail	Cyprus	A	91.95	~~143~~	~~145~~	~~145~~	–	–	–	–	–	–
–	Steven Baccus	Seychelles	A	92.48	~~140~~	~~140~~	~~140~~	–	–	–	–	–	–
