= Diving at the 2006 Commonwealth Games – Men's 3 metre springboard =

Men's 3 metre springboard at the 2006 Commonwealth Games
- Venue: Melbourne Sports and Aquatic Centre
- Date: 23 March
- Competitors: 12 from 5 nations
- Winning score: 941.60

Medalists
gold medal	Alexandre Despatie	Canada
silver medal	Robert Newbery	Australia
bronze medal	Steven Barnett	Australia

The men's 3 metre springboard was part of the Diving at the 2006 Commonwealth Games program. The competition was held on 23 March 2006 at Melbourne Sports and Aquatic Centre in Melbourne, Australia.

== Format ==
The competition was held in two rounds:

- Preliminary round: All 12 divers perform six dives, and as there are only 12 competitors, they all advance to the final.
- Final: The 12 divers perform six dives; these are added onto the preliminary round scores and the top three divers win the gold, silver and bronze medals accordingly.

== Schedule ==
All times are Australian Eastern Daylight Time (UTC+11).

Date	Start	Round
23 March	10:00	Preliminary
23 March	19:00	Finals

== Results ==
Results:

Rank	Diver	Preliminary		Final		Total Points
Rank	Diver	Points	Rank	Points	Rank	Total Points
1st place, gold medalist(s)	Alexandre Despatie (CAN)	442.00	3	499.60	1	941.60
2nd place, silver medalist(s)	Robert Newbery (AUS)	446.00	2	460.30	2	906.30
3rd place, bronze medalist(s)	Steven Barnett (AUS)	428.25	4	441.15	3	869.40
4	Matthew Mitcham (AUS)	412.65	6	413.50	4	826.15
5	Arturo Miranda (CAN)	414.45	5	392.55	5	807.00
6	Tony Ally (ENG)	379.85	7	355.15	6	735.00
7	Ben Swain (ENG)	335.50	8	370.30	7	705.80
8	Safwan Khairul (MAS)	291.30	10	365.40	8	656.70
9	Kevin Geyson (CAN)	310.85	9	342.00	9	652.85
10	Gary Hunt (ENG)	280.05	11	334.15	10	614.20
11	Yeoh Ken Nee (MAS)	455.65	1	115.50	11	571.15
12	Esiri Kankanige (SRI)	168.80	12	DNS		
