= Tony Sargisson =

New Zealand racewalker

Personal information
- Full name: Tony Robert Sargisson
- Born: 24 June 1975 (age 51) Hastings, New Zealand
- Height: 178 cm (5 ft 10 in)
Medal record
Men's Athletics
Representing New Zealand
Commonwealth Games
Silver medal – second place	2006 Melbourne	50km walk

Tony Robert Sargisson (born 24 June 1975 in Hastings, New Zealand) won the silver medal for New Zealand in the men's 50km walk at the 2006 Melbourne Commonwealth Games. He now lives in Auckland and walks for Racewalking Auckland.

He also teaches Liam McRobb at Albany Junior High School
