= Athletics at the 2006 Commonwealth Games – Men's 5000 metres =

Running race

Men's 5000 metres at the Commonwealth Games

The men's 5000 metres event at the 2006 Commonwealth Games was held on March 20.

== Results ==
Rank	Name	Nationality	Time	Notes
1st place, gold medalist(s)	Augustine Choge	Kenya	12:56.41	GR
2nd place, silver medalist(s)	Craig Mottram	Australia	12:58.19	
3rd place, bronze medalist(s)	Benjamin Limo	Kenya	13:05.30	
4	Joseph Ebuya	Kenya	13:05.89	
5	Fabian Joseph Naasi	Tanzania	13:12.76	PB
6	Damian Chopa	Tanzania	13:24.03	
7	Moses Kipsiro	Uganda	13:25.06	
8	Dickson Marwa Mkami	Tanzania	13:26.43	SB
9	Mo Farah	England	13:40.53	
10	Tonny Wamulwa	Zambia	13:40.78	PB
11	Moorosi Soke	South Africa	13:45.10	PB
12	Christopher Davies	Wales	13:48.24	SB
13	Reid Coolsaet	Canada	14:05.32	
14	Tshamano Setone	South Africa	14:08.21	
15	Cleveland Forde	Guyana	14:11.82	
16	Mike Tebulo	Malawi	14:34.34	PB
17	Alexandros Kalogerogiannis	Cyprus	14:40.06	SB
18	Louis Rowan	Australia	14:40.07	
19	Sapolai Yao	Papua New Guinea	15:29.80	PB
