= Irena Olevsky =

Australian synchronized swimmer

Personal information
- Nationality: Australian
- Born: 22 March 1974 (age 52) Moscow, Soviet Union
- Height: 1.78 m (5 ft 10 in)
- Weight: 62 kg (137 lb)

Sport
- Country: Australia
- Sport: Synchronized swimming
- Club: Nunawading
- Coached by: Anna Nepotacheva
- Retired: 2006
Medal record
Representing Australia
Synchronized swimming
Commonwealth Games
Silver medal – second place	1998 Kuala Lumpur	Duet
Silver medal – second place	2006 Melbourne	Duet
Bronze medal – third place	2006 Melbourne	Solo

Irena Olevsky (born 22 March 1974) is a former Australian synchronized swimmer who competed in the 2000 Summer Olympics.

== Personal life ==
Olevsky was born on 22 March 1974 in Moscow, Russia. As of 2006, she is 1.78 m (5 ft 10 in) tall and weighs 62 kg (137 lb).

== Synchronised swimming ==
Olevsky and Naomi Young competed at the 1998 Commonwealth Games, and received a silver medal in the duet event. Olevsky also competed at the 2000 Summer Olympics, placing 8th in the team event and 16th in the duet event with Young.

Olevsky competed at the 2006 Commonwealth Games, receiving a silver medal in the Free Routine Duet with Dannielle Liesch, as well as a bronze medal in the Free Routine Solo event. Olevsky retired shortly after the Commonwealth Games, after 27 years of competition in the sport.
