= Athletics at the 2006 Commonwealth Games – Men's 50 kilometres walk =

Men's 50 kilometres walk at the Commonwealth Games

The men's 50 kilometres walk event at the 2006 Commonwealth Games was held on March 24.

== Results ==
Rank	Name	Nationality	Time	Notes
1st place, gold medalist(s)	Nathan Deakes	Australia	3:42:53	GR
2nd place, silver medalist(s)	Tony Sargisson	New Zealand	3:58:05	PB
3rd place, bronze medalist(s)	Chris Erickson	Australia	3:58:22	PB
4	Craig Barrett	New Zealand	4:02:27	
5	Tim Berrett	Canada	4:08:18	
6	Steve Partington	Isle of Man	4:25:39	
7	Mohd Sharrulhaizy Abdul Rahman	Malaysia	5:07:32	
	Duane Cousins	Australia	DQ	
	Charles Arosanyin	Nigeria	DQ	
	Dip Chand	Fiji	DNS	
