= Lawn bowls at the 2006 Commonwealth Games – Men's triples =

The men triples started the 2006 Commonwealth Games with 1 group of 6 and 3 groups of 5. In the Group Stage New Zealand was actually beaten by Northern Ireland in the 3rd round of Group 2 to finish second in their group. Group 3 also had an upset as Kenya beat Australia 2 sets to 1. The loss didn't prevent Australia from qualifying for the quarter-finals, winning Group 3 ahead of Malta. The other second place teams were Malaysia, New Zealand and South Africa while Cook Islands, Northern Ireland and England won their groups to qualify for the quarterfinals. In the 2nd quarterfinal Australia had to take on New Zealand which was a tight showdown. Northern Ireland surprised England in the semi-finals to qualify for their very first medal in bowls. In the Gold medal show down Australia beat Northern Ireland 8-6 10-4 while South Africa took the Bronze.

== Group stage ==
=== Group 1 ===
Team	Played	Won	Lost	Points	Set Diff
Cook Islands	5	4	1	8	+5
Malaysia	5	3	2	6	+3
Papua New Guinea	5	3	2	6	+1
Guernsey	5	2	3	4	-2
Samoa	5	2	3	4	-5
Brunei	5	1	4	2	-2

Men's Triples Group 1 Round 1

Team	Score	Team
Cook Islands	6-13 8-3 2-1	Malaysia
Samoa	17-5 8-8	Papua New Guinea
Guernsey	8-7 4-12 2-1	Brunei

Men's Triples Group 1 Round 2

Team	Score	Team
Cook Islands	10-5 13-4	Guernsey
Papua New Guinea	11-8 8-8	Brunei
Malaysia	6-5 8-8	Samoa

Men's Triples Group 1 Round 3

Team	Score	Team
Cook Islands	11-10 8-6	Samoa
Papua New Guinea	9-7 6-12 2-1	Guernsey
Brunei	6-5 8-8	Malaysia

Men's Triples Group 1 Round 4

Team	Score	Team
Cook Islands	9-7 12-8	Brunei
Malaysia	13-3 5-8 2-0	Papua New Guinea
Guernsey	18-3 10-4	Samoa

Men's Triples Group 1 Round 5

Team	Score	Team
Papua New Guinea	6-4 9-9	Cook Islands
Samoa	6-11 14-7 2-0	Brunei
Malaysia	14-2 15-3	Guernsey

=== Group 2 ===
Team	Played	Won	Lost	Points	Set Diff
Northern Ireland	4	4	0	8	+4
New Zealand	4	3	1	6	+2
Namibia	4	2	2	4	-1
Wales	4	1	3	2	-3
Fiji	4	0	4	0	-5

Men's Triples Group 2 Round 1

Team	Score	Team
New Zealand	3-8 9-3 2-1	Fiji
Namibia	12-5 11-10	Wales

Men's Triples Group 2 Round 2

Team	Score	Team
Northern Ireland	9-4 5-10 2-1	Wales
New Zealand	11-7 8-6	Namibia

Men's Triples Group 2 Round 3

Team	Score	Team
Namibia	4-8 11-7 2-1	Fiji
Northern Ireland	16-1 12-5	New Zealand

Men's Triples Group 2 Round 4

Team	Score	Team
Northern Ireland	3-11 10-7 2-1	Fiji
New Zealand	10-9 9-4	Wales

Men's Triples Group 2 Round 5

Team	Score	Team
Wales	12-4 15-5	Fiji
Northern Ireland	18-5 12-5	Namibia

=== Group 3 ===
Team	Played	Won	Lost	Points	Set Diff
Australia	4	3	1	6	+5
Malta	4	3	1	6	+4
Canada	4	2	2	4	-1
Kenya	4	1	3	2	-3
Niue	4	1	3	2	-5

Men's Triples Group 3 Round 1

Team	Score	Team
Canada	10-6 8-8	Niue
Malta	7-6 6-5	Kenya

Men's Triples Group 3 Round 2

Team	Score	Team
Kenya	5-7 10-9 2-0	Australia
Malta	11-6 11-2	Niue

Men's Triples Group 3 Round 3

Team	Score	Team
Malta	9-8 8-5	Canada
Australia	18-2 10-6	Niue

Men's Triples Group 3 Round 4

Team	Score	Team
Australia	8-8 10-8	Canada
Niue	4-13 15-2 2-1	Kenya

Men's Triples Group 3 Round 5

Team	Score	Team
Canada	7-7 10-5	Kenya
Australia	13-4 12-4	Malta

=== Group 4 ===
Team	Played	Won	Lost	Points	Set Diff
England	4	4	0	8	+5
South Africa	4	3	1	6	+4
Norfolk Island	4	1	3	2	-2
Scotland	4	1	3	2	-3
Jersey	4	1	3	2	-5

Men's Triples Group 4 Round 1

Team	Score	Team
South Africa	11-4 11-7	Jersey
England	11-6 11-5	Scotland

Men's Triples Group 4 Round 2

Team	Score	Team
England	11-2 9-9	Norfolk Island
Jersey	7-7 11-5	Scotland

Men's Triples Group 4 Round 3

Team	Score	Team
South Africa	15-6 6-7 2-1	Scotland
Norfolk Island	9-4 7-6	Jersey

Men's Triples Group 4 Round 4

Team	Score	Team
South Africa	15-6 10-6	Norfolk Island
England	10-5 8-6	Jersey

Men's Triples Group 4 Round 5

Team	Score	Team
England	7-9 8-4 2-0	South Africa
Scotland	7-9 9-7 2-1	Norfolk Island

== Final Rounds ==
=== 17th to 20th ===
Team	Played	Won	Lost	Points	Set Diff
Jersey	3	3	0	6	+3
Niue	3	2	1	4	+4
Fiji	3	1	2	2	-1
Samoa	3	0	3	0	-5

Men's Triples 17th-20th round 1

Team	Score	Team
Fiji	10-5 9-4	Samoa
Jersey	4-7 15-6 2-1	Niue

Men's Triples 17th-20th round 2

Team	Score	Team
Niue	10-7 13-5	Samoa
Jersey	12-7 9-11 2-1	Fiji

Men's Triples 17th-20th round 3

Team	Score	Team
Jersey	10-5 8-8	Samoa
Niue	(FOR)	Fiji

=== 13th to 16th ===
Team	Played	Won	Lost	Points	Set Diff
Scotland	3	3	0	6	+4
Wales	3	2	1	4	+1
Guernsey	3	1	2	2	0
Kenya	3	0	3	0	-5

Men's Triples 13th-16th round 1

Team	Score	Team
Wales	3-13 15-3 2-0	Guernsey
Scotland	9-4 8-3	Kenya

Men's Triples 13th-16th round 2

Team	Score	Team
Guernsey	13-2 16-3	Kenya
Scotland	12-4 6-9 2-1	Wales

Men's Triples 13th-16th round 3

Team	Score	Team
Scotland	9-9 12-8	Guernsey
Wales	9-8 6-7 2-0	Kenya

=== 9th to 12th ===
Team	Played	Won	Lost	Points	Set Diff
Canada	3	3	0	6	+5
Papua New Guinea	3	2	1	4	+1
Namibia	3	1	2	2	-2
Norfolk Island	3	0	3	0	-4

Men's Triples 9th-12th round 1

Team	Score	Team
Papua New Guinea	7-6 8-9 2-0	Namibia
Canada	13-5 14-5	Norfolk Island

Men's Triples 9th-12th round 2

Team	Score	Team
Canada	5-9 16-6 2-0	Papua New Guinea
Namibia	7-7 10-7	Norfolk Island

Men's Triples 9th-12th round 3

Team	Score	Team
Papua New Guinea	8-8 10-4	Norfolk Island
Canada	9-8 16-5	Namibia

=== Knockout stages ===
Quarter finals
1D	Cook Islands	1	4
2A	South Africa	15	17
1C	Australia	12	5	2
2B	New Zealand	5	7	0
1B	Northern Ireland	15	12
2C	Malta	6	4
1D	England	11	10
2A	Malaysia	6	3

Semi finals
2A	South Africa	3	2
1C	Australia	8	14
1B	Northern Ireland	6	5	2
1D	England	4	8	1

Final
1C	Australia	8	10
1B	Northern Ireland	6	4
Third place
2A	South Africa	5	11	2
1D	England	7	2	1
