= Natalie Saville =

Australian racewalker

Olympic medal record

Commonwealth Games
Silver medal – second place	2006 Melbourne	20 km walk

Natalie Saville (born 7 September 1978) is an Australian race walker.

She finished second in the 20 km race at the 2006 Commonwealth Games behind her sister, Jane, after finishing 4th at the 2002 Commonwealth Games and 36th in the same event at the 2004 Summer Olympics in Athens. At a national level, she has won three junior championships at 5000m, one national 10 km championship and finished in the top three on eight occasions. Saville is coached by her brother-in-law, Matt White.

Both Jane and Natalie Saville live in the City of Randwick Local Government Area. Natalie Saville was presented with the Keys to the City of Randwick on 22 October 2002 by Mayor Dominic Sullivan in recognition of outstanding achievement in sport. Her sister Jane was also presented with the Key to the City of Randwick at the same time.
