= Cheryl Webb =

Australian racewalker

Olympic medal record

Commonwealth Games
Bronze medal – third place	2006 Melbourne	20km walk

Cheryl Webb (born 3 October 1976 in Penrith, New South Wales), is an Australian race walker. Webb won the bronze medal in the 20 km race at the 2006 Commonwealth Games in Melbourne. She is self coached since 2004.

Webb made her international debut in 2004. She finished 38th in the 20 km race at the 2004 Summer Olympics and 21st in the same event at the 2005 World Championships in Athletics.

== Achievements ==
Year	Competition	Venue	Position	Notes
Representing Australia
2005	World Championships	Helsinki, Finland	21st	20 km
2009	World Championships	Berlin, Germany	disqualified	20 km

== Statistics ==
- 2010: Commonwealth Games - Delhi, India (5th)
- 2010: World Walking Cup - Chihuahua, Mexico (disqualified)
- 2009: World Championships - Berlin, Germany (disqualified)
- 2009: National Champion - Melbourne, Australia (fastest Australian female on Australian soil of all time over 20 km, 1.29.44)
- 2006: Commonwealth Games - Melbourne, Australia (3rd, 1.36.03)
- 2006: World Walking Cup - La Coruna, Spain (37th, 1.36.33)
- 2005: World Championships - Helsinki, Finland (21st, 1.33.58)
- 2004: Olympic Games - Athens, Greece (38th, 1.37.40)
- 2004: World Walking Cup - Naumburg, Germany (26th, 1.31.42)
