= Naomi Russell =

Australian artistic gymnast

- Full name: Naomi Rebecca Russell
- Born: 8 June 1990 (age 36) Brisbane, Queensland

Gymnastics career
- Discipline: Women's artistic gymnastics
- Country represented: Australia
Medal record
Representing Australia
Commonwealth Games
| Gold medal – first place | 2006 Melbourne | Team |
| Bronze medal – third place | 2006 Melbourne | Vault |

Naomi Rebecca Russell (born 8 June 1990 in Brisbane, Queensland) is an Australian gymnast.

Russell represented Australia in the 2006 Commonwealth Games. She won gold with the team and a bronze on vault.

Russell won the silver medal in the all-around competition at the 2006 Artistic Gymnastics Championships (Australian nationals) at the Sydney Olympic Park Sports Centre.
