= Clive Barton =

Australian sport shooter

Personal information
- Nationality: Australia
- Born: 2 October 1971 (age 54)

Sport
- Sport: Shooting
Medal record
Men's shooting
Representing Australia
Commonwealth Games
Silver medal – second place	2006 Melbourne	Men's skeet
Bronze medal – third place	2006 Melbourne	Men's skeet - Pairs

Clive Barton (born 2 October 1971) is an Australian sport shooter. Barton competed at the 2000 Summer Olympics in the Men's skeet event, in which he tied for 14th place. At the 2012 Summer Olympics he competed in the Men's skeet event as well, finishing in 29th and 35th places on each day of the competition.
