= Suzanne Balogh =

Australian sport shooter

Medal record

Representing Australia

Women's shooting

Olympic Games
Gold medal – first place	2004 Athens	Trap

Commonwealth Games
Gold medal – first place	2006 Melbourne	Trap Pairs
Bronze medal – third place	2002 Manchester	Double Trap Pairs
Bronze medal – third place	2006 Melbourne	Double Trap Pairs

Suzanne Elspeth (Suzy) Balogh OAM (born 8 May 1973 in Queanbeyan, New South Wales) is a sport shooter from Australia. Balogh competed at the 2004 Summer Olympics and won a gold medal in Trap. She also competed in the Double Trap event. She also competed in the 2002 Commonwealth Games in Manchester where she won a bronze medal, and the 2006 Games in Melbourne, where she won a gold and a bronze in the Trap events. She also reached the final of the women's trap at the 2012 Summer Olympics.
