= Dannielle Liesch =

Australian synchronized swimmer

Personal information
- Born: 18 May 1978 (age 48) Toowoomba, Australia

Sport
- Sport: Swimming
Medal record
Representing Australia
Commonwealth Games
Silver medal – second place	2006 Melbourne	Duet

Dannielle Liesch (born 18 May 1978) is an Australian synchronized swimmer who competed in the 2000 Summer Olympics.
