= Harry Owen =

Harry Owen may refer to:

- Harry Owen (rugby league, Widnes) (1907–1966), rugby league footballer who played in the 1920s, 1930s, and 1940s
- Harry Owen (rugby league, born 1905) (1905–1986), Australian rugby league player
- Harry Collinson Owen (1882–1956), British journalist and author
- Harry Owen (gymnast) born 1993), Welsh gymnast who competed in Gymnastics at the 2014 Commonwealth Games – Men's artistic team all-around

== See also ==
- Henry Owen (disambiguation)
- Harry Owens (1902–1986), American musician
- Harold Owen (1897–1971), brother of Wilfred Owen
