= Gymnastics at the 2014 Commonwealth Games – Men's artistic team all-around =

Men's artistic team all-around at the 2014 Commonwealth Games
- Venue: Scottish Exhibition and Conference Centre
- Dates: 28–29 July 2014
- Competitors: 62 from 17 nations

Medalists
gold medal	Sam Oldham; Louis Smith; Kristian Thomas; Max Whitlock; Nile Wilson	England
silver medal	Frank Baines; Adam Cox; Liam Davie; Daniel Keatings; Daniel Purvis	Scotland
bronze medal	Zachary Clay; Nathan Gafuik; Anderson Loran; Kevin Lytwyn; Scott Morgan	Canada

The Men's artistic team all-around gymnastics competition at the 2014 Commonwealth Games in Glasgow, Scotland was held on 28 and 29 July at the Scottish Exhibition and Conference Centre.

== Team competition ==
Rank	Country	Floor (gymnastics)	Pommel horse	Rings (gymnastics)	Vault (gymnastics)	Parallel bars	Horizontal bar	Total
1st place, gold medalist(s)	England	45.391	45.066	43.439	44.933	43.466	44.599	266.804
1st place, gold medalist(s)	Max Whitlock	15.600	15.733	14.433	15.333	14.500	14.766	266.804
1st place, gold medalist(s)	Nile Wilson	14.458	13.633	14.383	14.500	14.833	14.800	266.804
1st place, gold medalist(s)	Kristian Thomas	14.466		14.000	15.100		15.300	266.804
1st place, gold medalist(s)	Sam Oldham	15.325	12.100	14.533	14.500			266.804
1st place, gold medalist(s)	Louis Smith		15.700			14.133		266.804
2nd place, silver medalist(s)	Scotland	42.932	41.773	42.575	43.532	43.799	43.032	257.603
2nd place, silver medalist(s)	Daniel Keatings	14.966	14.533	13.900	14.133	14.100	14.566	257.603
2nd place, silver medalist(s)	Frank Baines	14.066	13.600	13.975	14.566	14.966	14.633	257.603
2nd place, silver medalist(s)	Daniel Purvis	13.900	13.600	14.700	14.833	14.733	13.833	257.603
2nd place, silver medalist(s)	Adam Cox	13.500	12.666		14.066	13.133		257.603
2nd place, silver medalist(s)	Liam Davie			12.400			12.133	257.603
3rd place, bronze medalist(s)	Canada	42.999	38.665	43.716	42.999	42.166	41.533	252.078
3rd place, bronze medalist(s)	Anderson Loran	14.333	13.666	13.650	14.233		13.800	252.078
3rd place, bronze medalist(s)	Nathan Gafuik	12.833	12.033		14.100	13.533	13.333	252.078
3rd place, bronze medalist(s)	Zachary Clay		12.966	11.233	13.100	14.233	13.833	252.078
3rd place, bronze medalist(s)	Kevin Lytwyn	13.733		14.866		14.400	13.900	252.078
3rd place, bronze medalist(s)	Scott Morgan	14.933		15.200	14.666			252.078
4	Australia	41.665	37.965	41.874	41.195	42.090	41.432	246.941
4	Naoya Tsukahara	13.866	13.266	14.308	12.866	14.691	13.900	246.941
4	Luke Wadsworth	13.366	12.633	13.933	14.316	14.366	13.433	246.941
4	Sean O'Hara	13.866	12.066	13.366	13.663	12.600	13.766	246.941
4	Kent Pieterse	13.933			13.966		13.766	246.941
4	Jack Rickards		11.300	13.633		13.033		246.941
5	Wales	42.299	40.208	39.832	39.815	39.566	39.665	241.385
5	Clinton Purnell	14.533	13.400	14.333	12.933	12.733	13.366	241.385
5	Iwan Mepham	14.200	12.308	13.266	13.183	13.800	13.336	241.385
5	Harry Owen	13.566	11.933	12.233	13.266	13.033	10.966	241.385
5	Robert Sansby	13.033		11.966	13.366	12.333	12.933	241.385
5	Jac Davies		14.500					241.385
6	New Zealand	39.724	38.182	41.133	41.015	40.532	38.065	241.385
6	David Bishop	14.366	12.533	12.933	13.816	13.033	12.066	241.385
6	Kristofer Done	12.100	12.556	13.300	13.633	13.933	13.336	241.385
6	Mikhail Koudinov	13.258	13.083	13.333	13.366	13.566	10.333	241.385
6	Matthew Palmer	11.933		14.500	13.566			241.385
6	Reid McGowan		11.033			12.900	13.133	241.385
7	India	41.666	36.699	41.232	40.274	39.582	36.399	235.852
7	Ashish Kumar	14.400	11.866	11.800	13.900	13.616	12.733	235.852
7	Rakesh Patra	13.500	12.000	14.266	13.566	13.233	11.666	235.852
7	Aditya Rana	13.766	11.800	13.533	12.808	12.566	11.900	235.852
7	Partha Mondal			13.433		12.733	11.766	235.852
7	Siddharth Verma	11.400	12.833		12.066			235.852
8	Cyprus	38.666	34.932	39.733	40.148	39.557	40.833	233.869
8	Panagiotis Aristotelous	13.200	11.566	13.300	13.566	11.833	13.533	233.869
8	Xenios Papaevripidou	12.533	12.366	12.266	13.233	12.733	13.600	233.869
8	Stefanos Loucaides	12.933	11.000	12.700	13.316	13.258	12.900	233.869
8	Dimitris Krasias				13.266	13.566	13.700	233.869
8	Herodotos Giorgallas			13.733				233.869
9	South Africa	40.266	35.798	38.933	41.226	38.532	34.899	229.694
9	Siphesihle Biyase	13.200	12.466	11.633	13.800	13.000	12.533	229.694
9	Tiaan Grobler	12.833	12.466	12.833	13.233	12.666	12.566	229.694
9	Cameron Mackenzie	13.666	10.866	12.700	13.533	12.866	9.800	229.694
9	Siphamandala Ngcobo	13.400		13.400	13.933	12.266		229.694
10	Singapore	40.807	34.299	35.332	42.432	38.465	35.507	226.842
10	Zi Jie Gabriel Gan	13.008	13.866	12.366	12.666	12.866	12.966	226.842
10	Aizat Bin Muhammad Jufrie		10.133	12.333	14.033	12.446	11.275	226.842
10	Kai Cheng Timothy Tay	13.433	10.300	10.366		13.133	11.266	226.842
10	Wai Ann Terry Tay	13.000		10.633	14.233			226.842
10	Wah Toon Hoe	14.366			14.166			226.842
11	Isle of Man	37.758	32.899	29.465	37.665	37.508	34.358	209.253
11	Alexander Hedges	12.900	11.733	12.033	12.866	12.608	11.758	209.253
11	Harshul Measuria	12.825	10.633	10.766	11.533	11.533	11.800	209.253
11	Anand Patel	10.700	10.533	6.666	13.266	12.400	10.800	209.253
11	Mukunda Measuria	11.633	9.766	6.033	11.100	12.500	10.400	209.253

== Qualification results ==
=== Individual all-around ===
Position	Gymnast	Floor (gymnastics)	Pommel horse	Rings (gymnastics)	Vault (gymnastics)	Parallel bars	Horizontal bar	Total	Notes
1	Max Whitlock (ENG)	15.600	15.733	14.433	15.533	14.500	14.766	90.365	Q
2	Nile Wilson (ENG)	14.458	13.633	14.383	14.500	14.833	14.800	86.607	Q
3	Daniel Keatings (SCO)	14.966	14.533	13.900	14.133	14.100	14.566	86.198	Q
4	Frank Baines (SCO)	14.066	13.600	14.700	14.833	14.966	14.633	85.806	Q
5	Daniel Purvis (SCO)	13.900	13.600	14.700	14.833	14.733	13.833	85.599	Q
6	Naoya Tsukuhara (AUS)	13.866	13.266	14.308	12.866	14.691	13.900	82.897	Q
7	Luke Wadsworth (AUS)	13.366	12.633	13.933	14.316	14.366	13.433	82.047	Q
8	Clinton Purnell (WAL)	14.533	13.400	14.333	12.933	12.733	13.366	81.298	Q
9	Iwan Mepham (WAL)	14.200	12.308	13.266	13.183	13.800	13.366	80.123	Q
10	Sean O'Hara (AUS)	13.866	12.066	13.366	13.633	12.600	13.766	79.297	Q
11	David Bishop (NZL)	14.366	12.533	12.933	13.816	13.033	12.066	78.747	Q
12	Kristofer Done (NZL)	12.100	12.566	13.300	13.633	13.933	12.866	78.398	Q
13	Ashish Kumar (IND)	14.400	11.866	11.800	13.900	13.616	12.733	78.315	Q
14	Rakesh Patra (IND)	13.500	12.000	14.266	13.566	13.233	11.666	78.231	Q
15	Zi Jie Gabriel Gan (SIN)	13.008	13.866	12.366	12.666	12.866	12.966	77.738	Q
16	Panagiotis Aristotelous (CYP)	13.200	11.566	13.300	13.566	11.833	13.533	76.998	Q
17	Mikhail Koudinov (NZL)	13.258	13.083	13.333	13.366	13.566	10.333	76.939	Q
18	Xenios Papaevripidou (CYP)	12.533	12.366	12.266	13.233	12.733	13.600	76.731	Q
19	Siphesihle Biyase (RSA)	13.200	12.466	11.633	13.800	13.000	12.533	76.632	Q
20	Tiaan Grobler (RSA)	12.833	12.466	12.833	13.233	12.666	12.566	76.597	Q
21	Aditya Rana (IND)	13.766	11.800	13.533	12.808	12.566	11.900	76.373	Q
22	Stefanos Loucaides (CYP)	12.933	11.000	12.700	13.316	13.258	12.900	76.107	Q
23	William Albert (TTO)	12.833	12.600	14.200	13.883	10.300	11.866	75.682	Q
24	Harry Owen (WAL)	13.566	11.933	12.233	13.266	13.033	10.966	74.997	Q
25	Alexander Hedges (IOM)	12.900	11.733	12.033	12.866	12.608	11.758	73.898	R1
26	Cameron Mackenzie (RSA)	13.666	10.866	12.700	13.533	12.866	9.800	73.431	R2
27	Quasi Syque Caesar (BAN)	13.233	10.166	10.666	13.333	14.133	9.933	71.398	R3
28	Harshul Measuria (IOM)	12.825	10.633	10.766	11.533	11.533	11.800	69.090	
29	Tharindu Uditha Paththapperuma (SRI)	12.100	10.966	9.700	12.533	11.566	11.333	68.198	
30	Anand Patel (IOM)	10.700	10.533	6.666	13.266	12.400	10.800	64.365	
31	Dilshan Kavin Arachchi Appuhamilage Don (SRI)	11.391	10.700	5.350	12.500	11.566	11.066	62.573	
32	Mukunda Measuria (IOM)	11.633	9.766	6.033	11.100	12.500	10.400	61.432	

=== Floor ===
Position	Gymnast	Floor (gymnastics)	Notes
1	Max Whitlock (ENG)	15.600	Q
2	Sam Oldham (ENG)	15.325	Q
3	Daniel Keatings (SCO)	14.966	Q
4	Scott Morgan (CAN)	14.933	Q
5	Clinton Purnell (WAL)	14.533	Q
6	Kristian Thomas (ENG)	14.466	
7	Nile Wilson (ENG)	14.458	
8	Ashish Kumar (IND)	14.400	Q
9	David Bishop (NZL)	14.366	Q
10	Wah Toon Hoe (SIN)	14.366	Q
11	Anderson Loran (CAN)	14.333	R1
12	Iwan Mepham (WAL)	14.200	R2
13	Frank Baines (SCO)	14.066	
14	Kent Pieterse (AUS)	13.933	
15	Daniel Purvis (SCO)	13.900	
16	Naoya Tsukuhara (AUS)	13.866	
17	Sean O'Hara (AUS)	13.866	
18	Aditya Rana (IND)	13.766	
19	Kevin Lytwyn (CAN)	13.733	
20	Cameron Mackenzie (RSA)	13.666	
21	Harry Owen (WAL)	13.566	
22	Adam Cox (SCO)	13.500	
23	Rakesh Patra (IND)	13.500	
24	Kai Cheng Timothy Tay (SIN)	13.433	
25	Siphamandala Ngcobo (RSA)	13.400	
26	Luke Wadsworth (NZL)	13.366	
27	Hairi Zaid Ahmad Saruji (MAS)	13.333	
28	Mikhail Koudinov (NZL)	13.258	
29	Quasi Syque Caesar (BAN)	13.233	
30	Panagiotis Aristotelous (CYP)	13.200	
31	Siphesihle Biyase (RSA)	13.200	
32	Robert Sansby (WAL)	13.033	
33	Zi Jie Gabriel Gan (SIN)	13.008	
34	Wai Ann Terry Tay (SIN)	13.000	
35	Stefanos Loucaides (CYP)	12.933	
36	Alexander Hedges (IOM)	12.900	
37	Tiaan Grobler (RSA)	12.833	
38	William Albert (TTO)	12.833	
39	Nathan Gafuik (CAN)	12.833	
40	Harshul Measuria (IOM)	12.825	
41	Xenios Papaevripidou (CYP)	12.533	
42	Tharindu Uditha Paththapperuma (SRI)	12.100	
43	Kristofer Done (NZL)	12.100	
44	Nordin Mohd Hamzarudin (MAS)	12.066	
45	Matthew Palmer (NZL)	11.933	
46	Mukunda Measuria (IOM)	11.633	
47	Siddarth Verma (IND)	11.400	
48	Dilshan Kavin Arachchi Appuhamilage Don (SRI)	11.391	
49	Anand Patel (IOM)	10.700	

=== Pommel horse ===
Position	Gymnast	Pommel horse	Notes
1	Max Whitlock (ENG)	15.733	Q
2	Louis Smith (ENG)	15.700	Q
3	Daniel Keatings (SCO)	14.533	Q
4	Jac Davies (WAL)	14.500	Q
5	Zi Jie Gabriel Gan (SIN)	13.866	Q
6	Anderson Loran (CAN)	13.666	Q
7	Nile Wilson (ENG)	13.633	
8	Daniel Purvis (SCO)	13.600	Q
9	Frank Baines (SCO)	13.600	
10	Clinton Purnell (WAL)	13.400	Q
11	Naoya Tsukuhara (AUS)	13.266	R1
12	Matthew Cosgrave (NIR)	13.133	R2
13	Mikhail Koudinov (NZL)	13.083	
14	Zachary Clay (CAN)	12.966	
15	Siddarth Verma (IND)	12.833	
16	Adam Cox (SCO)	12.666	
17	Luke Wadsworth (AUS)	12.633	
18	William Albert (TTO)	12.600	
19	Kristian Done (NZL)	12.566	
20	David Bishop (NZL)	12.533	
21	Tiaan Grobler (RSA)	12.466	
22	Siphesihle Biyase (RSA)	12.466	
23	Xenios Papaevripidou (CYP)	12.366	
24	Iwan Mepham (WAL)	12.308	
25	Sam Oldham (ENG)	12.100	
26	Sean O'Hara (AUS)	12.066	
27	Nathan Gafuik (CAN)	12.033	
28	Rakesh Patra (IND)	12.000	
29	Harry Owen (WAL)	11.933	
30	Ashish Kumar (IND)	11.866	
31	Aditya Rana (IND)	11.800	
32	Alexander Hedges (IOM)	11.733	
33	Panagiotis Aristotelous (CYP)	11.566	
34	Luke Carson (NIR)	11.533	
35	Jack Rickards (AUS)	11.300	
36	Reid McGowan (NZL)	11.033	
37	Stefanos Loucaides (CYP)	11.000	
38	Tharindu Uditha Paththapperuma (SRI)	10.966	
39	Cameron Mackenzie (RSA)	10.866	
40	Dilshan Kavin Arachchi Appuhamilage Don (SRI)	10.700	
41	Harshul Measuria (IOM)	10.633	
42	Anand Patel (IOM)	10.533	
43	Kai Cheng Timothy Tay (SIN)	10.300	
44	Quasi Syque Caesar (BAN)	10.166	
45	Aizat Bin Muhammad Jufrie (SIN)	10.133	
46	Mukunda Measuria (IOM)	9.766	

=== Rings ===
Position	Gymnast	Rings (gymnastics)	Notes
1	Scott Morgan (CAN)	15.200	Q
2	Kevin Lytwyn (CAN)	14.866	Q
3	Daniel Purvis (SCO)	14.700	Q
4	Sam Oldham (ENG)	14.533	Q
5	Matthew Palmer (NZL)	14.500	Q
6	Max Whitlock (ENG)	14.433	Q
7	Nile Wilson (ENG)	14.383	
8	Clinton Purnell (WAL)	14.333	Q
9	Naoya Tsukuhara (AUS)	14.308	Q
10	Rakesh Patra (IND)	14.266	R1
11	William Albert (TTO)	14.200	R2
12	Kristian Thomas (ENG)	14.000	
13	Frank Baines (SCO)	13.975	
14	Luke Wadsworth (AUS)	13.933	
15	Daniel Keatings (SCO)	13.900	
16	Herodotos Giorgallas (CYP)	13.733	
17	Anderson Loran (CAN)	13.650	
18	Jack Rickards (AUS)	13.633	
19	Aditya Rana (IND)	13.533	
20	Partha Mondal (IND)	13.433	
21	Siphamandala Ngcobo (RSA)	13.400	
22	Sean O'Hara (AUS)	13.366	
23	Mikhail Koudinov (NZL)	13.333	
24	Kristian Done (NZL)	13.300	
25	Panagiotis Aristotelou (CYP)	13.300	
26	Iwan Mepham (WAL)	13.266	
27	David Bishop (NZL)	12.933	
28	Tiaan Grobler (RSA)	12.833	
29	Cameron Mackenzie (RSA)	12.700	
30	Stefanos Loucaides (CYP)	12.700	
31	Liam Davie (SCO)	12.400	
32	Zi Jie Gabriel Gan (SIN)	12.366	
33	Aizat Bin Muhammad Jufrie (SIN)	12.333	
34	Xenios Papaevripidou (CYP)	12.266	
35	Harry Owen (WAL)	12.233	
36	Alexander Hedges (IOM)	12.033	
37	Robert Sansby (WAL)	11.966	
38	Ashish Kumar (IND)	11.800	
39	Siphesihle Biyase (RSA)	11.633	
40	Zachary Clay (CAN)	11.233	
41	Nordin Mohd Hamzarudin (MAS)	10.833	
42	Harshul Measuria (IOM)	10.766	
43	Wai Ann Terry Tay (SIN)	10.633	
44	Quasi Syque Caesar (BAN)	10.600	
45	Kai Cheng Timothy Tay (SIN)	10.366	
46	Hairi Zaid Ahmad Saruji (MAS)	10.133	
47	Tharindu Uditha Paththapperuma (SRI)	9.700	
48	Anand Patel (IOM)	6.666	
49	Mukunda Measuria (IOM)	6.033	
50	Dilshan Kavin Arachchi Appuhamilage Don (SRI)	5.350	
51	Ghulam Qadir (PAK)	2.933	

=== Vault ===
Position	Gymnast	Score 1	Score 2	Total	Notes
1	Kristian Thomas (ENG)	15.100	14.333	14.716	Q
2	Scott Morgan (CAN)	14.666	14.533	14.599	Q
3	Frank Baines (SCO)	14.566	14.100	14.333	Q
4	Wah Toon Hoe (SIN)	14.166	13.633	13.899	Q
5	Aizat Bin Muhammad Jufrie (SIN)	14.033	13.700	13.866	Q
6	Wai Ann Terry Tay (SIN)	14.233	13.400	13.816	
7	Adam Cox (SCO)	14.066	13.400	13.733	Q
8	Kent Pieterse (AUS)	13.966	13.500	13.733	Q
9	Ashish Kumar (IND)	13.900	13.366	13.633	Q
10	Panagiotos Aristotelous (CYP)	13.566	13.700	13.633	R1
11	David Bishop (NZL)	13.816	13.416	13.616	R2
12	Clinton Purnell (WAL)	12.933	14.233	13.583	
13	Siphamandala Ngcobo (RSA)	13.933	12.716	13.324	
14	Aditya Rana (IND)	12.808	13.583	13.195	
15	Cameron Mackenzie (RSA)	13.533	12.166	12.849	
16	Anand Patel (IOM)	13.266	12.366	12.816	
17	Nordin Mohd Hamzarudin (MAS)	12.633	12.400	12.516	
18	Hairi Zaid Ahmad Saruji (MAS)	11.766	12.333	12.049	
19	Dilshan Kavin Arachchi Appuhamilage Don (SRI)	12.500	11.166	11.833	
20	Alexander Hedges (IOM)	12.866	10.566	11.716	
21	Mukunda Measuria (IOM)	11.100	11.500	11.300	
−	Max Whitlock (ENG)	15.333	−	15.333	
−	Daniel Purvis (SCO)	14.833	−	14.833	
−	Sam Oldham (ENG)	14.500	−	14.500	
−	Nile Wilson (ENG)	14.500	−	14.500	
−	Luke Wadsworth (AUS)	14.316	−	14.316	
−	Anderson Loran (CAN)	14.233	−	14.233	
−	Daniel Keatings (SCO)	14.133	−	14.133	
−	Nathan Gafuik (CAN)	14.100	−	14.100	
−	William Albert (TTO)	13.883	−	13.883	
−	Siphasihle Biyase (RSA)	13.800	−	13.800	
−	Sean O'Hara (AUS)	13.633	−	13.633	
−	Kristian Done (NZL)	13.633	−	13.633	
−	Rakesh Patra (IND)	13.566	−	13.566	
−	Matthew Palmer (NZL)	13.566	−	13.566	
−	Mikhail Koudinov (NZL)	13.366	−	13.366	
−	Robert Sansby (WAL)	13.366	−	13.366	
−	Quasi Syque Caesar (BAN)	13.333	−	13.333	
−	Stefanos Loucaides (CYP)	13.316	−	13.316	
−	Dimitris Krasias (CYP)	13.266	−	13.266	
−	Harry Owen (WAL)	13.266	−	13.266	
−	Xenios Papaevripidou (CYP)	13.233	−	13.233	
−	Tiaan Grobler (RSA)	13.233	−	13.233	
−	Iwan Mepham (WAL)	13.183	−	13.183	
−	Zachary Clay (CAN)	13.100	−	13.100	
−	Naoya Tsukuhara (AUS)	12.866	−	12.866	
−	Zi Jie Gabriel Gan (SIN)	12.666	−	12.666	
−	Tharindu Uditha Paththapperuma (SRI)	12.533	−	12.533	
−	Siddarth Verma (IND)	12.066	−	12.066	
−	Ghulam Qadir (PAK)	12.000	−	12.000	
−	Harshul Measuria (IOM)	11.533	−	11.533	

=== Parallel bars ===
Position	Gymnast	Parallel bars	Notes
1	Frank Baines (SCO)	14.966	Q
2	Nile Wilson (ENG)	14.833	Q
3	Daniel Purvis (SCO)	14.733	Q
4	Naoya Tsukuhara (AUS)	14.691	Q
5	Max Whitlock (ENG)	14.500	Q
6	Kevin Lytwyn (CAN)	14.400	Q
7	Luke Wadsworth (AUS)	14.366	Q
8	Zachary Clay (CAN)	14.233	Q
9	Louis Smith (ENG)	14.133	
10	Quasi Syque Caesar (BAN)	14.133	R1
11	Daniel Keatings (SCO)	14.100	
12	Matthew Cosgrave (NIR)	14.066	R2
13	Kristian Done (NZL)	13.933	
14	Iwan Mepham (WAL)	13.800	
15	Ashish Kumar (IND)	13.616	
16	Mikhail Koudinov (NZL)	13.566	
17	Dimitris Krasias (CYP)	13.566	
18	Nathan Gafuik (CAN)	13.533	
19	Stefanos Loucaides (CYP)	13.258	
20	Rakesh Patra (IND)	13.233	
=21	Adam Cox (SCO)	13.133	
=21	Kai Cheng Timothy Tay (SIN)	13.133	
23	David Bishop (NZL)	13.033	
24	Harry Owen (WAL)	13.033	
25	Jack Rickards (AUS)	13.033	
26	Siphesihle Biyase (RSA)	13.000	
27	Luke Carson (NIR)	12.966	
28	Reid McGowan (NZL)	12.900	
29	Zi Jie Gabriel Gan (SIN)	12.866	
30	Cameron Mackenzie (RSA)	12.866	
31	Xenios Papaevripidou (CYP)	12.733	
32	Clinton Purnell (WAL)	12.733	
33	Partha Mondal (IND)	12.733	
34	Tiaan Grobler (RSA)	12.666	
35	Alexander Hedges (IOM)	12.608	
36	Sean O'Hara (AUS)	12.600	
37	Aditya Rana (IND)	12.566	
38	Mukunda Measuria (IOM)	12.500	
39	Aizat Bin Muhammad Jufrie (SIN)	12.466	
40	Anand Patel (IOM)	12.400	
41	Robert Sansby (WAL)	12.333	
42	Siphamandala Ngcobo (RSA)	12.266	
43	Panagiotis Aristotelous (CYP)	11.833	
44	Hairi Zaid Ahmad Saruji (MAS)	11.800	
45	Tharindu Uditha Paththapperuma (SRI)	11.566	
46	Dilshan Kavin Arachchi Appuhamilage Don (SRI)	11.566	
47	Harshul Measuria (IOM)	11.533	
48	William Albert (TTO)	10.300	

=== Horizontal bar ===
Position	Gymnast	Horizontal bar	Notes
1	Kristian Thomas (ENG)	15.033	Q
2	Nile Wilson (ENG)	14.800	Q
3	Max Whitlock (ENG)	14.766	
4	Frank Baines (SCO)	14.633	Q
5	Daniel Keatings (SCO)	14.566	Q
6	Naoya Tsukuhara (AUS)	13.900	Q
7	Kevin Lytwyn (CAN)	13.900	Q
8	Zachary Clay (CAN)	13.833	Q
9	Daniel Purvis (SCO)	13.833	
10	Anderson Loran (CAN)	13.800	
11	Sean O'Hara (AUS)	13.766	Q
12	Kent Pieterse (AUS)	13.766	
13	Dimitris Krasias (CYP)	13.700	R1
14	Xenios Papaevripidou (CYP)	13.600	R2
15	Panagiotis Aristotelous (CYP)	13.533	
16	Luke Wadsworth (AUS)	13.433	
17	Clinton Purnell (WAL)	13.366	
18	Iwan Mepham (WAL)	13.366	
19	Nathan Gafuik (CAN)	13.333	
20	Reid McGowan (NZL)	13.133	
21	Zi Jie Gabriel Gan (SIN)	12.966	
22	Robert Sansby (WAL)	12.933	
23	Stefanos Loucaides (CYP)	12.900	
24	Kristian Done (NZL)	12.866	
25	Ashish Kumar (IND)	12.733	
26	Tiaan Grobler (RSA)	12.566	
27	Siphasihle Biyase (RSA)	12.533	
28	Liam Davie (SCO)	12.133	
29	David Bishop (NZL)	12.066	
30	Aditya Rana (IND)	11.900	
31	William Albert (TTO)	11.866	
32	Harshul Measuria (IOM)	11.800	
33	Partha Mondal (IND)	11.766	
34	Alexander Hedges (IOM)	11.758	
35	Rakesh Patra (IND)	11.666	
36	Tharindu Uditha Paththapperuma (SRI)	11.333	
37	Aizat Bin Muhammad Jufrie (SIN)	11.275	
38	Kai Cheng Timothy Tay (SIN)	11.266	
39	Dilshan Kavin Arachchi Appuhamilage Don (SRI)	11.066	
40	Harry Owen (WAL)	10.966	
41	Anand Patel (IOM)	10.800	
42	Mukunda Measuria (IOM)	10.400	
43	Mikhail Koudinov (NZL)	10.333	
44	Quasi Syque Caesar (BAN)	9.933	
45	Cameron Mackenzie (RSA)	9.800	
