= Joshua Jefferis =

Australian artistic gymnast

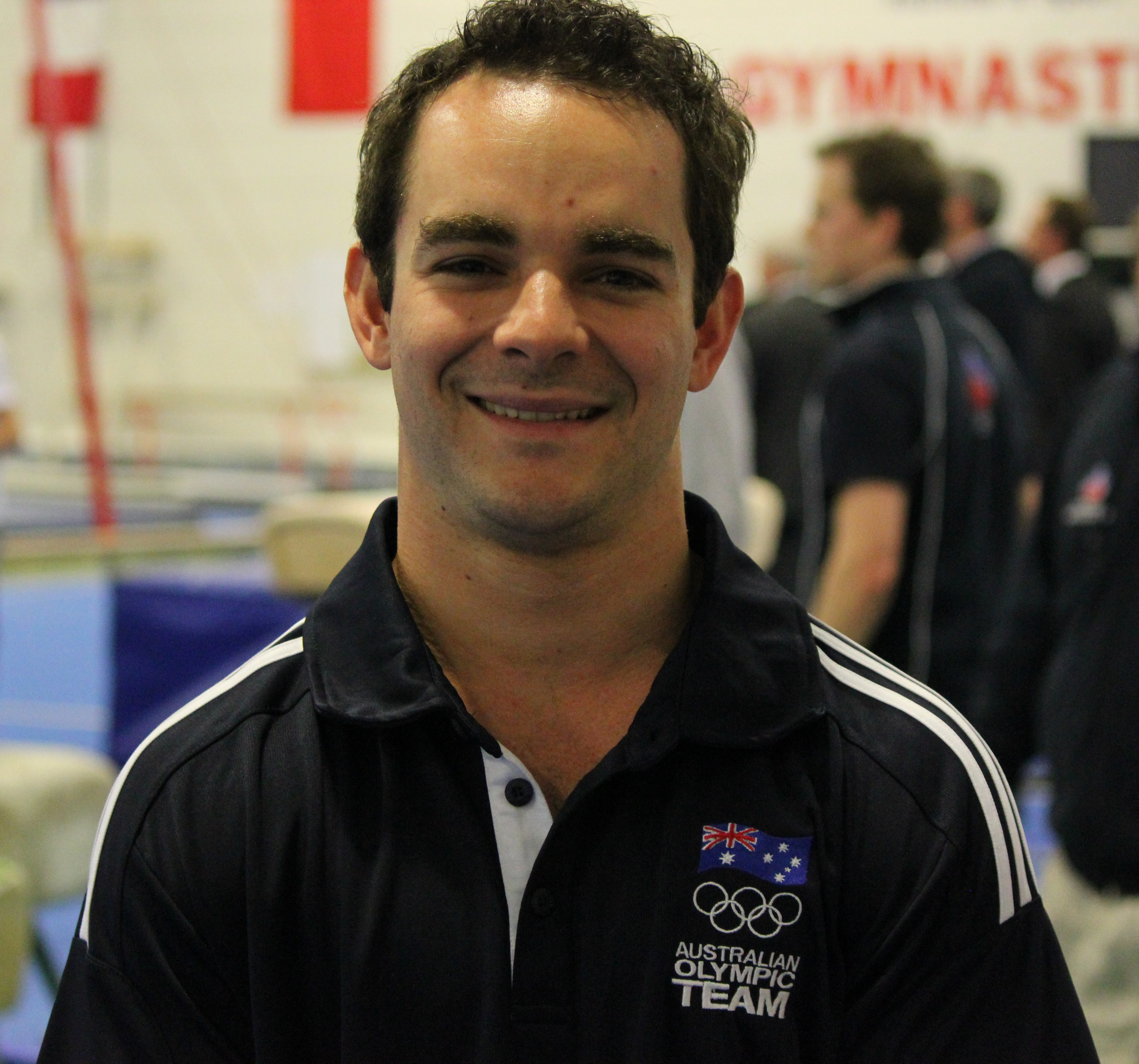
- Jefferis at an Olympic team announcement

Personal information
- Born: 29 August 1985 (age 41) Brisbane, Australia
- Height: 155 cm (5 ft 1 in)

Gymnastics career
- Discipline: Men's artistic gymnastics
- Country represented: Australia
- Club: Australian Institute of Sport
Medal record
Commonwealth Games
| Gold medal – first place | 2006 Melbourne | All-around |
| Gold medal – first place | 2006 Melbourne | Rings |
| Gold medal – first place | 2010 Delhi | Team |
| Gold medal – first place | 2010 Delhi | Parallel bars |
| Silver medal – second place | 2006 Melbourne | Team |
| Bronze medal – third place | 2006 Melbourne | Parallel bars |
| Bronze medal – third place | 2010 Delhi | All-around |
Pacific Rim Championships
| Bronze medal – third place | 2012 Everett | Rings |

Joshua Jefferis (born 29 August 1985) is an Australian artistic gymnast. He was an Australian Institute of Sport scholarship holder. He has won medals at the 2006 and 2010 Commonwealth Games.

== Early life and education ==
Jefferis was born on 29 August 1985 in Brisbane, Queensland. He was educated at the Anglican Church Grammar School. Jefferis started gymnastics when he was only two years old. He was first coached by Anthony Beake at Y-West. In 1992, as a seven-year-old with Y-West, Jefferis became part of the Queensland HPC development program and stayed with the program for three years.

== Gymnastics career ==
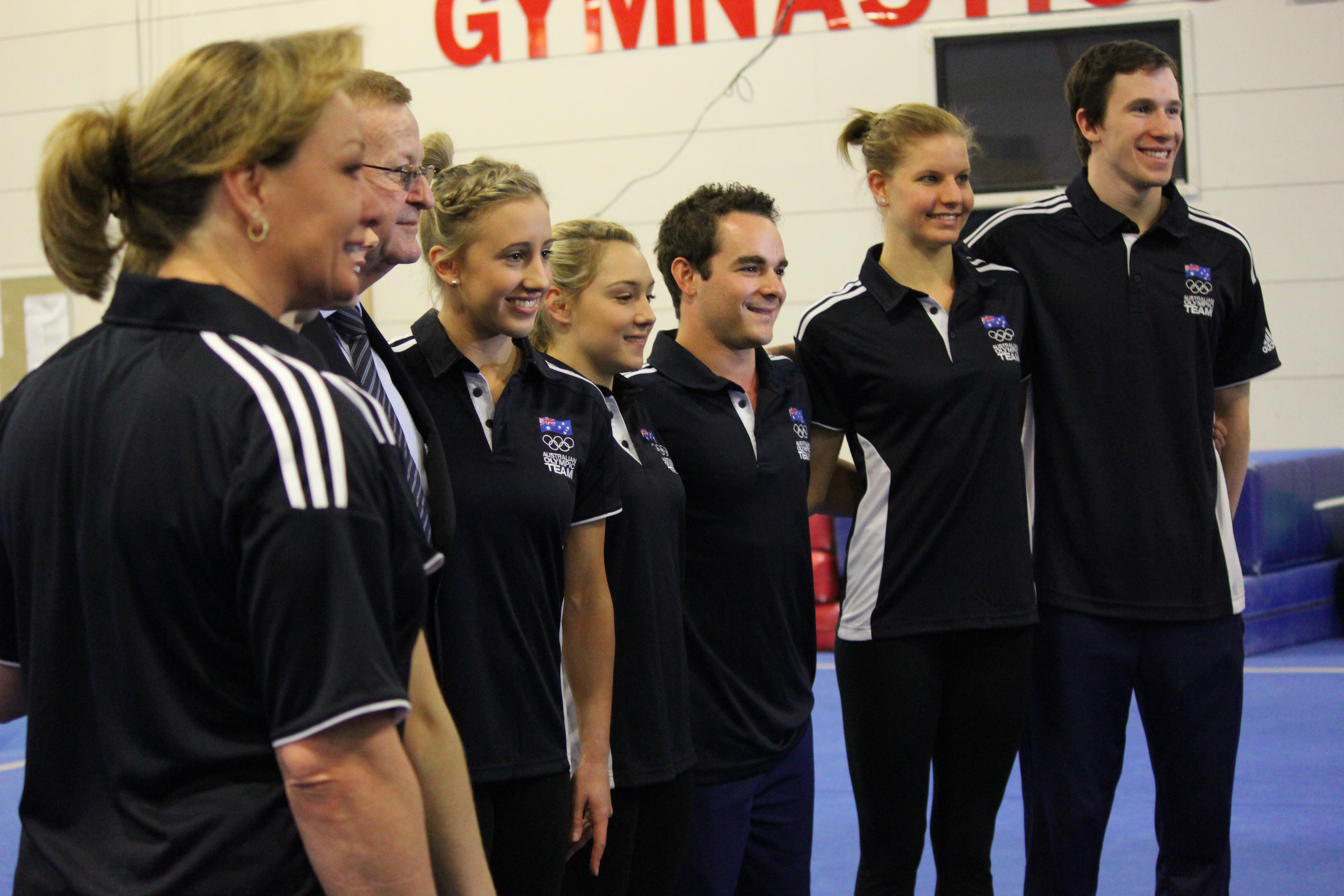
Jefferis with AOC president John Coates and Australian gymnastic Olympic team members at an event at the Australian Institute of Sport

Jefferis is a parallel bars and rings specialist. From 1995 to 2005, he trained and was on scholarship with the Queensland Academy of Sport, before he earned a scholarship with the Australian Institute of Sport in 2005. Since 2005, he has been coached by Vladimir Vatkin.

Jefferis represented Australia at the 2002, 2006 and 2010 Commonwealth Games. At the 2006 Commonwealth Games, he earned a gold medal in the men's all around event, a gold medal in the rings, and a silver medal in the team competition. At the 2010 Commonwealth Games, he helped Australia win their first gold medal in the men's team event, and took an individual gold on the parallel bars and bronze in the all around event. He competed in the World Championships in 2003, 2005, 2006, 2007, 2010, and 2011. At the 2003 Championships, he was the youngest member of the Australian all-around team. His best performance at Worlds was twelfth place in the all-around competition in 2006.

In January 2012, Jefferis was passed over by Gymnastics Australia to participate at a London Olympic Games test event. However, after Sam Offord injured his ankle, he beat out training partner and national team teammate Thomas Pichler for a spot on the team. Jefferis represented Australia at the 2012 Summer Olympics in men's artistic gymnastics. He was officially selected on 1 June 2012, one of the first to be named to Australia's gymnastic squad, and was Australia's only male artistic gymnast at the Games. Jefferis was twenty-six years old when he made his Olympic debut. His family faced difficulty getting tickets to watch him compete, as Gymnastics Australia was only able to secure two tickets per gymnast at the Games.
