= Gymnastics Australia =

Australian gymnastics governing body

- Sport: Gymnastics
- Jurisdiction: Australia
- Abbreviation: GA
- Founded: 1949
- Affiliation: FIG
- Affiliation date: 1954
- Regional affiliation: Australia
- Headquarters: South Melbourne, Victoria
- Location: Australia
- President: Sam Offord
- CEO: Chris O'Brien (interim)

Official website
- www.gymnastics.org.au
- (Australia)

Gymnastics Australia (GA) is the governing body for the sport of gymnastics in Australia.

== History ==
Gymnastics in Australia is thought to have originated in the early 20th century by eastern European immigrants. It wasn't until after World War I, when Australia was in the Great Depression, that people started turning to organisations like the YWCA for support. From these community-based groups, the sport began to flourish. Around the same time, gymnastics was included in the Geelong Grammar, Wesley College and Carey Grammar school curriculum. Australians participated in the sport for the first time at an Olympic Games at the Melbourne Games in Melbourne.

The body was founded on 8 September 1949 as the Australian Gymnastics Union (AGU), with representatives from Victoria, New South Wales and Queensland. After the formation of this national body, the first Australian National Championships for men were held in Melbourne in 1950, with subsequent competitions held annually in ongoing years.

Affiliation was accepted by the Australian Olympic Federation in 1951 and by the International Federation of Gymnastics in 1954, at which point AGU began conforming to international regulations.

Western Australia became affiliated with the AGU in 1955, followed by South Australia in 1956.

The first international gymnastics competition was held in Melbourne as part of the 1956 Olympic Games, with full teams for both men and women competing in gymnastics for the first time. During this period, negotiations began to standardise gymnastics equipment in Australia, allowing for a better standard of training across the country.

While women represented Australia in gymnastics at the 1956 Olympic Games, women were not included in the Australian Gymnastics Championships until 1959.

In 1961, AGU accepted the idea of including junior gymnastics championships for the first time. The first under 18 men's competition was introduced formally in 1965.

In 1968, the AGU formally changed its name to the Australian Amateur Gymnastic Union (AAGU), seeing the Australian Capital Territory becoming officially affiliated the following year. 1969 also saw the introduction of the first Under 19 Men's competition and the first under 16 Women's competition.

Tasmania became affiliated with the AAGU in 1970.

In 1977, AAGU changed its name again, becoming known as the Australian Gymnastic Federation (AGF). Rhythmic sportive gymnastics was included under the AGF umbrella at this time, which saw Men's and Women's Olympic Gymnastics being renamed to Men's Artistic Gymnastics (MAG) and Women's Artistic Gymnastics (WAG) within Australia as part of its national formation.

AGF was part of the formation of the Commonwealth Gymnastic Federation in 1978.

The first international gymnastics medal for Australia was won by Lindsay Nylund from Western Australia, who placed second in the 1978 Canada Commonwealth Games All-Round, and contributed to the first Australian team medal, a bronze won by the Australian men's team, at the same Games. Further recognition came in 1979 as the Federation International de Gymnstique Elite pin, a recognition by the international governing body for performing at 90% or better on overall scores at a world championship or Olympic games, was awarded to Phil Cheetham, Lindsay Nylund, Kerry Bayliss and Marina Sulicich based on their performance at the 1979 World Championships.

AGF was officially incorporated as a group in 1981, becoming Australian Gymnastic Federation Inc.

Also in 1981, the Australian Institute of Sport was established as a nationally-funded high-performance training centre for Australian athletes. It founding eight sports including gymnastics, which received its own specialised, fully equipped training gym in 1982. The AIS program began including rhythmic sportive gymnastics from 1983 onwards. The AIS gymnastics program was largely based in Canberra from 1981 until 2010, offering residential programs for both male and female athletes. In 2011, AIS gymnastics began being delivered as a camps based program, with all AIS athlete scholarships being discontinued at the end of 2013. Multiple states followed suit in setting up similar high-performance training programs, importing coaches with successful gymnastics program backgrounds from countries such as the Soviet Union, China, Romania and Japan to help run these programs, such as the WAIS program in 1988.

Australia's first international gold medal was won in 1989 by Ken Meredith from Queensland, winning at the Liberation Cup in Czechoslovakia. The first Australian team gold medal was awarded to the women's team at the 1990 Pacific Alliance Championships. The Pacific Alliance Championships also saw the men's team win bronze.

In 1994, Australia's national gymnastics teams competed at the Pacific Alliance in New Zealand and the Commonwealth Games in Canada to immense success. In New Zealand, the men's team won silver and the women's team won bronze, with the men winning 11 medals, women winning 5 medals and rhythmic team winning 6 medals (5 of which were gold) in Canada.

A General Gymnastics Development Director was first appointed in 1986 (Peter Murden), to help develop and establish a new discipline of gymnastics to focus on a more recreational non-competitive participation style of gymnastics. At this time, the kindergym program was also formalised, with its first national coaching accreditation scheme approved.

In 1995, Sports Aerobics was established as a gymnastics discipline, with all Australian finalists at the world's first FIG Sport Aerobic World Championships being awarded FIG Elite Pins, as well as Australia walking away with a silver medal in the individual women's event, 5th in the pairs division and 7th in the trio division.

In 1995, an enquiry was held into the Women's Artistic Gymnastics program at the AIS surrounding abuse allegations, with the coach and program ultimately exonerated at the time.

In 2000, the AGF changed its name once more. Its current name is Gymnastics Australia.

== Present day ==
Gymnastics Australia runs a head office in Melbourne, Victoria, acting as Australia's representative body to FIG.

Gymnastics Australia coordinates and provides gymnastics for Australians through eight Association Members, managing a total of 247,073 registered athletes (77.7% female, 22.2% male, 0.03% other, 0.03% non-binary with 93% being under the age of 12), 627 affiliated clubs, 7807 coaches and 3099 judges at the end of 2022:

- Gymnastics Australian Capital Territory
  - 6454 athlete members
    - 26% male, 74% female
    - 91.75% 12 years and under
  - 247 technical members
    - 136 coaches
    - 11 judges
    - 100 dual coach/judge certified
  - 5 affiliated clubs
- Gymnastics New South Wales
  - 72,169 registered athlete members
    - 30% of National athlete membership
    - 77% female, 22.5% male, 0.5% non-binary
  - 2379 technical members
    - Largest number involved in Women's Artistic Gymnastics
  - 215 affiliated clubs
    - 46% in Sydney metro
    - 44% in regional NSW
    - 10% mobile providers
- Gymnastics Northern Territory
  - 2142 athletes
    - 24% male members, 76% female members
    - 92.5% of members aged 12 and under
  - 92 technical members
  - 7 Affiliated clubs
- Gymnastics Queensland
  - 57,102 registered athletes
  - 2424 Technical members
    - 1,621 coaches
    - 803 judges
  - 118 affiliated member clubs
- Gymnastics South Australia
  - 16,562 athletes
    - 74.79% female, 25.14% male, 0.06% not disclosed
    - 93% aged 12 years and under
  - 682 technical members
  - 66 member clubs
- Gymnastics Tasmania
  - 6084 registered athletes
    - 73% female, 27% male
    - 92% aged 12 years and under
  - 227 Technical members
    - 113 coaches
    - 9 judges
    - 105 coach/judge dual certified
  - 12 affiliated clubs
  - (Note - Participation numbers taken from 2021 annual report as 2022 annual report not publicly available)
- Gymnastics Victoria
  - 63,931 registered athletes
  - 2139 technical members
    - Largest number registered for a single state in 2022
  - 113 affiliated clubs
- Gymnastics Western Australia
  - 23,237 athlete members
    - 79.17% female, 20.78% male, 0.05% non-binary
    - 93.8% aged 12 years and under
  - 730 technical members
  - 58 clubs and associated members

Gymnastics Australia sets the routines and routine guidelines for the National Levels Program which are used by gymnasts around the country.

== Prominent Gymnastics Australia gymnasts ==
Prominent gymnasts from Australia under Gymnastics Australia include:

- Lauren Mitchell (WAG) - Retired 2016 as Australia's most decorated gymnast
- Georgia Godwin (WAG)
- Ashleigh Brennan (WAG)
- Daria Joura (WAG)
- Larissa Miller (WAG)
- Georgia Bonora (WAG)
- Hollie Dykes (WAG)
- Emily Whitehead (WAG)
- Joshua Jefferis (MAG)
- Heath Thorpe (MAG)
- Sam Offord (MAG)
- Tyson Bull (MAG)
- Graham Bond (MAG)
- Belinda Archer (WAG)
- Philippe Rizzo (MAG)
- Dominic Clarke (TRA)
- Ji Wallace

(TRA) Australia's ONLY Olympic Medal - Silver won at Sydney 2000 games

== Gymsports under Gymnastics Australia ==
Within Australia, there are currently 8 recognised types of gymnastics registered under Gymnastics Australia: Parkour, Gymnastics for All, Acrobatic Gymnastics, Aerobic Gymnastics, Trampoline, Rhythmic Gymnastics, Women's Artistic Gymnastics and Men's Artistic Gymnastics.

Until 2018, Gymnastics Australia was also the governing body for cheerleading within Australia, recognising it as a type of gymsport. However, they stepped down from this role in 2018.

=== Parkour ===
Parkour is the newest gymsport recognised by the International Federation of Gymnastics, with athletes facing a range of obstacles including bars, ramps and boxes up to 2.5m tall across the space. Within the space, they compete in two events: speed and freestyle. In speed, the goal is to make it through two laps of obstacles within the fastest time. In freestyle, athletes are given 70 seconds to impress the judges with their skills on the obstacles, bars and floor, with points given for difficulty and deducted for execution errors.

=== Gymnastics for All ===
Gymnastics for All serves as an entry point into gymnastics within Australia, with a range of GfA programs falling under this gymsport banner that serve different purposes. These include:

- Launchpad: Launchpad is a school-aged gymnastics program that is delivered in both gymnastics clubs and schools, allowing school students to explore safe and enjoyable gymnastics activities relative to their abilities and stage of development.
- FreeG: FreeG or Freestyle Gymnastics is similar to parkour in the way that it encourages participants to use traditional gymnastics equipment in new ways, being similar to ninja warrior programs with its focus on coordination, agility, spatial awareness and strength.
- KinderGym: KinderGym programs are designed for preschool-aged children, providing a safe environment to experience a range of movement activities to develop the skills to think, create, construct and solve problems with their own bodies.
- TeamGym: TeamGym combines elements of tumbling, mini tramp and dance to create a three apparatus competition event for teams of 6 - 12 members, encouraging individual skill development and teamwork. The program is split into novice, intermediate and advanced levels, with the ability to incorporate harder skills depending on the competency of the athlete and coach.
- Fitter for Life Gymnastics: Fitter for Life allows for a fundamental movement program and social opportunity for those who wish to improve their mobility, strength and coordination with friends. This program is designed to be tailored to the level of ability and mobility of those within the class to meet their needs, with a focus on everyday activities, with heavy marketing towards older individuals.
- Performance and Display Gymnastics: Performance gymnastics allows for both large and small groups to perform at state, national and international levels, with a focus on entertainment, innovation, variety, skill safety, technique and overall presentation. Within this gymsport, it is as just as important to engage the audience as it is to show quality skills.
- GymAbility: GymAbility aims to support coaches to deliver movement programs that are inclusive of everyone's ability, allowing for inclusion within the sport of gymnastics for disabled people of any capacity including as athletes, coaches, judges and volunteers.

=== Acrobatic Gymnastics ===
Acrobatic gymnastics as a gymsport involving partnerships of gymnasts working together in Pairs(Men's, Women's and Mixed) or Groups (women's trios) or (men's four) to perform figures of static acrobatics such as balances and holds, dynamic acrobatics such as lifts, throws and twists, tumbling and dance set to music. The Acrobats perform a Balance exercise, a Dynamic exercise and in international categories, a Combined exercise. The Combined exercise was once a routine performed only in a final, however nowadays the Combined exercise is considered as an "apparatus" of its own. With then it being repeated for the finals.

=== Aerobic Gymnastics ===
Aerobic gymnastics combines mainstream aerobic exercise sequences with gymnastics difficulty elements, transitions, interactions between athletes and lifts, inspired by the music that the athletes perform to.

=== Trampoline ===
Trampoline focuses on teaching aerial skills across three apparatus and four disciplines:

- Individual Trampoline: In Individual Trampoline, competitors perform two routines in the qualifying round and one routine in the final round on a trampoline apparatus. Each routine includes a combination of ten skills, ranging from aerial shapes to somersaults with twists, with difficulty points awarded based on execution. The 2nd and Final Voluntary routine allows competitors to choose their skills and is also judged on performance and degree of difficulty.
- Synchronised Trampoline: Synchronised Trampoline involves two competitors bouncing on separate trampolines and performing identical routines simultaneously. They are judged based on their synchronisation and receive execution scores. Any deviation from the identical routine results in the termination of the routine and scoring only for the part performed correctly before the error.
- Double Mini Trampoline: In Double-Mini Trampoline, competitors perform two sequences of two skills each. These sequences include a mount skill over the penalty zone and a dismount or spotter skill on the flat bed, with no repetition of skills allowed in the four passes performed in the preliminary round and finals. Skills are not considered repeats if performed in different parts of the double mini.
- Tumbling: In tumbling, competitors execute either 5 or 8 skill passes, depending on the division/event. Age finals involve one pass, while International finals require two passes. These passes take place on a 25-meter sprung/air floor and consist of a combination of forward, backward, and side-ward rotational elements performed with precision and control.

=== Rhythmic Gymnastics ===
Rhythmic gymnastics blends sport and art, with gymnasts competing on a 13m^{2} floor to music, incorporating four different apparatus to showcase movements including throws, circles and spirals. Rhythmic gymnastics calls on flexibility, musical interpretation and acrobatics, being influenced by ballet and modern dance. The apparatus must be kept in constant motion, being used by both hands and thrown into the air, with gymnasts using a rope, hoop, ball, clubs and/or ribbon.

=== Women's Artistic Gymnastics (WAG) ===
Women's artistic gymnastics is a highly competitive and visually captivating sport, featuring a range of disciplines performed by female athletes, with routines scored on execution, degree of difficulty and artistry/presentation. It comprises four primary components:

- Vault: Vault is both the name of the event as well as the primary piece of equipment within the event, with a gymnast sprinting down a runway before leaping onto a springboard and directing their body hands first towards the vault. The gymnast then blocks from the vaulting platform before rotating her body to land in a standing position on the other side of the vault.
- Uneven bars: This apparatus consists of two horizontal bars set at different heights, challenging gymnasts to perform intricate routines filled with swings, releases, and seamless transitions.
- Beam: This event consists of a narrow, elevated beam, typically measuring 4 inches wide, upon which gymnasts perform a series of acrobatic and dance movements.
- Floor: Within this event, gymnasts perform a choreographed routine involving a combination of tumbling passes, leaps, jumps and dance movements on a padded mat, accompanied by music, striving for perfect execution and artistic expression.

=== Men's Artistic Gymnastics (MAG) ===
Men's artistic gymnastics is a highly competitive and physically demanding sport, involving male athletes performing a series of routines across six different apparatuses while being scored on execution, difficulty and presentation. These apparatus include:

- Floor: Within this event, gymnasts perform a choreographed routine involving a combination of tumbling passes, leaps, jumps and dance movements on a padded mat. MAG routines are not accompanied by music, and athletes are required to touch each corner of the floor at least once of their routine.
- Pommel Horse: Athletes perform intricate routines that involve swinging, circling, and maintaining balance on an apparatus characterised by its elongated rectangular shape with two cylindrical handles, or pommels, mounted in the centre. Success in this event hinges on the gymnast's ability to seamlessly transition between complex movements while demonstrating impeccable control and artistry.
- Rings: In this event, athletes perform routines on a pair of suspended circular rings, executing a series of swinging based elements and intricate holds.
- Vault: Vault is both the name of the event as well as the primary piece of equipment within the event, with a gymnast sprinting down a runway before leaping onto a springboard and directing their body hands first towards the vault. The gymnast then blocks from the vaulting platform before rotating her body to land in a standing position on the other side of the vault.
- Parallel Bars: This apparatus features two horizontal bars set parallel to each other at adjustable heights. Gymnasts perform a captivating routine that combines swinging elements, intricate handstands, and daring releases and catches.
- Horizontal Bar: This apparatus consists of a horizontal metal bar suspended at a considerable height, requiring gymnasts to perform a thrilling array of high-flying acrobatics, releases, and intricate swings.

=== Cheerleading (Gymsport from 2002 - 2018) ===
Gymnastics Australia began acting as the governing body of Australian cheerleading in 2002, including the sport under their "General Gymnastics" stream and establishing a working committee led by Nerine Cooper, as well as holding the first national championship. By 2004, Gymnastics Queensland had begun recognising cheerleading as its own unique cheersport, with Gymnastics Australia soon following.

In July 2008, GA formed the Australian Cheer Union (ACU) as a branch of GA to serve as the body to standardise cheer rules, advance coach and judge education and safety, and coordinate a national calendar for cheerleading. ACU as a GA branch would be recognised as the official governing body by the International Cheerleading Federation (ICF), International All Star Federation (IASF), International Cheerleading Union (ICU) and the Australian Sports Commission (ASC).

However after a steady decline in participation in GA's cheerleading programs despite growth in programs under other providers, many attempts at independent consultants restructuring their governance, and a petition asking for GA to resign as governing body, GA finally stepped from their role as the official governing body of cheerleading in Australia in 2018 and ceased recognising cheerleading as a gymsport.

== Abuse Investigations ==
Over its history, Gymnastics Australia has been embroiled in a number of abuse investigations due to incidents that have happened under their governance, which have exposed a long-standing culture of abuse within gymnastics in Australia.

=== Opie Report - 1995 ===
In 1995, the Australian Institute of Sport (AIS) high-performance Women's Artistic Gymnastics program faced accusations of Coach Mark Calton being emotionally, verbally and physically abusive to athletes under his care. These allegations included Calton allegedly hitting a 10-year-old gymnast, and two gymnasts alleging their coach had called them "fat" and "ugly".

Within the same year, a former AIS gymnast filed a lawsuit against the Australian Sport Commission, alleging that the AGF/AIS high-performance training program had caused her to suffer from anorexia nervosa.

As a result, Sports Minister John Faulkner commissioned Hayden Opie, an independent sports lawyer, to examine these allegations and conduct a thorough investigation.

The subsequent report, known as the Opie Report, claimed that the physical assault of the 10-year-old gymnast had resulted after the child had "provoked Calton into losing his self-control", but ultimately did not find that Calton had struck her. Opie recommended counselling for the coach, and not the gymnast, while also dismissing the emotional abuse allegations as the terms "fat" and "ugly" were often used in high-performance training environments within gymnastics. Ultimately, the report concluded that ""No systematic or widespread abuse of AIS female gymnasts has been found to occur at any time. Major change at the AIS is not necessary."

This investigation was criticised for being constrained by a narrow framework, and not addressing the broader issues within the sport, resulting in the report's recommendations addressing symptoms as band-aid fixes rather than the underlying problems. It has also been criticised for legitimising and approving of abusive activities occurring.

Critics also pointed out that "All parties involved in the sport of gymnastics had an interest in containing any perceived problems that might threaten the sport."

=== Dobbs Trial and Sentencing - 2003 ===
In July 2003, Australian gymnastics coach, Geoffery Robert Dobbs, was formally sentenced to life in jail with no prospect of parole on charges of molesting and producing child sexual abuse material of 62 girls aged from 12 months to 15 years old between 1972 and 1999. Detectives believed that in total, he may have abused more than 300 girls, leaving up to 240 alleged victims unaccounted for. His victims included athletes whom he had obtained access to through his role as a gymnastics coach.

=== Belooussov Coach Suspension - 2013 ===
In 2021, the Australian Institute of Sport (AIS) responded to enquiries by the ABC to confirm the 2013 suspension of husband and wife coaches, Sasha and Olga Belooussov, for an 18-month period for the verbal abuse of a gymnast.

This suspension had remained unreported for eight years due to the complaint handling process by Gymnastics Australia, which had meant that those involved, including the verbally abused gymnast and GA, were barred from speaking due to confidentiality provisions.

Despite this period of suspension, the Belooussov couple returned to coaching gymnastics in Australia, returning to their roles as personal coaches for Georgia Godwin (Australian Commonwealth Games and Olympian medalist), GA assistant coach, coaching at Queensland gymnastics club Delta Gymnastics, and winning the GA WAG International Coach/Coaching Team of the Year Award in 2019.

=== National Centre of Excellence Investigation - 2018 ===
During January 2018, the gymnastics world was exposed to the horrors of abuse in gymnastics as the Larry Nassar abuse trial played out publicly, raising awareness of child safety in sports, particularly within gymnastics, with victim Aly Raisman urging sporting bodies to ensure safeguards to ensure the mistakes of the United States were not repeated.

In response to the Larry Nassar case, Gymnastics Australia CEO Kitty Chiller made a statement regarding how the USA scandal had prompted GA to carry out an audit of their processes and policies, including an education process to empower "any young member or any member of a gymnastics association to know that they have a voice and to know where that voice will be heard."

Kitty Chiller also at the time denied that GA had an existing problem with child abuse, stating "there's never been any evidence or complaints that anyone's been unhappy within the Gymnastics Australia environment" and GA's audit did not uncover any practices that needed to be changed.

However, within the same year, parents reported to Gymnastics Australia that their children as young as eight were being regularly verbally and physically abused at the GA National Centre of Excellence (NCE) in Melbourne.

In these complaints, parents alleged their children were punished via methods such as "making them swing on the bar until their hands bled, doing squats until their knees gave out, or making them do handstands and stay upside down until they felt sick and fell over" with punishments being given for any misdemeanour from being perceived as not paying attention or being cheeky to not performing to the coach's standards. Athletes were also allegedly regularly yelled at multiple times within a training session, and not being allowed to comfort one another, with training sessions being closed to parents despite medical appointments occurring during training sessions. ABC News confirmed 16 parents, with the majority of their children being under the age of 15 years old and spending between 20 and 33 hours a week training at the NCE.

When the parents took their complaints formally to GA, GA appointed an independent investigator in May. However, after receiving an interim report from the independent investigator, GA closed the investigation in August, with a letter from Kitty Chiller to the parents citing that the majority of allegations were "incomplete" and "based on the investigator's interim report, GA did not find that any staff member was in breach of their employment with GA". This letter also stated that "the investigation took longer than anticipated and an extension would likely increase the burden placed on all parties involved" with no fault or wrongdoing being concluded.

George Tatai, who spent 21 years on the GA board and eight years as a member of the International Gymnastics Federation, holding an Order of Australia Medal for his work in the sport, spoke out against the way that GA handled this investigation stating that they were paying lip-service to the parents' concerns and protecting GA ahead of the athletes.

"It [Gymnastics Australia] seems to have morphed into an organisation that is protecting the organisation ahead of the interest of the athletes and the community."

— George Tatai, "National Centre of Excellence inflicting cruel 'punishments' on child gymnasts, parents allege", ABC News, 2018

One of the mothers then went on to make a formal complaint in 2020, using the newly formed GA independent complaints process, the "Supplementary Complaints Management Process" (SCMP), to allege that Kitty Chiller should not have closed this investigation as the CEO of Gymnastics Australia at the time. This 2020 complaint was then closed and never investigated, being deemed out of scope as the SCMP limited valid complaints to only those involving direct conduct towards an athlete, therefore excluding officials who may have handled historical complaints or had knowledge of abuse from investigation under this process.

However new information was discovered in 2022 in Senate Estimates that found that the SCMP was co-drafted by those within Kitty Chiller's office, with GA providing input into the policy's design instead of the process being fully independent.

When the SCMP policy was announced in 2020, Sport Integrity Australia (SIA) and the National Sports Tribunal (NST) had released a media statement confirming they would play a key role in the SCMP policy, with SIA facilitating an independent and comprehensive assessment of individual complaints and assisting with the management and coordination of investigation in accordance with assessor recommendations while NST planned to provide mediation, conciliation and tribunal hearings as needed.

With the release of this information within the Senate Estimates, ABC News began an investigation to explore who had made the decision to exclude officials from investigations under the SCMP, resulting in SIA, NST and GA all making conflicting statements to the ABC reporters. SIA stated that it was GA who was ultimately responsible for the SCMP, with the policy being developed by the NST for the board of GA to provide approval with SIA's input being only on sections relevant to their role. The NST statement stated that SCMP was a GA policy, and as such, GA was involved in its development up to board level, noting that both SIA and the NST assisted GA in its development. Meanwhile, GA distanced itself completely from the policy, stating that the policy " was developed by the NST, with input from SIA, in relation to their role in the process. This policy was endorsed by the Gymnastics Australia Board."

=== Australian Human Rights Commission Investigation - 2020 - 2021 ===
In 2020, the documentary film Athlete A was released, following investigative journalists as they broke the story of USA Gymnastics team doctor Larry Nassar sexually assaulting young female gymnasts, and the following allegations and trials around USA Gymnastics regarding the abuse they had suffered.

In the aftermath of the documentary release, dozens of Australian gymnasts took to social media to speak their own allegations of abuse within Australian gymnastics, exposing that the culture wasn't unique to gymnastics within the U.S.

As a result, Gymnastics Australia (GA) announced an independent review of its own culture and practices, stating "those experiences are simply not acceptable."

For this review, GA requested the Australian Human Rights Commission (AHRC) to act as the independent body to ensure the integrity of the review, with the report completed in 2021.

This report was undertaken by a dedicated team of AHRC staff, led by the Sex Discrimination Commission with input from the National Children's Commissioner. These staff all had expertise in responding sensitively in a trauma informed way to a range of issues such as sexual assault, sexual harassment and abuse. While the original planned release date was within the first quarter of 2021, the community interest in the review was so strong that AHRC extended its consultation timeline to allow more participation with the review.

Participation opened in September 2020, with all past and present members of the gymnastics community in Australia including athletes, coaches, staff, volunteers and administrators being encouraged to participate through a series of focus groups, interviews and written submissions.

Policies and procedures were also reviewed by AHRC, with the way these policies and procedures were implemented and the governance structures surrounding this implementation being examined.

Throughout the investigation, athletes spoke out about the abusive techniques used in gymnastics training to the media, leading to lawyers forming groups to consider taking legal action due to athletes' statements that the Australian Institute of Sport (AIS) had ignored allegations of physical and psychological abuse for decades.

AHRC received a total of 138 written submissions to the enquiry, with 47 interviews being conducted with 57 participants. This included both current and former athletes, their families, staff, coaches and other relevant personnel.

AHRC launched their final copy of the report on May 3, 2021, titled "Changing the Routine".

This report exposed an environment with a "win at all costs" mentality that normalised abuse, and a lack of understanding and prevention of the full range of child abuse and neglect behaviours in gymnastics, which was supported by a governance structure that was set up in an unsuitable manner for effective child safeguarding.

A total of five overarching key findings were made in the report:

- "Current coaching practices create a risk of abuse and harm to athletes. Additionally, hiring practices for coaching staff lack accountability and there are inconsistent policies and systems to regulate their behaviour."
- "There is an insufficient focus on understanding and preventing the full range of behaviours that can constitute child abuse and neglect in gymnastics."
- "A focus on ’winning-at-all-costs’ and an acceptance of negative and abusive coaching behaviours has resulted in the silencing of the athlete voice and an increased risk of abuse and harm with significant short and long term impacts to gymnasts."
- "There is an ongoing focus in gymnastics on the ‘ideal body’, especially for young female athletes. This, in addition to inappropriate and harmful weight management and body shaming practices, can result in the development of eating disorders and disordered eating which continue long after the athlete has left the sport."
- "Gymnastics at all levels has not appropriately and adequately addressed complaints of abuse and harm and are not effectively safeguarding children and young people. Contributing factors include a lack of internal expertise and resources and complicated governance structures."

As a result of these findings, the report made a total of 12 recommendations:

1. "Transform education to skills development for coaches"
2. "Strengthen coach engagement and accountability"
3. "Develop a national social media policy"
4. "Broaden the sport's understanding of child abuse and neglect"
5. "Encourage and promote athlete empowerment and participation"
6. "Provide a formal acknowledgement and apology to all members of the gymnastics community in Australia who have experienced any form of abuse in the sport"
7. "Develop a skills-based training and support program for all athletes to prevent and address eating disorders and disordered eating"
8. "Develop and refine resources relating to body image, weight management practices and eating disorders, to improve consistency and support effective implementation"
9. "All matters regarding child abuse and neglect, misconduct, bullying, sexual harassment, and assault be investigated externally of the sport"
10. "Establish interim and ongoing oversight over relevant complaints at all levels of the sport"
11. "Establish a toll-free triage, referral and reporting telephone service operated by SIA"
12. "Align current governance with Sport Australia's Sport Governance Principles more consistently and effectively"

Throughout the review, AHRC recommended athletes utilise Sport Integrity Australia (SIA) as the appropriate independent body for abuse allegations. In total, SIA received 35 abuse allegations as a result, however only 7 of these allegations proceeded to investigations that were ongoing after the report was released.

As part of their response to the report, Sport Integrity Australia introduced the National Integrity Framework to apply to all sports in Australia in March 2021. This framework included an independent complaints handling model, with SIA encouraging all sports to adopt this model to ensure the independent and transparent handling of complaints moving forward within Australian sport.

By the end of 2022, the National Integrity Framework and its policies had been adopted by 81 recognised National Sporting Organisations in Australia, with the adoption of the Framework and its policies being a requirement for any sporting organisation applying to be recognised as the governing body within Australia to the Australian Sports Commission.

However the introduction of the National Integrity Framework and its complaint policy saw controversy due to a conflict of interest held by the SIA/NST CEO, John Boultbee. John Boultbee was the director of the AIS from 1995 to 2001, overseeing a wide range of sports under the AIS banner including gymnastics. This led to the potential for a conflict of interest for any complaints regarding Boultbee's time at the AIS, which Boultbee himself acknowledged. However, Boultbee stated that in the event there were any matters that related to his time at the AIS, he would recuse himself from any role in the complaint.

Further concerns were raised in 2022 about the independent nature of this mechanism, as Kitty Chiller stepped down from her role at Gymnastics Australia as CEO to become deputy chief executive of the NST. When concerns were raised, NST confirmed that Kitty Chiller would have no involvement in any gymnastics matter that came before the tribunal.

The AHRC report highlights that abuse was occurring within the AGF/AIS gymnastics program as early as the early 1980s shortly after the program was established. As a result of this ASC issued an apology statement to AIS athletes, setting up an independent and confidential support service available to any former AIS athletes and staff to link with support services, in line with the report's 6th recommendation. The AIS also launched a restoration payment scheme, offering payments ranging from $5000 to $50,000 to athletes who suffered abuse during their time as scholarship holders between 1981 and 2013, as well as counselling and support services and engagement with senior representatives from both ASC and AIS.

Gymnastics Australia released an apology in the aftermath of the report's release also, stating Gymnastics Australia "unreservedly apologises to all athletes and family members who have experienced any form of abuse participating in the sport" as well as announcing their intention to adopt all 12 recommendations as overseen by their newly formed integrity committee.

While the investigation had been actively underway in late 2020, Gymnastics Australia stated in their annual report that they had formally commenced the on-boarding process of signing up for the National Redress Scheme. This scheme was designed to assist people who had experienced institutional child sexual abuse to gain access to counselling, a personal response and a redress payment. By November 2022, Gymnastics Australia was yet to formally join the scheme, with gymnasts speaking out about this being yet another broken promise by Gymnastics Australia. In a May 2023 submission to the Joint Standing Committee on Implementation of the National Redress Scheme, Gymnastics Australia CEO Alexandra Ash confirmed that the governing body was in a financial position that prevented it from being accepted by the scheme. Gymnastics Australia finally formally joined the scheme in August 2023, more than two years after it began the process.

=== Sport Integrity Australia Investigations and GA Restorative Engagement Program - 2021 - 2022 ===
As part of the AHRC investigation, AHRC recommended Sport Integrity Australia as the appropriate independent body to report abuse allegations within Australian sport. At the conclusion of the AHRC investigation, SIA received 35 abuse allegation complaints, however only deemed 7 as worthy of an ongoing investigation after the report's release.

Of these seven complaints, four were then returned with a finding of "neither substantiated or unsubstantiated", with the findings letter reminding complainants to maintain confidentiality. The families stated that they felt the process had let them down with their complaints not being properly heard or judged.

Gymnastics Australia took further action in 2022, launching its Restorative Engagement Program. This program aimed to provide a platform for both individuals and groups to formally convey their personal experiences that would then be used to inform changes to procedures, guidelines and behaviours within Gymnastics Australia control.

All athletes and their families who had made a formal complaint to SIA in 2020 were invited to take part in the Restorative Engagement Program on a voluntary basis.

As part of participation in this program, Gymnastics Australia asked these participants to sign a non-disclosure agreement, leading to condemnation by the athletes and their families as Gymnastics Australia was trying to gag their voices while not yet publicly acknowledging any of the abuse complaints that had been handled by SIA since the AHRC report release.

=== Western Australian Institute of Sport (WAIS) investigation - 2021 - 2022 ===
As part of the larger 2020 AHRC investigation into gymnastics within Australia, a group of 20 former gymnasts from the Western Australian Institute of Sport (WAIS) signed a joint submission regarding the physical, emotional and psychological abuse they had experienced as part of the WAIS gymnastics training culture.

These 20 gymnasts then took part in an ABC News investigation regarding the WAIS specific abuse, leading to WAIS to self-refer these allegations to Sport Integrity Australia for further investigation in April 2021.

In early May 2021, WAIS board chair Neil McLean released an apology statement in response to the AHRC's "Changing the Rourtine" report, stating:

"On behalf of the WAIS board and management we offer our sincere apologies to any person who has experienced distress or injury associated with their participation in the WAIS gymnastics program."

— Neil McLean, Western Australian Institute of Sport Board Chair

Former WAIS gymnasts publicly criticised this apology, stating that it was weak, tokenistic, disingenuous and downplayed their experiences of abuse while training at WAIS.

In June 2021, Sport Integrity Australia confirmed that they would be independently investigating the abuse allegations from the WAIS gymnasts, with a goal to understand the culture of the WAIS program during its operation duration from 1987 to 2016, examining the athletes' experience of abuse and harm along with the effectiveness of the institute's current child safety policies and procedures. All athletes, parents, staff, coaches and personnel who had been a part of the WAIS Women's Artistic Gymnastics program were invited to make submissions.

To avoid any conflict of interest, WAIS Chief Executive Steve Lawrence removed himself from any involvement in the review.

The investigation included interviews and written submissions from a total of 92 participants, with 15,000 pages of documentation being examined. The final report was handed down in April 2022.

The final report found that "it was reasonably likely that some gymnasts suffered abuse and/or harm while participating in the Program at WAIS. This includes things such as verbal and physical abuse, unnecessary skinfold testing, weight-shaming, the expectation to train and compete with injuries, and extreme training loads. The Review also found that the policies and procedures that governed the Program did not adequately protect some of the gymnasts."

As a result of this finding, four recommendations were made in the report:

1. "On the grounds that there was no effective complaint process for gymnasts to raise concerns, Sport Integrity Australia recommended that WAIS adopt the National Integrity Framework and the associated independent complaint handling process.
2. On the basis that some of the practices were inappropriate for children, Sport Integrity Australia recommended that WAIS ensure that all sports programs involving children are child-focused and age-appropriate.
3. In recognition of the importance of athlete welfare and the risk of potential long-term harm to athletes, Sport Integrity Australia recommended that WAIS continue to embed athlete well-being into policies, procedures and practices in all sport programs.
4. In recognition of the harm and/or abuse reasonably likely to have been suffered by some gymnasts, Sport Integrity Australia recommended that WAIS, in collaboration with the impacted gymnasts, engage in a restorative and reconciliatory process."

In response to the recommendations, former WAIS gymnasts stated that the recommendation that they simply receive an apology did not go far enough, calling on the state government as well as national sporting peak bodies to hold those who were responsible accountable with further consequences. The Gymnast Alliance Australia also released a statement responding to the report, criticising that WAIS had downplayed the allegations as being historical when they had happened as recently as six years before the release of the report. The Gymnast Alliance Australia called on the Western Australian Government as well as Gymnastics Australia to hold independent investigations into those responsible in order to hold them accountable and avoid further harm to athletes in the future.

WAIS made an additional public policy after the WAIS report was released, stating "We are sorry that your experiences were painful rather than enjoyable and we apologise that elements of the WAIS program failed you. To those who experienced abuse and harm we apologise. Sport, elite sport included, is meant to be a healthy and enjoyable experience. We are sorry that this was not your experience."

This apology was critiqued upon its release for the inclusion of the statement "Can we also note that SIA referred a number of allegations of sexual abuse and/or physical abuse to the relevant authorities who had the jurisdiction to investigate these allegation but none of these allegations progressed to investigation or charges and all have been closed".

The Western Australian government issued a formal apology to WAIS gymnasts in June 2022, with Sport and Recreation Minister David Templeman directing the department to undertake a comprehensive governance and culture review of WAIS and the formation of a Specialist Child Safeguarding Unit for sport. They also announced that the Department would oversee and audit the implementation and compliance with the recommendations within the SIA report by WAIS.

In May 2023, WAIS acknowledge their April 2022 apology fell short and released a second apology as they prepared to participate in a reconciliatory and restorative process. At that time, the WAIS board also released a public commitment that included details on how they would act in the best interests of athlete health, wellbeing and safety.

=== Northern Districts Gymnastics Club controversy - 2021- 2022 ===
As part of the ongoing SCMP investigations, Sport Integrity Australia referred an investigation to the Western Australian police, which resulted in detectives laying charges in March 2021 regarding incidents involving a former gymnastics coach between February 2019 and December 2020 as part of his coaching work at the Northern Districts Gymnastics Club. The Office of the Director of Public Prosecutions discontinued these charges in June 2022.

The Northern Districts Gymnastics Club came under fire during the course of the investigation for their handling of the case, not informing parents of the allegations or charges, with the club defending this decision when a parent found out, removed their child and spoke out to the media.

The club stated that when they became aware of the allegations, the club sought legal advice from authorities, standing the coach down with full pay before later terminating his employment. The parent stated that they felt the club should have informed the parents about the allegations and charges and that the club was working with police, providing parents information about how to broach the subject to ensure that nothing had happened to their child for safeguarding purposes.

=== Peggy Liddick Investigations and Sanctions - 2022 ===
Peggy Liddick acted as the Australian women's artistic gymnastics team coach and boss between 1997 and 2016. In early 2022, the National Sports Tribunal found Liddick guilty of harassing two-time olympian gymnast, Georgia Bonora.

Liddick denied all allegations of bullying and emotional abuse, however Bondora's complaint was supported by her former Australian teammates, Shona Morgan, Olivia Vivian, Chloe Gilliland and Ashleigh Brennan.

The complaint, alleging misconduct, bullying and abuse between 2006 and 2012, was initially lodged with Gymnastics Australia in 2020, before they forwarded it to Sport Integrity Australia in September 2020.

Upon review, SIA upheld five allegations that were made against Liddick, with an appeal application to see the matter heard by the NST dismissing three allegations while upholding two.

As an outcome of the NST hearing, Liddick was given a 4 month suspension which was suspended for 2 years and ordered to write an apology letter to Bondora which stated:

"Dear Georgia,

Pursuant to Order 5 of the National Sports Tribunal Determination dated 18 January 2022, as directed by the Tribunal, I apologise to you and acknowledge that I engaged in unacceptable coaching behaviours, in particular the use of negative language which was belittling, offensive and humiliating and cause great upset to you.

Kind regards

Peggy Liddick"

— Peggy Liddick, Apology to Georgia Bonora

== See also ==
- Australia women's national gymnastics team
