= Gymnastics at the 2006 Commonwealth Games =

- Venue: Rod Laver Arena
- Location: Melbourne, Australia
- Dates: 15 to 26 March 2006

Gymnastics at the 2006 Commonwealth Games was the sixth appearance of Gymnastics at the Commonwealth Games. The events were held in Melbourne, Australia, from 15 to 26 March 2006.

The gymnastics events were held at the Rod Laver Arena.

Canada topped the gymnastics medal table by virtue of winning 12 gold medals across the artistic and rhythmic competitions.

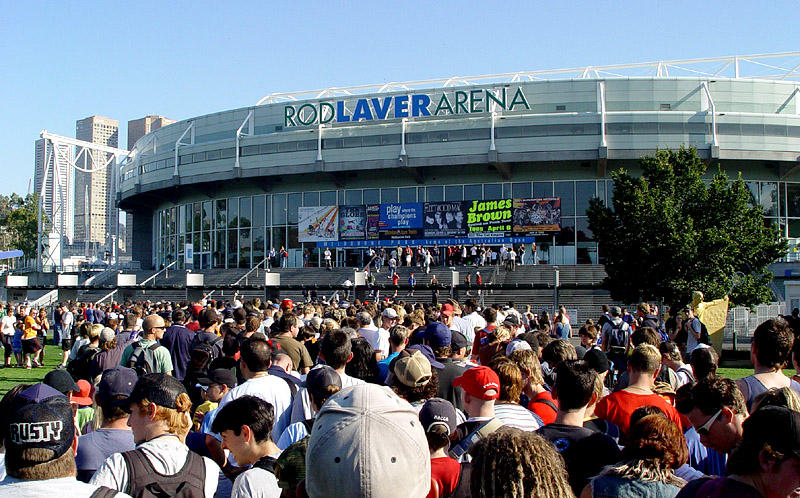
Rod Laver Arena in 2005

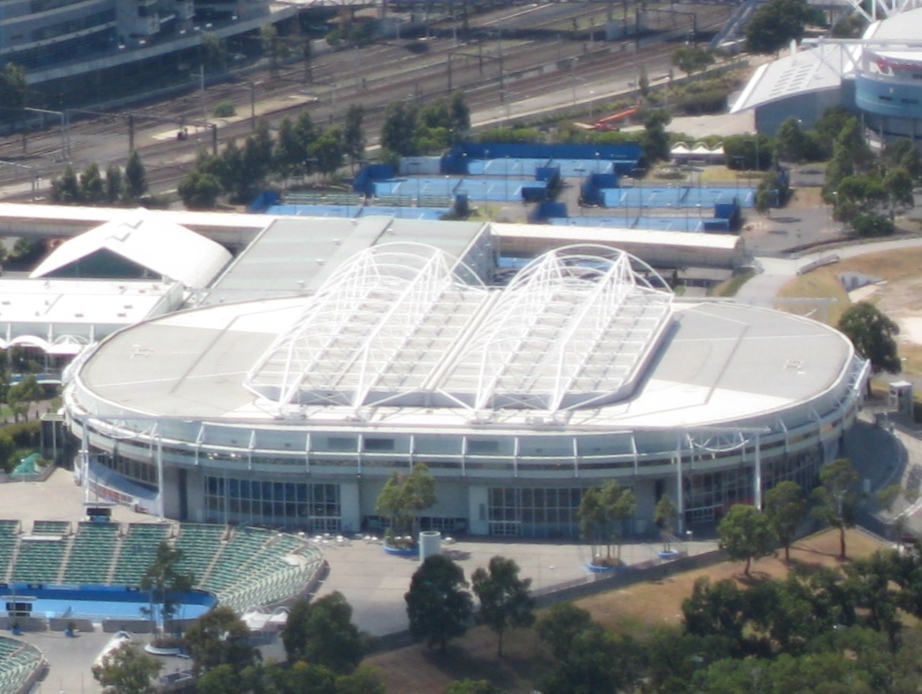
Aerial view

== Medal table ==
=== Artistic gymnastics ===
* Host nation (Australia)

Rank	Nation	Gold	Silver	Bronze	Total
1	Australia*	6	6	6	18
2	Canada	6	4	3	13
3	England	2	2	2	6
4	Malaysia	0	1	0	1
4	Wales	0	1	0	1
6	Cyprus	0	0	1	1
6	Scotland	0	0	1	1
6	South Africa	0	0	1	1
Totals (8 entries)		14	14	14	42

=== Rhythmic gymnastics ===
* Host nation (Australia)

Rank	Nation	Gold	Silver	Bronze	Total
1	Canada	6	1	2	9
2	Malaysia	0	4	2	6
3	Australia*	0	1	2	3
Totals (3 entries)		6	6	6	18

== Medal Summary ==
=== Artistic ===
Men's Events

Event	Gold	Silver	Bronze
Team all-around	Canada; Nathan Gafuik; Grant Golding; David Kikuchi; Kyle Shewfelt; Adam Wong	Australia; Damian Istria; Joshua Jefferis; Samuel Offord; Philippe Rizzo; Prashanth Sellathurai	England; Ryan Bradley; Ross Brewer; Luke Folwell; Louis Smith; Kristian Thomas
Individual all-around	Joshua Jefferis; Australia	Nathan Gafuik; Canada	Philippe Rizzo; Australia
Floor	Adam Wong; Canada	Shu Wai Ng; Malaysia	Kyle Shewfelt; Canada
Pommel horse	Louis Smith; England	Prashanth Sellathurai; Australia	Grant Golding; Canada
Rings	Joshua Jefferis; Australia	Damian Istria; Australia	Herodotos Giorgallas; Cyprus
Vault	Kyle Shewfelt; Canada	Nathan Gafuik; Canada	Samuel Offord; Australia
Parallel bars	Grant Golding; Canada	Philippe Rizzo; Australia	Joshua Jefferis; Australia
Horizontal bar	Damian Istria; Australia	David Eaton; Wales	Adam Cox; Scotland

Women's Events

Event	Gold	Silver	Bronze
Team all-around	Australia; Ashleigh Brennan; Hollie Dykes; Naomi Russell; Monette Russo; Chloe Sims	England; Imogen Cairns; Shavahn Church; Hannah Clowes; Becky Downie	Canada; Alyssa Brown; Brittnee Habbib; Elyse Hopfner-Hibbs; Jenna Kerbis; Gael Mackie
Individual all-around	Chloe Sims; Australia	Elyse Hopfner-Hibbs; Canada	Hollie Dykes; Australia
Vault	Imogen Cairns; England	Alyssa Brown; Canada	Naomi Russell; Australia
Uneven bars	Elyse Hopfner-Hibbs; Canada	Shavahn Church; England	Monette Russo; Australia
Balance beam	Elyse Hopfner-Hibbs; Canada	Hollie Dykes; Australia	Becky Downie; England
Floor	Hollie Dykes; Australia	Ashleigh Brennan; Australia	Francki van Rooyen; South Africa

== Results ==
=== Men's artistic gymnastics ===
==== Team competition ====
Pos.	Nation	Name	Floor	Pommel Horse	Rings	Vault	Parallel Bars	High Bar	Total
1	Canada	Nathan Gafuik	14.600	13.950	14.350	16.200	14.500	14.700	88.300
1	Canada	Grant Golding	14.950	14.350	15.150	16.100	15.200		75.750
1	Canada	David Kikuchi		14.200	14.700		14.500	14.500	57.900
1	Canada	Kyle Shewfelt	15.500			16.600		14.700	46.800
1	Canada	Adam Wong	15.200	13.400	14.750	16.100	14.500	14.500	88.450
1	Canada	Total (rank)	45.650 (1)	42.500 (2)	44.600 (2)	48.900 (1)	44.200 (1)	43.900 (1)	269.750
2	Australia	Damian Istria	14.400		15.350	15.600		14.450	59.800
2	Australia	Joshua Jefferis	14.900	13.850	15.850	16.100	14.800	14.500	90.000
2	Australia	Samuel Offord	14.550	12.750		16.200	13.100	14.650	71.250
2	Australia	Philippe Rizzo	13.250	14.350	14.700	15.800	15.150	12.800	86.050
2	Australia	Prashanth Sellathurai		15.350	14.600		13.900		43.850
2	Australia	Total (rank)	43.850 (2)	43.550 (1)	45.900 (1)	48.100 (2)	43.850 (2)	43.600 (2)	268.850
3	England	Ryan Bradley	15.000	12.950	14.150	15.750	14.200	14.250	86.300
3	England	Ross Brewer	14.200	14.100	14.750	15.600	14.950	14.350	87.950
3	England	Luke Folwell			13.300	15.700			29.000
3	England	Louis Smith	13.850	14.800			13.650	13.300	55.600
3	England	Kristian Thomas	13.750	13.350	13.250	16.000	13.350	13.650	83.350
3	England	Total (rank)	43.050 (3)	42.250 (3)	42.200 (3)	47.450 (4)	42.800 (3)	42.250 (4)	260.000
4	Scotland	Adam Cox	14.200	13.550	13.700	15.800	14.450	14.550	86.250
4	Scotland	Steve Frew			14.600	15.600	13.100	12.700	56.000
4	Scotland	Daniel Keatings	14.100	12.450	13.500	15.600	14.000	13.850	83.500
4	Scotland	Barry Koursarys	13.750	12.600		15.550			41.900
4	Scotland	Andrew Mackie	13.200	14.100	12.800		13.100	13.400	66.600
4	Scotland	Total (rank)	42.050 (4)	40.250 (5)	41.800 (4)	47.000 (6)	41.550 (4)	41.800 (5)	254.450
5	Malaysia	Shu Mun Ng	13.650		13.250	15.750	13.500	14.100	70.250
5	Malaysia	Shu Wai Ng	14.700	14.100	13.200	16.100	13.750	14.600	86.450
5	Malaysia	Kwang Tung Onn		12.450				13.050	25.500
5	Malaysia	Wei Siang Ooi	13.700	13.200	13.050	16.200	12.750	14.100	83.000
5	Malaysia	Kiam Bun Yap	13.400	13.300	12.650	15.600	13.100		68.050
5	Malaysia	Total (rank)	42.050 (4)	40.600 (4)	39.500 (6)	48.050 (3)	40.350 (5)	42.800 (3)	253.350
6	South Africa	Cristian Brezeanu	12.750	11.950	13.400	15.700	11.900	12.550	78.250
6	South Africa	Steven Barry Friedman	13.600	12.000	14.400	15.500	12.900	13.450	81.850
6	South Africa	Troy Sender	12.650	13.600	13.200	15.300	13.350	13.000	81.100
6	South Africa	Gerhard Swiegers	13.000	10.450	13.600	16.000	13.300	13.500	79.850
6	South Africa	Total (rank)	39.350 (8)	37.550 (7)	41.400 (5)	47.200 (5)	39.550 (8)	39.950 (6)	245.000
7	India	Sharat Chandra		11.400		15.800	13.050	12.550	52.800
7	India	Rohit Jaiswal	12.650	12.400	12.000	14.700	13.200	13.450	78.400
7	India	Ashish Kumar	13.350	13.550	12.750	15.150	13.400	11.850	80.050
7	India	Vivek Mishra	13.350		10.400				23.750
7	India	Mayank Srivastava	13.250	12.900	12.150	16.000	12.550	12.000	78.850
7	India	Total (rank)	39.950 (7)	38.850 (6)	36.900 (8)	46.950 (7)	39.650 (7)	38.000 (8)	240.300
8	New Zealand	Daniel Good	13.000	10.400	13.700	15.650	12.800	13.350	78.900
8	New Zealand	Mark Holyoake	13.950	12.500	13.250	15.950	14.450	12.850	82.950
8	New Zealand	Misha Koudinov	13.850	12.100	11.350	14.950	13.000	12.300	77.550
8	New Zealand	Patrick Peng		9.600	11.600	15.000	12.250	10.200	58.650
8	New Zealand	Total (rank)	40.800 (6)	35.000 (8)	38.550 (7)	46.600 (8)	40.250 (6)	38.500 (7)	239.700
9	Sri Lanka	Eranga A. Dias Gunasekara	10.500	9.850	10.000	15.150	12.550	10.700	68.750
9	Sri Lanka	P. Ekanayake Mudiyanselage	12.450	10.000	11.450	14.900	13.350	11.700	73.850
9	Sri Lanka	Eranda N. Dias Gunasekara	13.400	8.850	10.350	14.600	13.000	10.600	70.800
9	Sri Lanka	Total (rank)	36.350 (9)	28.700 (9)	31.800 (9)	44.650 (9)	38.900 (9)	33.000 (9)	213.400

==== All-around ====
Rank	Gymnast	Country	Point
Gold medal	Joshua Jefferis	Australia	89.450
Silver medal	Nathan Gafuik	Canada	88.350
Bronze medal	Philippe Rizzo	Australia	88.200

==== Floor exercise ====
Rank	Gymnast	Country	Point
Gold medal	Adam Alexander Wong	Canada	14.975
Silver medal	Shu Wai Ng	Malaysia	14.85
Bronze medal	Kyle Shewfelt	Canada	14.7
4	Ross Brewer	England	14.475
5	Samuel Offord	Australia	14.325
6	Ryan Bradley	England	14.300
7	Joshua Jefferis	Australia	14.300
8	Constantinos Aristotelous	Cyprus	13.750

==== Pommel horse ====
Rank	Gymnast	Country	Point
Gold medal	Louis Smith	England	15.775
Silver medal	Prashanth Sellathurai	Australia	15.600
Bronze medal	Grant Golding	Canada	14.875
4	David Kikuchi	Canada	14.525
5	Ross Brewer	England	13.675
6	Andrew Mackie	Scotland	13.250
7	Shu Wai Ng	Malaysia	12.950
8	Philippe Rizzo	Australia	12.875

==== Still rings ====
Rank	Gymnast	Country	Point
Gold medal	Joshua Jefferis	Australia	15.875
Silver medal	Damian Istria	Australia	15.7
Bronze medal	Irodotos Georgallas	Cyprus	15.3

==== Vault ====
Rank	Gymnast	Country	Point
Gold medal	Kyle Shewfelt	Canada	16.337
Silver medal	Nathan Gafuik	Canada	16.112
Bronze medal	Samuel Offord	Australia	15.862

==== Parallel bars ====
Rank	Gymnast	Country	Point
Gold medal	Grant Golding	Canada	15.450
Silver medal	Philippe Rizzo	Australia	15.275
Bronze medal	Joshua Jefferis	Australia	14.800

==== High bar ====
Rank	Gymnast	Country	Point
Gold medal	Damian Istria	Australia	15.600
Silver medal	David Eaton	Wales	15.000
Bronze medal	Adam Cox	Scotland	14.950

=== Women's artistic gymnastics ===
==== Team competition ====
Pos.	Nation	Name	Vault	Bars	Beam	Floor	Total
1	Australia	Ashleigh Brennan			14.150	14.050	28.200
1	Australia	Hollie Dykes	14.800	14.250	15.500	14.000	58.550
1	Australia	Naomi Russell	14.400	14.350			28.750
1	Australia	Monette Russo	14.250	14.800	14.550	13.500	57.100
1	Australia	Chloe Sims	14.050	13.200	13.950	11.850	53.050
1	Australia	Total (rank)	43.450 (1)	43.400 (1)	44.200 (1)	41.550 (1)	172.600
2	England	Imogen Cairns	14.500	13.350	13.100	13.850	54.800
2	England	Shavahn Church	13.600	14.700	13.200	12.850	54.350
2	England	Hannah Clowes	13.800	13.600	12.900	13.350	53.650
2	England	Becky Downie	13.900	14.050	13.450	12.700	54.100
2	England	Total (rank)	42.200 (3)	42.350 (2)	39.750 (3)	40.050 (2)	164.350
3	Canada	Alyssa Brown	14.500	12.600	13.450	13.300	53.850
3	Canada	Brittnee Habbib		12.200	12.500		24.700
3	Canada	Elyse Hopfner-Hibbs	14.100	14.900	14.100	13.550	56.650
3	Canada	Jenna Kerbis	13.700			12.750	26.450
3	Canada	Gael Mackie	13.500	13.100	12.150	12.200	50.950
3	Canada	Total (rank)	42.300 (2)	40.600 (3)	40.050 (2)	39.600 (4)	162.550
4	Wales	Samantha Bailey	14.000		12.700	12.450	39.150
4	Wales	Jessica Gazzi	13.950	0.000		12.850	26.800
4	Wales	Lynette Lisle	13.400	13.250	13.000	12.750	52.400
4	Wales	Rhian Pugh		13.650	10.800		24.450
4	Wales	Melanie Roberts	13.450	13.200	12.800	13.150	52.600
4	Wales	Total (rank)	41.400 (4)	40.100 (4)	38.500 (6)	38.750 (6)	158.750
5	Scotland	Carol Galashan	13.550	12.250	11.850	12.150	49.800
5	Scotland	Helen Galashan		12.700	13.600		26.300
5	Scotland	Jenny Hannah	13.550			13.300	26.850
5	Scotland	Rosalie Hutton	12.900	12.050	13.450	13.450	51.850
5	Scotland	Emma White	13.400	12.700	12.350	12.150	50.600
5	Scotland	Total (rank)	40.500 (5t)	37.650 (6)	39.400 (5)	38.900 (5)	156.450
6	South Africa	Candice Cronje	13.400	12.150	13.100	11.150	49.800
6	South Africa	Chanel Moonsammy	13.100	11.550	12.650	13.150	50.450
6	South Africa	Francki van Rooyen	13.400	11.850	13.750	13.400	52.400
6	South Africa	Rinette Whelpton	13.350	10.350	12.100	13.250	49.050
6	South Africa	Total (rank)	40.150 (7)	35.550 (7)	39.500 (4)	39.800 (3)	155.000
7	New Zealand	Alice Barnett	13.450	12.900		11.850	38.200
7	New Zealand	Belinda Castles	13.800	13.250	11.550	11.250	49.850
7	New Zealand	Georgia Cervin	13.200	12.400	12.550		38.150
7	New Zealand	Olivia Jobsis	13.250	12.700	13.100	11.300	50.350
7	New Zealand	Sarah Miller			12.150		12.150
7	New Zealand	Total (rank)	40.500 (5t)	38.850 (5)	37.800 (7)	34.400 (8)	151.550
8	Malaysia	Nurul Fatiha Abd Hamid	12.750	12.000	11.950	12.650	49.350
8	Malaysia	Nabihah Binti Ali	12.500	10.000	12.250	11.750	46.500
8	Malaysia	Kai Ling Tan	12.400	10.050	11.450	12.200	46.100
8	Malaysia	Total (rank)	37.650 (9)	32.050 (8)	35.650 (8)	36.600 (7)	141.950
9	Bermuda	Kalena Astwood	11.400	9.300	11.350	11.300	43.350
9	Bermuda	Kaisey Griffith	11.850	10.350	10.400	11.200	43.800
9	Bermuda	Hannah King	12.550	7.800	10.400		30.750
9	Bermuda	Casey Lopes				10.750	10.750
9	Bermuda	Caitlyn Mello	12.550	10.600	12.350	11.150	46.650
9	Bermuda	Total (rank)	36.950 (10)	30.250 (9)	34.100 (9)	33.650 (9)	134.950
10	India	Jhunuk Basu	12.900	8.400	12.050	9.900	43.250
10	India	Priti Das			11.400		11.400
10	India	Rakhi Debnath	12.200	7.700	7.700	9.050	36.650
10	India	Tumpa Debnath	12.950	9.950		10.600	33.500
10	India	P Meenakshi	12.000	9.250	9.700	10.100	41.050
10	India	Total (rank)	38.050 (8)	27.600 (10)	33.150 (10)	30.600 (10)	129.400

==== All-around ====
Rank	Gymnast	Country	Point
Gold medal	Chloe Sims	Australia	57.100
Silver medal	Elyse Hopfner-Hibbs	Canada	57.100
Bronze medal	Hollie Dykes	Australia	55.800

==== Vault ====
Rank	Gymnast	Country	Point
Gold medal	Imogen Cairns	England	14.325
Silver medal	Alyssa Brown	Canada	14.275
Bronze medal	Naomi Russell	Australia	14.137

==== Uneven bars ====
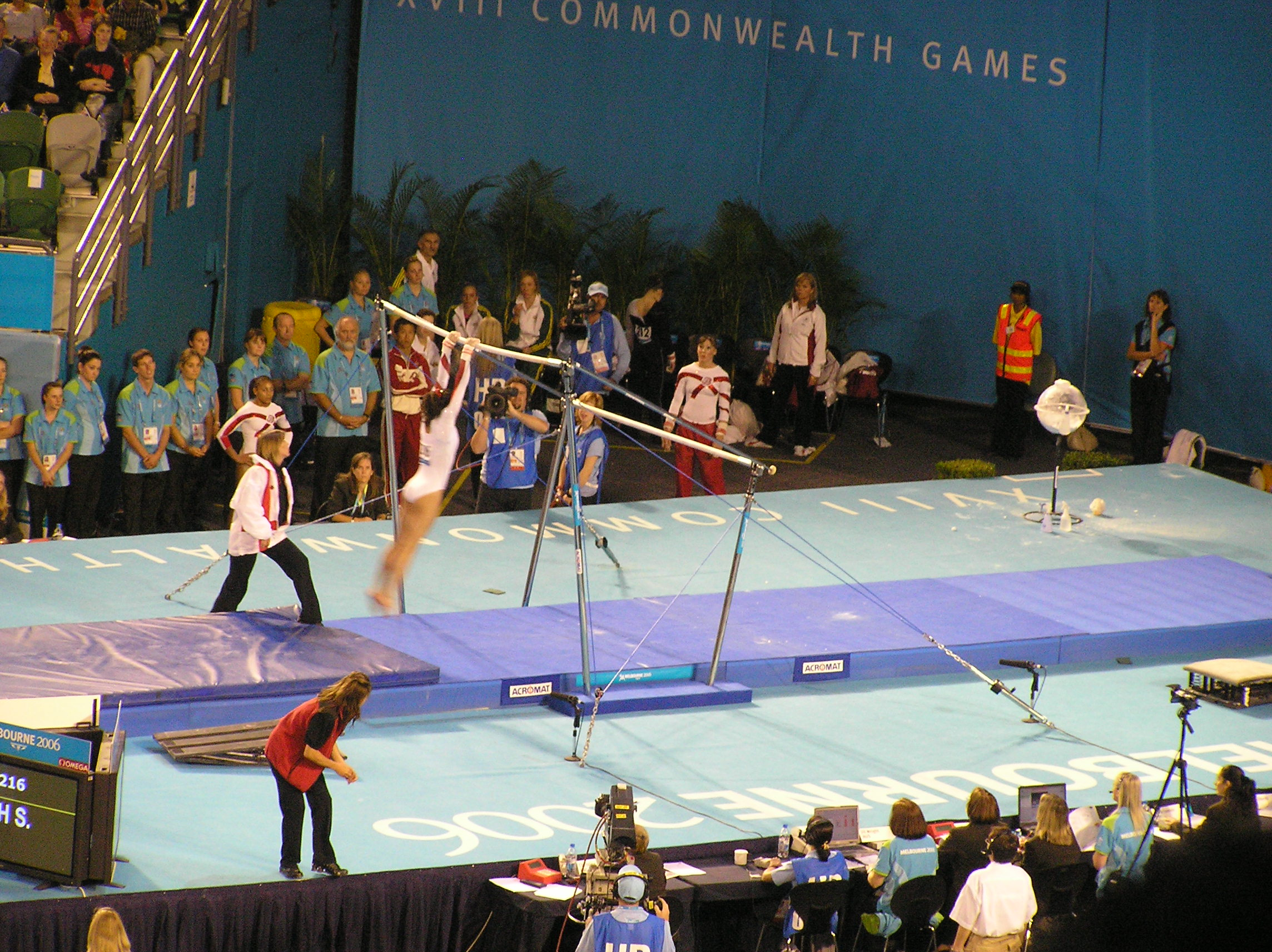
The uneven bars competition in progress

Rank	Gymnast	Country	Point
Gold medal	Elyse Hopfner-Hibbs	Canada	15.1
Silver medal	Shavahn Church	England	14.875
Bronze medal	Monette Russo	Australia	14.85

==== Balance beam ====
Rank	Gymnast	Country	Point
Gold medal	Elyse Hopfner-Hibbs	Canada	14.950
Silver medal	Hollie Dykes	Australia	14.925
Bronze medal	Becky Downie	England	14.075

==== Floor exercise ====
Rank	Gymnast	Country	Point
Gold medal	Hollie Dykes	Australia	14.650
Silver medal	Ashleigh Brennan	Australia	13.925
Bronze medal	Francki van Rooyen	South Africa	13.900

=== Rhythmic gymnastics ===
==== Team competition ====
Pos.	Nation	Name	Rope	Ball	Clubs	Ribbon	Total
1	Canada	Carly Orava	11.950	11.925	12.725	10.750	
1	Canada	Alexandra Michel Orlando	13.775	13.875	13.725	12.950	
1	Canada	Yana Tsikaridze	12.600	12.700	12.425	12.050	
1	Canada	Total	38.325	38.500	38.875	35.750	128.775
2	Malaysia	Seow Ting Foong	11.675	11.775	13.000	10.975	
2	Malaysia	Wen Chean Lim	12.050	12.650	12.600	11.975	
2	Malaysia	Durratun Nashihin Rosli	13.075	12.075	13.300	11.100	
2	Malaysia	Total	36.800	36.500	38.900	34.050	124.175
3	Australia	Naazmi Johnston	11.700	12.675	12.150	11.275	
3	Australia	Amanda Lee See	9.350	10.150	10.900	9.600	
3	Australia	Kimberly Mason	11.950	12.625	13.075	10.675	
3	Australia	Total	33.000	35.450	36.125	31.550	117.175
4	England	Hannah Chappell	10.325	10.825	11.275	10.850	
4	England	Rachel Ennis	9.600	10.500	10.925	10.000	
4	England	Heather Mann	10.225	11.625	11.425	10.425	
4	England	Total	30.150	32.950	33.625	31.275	108.400
5	South Africa	Shalene Arnold	9.800	11.025	9.800	9.975	
5	South Africa	Odette Richard	10.775	11.675	9.900	11.150	
5	South Africa	Stephanie Sandler	9.025	11.625	10.350	9.450	
5	South Africa	Total	29.600	34.325	30.050	30.575	106.075
6	Cyprus	Loukia Trikomiti	8.675	10.600	9.425	9.700	
6	Cyprus	Chrysovalanti Dimitriou	8.775	11.500	8.700	9.000	
6	Cyprus	Raissa Panagiotou	12.050	12.150	9.475	11.475	
6	Cyprus	Total	29.500	34.250	27.600	30.175	104.150
7	India	Komal Nahar	5.125	5.900	4.900	5.950	
7	India	Surekha Rana	4.900	5.900	5.075	5.375	
7	India	Rajni Sharma	4.850	5.850	4.775	5.750	
7	India	Total	14.875	17.650	14.750	17.075	54.725

==== All-around ====
Rank	Gymnast	Country	Point
Gold medal	Alexandra Michel Orlando	Canada	54.625
Silver medal	Durratun Nashihin Rosli	Malaysia	50.825
Bronze medal	Yana Tsikaridze	Canada	49.575
4	Naazmi Johnston	Australia	48.700
5	Kimberly Mason	Australia	48.600
6	Raissa Panagiotou	Cyprus	46.275
7	Wen Chean Lim	Malaysia	46.225
8	Hannah Chappell	England	45.050
9	Heather Mann	England	44.750
10	Odette Petra-Lee Richard	South Africa	43.675
11	Shalene Gwenneth Arnold	South Africa	41.400
12	Francesca Jones	Wales	40.875
13	Teegan Metcalfe	New Zealand	39.875
14	Melissa Logan	New Zealand	38.625
15	Loukia Trikomiti	Cyprus	37.325
16	Kara Hare	Northern Ireland	27.900

==== Rope ====
Rank	Gymnast	Country	Point
Gold medal	Alexandra Michel Orlando	Canada	13.575
Silver medal	Durratun Nashihin Rosli	Malaysia	13.250
Bronze medal	Yana Tsikaridze	Canada	12.500

==== Ball ====
Rank	Gymnast	Country	Point
Gold medal	Alexandra Michel Orlando	Canada	14.850
Silver medal	Kimberly Mason	Australia	13.875
Bronze medal	Wen Chean Lim	Malaysia	13.225

==== Clubs ====
Rank	Gymnast	Country	Point
Gold medal	Alexandra Michel Orlando	Canada	14.200
Silver medal	Durratun Nashihin Rosli	Malaysia	13.475
Bronze medal	Kimberly Mason	Australia	12.825

==== Ribbon ====
Rank	Gymnast	Country	Point
Gold medal	Alexandra Michel Orlando	Canada	13.775
Silver medal	Yana Tsikaridze	Canada	12.500
Bronze medal	Wen Chean Lim	Malaysia	12.350
