= Chloe Gilliland =

Australian artistic gymnast

- Full name: Chloe Leigh Gilliland
- Born: 25 August 1990 (age 36) Toowoomba
- Height: 1.56 m (5 ft 1 in)

Gymnastics career
- Discipline: Women's artistic gymnastics
- Country represented: Australia
- Club: Q.L.I.S (Queensland institute of sport)
Medal record
Representing Australia
Commonwealth Games
Gold medal – first place	2006 Melbourne	Team
Gold medal – first place	2006 Melbourne	All-Around

Chloe Leigh Gilliland (née Sims) (born 25 August 1990 in Toowoomba, Queensland, Australia) is an Australian gymnast. She finished first all-around at the 2005 Australian junior championships, and first all-around at the 2006 Commonwealth Games in Melbourne. She was a member of Australia's 11th-place team at the 2007 World Championships in Stuttgart, where the team qualified for the 2008 Olympic Games by virtue of its top-12 finish. Sims subsequently withdrew from the Australian national team and did not try out for a spot on Australia's Olympic team.

Sims trains at the Moreton Bay College centre of excellence. She is a national team member and double Commonwealth champion. In 2020, she was one of several former gymnasts to speak out about a "toxic" culture within the country's elite programme.

== Career ==
Sims made her senior international debut as a member of the Australia Gymnastics Artistic Women's Team at the 2006 Commonwealth Games in Melbourne. There, the Australian team comfortably retained their title after the English challenge melted away following injury and withdrawal from reigning bars champion Beth Tweddle. Sims, however, was not at her best in the team competition. She fell five times but managed to qualify for the all-around final and also the vault final.

In the all-around, however, she redeemed herself. With title favourites Monette Russo and Beth Tweddle injured, there was room for a new face at the top of the podium. As other top gymnasts fell, sometimes more than once, Chloe remained consistent and hit every piece of apparatus. Her more fancied top qualifying teammate Hollie Dykes fell off every piece of apparatus, and more experienced international rivals such as Shavahn Church and Gael Mackie also had problems. She watered down her difficulty on vault and floor to be certain, and it paid off. She and runner up Elyse Hopfner-Hibbs of Canada both recorded the same score, but a were separated by a tie break because Chloe's top three scores were the highest. To the delight of the crowd, just 24 hours after her disastrous showing in the team competition Sims was the Commonwealth champion. She showed grace in victory by inviting Hopfner-Hibbs onto the gold medal podium with her, perhaps recognising the narrowness of the margin.

In the vault final, despite having the most difficult vaults of all the competitors in the final, an unfortunate fall on her second vault saw her finish in fifth place.

Injuries prevented Chloe from competing further in 2006. She missed the Pacific Alliance championship because she was having dental surgery, and was too injured to be considered for the world championships in Aarhus. However, she was able to compete on the uneven bars at the Shanghai World Cup in July where she finished fourth.

Chloe returned to competition in 2007 where she competed at the French International and Cottbus Cup meets in March. In May she competed at the Australian Gymnastics Championships where she took the bronze medal in the all-around competition, silver on the vault and bronze on the uneven bars. She also competed in an International Apparatus Challenge against China where she took the gold medal.
