= Yana Tsikaridze =

Canadian rhythmic gymnast

- Born: September 22, 1987 (age 38) Tbilisi, Georgia

Gymnastics career
- Discipline: Rhythmic gymnastics
- Country represented: Canada
Medal record
Commonwealth Games
Gold medal – first place	2006 Melbourne	Team all-around
Silver medal – second place	2006 Melbourne	Ribbon
Bronze medal – third place	2006 Melbourne	Individual all-around
Bronze medal – third place	2006 Melbourne	Rope

Yana Tsikaridze (born 22 September 1987) is a Canadian retired individual rhythmic gymnast. She won four medals at the 2006 Commonwealth Games, including team gold and all-around bronze.

== Early life ==
Tsikaridze was born in Tbilisi, Georgia. Her family moved to Israel when she was 7, then moved again to Canada when she was 10.

== Career ==
Tsikaridze began gymnastics at age 4; her mother initially enrolled her older sister, who didn't enjoy the sport. Tsikaridze did, and she began taking lessons instead.

She was 4th at the novice Canadian Championships in 1999; however, as a junior, she did not make the national team. Her career began to rebound after she entered the senior age level. In 2003, she was 4th at the Canadian Championships, and in 2004 and 2005, she was 2nd.

After graduating from secondary school, Tsikaridze decided to delay continuing her education to focus on gymnastics. She competed at the 2005 Pan American Championships, where she advanced to three finals, then was selected for the 2005 World Championships, held in Baku, Azerbaijan a week after her birthday. Ahead of the Championships, Tsikaridze trained in Bulgaria. There she placed 55th.

In March 2006, Tsikaridze competed at the 2006 Commonwealth Games, where she won a gold medal in the team all-around event with her teammates, Alexandra Orlando and Carly Orava. She also won a silver medal in the ribbon event and bronze medals in the individual all-around and rope events.

After the 2006 Canadian Championships, where she won the bronze medal, Tsikaridze announced her retirement: "I felt I delivered my strongest performance ever this weekend so I'm pleased to retire at my best." She said she intended to concentrate on school and begin coaching.
