= Elyse Hopfner-Hibbs =

Canadian artistic gymnast (born 1989)

- Born: September 12, 1989 (age 37) Mississauga, Ontario
- Height: 152 cm (5 ft 0 in)

Gymnastics career
- Discipline: Women's artistic gymnastics
- Country represented: Canada
- Club: Sport Seneca
- Head coach: Carol-Angela Orchard
- Assistant coach: Brian McVey
- Choreographer: Lisa Cowan
- Music: Malagueña by Brian Setzer
- Eponymous skills: Floor Exercise
Medal record
Representing Canada
World Championships
Bronze medal – third place	2006 Aarhus	Balance Beam
Commonwealth Games
Gold medal – first place	2006 Melbourne	Uneven Bars
Gold medal – first place	2006 Melbourne	Balance Beam
Silver medal – second place	2006 Melbourne	All-Around
Bronze medal – third place	2006 Melbourne	Team
Pacific Rim Championships
Silver medal – second place	2008 San Jose	Team
Bronze medal – third place	2006 Honolulu	Team
Bronze medal – third place	2006 Honolulu	Balance Beam
Bronze medal – third place	2006 Honolulu	Floor Exercise

Elyse Null (née Hopfner-Hibbs; born September 12, 1989) is a Canadian former gymnast, UCLA gymnastics alumna, and YouTube personality. She was born in Mississauga, Ontario.

== Career ==
Hopfner-Hibbs first started gymnastics in 1993, and competed in her first international event in 2001.

Hopfner-Hibbs won four medals at the 2006 Commonwealth Games: team bronze, gold in the women's uneven bars and women's beam, and silver in the women's all-around. She did not take the all-around title, despite having achieved the same score as eventual winner Chloe Sims of Australia. The new tie break rule had to be used to separate them (previously ties were not uncommon in gymnastics, even in the all-around). Sims did, however, invite Hopfner-Hibbs onto the gold medal podium with her. Despite this, Hopfner-Hibbs finished the championship as one of the most decorated gymnasts at the event, tying with Hollie Dykes of Australia for the highest medal total.

In the 2006 World Championships, Hopfner-Hibbs won a bronze medal on the beam, the first medal ever for a Canadian woman at the World Championships. Since then she has won six World Cup medals on the beam and the uneven bars.

Hopfner-Hibbs competed in the 2008 Olympics in Beijing. She did not qualify to any event finals due to some errors in the preliminaries, but placed 16th in the individual all-around final.

== College career ==
Hopfner-Hibbs entered UCLA on an NCAA scholarship in 2008 and was named Freshman of the Year in the Pac-10 Conference in 2009. She also finished 7th in the individual all-around competition at the 2009 NCAA National Championship, and was a second team All-American on vault, floor, uneven bars and in the all-around. In 2010, Elyse was a member of the national championship-winning UCLA team.

== Personal life ==
On May 1, 2015, Hopfner-Hibbs married Grayson Null, the younger brother of YouTube personality Austin Null from The Nive Nulls. They also decided to start their own YouTube channel called Meet The Nulls. On November 27, 2016, they welcomed their first child, Scarlett Everly Null.

== Skills ==
- Vault - 1 1/2 Twisting Yurchenko
- Uneven bars - Yarotska; Giant 1/1 Pirouette; Giant 1/2 Pirouette; Khorkina; Giant 1 1/2 Pirouette; Piked Jaeger; Church; Toe-on 1/1 Pirouette; Overshoot to Handstand; Stalder Hecht; Giant 1/2 Pirouette; Double Front Tuck Dismout
- Balance Beam - Front Handspring Mount; Aerial to Back Layout to Back Layout; Illusion; Double Turn; Front Tuck; Switch Leap to Roundoff Aerial; Double Back Somersault Dismount
- Floor Exercise - Triple Turn; Full Twisting Double Back; Arabian Double Front; Double Back Pike; 1.5 to a full twist

=== Eponymous skill ===
Hopfner-Hibbs previously had one eponymous skill listed in the Code of Points. It was removed in the 2017 version of the code.

Apparatus	Name	Description	Difficulty (Note: Valid for the 2013-2016 Code of Points)
Floor exercise	Hopfner-Hibbs	2/1 (720°) illusion turn without hand or foot support	C
