= Henry Owen (disambiguation) =

Henry Owen was a Welsh theologian.

Henry Owen may also refer to:

- Henry D. Owen (1920–2011), American diplomat
- Henry Owen, character in Phobia
- Henry Owen, Sheriff of Anglesey in 1652

== See also ==
- Henry Owens (disambiguation)
- Harry Owen (disambiguation)
