= Durratun Nashihin Rosli =

Malaysian rhythmic gymnast

- Born: November 17, 1988 (age 37)

Gymnastics career
- Country represented: Malaysia
Medal record
Commonwealth Games
Silver medal – second place	2006 Melbourne	Team
Silver medal – second place	2006 Melbourne	Individual
Silver medal – second place	2006 Melbourne	Clubs
Silver medal – second place	2006 Melbourne	Rope

Durratun Nashihin Rosli (born 17 November 1988) is a Malaysian rhythmic gymnast.

She competed at the 2006 Commonwealth Games where she won silver medals in the team, individual, clubs and rope events.
