= Adam Cox =

British artistic gymnast (born 1986)

- Born: 13 November 1986 (age 39) Edinburgh
- Height: 5 ft 9 in (175 cm)

Gymnastics career
- Discipline: Men's artistic gymnastics
- Country represented: (United Kingdom) Great Britain; Scotland; (1998–2014)
- Gym: Alloa Gymnastics Club; Leeds Gymnastics Club; City of Glasgow Gymnastics Club
- Former coach: Tan Jia En
Medal record
Men's artistic gymnastics
Representing Scotland
Commonwealth Games
Silver medal – second place	2014 Glasgow	Team
Bronze medal – third place	2006 Melbourne	Horizontal bar

Adam Cox (born 13 November 1986) is a British male artistic gymnast, representing the United Kingdom and Scotland at international competitions. He competed for Scotland at 3 Commonwealth Games; 2002, 2006, and 2014. He also competed at world and European championships, including the 2006 World Artistic Gymnastics Championships in Aarhus, Denmark.
