= Heather Mann =

British rhythmic gymnast

- Born: 9 July 1989 (age 37)

Gymnastics career
- Discipline: Rhythmic gymnastics
- Country represented: Great Britain England; (2005-2006 (?))

Heather Mann (born 9 July 1989) is a British individual rhythmic gymnast representing England and Great Britain at international competitions. She competed at world championships, including at the 2005 World Rhythmic Gymnastics Championships where she finished in 3rd place. She represented England at the 2006 Commonwealth Games, finishing 9th in the individual all-around event.

== See also ==
- 2005 World Rhythmic Gymnastics Championships
