= Liam Davie =

British artistic gymnast (born 1993)

- Born: 26 March 1993 (age 33)

Gymnastics career
- Discipline: Men's artistic gymnastics
- Country represented: (United Kingdom) Great Britain; Scotland
Medal record
Men's artistic gymnastics
Representing Scotland
Commonwealth Games
Silver medal – second place	2014 Glasgow	Team all-around
Northern European Championships
Gold medal – first place	2013 Lisburn	High Bar
Silver medal – second place	2012 Glasgow	High Bar
Silver medal – second place	2013 Lisburn	Team

Liam Davie (born 26 March 1993) is a British artistic gymnast. He represented Scotland at the 2014 Commonwealth Games in Glasgow. As part of the Scotland team, Davie won a silver medal in the team all-around competition.
