= Shavahn Church =

American/British artistic gymnast

- Full name: Shavahn Nikole Church
- Born: May 3, 1989 (age 37) Van Nuys, Los Angeles, California, U.S.
- Height: 1.57 m (5 ft 2 in)

Gymnastics career
- Discipline: Women's artistic gymnastics
- Country represented: Great Britain England
- Former countries represented: United States
- College team: University of California, Los Angeles
- Club: Heathrow, Waller's GymJam Academy
- Head coaches: Chris Waller, Valorie Kondos Field
- Former coaches: Kristen Maloney, Don Peters, Yu Feng
- Eponymous skills: Uneven Bars
- Retired: 2008
Medal record
Representing England
Commonwealth Games
Silver medal – second place	2006 Melbourne	Team
Silver medal – second place	2006 Melbourne	Uneven Bars

Shavahn Nikole Church (born May 3, 1989 in Van Nuys, Los Angeles, California) is an American-British artistic gymnast who lives and trained in California. She formerly competed for the United States but decided in 2005 to represent Great Britain.

== Early life ==
Church was born and raised in California to British parents Raymond and Mandy Church. She has two sisters, Carley and Jade, who were also born in the United Kingdom. Her grandparents live in England.

She began training gymnastics at age 7.

== Career ==
Church was a member of the U.S. Junior National Team in 2003. In 2004, she competed at the American Classic, finishing third on floor exercise and fifth all-around. Her placements qualified her for the U.S. championships in June 2004, where she broke her hand on her first event, the uneven bars.

Following an October 2004 ACL tear and faced with the likelihood of not making the U.S. Worlds team for 2005, Church decided to switch to competing for Great Britain while continuing to live and train in the U.S. She made her major international debut at the 2005 World Championships in Melbourne. Not fully recovered from an injury and severely out of competition practice, she placed 20th in the all-around.

Church was a member of the English team for the 2006 Commonwealth Games in Melbourne. Due to an injury to captain and world bronze medallist Beth Tweddle, the team had to compete with only four members, and were unable to challenge Australia for the gold medal. Instead, in the last rotation, they were in a dogfight with Canada for the silver. Church's bars routine secured second place for the team. In the all-around, Church was in medal contention until her beam routine, where a narrow save after a large wobble was not enough to prevent her from dropping behind, and she finished fifth. In apparatus finals, she bounced back, finishing second on bars to Elyse Hopfner-Hibbs of Canada.

Church was also a member of the British team for the 2006 European Championships in Greece. She had hopes of more success on bars (her highest Commonwealth Games score would have qualified her to the European finals), but injury struck in the qualifying rounds and she was unable to complete the competition. Later in 2006, she underwent surgery, and the recovery kept her out of further competition that year.

As a member of the University of California, Los Angeles women's gymnastics team, Church's competition debut was delayed after arthroscopic surgery on her right knee. In 2008, her only year of competition, she scored a season-best (9.875) at the NCAA Women's Gymnastics Championships, which was her final gymnastics meet. She was named a UCLA letterwinner for the year.

In July 2008, Church announced her retirement from gymnastics and began a coaching career in California.

== Eponymous skill ==
Church has an eponymous uneven bars release move listed in the Code of Points.

Apparatus	Name	Description	Difficulty (Note: Valid for the 2022-2024 Code of Points)
Uneven bars	Church	Pike sole circle backward counter pike hecht over high bar to hang	E

== Competitive History ==
Year	Event	Team	AA	VT	UB	BB	FX
Junior
2003	American Classic		4	4	1st place, gold medalist(s)		
2003	US National Championships				6		8
2004	American Classic		5				
2004	US Classic		5	8	6	3rd place, bronze medalist(s)	
Senior
2005	World Championships		20				
2006	Commonwealth Games	2nd place, silver medalist(s)	5		2nd place, silver medalist(s)		
Collegiate
2008	NCAA Championships	2nd place, silver medalist(s)					
