= Alyssa Brown =

Canadian artistic gymnast

- Born: May 11, 1989 (age 37)

Gymnastics career
- Country represented: Canada
Medal record
Commonwealth Games
Silver medal – second place	2006 Melbourne	Vault
Bronze medal – third place	2006 Melbourne	Team all-around
Pan American Gymnastics Championships
Bronze medal – third place	2005 Rio de Janeiro	Balance Beam
Bronze medal – third place	2005 Rio de Janeiro	Team
Pacific Rim Championships
Bronze medal – third place	2006 Honolulu	Team
Bronze medal – third place	2006 Honolulu	Vault

Alyssa Brown (born 11 May 1989) is a Canadian artistic gymnast.

Brown competed at the 2006 Commonwealth Games where she won a silver medal in the vault event and a bronze medal in the team event.

She also won two bronze medals at the 2005 Pan American Gymnastics Championships in the team and balance beam events.
