= Kimberly Mason =

Australian rhythmic gymnast

- Born: 19 September 1989 (age 36) Manly, Sydney

Gymnastics career
- Discipline: Rhythmic gymnastics
- Country represented: Australia
Medal record
Commonwealth Games
Silver medal – second place	2006 Melbourne	Ball
Bronze medal – third place	2006 Melbourne	Clubs
Bronze medal – third place	2006 Melbourne	Team

Kimberly Mason (born 19 September 1989 in Manly, Sydney, New South Wales, Australia) is an Australian rhythmic gymnast. She started rhythmic gymnastics in 1996 at Presbyterian Ladies' College, Sydney, in New South Wales, under the head coach Nicole Higham.

Mason has had consistently strong performances in international competitions. In the 2005 Australian Championships, she was second, continuing to be selected for the Australian World Championships team. At the 2005 World Championships in Baku, Azerbaijan, she competed in only three out of four apparatus but was ranked 64th overall, while the next Australian, Naazmi Johnston, was ranked in 94th. In the 2006 Melbourne Commonwealth Games, Mason earned two individual medals (2nd ball, 3rd clubs) and a team medal.
