= Kitty Chiller =

Australian modern pentathlete

Kitty Chiller AM OLY
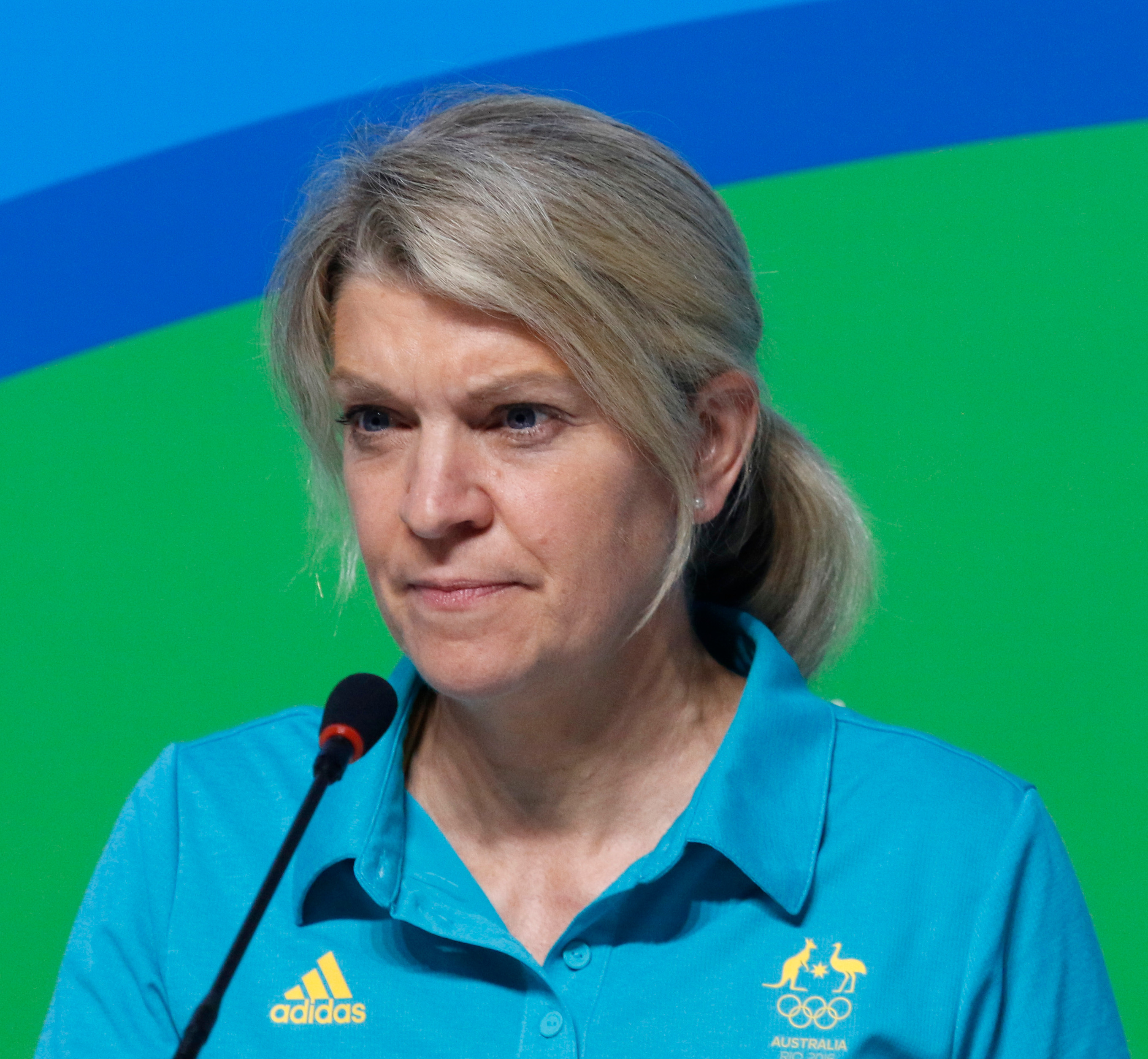
- Chiller at the 2016 Olympics

Personal information
- Born: 2 October 1964 (age 62) Melbourne, Australia
- Height: 168 cm (5 ft 6 in)
- Weight: 57 kg (9 st 0 lb; 126 lb)

Sport
- Country: Australia
- Sport: Modern pentathlon
- Club: Vampa

Kitty Chiller AM (born 2 October 1964) is a former modern pentathlete who represented Australia at the 2000 Summer Olympics in Sydney. In 2013, she was named as the Chef de Mission for Australia at the 2016 Summer Olympics held in Rio de Janeiro, Brazil.

== Personal life ==
Chiller was born in Melbourne. She completed an arts degree in criminology and Latin at the University of Melbourne in 1985. Both of her elder sisters died of cancer, aged 49 and 53.

== Athletic career ==
Chiller first competed internationally while she was a student at university. Initially she took part in the sport of aquathon before she joined the University of Melbourne fencing club and began her modern pentathlon career. She was national champion on 12 occasions, won seven World Cup medals and was ranked number one in the world in 1996, 1997 and 1998.

She competed in the women's event at the 2000 Summer Olympics held in her home nation. She placed 16th in the shooting component, 18th in fencing, 10th in swimming, 2nd in riding and 14th in the run, gaining a total of 4886 points and finishing 14th overall in the event. Following the Games she announced her retirement from the sport.

== Sports administration career ==
Following her retirement from competition she took up a position at the Holmesglen Institute of TAFE in Melbourne where she was responsible for providing training to 15,000 members of the workforce for the 2006 Commonwealth Games that were held in the city. She also worked on training for the 2006 Asian Games, held in Doha, Qatar and spent 20 months living in the city.

At the 2012 Summer Olympics, held in London, United Kingdom, Chiller was the Deputy Chef de Mission of the Australian team; working under the Chef de Mission, former Olympic rower Nick Green, she was responsible for athlete and support services as well as the medical headquarters.

In 2013, ahead of the 2016 Summer Olympics held in Rio de Janeiro, Brazil, the Australian Olympic Committee named Chiller as the Chef de Mission for the 2016 Australian team; she is the first female to hold the role for Australia.

In addition to her job with the Australian Olympic team Chiller was the President of Modern Pentathlon Australia and has been appointed to the International Modern Pentathlon Union's 'Sport for All' Commission. In 2016 Chiller has been involved in a controversial exchange of views with Nick Kyrgios. This has resulted in Kyrgios withdrawing from contention for the Olympics complaining of unfair treatment. Chiller continued her insistence upon discipline amongst current athletes, by banning Rio gold medallist Emma McKeon and fellow swimmer Josh Palmer from the Olympic closing ceremony after both breached team protocols. The ban on Emma McKeon was later revoked.

Kitty Chiller was appointed Chief Executive Officer of Gymnastics Australia and held the role from December 2017-March 2022. In March 2022 she was appointed to a role of Deputy CEO of National Sports Tribunal Australia despite some controversy of her actions as a CEO of Gymnastics Australia. In July 2023, she was promoted to Acting CEO of the National Sports Tribunal. After 2 months in the interim role of Acting CEO, Chiller returned to Deputy CEO role with an appointment of Dr Michelle Gallen

Another role occupied by Chiller was the President of Oceania Gymnastics Union. After July 2022 she stayed in the role for 9 months being permitted to perform this function in limited capacity due to current sanctions from International Gymnastics Federation prohibiting her from formally representing the FIG or the OGU (i.e. making speeches, awarding prizes or any other act of ceremonial representation) in connection with any gymnastics competition on the FIG calendar for a period of 2 years. In March 2023 Chiller stepped down from her presidency role at OGU and executive committee role at FIG.

== Scandals ==
=== Nick Kyrgios ===
Chiller has publicly questioned the world No. 20's position in the Olympic team, which has angered the 21-year-old who has made a conscious effort to try to clean up his image after a drama-plagued opening to his career. At the heart of frustrations is Chiller's comments just over a week ago in which she put Kyrgios in the same category as the recently under fire Tomic.

In her latest comments, Chiller declared on Friday: "Kyrgios doesn't really understand what it means to be an Australian Olympian".

Chiller's comments have been deemed by some as uninformed given she has not met or spoken to Kyrgios or his team. However, she continues to hang the axe over the controversial athlete's head.

In January 2024 Nick Kyrgios suggested that due to his treatment by AOC and particularly Kitty Chiller he would not represent Australia at the 2024 Summer Olympics. Kyrgios stated:

"“The way I was treated by the Australian Olympic Committee and former chef de mission Kitty Chiller will never be forgotten."

=== Sanctions from Gymnastics Ethics Foundation ===
Chiller has been sanctioned for her role in “judging irregularities” at an Olympic qualification event in 2021 and banned from representing international gymnastic bodies for two years. During the event two insufficiently qualified Superior Jury made changes to scores that resulted in change of ranking in Olympic qualification. The event was riddled with technical and behavioural breaches. Chiller was, at the time of the relevant facts, a GA (Gymnastics Australia), OGU (Oceania Gymnastics Union) and FIG (International Gymnastics Federation) official. Chiller, in her capacity of President of the OGU and CEO of GA, breached FIG General Judges’ Rules and FIG Code of Discipline. She further breached her general duty of diligence and care enshrined in FIG Code of Ethics and FIG Statutes as described above. During the disciplinary proceedings Chiller was found by the Gymnastics Ethics Foundation (GEF) to have provided a false sworn statement to the Court of Arbitration for Sport about her role in a judging controversy at a qualifying event for the Tokyo Olympics.

=== Mismanagement of investigation into gymnast abuse at the National Centre of Excellence. ===
A parent of abuse victim alleged that Kitty Chiller, then CEO of Gymnastics Australia (GA), improperly ended an investigation in 2018 despite multiple parents providing evidence of concerns.

When the parent later lodged a formal complaint about Chiller’s decision to close the 2018 investigation, the complaint was rejected as “out of scope” under the Supplementary Complaints Management Process (SCMP). The issue: the SCMP only allowed complaints about direct abuse or harassment toward athletes, not about how officials handled past allegations.

Later it was revealed that the supposedly independent SCMP was co-drafted by Gymnastics Australia, including personnel from the CEO’s office. This raised concerns because the process ultimately shielded officials—including Chiller—from scrutiny about their handling of abuse allegations.

The SCMP’s narrow scope excluded complaints about officials who may have mishandled or ignored abuse allegations, which meant complaints involving Chiller’s administrative decisions could not be investigated.
