= Ju Ping Tian =

Chinese-Australian gymnastics coach

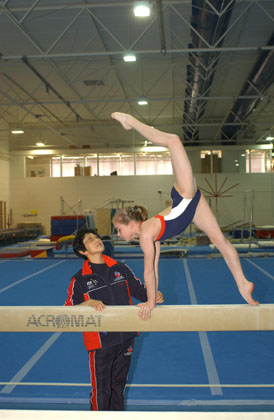
- Full name: Ju Ping Tian
- Born: October 8, 1942 (age 84)

Gymnastics career
- Discipline: Women's Artistic Gymnastics
- Country represented: Australia; (Australia)
- Former countries represented: China
- Club: Australian Institute of Sport

Ju Ping Tian AM (Chinese: 田菊坪, born 8 October 1942) is a Chinese Australian gymnastics coach who was Head Coach of the Australian Women's Artistic Team and Australian Institute of Sport women's artistic program.

Tian was a member of the Chinese national gymnastics team and received the Chinese Masters award as an athlete in 1957. She completed a physical education degree at the Beijing Sport University. Tian coached Chinese athletes from 1965 to 1983 to Olympic and world championship medals and from 1981 to 1983 she was the Chinese National Women's Coach.

Tian moved to Australia with her family in 1983 under an agreement for sport exchanges with China. Her first coaching job in Australia was at the NSW State Sports Centre. In 1985, she was appointed Head Coach of the Australian Institute of Sport Women's Artistic Gymnastics program replacing Kazuya Honda who relocated to Melbourne. She held this position until 2004 and was subsequently appointed the National Junior Development Coach.

Tian was Australian Women's Artistic Head Coach from 1985 until 1996.

Tian has been recognised for her outstanding contributions to the development of Australian gymnastics and is credited to significantly improving Australia's international ranking. As a result she was subsequently appointed a Member of the Order of Australia (AM) in 2006 by the Governor-General of Australia.

== Coaching career ==
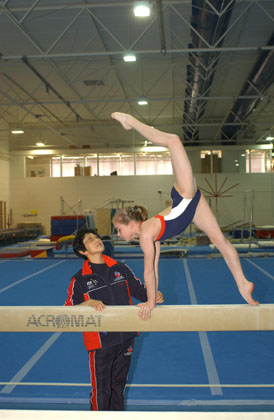
Australian Institute of Sport Head Coach Women's Artistic Gymnastics coaching AIS gymnast Hollie Dykes on the balance beam in 2003

Australian Team's performances at major competitions whilst she was head coach were:

- 1985 World Artistic Gymnastics Championships - 17th in team competition.
- 1986 Commonwealth Gymnastic Federation Championships - 3rd in team competition.
- 1987 World Artistic Gymnastics Championships - 17th in team competition.
- 1989 World Artistic Gymnastics Championships - 16th in team competition; Monique Allen 25th all round.
- 1990 Commonwealth Games - 3rd in team competition; one gold, one silver and 5 bronze medals.
- 1991 World Artistic Gymnastics Championships - 6th in team competition - qualified for Barcelona Olympics women's team competition for first time.
- 1992 Barcelona Olympics - 7th in team competition; Monique Allen 19th Lisa Read 30th and Kylie Shadbolt 36th.
- 1994 Commonwealth Games - 3rd in team competition; two gold, one silver and three bronze medals.
- 1995 World Artistic Gymnastics Championships - 12th in team competition - qualified for Atlanta Olympics women's team competition.
- 1996 Atlanta Olympics - 10th in team competition.

Australian Olympic gymnasts developed by Tian at the Australian Institute of Sport include: Kellie Wilson, Monique Allen, Leanne Rycroft, Kylie Shadbolt, Lisa Read, Julie-Anne Monico, Ruth Moniz and Hollie Dykes.

In 1995, the Australian Institute of Sport held an Inquiry into her coaching and training methods after accusations by several former gymnasts but Tian was cleared by the Inquiry led by sports lawyer Hayden Opie.

In 1997, after being replaced as Head Coach of the Australian team, Murray Chessell, President of Gymnastics Australia stated that Tian's "work inspired a generation of gymnasts and her leadership style and training methods created a high performance culture which formed a model for high performance centres throughout the country."

== Recognition ==
- 1990-1992 - Gymnastics Australia Women's Artistic Coach of the Year
- 1991 - Sport Australia Awards Coach of The Year
- 1991 - Australian Coaching Council Team Coach of the Year
- 2000 - Australian Sports Medal
- 2006 - Member of the Order of Australia (AM) for service to gymnastics, particularly through the development of the Women's Gymnastics program at the Australian Institute of Sport.
- Gymnastics Australia Hall of Fame for 10 years outstanding service dedicated to developing and improving Australia's international ranking.
