= Hannah Clowes =

British artistic gymnast (born 1991)

- Nickname: Han
- Born: 24 February 1991 (age 35) Macclesfield, Cheshire, England
- Height: 155 cm (5 ft 1 in)

Gymnastics career
- Discipline: Women's artistic gymnastics
- Country represented: Great Britain; England
- Club: City of Liverpool
- Head coach: Amanda Reddin
- Assistant coach: Claire Duffy
Medal record
Representing England
Commonwealth Games
Silver medal – second place	2006 Melbourne	Team

Hannah Clowes (born 24 February 1991) is an English artistic gymnast who has represented England at the 2006 Commonwealth Games and Great Britain at the 2007 World Artistic Gymnastics Championships. She did not make the Beijing Olympic Team. Clowes also more recently attended Liverpool Johns Moores University, where she studied Sports science related to gymnastics.
