= Henry Owens =

Henry Owens may refer to:

- Henry Owens (left-handed pitcher) (born 1992), American baseball pitcher
- Henry Owens (right-handed pitcher) (born 1979), American baseball pitcher
- Henry Owens (born 1914), Scottish boxer who fought under the name "Jake Kilrain"

== See also ==
- Henry Owen (disambiguation)
