= Greenhill School =

Greenhill School may refer to:

- Greenhill School (Addison, Texas), a private day school in Addison, Texas
- Ysgol Greenhill School, a secondary school inf Tenby, Pembrokeshire
- Greenhill Primary School, Beauchief and Greenhill, Sheffield
- Greenhill Middle School
- Green Hill School (Chehalis, Washington), a juvenile detention facility in Washington state

== See also ==
- Greenhills School
- Greenhill Academy
