= Sam Offord =

Australian artistic gymnast

Samuel Offord
- Born: 4 March 1986 (age 40) Naracoorte, South Australia

Gymnastics career
- Discipline: Men's artistic gymnastics
- Country represented: Australia
Medal record
Men's artistic gymnastics
Representing Australia
Commonwealth Games
Gold medal – first place	2010 Delhi	Team
Gold medal – first place	2010 Delhi	Rings
Silver medal – second place	2006 Melbourne	Team
Bronze medal – third place	2006 Melbourne	Vault

Samuel Offord (born 4 March 1986) is an Australian former artistic gymnast.

== Gymnastics career ==
Born in the town of Naracoorte, Offord got his start in gymnastics at the age of six and first trained at the Koorana Gymnastics Club in Adelaide. He represented Australia at the 2006 Commonwealth Games, winning two medals. His best international performance came at the 2010 Commonwealth Games in Delhi, where he was a gold medalist in both the rings and team all-around events. He also featured in five editions of the World Championships. An ankle injury ruled him out of contention for a place on the 2012 Summer Olympic team.

== Sports administration career ==
Offord was appointed as Gymnastics Australia's Board Director in November 2021. In May 2023 Offord was appointed acting President following Professor Carol Mill’s decision to step down as President.
