= Harry George Owen =

Welsh gymnast and circus performer

- Born: 6 October 1993 (age 32) Tenby, Pembrokeshire, Wales

Gymnastics career
- Discipline: Men's artistic gymnastics
- Country represented: Wales
- Retired: 2014
Medal record
Commonwealth Youth Games
| Bronze medal – third place | 2011 Isle Of Man | All-around |

Harry George Owen (born 1993) is a Welsh former artistic gymnast and circus performer. He won a bronze medal in the individual all-around at the 2011 Commonwealth Youth Games and represented Wales at the 2014 Commonwealth Games in Glasgow. After retiring from competition he performed with Cirque du Soleil.

== Early life ==
Owen was born in 1993 and raised in Tenby, Pembrokeshire, Wales, where he attended St Oswald's School and Greenhill School. He began gymnastics at the age of six at his local club and joined the Swansea Centre of Excellence at the age of eight. He later studied sports coaching at Loughborough University, where he also trained.

== Gymnastics career ==
As a junior, Owen won 11 medals at the UK School Games and became British under-18 champion on the pommel horse. At the 2011 Commonwealth Youth Games on the Isle of Man, Owen won the bronze medal in the men's individual all-around with a score of 79.550, behind Dominick Cunningham and Jay Thompson of England. In November of the same year, he was part of the Wales team that won gold in the men's team event at the Northern European Championships in Uppsala, Sweden.

Owen competed in Germany's Deutsche Turnliga for TV Großen-Linden during the 2012 and 2013 seasons, including in the 3. Bundesliga Nord.

At the 2013 Northern European Gymnastics Championships in Lisburn, Northern Ireland, Owen was part of the Wales team that won the bronze medal in the men's team event with a score of 241.025.

He was named in the five-man Welsh men's artistic gymnastics team for the 2014 Commonwealth Games in Glasgow, alongside Jac Davies, Iwan Mepham, Clinton Purnell and Robert Sansby, and reached the final of the men's individual all-around competition.

== Post-gymnastics career ==
After retiring from competitive gymnastics, Owen joined Cirque du Soleil in 2016, performing in the touring production Volta and later in Totem. In Volta, his first Cirque du Soleil production, Owen performed the Swiss rings act. He also founded underwear company House of Harry George.
