= Alexandra Orlando =

Canadian rhythmic gymnast

- Full name: Alexandra Michel Orlando
- Born: January 19, 1987 (age 39) Toronto, Ontario, Canada
- Height: 167 cm (5 ft 6 in)

Gymnastics career
- Discipline: Rhythmic gymnastics
- Country represented: Canada
- Club: Ritmika
- Head coach: Dimitrichka Masleva
- Assistant coach: Elvira Boudakova
Medal record
Representing Canada
Commonwealth Games
Gold medal – first place	2006 Melbourne	All-Around
Gold medal – first place	2006 Melbourne	Ball
Gold medal – first place	2006 Melbourne	Clubs
Gold medal – first place	2006 Melbourne	Ribbon
Gold medal – first place	2006 Melbourne	Rope
Gold medal – first place	2006 Melbourne	Team
Pan American Games
Gold medal – first place	2007 Rio de Janeiro	Clubs
Gold medal – first place	2007 Rio de Janeiro	Rope
Gold medal – first place	2007 Rio de Janeiro	Hoop
Silver medal – second place	2003 Santo Domingo	Hoop
Silver medal – second place	2003 Santo Domingo	Clubs
Silver medal – second place	2003 Santo Domingo	Ribbon
Silver medal – second place	2003 Santo Domingo	Group All-Around
Bronze medal – third place	2003 Santo Domingo	Ball
Bronze medal – third place	2003 Santo Domingo	Group Ribbons
Bronze medal – third place	2003 Santo Domingo	Group Hoops-Balls

Alexandra Michel Orlando (born January 19, 1987) is a retired Canadian rhythmic gymnast. She represented Canada at the 2008 Olympic Games, the Commonwealth Games, and Pan American Games.

== Biography ==
Orlando was born in Toronto, Ontario and attended Havergal College. She trained at the Ritmika RG Club under Mimi Masleva, a native of Bulgaria.

Orlando won every rhythmic gymnastics event at the Canadian National Championships in 2003, 2004, 2005, 2006, and 2007. Orlando swept the individual event finals at the Elite Canada rhythmic gymnastics competition in 2007 and also won the all-around crown. At the world championships in September, she finished ninth in the all-around competition and qualified for the Olympic Games in Beijing. She placed 18th in Beijing.

She won all six rhythmic gymnastics events included as part of the gymnastics program at the 2006 Commonwealth Games in Melbourne. She joined Graham Smith (1978, Edmonton), Susie O'Neill (1998, Kuala Lumpur) and Ian Thorpe (2002, Manchester) as the only competitors to win six gold medals at a single Commonwealth Games.

Orlando currently studies commerce at the University of Toronto. She is the subject of the book Alexandra Orlando: In Pursuit Of Victory (Toronto: BookLand Press, 2006) by Martin Avery.

Orlando is of Italian descent; her father is Sicilian and mother from Salerno. She stated in an interview, "I went last summer for vacations for two weeks. I have many Italian relatives, my family is from the South. My mother is from Salerno, and my father is Sicilian. They all live there still, just my family lives in Canada."
