= Nathan Gafuik =

Canadian artistic gymnast (born 1985)

- Born: June 12, 1985 (age 41) Calgary, Alberta, Canada
- Height: 165 cm (5 ft 5 in)

Gymnastics career
- Discipline: Men's artistic gymnastics
- Country represented: Canada
- Head coach: Tony Smith
Medal record
Artistic Gymnastics
Commonwealth Games
Gold medal – first place	2006 Melbourne	Team
Silver medal – second place	2006 Melbourne	All-around
Silver medal – second place	2006 Melbourne	Vault
Bronze medal – third place	2014 Glasgow	Team

Nathan Gafuik (born June 12, 1985) is a Canadian gymnast, who has competed at two Summer Olympics (2008 and 2012) and has won medals at Commonwealth level.

== Early life ==
He took up gymnastics at the age of four and has achieved gymnastic success despite a diagnosis of Addison's disease at the age of 15. He won the Canadian junior all-around title at the 2003 Canadian National Championships, leading him to be named as Canada's alternate at the 2004 Olympic Games, although he was unused.

== Gymnastics career ==
=== Early gymnastics career ===
At the 2006 Commonwealth Games in Melbourne, he won three medals, a gold and two silvers. The gold came in the men's team event, with the silvers coming in the men's all-round and the men's vault. That year he was also part of the Canadian men's team that came 6th at the World Gymnastics Championship in Aarhus, the best result ever for a Canadian team. He won senior Canadian national titles in the vault (2005, 2006 and 2008), the parallel bars (2006) and the floor (2008). In 2007, he underwent wrist surgery in spring 2007, the time off contributing to his fifth place in the men's all-round in the Canadian Championships before the 2008 Olympics.

=== 2008 Summer Olympics ===
The youngest member of the Canadian men's gymnastics team, Gafuik competed at the 2008 Summer Olympics, finishing in 17th place in the men's all-round, the second best performance ever by a Canadian gymnast.

He then won the 2010 Canadian Championships. In 2011, while studying at Athabasca University, he won a medal at the Universidae, bronze in the men's all-round. It was the first medal Canada won at that championships.

=== 2012 Summer Olympics ===
Canada's only male gymnast to qualify for the 2012 Summer Olympics, Gafuik's preparation for the Games was hampered by a thumb injury, severe enough to require surgery. He did not compete in all of the events, sitting out the other apparatus qualifiers to concentrate on the high bar, his favoured event. His score of 13.866, due to a fall from the bar, was not enough to qualify him for the final.

=== 2014 Commonwealth Games ===
He was part of the Canadian team that took bronze in the men's team event at the 2014 Commonwealth Games, along with Zachary Clay, Anderson Loran, Kevin Lytwyn and Scott Morgan.
