= Hollie Dykes =

Australian artistic gymnast

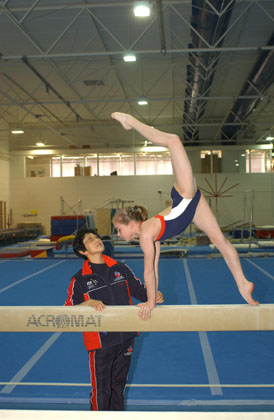
- AIS gymnast Hollie Dykes on the balance beam (right) with AIS coach Ju Ping Tian in 2003

Personal information
- Full name: Hollie Johnston Dykes
- Born: 12 September 1990 (age 35) Gold Coast, Queensland, Australia

Gymnastics career
- Discipline: Women's artistic gymnastics
- Country represented: Australia
- Retired: 2008
Medal record
Representing Australia
Commonwealth Games
Gold medal – first place	2006 Melbourne	Team
Gold medal – first place	2006 Melbourne	Floor Exercise
Silver medal – second place	2006 Melbourne	Balance Beam
Bronze medal – third place	2006 Melbourne	All-Around
Pacific Rim Championships
Silver medal – second place	2006 Honolulu	Team
Bronze medal – third place	2006 Honolulu	All-Around

Hollie Johnston Dykes (born 12 September 1990) is an Australian retired gymnast.

== Early life ==
Dykes who was born in Gold Coast, Queensland, and began gymnastics at the age of four and a half. She started training at the Australian Institute of Sport (Canberra) in 1998 and was awarded a full scholarship there in 2000.

== Career ==
Dykes made her major international debut at the 2006 Commonwealth Games in Melbourne. She won gold in the women's floor exercise and as part of the women's team final. She earned a silver in the women's beam and a bronze in the women's all-around, beating Imogen Cairns of England.

In April of 2006, Dykes represented Australia at the Pacific Rim Championships in Honolulu. She won the silver medal with the Australian team as well as the bronze medal in the all-around behind Americans Chellsie Memmel and Nastia Liukin.

Later that year, Dykes competed in the World Championships in Aarhus, Denmark. She helped the Australian team to a respectable sixth-place finish, an improvement on the eight place in the 2004 Olympics. However, a fall from beam in qualification rounds left her unable to progress to the apparatus final, where she was a medal prospect. In the all-around, Dykes was one of only half a dozen gymnasts not to fall, but she still finished out of the medals, in seventh place.

Dykes announced her retirement from gymnastics on 11 January 2008, citing personal reasons.

Her younger brother Lyndon Dykes is a professional footballer who plays for Millwall and the Scotland national team.
