= India at the 2006 Commonwealth Games =

- CG code: IND
- CGA: Indian Olympic Association
- Website: olympic.ind.in

in Melbourne, Australia
- Competitors: 183
- Flag bearer: Rajyavardhan Singh Rathore
- Medals Ranked 4th: Gold 22 Silver 17 Bronze 11 Total 50

Commonwealth Games appearances (overview)
- 1934; 1938; 1950; 1954; 1958; 1962; 1966; 1970; 1974; 1978; 1982; 1986; 1990; 1994; 1998; 2002; 2006; 2010; 2014; 2018; 2022; 2026; 2030

India competed at the 2006 Commonwealth Games held in Melbourne, Australia, from 15 to 26 March 2006. It was the country's fourteenth appearance at the Commonwealth Games since making its debut at the 1934 British Empire Games.

The Indian contingent consisted of 183 athletes and 77 support staff. Shooter Rajyavardhan Singh Rathore was the flag bearer for India during the opening ceremony. India won 50 medals, comprising 22 gold, 17 silver, and 11 bronze medals, to finish fourth in the overall medal table. Samresh Jung won seven medals including five gold, one silver and one bronze and set three new Games records to win the David Dixon Award.

== Medal summary ==
=== Medals by sport ===
Medals by sport
Sport	Gold	Silver	Bronze	Total
Shooting	16	7	4	25
Weightlifting	3	5	1	9
Table tennis	2	0	1	3
Boxing	1	2	2	5
Athletics	0	2	1	3
Hockey	0	1	0	1
Badminton	0	0	2	2
Total	22	17	11	49

=== Medalists ===
Medal	Name	Sport	Event
Gold	Akhil Kumar	Boxing	Men's 54 kg
Gold	Samaresh Jung	Shooting	Men's 10 m air pistol
Gold	Samaresh Jung; Vivek Singh	Shooting	Men's 10 m air pistol – pairs
Gold	Gagan Narang	Shooting	Men's 10 m air rifle
Gold	Tejaswini Sawant	Shooting	Women's 10 m air rifle
Gold	Abhinav Bindra; Gagan Narang	Shooting	Men's 10 m air rifle – pairs
Gold	Avneet Kaur Sidhu; Tejaswini Sawant	Shooting	Women's 10 m air rifle – pairs
Gold	Pemba Tamang; Vijay Kumar	Shooting	Men's 25 m rapid fire pistol – pairs
Gold	Saroja Kumari; Sushma Rana	Shooting	Women's 25 m sport pistol – pairs
Gold	Ronak Pandit; Samaresh Jung	Shooting	Men's 25 m standard pistol – pairs
Gold	Samaresh Jung	Shooting	Men's 50 m free pistol
Gold	Gagan Narang	Shooting	Men's 50 m rifle 3 positions
Gold	Anuja Jung	Shooting	Women's 50 m rifle 3 positions
Gold	Abhinav Bindra; Gagan Narang	Shooting	Men's 50 m rifle 3 positions – pairs
Gold	Jaspal Rana; Samaresh Jung	Shooting	Men's 25 m centre-fire pistol – pairs
Gold	Rajyavardhan Singh Rathore	Shooting	Men's double trap
Gold	Vijay Kumar	Shooting	Men's 25 m rapid fire pistol
Gold	Sharath Kamal	Table tennis	Men's singles
Gold	Sharath Kamal; Shibaji Datta; Soumyadeep Roy; Subhajit Saha	Table tennis	Men's team
Gold	Geeta Rani	Weightlifting	Women's 75 kg
Gold	Kunjarani Devi Nameirakpam	Weightlifting	Women's 48 kg
Gold	Yumnam Chanu	Weightlifting	Women's 58 kg
Silver	Chitra Soman; Manjit Kaur; Pinki Parmanik; Rajwinder Kaur	Athletics	Women's 4 × 400 metres relay
Silver	Seema Antil	Athletics	Women's discus throw
Silver	Vijender Singh	Boxing	Men's 69 kg
Silver	Harpreet Singh	Boxing	Men's 91 kg
Silver	India women's team: Helen Mary; Kanti Baa; Nilima Kujur; Rajwinder Kaur; Sumrai Tete; Masira Surin; Subhadra Pradhan; Asunta Lakra; Jyoti Sunita Kullu; Mamta Kharab; Jasjeet Kaur Handa; Surinder Kaur; Saba Anjum Karim; Sanggai Chanu; Sarita Lakra; Rajni Bala	Hockey	Women's team
Silver	Vivek Singh	Shooting	Men's 10 m air pistol
Silver	Avneet Kaur Sidhu	Shooting	Women's 10 m air rifle
Silver	Samaresh Jung; Vivek Singh	Shooting	Men's 50 m free pistol – pairs
Silver	Abhinav Bindra	Shooting	Men's 50 m rifle 3 positions
Silver	Anjali Bhagwat; Anuja Jung	Shooting	Women's 50 m rifle 3 positions – pairs
Silver	Rajyavardhan Singh Rathore; Vikram Bhatnagar	Shooting	Men's double trap – pairs
Silver	Pemba Tamang	Shooting	Men's 25 m rapid fire pistol
Silver	Simple Kaur	Weightlifting	Women's +75 kg
Silver	Vicky Batta	Weightlifting	Men's 56 kg
Silver	Arun Murugesan	Weightlifting	Men's 62 kg
Silver	Laishram Monika Devi	Weightlifting	Women's 69 kg
Silver	Mohammed Zakir	Weightlifting	Men's 77 kg
Bronze	Ranjith Kumar Jayaseelan	Athletics	Men's discus throw (seated)
Bronze	Chetan Anand	Badminton	Men's singles
Bronze	Indian team: Anup Sridhar; Aparna Popat; Chetan Anand; Jwala Gutta; Rupesh Kumar; Saina Nehwal; Sanave Thomas; Shruti Kurian; Trupti Murgunde; V. Diju	Badminton	Mixed team
Bronze	Jitender Kumar	Boxing	Men's 51 kg
Bronze	Varghese Johnson	Boxing	Men's over 91 kg
Bronze	Abhinav Bindra	Shooting	Men's 10 m air rifle
Bronze	Samaresh Jung	Shooting	Men's 25 m centre-fire pistol
Bronze	Sanjeev Rajput	Shooting	Men's 50 m rifle prone
Bronze	Manavjit Singh Sandhu	Shooting	Men's trap
Bronze	Kasturi Chakraborty; Mouma Das; Nandita Saha; Poulomi Ghatak; Shamini Kumaresan	Table tennis	Women's team
Bronze	Sudhir Kumar	Weightlifting	Men's 69 kg

== Competitors ==
The Indian contingent consisted of 183 athletes who competed in 11 sports.

Sport	Men	Women	Total
Athletics	14	19	33
Badminton	5	5	10
Basketball	12	12	24
Boxing	11	—N/a	11
Gymnastics	5	8	13
Hockey	17	16	33
Shooting	16	11	27
Swimming	5	2	7
Synchronized swimming	—N/a	1	1
Table tennis	5	5	10
Weightlifting	9	5	14
Total	99	84	183
