= 2006 Commonwealth Games highlights =

The following article outlines the highlights of the 2006 Commonwealth Games.

== Highlights ==
=== Opening Ceremony – 15 March ===
Both the Melbourne Cricket Ground and the Yarra River were centrepieces for the ceremony, which included many fireworks, and other spectacle. The Games were opened by Elizabeth II, in her capacity as Head of the Commonwealth. The Queen is also Head of State of a number of Commonwealth countries, including Australia.

=== Day 1–16 March ===
Cycling
England managed a clean sweep of the 4,000 m individual pursuit gold medal on the cycle track. Paul Manning beat teammate Rob Hayles in the final. Steve Cummings won the bronze medal race. Australian Ben Kersten manages to beat the World and Olympic champions in the 1 km time trial.
Swimming
Scotland's Caitlin McClatchey beat Australia's Libby Lenton in the Women's 200 m freestyle final, setting a new Games record of 1:57.25. England's Melanie Marshall came in third. David Carry of Scotland has won the 400 m freestyle final, winning the second swimming gold for his country. Canadian Andrew Hurd picked up the silver in 3:49.08 and David Davies from Wales came third. Moss Burmester from New Zealand won gold in the 200 m butterfly in a new New Zealand and Commonwealth record time of 1:56.64.
Weightlifting
The Games' first gold medal was awarded in the Women's Weightlifting (48 kg class) to Nameirakpam Kunjarani from India. Marilou Dozois-Prevost from Canada won the silver, and Erika Yamasaki of Australia picked up the bronze.

=== Day 2–17 March ===
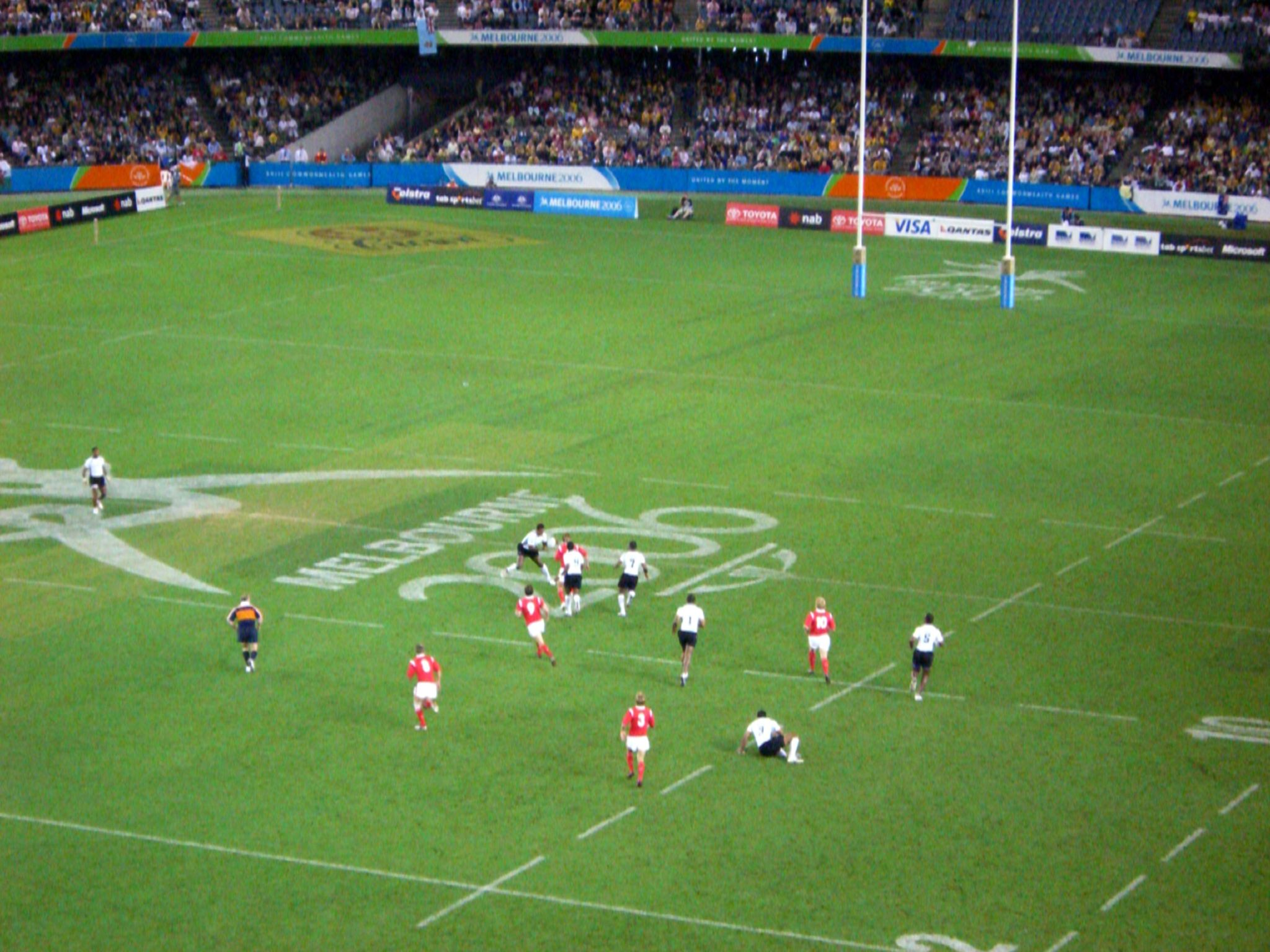
Rugby at the 2006 games

Cycling
Australians Katherine Bates and Rochelle Gilmore get gold and silver respectively in the Women's 25 km Points Race, repeating their Manchester Games results. Their teammate Alexis Rhodes took ninth place after being seriously injured in Germany in an accident that took the life of Amy Gillett, in whose honour all three dedicated their ride.
Rugby Sevens
New Zealand won the gold medal at the Telstra Dome with a convincing 29–21 win over England. Fiji win the bronze medal with a 24–17 win over Australia in a game marred by a serious injury to Australian player Scott Fava.
Swimming
Australia gets all three medals in both the women's 50 m butterfly and women's 50 m breaststroke.

=== Day 3–18 March ===
Swimming
Australia swept gold, silver, and bronze in both the women's 50 m breaststroke and the 50 m butterfly. Leisel Jones and Danni Miatke, respectively, won the golds.
Triathlon
Day 3 saw the Australians and New Zealanders completely dominate the triathlon event. After missing out on qualification for the 2004 Athens Olympics, Emma Snowsill took the gold medal with a time of 1:58:02.59. New Zealand secured silver (Samantha Warriner), bronze (Andrea Hewitt) and fourth place for the Women's event. Continuing Australia's dominance in the triathlon, Brad Kahlefeldt won gold in the men's triathlon event with a time of 1:49:16. Australian Peter Robertson was just beaten by New Zealander, Bevan Docherty for silver, while Robertson took the bronze.
Cycling
Australian cyclist Ryan Bayley won the men's sprint, his second gold medal for these Games.
Weightlifting
Australian weightlifter Ben Turner won the men's 69 kg Division, the first Australian gold medal for weightlifting at the games.

=== Day 4–19 March ===
Athletics
Australian Kerryn McCann successfully defends her 2002 Commonwealth Games gold medal title by winning the women's marathon event with a time of 2:30:50.
Athletics
Tanzania retained the men's marathon title, Samson Ramadhani taking the gold. Kenya's Fred Mogaka took silver, and England's Dan Robinson took the bronze.
Cycling
The Isle of Man won their first Commonwealth gold in twenty years, when Mark Cavendish won the men's Scratch Race final. Cavendish held off Australia's Ashley Hutchinson on the final bend to triumph, with Scotland's James McCallum claiming bronze.
Swimming
World champion Jessicah Schipper of Australia swam a Games record in beating teammate Libby Lenton for the women's 100 m butterfly gold.

=== Day 5–20 March ===
Athletics
Australian Craig Mottram and crowd favourite, is edged out by Augustine Choge in the men's 5000 m by 2 seconds. Choge won in a Games-record time of 12 min 56.41 s. At one stage during the race Mottram ran with 3 Kenyan racers in front of him and 3 Tanzanian racers behind him.
Athletics
Asafa Powell, world record holder, wins the men's 100 m sprint in a time of 10.03 seconds, ahead of Nigeria's Soji Fasuba and the Trinidadian Marc Burns. His Jamaican compatriot, Sheri-Ann Brooks won the women's 100 m in a personal best time of 11.19 s, ahead of South Africa's Geraldine Pillay and Delphine Antangana, of Cameroon.
Squash
The Grinham sisters (Australia) battled for the gold medal. Natalie triumphed over Rachel 2–9 9–6 9–1 9–6. Peter Nicol won his third Commonwealth Games gold medal. He previously won the singles title in 1998, and the doubles in 2002. He recaptured the singles title in four games, defeating Australia's David Palmer 9–5 10–8 4–9 9–2.
Swimming
Scotland won two more gold medals in the pool, with Caitlin McClatchey and Gregor Tait each winning their second titles in the 400 m freestyle and 200 m individual medley respectively. Australia's Leisel Jones set the first world record of the swimming competition, breaking her own record in the 100 m breaststroke with a time of 1:05.09.

=== Day 6–21 March ===
Swimming
The Australian women's swimming team again asserted their dominance in the pool, breaking the 4 x 100 m medley relay world record in a time of 3:56.30, over a second faster than that set by the Australian women's swimming team in the 2004 Athens Olympics. The Australian women completed one of the most successful campaigns in games' history, finishing with 16 gold medals, just 3 short of the entire meet's offerings. The Australian men's swimming team finishes on a successful note, winning the 4 x 100 m medley relay. This was one of their least successful games meets with 3 gold medals.
Athletics
The Kenyan women finish with Lucy Wangui (31:29.66) and Evelyne Nganga (31:30.86) gold and silver respectively in the 10,000 m run. Wangui overtook Nganga in the final straight, after Nganga attempted to break away. Mara Yamauchi of England was third.
Athletics
Dean Macey of England overcame injury to win his first major title in the men's Decathlon. Maurice Smith of Jamaica took silver and Australian Jason Dudley earned bronze.

=== Day 7–22 March ===
Athletics
New Zealander Valerie Vili won gold in the women's shot put, setting a new Commonwealth Games record of 19.66 metres.

=== Day 8–23 March ===
Athletics

Australian Jana Pittman delighted the home crowd by retaining her 400 m hurdles title with Britons Natasha Danvers-Smith (England) and Lee McConnell (Scotland) picking up silver and bronze.

Jamaica won gold and silver in the women's 200 m with Sherone Simpson finishing ahead of Veronica Campbell and South African Geraldine Pillay in third.

Cycling

England's Liam Killeen led an England one-two in the men's mountain bike cross country race. The 23-year-old eased home in two hours 13.11 minutes, ahead of team-mate Oli Beckingsale.

Canada's Marie-Hélène Prémont took gold in the Women's mountain bike cross country race at 1:55:04, despite having to dodge a kangaroo on the course. New Zealand's Rosara Joseph finished second and Canada's Kiara Biasro finished third.

Shooting

India's Rajyavardhan Singh Rathore won gold medal in Men's Double Trap.

=== Day 9–24 March ===
Athletics
Australian Nathan Deakes won the men's 50 km walk in a time of 3:42:53, beating the previous record set by him at the 2002 Manchester Commonwealth Games by over 10 minutes. New Zealander Tony Sargisson took a silver medal in 3:58:05 while Australia's Chris Erickson took the bronze in 3:58:22.
Basketball
The Australian men's team beat New Zealand 81–76 to win the first gold medal in this sport at the Commonwealth Games. The English men's team beat Nigeria 80–57 to take the bronze.

=== Day 10–25 March ===
Aquatics
Canadian Blythe Hartley won the Women's 3 m Springboard final with 690.05 points. Australians Chantelle Newbery and Kathryn Blackshaw took silver and bronze respectively.

Australian Matthew Helm won the Men's 10 m Platform with 1085.60 points. Silver went to England's Peter Waterfield with 1030.50 points and bronze went to Canadian Alexandre Despatie with 1016.95 points.

Athletics
England's Nicholas Nieland won the Men's Javelin with a season best throw of 80.10 m. Australians William Hamlyn Harris and Oliver Dziubak both threw 79.89 m with Harris securing silver on a countback throw of 79.48 on his final throw. Dziubak took bronze on his countback throw of 78.43.

Nick Willis, gold medallist in the 1500 metres in a time of 3:38.49 mins, became the first athlete from New Zealand to win a track medal for twenty-four years.

Boxing
England dominated the boxing finals day, with Don Broadhurst, Frankie Gavin, Jamie Cox, James Russan, David Price, and Stephen Smith winning gold medals and Darran Langley winning silver.

Scotland's Kenny Anderson won the Light Heavyweight gold after defeating his opponent, Adura Olalehin, 23–19 after fighting back from 7–13 down after two rounds. During the fight, Olalehin had four points, the same as the margin of victory, awarded against himself for repeatedly holding Anderson.

=== Day 11 – Closing Ceremony – 26 March ===
Gymnastics
Canadian Alexandra Orlando completed the rhythmic gymnastics competition having won seven gold medals – a gold in every rhythmic gymnastics event – to become the fourth competitor to win six gold medals at a single Commonwealth Games.

Cycling
Australians Nathalie Bates and Mathew Hayman win the women's and men's road races respectively.

Hockey
In the men's final, the host nation beat Pakistan 3–0, after leading 1–0 before the break. In the bronze medal play-off, England lost to Malaysia 2–0.

Netball
New Zealand defeats Australia 60–55 in the gold medal match, to become the first country other than Australia to win Commonwealth Games gold in the sport.

Closing Ceremony
Both the Melbourne Cricket Ground and the Yarra River were again centrepieces for the ceremony. Samresh Jung of India was given the David Dixon Award at the closing ceremony. He was the "Best Athlete of the 18th Commonwealth Games". The games were closed by The Earl of Wessex.
