= Weightlifting at the 2006 Commonwealth Games =

- Venue: Melbourne Convention & Exhibition Centre
- Location: Melbourne, Australia
- Dates: 15 to 26 March 2006

Weightlifting at the 2006 Commonwealth Games was the 15th appearance of Weightlifting at the Commonwealth Games. Competition was held in Melbourne, Australia, from 15 to 26 March 2006 and featured contests in 16 weight classes.

The Weightlifting events were held in a custom-built temporary venue within the Melbourne Convention & Exhibition Centre.

Australia topped the weightlifting medal table by virtue of winning four gold medals.

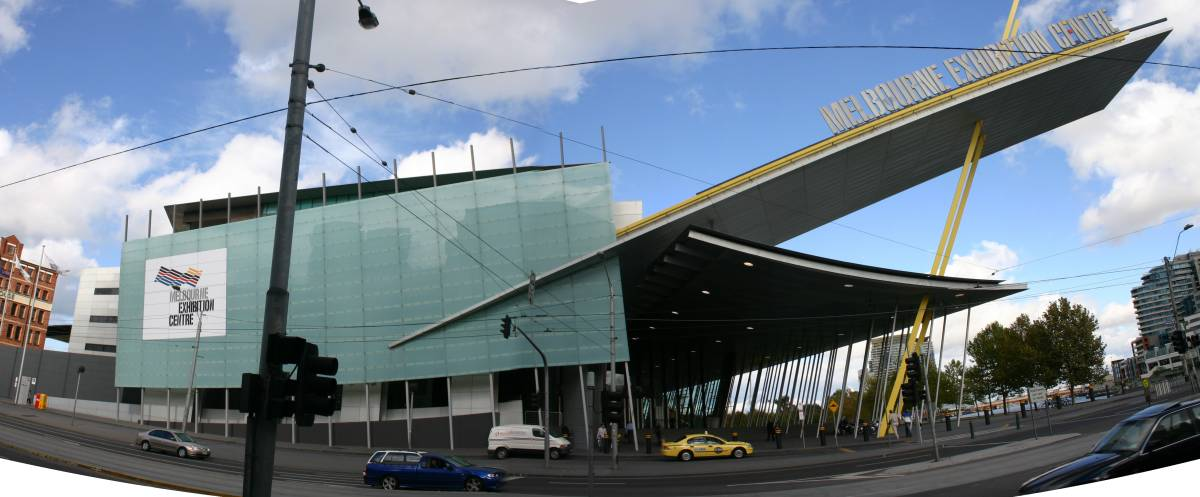
Melbourne Exhibition Centre

== Medal table ==
* Host nation (Australia)

Rank	Nation	Gold	Silver	Bronze	Total
1	Australia*	4	3	4	11
2	India	3	5	1	9
3	Canada	3	3	1	7
4	Malaysia	1	1	3	5
5	Pakistan	1	0	1	2
6	Ghana	1	0	0	1
6	Nigeria	1	0	0	1
6	Sri Lanka	1	0	0	1
6	Wales	1	0	0	1
10	Cameroon	0	1	1	2
10	Nauru	0	1	1	2
12	England	0	1	0	1
12	Papua New Guinea	0	1	0	1
14	New Zealand	0	0	1	1
14	Scotland	0	0	1	1
14	Seychelles	0	0	1	1
14	South Africa	0	0	1	1
Totals (17 entries)		16	16	16	48

== Events ==
=== Men's events ===
Event	Gold	Silver	Bronze
56 kg	Mohamed Faizal Baharom; Malaysia	Vicky Batta; India	Matin Guntali; Malaysia
62 kg	Chinthana Vidanage; Sri Lanka	Arun Murugesan; India	Abdul Rashid Bin Roswadi; Malaysia
69 kg	Benjamin Turner; Australia	Muhammad Hidayat; Malaysia	Sudhir Kumar Chitradurga; India
77 kg	Majeti Fetrie; Ghana	Mohammed Asdullah; India	Muhammad Irfan; Pakistan
85 kg	Shujauddin Malik; Pakistan	Brice Batchaya; Cameroon	Simplice Ribouem; Cameroon
94 kg	Aleksander Karapetyan; Australia	Simon Heffernan; Australia	Thomas Yule; Scotland
105 kg	Akos Sandor; Canada	Valeriane Sarava; Australia	Mohd Che Mat; Malaysia
+105 kg	Chris Rae; Australia	Damon Kelly; Australia	Itte Detenamo; Nauru

=== Women's events ===
Event	Gold	Silver	Bronze
48 kg	Kunjarani Devi; India	Marilou Dozois-Prevost; Canada	Erika Yamasaki; Australia
53 kg	Maryse Turcotte; Canada	Dika Toua; Papua New Guinea	Nadeene Latif; Australia
58 kg	Yumnam Chanu; India	Emily Quarton; Canada	Natasha Barker; Australia
63 kg	Michaela Breeze; Wales	Christine Girard; Canada	Miel McGerrigle; Canada
69 kg	Jeane Lassen; Canada	Monika Devi; India	Janet Georges; Seychelles
75 kg	Deborah Lovely; Australia	Sheba Deireragea; Nauru	Babalwa Ndleleni; South Africa
+75 kg	Geeta Rani; India	Simple Bhumrah; India	Keisha-Dean Soffe; New Zealand

=== Powerlifting ===
Event	Gold	Silver	Bronze
Open	Ruel Ishaku; Nigeria	Jason Irving; England	Darren Gardiner; Australia
