= Weightlifting at the 2006 Commonwealth Games – Women's +75 kg =

Weightlifting – Women's +75 kg at the 2006 Commonwealth Games
- Venue: Melbourne Exhibition Centre
- Dates: 22 March 2006
- Competitors: 11 from 9 nations
- Winning total weight: 241

Medalists
gold medal	Geeta Rani	India
silver medal	Simple Kaur	India
bronze medal	Keisha-Dean Soffe	New Zealand

The Women's +75 kg weightlifting event at the 2006 Commonwealth Games took place at the Melbourne Exhibition Centre on 22 March 2006. The weightlifter from India won the gold, lifting a total weight of 241 kg.

== Schedule ==
All times are Australian Eastern Standard Time (UTC+10)

Date	Time	Event
22 March 2006	14:00	Group A

== Records ==
Prior to this competition, the existing world, Commonwealth and Games records were as follows:

World record	Snatch	Ding Meiyuan (CHN)	137 kg	Vancouver, Canada	21 November 2003
World record	Clean & Jerk	Tang Gonghong (CHN)	182 kg	Athens, Greece	21 August 2004
World record	Total	Tang Gonghong (CHN)	305 kg	Athens, Greece	21 August 2004
Commonwealth record	Snatch				
Commonwealth record	Clean & Jerk				
Commonwealth record	Total				
Games record	Snatch	Olivia Baker (NZL)	100 kg	Manchester, Great Britain	3 August 2002
Games record	Clean & Jerk	Reanna Solomon (NRU)	127 kg	Manchester, Great Britain	3 August 2002
Games record	Total	Reanna Solomon (NRU)	227 kg	Manchester, Great Britain	3 August 2002

The following records were established during the competition:

Snatch	101 kg	Simple Kaur (IND)	GR
Snatch	104 kg	Geeta Rani (IND)	GR
Snatch	105 kg	Simple Kaur (IND)	GR
Clean & Jerk	128 kg	Simple Kaur (IND)	GR
Clean & Jerk	130 kg	Geeta Rani (IND)	GR
Clean & Jerk	135 kg	Simple Kaur (IND)	GR
Clean & Jerk	137 kg	Geeta Rani (IND)	GR
Total	233 kg	Simple Kaur (IND)	GR
Total	234 kg	Geeta Rani (IND)	GR
Total	240 kg	Simple Kaur (IND)	GR
Total	241 kg	Geeta Rani (IND)	GR

== Results ==
Rank	Athlete	Nation	Group	Body weight	Snatch (kg)				Clean & Jerk (kg)				Total
Rank	Athlete	Nation	Group	Body weight	1	2	3	Result	1	2	3	Result	Total
1st place, gold medalist(s)	Geeta Rani	India	A	103.25	95	100	104	104	123	130	137	137	241
2nd place, silver medalist(s)	Simple Kaur	India	A	97.07	97	101	105	105	~~128~~	128	135	135	240
3rd place, bronze medalist(s)	Keisha-Dean Soffe	New Zealand	A	127.68	94	97	100	100	120	124	~~127~~	124	224
4	Sheeva Peo	Nauru	A	105.08	85	~~90~~	95	95	110	120	~~129~~	120	215
5	Sioe Haioti	Niue	A	100.75	85	90	93	93	121	~~131~~	~~131~~	121	214
6	Ivy Shaw	Fiji	A	92.32	91	~~95~~	95	95	115	~~120~~	~~125~~	115	210
7	Kefilini Tualau	Tonga	A	139.52	90	95	~~100~~	95	~~115~~	~~115~~	115	115	210
8	Narita Viliamu	Niue	A	132.25	77	85	88	88	107	114	~~118~~	114	202
9	Ele Opeloge	Samoa	A	96.60	75	80	85	85	100	~~110~~	~~110~~	100	185
10	Shalinee Valaydon	Mauritius	A	82.99	55	60	~~63~~	60	70	~~75~~	~~75~~	70	130
11	Moitheri Phoba	Lesotho	A	78.99	35	~~40~~	~~40~~	35	40	~~45~~	45	45	80
