= Weightlifting at the 2006 Commonwealth Games – Men's 77 kg =

Weightlifting – Men's 77 kg at the 2006 Commonwealth Games
- Venue: Melbourne Exhibition Centre
- Dates: 19 March 2006
- Competitors: 13 from 12 nations
- Winning total weight: 309

Medalists
gold medal	Majeti Fetrie	Ghana
silver medal	Mohammed Asdullah	India
bronze medal	Muhammad Irfan	Pakistan

The Men's 77 kg weightlifting event at the 2006 Commonwealth Games took place at the Melbourne Exhibition Centre on 19 March 2006. The weightlifter from Ghana won the gold, lifting a total weight of 309 kg. India won the silver and Pakistan the bronze medal.

== Schedule ==
All times are Australian Eastern Standard Time (UTC+10)

Date	Time	Event
19 March 2006	14:00	Group A

== Records ==
Prior to this competition, the existing world, Commonwealth and Games records were as follows:

World record	Snatch	Sergey Filimonov (KAZ)	173 kg	Almaty, Kazakhstan	9 April 2004
World record	Clean & Jerk	Oleg Perepetchenov (RUS)	210 kg	Trenčín, Slovakia	27 April 2001
World record	Total	Plamen Zhelyazkov (BUL)	377 kg	Doha, Qatar	27 March 2002
Commonwealth record	Snatch	Yukio Peter (NRU)	156 kg	Sigatoka, Fiji	9 November 2005
Commonwealth record	Clean & Jerk				
Commonwealth record	Total	Yukio Peter (NRU)	350 kg	Sigatoka, Fiji	9 November 2005
Games record	Snatch	Satheesha Rai (IND)	147 kg	Kuala Lumpur, Malaysia	17 September 1998
Games record	Clean & Jerk	Damian Brown (AUS)	187 kg	Kuala Lumpur, Malaysia	17 September 1998
Games record	Total	Damian Brown (AUS)	327 kg	Kuala Lumpur, Malaysia	17 September 1998

== Results ==
Rank	Athlete	Nation	Group	Body weight	Snatch (kg)				Clean & Jerk (kg)				Total
Rank	Athlete	Nation	Group	Body weight	1	2	3	Result	1	2	3	Result	Total
1st place, gold medalist(s)	Majeti Fetrie	Ghana	A	76.20	130	135	138	138	168	171	~~175~~	171	309
2nd place, silver medalist(s)	Mohammed Asdullah	India	A	76.95	130	~~134~~	134	134	~~167~~	167	~~176~~	167	301
3rd place, bronze medalist(s)	Muhammad Irfan	Pakistan	A	75.45	130	135	137	137	~~162~~	162	~~166~~	162	299
4	Richie Patterson	New Zealand	A	76.63	128	135	~~138~~	135	158	~~166~~	~~166~~	158	293
5	Faavae Faauliuli	Samoa	A	76.49	120	~~125~~	126	126	152	157	~~168~~	157	283
6	David Katoatau	Kiribati	A	76.18	115	120	~~122~~	120	147	155	~~160~~	155	275
7	Dayan Nawendra	Sri Lanka	A	75.16	110	~~115~~	~~115~~	110	140	146	~~151~~	146	256
8	Dhanushka Nicholas	Sri Lanka	A	76.71	110	~~117~~	~~122~~	110	140	146	~~151~~	146	256
9	Jack Odongo	Kenya	A	76.31	106	110	115	115	140	~~145~~	~~147~~	140	255
10	Kelepulu Makahili	Tonga	A	76.26	100	105	~~110~~	105	~~130~~	130	135	135	240
11	Linda Matsebula	Swaziland	A	76.85	92	95	98	98	~~120~~	120	122	122	220
12	Lebohang Ratsiu	Lesotho	A	75.62	50	55	60	60	65	70	~~75~~	70	130
–	Yukio Peter	Nauru	A	76.66	~~140~~	~~140~~	~~140~~	–	–	–	–	–	–
