= Reanna Solomon =

Nauruan weightlifter (1981–2022)

- Solomon lifting weights

Personal information
- Full name: Reanna Maricha Solomon
- Born: 16 December 1981 Meneng, Nauru
- Died: 1 July 2022 (aged 40) Denigomodu, Nauru
- Height: 165 cm (5 ft 5 in)
- Weight: 137 kg (302 lb) (in 2002)

Sport
- Country: Nauru
- Sport: Weightlifting
- Event: +75 kg
Medal record
Women's weightlifting
Representing Nauru
Commonwealth Games
Gold medal – first place	2002 Manchester	+75 kg clean & jerk
Gold medal – first place	2002 Manchester	+75 kg total
Bronze medal – third place	2002 Manchester	+75 kg snatch
South Pacific Games
Gold medal – first place	2003 Suva	+75 kg clean & jerk
Gold medal – first place	2003 Suva	+75 kg total
Silver medal – second place	2003 Suva	+75 kg snatch

Reanna Maricha Solomon (16 December 1981 – 1 July 2022) was a Nauruan weightlifter who competed in the women's super-heavyweight (+75 kg) category. At the 2002 Commonwealth Games in Manchester, where women's weightlifting was contested for the first time, she won gold medals in the clean and jerk and the total and a bronze medal in the snatch, setting Games records in the clean and jerk and total. As of 2022 she was the only woman from Nauru to have won a Commonwealth Games title.

Solomon won two gold medals and a silver medal at the 2003 South Pacific Games and represented Nauru at the 2004 Summer Olympics in Athens, where she placed 11th. She retired from competition after the Olympics. She died of COVID-19 on 1 July 2022, the first recorded COVID-related death in Nauru.

== Biography ==
=== Early life and career ===
Reanna Maricha Solomon was born on 16 December 1981 in Meneng, Nauru. She took up weightlifting in the 1990s. She made her World Weightlifting Championships debut at the 1998 edition in Lahti, where she placed 16th and last in the +75 kg category with a total of 180 kg (400 lb).

In 1999 Solomon placed sixth at the Junior World Weightlifting Championships and 20th at the senior World Championships in Athens, lifting a total of 192.5 kg (424 lb) at both events. In March 2000 she finished fourth at the Olympic test event in Sydney with 190 kg (420 lb). Later that year, she placed sixth at the Junior World Championships in Prague, improving her total to 205 kg (452 lb).

=== Commonwealth Games ===
Women's weightlifting was held at the Commonwealth Games for the first time in 2002 in Manchester. Solomon, who was coached by Paul Coffa, competed in the +75 kg category on 3 August. In the snatch she lifted 100 kg (220 lb), the same weight as Australia's Caroline Pileggi and New Zealand's Olivia Baker. The placing was decided on bodyweight, and Solomon, who at 137 kg (302 lb) was the heaviest of the three, received the bronze medal.

In the clean and jerk Solomon lifted 127.5 kg (281 lb) on her second attempt. Pileggi then attempted 127.5 kg (281 lb) and 130 kg (290 lb) but failed both lifts. Solomon won the gold medal in the clean and jerk and a second gold medal for the combined total of 227.5 kg (502 lb), ahead of Pileggi's 225 kg (496 lb). Her clean and jerk and total were Games records. These records stood until the 2006 Commonwealth Games in Melbourne, where they were broken by India's Simple Kaur and Geeta Rani.

=== 2003 South Pacific Games and 2004 Olympics ===
By 2003 Solomon was training at the Oceania Weightlifting Institute in Sigatoka, Fiji. At the 2003 South Pacific Games in Suva, she won gold medals in the clean and jerk and the total and a silver medal in the snatch in the women's super-heavyweight category. She lifted 87.5 kg (193 lb) in the snatch and 110 kg (240 lb) in the clean and jerk for a total of 197.5 kg (435 lb). The snatch gold medal in the same category was won by another Nauruan, Rosetta Detenamo. In October 2003 Solomon was named in the Oceania team for the World Championships in Vancouver. She placed 21st there with a total of 217.5 kg (480 lb). In 2004, she won the Oceania senior championships in Suva with a total of 227.5 kg (502 lb), finishing ahead of New Zealand's Keisha-Dean Soffe.

Solomon was one of three athletes, all weightlifters, who represented Nauru at the 2004 Summer Olympics in Athens; the others were Yukio Peter and Itte Detenamo. She lifted 95 kg (209 lb) in the snatch and 125 kg (276 lb) in the clean and jerk for a total of 220 kg (490 lb), placing 11th in the women's +75 kg category. (Note: Some later sources, including the Oceania Weightlifting Federation's obituary and the Agence France-Presse report of her death, give her Olympic placing as 10th. The International Weightlifting Federation's results, Olympedia and contemporary press reports give 11th.) She retired from competition after the Olympics.

=== Death and legacy ===
Solomon died of COVID-19 on 1 July 2022 in Denigomodu, at the age of 40. Her death was the first in Nauru to be caused by COVID-19; in that month the country had more than 4,100 active cases in a population of fewer than 11,000. President Lionel Aingimea had announced on 1 July that the first person in Nauru had died with COVID-19, without naming her. Aingimea offered his condolences to her family.

The Oceania Weightlifting Federation released a statement in tribute to her, saying that she was "a great athlete, [and] a devoted mother and wife". Solomon and her husband, Tavita, had five children.

At the time of her death, Solomon was the only woman from Nauru to have won a Commonwealth Games gold medal. Paul Coffa, general secretary of the Commonwealth Weightlifting Federation, described her as "a superb athlete, naturally strong". Marcus Stephen, the president of the Nauru Weightlifting Federation and a former President of Nauru, said that she had "set the standard for our female lifters to follow".

At the 2022 Commonwealth Games in Birmingham, Nauruan weightlifter Maximina Uepa dedicated her bronze medal to Solomon.

== Major results ==
Results in the women's +75 kg category
Competition	Venue	Rank	Snatch (kg)	Clean & jerk (kg)	Total (kg)
1998 World Weightlifting Championships	Lahti	16	75	105	180
1999 Junior World Weightlifting Championships	Savannah	6	80	112.5	192.5
1999 World Weightlifting Championships	Athens	20	80	112.5	192.5
2000 Olympic test event	Sydney	4	85	105	190
2000 Junior World Weightlifting Championships	Prague	6	90	115	205
2002 Commonwealth Games	Manchester	1st place, gold medalist(s)	100 ( (bronze) )	127.5 ( (gold) )	227.5
2003 South Pacific Games	Suva	1st place, gold medalist(s)	87.5 ( (silver) )	110 ( (gold) )	197.5
2003 World Weightlifting Championships	Vancouver	21	95	122.5	217.5
2004 Oceania Weightlifting Championships	Suva	1st place, gold medalist(s)	—	—	227.5
2004 Summer Olympics	Athens	11	95	125	220
