= Events at the 2006 Commonwealth Games =

Events in 2006 Commonwealth Games

The following events took place at the 2006 Commonwealth Games.

== Events ==
Sport	Discipline	Event	Class	Scheduled Time of Final	
Sport	Discipline	Event	Class	Local	GMT
Aquatics	Diving	1 m Springboard	Men	Wed 22 19:07	Wed 22 08:07
Aquatics	Diving	1 m Springboard	Women	Fri 24 19:07	Fri 24 08:07
Aquatics	Diving	3 m Springboard	Men	Thu 23 19:07	Thu 23 08:07
Aquatics	Diving	3 m Springboard	Women	Sat 25 19:07	Sat 25 08:07
Aquatics	Diving	10 m Platform	Men	Sat 25 20:30	Sat 25 09:30
Aquatics	Diving	10 m Platform	Women	Thu 23 20:44	Thu 23 09:44
Aquatics	Diving	3 m Synchronised Springboard	Men	Fri 24 20:30	Fri 24 09:30
Aquatics	Diving	3 m Synchronised Springboard	Women	Wed 22 11:21	Wed 22 00:21
Aquatics	Diving	10 m Synchronised Platform	Men	Fri 24 11:19	Fri 24 00:19
Aquatics	Diving	10 m Synchronised Platform	Women	Wed 22 20:38	Wed 22 09:38
Aquatics	Swimming	Freestyle 50 m	Men	TBC	TBC
Aquatics	Swimming	Freestyle 50 m	Men EAD	Sat 18 19:46	Sat 18 08:46
Aquatics	Swimming	Freestyle 50 m	Women	TBC	TBC
Aquatics	Swimming	Freestyle 50 m	Women EAD	Fri 17 19:50	Fri 17 08:50
Aquatics	Swimming	Freestyle 100 m	Men	TBC	TBC
Aquatics	Swimming	Freestyle 100 m	Men EAD	Mon 20 20:42	Mon 20 09:42
Aquatics	Swimming	Freestyle 100 m	Women	TBC	TBC
Aquatics	Swimming	Freestyle 100 m	Women EAD	Sun 19 20:09	Sun 19 09:09
Aquatics	Swimming	Freestyle 200 m	Men	TBC	TBC
Aquatics	Swimming	Freestyle 200 m	Women	TBC	TBC
Aquatics	Swimming	Freestyle 400 m	Men	TBC	TBC
Aquatics	Swimming	Freestyle 400 m	Women	TBC	TBC
Aquatics	Swimming	Freestyle 800 m	Women	TBC	TBC
Aquatics	Swimming	Freestyle 1500 m	Men	TBC	TBC
Aquatics	Swimming	Freestyle 4 x 100 m Relay	Men	TBC	TBC
Aquatics	Swimming	Freestyle 4 x 100 m Relay	Women	TBC	TBC
Aquatics	Swimming	Freestyle 4 x 200 m Relay	Men	TBC	TBC
Aquatics	Swimming	Freestyle 4 x 200 m Relay	Women	TBC	TBC
Aquatics	Swimming	Breaststroke 50 m	Men	TBC	TBC
Aquatics	Swimming	Breaststroke 50 m	Women	TBC	TBC
Aquatics	Swimming	Breaststroke 100 m	Men	TBC	TBC
Aquatics	Swimming	Breaststroke 100 m	Women	TBC	TBC
Aquatics	Swimming	Breaststroke 200 m	Men	TBC	TBC
Aquatics	Swimming	Breaststroke 200 m	Women	TBC	TBC
Aquatics	Swimming	Butterfly 50 m	Men	TBC	TBC
Aquatics	Swimming	Butterfly 50 m	Women	TBC	TBC
Aquatics	Swimming	Butterfly 100 m	Men	TBC	TBC
Aquatics	Swimming	Butterfly 100 m	Women	TBC	TBC
Aquatics	Swimming	Butterfly 200 m	Men	TBC	TBC
Aquatics	Swimming	Butterfly 200 m	Women	TBC	TBC
Aquatics	Swimming	Backstroke 50 m	Men	TBC	TBC
Aquatics	Swimming	Backstroke 50 m	Women	TBC	TBC
Aquatics	Swimming	Backstroke 100 m	Men	TBC	TBC
Aquatics	Swimming	Backstroke 100 m	Women	TBC	TBC
Aquatics	Swimming	Backstroke 200 m	Men	TBC	TBC
Aquatics	Swimming	Backstroke 200 m	Women	TBC	TBC
Aquatics	Swimming	Individual Medley 200 m	Men	TBC	TBC
Aquatics	Swimming	Individual Medley 200 m	Women	TBC	TBC
Aquatics	Swimming	Individual Medley 400 m	Men	TBC	TBC
Aquatics	Swimming	Individual Medley 400 m	Women	TBC	TBC
Aquatics	Swimming	Medley 4 x 100 m Relay	Men	TBC	TBC
Aquatics	Swimming	Medley 4 x 100 m Relay	Women	TBC	TBC
Aquatics	Synchronised Swimming	Technical Routine - Solo	Women	Sat 18 14:10	Sat 18 03:10
Aquatics	Synchronised Swimming	Technical Routine - Duet	Women	Sat 18 15:20	Sat 18 04:20
Aquatics	Synchronised Swimming	Free Routine - Solo	Women	Sun 19 14:11	Sun 19 03:11
Aquatics	Synchronised Swimming	Free Routine - Duet	Women	Sun 19 15:29	Sun 19 04:29
Athletics		100 m	Men	Mon 20 21:30	Mon 20 10:30
Athletics		100 m	Men EAD T12	Mon 20 20:05	Mon 20 09:05
Athletics		100 m	Women	Mon 20 21:20	Mon 20 10:20
Athletics		100 m	Women EAD T37	Mon 20 18:40	Mon 20 07:40
Athletics		200 m	Men	Thu 23 21:50	Thu 23 10:50
Athletics		200 m	Men EAD T46	Thu 23 19:32	Thu 23 08:32
Athletics		200 m	Women	Thu 23 21:40	Thu 23 10:40
Athletics		400 m	Men	Wed 22 21:20	Wed 22 10:20
Athletics		400 m	Women	Tue 21 21:40	Tue 21 10:40
Athletics		800 m	Men	Thu 23 20:50	Thu 23 09:50
Athletics		800 m	Women	Fri 24 20:42	Fri 24 09:42
Athletics		800 m	Women EAD T54	Fri 24 18:35	Fri 24 07:35
Athletics		1,500 m	Men	Sat 25 19:30	Sat 25 08:30
Athletics		1,500 m	Women	Tue 21 19:30	Tue 21 08:30
Athletics		5,000 m	Men	Mon 20 21:45	Mon 20 10:45
Athletics		5,000 m	Women	Fri 24 21:35	Fri 24 10:35
Athletics		10,000 m	Men	Sat 25 20:00	Sat 25 09:00
Athletics		10,000 m	Women	Tue 21 20:05	Tue 21 09:05
Athletics		3,000 m Steeplechase	Men	Fri 24 20:23	Fri 24 09:23
Athletics		3,000 m Steeplechase	Women	Wed 22 19:55	Wed 22 08:55
Athletics		100 m Hurdles	Women	Fri 24 19:10	Fri 24 08:10
Athletics		110 m Hurdles	Men	Tue 21 18:50	Tue 21 07:50
Athletics		400 m Hurdles	Men	Thu 23 19:50	Thu 23 08:50
Athletics		400 m Hurdles	Women	Thu 23 21:15	Thu 23 10:15
Athletics		Decathlon	Men	Mon 20 10:05	Sun 19 23:05
Athletics		Heptathlon	Women	Tue 21 10:20	Mon 20 23:20
Athletics		4 x 100 m Relay	Men	Sat 25 19:00	Sat 25 08:00
Athletics		4 x 100 m Relay	Women	Sat 25 18:40	Sat 25 07:40
Athletics		4 x 400 m Relay	Men	Sat 25 21:40	Sat 25 10:40
Athletics		4 x 400 m Relay	Women	Sat 25 21:15	Sat 25 10:15
Athletics		Pole Vault	Men	Fri 24 20:18	Fri 24 09:18
Athletics		Pole Vault	Women	Sat 25 19:00	Sat 25 08:00
Athletics		High Jump	Men	Wed 22 19:15	Wed 22 08:15
Athletics		High Jump	Women	Thu 23 20:10	Thu 23 09:10
Athletics		Long Jump	Men	Wed 22 19:48	Wed 22 08:48
Athletics		Long Jump	Women	Fri 24 19:20	Fri 24 08:20
Athletics		Triple Jump	Men	Sat 25 18:50	Sat 25 07:50
Athletics		Triple Jump	Women	Tue 21 18:40	Tue 21 07:40
Athletics		Shot Put	Men	Mon 20 19:42	Mon 20 08:42
Athletics		Shot Put	Women	Wed 22 20:15	Wed 22 09:15
Athletics		Seated Shot Put	Women EAD	Mon 20 10:00	Sun 19 23:00
Athletics		Hammer	Men	Fri 24 18:30	Fri 24 07:30
Athletics		Hammer	Women	Mon 20 18:35	Mon 20 07:35
Athletics		Discus	Men	Thu 23 20:45	Thu 23 09:45
Athletics		Discus	Women	Tue 21 20:10	Tue 21 09:10
Athletics		Seated Discus	Men EAD	Wed 22 10:00	Tue 21 23:00
Athletics		Javelin	Men	Sat 25 18:30	Sat 25 07:30
Athletics		Javelin	Women	Sun 19 12:30	Sun 19 01:30
Athletics		20 km Walk	Men	Mon 20 12:00	Mon 20 01:00
Athletics		20 km Walk	Women	Mon 20 09:00	Sun 19 22:00
Athletics		50 km Walk	Men	Fri 24 08:00	Thu 23 21:00
Athletics		Marathon	Men	Sun 19 10:15	Sat 18 23:15
Athletics		Marathon	Women	Sun 19 09:30	Sat 18 22:30
Badminton		Singles	Men	Sun 26 10:00	Sat 25 23:00
Badminton		Singles	Women	Sun 26 10:50	Sat 25 23:50
Badminton		Doubles	Men	Sun 26 11:50	Sun 26 00:50
Badminton		Doubles	Women	Sun 26 12:50	Sun 26 01:50
Badminton		Doubles	Mixed	Sun 26 13:50	Sun 26 02:50
Badminton		Team	Mixed	Sun 26 10:00	Sat 25 23:00
Basketball			Men	Fri 24 20:15	Fri 24 09:15
Basketball			Women	Thu 23 20:15	Thu 23 09:15
Boxing		Light Flyweight 48 kg	Men	Sat 25 19:00	Sat 25 08:00
Boxing		Flyweight 51 kg	Men	Sat 25 15:00	Sat 25 04:00
Boxing		Bantamweight 54 kg	Men	Sat 25 19:25	Sat 25 08:25
Boxing		Featherweight 57 kg	Men	Sat 25 15:15	Sat 25 04:15
Boxing		Lightweight 60 kg	Men	Sat 25 19:40	Sat 25 08:40
Boxing		Light Welterweight 64 kg	Men	Sat 25 15:40	Sat 25 04:40
Boxing		Welterweight 69 kg	Men	Sat 25 20:05	Sat 25 09:05
Boxing		Middleweight 75 kg	Men	Sat 25 16:00	Sat 25 05:00
Boxing		Light Heavyweight 81 kg	Men	Sat 25 20:30	Sat 25 09:30
Boxing		Heavyweight 91 kg	Men	Sat 25 16:25	Sat 25 05:25
Boxing		Super Heavyweight 91 kg+	Men	Sat 25 20:55	Sat 25 09:55
Cycling	Track	Sprint	Men	TBC	TBC
Cycling	Track	Sprint	Women	TBC	TBC
Cycling	Track	Team Sprint	Men	TBC	TBC
Cycling	Track	500 m Time Trial	Women	TBC	TBC
Cycling	Track	1,000 m Time Trial	Men	TBC	TBC
Cycling	Track	3,000 m Individual Pursuit	Women	TBC	TBC
Cycling	Track	4,000 m Individual Pursuit	Men	TBC	TBC
Cycling	Track	4,000 m Team Pursuit	Men	TBC	TBC
Cycling	Track	20 km Scratch Race	Men	TBC	TBC
Cycling	Track	25 km Points Race	Women	TBC	TBC
Cycling	Track	40 km Points Race	Men	TBC	TBC
Cycling	Track	Keirin	Men	TBC	TBC
Cycling	Road	25–30 km Time Trial	Women	Fri 21 10:30	Thu 20 23:30
Cycling	Road	30–40 km Time Trial	Men	Fri 21 13:00	Fri 21 02:00
Cycling	Road	100–120 km Road Race	Women	Wed 26 09:00	Tue 25 22:00
Cycling	Road	160–180 km Road Race	Men	Wed 26 13:00	Wed 26 02:00
Cycling	Mountain Bike	Cross Country	Men	Thu 23 14:00	Thu 23 03:00
Cycling	Mountain Bike	Cross Country	Women	Thu 23 10:30	Wed 22 23:30
Gymnastics	Artistic	Artistic Individual All-Around	Men	Sat 18 13:30	Sat 18 02:30
Gymnastics	Artistic	Artistic Individual All-Around	Women	Sat 18 19:00	Sat 18 08:00
Gymnastics	Artistic	Artistic Individual Apparatus - Vault	Men	Tue 21 19:03	Tue 21 08:03
Gymnastics	Artistic	Artistic Individual Apparatus - Vault	Women	Mon 20 19:39	Mon 20 08:39
Gymnastics	Artistic	Artistic Individual Apparatus - Uneven Bars	Women	Mon 20 20:51	Mon 20 09:51
Gymnastics	Artistic	Artistic Individual Apparatus - Balance Beam	Women	Tue 21 19:39	Tue 21 08:39
Gymnastics	Artistic	Artistic Individual Apparatus - Floor	Men	Mon 20 19:03	Mon 20 08:03
Gymnastics	Artistic	Artistic Individual Apparatus - Floor	Women	Tue 21 20:58	Tue 21 09:58
Gymnastics	Artistic	Artistic Individual Apparatus - Parallel Bars	Men	Tue 21 20:20	Tue 21 09:20
Gymnastics	Artistic	Artistic Individual Apparatus - Horizontal Bar	Men	Tue 21 21:39	Tue 21 10:39
Gymnastics	Artistic	Artistic Individual Apparatus - Still Rings	Men	Mon 20 21:27	Mon 20 10:27
Gymnastics	Artistic	Artistic Individual Apparatus - Pommel Horse	Men	Mon 20 20:15	Mon 20 09:15
Gymnastics	Artistic	Artistic Team	Men	Mon 20 19:03	Mon 20 08:03
Gymnastics	Artistic	Artistic Team	Women	Mon 20 19:39	Mon 20 08:39
Gymnastics	Rhythmic	Rhythmic Individual All-Around	Women	Sat 25 12:30	Sat 25 01:30
Gymnastics	Rhythmic	Rhythmic Individual Apparatus - Rope	Women	Sun 26 12:30	Sun 26 01:30
Gymnastics	Rhythmic	Rhythmic Individual Apparatus - Ball	Women	Sun 26 13:18	Sun 26 02:18
Gymnastics	Rhythmic	Rhythmic Individual Apparatus - Clubs	Women	Sun 26 14:00	Sun 26 03:00
Gymnastics	Rhythmic	Rhythmic Individual Apparatus - Ribbon	Women	Sun 26 14:42	Sun 26 03:42
Gymnastics	Rhythmic	Rhythmic Team	Women	Fri 24 18:00	Fri 24 07:00
Field Hockey			Men	Sun 26 13:00	Sun 26 02:00
Field Hockey			Women	Sat 25 13:00	Sat 25 02:00
Lawn Bowls		Singles	Men	Fri 24 19:00	Fri 24 08:00
Lawn Bowls		Singles	Women	Fri 24 17:00	Fri 24 06:00
Lawn Bowls		Pairs	Men	Wed 22 19:00	Wed 22 08:00
Lawn Bowls		Pairs	Women	Wed 22 17:00	Wed 22 06:00
Lawn Bowls		Triples	Men	Mon 20 18:45	Mon 20 07:45
Lawn Bowls		Triples	Women	Mon 20 15:30	Mon 20 04:30
Netball			Women	Sun 26 16:00	Sun 26 05:00
Rugby Sevens			Men	Fri 17 21:52	Fri 17 10:52
Shooting	Clay Target	Trap	Men	Wed 22 10:00	Tue 21 23:00
Shooting	Clay Target	Trap	Women	Tue 21 10:00	Mon 20 23:00
Shooting	Clay Target	Trap Pairs	Men	Fri 17 10:00	Thu 16 23:00
Shooting	Clay Target	Trap Pairs	Women	Fri 17 10:00	Thu 16 23:00
Shooting	Clay Target	Skeet	Men	Sat 25 10:00	Fri 24 23:00
Shooting	Clay Target	Skeet	Women	Fri 24 10:00	Thu 23 23:00
Shooting	Clay Target	Skeet Pairs	Men	Mon 20 10:00	Sun 19 23:00
Shooting	Clay Target	Skeet Pairs	Women	Mon 20 10:00	Sun 19 23:00
Shooting	Clay Target	Double Trap	Men	Thu 23 10:00	Wed 22 23:00
Shooting	Clay Target	Double Trap	Women	Thu 23 10:00	Wed 22 23:00
Shooting	Clay Target	Double Trap Pairs	Men	Sun 19 10:00	Sat 18 23:00
Shooting	Clay Target	Double Trap Pairs	Women	Sun 19 10:00	Sat 18 23:00
Shooting	Pistol	10 m Air Pistol	Men	Wed 22 09:00	Tue 21 22:00
Shooting	Pistol	10 m Air Pistol	Women	Thu 23 09:00	Wed 22 22:00
Shooting	Pistol	10 m Air Pistol Pairs	Men	Sat 18 09:00	Fri 17 22:00
Shooting	Pistol	10 m Air Pistol Pairs	Women	Sun 19 09:00	Sat 18 22:00
Shooting	Pistol	25 m Rapid Fire Pistol	Men	Thu 23 09:00	Wed 22 22:00
Shooting	Pistol	25 m Rapid Fire Pistol Pairs	Men	Sun 19 09:00	Sat 18 22:00
Shooting	Pistol	25 m Pistol	Women	Tue 21 09:00	Mon 20 22:00
Shooting	Pistol	25 m Pistol Pairs	Women	Fri 17 10:00	Thu 16 23:00
Shooting	Pistol	25 m Centre Fire Pistol	Men	Fri 24 09:00	Thu 23 22:00
Shooting	Pistol	25 m Centre Fire Pistol Pairs	Men	Mon 20 09:00	Sun 19 22:00
Shooting	Pistol	25 m Standard Pistol	Men	Sat 25 09:00	Fri 24 22:00
Shooting	Pistol	25 m Standard Pistol Pairs	Men	Sat 18 13:30	Sat 18 02:30
Shooting	Pistol	50 m Pistol	Men	Tue 21 09:00	Mon 20 22:00
Shooting	Pistol	50 m Pistol Pairs	Men	Fri 17 09:00	Thu 16 22:00
Shooting	Small Bore and Air Rifle	10 m Air Rifle	Men	Tue 21 09:00	Mon 20 22:00
Shooting	Small Bore and Air Rifle	10 m Air Rifle	Women	Mon 20 09:00	Sun 19 22:00
Shooting	Small Bore and Air Rifle	10 m Air Rifle Pairs	Men	Fri 17 09:00	Thu 16 22:00
Shooting	Small Bore and Air Rifle	10 m Air Rifle Pairs	Women	Fri 17 11:30	Fri 17 00:30
Shooting	Small Bore and Air Rifle	50 m Rifle 3 Position	Men	Fri 24 09:00	Thu 23 22:00
Shooting	Small Bore and Air Rifle	50 m Rifle 3 Position	Women	Thu 23 09:00	Wed 22 22:00
Shooting	Small Bore and Air Rifle	50 m Rifle 3 Position Pairs	Men	Mon 20 09:00	Sun 19 22:00
Shooting	Small Bore and Air Rifle	50 m Rifle 3 Position Pairs	Women	Sun 19 09:00	Sat 18 22:00
Shooting	Small Bore and Air Rifle	50 m Rifle Prone	Men	Thu 23 15:30	Thu 23 04:30
Shooting	Small Bore and Air Rifle	50 m Rifle Prone	Women	Wed 22 13:00	Wed 22 02:00
Shooting	Small Bore and Air Rifle	50 m Rifle Prone Pairs	Men	Sat 18 11:00	Sat 18 00:00
Shooting	Small Bore and Air Rifle	50 m Rifle Prone Pairs	Women	Sat 18 13:00	Sat 18 02:00
Shooting	Full Bore Rifle	Singles	Open	Thu 23 10:00	Wed 22 23:00
Shooting	Full Bore Rifle	Pairs	Open	Sun 19 10:00	Sat 18 23:00
Squash		Singles	Men	TBC	TBC
Squash		Singles	Women	TBC	TBC
Squash		Doubles	Men	TBC	TBC
Squash		Doubles	Women	Sun 26 11:55	Sun 26 00:55
Squash		Doubles	Mixed	Sun 26 13:50	Sun 26 02:50
Table Tennis		Singles	Men	Sun 26 14:15	Sun 26 03:15
Table Tennis		Singles	Women	Sun 26 12:10	Sun 26 01:10
Table Tennis		Singles	Women EAD	Sun 26 10:30	Sat 25 23:30
Table Tennis		Doubles	Men	Sat 25 20:30	Sat 25 09:30
Table Tennis		Doubles	Women	Sat 25 18:50	Sat 25 07:50
Table Tennis		Doubles	Mixed	Fri 24 20:15	Fri 24 09:15
Table Tennis		Team	Men	Mon 20 18:15	Mon 20 07:15
Table Tennis		Team	Women	Mon 20 16:00	Mon 20 05:00
Triathlon			Men	Sat 18 13:00	Sat 18 02:00
Triathlon			Women	Sat 18 09:00	Fri 17 22:00
Weightlifting		48 kg category	Women	Thu 16 14:00	Thu 16 03:00
Weightlifting		53 kg category	Women	Fri 17 18:30	Fri 17 07:30
Weightlifting		56 kg category	Men	Thu 16 18:30	Thu 16 07:30
Weightlifting		58 kg category	Women	Sat 18 14:00	Sat 18 03:00
Weightlifting		62 kg category	Men	Fri 17 10:00	Thu 16 23:00
Weightlifting		63 kg category	Women	Sun 19 18:30	Sun 19 07:30
Weightlifting		69 kg category	Men	Sat 18 18:30	Sat 18 07:30
Weightlifting		69 kg category	Women	Mon 20 14:00	Mon 20 03:00
Weightlifting		75 kg category	Women	Tue 21 18:30	Tue 21 07:30
Weightlifting		75 kg+ category	Women	Wed 22 14:00	Wed 22 03:00
Weightlifting		77 kg category	Men	Sun 19 14:00	Sun 19 03:00
Weightlifting		85 kg category	Men	Mon 20 18:30	Mon 20 07:30
Weightlifting		94 kg category	Men	Tue 21 14:00	Tue 21 03:00
Weightlifting		105 kg category	Men	Wed 22 18:30	Wed 22 07:30
Weightlifting		105 kg+ category	Men	Thu 23 18:30	Thu 23 07:30
Weightlifting		Open Powerlifting	Men EAD	Fri 24 14:00	Fri 24 03:00
