= Irene Ajambo =

Ugandan weightlifter

Personal information
- Full name: Irene Ajambo
- Born: 27 July 1987 (age 39)
- Height: 163 cm (5 ft 4 in)
- Weight: 68.45 kg (150.9 lb)

Sport
- Country: Uganda
- Sport: Weightlifting
- Weight class: 69 kg
- Team: National team
- Updated on 13 September 2016

Irene Ajambo (born 27 July 1987) is a Ugandan female weightlifter, competing in the 69 kg category and representing Uganda at international competitions.

She participated at the 2004 Summer Olympics in the 69 kg event. She competed at world championships, most recently at the 2005 World Weightlifting Championships.

== Major results ==
Year	Venue	Weight	Snatch (kg)				Clean & Jerk (kg)				Total	Rank
Year	Venue	Weight	1	2	3	Rank	1	2	3	Rank	Total	Rank
Olympic Games
2004	Athens, Greece	69 kg	65	~~70~~	~~70~~	10	80	85	90	9	150	9
World Championships
2005	Doha, Qatar	69 kg	65	~~70~~	~~70~~	13	85	90	~~93~~	12	155	12
Commonwealth Games
2006	Melbourne, Australia	69 kg	65	~~70~~	70	6	90	~~93~~	~~93~~	6	160	6
