= Vendula Frintová =

Czech triathlete

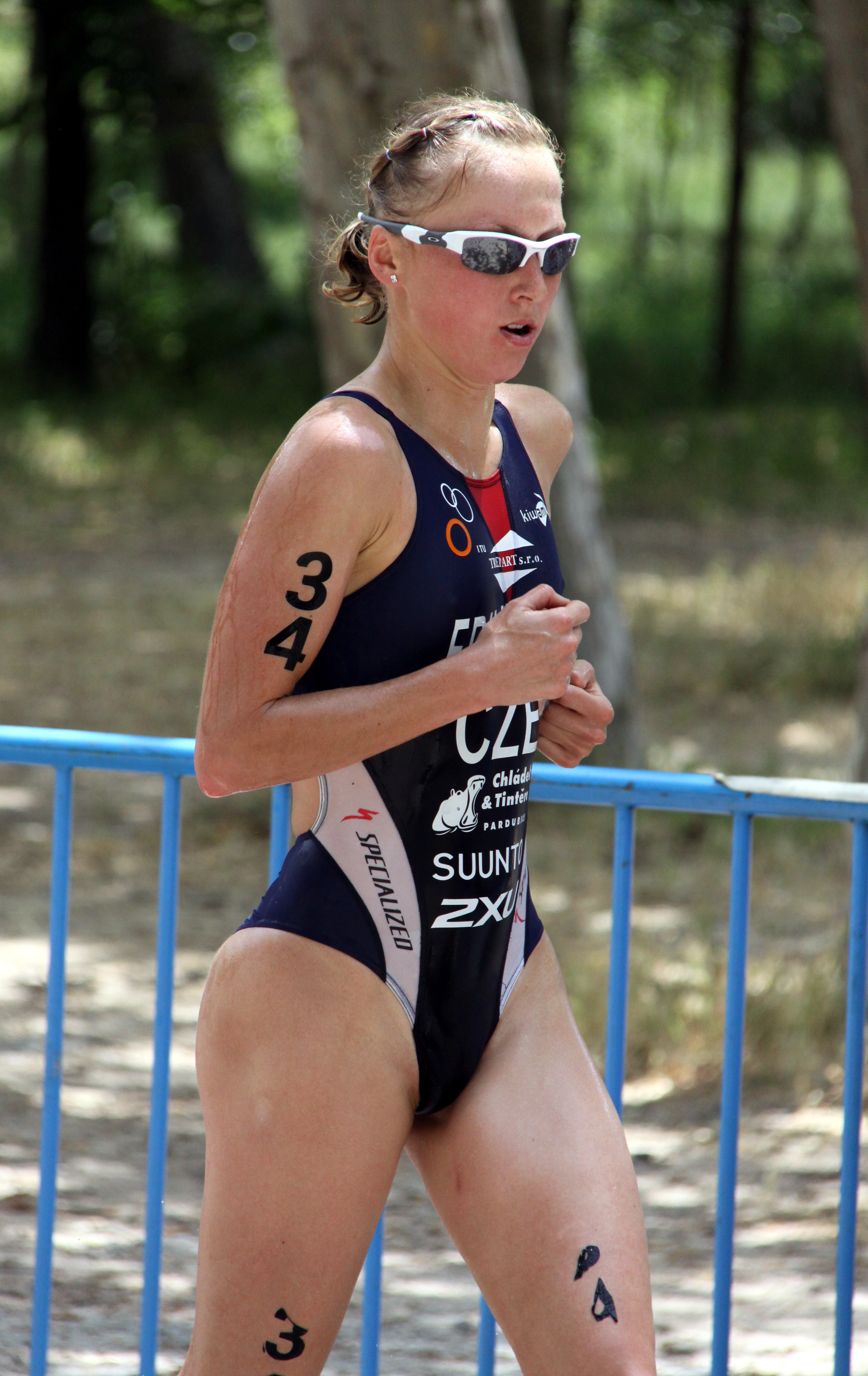
Frintová in the heat of the World Championship Series triathlon in Madrid, 2010

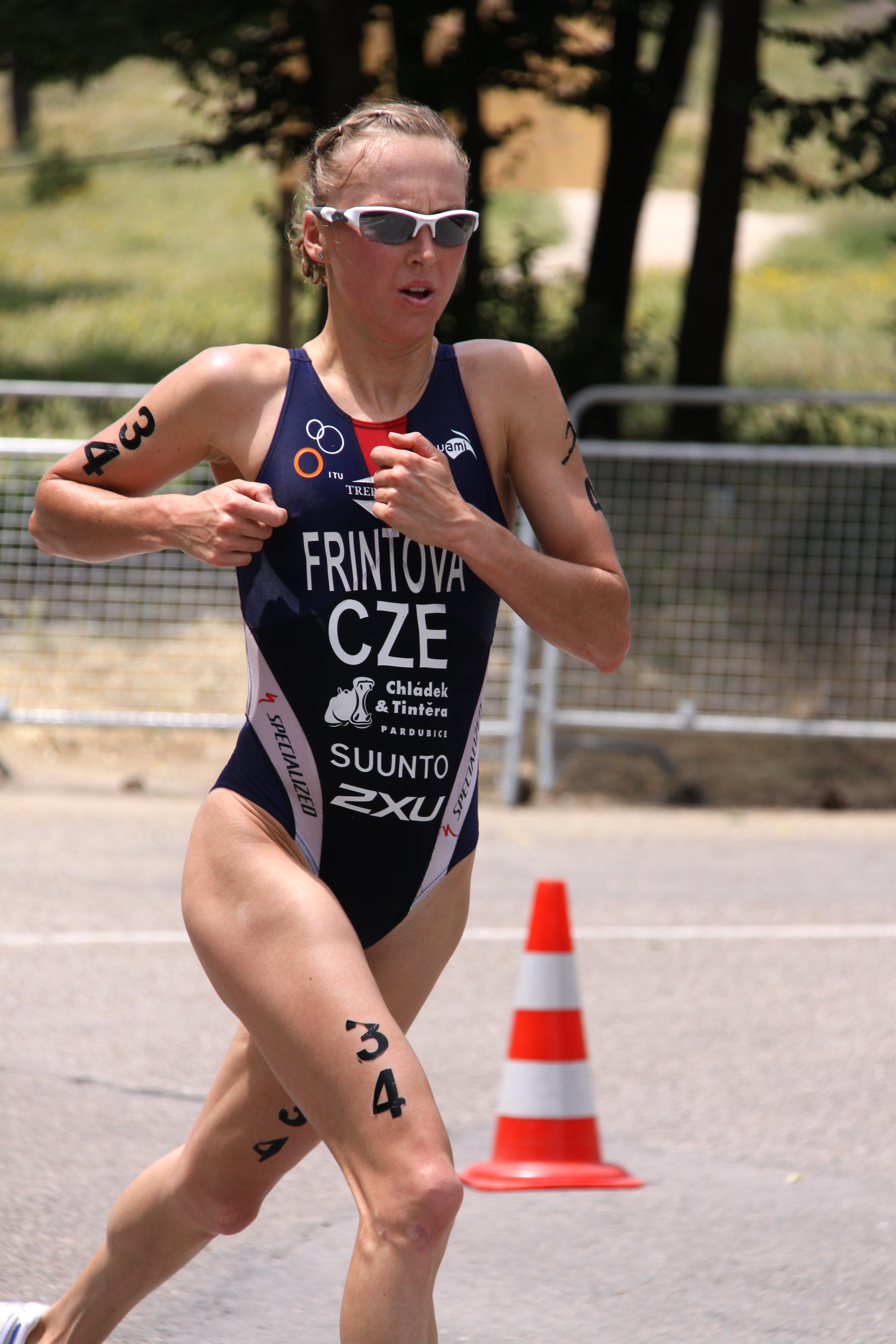
Frintová placing 19th at the World Championship Series triathlon in Madrid, 2010

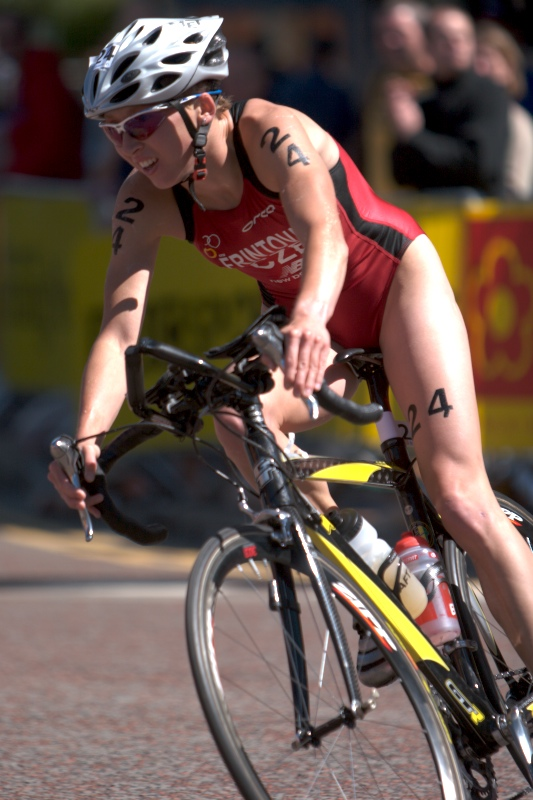
Frintová at the Salford Triathlon, 2007

Vendula Frintová (Czech pronunciation: [ˈvɛndula ˈfrɪntovaː]; born 4 September 1983) is a Czech triathlete. She is multiple Czech Champion in various categories such as National Champion of the years 2006 and 2007 and winner of the National Championship Series of the year 2009, Duathlon World Champion of the year 2009, and gold medalist of the World Cup in Mooloolaba 2010.

== Biography ==
Frintová was born on 4 September 1983 in Náchod, Czechoslovakia.

In the eight years from 2002 to 2009, Vendula Frintová took part in 75 ITU competitions and achieved 37 top ten positions, among which five gold medals.

In her home country, Vendula Frintová represents the Ekol Elite Triathlon Team, and in 2010, again, she also takes part, as an elite guest star, in prestigious German and French circuits, i.e. the German Bundesliga, representing Krefelder Kanu Klub, and the French Club Championship Series Lyonnaise des Eaux, representing TCG 79 Parthenay. At the opening triathlon of this Grand Prix de Triathlon, Frintová placed 17th, and at the second Lyonnaise des Eaux triathlon in Beauvais she placed 26th, both times being among the three triathlètes classants l'équipe, the best triathletes of the club, and TCG 79 Parthenay, which had only four instead of five triathletes, all of whom foreign guest stars, placed 5th again.

Vendula Frintová holds a degree in anthropology and genetics (Charles University, Prague) and, when in the Czech Republic, she lives in her home town Náchod.

== ITU Competitions ==
In the nine years from 2002 to 2010, Frintová took part in 81 ITU competitions and achieved 36 top ten positions, among which 19 medals. The list is based upon the official ITU rankings and the Athlete's Profile Page, which, however, is not complete. Unless indicated otherwise, the following events are triathlons (Olympic Distance) and belong to the Elite category.

Date	Competition	Place	Rank
2002-07-06	European Championships (Junior)	Győr	27
2003-05-31	European Cup	Brno	3
2003-06-21	European Championships	Carlsbad	DNS
2003-03-27	World Cup	Salford	27
2003-08-03	World Cup	Tiszaújváros	39
2003-08-16	European Cup	Prague	2
2003-09-06	World Cup	Hamburg	DNF
2003-09-12	World Cup	Nice	24
2003-09-21	World Cup	Madrid	21
2003-11-23	World Cup	Geelong	DNF
2004-04-18	European Championships	Valencia	DNF
2004-05-09	World Championships (U23)	Madeira	2
2004-06-12	World Cup	Tongyeong	5
2004-07-10	European Cup	Echternach	2
2004-09-04	World Cup	Hamburg	8
2004-09-19	World Cup	Madrid	4
2004-11-07	World Cup	Rio de Janeiro	6
2005-06-05	World Cup	Madrid	DNF
2005-07-17	European Championships (U23)	Sofia	4
2005-07-31	World Cup	Salford	DNF
2005-08-06	World Cup	Hamburg	4
2005-08-20	European Championships	Lausanne	23
2005-09-10	World Championships (U23)	Gamagori	2
2005-09-17	OSIM World Cup	Beijing	DNF
2005-10-15	European Cup	Palermo	5
2005-11-13	World Cup	New Plymouth	7
2006-04-23	European Cup	Estoril	4
2006-06-04	BG World Cup	Madrid	9
2006-06-11	BG World Cup	Richards Bay	3
2006-06-23	European Championships	Autun	DNF
2006-07-01	Premium European Cup	Kitzbühel	DNS
2006-07-08	European Championships (U23)	Rijeka	11
2006-07-09	BG World Cup	Edmonton	DNS
2006-07-30	BG World Cup	Salford	9
2006-08-13	BG World Cup	Tiszaújváros	28
2006-09-02	World Championships	Lausanne	28
2006-09-09	BG World Cup	Hamburg	24
2006-09-24	BG World Cup	Beijing	DNS
2006-10-07	Duathlon European Championships	Rimini	3
2006-11-05	BG World Cup	Cancun	22
2006-11-12	BG World Cup	New Plymouth	DNF
2007-05-06	BG World Cup	Lisbon	10
2007-05-13	BG World Cup	Richards Bay	DNF
2007-06-17	BG World Cup	Des Moines	DNF
2007-06-29	European Championships	Copenhagen	DNF
2007-07-07	Premium European Cup	Holten	3
2007-07-22	BG World Cup	Kitzbühel	15
2007-07-29	BG World Cup	Salford	DNF
2007-08-30	BG World Championships	Hamburg	DNF
2007-09-15	BG World Cup	Beijing	34
2007-09-23	Asian Cup	Hong Kong	3
2007-10-07	BG World Cup	Rhodes	3
2008-04-26	BG World Cup	Tongyeong	3
2008-05-10	European Championships	Lisbon	DNS
2008-05-18	European Cup	Brno	DNF
2008-06-05	BG World Championships	Vancouver	36
2008-06-21	European Cup	Schliersee	DNF
2008-06-28	Premium European Cup	Holten	3
2008-07-05	BG World Cup	Hamburg	DNS
2008-07-13	BG World Cup	Tiszaújváros	6
2008-08-18	Olympic Games	Beijing	23
2008-09-07	Premium European Cup	Kędzierzyn-Koźle	1
2008-09-27	BG World Cup	Lorient	DNF
2008-10-26	BG World Cup	Huatulco	7
2008-11-15	Asian Cup	Hong Kong	3
2008-11-16	ASTC Aquathlon Asian Championships	Golden Beach	2
2009-05-02	Dextro Energy World Championship Series	Tongyeong	9
2009-05-31	Dextro Energy World Championship Series	Madrid	15
2009-06-21	Dextro Energy World Championship Series	Washington, D.C.	DNF
2009-07-02	European Championships	Holten	22
2009-07-11	Dextro Energy World Championship Series	Kitzbühel	9
2009-07-18	European Cup	Brno	6
2009-07-25	Dextro Energy World Championship Series	Hamburg	DNF
2009-08-15	Dextro Energy World Championship Series	London	42
2009-08-30	Premium European Cup	Kędzierzyn-Koźle	1
2009-09-09	Dextro Energy World Championship Series, Grand Final	Gold Coast	18
2009-09-26	Duathlon World Championships	Concord	1
2009-10-17	Premium Asian Cup	Hong Kong	1
2009-10-25	Premium European Cup	Alanya	DNF
2010-03-27	World Cup	Mooloolaba	1
2010-04-11	Dextro Energy World Championship Series	Sydney	DNF
2010-05-08	Dextro Energy World Championship Series	Seoul	DNF
2010-06-05	Dextro Energy World Championship Series	Madrid	19
2010-07-03	European Championships	Athlone	11
2010-07-17	Dextro Energy World Championship Series	Hamburg	DNF
2010-07-24	Dextro Energy World Championship Series	London	DNF
2010-08-21	Sprint World Championships	Lausanne	34

BG = the sponsor British Gas · DNF = did not finish · DNS = did not start
