= Weightlifting at the 2006 Commonwealth Games – Women's 58 kg =

Weightlifting competition

Weightlifting – Women's 58 kg at the 2006 Commonwealth Games
- Venue: Melbourne Exhibition Centre
- Dates: 18 March 2006
- Competitors: 10 from 9 nations
- Winning total weight: 185

Medalists
gold medal	Yumnam Chanu	India
silver medal	Emily Quarton	Canada
bronze medal	Natasha Barker	Australia

The Women's 58 kg weightlifting event at the 2006 Commonwealth Games took place at the Melbourne Exhibition Centre on 18 March 2006. The weightlifter from India won the gold, lifting a total weight of 185 kg.

== Schedule ==
All times are Australian Eastern Standard Time (UTC+10)

Date	Time	Event
18 March 2006	14:00	Group A

== Records ==
Prior to this competition, the existing world, Commonwealth and Games records were as follows:

World record	Snatch	Wang Li (CHN)	110 kg	Bali, Indonesia	10 August 2003
World record	Clean & Jerk	Gu Wei (CHN)	139 kg	Doha, Qatar	10 November 2005
World record	Total	Gu Wei (CHN)	241 kg	Doha, Qatar	10 November 2005
Commonwealth record	Snatch				
Commonwealth record	Clean & Jerk	Maryse Turcotte (CAN)	120 kg	Vancouver, Canada	20 May 2000
Commonwealth record	Total	Michaela Breeze (WAL)	212 kg	Kyiv, Ukraine	21 April 2004
Games record	Snatch	Maryse Turcotte (CAN)	87 kg	Manchester, Great Britain	31 July 2002
Games record	Clean & Jerk	Maryse Turcotte (CAN)	115 kg	Manchester, Great Britain	31 July 2002
Games record	Total	Maryse Turcotte (CAN)	202 kg	Manchester, Great Britain	31 July 2002

== Results ==
Rank	Athlete	Nation	Group	Body weight	Snatch (kg)				Clean & Jerk (kg)				Total
Rank	Athlete	Nation	Group	Body weight	1	2	3	Result	1	2	3	Result	Total
1st place, gold medalist(s)	Yumnam Chanu	India	A	57.56	77	79	80	80	96	100	105	105	185
2nd place, silver medalist(s)	Emily Quarton	Canada	A	57.88	~~80~~	~~80~~	77	77	98	~~101~~	101	101	178
3rd place, bronze medalist(s)	Natasha Barker	Australia	A	57.91	77	79	80	80	95	98	~~100~~	98	178
4	Rita Kari	Papua New Guinea	A	57.27	72	76	78	78	~~94~~	94	99	99	177
5	Mona Pretorius	South Africa	A	57.82	67	71	75	75	87	91	95	95	170
6	Hélène Miyenga	Cameroon	A	57.69	72	~~76~~	~~76~~	72	81	~~90~~	~~90~~	81	153
7	Nadini Gunasekara	Sri Lanka	A	57.89	~~68~~	68	~~71~~	68	85	~~90~~	~~90~~	85	153
8	Joanne Savastio	England	A	57.39	63	~~66~~	~~66~~	63	80	~~83~~	~~83~~	80	143
–	Jacqueline White	Australia	A	57.57	77	~~79~~	~~79~~	77	~~94~~	~~94~~	~~94~~	–	–
–	Jacinta Moli Willie	Solomon Islands	A	57.80	~~70~~	~~70~~	~~70~~	–	–	–	–	–	–
