= Seychelles at the 2006 Commonwealth Games =

2006 Sports Event with 32 commonwealth members

Flag of Seychelles

The Seychelles was represented at the 2006 Commonwealth Games in Melbourne by a 32-member strong contingent comprising 22 sportspersons and 10 officials. The 2006 event was the fifth time the nation has entered the Commonwealth Games, previously having won three medals – two silver and one bronze. The Seychelles team competed in seven of the 16 sporting disciplines at the Games, including athletics, boxing, weightlifting, badminton, table tennis, swimming and cycling. Reigning Seychelles Sportslady of the Year, javelin specialist Lindy Leveau-Agricole was chosen to be the team's flag bearer during the opening ceremony.

Weightlifter Janet Thelermont became the Seychelles' first medal winner of the Games, taking a bronze in the Women's 69 kg class after lifting 205 kg (95 kg snatch, 110 kg clean and jerk). This result made her only the fourth Seychellois to win a Commonwealth Games medal, and the first outside of boxing. Four days later, France-based athlete Céline Laporte became the nation's second medallist, taking bronze in the women's long jump with a 6.57 metre leap, 25 centimetres further than her personal best before the Games, and was equal to that of Australian silver medallist Kerrie Taurima.

== Medals ==
	(gold)	(silver)	(bronze)	Total
Seychelles	0	0	2	2

=== Bronze ===
1. Janet Marie Thelermont, Weightlifting, Women's 69 kg
2. Céline Laporte, Women's long jump
