= Weightlifting at the 2002 Commonwealth Games – Women's +75 kg =

Weightlifting – Women's +75 kg at the 2002 Commonwealth Games
- Venue: Manchester International Convention Centre
- Dates: 2 August 2002
- Competitors: 8 from 7 nations
- Winning total weight: 227.5

Medalists
gold medal	Reanna Solomon	Nauru
silver medal	Caroline Pileggi	Australia
bronze medal	Olivia Baker	New Zealand

The Women's +75 kg weightlifting event at the 2002 Commonwealth Games took place at the Manchester International Convention Centre on 3 August 2002. The weightlifter from Nauru won the gold, lifting a total weight of 227.5 kg.

== Schedule ==
All times are Coordinated Universal Time (UTC)

Date	Time	Event
3 August 2002	15:00	Group A

== Records ==
Prior to this competition, the existing world, Commonwealth and Games records were as follows:

World record	Snatch	Ding Meiyuan (CHN)	135.0 kg	Sydney, Australia	22 September 2000
World record	Clean & Jerk	Ding Meiyuan (CHN)	165.0 kg	Sydney, Australia	22 September 2000
World record	Total	Ding Meiyuan (CHN)	300.0 kg	Sydney, Australia	22 September 2000
Commonwealth record	Snatch				
Commonwealth record	Clean & Jerk				
Commonwealth record	Total				
Games record	Snatch	First time held			
Games record	Clean & Jerk	First time held			
Games record	Total	First time held			

The following records were established during the competition:

Snatch	100.0 kg	Olivia Baker (NZL)	GR
Clean & Jerk	127.5 kg	Reanna Solomon (NRU)	GR
Total	227.5 kg	Reanna Solomon (NRU)	GR

== Results ==
Rank	Athlete	Nation	Group	Body weight	Snatch (kg)					Clean & Jerk (kg)					Total
Rank	Athlete	Nation	Group	Body weight	1	2	3	Result	Rank	1	2	3	Result	Rank	Total
1st place, gold medalist(s)	Reanna Solomon	Nauru	A	137.07	90.0	95.0	100.0	100.0	3rd place, bronze medalist(s)	~~127.5~~	127.5	~~130.0~~	127.5	1st place, gold medalist(s)	227.5
2nd place, silver medalist(s)	Caroline Pileggi	Australia	A	90.48	95.0	~~100.0~~	100.0	100.0	1st place, gold medalist(s)	125.0	~~127.5~~	~~130.0~~	125.0	2nd place, silver medalist(s)	225.0
3rd place, bronze medalist(s)	Olivia Baker	New Zealand	A	94.24	100.0	~~102.5~~	~~102.5~~	100.0	2nd place, silver medalist(s)	125.0	~~130.0~~	~~130.0~~	125.0	3rd place, bronze medalist(s)	225.0
4	Susanne Dandenault	Canada	A	113.17	~~95.0~~	~~95.0~~	97.5	97.5	5	~~125.0~~	125.0	~~130.0~~	125.0	4	222.5
5	Keisha-Dean Soffe	New Zealand	A	111.72	92.5	~~97.5~~	97.5	97.5	4	112.5	117.5	~~120.0~~	117.5	5	215.0
6	Maggie Lynes	England	A	80.64	~~75.0~~	75.0	~~80.0~~	75.0	6	~~95.0~~	95.0	~~100.0~~	95.0	6	170.0
7	Christina Strovolitou	Cyprus	A	84.32	70.0	75.0	~~77.5~~	75.0	7	90.0	~~95.0~~	95.0	95.0	7	170.0
8	Mana Paola	Niue	A	142.16	52.5	~~55.0~~	55.0	55.0	8	70.0	75.0	~~80.0~~	75.0	8	130.0
