= Weightlifting at the 2006 Commonwealth Games – Women's 69 kg =

Weightlifting – Women's 69 kg at the 2006 Commonwealth Games
- Venue: Melbourne Exhibition Centre
- Dates: 20 March 2006
- Competitors: 7 from 7 nations
- Winning total weight: 229

Medalists
gold medal	Jeane Lassen	Canada
silver medal	Monika Devi	India
bronze medal	Janet Thelermont	Seychelles

The Women's 69 kg weightlifting event at the 2006 Commonwealth Games took place at the Melbourne Exhibition Centre on 20 March 2006. The weightlifter from Canada won the gold, lifting a total weight of 229 kg.

== Schedule ==
All times are Australian Eastern Standard Time (UTC+10)

Date	Time	Event
20 March 2006	14:00	Group A

== Records ==
Prior to this competition, the existing world, Commonwealth and Games records were as follows:

World record	Snatch	Liu Chunhong (CHN)	122 kg	Athens, Greece	19 August 2004
World record	Clean & Jerk	Zarema Kasayeva (RUS)	157 kg	Doha, Qatar	13 November 2005
World record	Total	Liu Chunhong (CHN)	275 kg	Athens, Greece	19 August 2004
Commonwealth record	Snatch	Karnam Malleswari (IND)	110 kg	Sydney, Australia	19 September 2000
Commonwealth record	Clean & Jerk	Madeleine Yamechi (CMR)	132 kg	Vancouver, Canada	19 November 2003
Commonwealth record	Total	Karnam Malleswari (IND)	240 kg	Sydney, Australia	19 September 2000
Games record	Snatch	Madeleine Yamechi (CMR)	100 kg	Manchester, Great Britain	2 August 2002
Games record	Clean & Jerk	Madeleine Yamechi (CMR)	130 kg	Manchester, Great Britain	2 August 2002
Games record	Total	Madeleine Yamechi (CMR)	230 kg	Manchester, Great Britain	2 August 2002

The following records were established during the competition:

Clean & Jerk	132 kg	Jeane Lassen (CAN)	GR

== Results ==
Rank	Athlete	Nation	Group	Body weight	Snatch (kg)				Clean & Jerk (kg)				Total
Rank	Athlete	Nation	Group	Body weight	1	2	3	Result	1	2	3	Result	Total
1st place, gold medalist(s)	Jeane Lassen	Canada	A	68.59	97	~~101~~	~~101~~	97	126	132	~~138~~	132	229
2nd place, silver medalist(s)	Monika Devi	India	A	68.00	93	96	100	100	112	122	~~126~~	122	222
3rd place, bronze medalist(s)	Janet Thelermont	Seychelles	A	67.85	90	~~95~~	95	95	~~110~~	~~110~~	110	110	205
4	Amanda Phillips	Australia	A	68.44	~~84~~	84	~~88~~	84	100	105	109	109	193
5	Natasha Perdue	Wales	A	66.75	~~72~~	72	77	77	~~93~~	93	~~97~~	93	170
6	Irene Ajambo	Uganda	A	67.31	65	~~70~~	70	70	90	~~93~~	~~93~~	90	160
7	Agnes Selepe	Lesotho	A	68.93	30	35	~~40~~	35	35	38	41	41	76
