= Athletics at the 2006 Commonwealth Games – Men's javelin throw =

Men's javelin throw at the Commonwealth Games
- Venue: Melbourne Cricket Ground
- Competitors: 13 from 7 nations
- Winning distance: 80.10 m

Medalists
gold medal	Nick Nieland	England
silver medal	William Hamlyn-Harris	Australia
bronze medal	Oliver Dziubak	Australia

The men's javelin throw event at the 2006 Commonwealth Games was held on March 25.

== Results ==
Rank	Athlete	Nationality	#1	#2	#3	#4	#5	#6	Result	Notes
1st place, gold medalist(s)	Nicholas Nieland	England	80.10	x	x	76.76	x	80.06	80.10	SB
2nd place, silver medalist(s)	William Hamlyn-Harris	Australia	75.18	70.05	x	73.83	79.89	79.48	79.89	SB
3rd place, bronze medalist(s)	Oliver Dziubak	Australia	78.43	77.59	x	79.89	x	77.16	79.89	
4	Gerhardus Pienaar	South Africa	69.94	75.54	78.91	74.62	74.45	75.41	78.91	
5	John Robert Oosthuizen	South Africa	77.15	74.34	76.55	73.16	78.32	75.33	78.32	
6	Jarrod Bannister	Australia	78.06	76.43	74.66	70.31	x	75.62	78.06	PB
7	Stuart Farquhar	New Zealand	73.81	75.82	74.02	74.13	73.14	77.40	77.40	
8	Scott Russell	Canada	73.88	71.88	x	x	x	72.04	73.88	
9	David Parker	England	72.95	70.71	x				72.95	
10	Benjamin Houghton	Northern Ireland	72.46	69.94	68.07				72.46	PB
11	Muhammad Hussain Irfan	Pakistan	61.43	68.19	72.28				72.28	
12	Michael Allen	Northern Ireland	68.05	70.56	x				70.56	
13	Andre Rautenbach	South Africa	58.01	66.75	65.89				66.75	
