= Liz Blatchford =

English triathlete (born 1980)

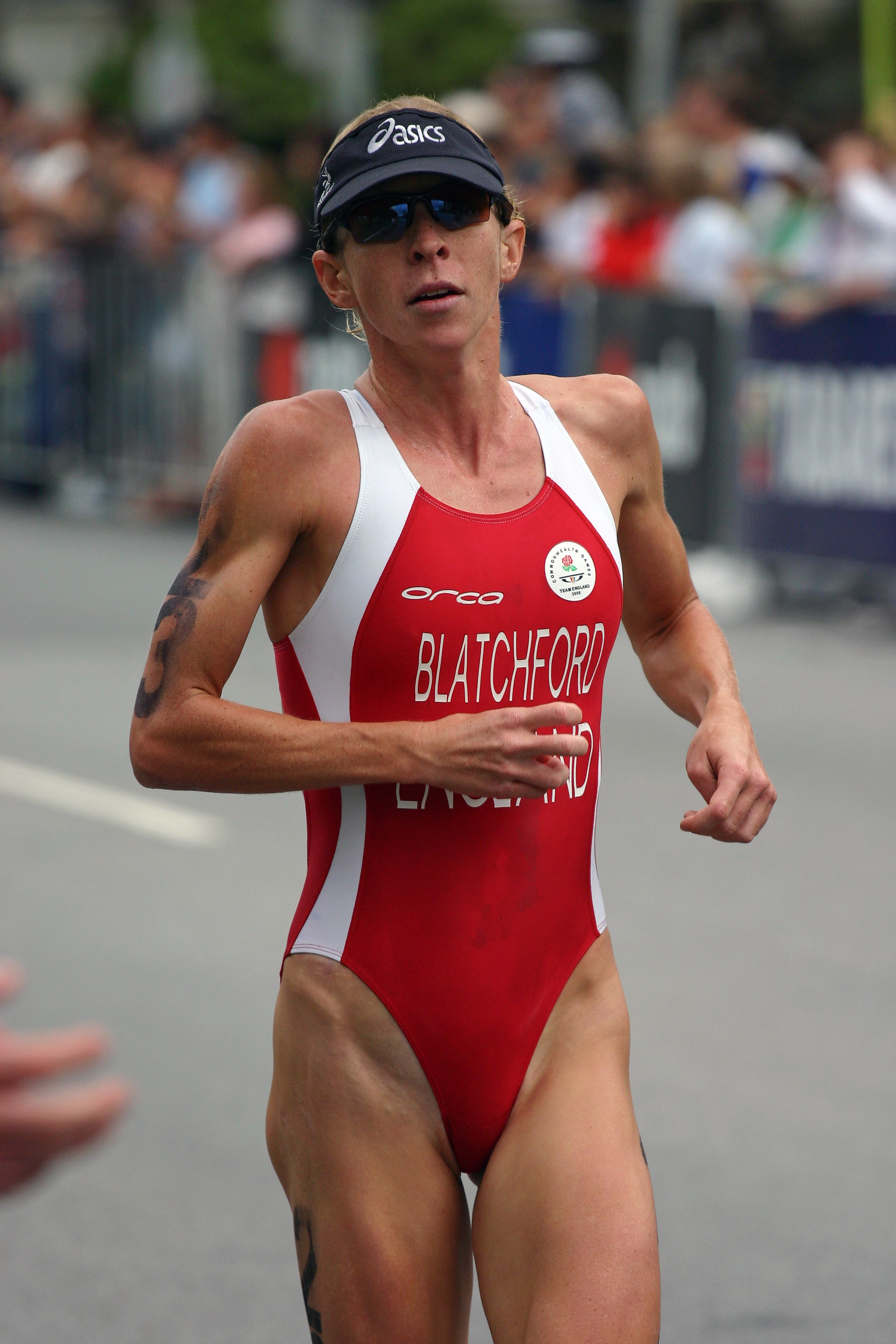
- Liz Blatchford competing at the 2006 Commonwealth Games

Personal information
- Born: 5 February 1980 (age 46) Wilmslow, Cheshire
- Height: 1.71 m (5 ft 7 1/2 in)
- Weight: 56 kg (123 lb)
- Spouse: Glen Murray

Sport
- Country: Great Britain
- Sport: Triathlon
- Team: Uplace-BMC
- Turned pro: 2001
- Coached by: Mat Steinmetz
Medal record
Representing Great Britain
Women's triathlon
Ironman Triathlon World Championship
Bronze medal – third place	2015 Kailua-Kona	Elite
Bronze medal – third place	2013 Kailua-Kona	Elite

Elizabeth Julia Blatchford (born 5 February 1980) is an English professional triathlete. She has placed third at the 2013 and 2015 Ironman World Championship.

== Career ==
Blatchford was born in Wilmslow, Cheshire and raised in Perth, Western Australia from the age of one. Growing up she participated in surf lifesaving and by the age of 14 she had started racing in triathlon. She went on to obtain a degree in marine biology from Griffith University.

Blatchford's first ITU race was at the 2000 ITU Triathlon World Championships in Perth competing as a Junior woman and placing 8th. She raced consistently on the ITU circuit from 2001 to 2012 capturing ten podium finishes in either the ITU World Triathlon Series or the ITU Triathlon World Cup series including wins at the 2003 Gamagori World Cup race and the 2005 Salford World Cup race. Despite growing up in Australia Blatchford made the decision to race for the United Kingdom in 2004. This was done based on her desire to qualify for the 2004 Olympics and that the British women at the time were not as strong as the Australian women. Additionally, her coach, Brett Sutton, was not supported by Triathlon Australia. However, in her years of ITU racing she missed qualifying for three Olympics. Missing the 2012 Olympic cut was difficult for Blatchford as a younger, inexperienced Lucy Hall was chosen over her and Jodie Stimpson so that Hall could play a domestique role.

In 2012 Blatchford began to step away from ITU racing and towards non-drafting, long-distances races, a choice based on her age in comparison to the younger ITU athletes and for the desire to have more autonomy with her race and training schedule. Her first year away from ITU she took first place at Ironman 70.3 Boulder and Ironman 70.3 Cozumel and in 2013 she had first places at Ironman 70.3 Busselton and Ironman Cairns. She capped off that year with a third place podium in her debut in Hawaii at the 2013 Ironman World Championship. She followed that performance up with a 10th place at the 2014 Ironman World Championship, where she received a four-minute littering penalty, and then another third place podium finish at the 2015 Ironman World Championship. Her other long course results include winning Ironman Cairns three years in a row from 2013 to 2015.

== Results ==
Blatchford's results include:

Results list

Year	Event	Place
2018	Ironman Subic Bay	1
2018	Ironman 70.3 Busselton	1
2017	Ironman 70.3 Asia-Pacific Championship	5
2017	Noosa Triathlon	7
2015	Ironman World Championship	3
2015	Ironman Mont-Tremblant	2
2015	Ironman Cairns	1
2015	Ironman 70.3 Vietnam	2
2015	Ironman 70.3 Busselton	2
2015	Challenge Batemans Bay Half	2
2015	Ironman 70.3 Geelong	1
2014	Ironman Western Australia	3
2014	Challenge Forster Half	1
2014	Noosa Triathlon	4
2014	Ironman World Championship	10
2014	Ironman 70.3 European Championship	5
2014	Ironman Cairns	1
2014	Ironman 70.3 Mallorca	3
2014	Ironmam 70.3 Putrajaya	2
2014	Huskission Long Course	1
2013	Noosa Triathlon	5
2013	Ironman World Championship	3
2013	Hy-Vee Triathlon US Championship	9
2013	Ironman Mont Tremblant US Championship	4
2013	Ironman Cairns	1
2013	Ironman 70.3 Busselton	1
2013	Samui Long Course Triathlon	2
2013	Huskission Long Course	1
2013	Ironman 70.3 Asia Pacific Championship	7
2012	Noosa Triathlon	3
2012	Ironman 70.3 Mandurah	2
2012	LA Triathlon	4
2012	Ironman 70.3 Cozumel	1
2012	Hy-Vee 5i50 US Championship	8
2012	Life Time Tri Chicago	4
2012	Ironman 70.3 Boulder	1
2012	5i50 New York	2
2012	5i50 Liverpool	4
2012	5i50 Klagenfurt	2
2012	World Triathlon Series Madrid	10
2012	World Triathlon Series San Diego	16
2012	World Triathlon Series Sydney	18
2012	ITU World Cup Mooloolaba	4
2012	Geelong Sprint Triathlon Premium Oceania Cup	3
2011	World Championship Grand Final Beijing	8
2011	World Championship Series Kitzbuehel	27
2011	ITU World Cup Monterrey	13
2011	World Championship Series Sydney	8
2011	ITU World Cup Mooloolaba	7
2010	Triathlon World Championship Grand Final Budapest	19
2010	World Championship Series London	DNF
2010	World Championship Series Hamburg	18
2010	Hy-Vee Triathlon Elite Cup	9
2010	World Championship Series Madrid	8
2010	ITU World Cup Ishigaki	2
2010	World Championship Series Sydney	12
2010	ITU World Cup Mooloolaba	3
2009	World Championship Grand Final Gold Coast	10
2009	World Championship Series Yokohama	4
2009	World Championship Series London	22
2009	World Championship Series Hamburg	DNF
2009	Hy-Vee Triathlon Elite Cup	5
2009	World Championship Series Tongyeong	13
2009	Mooloolaba ITU World Cup	9
2008	Hy-Vee ITU World Cup	5
2008	Triathlon World Championships Vancouver	17
2008	ITU World Cup Madrid	DNF
2008	ITU World Cup New Plymouth	5
2008	ITU World Cup Mooloolaba	16
2007	ITU World Cup Mooloolaba	DNF
2007	Triathlon Oceania Championships Geelong OTU	5
2006	ITU World Cup Hamburg	DNF
2006	Triathlon World Championships Lausanne	13
2006	Triathlon European Cup Geneva	4
2006	ITU World Cup Salford	7
2006	ITU World Cup Edmonton	DNS
2006	Triathlon Oceania Championships Geelong OTU	5
2006	ITU World Cup Mooloolaba	2
2006	2006 Commonwealth Games	6
2005	ITU World Cup Beijing	9
2005	Triathlon World Championships Gamagori	8
2005	Triathlon European Championships Lausanne ETU	14
2005	ITU World Cup Salford	1
2005	ITU World Cup Madrid	5
2004	ITU World Cup Rio de Janeiro	2
2004	ITU World Cup Cancun	5
2004	ITU World Cup Gamagori	DNF
2004	ITU World Cup Madrid	2
2004	ITU World Cup Salford	3
2004	ITU World Cup Edmonton	7
2004	Triathlon Pan American Cup Bellingham	1
2004	ITU World Cup Mazatlan	5
2004	Triathlon Oceania Championships Devonport OCA	1
2003	Triathlon World Championships Queenstown	17
2003	ITU World Cup Athens	DNF
2003	ITU World Cup Madeira	DNF
2003	ITU World Cup Madrid	DNF
2003	ITU World Cup Nice	3
2003	ITU World Cup New York	6
2003	ITU World Cup Edmonton	11
2003	ITU World Cup Gamagori	1
2003	ITU World Cup Tongyeong	2
2003	Triathlon Oceania Cup Devonport	6
2002	Triathlon World Championships Cancun	14
2002	ITU World Cup Makuhari	3
2002	ITU World Cup Hamburg	8
2002	ITU World Cup Lausanne	6
2002	Triathlon European Cup Ghent	5
2002	ITU World Cup Tiszaujvaros	10
2002	ITU World Cup Corner Brook	6
2002	ITU World Cup Edmonton	8
2002	ITU World Cup Gamagori	10
2002	Triathlon Oceania Cup Canberra	10
2001	Triathlon Asian Cup Muju	3
2001	ITU World Cup Yamaguchi	7
2001	Triathlon World Championship Edmonton	40
2001	Triathlon European Cup Forte dei Marmi	2
2001	ITU World Cup Rennes	11
2001	ITU World Cup Ishigaki	6
2001	Triathlon Oceania Cup Devonport	7
2000	Triathlon World Championships Perth – Junior	8
