= Anuja Jung =

Indian sport shooter (born 1971)

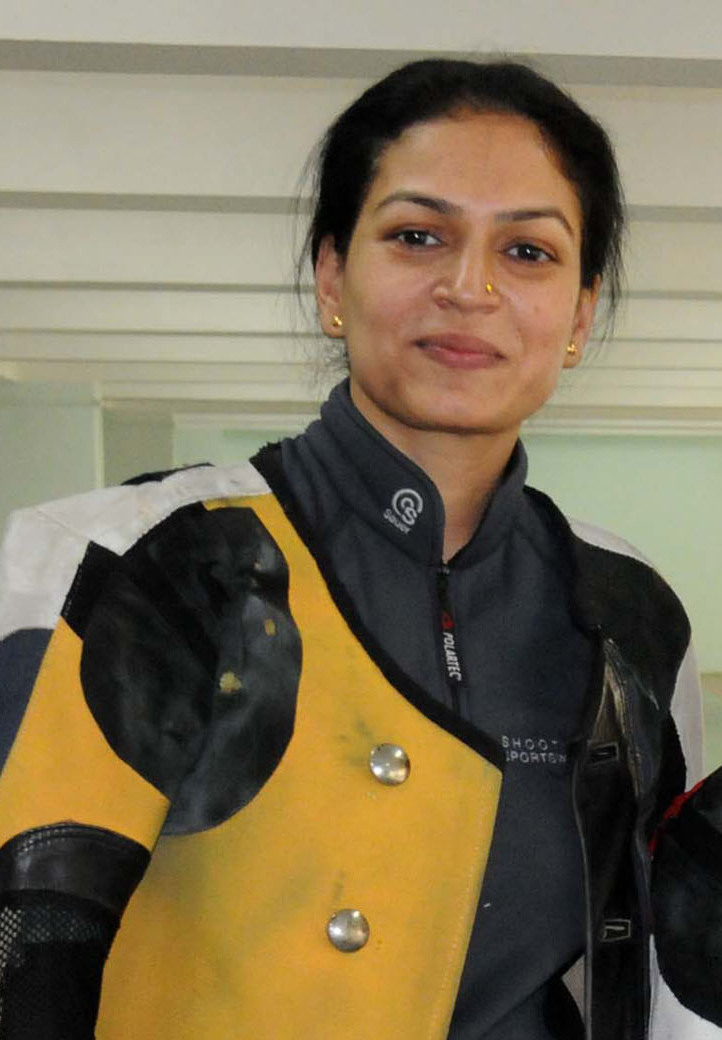

Personal information
- Nationality: Indian
- Born: 6 August 1971 (age 54); Thane, India
- Occupation: Shooter
- Height: 167 cm (5 ft 6 in)
- Spouse: Samaresh Jung

Anuja Jung (born 6 August 1971) is an Indian sport shooter from New Delhi, India.

== Career ==
She won the gold medal in the Women's 50m Rifle 3 Positions with 670.7 points and the silver medal in Women's 50m Rifle 3 Positions (Pairs) with Anjali Bhagwat with 1142 points at the 2006 Commonwealth Games.

== Personal life ==
She married Samaresh Jung, a reputed shooting sportsperson from India.
