= Ghana at the 2006 Commonwealth Games =

Sporting event delegation

Ghana at the Commonwealth Games
- CGF code: GHA
- CGA: Ghana Olympic Committee
- Website: ghanaolympic.org
- Medals: Gold 2 Silver 0 Bronze 1 Total 3

Commonwealth Games appearances (overview)
- 1954; 1958; 1962; 1966; 1970; 1974; 1978; 1982; 1986; 1990; 1994; 1998; 2002; 2006; 2010; 2014; 2018; 2022; 2026; 2030

Ghana was represented at the 2006 Commonwealth Games in Melbourne.

== Medals ==
	(gold)	(silver)	(bronze)	Total
Ghana	2	0	1	3

=== Gold ===
- Majeti Fetrie — Weightlifting, Men's – 77 kg
- Ignisious Gaisah — Athletics, Men's Long Jump

=== Silver ===
None

=== Bronze ===
- Awusone Yekeni — Boxing, Men's Heavyweight (– 91 kg)
