= Sam Bradley =

New Zealand triathlete (born 1971)

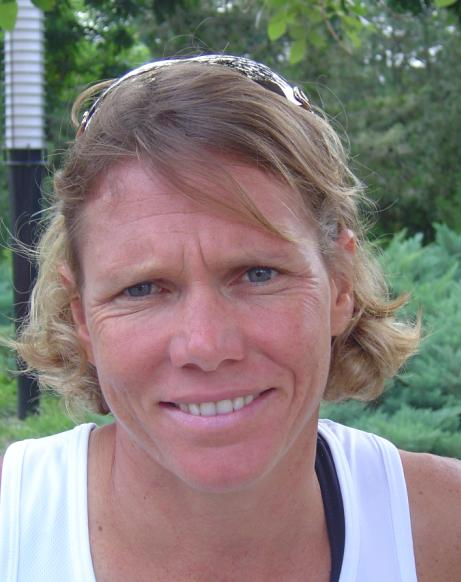
- Bradley at the 2008 Summer Olympics.

Personal information
- Born: Samantha Jane Warriner; 1 August 1971 (age 55) Alton, Hampshire, England
- Years active: 2004–present
Medal record
Women's triathlon
Representing New Zealand
Commonwealth Games
Silver medal – second place	2006 Melbourne	Elite
ITU World Championships
Bronze medal – third place	2008 Vancouver	Elite
ITU World Cup
Bronze medal – third place	2007	Overall
Gold medal – first place	2008	Overall

Sam Bradley (née Warriner; born 1 August 1971) is a retired triathlete who represented New Zealand in triathlons ranging from sprint distance up to the Ironman. She was born in Alton, Hampshire, England. She turned professional at the end of 2005 after competing internationally for 3 years while teaching full-time at Whangarei Girls High School. Bradley is now a sports co-ordinator in Taupo, New Zealand.

== Career ==
Bradley first competed in the triathlon at the 2004 Summer Olympics, finishing eighteenth. Known then as Samantha Warriner.

In 2005 Bradley had her first win on the ITU World Circuit on 15 May 2005 in Ishigaki in an ITU World Cup. She followed this up with a win in the Hamburg ITU World Cup in Germany on 6 August 2005.

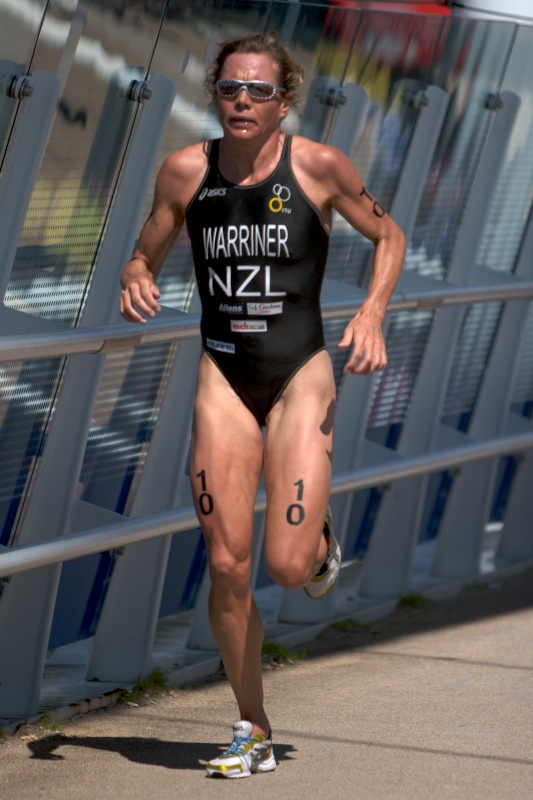
Bradley competing in the Salford Triathlon, 2007.

She placed 9th on the all-time list of female winners in the ITU World Cup. In 2008 Bradley won the overall ITU World Cup series. Going into the final round of the ITU World Cup, Samantha was in 2nd position, and needed to finish 7th or above in the finale in Huatulco.

She won the final round and took the 2008 ITU World Cup Championship. She was awarded the ITU World Cup at the Madrid ITU World Congress at the beginning of December. In 2008, she finished 16th in the Olympic triathlon.

In 2009 Bradley won the Port of Tauranga Half Ironman in a course record time of 4:10:47.

After racing ITU triathlon Sam went on to win 7 x Ironman 70.3 events around the world.

In 2010 Bradley underwent heart surgery for super-ventricular tachycardia, 12 weeks later she won the Kelloggs Nutrigrain Ironman NZ in Taupō, New Zealand. Only 3 other women in the history of triathlon had won the ITU World Series and an Ironman in their career.

== Later career ==
Bradley runs a coaching business called Sweat7 Coaching based in Taupō, New Zealand, with her husband Stephen Bradley. Bradley gave birth to daughter Lola-Rose in 2012.

The team have coached 4 x ITU World Champions (2 Elite, 2 Age Group), and a Paralympic Silver Medalist, along with numerous age group triathletes. She is sponsored by; Asics, Blueseventy, and Sweat7 Coaching.

Bradley is currently a sports co-ordinator for Taupo intermediate school in Taupo, New Zealand.

== Achievements ==
2009

- 1st – Ironman 70.3 Geelong (Geelong, Australia)
