= Vivek Singh (sport shooter) =

Indian sport shooter

Vivek Singh is an Indian shooter. He won the silver medal in the Men's Air Pistol, and gold in Men's 50m Pistol (Pairs), with Samaresh Jung, at the 2002 Commonwealth Games. He also won the silver medal in the Men's 10m Air Pistol at the 2006 Commonwealth Games. He received the Arjuna award by the Government of India in 1999.
