= Triathlon at the 2006 Commonwealth Games =

- Venue: St. Kilda
- Location: Melbourne, Australia
- Dates: 15 to 26 March 2006

Triathlon at the 2006 Commonwealth Games was the second appearance of Triathlon at the Commonwealth Games. Competition was held in Melbourne, Australia, from 15 to 26 March 2006.

The triathlon events were held in the Melbourne suburb of St. Kilda. Both men's and women's courses were conducted over the Olympic distance of 1500 m swim, 40 km ride and 10 km run, and were held according to the International Triathlon Union (ITU) rules.

Australia topped the triathlon medal table by virtue of winning both gold medals.

== Medal table ==
* Host nation (Australia)

Rank	Nation	Gold	Silver	Bronze	Total
1	Australia*	2	0	1	3
2	New Zealand	0	2	1	3
Totals (2 entries)		2	2	2	6

== Men's competition ==
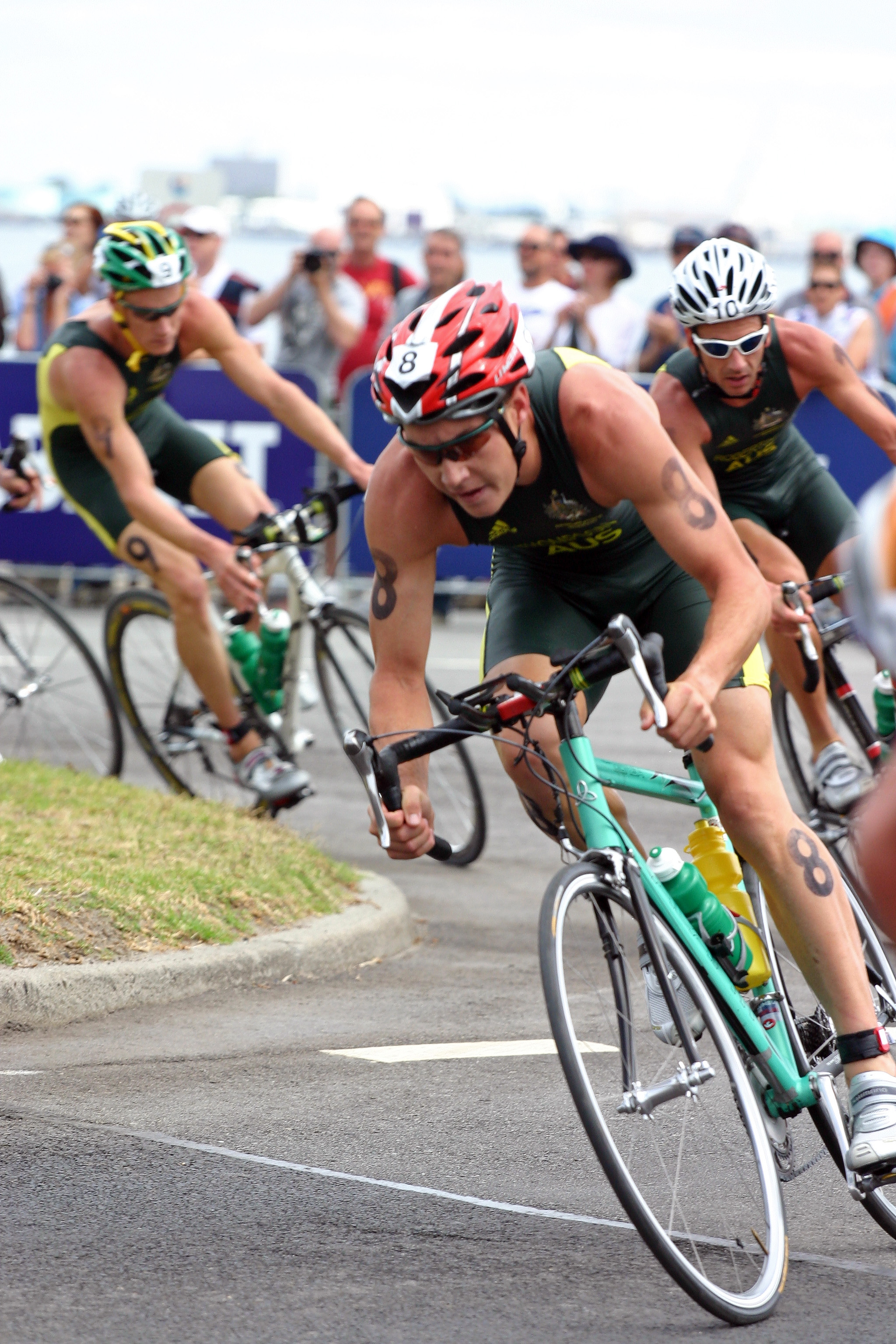
The Australian trio of Thompson, Kahlefeldt and Robertson lead the cycling pack

Rank	Triathlete	Time
1st place, gold medalist(s)	Brad Kahlefeldt (AUS)	1:49:16
2nd place, silver medalist(s)	Bevan Docherty (NZL)	1:49:26
3rd place, bronze medalist(s)	Peter Robertson (AUS)	1:49:32
4	Tim Don (ENG)	1:49:38
5	Kris Gemmell (NZL)	1:50:10
6	Hamish Carter (NZL)	1:50:35
7	William Clarke (ENG)	1:50:42
8	Paul Tichelaar (CAN)	1:50:51
9	Stuart Hayes (ENG)	1:50:53
10	Hendrik Petrus de Villiers (RSA)	1:50:53
11	Simon Thompson (AUS)	1:51:15
12	Brent McMahon (CAN)	1:51:50
13	Brad Storm (RSA)	1:52:35
14	Marc Jenkins (WAL)	1:53:40
15	Gavin Noble (NIR)	1:54:25
16	Colin Jenkins (CAN)	1:56:07
17	Brian Michael Campbell (NIR)	1:59:34
18	Ian Andrew Le Pelley (GUE)	2:03:36
19	Timothy Rogers (JER)	2:05:25
20	Damian Christian Thacker (GUE)	2:05:44
21	Alan Francis Rowe (GUE)	2:05:53
22	Scott Pitcher (JEY)	2:06:34
23	Paul Clements (JEY)	2:06:58
24	Marc Decaul (GRN)	2:10:53
25	Cedric Bathfield (MRI)	2:12:23
26	Christopher Bennett Symonds (GHA)	2:14:41
27	Elliot Shane Mason (ANT)	2:18:44
28	Michee Nehemie Paul Bhageea (MRI)	2:19:54
29	Stanley Ofasisili (SOL)	2:28:11
30	Marcus Forau (SOL)	2:33:55
31	Wilfred Tony Bosa (SOL)	2:36:15

== Women's competition ==
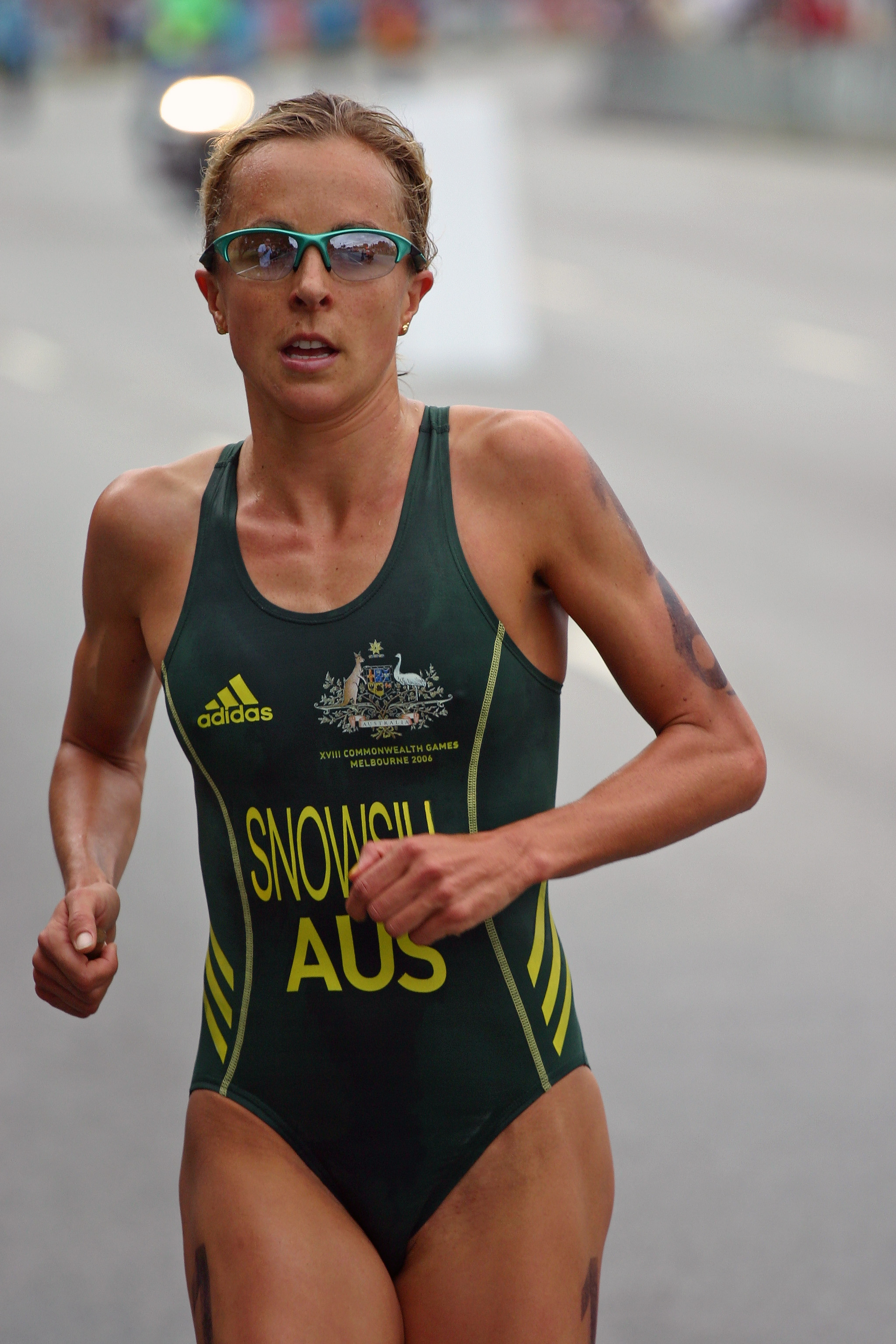
Emma Snowsill on her way to a gold medal

Rank	Triathlete	Time
	Emma Snowsill (AUS)	1:58:02
	Samantha Warriner (NZL)	1:58:38
	Andrea Hewitt (NZL)	1:58:46
4	Debbie Tanner (NZL)	1:58:46
5	Annabel Luxford (AUS)	1:59:19
6	Liz Blatchford (ENG)	1:59:30
7	Andrea Whitcombe (ENG)	2:00:11
8	Flora Duffy (BER)	2:00:35
9	Jill Savege (CAN)	2:00:54
10	Julie Dibens (ENG)	2:01:02
11	Anneliese Heard (WAL)	2:02:05
12	Suzanne Weckend (CAN)	2:02:18
13	Leanda Cave (WAL)	2:02:28
14	Felicity Abram (AUS)	2:03:24
15	Catriona Morrison (SCO)	2:04:30
16	Kate Roberts (RSA)	2:04:47
17	Helen Tucker (WAL)	2:05:30
18	Kerry Lang (SCO)	2:06:16
19	Gillian Kornell (CAN)	2:06:43
20	Samantha Lesley Herridge (GGY)	2:08:10
21	Heather Wilson (NIR)	2:12:46
22	Kimbeley Fui Li Yap (MAS)	2:17:29
23	Kelly Marie Mouttet (TRI)	2:18:47
24	Karen Denise Smith (BER)	2:22:22

== See also ==
- Triathlon at the 2002 Commonwealth Games
