= Salford Triathlon =

The Salford Triathlon was an international-level triathlon event held annually from 2000 to 2007 in the city of Salford in north west England. It was the only United Kingdom leg of the International Triathlon Union's Triathlon World Cup during this time.

== History ==
With the sport of triathlon becoming increasingly popular, in 2000 Greater Manchester's councils created a role for a Triathlon Development Officer who would encourage the sport at a grass roots level in schools and the community. The interest was incredible and it was from here that the Millennium Waterfronts Triathlon was born.

The MWT combined the north west regional championships and national championships for under 21s - with 500 people competing for the titles, including Richard Allen, Richard Stannard, and Jodie Swallow.

The success of that first event was proved when Salford won the right to hold the National Triathlon Championships in 2001 - attracting 1000 competitors from all over the world, including a host of big names for the elite races, like Simon Whitfield and Leanda Cave.

It was the first time the nationals had come to the North of the country - John Lunt, Race Director, said at the time:

"This has been the best course in the country for competitors. Having a closed city centre course is very rare and lets athletes go right into the heart of Manchester - creating a fantastic atmosphere between them and the spectators."

Those national championships also proved to be an important rehearsal for the Triathlon events at the 2002 Commonwealth Games in Manchester. Over 100,000 spectators lined the route to view one of the few free Games events as Simon Whitfield and Carol Montgomery raced to gold.

== World Cup ==
A legacy of the Commonwealth Games event was the awarding of a leg of the 2003 World Cup to Salford. Further successful events in the following years allowed promoters Salford City Council and event operator Human Race to bid to host the 2010 ITU Triathlon World Championships. The bid however was unsuccessful.

The event was not held in 2008 because of its proximity to the Olympic Games, the absence of BBC Sport coverage, and major building work (part of MediaCityUK) close to the area usually used for transition.

== The future ==
The Salford Triathlon has been set a provisional return date of 26 July 2009. With the Olympic Games due to be held in London in 2012, it is possible the World Cup may not return to Salford since as part of London's preparation it must hold an international-level test event on the Olympic course at least once in the years prior to the Games. Whilst possible, it is unlikely the ITU would hold more than one World Cup event in the United Kingdom in any one year.

== Previous World Cup winners ==
This table lists the previous winners of the World Cup events held in Salford from 2003 to 2007.

Year	Elite Men	Elite Women
2003	Andrew Johns (GBR)	Pip Taylor (AUS)
2004	Maik Petzold (GER)	Michelle Dillon (GBR)
2005	Frédéric Belaubre (FRA)	Liz Blatchford (GBR)
2006	Brad Kahlefeldt (AUS)	Sam Warriner (NZL)
2007	Javier Gómez (ESP)	Vanessa Fernandes (POR)

== See also ==
- ITU Triathlon World Cup
