= Oliver Dziubak =

Australian javelin thrower

Personal information
- Nationality: Australian
- Born: 30 March 1982 (age 44) Velbert, West Germany
- Height: 197 cm (6 ft 6 in)
- Weight: 101 kg (223 lb)

Sport
- Sport: Athletics
- Event: Javelin
- Club: Mandurah/Rockingham
Medal record
Representing Australia
Bronze medal – third place	2006 Melbourne	Javelin

Oliver Dziubak (born 30 March 1982) is a male javelin thrower from Australia. His personal best is 82.79 metres, achieved in February 2004 in Melbourne.

Dziubak won the bronze medal at the 2006 Commonwealth Games. In addition he competed at the 2004 Olympic Games without reaching the final.

== Achievements ==
Year	Competition	Venue	Position	Notes
2004	Olympic Games	Athens, Greece	19th	78.53 m
2006	Commonwealth Games	Melbourne, Australia	3rd	79.89 m

== Seasonal bests by year ==
- 2000 - 63.17
- 2001 - 75.90
- 2002 - 70.93
- 2004 - 82.79
- 2005 - 78.97
- 2006 - 81.57
- 2007 - 75.21
- 2008 - 75.17
