= William Hamlyn-Harris =

Australian javelin thrower

Personal information
- Nationality: Australian
- Born: 14 January 1978 (age 48) Port Vila, Vanuatu
- Height: 191 cm (6 ft 3 in)
- Weight: 96 kg (212 lb)

Sport
- Sport: Athletics
- Event: Javelin
- Club: Western Suburbs AAC
Medal record
Representing Australia
Silver medal – second place	2006 Melbourne	Javelin

William Donald Hamlyn-Harris (born 14 January 1978) is a javelin thrower from Australia. His personal best is 85.60 metres, achieved in January 2004 in Canberra.

== Achievements ==
Year	Competition	Venue	Position	Notes
2002	Commonwealth Games	Manchester, United Kingdom	4th	79.89 m
2002	World Cup	Madrid, Spain	7th	
2003	Universiade	Daegu, South Korea	3rd	75.50 m
2004	Olympic Games	Athens, Greece	21st (q)	77.43 m
2006	Commonwealth Games	Melbourne, Australia	2nd	79.89 m

== Seasonal bests by year ==
- 2001 - 77.23
- 2002 - 79.52
- 2003 - 81.82
- 2004 - 85.60
- 2006 - 79.89
- 2007 - 71.61
- 2008 - 74.96
