= Majeti Fetrie =

Ghanaian weightlifter

Personal information
- Nationality: Ghanaian
- Born: 12 June 1974 (age 52)
- Height: 1.41 m (4 ft 7 1/2 in)
- Weight: 80 kg (180 lb)

Sport
- Sport: Weightlifting
- Event: Men's 77 kg
Medal record
Representing Ghana
Men's Weightlifting
Commonwealth Games
Gold medal – first place	2006 Melbourne	Men's 77 kg
- Updated on 12 October 2014

Majeti Fetrie (born 12 June 1974) is a Ghanaian Weightlifter. He competed in the men's 77 kg event at the 2006 Commonwealth Games where he won a gold medal.
