= David Dixon Award =

Award given to outstanding athlete of Commonwealth Games

David Dixon Award is a four-yearly award given to the outstanding athlete of each Commonwealth Games, based on their performance at the event, fair play, and overall contribution to their team's participation at the Commonwealth Games.

The award was introduced in the 2002 Commonwealth Games in Manchester and is named after the former honorary secretary of the Commonwealth Games Federation for 17 years, David Dixon.

== Winners ==
| Year | Athlete | Athletic field | Country |
|---|---|---|---|
| 2002 | Natalie du Toit | Swimming | South Africa |
| 2006 | Samaresh Jung | Shooting | India |
| 2010 | Trecia Smith | Athletics | Jamaica |
| 2014 | Francesca Jones | Rhythmic gymnastics | Wales |
| 2018 | David Liti | Weightlifting | New Zealand |
| 2022 | Feng Tianwei | Table Tennis | Singapore |
| 2026 | Melanie Woods | Para Athletics | Scotland |
