= Samaresh Jung =

Indian sport shooter (born 1970)

Personal information
- Born: 19 May 1970 (age 56) Sirmaur, Himachal Pradesh, India
- Height: 170 cm (5 ft 7 in)
- Weight: 98 kg (216 lb)

Sport
- Country: India
- Sport: Shooting
Medal record
Men's shooting
Representing India
Commonwealth Games
Gold medal – first place	2002 Manchester	free pistol team
Gold medal – first place	2002 Manchester	standard pistol team
Gold medal – first place	2006 Melbourne	10 m air pistol
Gold medal – first place	2006 Melbourne	10 m air pistol team
Gold medal – first place	2006 Melbourne	25 m centre-fire pistol team
Gold medal – first place	2006 Melbourne	25 m Standard pistol team
Gold medal – first place	2006 Melbourne	50 m pistol
Silver medal – second place	2002 Manchester	air pistol
Silver medal – second place	2002 Manchester	free pistol
Silver medal – second place	2002 Manchester	air pistol team
Silver medal – second place	2006 Melbourne	50 m pistol team
Silver medal – second place	2010 Delhi	25 m standard pistol team
Bronze medal – third place	2006 Melbourne	25 m centre fire pistol
Bronze medal – third place	2010 Delhi	25 m standard pistol
Asian Games
Bronze medal – third place	2014 Incheon	10 m air pistol team
Asian Championships
Silver medal – second place	2007 Kuwait City	25 m center fire pistol team
Silver medal – second place	2015 Kuwait City	25 m center fire pistol team

Samaresh Jung (born 19 May 1970) is an Indian sport shooter. He is an air pistol specialist. At the 2002 Commonwealth Games in Manchester, he won two gold medals, in the men's free pistol pairs and in the open event of 25 m standard pistol pairs, both in partnership with Jaspal Rana. He contested in the 10 m air pistol and 50 m pistol events at the 2008 Summer Olympics in Beijing, but failed to reach the finals in both events.

He received the Arjuna award in 2002. He is employed with the CISF and lives in New Delhi.

On 3 October 2010, he had the honour of bearing the Queen's Baton in its Opening Ceremony run in the stadium for the 2010 Commonwealth Games of Delhi.

== Early life ==
Samresh Jung was born on 19 May 1970, in Haripur khol Nahan Himachal Pradesh. Son of a retired colonel of the Indian Army, Jung learnt the art of shooting from his grandfather, Sher Jung, who was a freedom fighter, besides being an ace shooter.

Jung completed his preliminary education from the Modern School in Delhi. Thereafter, he enrolled himself at the Osmania University in Hyderabad, from where he gained his graduation degree. Very few people know that he is a good player of chess too.

== Career ==
=== 2006 Commonwealth Games ===
At the 2006 Commonwealth Games, he was in contention for eight medals. Starting off with a silver, he finally won five Gold, one silver and one bronze. After winning the one silver and five Gold, nerves got the better of him in the 25m centrefire pistol individual event where he could manage only a bronze. In the standard fire pistol individual competition, his gun malfunctioned and he fell out of contention for a medal in that event. He was given the David Dixon Award at the closing ceremony, an award given to the "most outstanding athlete at the 18th Commonwealth Games". He was dubbed "Goldfinger" by the volunteers at the Games .

== Awards and medals ==
2002

- Arjuna Award
- Commonwealth Games: 2 gold medals (men's free pistol pairs and open standard pistol pairs, each with Jaspal Rana) and 3 silver medals (air pistol individual, free pistol individual, and free pistol pairs, the last with Rana)

2004

- SAF Games: 1 silver medal (25m standard pistol)

2005

- Fifth Commonwealth Shooting Championship: 2 gold medals, 2 silver medals, and 1 bronze medal
- Indian National Games: 1 gold medal (10m air pistol)

2006

- Commonwealth Games: David Dixon Award (as best athlete of the Games); 5 gold medals (men's 50m pistol, men's 10m air pistol, men's 25m centre fire pistol pairs (with Rana), men's 10m air pistol pairs (with Vivek Singh, and men's 25m standard pistol pairs (with Ronak Pandit), 1 silver medal (men's 50m pistol pairs with Singh), and 1 bronze medal (men's 25m centre fire pistol)

== Personal life ==
He married Anuja Jung.
