= Mohammed Asdullah =

Indian weightlifter

Mohammed Zakir Asdullah (born 28 August 1980) is an Indian weightlifter. He won the silver medal in the Men's 77 kg category at the 2006 Commonwealth Games.
