= Renu Bala Chanu =

Indian weightlifter (born 1986)

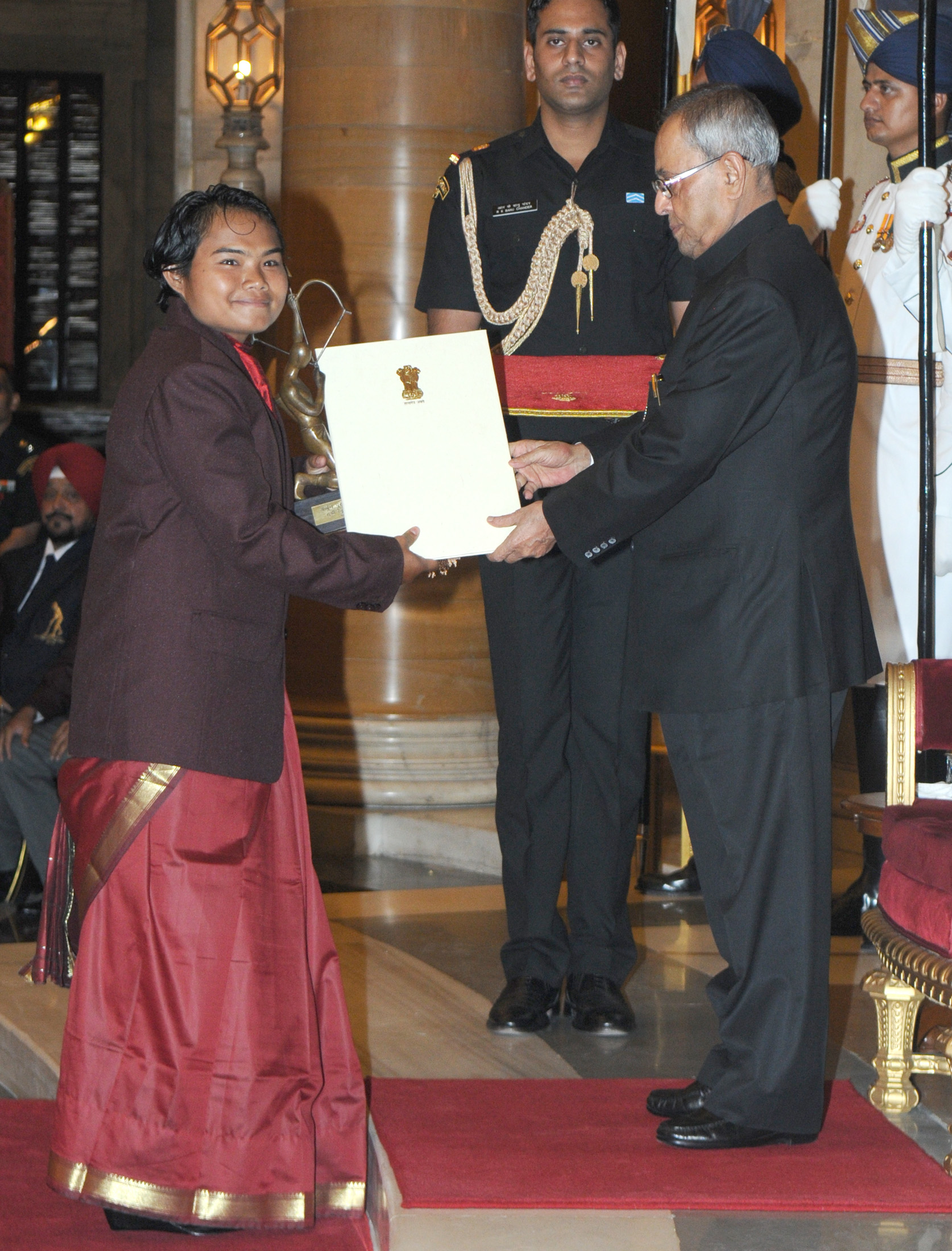
President Pranab Mukherjee presenting the Arjuna Award for 2014 to Yumanam Renu Bala Chanu

Yumnam Renu Bala Chanu (born 2 October 1986) is an Indian weightlifter, hailing from Kyamgei Mayai Leikai village located near Imphal, Manipur. She secured a gold medal in the Women's 58 kg category at the 2006 Commonwealth Games.

== Career ==
Renu Bala's career kicked off when she was selected for training during a 'talent hunt' camp of Sports Authority of India, at Imphal in the year 2000, when after winning a silver in the state championship, she was recommended to the SAI. She received training at Lucknow under Hansa Sharma and GP Sharma.

Renubala hails from Manipur but represents Assam, and was the third athlete from the former to have won a medal, after Soniya Chanu (silver in women's 48 kg) and Sandhaya Rani Devi (bronze in women's 48 kg). She represented Assam in the 2007 Guwahati National Games and won four gold medals for the State.

She succeeded in defending her gold medal again at the 2010 Commonwealth Games at Delhi. The Northeast Frontier Railway employee set a new Games snatch record with a lift of 90 kg in her final attempt. Renu added 107 kg to her snatch record to total 197 to win the gold medal for the second successive time. She heaved 88 kg and broke the prior record held by Maryse Turcotte from Canada during the 2002 Games, and improved it in her next attempt to bring it up to 90 kg. Her national record is 93 for snatch, 119 for clean jerk and 209 for total. She dedicated her gold medal to the people of India and to the Indian Weightlifting Federation, saying that her win would help the Federation to recover from their recent setbacks. She expressed her pride and the significance of her achievements for someone hailing from a financially troubled background, and described her medal as a token of acknowledgement for the efforts her family, and coaches put in for her training.

In 2014, she was felicitated jointly by the Assam Weightlifting Association (AWA) and the Assam Olympic Association (AOA). She won the Arjuna Award in 2014.

She was unable to participate in the Guangzhou Asian Games in 2010 and the 2014 Commonwealth Games in Glasgow due to health related issues.
