= Janet Georges =

Seychellois weightlifter

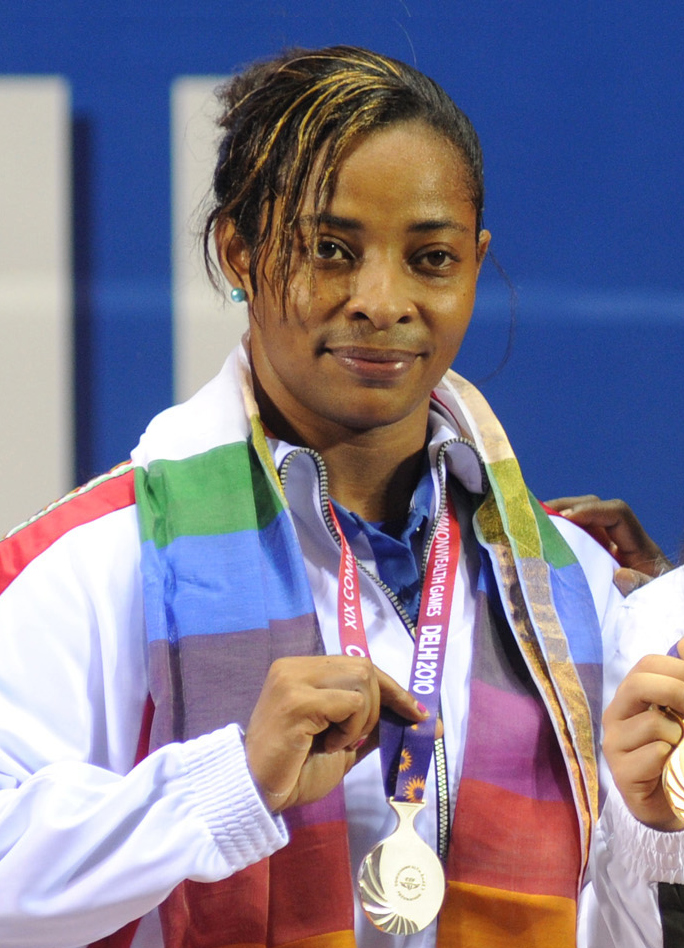
- Georges at the 2010 Commonwealth Games

Personal information
- Full name: Janet Marie Georges
- Born: 5 January 1979 (age 47)

Sport
- Sport: Weightlifting
- Team: National team
Medal record
Representing Seychelles
Commonwealth Games
Bronze medal – third place	2006 Melbourne	-69 kg
Silver medal – second place	2010 Delhi	-69 kg

Janet Marie Georges (born Janet Marie Thelermont 5 January 1979) is a weightlifter and policewoman from Seychelles. Competing in the 69 kg division she won two medals at the Commonwealth Games, in 2006 and 2010. In 2024, she was appointed as commissioner of the Seychelles Prison Services.

== Career ==
Georges took up weightlifting aged 18, at the 2006 Commonwealth Games held in Melbourne, Australia she became the first female Commonwealth medalist from Seychelles when she won the bronze medal in the 69 kg weight class, before the event she had been suffering from the chikungunya virus and at her first clean and jerk attempt she fainted, after being treated by the doctors she was fit to continue and went on to win her medal. Four years later at the 2010 Commonwealth Games in Delhi, India, she went one better thus becoming the first female from Seychelles to win a silver medal at the Commonwealth Games, in the same weight class she was only beaten by Canadian Christine Girard.

In June 2012 having failed to qualify for the 2012 Summer Olympics and also suffering from a bad back she decided to take a break from the sport and in 2013 gave birth to her son Youcas, before returning to the sport and competing at the 2014 Commonwealth Games held in Glasgow, Scotland, where this time she finished 10th.

In July 2024 she was appointed as commissioner of the Seychelles Prison Services. She was the first woman to take the role.

== Achievements ==
Georges has been named Female Lifter of the Year by the Seychelles Weightlifting Committee on 13 occasions, she has also been named Sportswoman of the Year at the Seychelles Sports Awards four times in 2002, 2004, 2006 and 2010. As well as working as a policewoman she has also served as vice chairperson of the athletes commission of the Seychelles Olympic and Commonwealth Games Association.
