= Geeta Rani =

Indian weightlifter (born 1981)

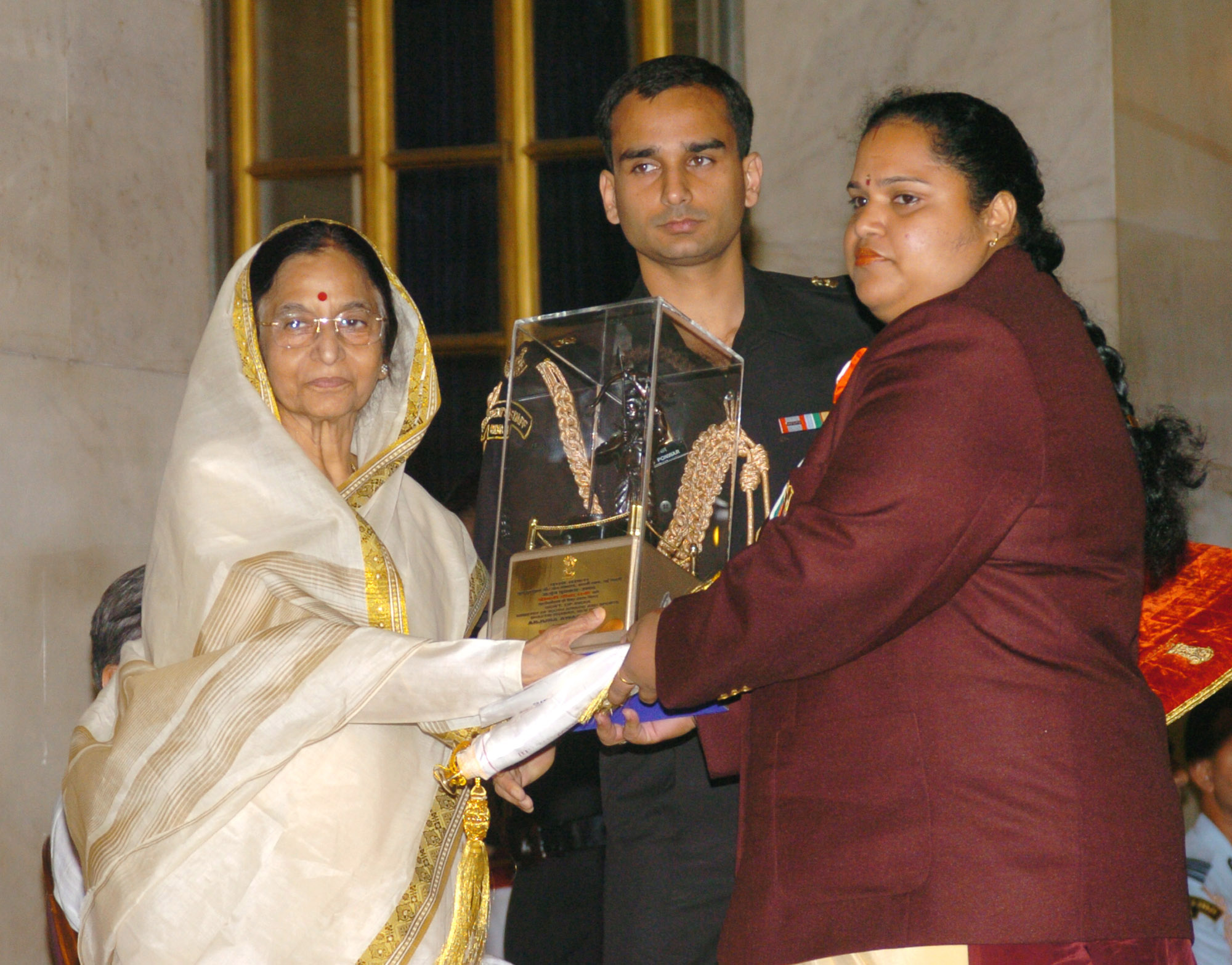
President Pratibha Patil presenting the Arjuna Award to Geeta Rani in 2007

Geeta Rani (born 16 September 1981) is an Indian weightlifter. She won the gold medal in the Women's +75 kg category at the 2006 Commonwealth Games. She won three silver medals in the Asian Championship in 2004 and a bronze medal in the 2003 Afro-Asian Games held in Hyderabad. In 2010 Commonwealth Games, she ranked 4th in the Women's +75 kg category. Her combined lift of 235 kg was 10 kg less than bronze medalist Deborah Acason's 245 kg lift.

== Awards and honors ==
In 2006, she received the Arjuna Award.
