= Keisha-Dean Soffe =

New Zealand weightlifter

Personal information
- Born: 28 September 1982 (age 43)
Medal record
Women's Weightlifting
Representing New Zealand
Commonwealth Games
Bronze medal – third place	2006 Melbourne	+ 75kg

Keisha-Dean Soffe (born 28 September 1982 in Waitara, New Zealand) is a New Zealand weightlifting competitor.

Soffe won the bronze medal in the Women's + 75 kg category at the 2006 Commonwealth Games.
