= Simple Kaur =

Indian weightlifter (born 1986)

Simple Kaur Bhumrah (born 20 March 1986) is an Indian weightlifter. She won the silver medal in the Women's +75 kg category at the 2006 Commonwealth Games. She has acted in Oye Jassie.

== Television ==
- Oye Jassie (2013)
