= New Zealand at the 2006 Commonwealth Games =

- CG code: NZL
- CGA: New Zealand Olympic Committee
- Website: www.olympic.org.nz

in Melbourne, Australia
- Competitors: 249 in 19 sports
- Flag bearers: Opening: Hamish Carter; Closing: Greg Yelavich
- Officials: 119
- Medals Ranked 9th: Gold 6 Silver 12 Bronze 13 Total 31

Commonwealth Games appearances (overview)
- 1930; 1934; 1938; 1950; 1954; 1958; 1962; 1966; 1970; 1974; 1978; 1982; 1986; 1990; 1994; 1998; 2002; 2006; 2010; 2014; 2018; 2022; 2026; 2030

New Zealand at the 2006 Commonwealth Games in Melbourne, Victoria, Australia was represented by 249 athletes competing in over 19 disciplines, with 119 officials. This was the largest team that New Zealand had ever sent to a Commonwealth Games.

New Zealand has competed in every Commonwealth Games since the first British Empire Games in 1930, and is one of only six teams to have done so. Selection is the responsibility of the New Zealand Olympic Committee.

New Zealand did not perform nearly as well as expected, recording their worst performance since 1982. They had been expected to return with forty or fifty medals, but won only 31, finishing ninth.

The flag bearer for the opening ceremony was Hamish Carter — the reigning Olympic triathlon champion. At the closing ceremony Greg Yelavich who had competed since the 1986 Games and won the most Commonwealth Games medals (11) of any New Zealander was flagbearer.

== Medals ==
	(gold)	(silver)	(bronze)	Total
New Zealand	6	12	13	31

=== Gold ===
Athletics:

(gold) Valerie Vili, Women's shot put
(gold) Nick Willis, Men's 1500 m

Netball:

(gold) Leana de Bruin, Belinda Colling, Vilimaina Davu, Temepara George, Laura Langman, Jessica Tuki, Anna Rowberry, Anna Scarlett, Maria Tutaia, Irene Van Dyk, Casey Williams & Adine Wilson, Women's Netball

Rugby Sevens:

(gold) Sosene Anesi, Josh Blackie, Tamati Ellison, Nigel Hunt, Tafai Ioasa, Cory Jane, Tanerau Latimer, Liam Messam, Lote Raikabula, Amasio Valence, Alando Soakai & Onosai Tololima-Auva'a, Men's Rugby Sevens

Shooting:

(gold) Graeme Ede, Men's Trap

Swimming:

(gold) Moss Burmester, Men's 200 m Butterfly

=== Silver ===
Athletics:

(silver) Tony Sargisson, Men's 50 km Walk

Badminton:

(silver) Sara Runesten-Petersen & Daniel Shirley, Mixed Doubles

Basketball:

(silver) Ed Book, Dillon Boucher, Pero Cameron, Casey Frank, Paul Henare, Mike Homik, Troy McLean, Aaron Olson, Tony Rampton, Lindsay Tait, Mika Vukona & Paora Winitana, Men's Basketball
(silver) Micaela Cocks, Rebecca Cotton, Aneka Kerr, Donna Loffhagen, Angela Marino, Jessica McCormack, Kate McMeeken-Ruscoe, Lisa Pardon, Charmian Purcell, Jody Tini, Lisa Wallbutton & Nonila Wharemate, Women's Basketball

Cycling:

(silver) Rosara Joseph, Women's Cross Country
(silver) Hayden Roulston, Men's Points Race

Shooting:

(silver) Juliet Etherington, Women's 50 m Rifle Prone
(silver) Gregory Yelavich, Men's 25 m Centre Fire Pistol

Squash:

(silver) Shelley Kitchen & Tamsyn Leevey, Women's Doubles

Swimming:

(silver) Dean Kent, Men's 200 m Individual Medley

Triathlon:

(silver) Bevan Docherty, Men's Individual
(silver) Samantha Warriner, Women's Individual

=== Bronze ===
Athletics:

(bronze) Angela McKee, Women's High Jump

Cycling:

(bronze) Gordon McCauley, Men's Time Trial
(bronze) Hayden Godfrey, Tim Gudsell, Peter Latham, & Marc Ryan, Men's Team Pursuit

Lawn Bowls:

(bronze) Jan Khan & Marina Khan, Women's Pairs

Shooting:

(bronze) Juliet Etherington & Kathryn Mead, Women's 50 m Prone Rifle Pair
(bronze) Teresa Borrell, Nadine Stanton, Women's Double Trap (Pairs)

Squash:

(bronze) Shelley Kitchen, Women's Singles

Swimming:

(bronze) Moss Burmester, Men's 100 m Butterfly
(bronze) Cameron Gibson, Men's 200 m Backstroke
(bronze) Hannah McLean, Women's 200 m Backstroke
(bronze) Lauren Boyle, Alison Fitch, Melissa Ingram & Helen Norfolk, Women's 4 × 200 m Freestyle Relay

Synchronised Swimming:

(bronze) Lisa Daniels & Nina Daniels, Synchronised Swimming Duets

Triathlon:

(bronze) Andrea Hewitt, Women's Individual

Weightlifting:

(bronze) Keisha-Dean Soffe, Women's +75 kg

== New Zealand's Commonwealth Games Team 2006 ==
=== Aquatics ===
==== Swimming ====
Men

Athlete	Events	Heat		Semifinal		Final	
Athlete	Events	Time	Rank	Time	Rank	Time	Rank
Moss Burmester	50 m butterfly	24.64	11 Q	24.73	12	Did not advance	
Moss Burmester	100 m butterfly	53.88	5 Q	53.15	4 Q	52.73	3rd place, bronze medalist(s)
Moss Burmester	200 m butterfly	1:59.87	2 Q	—N/a		1:56.64	1st place, gold medalist(s)
Cameron Gibson	50 m backstroke	26.74	11 Q	26.75	12	Did not advance	
Cameron Gibson	100 m backstroke	58.65	13 Q	Did not start		Did not advance	
Cameron Gibson	200 m backstroke	2:05.30	6 Q	—N/a		2:00.72	3rd place, bronze medalist(s)
Dean Kent	100 m breaststroke	1:04.13	14 Q	1:04.10	15	Did not advance	
Dean Kent	200 m individual medley	2:02.65	1 Q	—N/a		2:01.08	2nd place, silver medalist(s)
Dean Kent	400 m individual medley	4:22.75	3 Q	—N/a		4:18.20	4
Andrew McMillan	200 m freestyle	1:51.01	15	—N/a		Did not advance	
Andrew McMillan	100 m butterfly	56.01	14 Q	55.81	13	Did not advance	
Andrew McMillan	200 m butterfly	2:00.70	5 Q	—N/a		2:00.61	5
Daniel Sharp	50 m EAD freestyle	25.58	5 Q	—N/a		25.81	5
Daniel Sharp	100 m EAD freestyle	58.32	7 Q	—N/a		58.42	7
Glenn Snyders	50 m breaststroke	29.21	=8 Q	29.27	10	Did not advance	
Glenn Snyders	100 m breaststroke	1:03.90	12 Q	1:03.74	14	Did not advance	
Corney Swanepoel	50 m butterfly	24.23	5 Q	24.30	9	Did not advance	
Corney Swanepoel	100 m butterfly	53.94	6 Q	53.77	7 Q	53.14	4
Scott Talbot	50 m backstroke	26.29	6 Q	26.24	8 Q	26.33	8
Scott Talbot	100 m backstroke	57.38	10 Q	56.58	11	Did not advance	
Moss Burmester; Cameron Gibson; Glenn Snyders; Corney Swanepoel*; Scott Talbot	4 × 100 m medley relay	3:46.22	3 Q	—N/a		3:40.75	5

Women

Athlete	Events	Heat		Semifinal		Final	
Athlete	Events	Time	Rank	Time	Rank	Time	Rank
Zoë Baker	50 m breaststroke	31.70	4 Q	31.84	5 Q	31.45	4
Lauren Boyle	100 m freestyle	56.70	10 Q	56.40	9	Did not advance	
Lauren Boyle	200 m freestyle	2:01.11	8 Q	—N/a		2:00.90	8
Annabelle Carey	50 m breaststroke	32.85	10 Q	32.71	10	Did not advance	
Annabelle Carey	100 m breaststroke	1:14.48	13 Q	1:11.99	11	Did not advance	
Nichola Chellingworth	50 m freestyle	26.36	10 Q	26.00	5 Q	25.89	6
Nichola Chellingworth	50 m butterfly	27.51	9 Q	27.22	5 Q	27.67	7
Elizabeth Coster	50 m backstroke	29.70	5 Q	29.29	5 Q	29.48	5
Elizabeth Coster	50 m butterfly	27.38	5 Q	27.38	11	Did not advance	
Elizabeth Coster	100 m butterfly	1:01.17	10 Q	1:00.34	9	Did not advance	
Alison Fitch	50 m freestyle	26.11	6 Q	26.09	7 Q	Disqualified	
Alison Fitch	100 m freestyle	56.18	6 Q	56.06	6 Q	Did not start	
Alison Fitch	200 m freestyle	2:01.69	10	—N/a		Did not advance	
Melissa Ingram	200 m freestyle	2:02.60	12	—N/a		Did not advance	
Melissa Ingram	100 m backstroke	1:03.16	8 Q	1:03.10	9	Did not advance	
Melissa Ingram	200 m backstroke	2:12.34	2 Q	—N/a		2:13.09	6
Hannah McLean	50 m backstroke	29.36	4 Q	28.98	4 Q	28.89	4
Hannah McLean	100 m backstroke	1:02.52	4 Q	1:02.46	4 Q	1:01.71	4
Hannah McLean	200 m backstroke	2:14.37	5 Q	—N/a		2:12.47	3rd place, bronze medalist(s)
Helen Norfolk	100 m freestyle	57.59	15 Q	57.10	12	Did not advance	
Helen Norfolk	200 m individual medley	2:16.93	4 Q	—N/a		2:16.49	5
Helen Norfolk	400 m individual medley	4:51.46	4 Q	—N/a		4:48.09	5
Georgina Toomey	50 m freestyle	27.46	=18	Did not advance			
Georgina Toomey	50 m butterfly	27.74	13 Q	27.71	13	Did not advance	
Georgina Toomey	100 m butterfly	1:03.13	12 Q	1:02.75	13	Did not advance	
Lauren Boyle; Alison Fitch; Hannah McLean; Helen Norfolk	4 × 100 m freestyle relay	—N/a				3:43.49	4
Lauren Boyle; Alison Fitch; Melissa Ingram; Helen Norfolk	4 × 200 m freestyle relay	—N/a				8:02.20	3rd place, bronze medalist(s)
Annabelle Carey; Elizabeth Coster; Alison Fitch; Hannah McLean	4 × 100 m medley relay	—N/a				4:06.30	4

==== Synchronised swimming ====
- Lisa Daniels
- Nina Daniels

=== Athletics ===
- Michael Aish
- Jane Arnott
- Craig Barrett
- Adrian Blincoe
- Matthew Brown
- Chantal Brunner
- Sarah Cowley
- Fiona Crombie
- James Dolphin
- Chris Donaldson
- David Falealili
- Stuart Farquhar
- Beatrice Faumuina
- Paul Hamblyn
- Melina Hamilton
- Liza Hunter-Galvin
- Kate McIlroy
- Angela McKee
- Rebecca Moore
- James Mortimer
- Brent Newdick
- Tony Sargisson
- Jason Stewart
- Carl van der Speck
- Valerie Vili
- Rebecca Wardell
- Nick Willis

=== Badminton ===
- Geoff Bellingham
- Rebecca Bellingham
- Craig Cooper
- John Gordon
- Nicole Gordon
- Rachel Hindley
- John Moody
- Sara Petersen
- Daniel Shirley
- Lianne Shirley

=== Basketball ===
==== Men's team competition ====
- Ed Book
- Dillon Boucher
- Pero Cameron
- Casey Frank
- Paul Henare
- Mike Homik
- Troy McLean
- Aaron Olson
- Tony Rampton
- Lindsay Tait
- Mika Vukona
- Paora Winitana

==== Women's team competition ====
- Micaela Cocks
- Rebecca Cotton
- Aneka Kerr
- Donna Loffhagen
- Angela Marino
- Jessica McCormack
- Kate McMeeken-Ruscoe
- Lisa Pardon
- Charmian Purcell
- Jody Tini
- Lisa Wallbutton
- Nonila Wharemate

=== Boxing ===
- Kahukura Bentson
- Joseph Blackbourn
- Carl Commons
- Jamie Garder
- Soulan Pownceby
- Gregory Weenink

=== Cycling ===
==== Mountain biking ====
- Clinton Avery
- Sonia Foote
- Rosara Joseph
- Kashi Leuchs
- Mike Northcott
- Robyn Wong

==== Road cycling ====
- Tamara Boyd
- Toni Bradshaw
- Melissa Holt
- Logan Hutchings
- Michelle Hyland
- Gordon McCauley
- Glen Mitchell
- Robin Reid
- Hayden Roulston
- Alison Shanks
- Sarah Ulmer
- Susie Wood
- Lauren Byrne (Withdrew from choking incident)

==== Track cycling ====
- Jason Allen
- Richard Bowker
- Fiona Carswell
- Hayden Godfrey
- Justin Grace
- Timothy Gudsell
- Greg Henderson
- Joanne Kiesanowski
- Peter Latham
- Marc Ryan
- Nathan Seddon
- Catherine Sell
- Adam Stewart
- Paddy Walker
- Elisabeth Williams

=== Hockey ===
==== Men's team ====
- Darren Smith
- Simon Child
- Blair Hopping
- Dean Couzins
- Ryan Archibald
- Bradley Shaw
- Bevan Hari
- Paul Woolford
- Kyle Pontifex
- Phil Burrows
- Hayden Shaw
- James Nation
- Bryce Collins
- Gareth Brooks
- Shea McAleese
- Ben Collier

Head coach: Kevin Towns

==== Women's team ====
- Kayla Sharland
- Emily Naylor
- Krystal Forgesson
- Honor Dillon
- Lizzy Igasan
- Stacey Carr
- Suzie Muirhead
- Beth Jurgeleit
- Clarissa Eshuis
- Diana Weavers
- Jane Maley
- Frances Kreft
- Kate Mahon
- Anita Wawatai
- Charlotte Harrison
- Michelle Hollands

Head coach: Ian Rutledge

=== Gymnastics ===
- Belinda Castles
- Teegan Metcalfe
- Olivia Jobsis
- Hayden Power

=== Lawn Bowls ===
- Rowan Brassey
- Gary Lawson
- Russell Meyer
- Richard Girvan
- Justin Goodwin
- Jamie Hill
- Jo Edwards
- Jan Khan
- Marina Khan
- Serena Mathews
- Sharon Sims
- Val Smith

Head coach: Peter Belliss

=== Netball ===
With a team captained by Adine Wilson and coached by Ruth Aitken, New Zealand won the gold medal in the netball at the 2006 Commonwealth Games. It was their first gold medal in the netball tournament. In the final they defeated Australia 60–55.

Pool 1

Friday 17 March; 15:00 (UTC+11)	Report; Stats	Saint Vincent and the Grenadines	31–98	New Zealand	Umpires: Bill Alexander; Jackie Jashari; Reserve umpire: Michelle Phippard
Friday 17 March; 15:00 (UTC+11)	Report; Stats	Scoring by quarter: 3-29, 12-22, 5-27, 11-20			Umpires: Bill Alexander; Jackie Jashari; Reserve umpire: Michelle Phippard
Friday 17 March; 15:00 (UTC+11)	Report; Stats	Galeine Gordon 27/34 (79%); Samathea Christopher 2/3 (67%); Nicole Sandy 2/4 (50%)		Irene van Dyk 48/49 (98%); Maria Tutaia 24/26 (92%); Belinda Colling 18/21 (86%); Jessica Tuki 8/16 (50%)	Umpires: Bill Alexander; Jackie Jashari; Reserve umpire: Michelle Phippard

Sunday 19 March; 18:30 (UTC+11)	Report; Stats	New Zealand	80–26	Fiji	Umpires: Marion Johnson-Hurley; Michelle Phippard; Reserve umpire: Anne Abraitis
Sunday 19 March; 18:30 (UTC+11)	Report; Stats	Scoring by quarter: 17-7, 24-4, 17-8, 22-7			Umpires: Marion Johnson-Hurley; Michelle Phippard; Reserve umpire: Anne Abraitis
Sunday 19 March; 18:30 (UTC+11)	Report; Stats	Irene van Dyk 32/35 (91%); Maria Tutaia 32/38 (84%); Jessica Tuki 9/13 (69%); Belinda Colling 7/8 (88%)		Taraima Rara 10/15 (67%); Matelita Shaw 9/12 (75%); Laniana Tuisasa 6/8 (75%); Maria Bereso 1/4 (25%)	Umpires: Marion Johnson-Hurley; Michelle Phippard; Reserve umpire: Anne Abraitis

Tuesday 21 March; 18:30 (UTC+11)	Report; Stats	New Zealand	74–37	South Africa	Umpires: Carolene Logan; Chris Campbell; Reserve umpire: Marion Johnson-Hurley
Tuesday 21 March; 18:30 (UTC+11)	Report; Stats	Scoring by quarter: 23-11, 23-5, 14-11, 14-10			Umpires: Carolene Logan; Chris Campbell; Reserve umpire: Marion Johnson-Hurley
Tuesday 21 March; 18:30 (UTC+11)	Report; Stats	Irene van Dyk 44/48 (92%); Belinda Colling 16/21 (76%); Maria Tutaia 14/19 (74%)		Sindisiwe Gumede 30/35 (86%); Christine Markgraaff 6/8 (75%); Lizanne Helmand 1/3 (33%)	Umpires: Carolene Logan; Chris Campbell; Reserve umpire: Marion Johnson-Hurley

Wednesday 22 March; 20:30 (UTC+11)	Report; Stats	New Zealand	55–40	England	Umpires: Sharon Kelly; Chris Campbell; Reserve umpire: Jacqui Jashari
Wednesday 22 March; 20:30 (UTC+11)	Report; Stats	Scoring by quarter: 15-9, 12-12, 15-10, 13-9			Umpires: Sharon Kelly; Chris Campbell; Reserve umpire: Jacqui Jashari
Wednesday 22 March; 20:30 (UTC+11)	Report; Stats	Irene van Dyk 46/49 (94%); Belinda Colling 9/12 (75%)		Louisa Brownfield 17/18 (94%); Pamela Cookey 14/20 (70%); Abby Teare 5/9 (56%); Rachel Dunn 4/5 (80%)	Umpires: Sharon Kelly; Chris Campbell; Reserve umpire: Jacqui Jashari

Thursday 23 March; 16:00 (UTC+11)	Stats	Malawi	39–67	New Zealand	Umpires: Bill Alexander; Anne Abraitis; Reserve umpire: Marion Johnson-Hurley
Thursday 23 March; 16:00 (UTC+11)	Stats	Scoring by quarter: 10-18, 7-19, 6-20, 16-10			Umpires: Bill Alexander; Anne Abraitis; Reserve umpire: Marion Johnson-Hurley
Thursday 23 March; 16:00 (UTC+11)	Stats	Linda Magombo 36/42 (86%); Emma Mzagada 2/4 (50%); Peace Chawinga 1/2 (50%)		Irene van Dyk 38/43 (88%); Maria Tutaia 19/21 (90%); Belinda Colling 6/6 (100%); Jessica Tuki 4/9 (44%)	Umpires: Bill Alexander; Anne Abraitis; Reserve umpire: Marion Johnson-Hurley

Table

Pos	Team	P	W	D	L	GF	GA	GD	Pts
1	New Zealand	5	5	0	0	374	173	+201	10
2	England	5	4	0	1	308	196	+112	8
3	Malawi	5	3	0	2	262	282	-20	6
4	South Africa	5	2	0	3	264	283	-19	4
5	Fiji	5	1	0	4	228	293	-65	2
6	Saint Vincent and the Grenadines	5	0	0	5	171	380	-209	0

Qualified for Semi-finals
Qualified for Classification

Semi-final

Saturday 25 March; 18:30 (UTC+11)	Report; Stats	New Zealand	61–41	Jamaica	Umpires: Sharon Kelly; Michelle Phippard; Reserve umpire: Jacqui Jashari
Saturday 25 March; 18:30 (UTC+11)	Report; Stats	Scoring by quarter: 18-7, 14-10, 16-11, 13-13			Umpires: Sharon Kelly; Michelle Phippard; Reserve umpire: Jacqui Jashari
Saturday 25 March; 18:30 (UTC+11)	Report; Stats	Irene van Dyk 48/51 (94%); Belinda Colling 10/14 (71%); Maria Tutaia 3/5 (60%)		Elaine Davis 27/31 (87%); Simone Forbes 14/18 (78%)	Umpires: Sharon Kelly; Michelle Phippard; Reserve umpire: Jacqui Jashari

Gold medal match

Sunday 26 March; 16:00 (UTC+11)	Stats	New Zealand	60–55	Australia	Umpires: Chris Campbell; Marion Johnson-Hurley; Reserve umpire: Bill Alexander
Sunday 26 March; 16:00 (UTC+11)	Stats	Scoring by quarter: 19-14, 17-15, 10-12, 14-14			Umpires: Chris Campbell; Marion Johnson-Hurley; Reserve umpire: Bill Alexander
Sunday 26 March; 16:00 (UTC+11)	Stats	Irene van Dyk 44/49 (90%); Belinda Colling 16/18 (89%)		Catherine Cox 31/38 (82%); Sharelle McMahon 22/28 (79%); Susan Pratley 2/2 (100%)	Umpires: Chris Campbell; Marion Johnson-Hurley; Reserve umpire: Bill Alexander

Squad

New Zealand roster
Players
Coaches

Name	Pos	DOB	Height	Club	Nat	Caps
Belinda Colling	GA, GS, WA	12 September 1975 (aged 30)	1.78 m (5 ft 10 in)	Southern Sting
Vilimaina Davu	GK	15 January 1977 (aged 29)	1.90 m (6 ft 3 in)	Canterbury Flames
Leana de Bruin	GD, GK	9 July 1977 (aged 28)	1.90 m (6 ft 3 in)	Northern Force
Temepara George	C, WA	23 October 1975 (aged 30)	1.70 m (5 ft 7 in)	Northern Force
Laura Langman	C, WD	16 April 1986 (aged 19)	1.73 m (5 ft 8 in)	Waikato Bay of Plenty Magic
Anna Rowberry	GD	31 March 1976 (aged 29)	1.76 m (5 ft 9 in)	Auckland Diamonds
Anna Scarlett	GK, GD, WD	15 April 1983 (aged 22)	1.87 m (6 ft 2 in)	Auckland Diamonds
Jessica Tuki	GK, WA	28 October 1987 (aged 18)	1.85 m (6 ft 1 in)	Western Flyers
Maria Tutaia	GA, GS	18 February 1987 (aged 19)	1.88 m (6 ft 2 in)	Auckland Diamonds
Irene van Dyk	GS, GA	21 June 1972 (aged 33)	1.90 m (6 ft 3 in)	Waikato Bay of Plenty Magic
Casey Williams	GD, GK	19 June 1985 (aged 20)	1.88 m (6 ft 2 in)	Waikato Bay of Plenty Magic
Adine Wilson (c)	WA, C, GA	8 June 1979 (aged 26)	1.80 m (5 ft 11 in)	Southern Sting

Head coach

- Ruth Aitken

Notes

- (c) – Captain
- (cc) – Co-captain
- (vc) – Vice-captain
- – Injury / maternity leave
- (TRP) – Temporary Replacement Player

=== Rugby Sevens ===
- Sosene Anesi
- Josh Blackie
- Tamati Ellison
- Nigel Hunt
- Tafai Ioasa
- Cory Jane
- Tanerau Latimer
- Liam Messam
- Lote Raikabula
- Amasio Valence
- Alando Soakai
- Onosai Tololima-Auva'a

=== Shooting ===
(incomplete)

- Teresa Borrell
- Graeme Ede
- Juliet Etherington
- Kathryn Mead
- John Snowden
- Nadine Stanton
- Greg Yelavich

=== Squash ===
- Louise Crome
- Campbell Grayson
- Shelley Kitchen
- Martin Knight
- Tamsyn Leevey
- Callum O'Brien
- Lara Petera
- Glen Wilson

=== Table Tennis ===
- Brad Chen
- Andrew Hubbard
- Jenny Hung
- Peter Jackson
- Shane Laugeson
- Karen Li
- Sophie Shu
- Annie Yang

=== Triathlon ===
- Hamish Carter
- Bevan Docherty
- Kris Gemmell
- Andrea Hewitt
- Debbie Tanner
- Samantha Warriner

=== Weightlifting ===
- Grant Cavit
- Richard Patterson
- Keisha-Dean Soffe
- Mark Spooner

== Note ==
* – athletes with known injuries at time of selection who are required to prove full fitness by 15 January 2006.
