= Swimming at the 2006 Commonwealth Games – Women's 100 metre freestyle =

== Women's 100 m Freestyle - Final ==
Pos.	Lane	Athlete	R.T.	50 m	100 m	Tbh.
	5	(Australia) Libby Lenton (AUS)	0.74	25.77; 25.77	53.54 (GR); 27.77	
	4	(Australia) Jodie Henry (AUS)	0.81	26.16; 26.16	53.78; 27.62	0.24
	3	(Australia) Alice Mills (AUS)	0.80	26.29; 26.29	54.31; 28.02	0.77
4	2	(England) Francesca Halsall (ENG)	0.76	26.74; 26.74	55.40; 28.66	1.86
4	6	(Canada) Erica Morningstar (CAN)	0.76	26.54; 26.54	55.40; 28.86	1.86
6	1	(England) Rosalind Brett (ENG)	0.78	27.00; 27.00	56.02; 29.02	2.48
7	8	(Canada) Geneviève Saumur (CAN)	0.80	27.13; 27.13	56.29; 29.16	2.75
8	7	(South Africa) Lauren Roets (RSA)	0.73	26.89; 26.89	56.33; 29.44	2.79

== Women's 100 m Freestyle - Semifinals ==
=== Women's 100 m Freestyle - Semifinal 01 ===
Pos.	Lane	Athlete	R.T.	50 m	100 m	Tbh.
1	4	(Australia) Alice Mills (AUS)	0.78	26.44; 26.44	55.08; 28.64	
2	5	(Canada) Erica Morningstar (CAN)	0.90	26.98; 26.98	55.63; 28.65	0.55
3	3	(New Zealand) Alison Fitch (NZL)	0.84	27.12; 27.12	56.06; 28.94	0.98
4	2	(New Zealand) Lauren Boyle (NZL)	0.85	27.55; 27.55	56.40; 28.85	1.32
5	6	(Canada) Geneviève Saumur (CAN)	0.79	27.46; 27.46	56.76; 29.30	1.68
6	1	(New Zealand) Helen Norfolk (NZL)	0.82	27.66; 27.66	57.10; 29.44	2.02
7	7	(Canada) Sophie Simard (CAN)	0.80	28.04; 28.04	57.11; 29.07	2.03
8	8	(The Bahamas) Alana Dillette (BAH)	0.74	28.36; 28.36	59.78; 31.42	4.70

=== Women's 100 m Freestyle - Semifinal 02 ===
Pos.	Lane	Athlete	R.T.	50 m	100 m	Tbh.
1	4	(Australia) Jodie Henry (AUS)	0.80	26.25; 26.25	54.11 (GR); 27.86	
2	5	(Australia) Libby Lenton (AUS)	0.74	25.84; 25.84	54.68; 28.84	0.57
3	6	(England) Francesca Halsall (ENG)	0	26.89; 26.89	55.86; 28.97	1.75
4	3	(South Africa) Lauren Roets (RSA)	0	26.81; 26.81	56.12; 29.31	2.01
5	2	(England) Rosalind Brett (ENG)	0.79	27.11; 27.11	56.20; 29.09	2.09
6	7	(England) Amy Smith (ENG)	0	27.35; 27.35	57.03; 29.68	2.92
7	1	(Northern Ireland) Julie Douglas (NIR)	0.74	27.63; 27.63	57.16; 29.53	3.05
8	8	(Cyprus) Anna Stylianou (CYP)	0	28.20; 28.20	58.81; 30.61	4.70

== Women's 100 m Freestyle - Heats ==
=== Women's 100 m Freestyle - Heat 01 ===
Pos.	Lane	Athlete	R.T.	50 m	100 m	Tbh.
1	5	(Malaysia) Lai Kwan Chui (MAS)	0.83	29.71; 29.71	1:01.07; 31.36	
2	4	(Maldives) Aminath Rouya Hussain (MDV)	0.89	32.20; 32.20	1:09.40; 37.20	8.33
3	6	(Uganda) Olivia Aya Nakitanda (UGA)	0.97	33.49; 33.49	1:11.17; 37.68	10.10
DNS	3	(Trinidad and Tobago) Linda McEachrane (TRI)				

=== Women's 100 m Freestyle - Heat 02 ===
Pos.	Lane	Athlete	R.T.	50 m	100 m	Tbh.
1	5	(Cayman Islands) Jennifer Powell (CAY)	0.77	30.57; 30.57	1:02.75; 32.18	
2	3	(Papua New Guinea) Nicole Ellsworth (PNG)	0.89	30.30; 30.30	1:02.87; 32.57	0.12
3	4	(Namibia) Jonay Briedenhann (NAM)	0.70	30.28; 30.28	1:02.97; 32.69	0.22
4	7	(Pakistan) Rubab Raza (PAK)	0.90	31.18; 31.18	1:05.27; 34.09	2.52
5	8	(Pakistan) Kiran Khan (PAK)	0.98	31.27; 31.27	1:06.07; 34.80	3.32
6	1	(Papua New Guinea) Judith Meauri (PNG)	0.91	32.33; 32.33	1:06.58; 34.25	3.83
7	6	(Sri Lanka) Chathuri Abeykoon (SRI)	0.74	31.17; 31.17	1:06.71; 35.54	3.96
8	2	(Sri Lanka) Migali Gunatilake (SRI)	0.81	31.95; 31.95	1:07.05; 35.10	4.30

=== Women's 100 m Freestyle - Heat 03 ===
Pos.	Lane	Athlete	R.T.	50 m	100 m	Tbh.
1	6	(Guernsey) Gail Strobridge (GUE)	0.85	29.04; 29.04	59.94; 30.90	
2	1	(Isle of Man) Emily-Claire Crookall-nixon (IOM)	0.76	28.68; 28.68	59.98; 31.30	0.04
3	2	(Jamaica) Tamara Swaby (JAM)	0.70	29.60; 29.60	1:00.95; 31.35	1.01
4	7	(Barbados) Alexis Jordan (BAR)	0.77	29.04; 29.04	1:01.05; 32.01	1.11
5	5	(Fiji) Rachel Ah Koy (FIJ)	0.61	29.25; 29.25	1:01.08; 31.83	1.14
6	3	(Gibraltar) Elaine Reyes (GIB)	0.80	30.03; 30.03	1:01.46; 31.43	1.52
7	4	(Zambia) Jakie Wellman (ZAM)	0.75	29.24; 29.24	1:01.85; 32.61	1.91
8	8	(Mozambique) Ximene Gomes (MOZ)	0.77	29.53; 29.53	1:02.16; 32.63	2.22

=== Women's 100 m Freestyle - Heat 04 ===
Pos.	Lane	Athlete	R.T.	50 m	100 m	Tbh.
1	4	(Australia) Alice Mills (AUS)	0.80	26.59; 26.59	54.80 (GR); 28.21	
2	5	(England) Francesca Halsall (ENG)	0.76	26.83; 26.83	56.35; 29.52	1.55
3	3	(New Zealand) Lauren Boyle (NZL)	0.86	27.65; 27.65	56.70; 29.05	1.90
4	2	(Northern Ireland) Julie Douglas (NIR)	0.73	27.44; 27.44	57.03; 29.59	2.23
5	6	(New Zealand) Helen Norfolk (NZL)	0.81	28.01; 28.01	57.59; 29.58	2.79
6	7	(Singapore) Shu Yong Ho (SIN)	0.81	28.54; 28.54	59.78; 31.24	4.98
7	8	(Mauritius) Mélissa Vincent (MRI)	0.72	29.07; 29.07	1:00.85; 31.78	6.05
8	1	(Papua New Guinea) Anna-Lisa Mopio-jane (PNG)	0.76	28.50; 28.50	1:00.95; 32.45	6.15

=== Women's 100 m Freestyle - Heat 05 ===
Pos.	Lane	Athlete	R.T.	50 m	100 m	Tbh.
1	4	(Australia) Jodie Henry (AUS)	0.78	26.28; 26.28	54.52 (GR); 28.24	
2	2	(South Africa) Lauren Roets (RSA)	0.71	26.79; 26.79	55.97; 29.18	1.45
3	5	(Canada) Geneviève Saumur (CAN)	0.81	27.30; 27.30	56.41; 29.11	1.89
4	3	(England) Rosalind Brett (ENG)	0.82	27.29; 27.29	56.44; 29.15	1.92
5	6	(Cyprus) Anna Stylianou (CYP)	0.76	27.97; 27.97	58.65; 30.68	4.13
6	8	(The Bahamas) Alana Dillette (BAH)	0.74	28.78; 28.78	59.55; 30.77	5.03
7	7	(South Africa) Rene Mouton (RSA)	0.77	28.46; 28.46	59.62; 31.16	5.10
8	1	(Jamaica) Alia Atkinson (JAM)	0.73	28.70; 28.70	1:00.13; 31.43	5.61

=== Women's 100 m Freestyle - Heat 06 ===
Pos.	Lane	Athlete	R.T.	50 m	100 m	Tbh.
1	4	(Australia) Libby Lenton (AUS)	0.78	26.22; 26.22	55.04; 28.82	
2	5	(Canada) Erica Morningstar (CAN)	0.95	26.99; 26.99	55.86; 28.87	0.82
3	3	(New Zealand) Alison Fitch (NZL)	0.85	27.12; 27.12	56.18; 29.06	1.14
4	2	(England) Amy Smith (ENG)	0.84	27.47; 27.47	56.71; 29.24	1.67
5	6	(Canada) Sophie Simard (CAN)	0.82	27.55; 27.55	56.83; 29.28	1.79
6	7	(South Africa) Lize-Mari Retief (RSA)	0.75	27.00; 27.00	57.56; 30.56	2.52
7	8	(Singapore) Chui Bin ONG (SIN)	0.73	29.00; 29.00	59.92; 30.92	4.88
8	1	(Singapore) Ruyu HO (SIN)	0.73	28.85; 28.85	1:00.00; 31.15	4.96
