= Swimming at the 2006 Commonwealth Games – Women's 50 metre freestyle =

Women's 50 metre freestyle at the 2006 Commonwealth Games
- Venue: Melbourne Sports and Aquatic Centre
- Dates: 19 March (heats, semifinals); 20 March (final)
- Competitors: 47
- Winning time: 24.61

Medalists
gold medal	Libby Lenton	Australia
silver medal	Jodie Henry	Australia
bronze medal	Alice Mills	Australia

== Women's 50 m Freestyle - Final ==
Pos.	Lane	Athlete	R.T.	50 m	Tbh.
	3	(Australia) Libby Lenton (AUS)	0.75	24.61 (GR)	
	4	(Australia) Jodie Henry (AUS)	0.79	24.72	0.11
	5	(Australia) Alice Mills (AUS)	0.76	25.03	0.42
4	7	(Canada) Victoria Poon (CAN)	0.81	25.65	1.04
5	6	(South Africa) Lauren Roets (RSA)	0.67	25.85	1.24
6	2	(New Zealand) Nichola Chellingworth (NZL)	0.78	25.89	1.28
7	8	(Canada) Erica Morningstar (CAN)	0.92	26.22	1.61
DSQ	1	(New Zealand) Alison Fitch (NZL)			

== Women's 50 m Freestyle - Semifinals ==
=== Women's 50 m Freestyle - Semifinal 01 ===
Pos.	Lane	Athlete	R.T.	50 m	Tbh.
1	4	(Australia) Alice Mills (AUS)	0.78	25.40	
2	5	(Australia) Libby Lenton (AUS)	0.75	25.50	0.10
3	2	(New Zealand) Nichola Chellingworth (NZL)	0.81	26.00	0.60
4	3	(New Zealand) Alison Fitch (NZL)	0.84	26.09	0.69
5	7	(South Africa) Lize-Mari Retief (RSA)	0.71	26.19	0.79
6	6	(Northern Ireland) Julie Douglas (NIR)	0.72	26.28	0.88
7	8	(South Africa) Rene Mouton (RSA)	0.71	26.86	1.46
8	1	(India) Shikha Tandon (IND)	0.80	27.35	1.95

=== Women's 50 m Freestyle - Semifinal 02 ===
Pos.	Lane	Athlete	R.T.	50 m	Tbh.
1	4	(Australia) Jodie Henry (AUS)	0.85	25.32	
2	5	(South Africa) Lauren Roets (RSA)	0.75	25.75	0.43
3	6	(Canada) Victoria Poon (CAN)	0.84	26.07	0.75
4	2	(Canada) Erica Morningstar (CAN)	0.90	26.17	0.85
5	3	(England) Francesca Halsall (ENG)	0.81	26.34	1.02
6	7	(England) Amy Smith (ENG)	0.86	26.44	1.12
7	8	(Canada) Geneviève Saumur (CAN)	0.85	26.89	1.57
8	1	(Malaysia) Lai Kwan Chui (MAS)	0.82	27.12	1.80

== Women's 50 m Freestyle - Heats ==
=== Women's 50 m Freestyle - Heat 01 ===
Pos.	Lane	Athlete	R.T.	50 m	Tbh.
1	6	(Malaysia) Lai Kwan Chui (MAS)	0.78	27.07	
2	1	(Uganda) Olivia Aya Nakitanda (UGA)	0.89	30.00	2.93
3	4	(Kenya) Nasra Nandha (KEN)	0.78	30.68	3.61
4	3	(Maldives) Aminath Rouya Hussain (MDV)	0.95	31.05	3.98
5	5	(Bangladesh) Sobura Khatun (BAN)	0.76	31.09	4.02
6	2	(Antigua and Barbuda) Christal Clashing O'Reilly (ANT)	0.92	32.13	5.06
DNS	7	(Trinidad and Tobago) Linda McEachrane (TRI)			

=== Women's 50 m Freestyle - Heat 02 ===
Pos.	Lane	Athlete	R.T.	50 m	Tbh.
1	4	(Mozambique) Ximene Gomes (MOZ)	0.80	28.76	
2	1	(Sri Lanka) Mayumi Raheem (SRI)	0.79	29.22	0.46
3	8	(Papua New Guinea) Nicole Ellsworth (PNG)	0.89	29.38	0.62
4	6	(Gibraltar) Rachel Fortunato (GIB)	0.79	29.46	0.70
5	3	(Pakistan) Rubab Raza (PAK)	0.84	29.79	1.03
6	5	(Papua New Guinea) Judith Meauri (PNG)	0.85	29.92	1.16
7	2	(Sri Lanka) Chathuri Abeykoon (SRI)	0.77	30.04	1.28
8	7	(Pakistan) Kiran Khan (PAK)	0.97	30.93	2.17

=== Women's 50 m Freestyle - Heat 03 ===
Pos.	Lane	Athlete	R.T.	50 m	Tbh.
1	7	(Guernsey) Gail Strobridge (GUE)	0.75	28.01	
2	2	(Isle of Man) Emily-Claire Crookall-nixon (IOM)	0.73	28.21	0.20
2	4	(Mauritius) Mélissa Vincent (MRI)	0.73	28.21	0.20
4	5	(Bermuda) Kiera Aitken (BER)	0.72	28.25	0.24
5	3	(Zambia) Jakie Wellman (ZAM)	0.70	28.30	0.29
6	6	(Cayman Islands) Jennifer Powell (CAY)	0.78	28.41	0.40
7	8	(Namibia) Jonay Briedenhann (NAM)	0.74	28.93	0.92
8	1	(Gibraltar) Elaine Reyes (GIB)	0.77	29.03	1.02

=== Women's 50 m Freestyle - Heat 04 ===
Pos.	Lane	Athlete	R.T.	50 m	Tbh.
1	4	(Australia) Jodie Henry (AUS)	0.82	25.38	
2	6	(South Africa) Lauren Roets (RSA)	0.72	25.64	0.26
3	2	(Northern Ireland) Julie Douglas (NIR)	0.72	26.30	0.92
4	3	(Canada) Erica Morningstar (CAN)	0.91	26.35	0.97
5	5	(Cyprus) Anna Stylianou (CYP)	0.77	27.46	2.08
6	1	(Singapore) Ruth Ho (SIN)	0.73	27.51	2.13
7	7	(Jamaica) Alia Atkinson (JAM)	0.74	28.04	2.66
8	8	(Jamaica) Tamara Swaby (JAM)	0.72	28.14	2.76

=== Women's 50 m Freestyle - Heat 05 ===
Pos.	Lane	Athlete	R.T.	50 m	Tbh.
1	4	(Australia) Alice Mills (AUS)	0.81	25.43	
2	5	(England) Francesca Halsall (ENG)	0.73	26.03	0.60
3	3	(New Zealand) Alison Fitch (NZL)	0.85	26.11	0.68
4	6	(England) Amy Smith (ENG)	0.84	26.61	1.18
5	7	(India) Shikha Tandon (IND)	0.82	27.28	1.85
6	1	(Canada) Geneviève Saumur (CAN)	0.81	27.33	1.90
7	2	(Singapore) Shu Yong Ho (SIN)	0.82	27.45	2.02
8	8	(Barbados) Alexis Jordan (BAR)	0.78	28.18	2.75

=== Women's 50 m Freestyle - Heat 06 ===
Pos.	Lane	Athlete	R.T.	50 m	Tbh.
1	4	(Australia) Libby Lenton (AUS)	0.76	25.88	
2	6	(Canada) Victoria Poon (CAN)	0.89	26.25	0.37
3	5	(New Zealand) Nichola Chellingworth (NZL)	0.84	26.36	0.48
4	7	(South Africa) Lize-Mari Retief (RSA)	0.76	26.72	0.84
5	1	(South Africa) Rene Mouton (RSA)	0.72	27.35	1.47
6	2	(New Zealand) Georgina Toomey (NZL)	0.83	27.46	1.58
7	8	(Papua New Guinea) Anna-Liza Mopio-Jane (PNG)	0.76	27.69	1.81
DNS	3	(Singapore) Joscelin Yeo (SIN)			
