= Swimming at the 2006 Commonwealth Games – Women's 50 metre backstroke =

== Women's 50m Backstroke - Final ==
Pos.	Lane	Athlete	R.T.	50m	Tbh.
	5	(Australia) Sophie Edington (AUS)	0.62	28.42 (=GR)	
	4	(Australia) Giaan Rooney (AUS)	0.69	28.43	0.01
	3	(Australia) Tayliah Zimmer (AUS)	0.64	28.71	0.29
4	6	(New Zealand) Hannah McLean (NZL)	0.87	28.89	0.47
5	2	(New Zealand) Elizabeth Coster (NZL)	0.57	29.48	1.06
6	7	(Canada) Landice Yestrau (CAN)	0.67	29.75	1.33
7	1	(Bermuda) Kiera Aitken (BER)	0.67	30.00	1.58
8	8	(England) Katy Sexton (ENG)	0.66	30.05	1.63

== Women's 50m Backstroke - Semifinals ==
=== Women's 50m Backstroke - Semifinal 01 ===
Pos.	Lane	Athlete	R.T.	50m	Tbh.
1	4	(Australia) Sophie Edington (AUS)	0.67	28.79	
2	5	(New Zealand) Hannah McLean (NZL)	0.72	28.98	0.19
3	3	(Canada) Landice Yestrau (CAN)	0.68	29.84	1.05
4	2	(England) Katy Sexton (ENG)	0.66	30.12	1.33
5	6	(Singapore) Hiang Yuet Ng (SIN)	0.55	30.62	1.83
6	7	(The Bahamas) Alana Dillette (BAH)	0.55	30.90	2.11
7	1	(India) Shikha Tandon (IND)	0.70	31.53	2.74
8	8	(Isle of Man) Emily-Claire Crookall-nixon (IOM)	0.59	32.93	4.14

=== Women's 50m Backstroke - Semifinal 02 ===
Pos.	Lane	Athlete	R.T.	50m	Tbh.
1	4	(Australia) Giaan Rooney (AUS)	0.72	28.42 (GR)	
2	5	(Australia) Tayliah Zimmer (AUS)	0.64	28.97	0.55
3	3	(New Zealand) Elizabeth Coster (NZL)	0.60	29.29	0.87
4	6	(Bermuda) Kiera Aitken (BER)	0.66	29.99	1.57
5	2	(Canada) Marie-Pier Couillard (CAN)	0.59	30.69	2.27
6	7	(South Africa) Chanelle Van Wyk (RSA)	0.65	30.74	2.32
7	1	(Malaysia) Lai Kwan Chui (MAS)	0.62	31.35	2.93
8	8	(Northern Ireland) Melanie Nocher (NIR)	0.61	31.46	3.04

== Women's 50m Backstroke - Heats ==
=== Women's 50m Backstroke - Heat 01 ===
Pos.	Lane	Athlete	R.T.	50m	Tbh.
1	6	(Malaysia) Lai Kwan Chui (MAS)	0.61	31.32	
2	2	(Sri Lanka) Prabha Dharmadasa (SRI)	0.58	34.21	2.89
3	4	(Papua New Guinea) Judith Meauri (PNG)	0.72	35.32	4.00
4	5	(Bangladesh) Sobura Khatun (BAN)	0.63	36.81	5.49
5	7	(Uganda) Natasha Ratter (UGA)	0.68	38.52	7.20
6	3	(Maldives) Mariyam Ali (MDV)	0.75	39.12	7.80

=== Women's 50m Backstroke - Heat 02 ===
Pos.	Lane	Athlete	R.T.	50m	Tbh.
1	4	(Australia) Tayliah Zimmer (AUS)	0.64	29.22	
2	3	(Canada) Marie-Pier Couillard (CAN)	0.60	30.61	1.39
3	5	(England) Katy Sexton (ENG)	0.69	30.62	1.40
4	2	(India) Shikha Tandon (IND)	0.66	31.52	2.30
5	1	(Zambia) Ellen Hight (ZAM)	0.62	32.74	3.52
6	7	(Gibraltar) Rachel Fortunato (GIB)	0.67	33.38	4.16
7	8	(Pakistan) Rubab Raza (PAK)	0.68	34.58	5.36
DNS	6	(Singapore) Tao Li (SIN)			

=== Women's 50m Backstroke - Heat 03 ===
Pos.	Lane	Athlete	R.T.	50m	Tbh.
1	4	(Australia) Sophie Edington (AUS)	0.67	29.21	
2	5	(New Zealand) Elizabeth Coster (NZL)	0.62	29.70	0.49
3	3	(Canada) Landice Yestrau (CAN)	0.68	29.94	0.73
4	2	(Singapore) Hiang Yuet Ng (SIN)	0.56	30.55	1.34
5	7	(Northern Ireland) Melanie Nocher (NIR)	0.62	31.54	2.33
6	1	(Isle of Man) Emily-Claire Crookall-nixon (IOM)	0.60	32.65	3.44
7	8	(Pakistan) Kiran Khan (PAK)	0.76	33.83	4.62
DNS	6	(New Zealand) Melissa Ingram (NZL)			

=== Women's 50m Backstroke - Heat 04 ===
Pos.	Lane	Athlete	R.T.	50m	Tbh.
1	4	(Australia) Giaan Rooney (AUS)	0.73	28.58 (GR)	
2	5	(New Zealand) Hannah McLean (NZL)	0.75	29.36	0.78
3	2	(Bermuda) Kiera Aitken (BER)	0.64	30.00	1.42
4	7	(South Africa) Chanelle Van Wyk (RSA)	0.67	30.65	2.07
5	3	(The Bahamas) Alana Dillette (BAH)	0.56	30.92	2.34
6	1	(Isle of Man) Olivia Rawlinson (IOM)	0.71	32.84	4.26
7	8	(Namibia) Jonay Briedenhann (NAM)	0.65	33.52	4.94
DNS	6	(Canada) Geneviève Saumur (CAN)			
