= Cycling at the 2006 Commonwealth Games – Men's road race =

Cycling – Men's road race at the 2006 Commonwealth Games
- Venue: Royal Botanic Gardens
- Location: Melbourne, Australia
- Date: 26 March 2006
- Winning time: 4:05:09

Medalists
gold medal	Mathew Hayman	Australia
silver medal	David George	South Africa
bronze medal	Allan Davis	Australia

The men's cycling road race was one of the road cycling events at the 2006 Commonwealth Games and took place on 26 March 2006 on a route through the Royal Botanic Gardens. The race length was 166 km.

== Results ==
The notation "s.t." indicates that the rider crossed the finish line in the same group as the one receiving the time above him, and was therefore credited with the same finishing time.

Rank	Rider	Time
1st place, gold medalist(s)	Mathew Hayman (AUS)	4:05:09
2nd place, silver medalist(s)	David George (RSA)	4:05:13
3rd place, bronze medalist(s)	Allan Davis (AUS)	4:05:21
4	Steve Cummings (ENG)	4:05:34
5	Gordon Harold Fraser (CAN)	4:05:47
6	Greg Henderson (NZL)	s.t.
7	Mark Cavendish (IOM)	s.t.
8	Roger Aiken (NIR)	s.t.
9	Martin Gilbert (CAN)	s.t.
10	Peter Latham (NZL)	s.t.
11	Tyler Barbour Butterfield (BER)	s.t.
12	David McCann (NIR)	s.t.
13	Stephen Gallagher (NIR)	s.t.
14	William Walker (AUS)	s.t.
15	Dominique Perras (CAN)	4:05:52
16	Ryan Rodney Cox (RSA)	4:05:53
17	Dan Craven (NAM)	s.t.
18	Robert Owen Hunter (RSA)	4:05:55
19	Alfred Rodney Green (RSA)	4:06:02
20	Svein Tuft (CAN)	4:06:09
21	Robin Reid (NZL)	4:06:29
22	Andrew Roche (IOM)	s.t.
23	Glen Mitchell (NZL)	4:08:09
24	Emile Abraham (TRI)	4:10:24
25	Chris Froome (KEN)	s.t.
26	Duncan Urquhart (SCO)	4:14:22
27	David Kinjah (KEN)	4:15:41
28	Ryan Connor (NIR)	4:15:43
29	Arno Viljoen (RSA)	s.t.
30	Alex Coutts (SCO)	s.t.
31	Thomas Evans (NIR)	s.t.
32	Russell Downing (ENG)	4:21:05
33	David Treacy (MLT)	s.t.
34	Jacques Celliers (NAM)	4:22:33
35	Yannick Lincoln (MRI)	s.t.
	Sulayman Kujabi (GAM)	DNS
	Ousman Loum (GAM)	DNS
	Neil Thomas (IVB)	DNS
	Alhassan Bangura (SLE)	DNS
	Mohamed Sesay (SLE)	DNS

=== Did Not Finish ===
Anguilla

- Danny Lloyd Laud
- Charles Bryan
- Kris Pradel
- Ronnie Bryan

Australia

- Ben Day
- Aaron Kemps
- Peter Dawson

Antigua and Barbuda

- Robert Frances Marsh
- Ken Manassah Jackson
- Lynn Byron Murray

Bahamas

- Barron Musgrove
- Jonathan David Massie

Barbados

- Jason Perryman
- Philip Clarke

Belize

- Gregory Lovell
- Ian Smith
- Mateo Cruz
- Roger Troyer

Bermuda

- Geri Bryan Mewett

Cameroon

- Damien Tekou Foukou
- Sadrac Teguimaha
- Flaubert Douanla
- Martinien Tega
- Pascal Bouba

Canada

- Geoff Kabush
- Francois Parisien

Cayman Islands

- Duke Perrigoff Merren

England

- Ian Stannard
- Chris Newton
- Robin Sharman
- Paul Manning

Guernsey

- Tobyn Scott Horton
- Robert James Smart

Guyana

- Jude Nathaniel Bentley
- Warren Christopher McKay

Isle of Man

- Mark Richard Kelly
- Graeme Hatcher
- Andrew William James Cook

Jamaica

- Horace McFarlane
- Oniel Samuels
- Tinga Turner

Jersey

- Sam Firby

Kenya

- Simon Nyoike Ng'ang'a-
- Michael Nziani Muthui
- Davidson Kamau Kihagi
- Peter Kamau

Lesotho

- Poloko Makara
- Tumisang Taabe
- Moeketsi Makatile
- Makhashe Ramolungoa
- Khotso Ntsema
- Tekanyane Moubane

Malaysia

- Sayuti Zahit
- Muhammad Fauzan Ahmad Lufti
- Mohd Jasmin Ruslan

Malta

- Nicholas Formosa
- Etienne Bonello
- Giocondo Schiavone

Mauritius

- Yolain Calypso
- Thomas Desvaux
- Colin Mayer
- Christophe Lincoln

Namibia

- Michael Swanepoel
- Marc Bassingthwaighte
- Mannie Heymans

New Zealand

- Logan Hutchings
- Gordon McCauley

Northern Ireland

- Lewis Ferguson

Pakistan

- Imran Sharif

Scotland

- Evan Oliphant
- Robert Wardell
- Gareth Montgomerie
- James McCallum

Seychelles

- Hedson Mathieu

South Africa

- Jeremy Paul Maartens
- Rupert Rheeder

Saint Vincent and the Grenadines

- Marlon Andre Antrobus

Uganda

- David Kigongo
- David Magezi

Wales

- Matt Brammeier
- Geraint Thomas
- Yanto Barker
- Julian Winn
- Dale Appleby
- Rob Partridge

Zambia

- Hilarry Moono Ng'Ake
- James Malako
