= Swimming at the 2006 Commonwealth Games – Women's 100 metre backstroke =

== Women's 100 m Backstroke - Final ==
Pos.	Lane	Athlete	R.T.	50 m	100 m	Tbh.
	4	(Australia) Sophie Edington (AUS)	0.65	29.81; 29.81	1:00.93 (GR); 31.12	
	5	(Australia) Giaan Rooney (AUS)	0.76	30.14; 30.14	1:01.42; 31.28	0.49
	3	(England) Melanie Marshall (ENG)	0.64	29.87; 29.87	1:01.55; 31.68	0.62
4	6	(New Zealand) Hannah McLean (NZL)	0.72	29.67; 29.67	1:01.71; 32.04	0.78
5	2	(Australia) Tayliah Zimmer (AUS)	0.62	30.05; 30.05	1:01.74; 31.69	0.81
6	1	(England) Katy Sexton (ENG)	0.65	30.46; 30.46	1:02.16; 31.70	1.23
7	7	(Canada) Kelly Stefanyshyn (CAN)	0.65	30.64; 30.64	1:02.71; 32.07	1.78
8	8	(South Africa) Melissa Corfe (RSA)	0.57	30.91; 30.91	1:03.16; 32.25	2.23

== Women's 100 m Backstroke - Semifinals ==
=== Women's 100 m Backstroke - Semifinal 01 ===
Pos.	Lane	Athlete	R.T.	50 m	100 m	Tbh.
1	3	(Australia) Giaan Rooney (AUS)	0.70	30.29; 30.29	1:01.68; 31.39	
2	4	(England) Melanie Marshall (ENG)	0.72	30.26; 30.26	1:01.91; 31.65	0.23
3	5	(New Zealand) Hannah McLean (NZL)	0.73	30.64; 30.64	1:02.46; 31.82	0.78
4	2	(South Africa) Melissa Corfe (RSA)	0.62	30.96; 30.96	1:02.86; 31.90	1.18
5	6	(New Zealand) Melissa Ingram (NZL)	0.74	31.07; 31.07	1:03.10; 32.03	1.42
6	7	(Northern Ireland) Melanie Nocher (NIR)	0.61	31.79; 31.79	1:05.21; 33.42	3.53
7	1	(Canada) Marie-Pier Couillard (CAN)	0.63	32.38; 32.38	1:06.33; 33.95	4.65
8	8	(South Africa) Chanelle Van Wyk (RSA)	0.69	32.08; 32.08	1:07.28; 35.20	5.60

=== Women's 100 m Backstroke - Semifinal 02 ===
Pos.	Lane	Athlete	R.T.	50 m	100 m	Tbh.
1	4	(Australia) Sophie Edington (AUS)	0.65	29.92; 29.92	1:01.30; 31.38	
2	5	(Australia) Tayliah Zimmer (AUS)	0.64	30.66; 30.66	1:02.48; 31.82	1.18
3	3	(Canada) Kelly Stefanyshyn (CAN)	0.65	30.91; 30.91	1:02.69; 31.78	1.39
4	6	(England) Katy Sexton (ENG)	0.71	30.60; 30.60	1:02.80; 32.20	1.50
5	2	(Canada) Landice Yestrau (CAN)	0.68	31.38; 31.38	1:03.90; 32.52	2.60
6	7	(Bermuda) Kiera Aitken (BER)	0.71	31.51; 31.51	1:04.61; 33.10	3.31
7	1	(Singapore) Hiang Yuet Ng (SIN)	0.57	31.79; 31.79	1:06.47; 34.68	5.17
8	8	(Malaysia) Lai Kwan Chui (MAS)	0.63	32.61; 32.61	1:06.48; 33.87	5.18

== Women's 100 m Backstroke - Heats ==
=== Women's 100 m Backstroke - Heat 01 ===
Pos.	Lane	Athlete	R.T.	50 m	100 m	Tbh.
1	5	(Malaysia) Lai Kwan Chui (MAS)	0.64	32.46; 32.46	1:07.25; 34.79	
2	3	(Sri Lanka) Prabha Dharmadasa (SRI)	0.59	35.85; 35.85	1:16.14; 40.29	8.89
3	4	(Maldives) Mariyam Ali (MDV)	0.74	40.82; 40.82	1:26.75; 45.93	19.50

=== Women's 100 m Backstroke - Heat 02 ===
Pos.	Lane	Athlete	R.T.	50 m	100 m	Tbh.
1	5	(England) Melanie Marshall (ENG)	0.73	30.49; 30.49	1:01.92; 31.43	
2	4	(New Zealand) Hannah McLean (NZL)	0.78	31.05; 31.05	1:02.52; 31.47	0.60
3	3	(Bermuda) Kiera Aitken (BER)	0.70	31.79; 31.79	1:04.55; 32.76	2.63
4	6	(Northern Ireland) Melanie Nocher (NIR)	0.62	31.90; 31.90	1:05.59; 33.69	3.67
5	2	(Singapore) Hiang Yuet Ng (SIN)	0.61	31.88; 31.88	1:06.08; 34.20	4.16
6	7	(The Bahamas) Alana Dillette (BAH)	0.66	32.15; 32.15	1:07.69; 35.54	5.77
7	1	(Pakistan) Kiran Khan (PAK)	0.74	35.37; 35.37	1:14.07; 38.70	12.15

=== Women's 100 m Backstroke - Heat 03 ===
Pos.	Lane	Athlete	R.T.	50 m	100 m	Tbh.
1	4	(Australia) Sophie Edington (AUS)	0.67	30.13; 30.13	1:01.32; 31.19	
2	5	(England) Katy Sexton (ENG)	0.67	30.84; 30.84	1:03.01; 32.17	1.69
3	3	(New Zealand) Melissa Ingram (NZL)	0.81	31.15; 31.15	1:03.16; 32.01	1.84
4	6	(South Africa) Melissa Corfe (RSA)	0.61	31.34; 31.34	1:03.94; 32.60	2.62
5	2	(Canada) Marie-Pier Couillard (CAN)	0.71	32.73; 32.73	1:06.79; 34.06	5.47
6	7	(India) Shikha Tandon (IND)	0.74	32.77; 32.77	1:08.52; 35.75	7.20
7	1	(Namibia) Jonay Briedenhann (NAM)	0.60	34.45; 34.45	1:12.52; 38.07	11.20
8	8	(Sri Lanka) Mayumi Raheem (SRI)	0.68	36.54; 36.54	1:16.36; 39.82	15.04

=== Women's 100 m Backstroke - Heat 04 ===
Pos.	Lane	Athlete	R.T.	50 m	100 m	Tbh.
1	4	(Australia) Tayliah Zimmer (AUS)	0.61	30.38; 30.38	1:01.94; 31.56	
2	3	(Canada) Kelly Stefanyshyn (CAN)	0.68	31.03; 31.03	1:02.82; 31.79	0.88
3	5	(Australia) Giaan Rooney (AUS)	0.80	30.47; 30.47	1:02.88; 32.41	0.94
4	6	(Canada) Landice Yestrau (CAN)	0.62	31.19; 31.19	1:03.63; 32.44	1.69
5	2	(South Africa) Chanelle Van Wyk (RSA)	0.69	32.56; 32.56	1:07.30; 34.74	5.36
6	7	(Isle of Man) Olivia Rawlinson (IOM)	0.72	33.57; 33.57	1:08.68; 35.11	6.74
7	1	(Gibraltar) Rachel Fortunato (GIB)	0.68	34.31; 34.31	1:11.85; 37.54	9.91
8	8	(Pakistan) Rubab Raza (PAK)	0.72	36.44; 36.44	1:15.93; 39.49	13.99
