= Swimming at the 2006 Commonwealth Games – Women's 50 metre butterfly =

== Women's 50m Butterfly - Final ==
Pos.	Lane	Athlete	R.T.	50m	Tbh.
	5	(Australia) Danni Miatke (AUS)	0.64	26.43 (GR)	
	4	(Australia) Jessicah Schipper (AUS)	0.65	26.65	0.22
	3	(Australia) Alice Mills (AUS)	0.82	26.78	0.35
	6	(South Africa) Lize-Mari Retief (RSA)	0.82	26.78	0.35
5	7	(Singapore) Tao Li (SIN)	0.71	27.06	0.63
6	1	(South Africa) Mandy Loots (RSA)	0.72	27.62	1.19
7	2	(New Zealand) Nichola Chellingworth (NZL)	0.92	27.67	1.24
8	8	(Canada) Geneviève Saumur (CAN)	0.81	27.81	1.38

== Women's 50m Butterfly - Semifinals ==
=== Women's 50m Butterfly - Semifinal 01 ===
Pos.	Lane	Athlete	R.T.	50m	Tbh.
1	4	(Australia) Jessicah Schipper (AUS)	0.65	26.55 (GR)	
2	5	(South Africa) Lize-Mari Retief (RSA)	0.75	26.86	0.31
3	3	(South Africa) Mandy Loots (RSA)	0.68	27.26	0.71
4	2	(Canada) Geneviève Saumur (CAN)	0.81	27.31	0.76
5	6	(Canada) Audrey Lacroix (CAN)	0.70	27.36	0.81
6	7	(England) Terri Dunning (ENG)	0.76	27.40	0.85
7	1	(Wales) Jemma Lowe (WAL)	0.76	27.92	1.37
8	8	(South Africa) Chanelle Van Wyk (RSA)	0.75	28.30	1.75

=== Women's 50m Butterfly - Semifinal 02 ===
Pos.	Lane	Athlete	R.T.	50m	Tbh.
1	4	(Australia) Danni Miatke (AUS)	0.69	26.58	
2	5	(Australia) Alice Mills (AUS)	0.79	26.76	0.18
3	2	(New Zealand) Nichola Chellingworth (NZL)	0.82	27.22	0.64
4	7	(Singapore) Tao Li (SIN)	0.70	27.25	0.67
5	6	(England) Rosalind Brett (ENG)	0.81	27.37	0.79
6	3	(New Zealand) Elizabeth Coster (NZL)	0.72	27.38	0.80
7	1	(New Zealand) Georgina Toomey (NZL)	0.83	27.71	1.13
8	8	(Scotland) Stephanie Hill (SCO)	0.81	28.11	1.53

== Women's 50m Butterfly - Heats ==
=== Women's 50m Butterfly - Heat 01 ===
Pos.	Lane	Athlete	R.T.	50m	Tbh.
1	4	(Pakistan) Kiran Khan (PAK)	0.97	31.40	
2	3	(Sri Lanka) Chathuri Abeykoon (SRI)	0.85	32.60	1.20
3	5	(Kenya) Nasra Nandha (KEN)	0.84	33.08	1.68
4	6	(Maldives) Aminath Hussain (MDV)	0.87	34.18	2.78

=== Women's 50m Butterfly - Heat 02 ===
Pos.	Lane	Athlete	R.T.	50m	Tbh.
1	4	(Isle of Man) Emily-Claire Crookall-nixon (IOM)	0.72	29.72	
2	5	(Malta) Angela Galea (MLT)	0.82	30.12	0.40
3	3	(Mauritius) Mélissa Vincent (MRI)	0.69	30.13	0.41
4	7	(Namibia) Jonay Briedenhann (NAM)	0.69	30.72	1.00
5	6	(Fiji) Rachel Ah Koy (FIJ)	0.64	31.28	1.56
6	2	(Gibraltar) Elaine Reyes (GIB)	0.79	31.50	1.78
7	1	(Sri Lanka) Mayumi Raheem (SRI)	0.85	31.67	1.95
8	8	(Cayman Islands) Jennifer Powell (CAY)	0.87	31.87	2.15

=== Women's 50m Butterfly - Heat 03 ===
Pos.	Lane	Athlete	R.T.	50m	Tbh.
1	4	(Australia) Alice Mills (AUS)	0.81	27.11	
2	5	(South Africa) Lize-Mari Retief (RSA)	0.72	27.20	0.09
3	6	(South Africa) Mandy Loots (RSA)	0.67	27.39	0.28
4	3	(England) Terri Dunning (ENG)	0.77	27.71	0.60
5	2	(South Africa) Chanelle Van Wyk (RSA)	0.74	28.40	1.29
6	7	(Northern Ireland) Julie Douglas (NIR)	0.74	28.67	1.56
7	8	(Zambia) Ellen Hight (ZAM)	0.72	29.44	2.33
8	1	(Cyprus) Maria Papadopoulos (CYP)	0.78	29.69	2.58

=== Women's 50m Butterfly - Heat 04 ===
Pos.	Lane	Athlete	R.T.	50m	Tbh.
1	4	(Australia) Jessicah Schipper (AUS)	0.67	26.77	
2	5	(England) Rosalind Brett (ENG)	0.84	27.45	0.68
3	6	(New Zealand) Nichola Chellingworth (NZL)	0.80	27.51	0.74
4	2	(Canada) Geneviève Saumur (CAN)	0.82	27.70	0.93
5	1	(Wales) Jemma Lowe (WAL)	0.77	27.97	1.20
6	3	(Canada) Kelly Stefanyshyn (CAN)	0.78	28.06	1.29
7	8	(Jamaica) Tamara Swaby (JAM)	0.75	30.93	4.16
DNS	7	(Singapore) Joscelin Yeo (SIN)			

=== Women's 50m Butterfly - Heat 05 ===
Pos.	Lane	Athlete	R.T.	50m	Tbh.
1	4	(Australia) Danni Miatke (AUS)	0.66	26.67	
2	5	(New Zealand) Elizabeth Coster (NZL)	0.70	27.38	0.71
3	7	(Canada) Audrey Lacroix (CAN)	0.72	27.47	0.80
4	6	(Singapore) Tao Li (SIN)	0.70	27.70	1.03
5	3	(New Zealand) Georgina Toomey (NZL)	0.86	27.74	1.07
6	2	(Scotland) Stephanie Hill (SCO)	0.76	28.28	1.61
7	1	(Wales) Cari-Fflur Davies (WAL)	0.82	28.45	1.78
8	8	(The Bahamas) Alana Dillette (BAH)	0.75	29.46	2.79
