= Swimming at the 2006 Commonwealth Games – Women's 100 metre butterfly =

== Women's 100 m Butterfly - Final ==
Pos.	Lane	Athlete	R.T.	50 m	100 m	Tbh.
	4	Jessicah Schipper (AUS)	0.66	27.09; 27.09	57.48 (GR); 30.39	
	5	Libby Lenton (AUS)	0.82	27.20; 27.20	57.80; 30.60	0.32
	6	Audrey Lacroix (CAN)	0.69	27.62; 27.62	58.89; 31.27	1.41
4	1	Alice Mills (AUS)	0.83	27.47; 27.47	59.21; 31.74	1.73
5	3	Terri Dunning (ENG)	0.77	27.77; 27.77	59.34; 31.57	1.86
6	2	Mandy Loots (RSA)	0.70	28.24; 28.24	59.93; 31.69	2.45
7	8	Jemma Lowe (WAL)	0.76	28.38; 28.38	1:00.52; 32.14	3.04
8	7	Tao Li (SIN)	0.69	28.59; 28.59	1:00.63; 32.04	3.15

== Women's 100 m Butterfly - Semifinals ==
=== Women's 100 m Butterfly - Semifinal 01 ===
Pos.	Lane	Athlete	R.T.	50 m	100 m	Tbh.
1	4	Libby Lenton (AUS)	0.74	27.43; 27.43	58.60; 31.17	
2	5	Audrey Lacroix (CAN)	0.74	27.79; 27.79	59.21; 31.42	0.61
3	3	Mandy Loots (RSA)	0.70	28.09; 28.09	1:00.01; 31.92	1.41
4	2	Elizabeth Coster (NZL)	0.70	28.09; 28.09	1:00.34; 32.25	1.74
5	6	Rosalind Brett (ENG)	0.82	28.01; 28.01	1:00.36; 32.35	1.76
6	7	Georgina Toomey (NZL)	0.82	28.44; 28.44	1:02.75; 34.31	4.15
7	1	Hannah Miley (SCO)	0.83	30.13; 30.13	1:04.04; 33.91	5.44
8	8	Gail Strobridge (GUE)	0.78	30.49; 30.49	1:05.62; 35.13	7.02

=== Women's 100 m Butterfly - Semifinal 02 ===
Pos.	Lane	Athlete	R.T.	50 m	100 m	Tbh.
1	4	Jessicah Schipper (AUS)	0.68	27.34; 27.34	58.21 (GR); 30.87	
2	5	Terri Dunning (ENG)	0.77	27.77; 27.77	59.02; 31.25	0.81
3	7	Tao Li (SIN)	0.70	28.10; 28.10	1:00.15; 32.05	1.94
4	3	Alice Mills (AUS)	0.79	28.16; 28.16	1:00.17; 32.01	1.96
5	6	Jemma Lowe (WAL)	0.73	28.21; 28.21	1:00.23; 32.02	2.02
6	2	Lize-Mari Retief (RSA)	0.75	28.20; 28.20	1:00.61; 32.41	2.40
7	1	Stephanie Hill (SCO)	0.78	29.10; 29.10	1:02.20; 33.10	3.99
8	8	Chanelle Van Wyk (RSA)	0.72	29.47; 29.47	1:04.67; 35.20	6.46

== Women's 100 m Butterfly - Heats ==
=== Women's 100 m Butterfly - Heat 01 ===
Pos.	Lane	Athlete	R.T.	50 m	100 m	Tbh.
1	4	Gail Strobridge (GUE)	0.81	30.73; 30.73	1:05.83; 35.10	
2	3	Emily-Claire Crookall-nixon (IOM)	0.72	30.66; 30.66	1:06.12; 35.46	0.29
3	5	Rachel Ah Koy (FIJ)	0.60	31.35; 31.35	1:09.55; 38.20	3.72
4	2	Aminath Hussain (MDV)	0.94	37.45; 37.45	1:27.92; 50.47	22.09
DNS	6	Nasra Nandha (KEN)				
DNS	7	Linda McEachrane (TRI)				

=== Women's 100 m Butterfly - Heat 02 ===
Pos.	Lane	Athlete	R.T.	50 m	100 m	Tbh.
1	4	Alice Mills (AUS)	0.77	27.91; 27.91	1:00.18; 32.27	
2	3	Elizabeth Coster (NZL)	0.71	28.54; 28.54	1:01.17; 32.63	0.99
3	6	Stephanie Hill (SCO)	0.79	29.18; 29.18	1:03.22; 34.04	3.04
4	1	Alana Dillette (BAH)	0.76	30.80; 30.80	1:06.17; 35.37	5.99
5	8	Jonay Briedenhann (NAM)	0.70	31.22; 31.22	1:08.04; 36.82	7.86
DNS	2	Maria Papadopoulos (CYP)				
DNS	5	Joscelin Yeo (SIN)				
DNS	7	Geneviève Saumur (CAN)				

=== Women's 100 m Butterfly - Heat 03 ===
Pos.	Lane	Athlete	R.T.	50 m	100 m	Tbh.
1	4	Libby Lenton (AUS)	0.76	27.85; 27.85	59.43; 31.58	
2	3	Audrey Lacroix (CAN)	0.76	27.90; 27.90	59.67; 31.77	0.24
3	2	Jemma Lowe (WAL)	0.74	28.40; 28.40	1:00.36; 31.96	0.93
4	5	Rosalind Brett (ENG)	0.77	28.34; 28.34	1:00.59; 32.25	1.16
5	7	Chanelle Van Wyk (RSA)	0.72	29.47; 29.47	1:04.43; 34.96	5.00
6	1	Angela Galea (MLT)	0.82	31.11; 31.11	1:06.17; 35.06	6.74
7	8	Mélissa Vincent (MRI)	0.76	31.63; 31.63	1:08.45; 36.82	9.02
DNS	6	Kelly Stefanyshyn (CAN)				

=== Women's 100 m Butterfly - Heat 04 ===
Pos.	Lane	Athlete	R.T.	50 m	100 m	Tbh.
1	4	Jessicah Schipper (AUS)	0.64	27.39; 27.39	58.49 (GR); 31.10	
2	3	Terri Dunning (ENG)	0.79	28.15; 28.15	59.56; 31.41	1.07
3	5	Mandy Loots (RSA)	0.70	28.55; 28.55	1:00.34; 31.79	1.85
4	2	Lize-Mari Retief (RSA)	0.76	28.58; 28.58	1:00.79; 32.21	2.30
5	6	Tao Li (SIN)	0.72	28.98; 28.98	1:01.35; 32.37	2.86
6	7	Georgina Toomey (NZL)	0.85	28.65; 28.65	1:03.13; 34.48	4.64
7	1	Hannah Miley (SCO)	0.82	29.99; 29.99	1:04.31; 34.32	5.82
8	8	Tamara Swaby (JAM)	0.75	31.78; 31.78	1:08.28; 36.50	9.79
