= Swimming at the 2006 Commonwealth Games – Women's 200 metre freestyle =

== Women's 200 m Freestyle - Final ==
Pos.	Lane	Athlete	R.T.	50 m	100 m	150 m	200 m	Tbh.
	4	Caitlin McClatchey (SCO)	0.72	27.68; 27.68	57.54; 29.86	1:27.71; 30.17	1:57.25 (GR); 29.54	
	3	Libby Lenton (AUS)	0.75	26.76; 26.76	56.78; 30.02	1:27.39; 30.61	1:57.51; 30.12	0.26
	2	Melanie Marshall (ENG)	0.68	27.34; 27.34	57.24; 29.90	1:27.70; 30.46	1:58.11; 30.41	0.86
4	7	Bronte Barratt (AUS)	0.82	27.89; 27.89	58.06; 30.17	1:28.94; 30.88	1:59.33; 30.39	2.08
5	5	Linda Mackenzie (AUS)	0.79	28.30; 28.30	59.10; 30.80	1:29.72; 30.62	1:59.49; 29.77	2.24
6	6	Joanne Jackson (ENG)	0.75	28.38; 28.38	58.80; 30.42	1:29.36; 30.56	1:59.59; 30.23	2.34
7	1	Sophie Simard (CAN)	0.82	28.31; 28.31	59.01; 30.70	1:29.76; 30.75	2:00.33; 30.57	3.08
8	8	Lauren Boyle (NZL)	0.86	28.22; 28.22	58.64; 30.42	1:29.62; 30.98	2:00.90; 31.28	3.65

== Women's 200 m Freestyle - Heats ==
=== Women's 200 m Freestyle - Heat 01 ===
Pos.	Lane	Athlete	R.T.	50 m	100 m	150 m	200 m	Tbh.
1	7	Ming Xiu Ong (MAS)	0.68	30.00; 30.00	1:02.47; 32.47	1:35.31; 32.84	2:07.99; 32.68	
2	5	Anna-Lisa Mopio-jane (PNG)	0.82	29.74; 29.74	1:03.42; 33.68	1:38.72; 35.30	2:14.82; 36.10	6.83
3	4	Jakie Wellman (ZAM)	0.77	29.78; 29.78	1:03.55; 33.77	1:39.53; 35.98	2:16.53; 37.00	8.54
4	3	Nicole Ellsworth (PNG)	0.94	30.80; 30.80	1:05.20; 34.40	1:41.32; 36.12	2:17.33; 36.01	9.34
5	6	Migali Gunatilake (SRI)	0.83	32.42; 32.42	1:09.37; 36.95	1:48.21; 38.84	2:27.26; 39.05	19.27
DNS	2	Linda McEachrane (TRI)						

=== Women's 200 m Freestyle - Heat 02 ===
Pos.	Lane	Athlete	R.T.	50 m	100 m	150 m	200 m	Tbh.
1	5	Caitlin McClatchey (SCO)	0.72	28.50; 28.50	58.90; 30.40	1:29.77; 30.87	1:59.96; 30.19	
2	4	Bronte Barratt (AUS)	0.79	28.14; 28.14	58.79; 30.65	1:29.96; 31.17	2:00.64; 30.68	0.68
3	3	Alison Fitch (NZL)	0.88	28.60; 28.60	59.00; 30.40	1:30.34; 31.34	2:01.69; 31.35	1.73
4	6	Bethan Coole (WAL)	0.76	29.18; 29.18	1:00.11; 30.93	1:31.95; 31.84	2:04.23; 32.28	4.27
5	7	Kirsten Van Heerden (RSA)	0.84	29.76; 29.76	1:01.71; 31.95	1:33.83; 32.12	2:05.83; 32.00	5.87
6	2	Anna Stylianou (CYP)	0.82	29.65; 29.65	1:01.22; 31.57	1:34.20; 32.98	2:07.64; 33.44	7.68
7	8	Alana Dillette (BAH)	0.76	29.91; 29.91	1:02.70; 32.79	1:36.24; 33.54	2:09.60; 33.36	9.64
8	1	Shu Yong Ho (SIN)	0.81	30.75; 30.75	1:04.41; 33.66	1:38.70; 34.29	2:12.50; 33.80	12.54

=== Women's 200 m Freestyle - Heat 03 ===
Pos.	Lane	Athlete	R.T.	50 m	100 m	150 m	200 m	Tbh.
1	4	Linda Mackenzie (AUS)	0.78	28.45; 28.45	59.45; 31.00	1:30.44; 30.99	2:00.11; 29.67	
2	5	Joanne Jackson (ENG)	0.72	28.62; 28.62	59.07; 30.45	1:29.97; 30.90	2:00.23; 30.26	0.12
3	2	Lauren Boyle (NZL)	0.83	28.80; 28.80	59.11; 30.31	1:30.26; 31.15	2:01.11; 30.85	1.00
4	6	Erica Morningstar (CAN)	0.95	29.39; 29.39	59.88; 30.49	1:31.01; 31.13	2:02.25; 31.24	2.14
5	3	Melissa Ingram (NZL)	0.88	28.93; 28.93	59.83; 30.90	1:31.22; 31.39	2:02.60; 31.38	2.49
6	7	Marielle Rogers (RSA)	0.71	29.39; 29.39	1:01.06; 31.67	1:34.09; 33.03	2:07.59; 33.50	7.48
7	8	Olivia Rawlinson (IOM)	0.81	30.38; 30.38	1:03.26; 32.88	1:37.33; 34.07	2:11.58; 34.25	11.47
8	1	Shrone Austin (SEY)	0.85	30.41; 30.41	1:03.36; 32.95	1:38.24; 34.88	2:12.14; 33.90	12.03

=== Women's 200 m Freestyle - Heat 04 ===
Pos.	Lane	Athlete	R.T.	50 m	100 m	150 m	200 m	Tbh.
1	4	Libby Lenton (AUS)	0.75	27.29; 27.29	57.91; 30.62	1:29.28; 31.37	2:00.16; 30.88	
2	5	Melanie Marshall (ENG)	0.71	27.79; 27.79	58.45; 30.66	1:29.40; 30.95	2:00.50; 31.10	0.34
3	3	Sophie Simard (CAN)	0.82	28.38; 28.38	58.96; 30.58	1:29.63; 30.67	2:00.89; 31.26	0.73
4	2	Maya Beaudry (CAN)	0.80	29.05; 29.05	59.37; 30.32	1:30.33; 30.96	2:01.56; 31.23	1.40
5	6	Kate Richardson (ENG)	0.78	28.55; 28.55	59.21; 30.66	1:30.74; 31.53	2:03.17; 32.43	3.01
6	7	Leone Vorster (RSA)	0.72	28.70; 28.70	1:00.14; 31.44	1:31.25; 31.11	2:04.17; 32.92	4.01
7	8	Quah Ting Wen (SIN)	0.73	29.32; 29.32	1:02.39; 33.07	1:35.83; 33.44	2:09.10; 33.27	8.94
8	1	Mylene Ong (SIN)	0.75	30.59; 30.59	1:03.12; 32.53	1:37.74; 34.62	2:11.63; 33.89	11.47
