= Swimming at the 2006 Commonwealth Games – Men's 100 metre backstroke =

== Men's 100 m Backstroke - Final ==
Pos.	Lane	Athlete	R.T.	50 m	100 m	Tbh.
	5	(England) Liam Tancock (ENG)	0.57	26.31; 26.31	54.53 (GR); 28.22	
	4	(Australia) Matthew Welsh (AUS)	0.71	26.72; 26.72	54.82; 28.10	0.29
	6	(Scotland) Gregor Tait (SCO)	0.64	26.58; 26.58	54.89; 28.31	0.36
4	2	(England) Matthew Clay (ENG)	0.59	26.57; 26.57	54.97; 28.40	0.44
5	3	(South Africa) Gerhard Zandberg (RSA)	0.66	26.69; 26.69	55.24; 28.55	0.71
6	7	(Australia) Andrew Lauterstein (AUS)	0.65	26.85; 26.85	55.32; 28.47	0.79
7	8	(South Africa) Johannes Du Rand (RSA)	0.75	27.37; 27.37	56.01; 28.64	1.48
8	1	(Barbados) Nicholas Neckles (BAR)	0.55	27.14; 27.14	56.12; 28.98	1.59

== Men's 100 m Backstroke - Semifinals ==
=== Men's 100 m Backstroke - Semifinal 01 ===
Pos.	Lane	Athlete	R.T.	50 m	100 m	Tbh.
1	4	(Australia) Andrew Lauterstein (AUS)	0.65	27.30; 27.30	55.77; 28.47	
2	3	(Barbados) Nicholas Neckles (BAR)	0.57	27.21; 27.21	56.23; 29.02	0.46
3	5	(South Africa) Johannes Du Rand (RSA)	0.70	27.24; 27.24	56.33; 29.09	0.56
4	6	(Canada) Matthew Rose (CAN)	0.58	27.17; 27.17	56.36; 29.19	0.59
5	2	(New Zealand) Scott Talbot (NZL)	0.63	27.59; 27.59	56.58; 28.99	0.81
6	7	(South Africa) Garth Tune (RSA)	0.60	28.07; 28.07	57.94; 29.87	2.17
7	1	(Canada) Desmond Strelzow (CAN)	0.74	28.75; 28.75	58.92; 30.17	3.15
8	8	(Kenya) David Dunford (KEN)	0.67	28.78; 28.78	59.77; 30.99	4.00

=== Men's 100 m Backstroke - Semifinal 02 ===
Pos.	Lane	Athlete	R.T.	50 m	100 m	Tbh.
1	4	Matthew Welsh (AUS)	0.67	26.69; 26.69	54.82; 28.13	
2	3	Liam Tancock (ENG)	0.55	26.32; 26.32	54.92; 28.60	0.10
3	6	Gerhard Zandberg (RSA)	0.65	26.97; 26.97	55.41; 28.44	0.59
4	2	Gregor Tait (SCO)	0.68	26.76; 26.76	55.45; 28.69	0.63
5	5	Matthew Clay (ENG)	0.62	26.90; 26.90	55.59; 28.69	0.77
6	7	(Malaysia) Keng Liat Lim (MAS)	0.69	26.62; 26.62	56.55; 29.93	1.73
7	8	(Singapore) Lee Yu Tan (SIN)	0.64	29.02; 29.02	59.38; 30.36	4.56
8	1	(Cayman Islands) Andrew Mackay (CAY)	0.59	28.97; 28.97	1:00.34; 31.37	5.52

== Men's 100 m Backstroke - Heats ==
=== Men's 100 m Backstroke - Heat 01 ===
Pos.	Lane	Athlete	R.T.	50 m	100 m	Tbh.
1	5	Jonathon Le Noury (GUE)	0.68	29.87; 29.87	1:01.03; 31.16	
2	4	Mohammad Rana (BAN)	0.71	31.02; 31.02	1:03.53; 32.51	2.50
3	3	Arun Karunaratne (SRI)	0.64	31.04; 31.04	1:04.56; 33.52	3.53

=== Men's 100 m Backstroke - Heat 02 ===
Pos.	Lane	Athlete	R.T.	50 m	100 m	Tbh.
1	4	(Australia) Andrew Lauterstein (AUS)	0.69	27.45; 27.45	55.72; 28.27	
2	3	(Barbados) Nicholas Neckles (BAR)	0.58	27.62; 27.62	56.32; 28.70	0.60
3	5	(New Zealand) Scott Talbot (NZL)	0.64	28.40; 28.40	57.38; 28.98	1.66
4	6	(Canada) Desmond Strelzow (CAN)	0.77	28.98; 28.98	59.01; 30.03	3.29
5	7	(Cayman Islands) Andrew Mackay (CAY)	0.66	29.38; 29.38	59.60; 30.22	3.88
6	2	(The Bahamas) Chris Vythoulkas (BAH)	0.68	28.89; 28.89	59.62; 30.73	3.90
7	1	(Guernsey) Thomas Hollingsworth (GUE)	0.59	29.56; 29.56	1:01.22; 31.66	5.50

=== Men's 100 m Backstroke - Heat 03 ===
Pos.	Lane	Athlete	R.T.	50 m	100 m	Tbh.
1	5	Matthew Clay (ENG)	0.61	27.07; 27.07	55.94; 28.87	
2	4	Liam Tancock (ENG)	0.63	26.55; 26.55	56.11; 29.56	0.17
3	3	Matthew Rose (CAN)	0.59	27.51; 27.51	56.69; 29.18	0.75
4	2	Garth Tune (RSA)	0.58	27.64; 27.64	57.99; 30.35	2.05
5	6	Cameron Gibson (NZL)	0.76	28.48; 28.48	58.65; 30.17	2.71
6	7	Lee Yu Tan (SIN)	0.63	28.95; 28.95	59.15; 30.20	3.21
7	1	David Dunford (KEN)	0.65	28.58; 28.58	59.27; 30.69	3.33

=== Men's 100 m Backstroke - Heat 04 ===
Pos.	Lane	Athlete	R.T.	50 m	100 m	Tbh.
1	4	Matthew Welsh (AUS)	0.70	26.92; 26.92	55.22; 28.30	
2	6	Johannes Du Rand (RSA)	0.74	27.60; 27.60	56.10; 28.50	0.88
3	2	Gerhard Zandberg (RSA)	0.70	27.99; 27.99	56.48; 28.49	1.26
4	3	Gregor Tait (SCO)	0.65	27.21; 27.21	56.83; 29.62	1.61
5	5	Keng Liat Lim (MAS)	0.68	27.47; 27.47	57.61; 30.14	2.39
6	7	Ian Powell (GUE)	0.64	28.72; 28.72	59.52; 30.80	4.30
7	1	Dane Harrop (IOM)	0.73	29.63; 29.63	1:00.71; 31.08	5.49
8	8	Gael Adam (MRI)	0.67	29.41; 29.41	1:01.11; 31.70	5.89
