= Swimming at the 2006 Commonwealth Games – Women's 200 metre backstroke =

== Women's 200 m Backstroke - Final ==
Pos.	Lane	Athlete	R.T.	50 m	100 m	150 m	200 m	Tbh.
	4	(Australia) Joanna Fargus (AUS)	0.64	31.57; 31.57	1:04.70; 33.13	1:37.83; 33.13	2:10.36 (GR); 32.53	
	3	(England) Melanie Marshall (ENG)	0.63	31.01; 31.01	1:04.33; 33.32	1:38.01; 33.68	2:10.87; 32.86	0.51
	2	(New Zealand) Hannah McLean (NZL)	0.73	31.40; 31.40	1:04.85; 33.45	1:38.34; 33.49	2:12.47; 34.13	2.11
4	8	(Australia) Sophie Edington (AUS)	0.72	30.75; 30.75	1:04.20; 33.45	1:38.68; 34.48	2:12.58; 33.90	2.22
5	7	(Australia) Tayliah Zimmer (AUS)	0.70	30.98; 30.98	1:04.19; 33.21	1:38.63; 34.44	2:12.95; 34.32	2.59
6	5	(New Zealand) Melissa Ingram (NZL)	0.77	31.50; 31.50	1:04.57; 33.07	1:38.49; 33.92	2:13.09; 34.60	2.73
7	6	(South Africa) Melissa Corfe (RSA)	0.59	31.57; 31.57	1:04.92; 33.35	1:39.31; 34.39	2:13.67; 34.36	3.31
8	1	(England) Katy Sexton (ENG)	0.67	31.37; 31.37	1:05.30; 33.93	1:40.61; 35.31	2:15.91; 35.30	5.55

== Women's 200 m Backstroke - Heats ==
=== Women's 200 m Backstroke - Heat 01 ===
Pos.	Lane	Athlete	R.T.	50 m	100 m	150 m	200 m	Tbh.
1	5	(Australia) Tayliah Zimmer (AUS)	0.67	31.06; 31.06	1:04.34; 33.28	1:39.04; 34.70	2:14.38; 35.34	
2	4	(England) Katy Sexton (ENG)	0.69	31.65; 31.65	1:05.74; 34.09	1:40.35; 34.61	2:14.69; 34.34	0.31
3	3	(Scotland) Lorna Smith (SCO)	0.79	32.66; 32.66	1:06.92; 34.26	1:41.74; 34.82	2:16.42; 34.68	2.04
4	6	(Northern Ireland) Melanie Nocher (NIR)	0.61	32.12; 32.12	1:06.74; 34.62	1:42.23; 35.49	2:18.00; 35.77	3.62
DNS	2	(Bermuda) Kiera Aitken (BER)						
DNS	7	(Sri Lanka) Mayumi Raheem (SRI)						

=== Women's 200 m Backstroke - Heat 02 ===
Pos.	Lane	Athlete	R.T.	50 m	100 m	150 m	200 m	Tbh.
1	4	(England) Melanie Marshall (ENG)	0.70	31.47; 31.47	1:05.53; 34.06	1:39.52; 33.99	2:12.43; 32.91	
2	3	(South Africa) Melissa Corfe (RSA)	0.61	31.60; 31.60	1:05.07; 33.47	1:39.15; 34.08	2:13.17; 34.02	0.74
3	5	(Australia) Sophie Edington (AUS)	0.71	31.84; 31.84	1:05.95; 34.11	1:40.96; 35.01	2:15.56; 34.60	3.13
4	6	(Canada) Landice Yestrau (CAN)	0.71	32.80; 32.80	1:08.11; 35.31	1:44.10; 35.99	2:20.20; 36.10	7.77
5	2	(Isle of Man) Olivia Rawlinson (IOM)	0.77	34.57; 34.57	1:11.36; 36.79	1:49.39; 38.03	2:27.11; 37.72	14.68
6	7	(Sri Lanka) Prabha Dharmadasa (SRI)	0.56	37.01; 37.01	1:19.94; 42.93	2:04.94; 45.00	2:48.05; 43.11	35.62

=== Women's 200 m Backstroke - Heat 03 ===
Pos.	Lane	Athlete	R.T.	50 m	100 m	150 m	200 m	Tbh.
1	4	(Australia) Joanna Fargus (AUS)	0.63	31.24; 31.24	1:04.13; 32.89	1:37.42; 33.29	2:10.84; 33.42	
2	6	(New Zealand) Melissa Ingram (NZL)	0.71	31.68; 31.68	1:04.76; 33.08	1:38.46; 33.70	2:12.34; 33.88	1.50
3	5	(New Zealand) Hannah McLean (NZL)	0.79	31.48; 31.48	1:04.10; 32.62	1:39.28; 35.18	2:14.37; 35.09	3.53
4	3	(Canada) Kelly Stefanyshyn (CAN)	0.70	32.20; 32.20	1:06.50; 34.30	1:41.16; 34.66	2:15.77; 34.61	4.93
5	2	(Isle of Man) Emily-Claire Crookall-nixon (IOM)	0.66	34.75; 34.75	1:11.52; 36.77	1:48.99; 37.47	2:26.14; 37.15	15.30
6	7	(Namibia) Jonay Briedenhann (NAM)	0.68	36.34; 36.34	1:15.72; 39.38	1:56.47; 40.75	2:36.87; 40.40	26.03
