= Swimming at the 2006 Commonwealth Games – Men's 100 metre butterfly =

== Men's 100 m Butterfly - Final ==
Pos.	Lane	Athlete	R.T.	50 m	100 m	Tbh.
	5	Ryan Pini (PNG)	0.83	24.38; 24.38	52.64; 28.26	
	4	Michael Klim (AUS)	0.75	24.92; 24.92	52.70; 27.78	0.06
	6	Moss Burmester (NZL)	0.76	24.91; 24.91	52.73; 27.82	0.09
4	1	Corney Swanepoel (NZL)	0.74	24.77; 24.77	53.14; 28.37	0.50
5	3	Adam Pine (AUS)	0.83	24.95; 24.95	53.25; 28.30	0.61
6	2	Todd Cooper (SCO)	0.68	24.54; 24.54	53.31; 28.77	0.67
7	7	Matthew Bowe (ENG)	0.92	24.98; 24.98	53.64; 28.66	1.00
8	8	Thomas Kindler (CAN)	0.76	24.89; 24.89	54.18; 29.29	1.54

== Men's 100 m Butterfly - Semifinals ==
=== Men's 100 m Butterfly - Semifinal 01 ===
Pos.	Lane	Athlete	R.T.	50 m	100 m	Tbh.
1	4	Todd Cooper (SCO)	0.67	24.86; 24.86	53.30; 28.44	
2	5	Matthew Bowe (ENG)	0.88	25.20; 25.20	53.53; 28.33	0.23
3	3	Corney Swanepoel (NZL)	0.75	24.93; 24.93	53.77; 28.84	0.47
4	2	Darryl Rudolf (CAN)	0.78	25.32; 25.32	54.05; 28.73	0.75
5	6	Jeremy Knowles (BAH)	0.74	25.64; 25.64	54.46; 28.82	1.16
6	7	Ian Powell (GUE)	0.71	26.06; 26.06	55.74; 29.68	2.44
7	1	Andrew McMillan (NZL)	0.76	26.35; 26.35	55.81; 29.46	2.51
8	8	Arjun Muralidharan (IND)	0.83	26.32; 26.32	56.65; 30.33	3.35

=== Men's 100 m Butterfly - Semifinal 01 ===
Pos.	Lane	Athlete	R.T.	50 m	100 m	Tbh.
1	6	Michael Klim (AUS)	0.75	24.75; 24.75	52.86; 28.11	
2	4	Ryan Pini (PNG)	0.77	24.62; 24.62	52.91; 28.29	0.05
3	5	Adam Pine (AUS)	0.76	24.96; 24.96	52.96; 28.00	0.10
4	3	Moss Burmester (NZL)	0.86	25.21; 25.21	53.15; 27.94	0.29
5	7	Thomas Kindler (CAN)	0.80	24.80; 24.80	53.83; 29.03	0.97
6	2	Andrew Richards (AUS)	0.67	25.51; 25.51	54.37; 28.86	1.51
7	1	Daniel Bego (MAS)	0.68	26.03; 26.03	55.49; 29.46	2.63
8	8	Simon Le Couilliard (JER)	0.79	26.07; 26.07	56.52; 30.45	3.66

== Men's 100 m Butterfly - Heats ==
=== Men's 100 m Butterfly - Heat 01 ===
Pos.	Lane	Athlete	R.T.	50 m	100 m	Tbh.
1	7	Daniel Bego (MAS)	0.68	25.98; 25.98	55.81; 29.83	
2	5	Conrad Francis (SRI)	0.82	26.15; 26.15	56.78; 30.63	0.97
3	2	Md Jewel Ahmed (BAN)	0.88	27.24; 27.24	59.95; 32.71	4.14
4	8	Kyle Tingler (SHE)	0.74	26.99; 26.99	1:00.29; 33.30	4.48
5	3	Bertrand Bristol (SEY)	0.67	27.94; 27.94	1:00.78; 32.84	4.97
6	1	Earlando Mc Rae (GUY)	0.63	28.23; 28.23	1:01.30; 33.07	5.49
7	4	Naji Ferguson (GRN)	0.87	27.85; 27.85	1:01.83; 33.98	6.02
8	6	Mohamed Sharif (MDV)	0.90	34.93; 34.93	1:22.14; 47.21	26.33

=== Men's 100 m Butterfly - Heat 02 ===
Pos.	Lane	Athlete	R.T.	50 m	100 m	Tbh.
1	5	Ryan Pini (PNG)	0.79	25.03; 25.03	53.50; 28.47	
2	4	Adam Pine (AUS)	0.80	25.47; 25.47	53.72; 28.25	0.22
3	3	Jeremy Knowles (BAH)	0.76	25.56; 25.56	54.42; 28.86	0.92
4	6	Andrew McMillan (NZL)	0.74	26.39; 26.39	56.01; 29.62	2.51
5	2	Cheng Xun Ng (SIN)	0.66	26.61; 26.61	57.03; 30.42	3.53
6	7	Thomas Hollingsworth (GUE)	0.87	27.09; 27.09	57.45; 30.36	3.95
7	1	Brad Hamilton (JAM)	0.68	27.08; 27.08	58.21; 31.13	4.71
8	8	Luke Hall (SWZ)	0.74	27.82; 27.82	1:00.15; 32.33	6.65

=== Men's 100 m Butterfly - Heat 03 ===
Pos.	Lane	Athlete	R.T.	50 m	100 m	Tbh.
1	4	Todd Cooper (SCO)	0.69	24.85; 24.85	53.64; 28.79	
2	3	Matthew Bowe (ENG)	0.90	24.93; 24.93	53.83; 28.90	0.19
3	5	Michael Klim (AUS)	0.72	25.00; 25.00	53.98; 28.98	0.34
4	6	Thomas Kindler (CAN)	0.79	25.12; 25.12	54.72; 29.60	1.08
5	2	Simon Le Couilliard (JER)	0.82	26.26; 26.26	56.13; 29.87	2.49
6	7	Michael O'connor (BER)	0.79	27.01; 27.01	58.05; 31.04	4.41
7	1	Ramadhan Vyombo (KEN)	0.79	26.52; 26.52	1:00.13; 33.61	6.49
8	8	Ben Lowndes (GUE)	0.85	27.73; 27.73	1:00.21; 32.48	6.57

=== Men's 100 m Butterfly - Heat 04 ===
Pos.	Lane	Athlete	R.T.	50 m	100 m	Tbh.
1	5	Moss Burmester (NZL)	0.79	25.24; 25.24	53.88; 28.64	
2	4	Corney Swanepoel (NZL)	0.73	25.09; 25.09	53.94; 28.85	0.06
3	3	Andrew Richards (AUS)	0.62	25.50; 25.50	54.56; 29.06	0.68
4	6	Darryl Rudolf (CAN)	0.76	25.86; 25.86	54.60; 28.74	0.72
5	2	Ian Powell (GUE)	0.68	25.99; 25.99	55.75; 29.76	1.87
6	7	Arjun Muralidharan (IND)	0.85	26.36; 26.36	56.74; 30.38	2.86
7	1	Shirong Su (SIN)	0.73	26.64; 26.64	56.80; 30.16	2.92
8	8	Alexander Ray (NAM)	0.70	27.56; 27.56	1:00.09; 32.53	6.21
