= Swimming at the 2006 Commonwealth Games – Women's 50 metre breaststroke =

== Women's 50 m Breaststroke - Finals ==
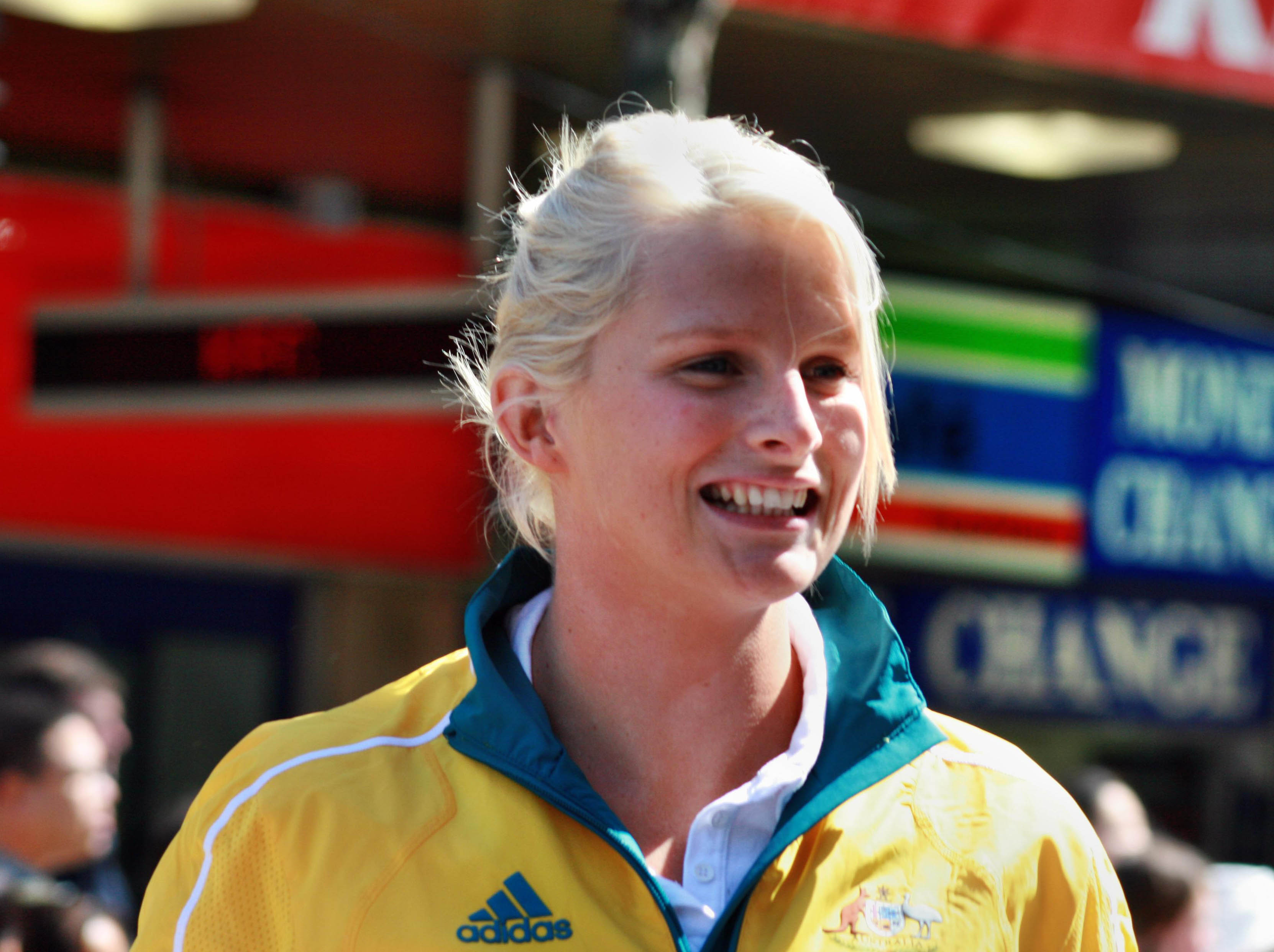
Leisel Jones

Pos.	Lane	Athlete	R.T.	50 m	Tbh.
	5	Leisel Jones (AUS)	0.80	30.55	
	4	Jade Edmistone (AUS)	0.85	30.84	0.29
	3	Tarnee White (AUS)	0.78	31.26	0.71
4	2	Zoë Baker (NZL)	0.80	31.45	0.90
5	6	Kate Haywood (ENG)	0.87	31.84	1.29
6	8	Suzaan van Biljon (RSA)	0.75	31.90	1.35
7	1	Lauren van Oosten (CAN)	0.76	32.13	1.58
8	7	Lowri Tynan (WAL)	0.79	32.79	2.24

== Women's 50 m Breaststroke - Semifinals ==
=== Women's 50 m Breaststroke - Semifinal 01 ===
Pos.	Lane	Athlete	R.T.	50 m	Tbh.
1	4	Leisel Jones (AUS)	0.79	30.59	
2	5	Zoë Baker (NZL)	0.73	31.84	1.25
3	6	Lowri Tynan (WAL)	0.79	32.38	1.79
4	3	Suzaan van Biljon (RSA)	0.74	32.52	1.93
5	2	Annabelle Carey (NZL)	0.74	32.71	2.12
6	7	Tamaryn Laubscher (RSA)	0.77	33.50	2.91
7	1	Rachel Ah Koy (FIJ)	0.63	35.25	4.66
DSQ	8	Kerry Buchan (SCO)			

=== Women's 50 m Breaststroke - Semifinal 02 ===
Pos.	Lane	Athlete	R.T.	50 m	Tbh.
1	4	Jade Edmistone (AUS)	0.84	30.54	
2	5	Tarnee White (AUS)	0.75	31.35	0.81
3	3	Kate Haywood (ENG)	0.89	31.63	1.09
4	6	Lauren van Oosten (CAN)	0.77	32.46	1.92
5	7	Alia Atkinson (JAM)	0.75	32.59	2.05
6	2	Fiona Booth (SCO)	0.89	32.93	2.39
7	1	Marie-Pier Couillard (CAN)	0.70	34.57	4.03
8	8	Mayumi Raheem (SRI)	0.84	35.63	5.09

== Women's 50 m Breaststroke - Heats ==
=== Women's 50 m Breaststroke - Heat 01 ===
Pos.	Lane	Athlete	R.T.	50 m	Tbh.
1	3	Natasha Ratter (UGA)	0.91	42.71	
2	5	Christal Clashing O'Reilly (ANT)	0.93	43.05	0.34
3	4	Mariyam Ali (MDV)	0.92	43.40	0.69

=== Women's 50 m Breaststroke - Heat 02 ===
Pos.	Lane	Athlete	R.T.	50 m	Tbh.
1	4	Tarnee White (AUS)	0.76	31.55	
2	5	Suzaan van Biljon (RSA)	0.73	32.21	0.66
3	3	Lowri Tynan (WAL)	0.76	32.77	1.22
4	2	Rachel Ah Koy (FIJ)	0.64	35.16	3.61
5	6	Kerry Buchan (SCO)	0.74	35.43	3.88
6	7	Stacey Ryder (SWZ)	0.72	36.96	5.41
7	1	Nicole Ellsworth (PNG)	0.88	39.81	8.26

=== Women's 50 m Breaststroke - Heat 03 ===
Pos.	Lane	Athlete	R.T.	50 m	Tbh.
1	4	Leisel Jones (AUS)	0.79	30.78	
2	5	Kate Haywood (ENG)	0.88	31.82	1.04
3	3	Fiona Booth (SCO)	0.84	32.82	2.04
4	6	Tamaryn Laubscher (RSA)	0.76	33.54	2.76
5	2	Marie-Pier Couillard (CAN)	0.69	34.92	4.14
6	1	Ellen Hight (ZAM)	0.75	36.22	5.44
7	7	Dannie'Lle Van Zijl (NAM)	0.84	36.26	5.48

=== Women's 50 m Breaststroke - Heat 04 ===
Pos.	Lane	Athlete	R.T.	50 m	Tbh.
1	4	(Australia) Jade Edmistone (AUS)	0.84	30.51 (GR)	
2	5	(New Zealand) Zoë Baker (NZL)	0.80	31.70	1.19
3	6	(Canada) Lauren van Oosten (CAN)	0.79	32.39	1.88
4	3	(New Zealand) Annabelle Carey (NZL)	0.73	32.85	2.34
5	2	(Jamaica) Alia Atkinson (JAM)	0.72	33.09	2.58
6	1	(Sri Lanka) Mayumi Raheem (SRI)	0.82	35.40	4.89
7	7	(Barbados) Alexis Jordan (BAR)	0.84	36.04	5.53
8	8	(Kenya) Nasra Nandha (KEN)	0.84	41.79	11.28
