= Swimming at the 2006 Commonwealth Games – Men's 50 metre butterfly =

== Men's 50 m Butterfly - Final ==
Pos.	Lane	Athlete	R.T.	50 m	Tbh.
	4	(South Africa) Roland Schoeman (RSA)	0.73	23.34	
	6	(Australia) Matthew Welsh (AUS)	0.71	23.63	0.29
	5	(Australia) Michael Klim (AUS)	0.71	23.74	0.40
4	2	(Canada) Thomas Kindler (CAN)	0.75	24.00	0.66
5	8	(Papua New Guinea) Ryan Pini (PNG)	0.74	24.01	0.67
6	7	(Scotland) Todd Cooper (SCO)	0.66	24.05	0.71
7	1	(England) Matthew Clay (ENG)	0.77	24.21	0.87
DSQ	3	(Australia) Matt Targett (AUS)			

== Men's 50 m Butterfly - Semifinals ==
=== Men's 50 m Butterfly - Semifinal 01 ===
Rank	Lane	Athlete	Reaction Time	50 m	time behind
1	4	(Australia) Matt Targett (AUS)	0.73	23.86	
2	5	(Australia) Matthew Welsh (AUS)	0.73	23.97	0.11
3	2	(England) Matthew Clay (ENG)	0.75	24.08	0.22
3	6	(Scotland) Todd Cooper (SCO)	0.75	24.08	0.22
5	3	(Papua New Guinea) Ryan Pini (PNG)	0.79	24.13	0.27
6	7	(Scotland) David Leith (SCO)	0.78	24.77	0.91
7	1	(The Bahamas) Jeremy Knowles (BAH)	0.71	24.83	0.97
8	8	(The Bahamas) Chris Vythoulkas (BAH)	0.75	25.53	1.67

=== Men's 50 m Butterfly - Semifinal 01 ===
Pos.	Lane	Athlete	R.T.	50 m	Tbh.
1	4	(South Africa) Roland Schoeman (RSA)	0.65	23.14 (GR)	
2	5	(Australia) Michael Klim (AUS)	0.74	23.80	0.66
3	6	(Canada) Thomas Kindler (CAN)	0.78	24.05	0.91
4	3	(New Zealand) Corney Swanepoel (NZL)	0.72	24.30	1.16
5	1	(England) Mark Foster (ENG)	0.92	24.36	1.22
6	2	(Canada) Darryl Rudolf (CAN)	0.78	24.54	1.40
7	7	(New Zealand) Moss Burmester (NZL)	0.78	24.73	1.59
8	8	(Guernsey) Ian Powell (GUE)	0.73	25.68	2.54

== Men's 50 m Butterfly - Heats ==
=== Men's 50 m Butterfly - Heat 01 ===
Pos.	Lane	Athlete	R.T.	50 m	Tbh.
1	6	(Saint Helena, Ascension and Tristan da Cunha) Kyle Tingler (SHE)	0.71	26.30	
2	3	(Guyana) Earlando Mc Rae (GUY)	0.65	27.43	1.13
3	4	(Uganda) Gilbert Kaburu (UGA)	0.92	30.72	4.42
4	5	(Uganda) Max Kanyerezi (UGA)	0.94	34.80	8.50

=== Men's 50 m Butterfly - Heat 02 ===
Pos.	Lane	Athlete	R.T.	50 m	Tbh.
1	8	(Malaysia) Daniel Bego (MAS)	0.69	27.01	
2	4	(Grenada) Naji Ferguson (GRN)	0.87	27.33	0.32
3	3	(Gibraltar) Jamie Zammitt (GIB)	0.84	27.38	0.37
4	6	(Seychelles) Bertrand Bristol (SEY)	0.66	27.75	0.74
5	2	(Guernsey) Ian Hubert (GUE)	0.76	27.80	0.79
6	7	(Sri Lanka) Stefan Lee (SRI)	0.83	28.12	1.11
7	5	(Sri Lanka) Anthony Wickramasinghe (SRI)	0.77	28.20	1.19
8	1	(Maldives) Mohamed Sharif (MDV)	0.89	32.93	5.92

=== Men's 50 m Butterfly - Heat 03 ===
Pos.	Lane	Athlete	R.T.	50 m	Tbh.
1	5	(Guernsey) Ian Powell (GUE)	0.67	25.51	
2	6	(Singapore) Shirong Su (SIN)	0.70	26.12	0.61
3	4	(Kenya) Ramadhan Vyombo (KEN)	0.76	26.36	0.85
4	7	(Jamaica) Brad Hamilton (JAM)	0.69	26.60	1.09
5	3	(Kenya) David Dunford (KEN)	0.89	26.90	1.39
6	2	(Guernsey) Thomas Hollingsworth (GUE)	0.85	27.07	1.56
7	8	(Eswatini) Luke Hall (SWZ)	0.70	27.10	1.59
8	1	(Namibia) Alexander Ray (NAM)	0.69	27.24	1.73

=== Men's 50 m Butterfly - Heat 04 ===
Pos.	Lane	Athlete	R.T.	50 m	Tbh.
1	5	(Australia) Matt Targett (AUS)	0.78	23.91	
2	4	(New Zealand) Corney Swanepoel (NZL)	0.72	24.23	0.32
3	3	(Canada) Thomas Kindler (CAN)	0.79	24.45	0.54
4	2	(New Zealand) Moss Burmester (NZL)	0.79	24.64	0.73
5	7	(The Bahamas) Chris Vythoulkas (BAH)	0.74	25.61	1.70
6	6	(Wales) Owen Morgan (WAL)	0.79	25.70	1.79
7	1	(Bermuda) Michael O'connor (BER)	0.78	25.94	2.03
8	8	(Sri Lanka) Conrad Francis (SRI)	0.84	26.43	2.52

=== Men's 50 m Butterfly - Heat 05 ===
Pos.	Lane	Athlete	R.T.	50 m	Tbh.
1	5	(Australia) Matthew Welsh (AUS)	0.75	24.18	
2	3	(Scotland) Todd Cooper (SCO)	0.68	24.48	0.30
3	6	(England) Matthew Clay (ENG)	0.79	24.55	0.37
4	2	(Scotland) David Leith (SCO)	0.84	24.79	0.61
5	1	(South Africa) Garth Tune (RSA)	0.72	25.72	1.54
6	8	(Jersey) Simon Le Couilliard (JER)	0.80	25.82	1.64
7	7	(Singapore) Cheng Xun Ng (SIN)	0.64	26.06	1.88
DNS	4	(South Africa) Ryk Neethling (RSA)			

=== Men's 50 m Butterfly - Heat 06 ===
Pos.	Lane	Athlete	R.T.	50 m	Tbh.
1	4	(South Africa) Roland Schoeman (RSA)	0.66	23.59	
2	5	(Australia) Michael Klim (AUS)	0.74	24.04	0.45
3	6	(Papua New Guinea) Ryan Pini (PNG)	0.80	24.27	0.68
4	2	(Canada) Darryl Rudolf (CAN)	0.77	24.54	0.95
5	3	(England) Mark Foster (ENG)	0.95	24.91	1.32
6	7	(The Bahamas) Jeremy Knowles (BAH)	0.73	25.11	1.52
7	8	(Bermuda) Ronald Cowen (BER)	0.83	25.92	2.33
8	1	(Bangladesh) Md Jewel Ahmed (BAN)	0.86	26.68	3.09
