= Lisa Daniels (synchronised swimmer) =

New Zealand synchronised swimmer

Personal information
- Born: 24 March 1985 (age 41) Dunedin, New Zealand
Medal record
Women's Synchronised swimming
Representing New Zealand
Commonwealth Games
Bronze medal – third place	2006 Melbourne	Duet

Lisa Daniels (born 24 March 1985 in Dunedin, New Zealand) is a New Zealand synchronised swimming competitor. She won a bronze team medal with her sister Nina Daniels in the Duet at the 2006 Commonwealth Games.

She also competed at the 2008 Summer Olympics.
