= Troy McLean =

New Zealand basketball player

Personal information
- Born: 30 July 1979 (age 47) Wellington, New Zealand
- Listed height: 193 cm (6 ft 4 in)

Career information
- High school: Rongotai College (Wellington, New Zealand)
- Playing career: 1996–2014; 2021
- Position: Shooting guard
- Coaching career: 2019–present

Career history

Playing
- 1996; 1998–2005: Wellington Saints
- 2006: Harbour Heat
- 2007–2012: Wellington Saints
- 2013–2014: Manawatu Jets
- 2021: Wellington Saints

Coaching
- 2019; 2021–2022: Wellington Saints (assistant)
- 2022–2023: Wellington Saints
- 2024: Wellington Saints (assistant)

Career highlights
- As player: 4× NBL champion (2003, 2010, 2011, 2021); As coach: 2× NBL champion (2019, 2021)
Medals
Men's basketball
Representing New Zealand
Commonwealth Games
Silver medal – second place	2006 Melbourne	Team competition

Troy Johnathon McLean (born 30 July 1979) is a New Zealand basketball coach and former player.

== Early life ==
McLean was born in Wellington, New Zealand, and was raised in the suburb of Newtown. He grew up in a softball-made household, but took up basketball at Rongotai College.

== NBL career ==
McLean debuted in the NBL in 1996 with the Wellington Saints. He played one game as a 17-year-old. He became a regular player for the Saints in 1998 and went on to win a championship in 2003.

In 2006, McLean played for the Harbour Heat. He returned to the Saints in 2007 and won two more championships in 2010 and 2011. In July 2011, he played his 258th straight game, a run that was believed to be unequalled in the NBL at the time.

In 2013, McLean joined the Manawatu Jets. He played a second season with the Jets in 2014 and played his 300th NBL game.

In 2019, McLean served as an assistant coach on the championship-winning Wellington Saints team. He came out of retirement in 2021 to serve as a player-assistant for the Saints. In June 2021, his 320 NBL games ranked fourth most in league history.

McLean continued as assistant coach of the Saints in 2022. On 21 June 2022, he was elevated to interim head coach for the rest of the season after Guy Molloy was sacked. He re-signed as head coach on 3 November 2022 for the 2023 season. In November 2023, he accepted the lead assistant coaching role with the Saints for the 2024 season.

== National team career ==
McLean made his debut for the Tall Blacks in 2004. In 2006, he was a member of the team that won a silver medal at the Commonwealth Games.

== Personal life ==
McLean's older brother Stacy represented the Black Sox in international softball.

McLean has two children.
