= Jessica McCormack =

New Zealand basketball and netball player

Personal information
- Born: 8 September 1989 (age 36) Hamilton, New Zealand
Medal record
Women's basketball
Representing New Zealand
Commonwealth Games
Silver medal – second place	2006 Melbourne	Basketball

Jessica McCormack (born 8 September 1989 in Hamilton, New Zealand) is a women's basketball and netball player. At the 2006 Commonwealth Games she won a silver medal as part of the Tall Ferns New Zealand women's basketball team. McCormack represented New Zealand in basketball again at the 2008 Summer Olympics in Beijing.

McCormack played college basketball in the United States for the University of Washington and the University of Connecticut. In 2009, she returned to New Zealand in 2009 for surgery on an Achilles tendon injury. That year, McCormack was also signed for the Netball New Zealand Accelerant Group, a development squad for potential players in the New Zealand netball team, the Silver Ferns. She later signed with the Canberra Capitals in the Australian WNBL.
