= Kathryn Mead =

New Zealand sport shooter

Medal record

Representing New Zealand

Women's Shooting

Commonwealth Games
Bronze medal – third place	2006 Melbourne	50m Rifle – Prone (Pairs)

Kathryn Mead (born 14 February 1977 in Nelson, New Zealand) is a shooting competitor for New Zealand.

At the 2006 Commonwealth Games she won a bronze medal in the 50m Rifle Prone Pairs event with Juliet Etherington.
