= Nina Daniels =

New Zealand synchronised swimmer

Personal information
- Born: 22 June 1982 (age 44)
Medal record
Women's Synchronised swimming
Representing New Zealand
Commonwealth Games
Bronze medal – third place	2006 Melbourne	Duet

Nina Daniels (born 22 June 1982, in Dunedin, New Zealand) is a New Zealand synchronised swimming competitor. She won a bronze medal with her sister Lisa Daniels in the Duet at the 2006 Commonwealth Games.

She competed at the 2008 Summer Olympics.
