= Jody Tini =

New Zealand basketball player

Personal information
- Born: 10 February 1976 (age 50)
Medal record
Women's basketball
Representing New Zealand
Commonwealth Games
Silver medal – second place	2006 Melbourne	Team competition

Jody Hinemoa Cameron (born 10 February 1976 in Whangarei, New Zealand) is a basketball player for New Zealand. At the 2006 Commonwealth Games she won a silver medal as part of the Tall Ferns New Zealand women's basketball team.

She comes from a basketball family as she is the sister of Tall Black captain Pero Cameron, and the daughter of Mata Cameron, a national age group coach.
