= Bahamas at the 2006 Commonwealth Games =

- Flag of the Bahamas
- CGF code: BAH
- CGA: Bahamas Olympic Committee
- Website: bahamasolympiccommittee.org

in Melbourne, Australia
- Competitors: 25 (19 men, 6 women) in 4 sports
- Flag bearers: Opening: Closing:
- Medals Ranked 24th: Gold 0 Silver 2 Bronze 0 Total 2

Commonwealth Games appearances (overview)
- 1954; 1958; 1962; 1966; 1970; 1974; 1978; 1982; 1986; 1990; 1994; 1998; 2002; 2006; 2010; 2014; 2018; 2022; 2026; 2030

The Bahamas is represented at the 2006 Commonwealth Games in Melbourne by a xx-member strong contingent comprising 25 sportspersons and xx officials.

== Competitors ==
The following is the list of number of competitors participating in the Games.

Sport	Men	Women	Total
Athletics	12	5	17
Boxing	3	0	3
Cycling	2	0	2
Swimming	2	1	3
Total	19	6	25

== Medallists ==
The following Bahamian competitors won medals at the Games. In the 'by discipline' sections below, medallists' names are in bold.

Medal	Name	Sport	Event	Date
Silver	Laverne Eve	Athletics	Women's javelin throw	19 March
Silver	Tonique Williams	Athletics	Women's 400 m	21 March

**Medals by sport**
**Sport**	1st place, gold medalist(s)	2nd place, silver medalist(s)	3rd place, bronze medalist(s)	**Total**
Athletics	0	2	0	**2**
**Total**	**0**	**2**	**0**	**2**

**Medals by date**
**Day**	**Date**	1st place, gold medalist(s)	2nd place, silver medalist(s)	3rd place, bronze medalist(s)	Total
1	16 March	0	0	0	0
2	17 March	0	0	0	0
3	18 March	0	0	0	0
4	19 March	0	1	0	1
5	20 March	0	0	0	0
6	21 March	0	1	0	1
7	22 March	0	0	0	0
8	23 March	0	0	0	0
9	24 March	0	0	0	0
10	25 March	0	0	0	0
11	26 March	0	0	0	0
**Total**		**2**	**0**	**2**	**0**

== Athletics ==
Men
Track

Athlete	Events	Round 1		Round 2		Semifinal		Final	
Athlete	Events	Result	Rank	Result	Rank	Result	Rank	Result	Rank
Dominic Demeritte	200 m	20.99	3 **Q**	DSQ		Did not advance			
Troy McIntosh	200 m	DNF		Did not advance					
Jamal Rolle	200 m	21.12	5 **q**	21.33	6	Did not advance			
Chris Brown	400 m	46.16	1 **Q**	—N/a		45.24	1 **Q**	45.19	4
Dennis Darling	400 m	DNF		—N/a		Did not advance			
Avard Moncur	400 m	45.82	3 **Q**	—N/a		45.72	5	Did not advance	
Douglas Lynes	400 m hurdles	52.06	4 **q**	—N/a		53.06	8	Did not advance	
Ednal Rolle	400 m hurdles	52.87	5	—N/a		Did not advance			
Dennis Darling; Avard Moncur; Dominic Demeritte; Chris Brown; Timothy Munnings*	4 × 400 m relay	3:03.96	1 **Q**	—N/a				DNF	

* Competed in relay heat only

Field

Athlete	Events	Qualification		Final	
Athlete	Events	Result	Rank	Result	Rank
Osbourne Moxey	Long jump	7.64	11 **q**	7.36	12
Antonio Saunders	Triple jump	—N/a		15.85	11
Donald Thomas	High jump	2.15	=1 **q**	2.23	4

Triple jumper Leevan Sands was initially named in the Bahamian team but later suspended for testing positive to methamphetamine, a hard stimulant.

Women
Track

Athlete	Events	Heat		Semifinal		Final	
Athlete	Events	Result	Rank	Result	Rank	Result	Rank
Tamicka Clarke	400 m	DNS		Did not advance			
Christine Amertil	400 m	51.85	1 **Q**	51.36	1 **Q**	51.52	4
**Tonique Williams**	400 m	52.58	1 **Q**	50.97	2 **Q**	50.76	2nd place, silver medalist(s)

Field

Athlete	Events	Qualification		Final	
Athlete	Events	Result	Rank	Result	Rank
Jackie Edwards	Long jump	6.42	5 **q**	6.46	8
**Laverne Eve**	Javelin throw	—N/a		60.54	2nd place, silver medalist(s)

Key

- Note–Ranks given for track events are within the athlete's heat only
- **Q** = Qualified for the next round
- **q** = Qualified for the next round as a fastest loser or, in field events, by position without achieving the qualifying target
- **NR** = National record
- **WB**= World Best
- N/A = Round not applicable for the event
- Bye = Athlete not required to compete in round

== Boxing ==
Athlete	Event	Round of 32	Round of 16	Quarterfinals	Semifinals	Final	
Athlete	Event	Opposition Result	Opposition Result	Opposition Result	Opposition Result	Opposition Result	Rank
Levan Stewart	Lightweight 60 kg	Paulus (MAL); **L** 13–25	Did not advance				
Carl Heild	Light Welterweight 64 kg	Crees (WAL); **L** 9–26	Did not advance				
Tureano Johnson	Welterweight 69 kg	Mvoue (CMR); **L** 34–37	Did not advance				

== Cycling ==
=== Road ===
Men

Athlete	Event	Time	Rank
Jonathan Massie	Road race	DNF	
Jonathan Massie	Time trial	59:32.68	40
Barron Musgrove	Road race	DNF	
Barron Musgrove	Time trial	1:01:44.79	52

== Swimming ==
Men

Athlete	Events	Heat		Semifinal		Final	
Athlete	Events	Time	Rank	Time	Rank	Time	Rank
Jeremy Knowles	50 m butterfly	25.11	14 **Q**	24.83	14	Did not advance	
Jeremy Knowles	100 m butterfly	54.42	8 **Q**	54.46	11	Did not advance	
Jeremy Knowles	200 m butterfly	2:00.17	3 **Q**	—N/a		1:59.37	4
Jeremy Knowles	200 m individual medley	2:03.16	5 **Q**	—N/a		2:02.85	8
Jeremy Knowles	400 m individual medley	4:27.40	7 **Q**	—N/a		4:26.72	7
Chris Vythoulkas	50 m freestyle	24.84	25	Did not advance			
Chris Vythoulkas	50 m backstroke	27.53	14 **Q**	27.55	13	Did not advance	
Chris Vythoulkas	100 m backstroke	59.62	19	Did not advance			
Chris Vythoulkas	50 m butterfly	25.61	16 **Q**	25.53	15	Did not advance	

Women

Athlete	Events	Heat		Semifinal		Final	
Athlete	Events	Time	Rank	Time	Rank	Time	Rank
Alana Dillette	100 m freestyle	59.55	17^{[1]}	59.78	16	Did not advance	
Alana Dillette	200 m freestyle	2:09.60	21	—N/a		Did not advance	
Alana Dillette	50 m backstroke	30.92	12	30.90	12	Did not advance	
Alana Dillette	100 m backstroke	1:07.69	17	Did not advance			
Alana Dillette	50 m butterfly	29.46	21	Did not advance			
Alana Dillette	100 m butterfly	1:06.17	18	Did not advance			

^{1} Lize-Mari Retief who qualified in 14th place subsequently withdrew from the semi-finals. This allowed Dillette to contest the semi as she was the first alternate.
