= Juliet Peterson =

New Zealand sport shooter

Medal record

Representing New Zealand

Women's Shooting

Commonwealth Games
Silver medal – second place	2006 Melbourne	50m Rifle – Prone
Bronze medal – third place	2002 Manchester	50m Rifle – Prone
Bronze medal – third place	2006 Melbourne	50m Rifle – Prone (Pairs)

Juliet Peterson (née Etherington, born 7 June 1979 in Hastings, New Zealand) is a former shooting competitor for New Zealand and media executive.

== Shooting ==
Competing under her maiden name at the 2002 Commonwealth Games she won a bronze medal in the 50m Rifle Prone event. At the 2006 Commonwealth Games she won a silver medal in the 50m Rifle Prone and a bronze medal in the 50m Rifle Prone Pairs event partnering Kathryn Mead.

== Media career ==
Peterson has worked in the New Zealand media industry for over two decades at TV3, TVNZ and Sky. Her first role as a recent graduate was with TV3 in 2000. She worked at rival network TVNZ for a period, including as programmer, and by November 2017 had been appointed general manager for digital content. In 2021 Peterson returned to TV3 via its parent company Discovery New Zealand, as senior director programming, leading the company's content and broadcaster video on demand (BVOD) functions. In 2024 she became Warner Bros. Discovery's vice president for Australia and New Zealand, transitioning into the newly created chief business officer role at Sky New Zealand when the network purchased TV3 for $1 in 2025. Peterson's departure from Sky was announced in March 2026.

== Personal life ==
Peterson is married with two children. She is a bowel cancer survivor.
