= Rebecca Cotton =

New Zealand basketball player

Personal information
- Born: 23 August 1974 (age 52) Nelson, New Zealand
- Listed height: 184 cm (6 ft 0 in)
Medals
Women's basketball
Representing New Zealand
Commonwealth Games
| Silver medal – second place | 2006 Melbourne | Team competition |

Rebecca Christina Cotton (born 23 August 1974 in Nelson) is a basketball player for New Zealand. She competed at the 2000 and 2004 Summer Olympics for the Tall Ferns New Zealand women's basketball team. At the 2006 Commonwealth Games she was part of the silver medal winning Tall Ferns side.
