= 2006 Commonwealth Games medal table =

Ranking of participants by medal total

The 2006 Commonwealth Games, officially known as the 18th Commonwealth Games, were a multi-sport event held in Melbourne, Victoria, Australia between 15 and 26 March 2006. A total of 4,071 athletes representing 71 Commonwealth Games Associations participated in 247 events from 16 sports. A total of 743 medals were awarded over the course of the Games.

== Medal table ==
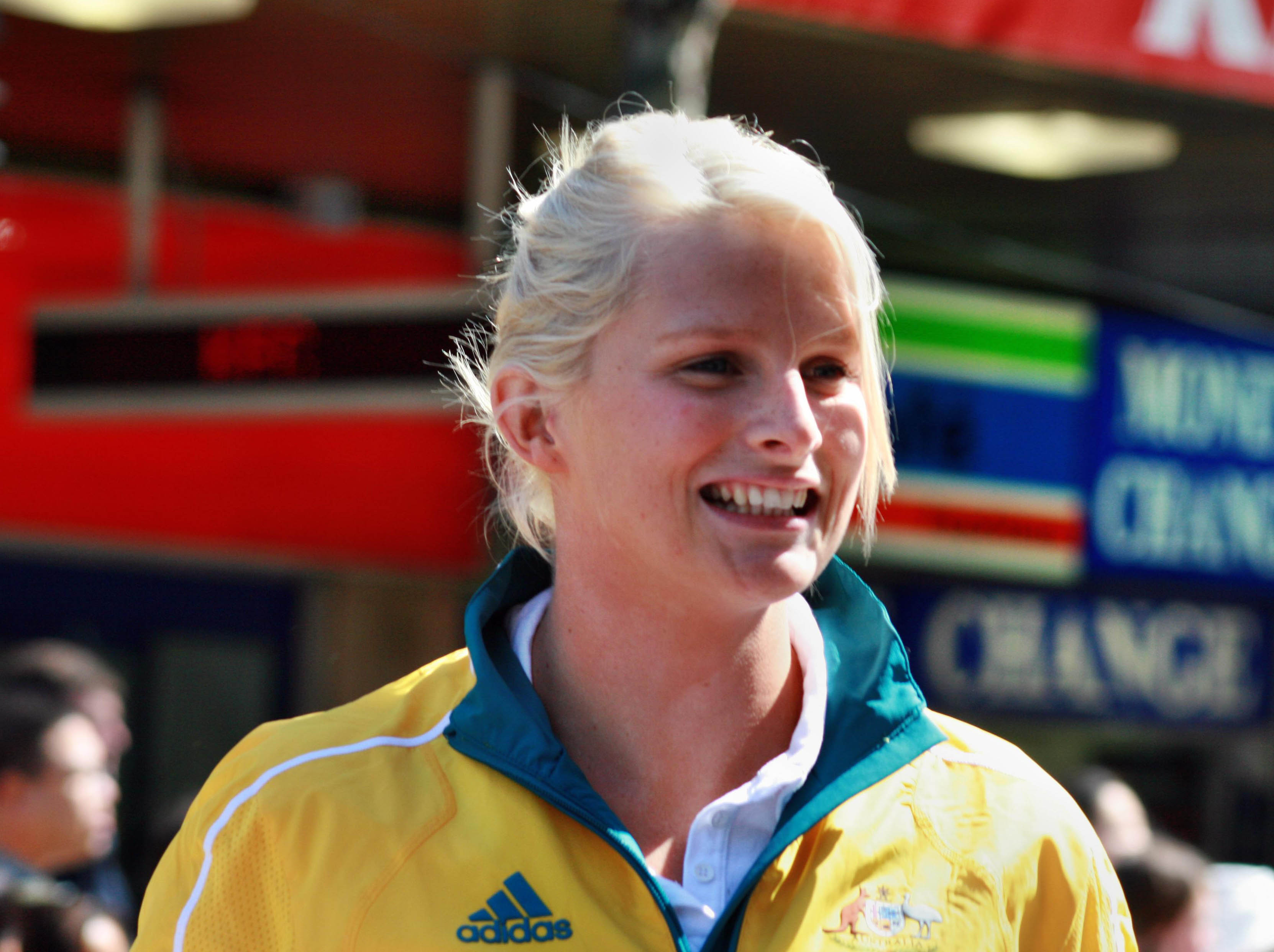
Leisel Jones won four gold medals in the swimming competition, sweeping the breaststroke events and the medley relay.

* Host nation (Australia)

Rank	CGA	Gold	Silver	Bronze	Total
1	Australia*	84	70	67	221
2	England	36	40	35	111
3	Canada	26	28	32	86
4	India	22	17	11	50
5	South Africa	12	13	13	38
6	Scotland	11	7	11	29
7	Jamaica	10	4	8	22
8	Malaysia	7	12	10	29
9	New Zealand	6	12	13	31
10	Kenya	6	5	7	18
11	Singapore	5	6	7	18
12	Nigeria	4	6	7	17
13	Wales	3	5	11	19
14	Cyprus	3	1	2	6
15	Ghana	2	0	1	3
15	Uganda	2	0	1	3
17	Pakistan	1	3	1	5
18	Papua New Guinea	1	1	0	2
19	Isle of Man	1	0	1	2
19	Namibia	1	0	1	2
19	Tanzania	1	0	1	2
22	Sri Lanka	1	0	0	1
23	Mauritius	0	3	0	3
24	Bahamas	0	2	0	2
24	Northern Ireland	0	2	0	2
26	Cameroon	0	1	2	3
27	Botswana	0	1	1	2
27	Malta	0	1	1	2
27	Nauru	0	1	1	2
30	Bangladesh	0	1	0	1
30	Grenada	0	1	0	1
30	Lesotho	0	1	0	1
33	Trinidad and Tobago	0	0	3	3
34	Seychelles	0	0	2	2
35	Barbados	0	0	1	1
35	Fiji	0	0	1	1
35	Mozambique	0	0	1	1
35	Samoa	0	0	1	1
35	Swaziland	0	0	1	1
Totals (39 entries)		245	244	255	744
