= Tafai Ioasa =

- Born: Tafai Ioasa; 7 October 1980 (age 46) Hastings, New Zealand
- Height: 1.82 m (6 ft 0 in)
- Weight: 96 kg (15 st 2 lb; 212 lb)

Rugby union career
- Position: Loose forward
Senior career
Years	Team	Apps	(Points)
- Hawke's Bay
International career
Years	Team	Apps	(Points)
2001–present	New Zealand Sevens		
Medal record
Men's rugby sevens
Representing New Zealand
Commonwealth Games
Gold medal – first place	2006 Melbourne	Team competition

Tafai Ioasa (born 7 October 1980) is a New Zealand rugby union player who has played for the New Zealand national rugby sevens team. He played rugby in Japan for Fukuoka Sanix Blues and is currently head coach of the Whanganui Collegiate School First XV since 2023. Formerly a head coach of the Hastings Boys High School First XV, The team were crowned national champions in 2019 and 2015.

== Career highlights ==
- New Zealand Sevens 2001–present
- Hawke's Bay Air New Zealand Cup 2005–2007
- NZ Heartland XV 2000
- 2006 Commonwealth Games gold medalist in Rugby 7's
