= Helen Norfolk =

New Zealand swimmer (born 1981)

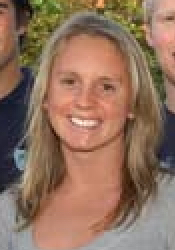
- Norfolk in 2007

Personal information
- Full name: Helen Pamela Norfolk
- Born: 27 August 1981 (age 44) Christchurch, New Zealand
- Height: 1.70 m (5 ft 7 in)
- Weight: 60 kg (132 lb)

Sport
- Sport: Swimming
- Strokes: Freestyle
- Club: North Shore Swimming Club
Medal record
Commonwealth Games
Bronze medal – third place	2006 Melbourne	4x200m freestyle

Helen Pamela Norfolk (born 27 August 1981 in Christchurch) is a New Zealand swimming competitor. She won a bronze medal with Lauren Boyle, Alison Fitch and Melissa Ingram in the 4 × 200 m freestyle relay at the 2006 Commonwealth Games.

She has competed at three Olympic Games (2000, 2004 & 2008) and two Commonwealth Games (1998 & 2006).

Norfolk is from North Shore.
