= Alexis Jordan (swimmer) =

Barbadian swimmer (born 1988)

Personal information
- Full name: Alexis Lynne Jordan
- Nationality: Barbados
- Born: 8 June 1988 (age 38)

Sport
- Sport: Swimming
- Strokes: Freestyle
- Club: Pirates Swim Club
- College team: University of Guelph (CAN)

Alexis Lynne Jordan (born 8 June 1988) is a National-Record-holding swimmer from Barbados. She swam for Barbados at the 2006 Commonwealth Games, 2006 Central American and Caribbean Games, 2005 World Championships, and CARIFTA and CCCAN Championships.
