= Olivia Rawlinson =

Manx swimmer

Personal information
- Full name: Olivia Rawlinson
- Nationality: Isle of Man
- Born: 26 October 1992 (age 33)

Sport
- Sport: Swimming
- Strokes: Individual Medley, Freestyle
Medal record
Representing Isle of Man
Island Games
Gold medal – first place	2009 Aland	200m freestyle
Gold medal – first place	2009 Aland	100m backstroke
Gold medal – first place	2009 Aland	200m backstroke
Gold medal – first place	2009 Aland	200m butterfly
Silver medal – second place	2005 Shetland	100m backstroke
Silver medal – second place	2005 Shetland	200m backstroke
Silver medal – second place	2005 Shetland	400m freestyle
Silver medal – second place	2007 Rhodes	200m backstroke
Silver medal – second place	2007 Rhodes	400m individual medley
Silver medal – second place	2009 Aland	200m individual medley
Silver medal – second place	2009 Aland	400m individual medley
Silver medal – second place	2009 Aland	4x100m freestyle relay
Bronze medal – third place	2005 Shetland	100m freestyle
Bronze medal – third place	2005 Shetland	200m freestyle
Bronze medal – third place	2005 Shetland	200m butterfly
Bronze medal – third place	2005 Shetland	200m individual medley
Bronze medal – third place	2005 Shetland	400m individual medley
Bronze medal – third place	2005 Shetland	Mixed 8x50m freestyle relay
Bronze medal – third place	2007 Rhodes	100m backstroke
Bronze medal – third place	2007 Rhodes	200m freestyle
Bronze medal – third place	2007 Rhodes	400m freestyle
Bronze medal – third place	2007 Rhodes	200m individual medley
Bronze medal – third place	2007 Rhodes	4x50m freestyle relay

Olivia Rawlinson (born 26 October 1992) is a swimmer from the Isle of Man. She competed mainly in the 200 m freestyle and medley events.

She represented the Isle of Man at the 2006 Commonwealth Games, becoming their youngest participant ever in the Commonwealth Games. Rawlinson made her international debut in the Shetland 2005 Island Games where she competed in eight races, winning a medal in every race.

== Early life and education ==
Rawlinson attended Ramsey Grammar School. She went on to graduated from the University of Hull with a Bachelor of Arts (BA) in Business and Marketing.
