= Melissa Ingram =

New Zealand swimmer (born 1985)

Personal information
- Full name: Melissa Jane Ingram
- Nationality: New Zealand
- Born: 24 June 1985 (age 41) Henderson, Auckland
- Height: 5 ft 10 in (1.78 m)
- Weight: 66 kg (146 lb)

Sport
- Sport: Swimming
- Strokes: Backstroke, freestyle
- College team: North Shore Swimming Club
Medal record
Commonwealth Games
| Bronze medal – third place | 2006 Melbourne | 4×200 m freestyle |
World Championships (SC)
| Bronze medal – third place | 2004 Indianapolis | 200 m backstroke |
Summer Universiade
| Silver medal – second place | 2005 İzmir | 4×200 m freestyle |
| Silver medal – second place | 2007 Bangkok | 100 m backstroke |
| Silver medal – second place | 2011 Shenzhen | 4×200 m freestyle |

Melissa Jane Ingram (born 24 June 1985 in Henderson, New Zealand) is a retired New Zealand swimmer. She won a bronze medal with Lauren Boyle, Helen Norfolk and Alison Fitch in the 4 × 200 m freestyle relay at the 2006 Commonwealth Games.

Ingram competed at the 2008 Summer Olympics and the 2012 Summer Olympics. She announced her retirement on 15 March 2013.
