= Geneviève Saumur =

Canadian swimmer (born 1987)

Personal information
- Full name: Geneviève Saumur
- National team: Canada
- Born: June 23, 1987 (age 39) Montreal, Quebec
- Height: 1.65 m (5 ft 5 in)
- Weight: 63 kg (139 lb)

Sport
- Sport: Swimming
- Strokes: Freestyle
- Club: Piscines du Parc Olympique
Medal record
Women's swimming
Representing Canada
Pan Pacific Championships
Silver medal – second place	2006 Victoria	4x100 m freestyle
Bronze medal – third place	2010 Irvine	4x100 m freestyle
Bronze medal – third place	2010 Irvine	4x200 m freestyle
Commonwealth Games
Bronze medal – third place	2006 Melbourne	4x100 m freestyle

Geneviève Saumur (born June 23, 1987) is a Canadian Olympic swimmer. She swam for Canada at the 2008 Olympics.

She currently holds the 200-metre freestyle (short-course and long-course) Canadian national record.

She has swum for Canada at:

- 2010 Pan Pacific Swimming Championships
- 2009 World Aquatics Championships
- 2008 Olympics
- 2007 World Championships
- 2006 Pan Pacs
- 2006 Commonwealth Games

She won a silver medal at the 2006 Pan Pacific Swimming Championships as a member of the 4x100-metre freestyle relay team, and a bronze medal in the same event at the 2006 Commonwealth Games. At the 2008 Summer Olympics, she was a member of the Canadian team that finished in 8th place in the 4x100-metre freestyle relay.

As of 2008, Saumur is studying at Ahuntsic CEGEP.
