= Guernsey at the 2006 Commonwealth Games =

- CGF code: GUE
- CGA: Guernsey Commonwealth Games Association
- Website: guernseycga.org.gg

in Melbourne, Australia
- Competitors: 28 in 8 sports
- Flag bearers: Opening: Closing:
- Medals: Gold 0 Silver 0 Bronze 0 Total 0

Commonwealth Games appearances (overview)
- 1970; 1974; 1978; 1982; 1986; 1990; 1994; 1998; 2002; 2006; 2010; 2014; 2018; 2022; 2026; 2030

Guernsey CGA logo

Team pin

The British Crown dependency of Guernsey was represented in the 2006 Commonwealth Games in Melbourne by a 28-member strong contingent, comprising 28 sportspersons and no officials. They competed in 8 sports, including athletics, badminton, cycling, lawn bowls, shooting, squash, swimming, and triathlon. They won no medals.

== Medals ==
	(gold)	(silver)	(bronze)	Total
Guernsey	0	0	0	0

== Guernsey's Commonwealth Games Team 2006 ==
=== Athletics ===
- Dale Garland, Decathlon & 400 m Hurdles
- Lee Merrien, 800 m & 1500 m

=== Badminton ===
- Elena Johnson & Paul Le Tocq, Mixed Doubles

=== Cycling ===
- Rob Smart, Mountain Bike
- Tobyn Horton, Road Race

=== Lawn bowls ===
- Alison Merrien
- Matt Le Ber
- Ian Merrien
- Paul Merrien
- Alan Merrien

=== Shooting ===
- Peter Jory & Adam Jory, Full Bore Rifle Pairs
- Nick Dewe & Stefan Roberts, Skeet

=== Squash ===
- Chris Simpson

=== Swimming ===
- Ben Lowndes – Freestyle, Butterfly and Individual Medley
- Jonathon Le Noury – 1500 m, 200 m and 100 m Freestyle
- Ian Powell – Backstroke, Butterfly and Individual Medley
- Gail Strobridge – Breaststroke and Individual Medley
- Thomas Hollingsworth, Jeremy Osborne, Jonathon Le Noury, & Ian Hubert - Relay team

=== Triathlon ===
- Samantha Herridge
- Alan Rowe
- Damian Thacker
- Ian Le Pelley

== Source ==
- Guernsey Commonwealth Games Association website
