= Kenya at the 2006 Commonwealth Games =

- CGF code: KEN
- CGA: National Olympic Committee of Kenya

in Melbourne, Australia
- Competitors: 102 in 11 sports
- Flag bearers: Opening: Closing:
- Medals Ranked 10thth: Gold 6 Silver 5 Bronze 7 Total 18

Commonwealth Games appearances (overview)
- 1954; 1958; 1962; 1966; 1970; 1974; 1978; 1982; 1986; 1990; 1994; 1998; 2002; 2006; 2010; 2014; 2018; 2022; 2026; 2030

Kenya is represented at the 2006 Commonwealth Games in Melbourne by a xx-member strong contingent comprising 102 sportspersons and xx officials.

== Medals ==
=== Gold ===
- Augustine Choge, Athletics, Men's 5000 m
- Lucy Wangui, Athletics, Women's 10,000 m
- Alex Kipchirchir Rono, Athletics, Men's 800 m
- Ezekiel Kemboi Yano, Athletics, Men's 3000 m Steeplechase
- Janeth Jepkosgei, Athletics, Women's 800 m
- Isabella Ochichi, Athletics, Women's 5000 m

=== Silver ===
- Fred Tumbo, Athletics, Men's Marathon
- Hellen Cherono Koskei, Athletics, Women's Marathon
- Evelyne Nganga, Athletics, Women's 10,000 m
- Wesley Kiprotich Koech, Athletics, Men's 3000 m Steeplechase
- Geoffrey Kipngeno, Athletics, Men's 10,000 m

=== Bronze ===
- Benjamin Limo, Athletics, Men's 5000 m
- John Litei Nkamasiai, Athletics, Men's 800 m
- Charles James Menya, Boxing, Men's Lightweight (– 60 kg)
- Black Moses Mathenge, Boxing, Men's Light Welterweight (– 64 kg)
- Joshua Ndere Makonjio, Boxing, Men's Light Heavyweight (– 81 kg)
- Reuben Kosgei Seroney, Athletics, Men's 3000 m Steeplechase
- Lucy Wangui Kabuu, Athletics, Women's 5000 m

== Results by event ==
=== Swimming ===
- David Dunford
- Nasra Nandha
- Amar Shah
- Ramadhan Vyombo

== See also ==
- Kenya at the 2004 Summer Olympics
- Kenya at the 2008 Summer Olympics
