= Isle of Man at the 2006 Commonwealth Games =

Sporting event delegation

- CGF code: IOM
- CGA: Commonwealth Games Association of the Isle of Man

in Melbourne, Australia
- Competitors: 27
- Medals Ranked 19th: Gold 1 Silver 0 Bronze 1 Total 2

Commonwealth Games appearances (overview)
- 1958; 1962; 1966; 1970; 1974; 1978; 1982; 1986; 1990; 1994; 1998; 2002; 2006; 2010; 2014; 2018; 2022; 2026; 2030

The Isle of Man was represented at the 2006 Commonwealth Games in Melbourne by a 36-member strong contingent, comprising 27 sportsmen and women and 9 officials. Amongst their number was the Commonwealth Games' youngest ever competitor, Olivia Rawlinson, a swimmer aged 13. The team captain was Dane Harrop, while the flag bearer was Harry Creevy, a rifle shooter.

The Melbourne Cricket Ground was decorated with creatures to represent the participating countries; the Isle of Man's creature is a basking shark, owing to the high number of sightings of the species in Manx waters.

At the 2006 Games, the Isle of Man finished in joint-nineteenth place, winning two medals, including a gold, won by Mark Cavendish. This brought the Isle of Man's total medals won to nine since it first took part in Cardiff in 1958. Before Mark Cavendish won gold in Melbourne, the Isle of Man had not claimed a gold since 1986, when Nigel Kelly won the shooting individual men's skeet in Edinburgh.

== Medals ==
	Gold	Silver	Bronze	Total
Isle of Man	1	0	1	2

=== Gold ===
Cycling:

Mark Cavendish, Men's Scratch

=== Bronze ===
Shooting:

Trevor Boyles & Dave Walton, Men's Trap Pairs
