= Namibia at the 2006 Commonwealth Games =

Sporting event delegation

- CGF code: NAM
- CGA: Namibia National Olympic Committee
- Website: olympic.org.na
- Medals: Gold 1 Silver 0 Bronze 1 Total 2

Commonwealth Games appearances (overview)
- 1994; 1998; 2002; 2006; 2010; 2014; 2018; 2022; 2026; 2030

Namibia is represented at the 2006 Commonwealth Games.

== Medals ==
	(gold)	(silver)	(bronze)	Total
Namibia	1	0	1	2

=== Gold ===
- Jafet Uutoni, Boxing, Light Flyweight 48 kg

=== Bronze ===
- Friedhelm Ferdinand Sack, Shooting, Men's 10m Air Pistol
