= Sri Lanka at the 2006 Commonwealth Games =

- CG code: SRI
- CGA: National Olympic Committee of Sri Lanka
- Website: srilankaolympic.org

in Melbourne, Australia
- Competitors: 67
- Medals: Gold 1 Silver 0 Bronze 0 Total 1

Commonwealth Games appearances (overview)
- 1938; 1950; 1954; 1958; 1962; 1966; 1970; 1974; 1978; 1982; 1986; 1990; 1994; 1998; 2002; 2006; 2010; 2014; 2018; 2022; 2026; 2030

Sri Lanka was represented at the 2006 Commonwealth Games in Melbourne by a 67-member strong contingent comprising xx sportspersons and xx officials.

== Medals ==
	(gold)	(silver)	(bronze)	Total
Sri Lanka	1	0	0	1

=== Gold ===
- Chinthana Vidanage - men's 62 kg category (first weightlifting gold medal for Sri Lanka)
