= 2006 in South African sport =

This is a list of events in South African sport in 2006.

== Athletics ==
- 12 March - Mbulaeni Mulaudzi wins silver in the 800 metres event at the 2006 IAAF World Indoor Championships, held in Moscow, Russia
- 19 March - Sunette Viljoen wins gold in the Women's Javelin at the 2006 Commonwealth Games in Melbourne
- 20 March - Janus Robberts wins gold in the Men's Shot put at the Commonwealth Games
  - Geraldine Pillay wins silver in the Women's 100 m at the Commonwealth Games
  - Hilton Langenhoven wins silver in the Men's 100 m T12 at the Commonwealth Games
- 21 March - Elizna Naude wins gold in the Women's Discus at the Commonwealth Games
- 23 March - Louis van Zyl wins gold in the Men's 400 m Hurdles at the Commonwealth Games
  - Anika Smit wins gold in the Women's High Jump at the Commonwealth Games
  - Alwyn Myburgh wins silver in the Men's 400 m Hurdles at the Commonwealth Games
  - David Roos wins silver in the Men's 200 m T46 at the Commonwealth Games
  - Geraldine Pillay wins bronze in the Women's 200 m at the Commonwealth Games
- 24 March - Christiaan Harmse wins bronze in the Men's Hammer Throw at the Commonwealth Games
- 25 March Khotso Mokoena wins silver in the Men's Triple Jump at the Commonwealth Games
  - Lee Roy Newton, Leigh Julius, Snyman Prinsloo and Sherwin Vries win silver in the Men's 4 × 100 m Relay at the Commonwealth Games

== Aquatics ==
- 16 March - Lyndon Ferns, Ryk Neethling, Roland Schoeman and Gerhard Zandberg win gold in the Men's 4 × 100 m Freestyle Relay at the 2006 Commonwealth Games in Melbourne and sets up a new Games record of 3:14.97
- 17 March - Natalie du Toit wins gold in the Women's 50 m EAD Freestyle at the Commonwealth Games bettering the existing record twice (during Heat 2 and Final A) to 29.27 seconds.
  - Gerhard Zandberg wins bronze in the Men's 50 metre Backstroke at the Commonwealth Games
  - Lize-Mari Retief ties with Alice Mills of Australia for bronze in the Women's 50 metre Butterfly at the Commonwealth Games
- 18 March - Roland Schoeman wins gold in the Men's 50 m Butterfly at the Commonwealth Games
  - Johannes du Rand wins silver in the Men's 200 m Backstroke at the Commonwealth Games
  - Suzaan van Biljon - wins bronze in the Women's 200 m Breaststroke at the Commonwealth Games
- 19 March Natalie du Toit wins gold in the Women's 100 m EAD Freestyle at the Commonwealth Games
  - Ryk Neethling wins silver in the Men's 100 m Freestyle at the Commonwealth Games
  - Roland Schoeman wins bronze in the Men's 100 m Freestyle at the Commonwealth Games
- 21 March - Roland Schoeman wins gold in the Men's 50 m Freestyle at the Commonwealth Games
  - Hercules Prinsloo win bronze in the Men's 1500 m Freestyle at the Commonwealth Games

== Boxing ==
- 25 March - Bongani Mwelase wins gold in the Welterweight 69 kg boxing match at the 2006 Commonwealth Games in Melbourne
  - Jackson van Tonder Chauke wins silver in the Flyweight 51 kg boxing match at the Commonwealth Games

== Cricket ==
=== January ===
- 6 January - The Proteas lose the 3rd Test against Australia by 8 wickets at the Sydney Cricket Ground, Sydney to lose the 3-Test Series 2–0
- 15 January - The Proteas beat the Australia cricket team by 5 wickets at the Brisbane Cricket Ground, Woolloongabba, Brisbane in the VB Series
- 17 January - The Proteas lose to Sri Lanka by 94 runs at the Brisbane Cricket Ground, Woolloongabba, Brisbane in the VB Series
- 20 January - The Proteas lose to Australia by 59 runs at the Docklands Stadium, Melbourne in the VB Series
- 24 January - The Proteas beat the Sri Lanka by 9 runs at the Adelaide Oval, Adelaide in the VB Series
- 31 January - The Proteas beat the Sri Lanka by 5 runs at the WACA Ground, Perth in the VB Series

=== February ===
- 3 February - The Proteas lose to Australia by 80 runs at the Docklands Stadium, Melbourne in the VB Series
- 5 February - The Proteas lose to Australia by 57 runs at the Sydney Cricket Ground, Sydney in the VB Series
- 7 February - The Proteas lose to Sri Lanka by 76 runs at the Bellerive Oval, Hobart in the VB Series
- 24 February - The Proteas beat Australia by 2 runs at the Wanderers Stadium, Johannesburg in a Twenty20 cricket match
- 26 February - The Proteas beat Australia by 6 wickets at SuperSport Park, Centurion outside Pretoria in the 1st One Day International

=== March ===
- 3 March - The Proteas beat Australia by 196 runs at Newlands, Cape Town, in the 2nd One-day International.
- 5 March - The Proteas lose to Australia by 24 runs at St George's Park in Port Elizabeth in the 3rd One-day International.
- 10 March - The Proteas lose to Australia by one wicket in Durban in the 4th ODI.
- 12 March - The Proteas beat Australia by one wicket at the Wanderers in the final ODI. Both teams reached record-breaking scores of 434 and 438 in their 50 overs, and South Africa took the series 3–2.

=== May ===
- 7 May - The Proteas beat New Zealand by four wickets in the Third Test of the series, winning their final series of the year 2–0.

== Cycling ==
- 26 March - David George wins silver in the Men's 160-180 km Road Race at the 2006 Commonwealth Games in Melbourne

== Football (Rugby Sevens) ==
- 16 March - South Africa wins two matches (63–7 against Uganda, 12–10 against Samoa) and loses one (19–26 to Tonga) in their Group D fixture of the Rugby Sevens at the 2006 Commonwealth Games in Melbourne
- 17 March - South Africa loses 20–14 to Australia in the medal quarterfinal, wins 14–17 to[Canada in the Plate semi-finals, but then loses 29–28 to Wales, earning them 6th position overall at the 2006 Commonwealth Games.

== Football (Rugby Union) ==
=== June ===
- 10 June - The South African national rugby team (Springboks) beat Scotland 36 - 16 in Durban
- 17 June - The Springboks beat Scotland 29 - 15 in Port Elizabeth
  - The South African national women's rugby team (Springbok Women's team) beat the Netherlands 43 - 12 in Port Elizabeth
- 24 June - The South African national rugby team (Springboks) lose to France (les Tricolores) 26–36 at Newlands Cape Town
  - The Springbok Women's team beat the Netherlands 35 - 0 in Durban

=== July ===
- 15 July - The South African national rugby team (Springboks) lose to Australia (Wallabies) 0 - 49 in the Tri Nations series at Brisbane, Australia
- 22 July - The Springboks lose to New Zealand (All Blacks) 17 - 35 in the Tri Nations series at Wellington, New Zealand

=== August ===
- 5 August - The South African national rugby team (Springboks) lose to Australia (Wallabies) 18 - 20 in the Tri Nations series at the Telstra Stadium in Sydney, Australia
- 26 August - The Springboks lose to New Zealand (All Blacks) 26 - 45 in the Tri Nations series at Loftus Versfeld, Pretoria
- 31 August - The South African national women's rugby team (Springbok Women's team) lose to Australia (Wallaroos) 12 - 68 in the 2006 Women's Rugby World Cup at Edmonton, Alberta, Canada

=== September ===
- 2 September - The South African national rugby team (Springboks) beat New Zealand (All Blacks) 21 - 20 in the Tri Nations series at Royal Bafokeng Stadium in Rustenburg
- 4 September - The South African national women's rugby team (Springbok Women's team) lose to England 8 - 74 in the 2006 Women's Rugby World Cup at Edmonton, Alberta, Canada
- 8 September - The Springbok Women's team lose to Ireland 0 - 37 in the Women's Rugby World Cup at St. Albert, Alberta, Canada
- 9 September - The Springboks beat Australia (Wallabies) 24 - 16 in the Tri Nations series at Ellis Park in Johannesburg
- 12 September - The Springbok Women's team lose to Samoa 10 - 43 at St. Albert, Alberta in the Women's Rugby World Cup
- 16 September - The Springbok Women's team lose to Kazakhstan 0 - 36 at Edmonton, Alberta, placing them at the bottom of the log in the Women's Rugby World Cup

== Football (soccer) ==
- 22 January - The South African national football team (Bafana Bafana) loses 0–2 to Guinea at the 25th African Cup of Nations, held in Egypt.
- 26 January - Bafana Bafana loses 0–2 to Tunisia and is knocked out of the running at the 25th African Cup of Nations.
- 30 January - Bafana Bafana loses 0–1 to Zambia in their final match, exiting the 25th African Cup of Nations without earning a single point or a single goal.

== Gymnastics ==
- 21 March - Francki van Rooyen wins bronze in the Women's Floor at the 2006 Commonwealth Games in Melbourne

== Hockey (field) ==
- 7 September - The South African men's hockey team loses 0–2 to the Netherlands at the 2006 Men's Hockey World Cup in Mönchengladbach, Germany
- 9 September - The South African men's hockey team draws with India 1–1 at the Hockey World Cup
- 10 September - The South African men's hockey team draws with South Korea 2–2 at the Hockey World Cup
- 12 September - The South African men's hockey team loses to Germany 0–5 at the Hockey World Cup
- 13 September - The South African men's hockey team loses to England 1–3 at the Hockey World Cup
- 16 September - The South African men's hockey team loses to Japan 2–5 at the Hockey World Cup
- 17 September - The South African men's hockey team loses to India 0–1 placing them at the bottom of the log in the Hockey World Cup

== Lawn Bowls ==
- 20 March - South Africa wins bronze in the Men's Lawn bowls Triples at the 2006 Commonwealth Games in Melbourne
- 24 March - Lorna Trigwell wins bronze in the Women's Lawn Bowls Singles at the Commonwealth Games

== Motorsport ==
- 29 January - South Africa finishes 20th in the sprint race and 5th in the feature race of the South African leg of the 2005–06 A1 Grand Prix season held at the Durban street circuit, climbing to share 14th place with Mexico
- 12 February - South Africa finishes 21st in the sprint race and 11th in the feature race of the Indonesian leg held at the Sentul Circuit, dropping to 15th place
- 26 February - South Africa finishes 17th in the sprint race and 18th in the feature race of the Mexican leg held at Fundidora Park, dropping to 16th place
- 12 March - South Africa finishes 11th in the sprint race and last (22nd) in the feature race of the American leg held at Mazda Raceway Laguna Seca near Monterey, California, dropping to 17th place
- 2 April - South Africa finishes 11th in the sprint race and last (14th) in the feature race of the Chinese leg held at the Shanghai International Circuit in China, staying at 17th place at the end of the 2005–06 A1 Grand Prix season
- 1 October - South Africa finishes 1st in the sprint race with the fastest lap time but crashes on the second corner at the start of the feature race of the Netherland leg of the 2006-07 A1 Grand Prix season held at the Circuit Park Zandvoort, placing South Africa 5th along with the Netherlands
- 8 October - South Africa only completes 4 laps of the sprint race and is placed 21st while in the feature race, South Africa comes 11th in the Czech leg held at the Masaryk Circuit, near Brno dropping South Africa to 12th

== Shooting ==
- 18 March - Allan Stuart McDonald and Daniel Francois van Tonder win bronze in the Men's 25 m Standard Pistol Pairs at the 2006 Commonwealth Games in Melbourne
- 20 March - Allan Stuart McDonald and Daniel Francois van Tonder win bronze in the Men's 25 m Centre Fire Pistol Pairs at the Commonwealth Games
- 21 March - Diane Swanton wins gold in the Women's Trap at the Commonwealth Games
- 23 March - Esmari van Reenen wins silver at the Women's 50 m Rifle 3 Positions at the Commonwealth Games
  - Byron Swanton wins silver at the Men's Double Trap at the Commonwealth Games

== Weightlifting ==
- 21 March - Babalwa Ndleleni wins bronze in the Women's 75 kg Weightlifting at the 2006 Commonwealth Games in Melbourne.
