= Singapore at the Commonwealth Games =

- CG code: SGP
- CGA: Singapore National Olympic Council
- Website: singaporeolympics.com
- Medals Ranked 13th: Gold 41 Silver 31 Bronze 37 Total 109

Commonwealth Games appearances (overview)
- 1958; 1962; 1966; 1970; 1974; 1978; 1982; 1986; 1990; 1994; 1998; 2002; 2006; 2010; 2014; 2018; 2022; 2026; 2030

Singapore has competed in the Commonwealth Games since 1958, and has participated in fifteen of the twenty editions. Singapore first participated as a crown colony in 1958 and 1962, and as a sovereign country within the Commonwealth from 1966 onwards. The country abbreviation is SGP.

The Singapore National Olympic Council (SNOC) is the body in Singapore responsible for selecting athletes to represent Singapore at the Commonwealth Games. The SNOC is a member of the Commonwealth Games Federation.

== Overall medal tally ==
With 109 medals (as of 2022), Singapore is currently thirteenth in the all-time tally of medals.

| Games | Year | Host | Dates | Gold | Silver | Bronze | Total |
British Empire and Commonwealth Games
| VI | 1958 | Cardiff, Wales, | 18 – 26 July | 2 | 0 | 0 | 2 |
| VII | 1962 | Perth, Australia | 22 November – 1 December | 2 | 0 | 0 | 2 |
| VIII | 1966 | Kingston, Jamaica | 4 – 13 August | 0 | 0 | 0 | 0 |
British Commonwealth Games
| IX | 1970 | Edinburgh, Scotland | 16 – 25 July | 0 | 1 | 1 | 2 |
| X | 1974 | Christchurch, New Zealand | 24 January – 2 February | 0 | 0 | 1 | 1 |
Commonwealth Games
| XI | 1978 | Edmonton, Alberta, Canada | 3 – 12 August | 0 | 0 | 0 | 0 |
| XII | 1982 | Brisbane, Australia | 30 September – 9 October | 0 | 0 | 1 | 1 |
| XIII | 1986 | Edinburgh, Scotland | 24 July – 2 August | 0 | 0 | 1 | 1 |
| XIV | 1990 | Auckland, New Zealand | 24 January – 3 February | 0 | 0 | 0 | 0 |
| XV | 1994 | Victoria, Canada | 18 – 28 August | 0 | 0 | 0 | 0 |
| XVI | 1998 | Kuala Lumpur, Malaysia | 11 – 21 September | 0 | 0 | 0 | 0 |
| XVII | 2002 | Manchester, England | 25 July – 4 August | 4 | 2 | 7 | 13 |
| XVIII | 2006 | Melbourne, Australia | 15 – 26 March | 5 | 6 | 7 | 18 |
| XIX | 2010 | Delhi, India | 3 – 14 October | 11 | 11 | 9 | 31 |
| XX | 2014 | Glasgow, Scotland | 23 July – 3 August | 8 | 5 | 4 | 17 |
| XXI | 2018 | Gold Coast, Australia | 4 – 15 April | 5 | 2 | 2 | 9 |
| XXII | 2022 | Birmingham, England | 28 July – 8 August | 4 | 4 | 4 | 12 |
| Total | | | | 41 | 31 | 37 | 109 |

== Sports ==
Singapore's first four medals (all of them gold) came from weightlifting. Altogether, Singapore has won eight medals in weightlifting, but none since 1986. No other gold medals were won until 2002, when table tennis first appeared on the Games programme. Singapore was an immediate beneficiary, winning three golds in 2002, four in 2006, six in 2010, and six again in 2014 Commonwealth Games, topping the medal standings in the sport each time.

The country also won a gold medal in badminton in 2002, and eight gold medals in shooting in various years. Singapore's first swimming medal came in 2014. Singapore won gold in table tennis and badminton at the 2022 Commonwealth Games. Singaporeans have won medals in seven sports at the Commonwealth Games: badminton, boxing, gymnastics, shooting, swimming, table tennis and weightlifting.

| Sport | Gold | Silver | Bronze | Total | Years won |
|---|---|---|---|---|---|
| Badminton | 2 | 5 | 6 | 13 | 2002, 2006, 2010, 2014, 2022 |
| Boxing | 0 | 0 | 1 | 1 | 1974 |
| Gymnastics | 0 | 1 | 2 | 3 | 2010, 2014 |
| Shooting | 10 | 5 | 8 | 23 | 2006, 2010, 2014, 2018 |
| Swimming | 0 | 3 | 1 | 4 | 2014, 2018, 2022 |
| Table tennis | 25 | 16 | 16 | 57 | 2002, 2006, 2010, 2014, 2018, 2022 |
| Weightlifting | 4 | 1 | 3 | 8 | 1958, 1962, 1970, 1974, 1982, 1986 |

== Commonwealth Youth Games ==
=== Medals by Games ===
| Games | Gold | Silver | Bronze | Total |
|---|---|---|---|---|
| 2000 Edinburgh | 0 | 0 | 0 | 0 |
| 2004 Bendigo | 3 | 2 | 5 | 10 |
| 2008 Pune | 2 | 5 | 4 | 11 |
| 2011 Isle of Man | 0 | 0 | 1 | 1 |
| 2015 Apia | 0 | 0 | 0 | 0 |
| 2017 Nassau | 7 | 4 | 6 | 17 |
| Totals (6 entries) | 12 | 11 | 16 | 39 |

== See also ==
- Singapore at the Olympics
- Singapore at the Asian Games
