= Swimming at the 2006 Commonwealth Games – Men's 200 metre freestyle =

== Men's 200 m Freestyle - Final ==
Pos.	Lane	Athlete	R.T.	50 m	100 m	150 m	200 m	Tbh.
	4	Ross Davenport (ENG)	0.79	25.17; 25.17	52.42; 27.25	1:19.72; 27.30	1:47.29; 27.57	
	2	Simon Burnett (ENG)	0.74	24.85; 24.85	52.15; 27.30	1:20.49; 28.34	1:47.38; 26.89	0.09
	6	Brent Hayden (CAN)	0.78	24.87; 24.87	51.95; 27.08	1:19.58; 27.63	1:47.41; 27.83	0.12
4	5	Richard Say (CAN)	0.74	25.35; 25.35	52.62; 27.27	1:20.13; 27.51	1:47.44; 27.31	0.15
5	1	David Carry (SCO)	0.84	25.22; 25.22	52.58; 27.36	1:20.67; 28.09	1:48.13; 27.46	0.84
6	3	Ryk Neethling (RSA)	0.76	24.61; 24.61	52.28; 27.67	1:20.62; 28.34	1:48.77; 28.15	1.48
7	7	Richard Soane (SCO)	0.74	25.60; 25.60	53.76; 28.16	1:22.21; 28.45	1:49.86; 27.65	2.57
8	8	Nicholas Ffrost (AUS)	0.81	25.89; 25.89	54.32; 28.43	1:22.32; 28.00	1:50.00; 27.68	2.71

== Men's 200 m Freestyle - Heats ==
=== Men's 200 m Freestyle - Heat 01 ===
Pos.	Lane	Athlete	R.T.	50 m	100 m	150 m	200 m	Tbh.
1	5	Daniel Bego (MAS)	0.70	26.46; 26.46	55.44; 28.98	1:25.01; 29.57	1:52.45; 27.44	
2	3	Steven Mangroo (SEY)	0.80	27.72; 27.72	58.09; 30.37	1:30.06; 31.97	2:02.68; 32.62	10.23
3	4	Stefan Lee (SRI)	0.81	28.07; 28.07	58.73; 30.66	1:30.68; 31.95	2:02.93; 32.25	10.48

=== Men's 200 m Freestyle - Heat 02 ===
Pos.	Lane	Athlete	R.T.	50 m	100 m	150 m	200 m	Tbh.
1	4	Jonathon Le Noury (GUE)	0.82	26.79; 26.79	56.57; 29.78	1:26.89; 30.32	1:57.31; 30.42	
2	5	Colin Bensadon (GIB)	0.86	27.71; 27.71	57.90; 30.19	1:28.74; 30.84	1:59.98; 31.24	2.67
3	3	Ben Lowndes (GUE)	0.84	29.53; 29.53	1:01.00; 31.47	1:33.06; 32.06	2:02.90; 29.84	5.59
4	7	Anthony Wickramasinghe (SRI)	0.83	28.55; 28.55	1:00.15; 31.60	1:33.18; 33.03	2:05.94; 32.76	8.63
5	6	Bradford Worrell (LCA)	0.65	28.26; 28.26	59.65; 31.39	1:31.85; 32.20	2:06.02; 34.17	8.71
6	2	Joseph Arsacularatne (SRI)	0.83	29.54; 29.54	1:03.23; 33.69	1:38.68; 35.45	2:15.51; 36.83	18.20

=== Men's 200 m Freestyle - Heat 03 ===
Pos.	Lane	Athlete	R.T.	50 m	100 m	150 m	200 m	Tbh.
1	5	Brent Hayden (CAN)	0.77	25.49; 25.49	53.27; 27.78	1:21.36; 28.09	1:48.93; 27.57	
2	6	Andrew Hunter (SCO)	0.75	25.61; 25.61	53.53; 27.92	1:21.70; 28.17	1:49.17; 27.47	0.24
3	4	David Carry (SCO)	0.83	25.71; 25.71	53.61; 27.90	1:21.69; 28.08	1:49.28; 27.59	0.35
4	3	Brian Johns (CAN)	0.85	25.57; 25.57	53.24; 27.67	1:21.27; 28.03	1:50.13; 28.86	1.20
5	2	Darian Townsend (RSA)	0.69	25.80; 25.80	53.93; 28.13	1:23.21; 29.28	1:54.04; 30.83	5.11
6	7	Zhirong Tay (SIN)	0.61	26.79; 26.79	55.95; 29.16	1:25.51; 29.56	1:55.84; 30.33	6.91
7	1	Ronald Cowen (BER)	0.84	26.70; 26.70	55.69; 28.99	1:25.53; 29.84	1:56.12; 30.59	7.19
8	8	Jeremy Osborne (GUE)	0.89	28.33; 28.33	58.47; 30.14	1:29.85; 31.38	2:00.28; 30.43	11.35

=== Men's 200 m Freestyle - Heat 04 ===
Pos.	Lane	Athlete	R.T.	50 m	100 m	150 m	200 m	Tbh.
1	5	Ross Davenport (ENG)	0.83	25.32; 25.32	52.76; 27.44	1:20.44; 27.68	1:48.76; 28.32	
2	4	Ryk Neethling (RSA)	0.72	25.16; 25.16	52.88; 27.72	1:21.00; 28.12	1:48.88; 27.88	0.12
3	3	Kenrick Monk (AUS)	0.70	25.26; 25.26	52.97; 27.71	1:21.04; 28.07	1:49.61; 28.57	0.85
4	6	Jean Basson (RSA)	0.73	25.95; 25.95	53.78; 27.83	1:21.17; 27.39	1:49.63; 28.46	0.87
5	2	Dean Milwain (ENG)	0.81	25.70; 25.70	53.32; 27.62	1:21.67; 28.35	1:50.04; 28.37	1.28
6	7	Shaune Fraser (CAY)	0.75	26.19; 26.19	54.25; 28.06	1:22.98; 28.73	1:52.15; 29.17	3.39
7	8	Liam Du Feu (JER)	0.74	27.00; 27.00	57.25; 30.25	1:28.22; 30.97	1:59.13; 30.91	10.37
8	1	Chris Hackel (MRI)	0.82	27.70; 27.70	58.10; 30.40	1:28.82; 30.72	1:59.79; 30.97	11.03

=== Men's 200 m Freestyle - Heat 05 ===
Pos.	Lane	Athlete	R.T.	50 m	100 m	150 m	200 m	Tbh.
1	6	Richard Say (CAN)	0.72	25.73; 25.73	53.83; 28.10	1:21.26; 27.43	1:48.77; 27.51	
2	4	Simon Burnett (ENG)	0.73	25.24; 25.24	52.84; 27.60	1:21.03; 28.19	1:48.93; 27.90	0.16
3	5	Nicholas Ffrost (AUS)	0.79	25.74; 25.74	53.18; 27.44	1:20.93; 27.75	1:49.33; 28.40	0.56
4	3	Andrew Mewing (AUS)	0.92	25.64; 25.64	53.47; 27.83	1:21.83; 28.36	1:50.14; 28.31	1.37
5	2	Robert Renwick (SCO)	0.78	25.84; 25.84	53.99; 28.15	1:22.35; 28.36	1:50.50; 28.15	1.73
6	7	Andrew McMillan (NZL)	0.76	25.99; 25.99	54.31; 28.32	1:22.67; 28.36	1:51.01; 28.34	2.24
7	1	Mingzhe Cheah (SIN)	0.83	27.16; 27.16	57.30; 30.14	1:27.54; 30.24	1:57.70; 30.16	8.93
8	8	Brad Hamilton (JAM)	0.69	26.95; 26.95	56.73; 29.78	1:28.17; 31.44	1:59.54; 31.37	10.77
