= Singapore at the 2006 Commonwealth Games =

- CGF code: SIN
- CGA: Singapore National Olympic Council
- Website: www.singaporeolympics.com

in Melbourne, Australia
- Competitors: 63 in 8 sports
- Officials: 38
- Medals Ranked 11th: Gold 5 Silver 6 Bronze 7 Total 18

Commonwealth Games appearances (overview)
- 1958; 1962; 1966; 1970; 1974; 1978; 1982; 1986; 1990; 1994; 1998; 2002; 2006; 2010; 2014; 2018; 2022; 2026; 2030

The Official Logo of the Singapore Commonwealth Games Association

Singapore was represented at the 2006 Commonwealth Games in Melbourne by a 101-member strong contingent comprising 63 sportspersons and 38 officials. Singapore won a total of 18 medals, 5 of them gold: its best ever performance at the Commonwealth Games.

== Medallists ==
	(gold)	(silver)	(bronze)	Total
Singapore	5	6	7	18

Medal	Name	Sport	Event	Date
Gold	Li Jiawei; Sharon Tan; Zhang Xueling	Table Tennis	Women's Team	
Gold	Yang Zi; Zhang Xueling	Table Tennis	Mixed Doubles	
Gold	Li Jiawei; Zhang Xueling	Table Tennis	Women's Doubles	
Gold	Zhang Xueling	Table Tennis	Women's Singles	
Gold	On Shaw Ming	Shooting	Men's 25m Centre Fire Pistol	
Silver	Cai Xiaoli; Jason Ho; Yang Zi	Table Tennis	Men's Team	
Silver	Cai Xiaoli; Li Jiawei	Table Tennis	Mixed Doubles	
Silver	Sharon Tan; Yan Xu	Table Tennis	Women's Doubles	
Silver	Li Jiawei	Table Tennis	Women's Singles	
Silver	Zhang Jin	Shooting	Men's 10m Air Rifle	
Silver	Jiang Yan Mei; Li Yujia	Badminton	Mixed doubles	
Bronze	Ong Jun Hong; Zhang Jin	Shooting	Men's 10m Air Rifle (Pairs)	
Bronze	Zhang Jingna; Vanessa Yu Zhen Yong	Shooting	Women's 10m Air Rifle (Pairs)	
Bronze	Vanessa Yu Zhen Yong	Shooting	Women's 10m Air Rifle (Singles)	
Bronze	Jason Ho; Sharon Tan	Table Tennis	Mixed Doubles	
Bronze	Cai Xiaoli; Yang Zi	Table Tennis	Men's Doubles	
Bronze	Yan Xu	Table Tennis	Women's Singles	
Bronze	Hendri Kurniawan Saputra; Li Yujia	Badminton	Mixed doubles	

== Athletics ==
=== Field events ===
==== Women ====
Athlete	Event	Final	
Athlete	Event	Distance	Position
Du Xianhui	Shot put	16.76	5
Zhang Guirong	Shot put	17.39	4

== Badminton ==
=== Men ===
Athlete	Event	Round of 16	Quarter-finals	Semifinal	Final / BM	
Athlete	Event	Opposition Score	Opposition Score	Opposition Score	Opposition Score	Rank
Hendra Wijaya	Singles	John Moody (NZL); W (21–15, 21–9)	Chetan Anand (IND); L (16–21, 21–13, 11–21)	Did not advance		
Kendrick Lee	Singles	Dinuka Karunaratne (SRI); W (21–11, 21–4)	Wong Choong Hann (MAL); L (17–21, 20–22)	Did not advance		
Tan Wei Kiat Aaron	Singles	Aamir Ghaffar (ENG); L (11–21, 9–21)	Did not advance			
Hendri Kurniawan Saputra Ronald Susilo	Doubles	—	Koo Kien Keat / Chan Chong Ming (MAL); L (17–21, 17–21)	Did not advance		

=== Women ===
Athlete	Event	Round of 16	Quarter-finals	Semifinal	Final / BM	
Athlete	Event	Opposition Score	Opposition Score	Opposition Score	Opposition Score	Rank
Li Li	Singles	Aparna Popat (IND); L (21–10, 21–23, 17–21)	Did not advance			
Liu Fan Frances	Singles	Anna Rice (CAN); W (21–16, 21–19)	Susan Hughes (SCO); L (18–21, 19–21)	Did not advance		
Xing Aiying	Singles	Saina Nehwal (SRI); W (14–21, 21–13, 21–6)	Wong Mew Choo (MAL); L (10–21, 10–21)	Did not advance		
Jiang Yanmei; Li Yujia	Doubles	—	Nicole Gorden / Sara Petersen (NZL); W (21–13, 21–4)	Gail Emms / Donna Kellogg (ENG); W (21–8, 21–14)	Chin Eei Hui / Wong Pei Tty (MAL); L (17–21, 19–21)	2nd place, silver medalist(s)

=== Mixed ===
Athlete	Event	Quarter-finals	Semifinal	Final / BM	
Athlete	Event	Opposition Score	Opposition Score	Opposition Score	Rank
Hendri Kurniawan Saputra Li Yujia	Doubles	Travis Denney / Kate Wilson-Smith (AUS); W (23–21, 21–17)	Nathan Robertson / Gail Emms (ENG); L (21–19, 14–21, 17–21)	Koo Kien Keat / Wong Pei Tty (MAL); W (21–14, 21–23, 21–6)	3rd place, bronze medalist(s)

== Gymnastics ==
=== Artistic ===
==== Men ====
Ho was the first gymnast to qualify for the Commonwealth games and was the only gymnast representing Singapore.

Athlete	Event	Qualification		Final	
Athlete	Event	Score	Rank	Score	Rank
Ho Wah Toon	Vault	15.700		Did not advance	
Ho Wah Toon	Floor	12.150		Did not advance	

== Netball ==
Singapore qualified for the netball at the 2006 Commonwealth Games after winning the 2005 Asian Netball Championships. In their opening match they played Jamaica. They finished 12th in tournament. In the 11th/12th playoff, they lost 52–46 to Saint Vincent and the Grenadines.

Pool 2

Friday 17 March; 13:00 (UTC+11)	Stats	Jamaica	67–22	Singapore	Umpires: Sharon Kelly; Marion Johnson-Hurley; Reserve umpire: Amanda Nottingham
Friday 17 March; 13:00 (UTC+11)	Stats	Scoring by quarter: 19-7, 15-8, 18-5, 15-2			Umpires: Sharon Kelly; Marion Johnson-Hurley; Reserve umpire: Amanda Nottingham
Friday 17 March; 13:00 (UTC+11)	Stats	Elaine Davis 25/32 (78%); Latoya Thomas 23/26 (88%); Simone Forbes 11/14 (79%); Jodi Ann Ffrench 8/10 (80%)		Tan Hui Yan 10/14 (71%); Li Ling 7/10 (70%); Chen Hui Fen 3/5 (60%); Jeanine Heng Wei Ping 2/5 (40%)	Umpires: Sharon Kelly; Marion Johnson-Hurley; Reserve umpire: Amanda Nottingham

Saturday 18 March; 15:00 (UTC+11)	Stats	Singapore	33–76	Samoa	Umpires: Michelle Phippard; Carolene Logan; Reserve umpire: Jacqui Jashari
Saturday 18 March; 15:00 (UTC+11)	Stats	Scoring by quarter: 6-21, 10-18, 9-16, 8-21			Umpires: Michelle Phippard; Carolene Logan; Reserve umpire: Jacqui Jashari
Saturday 18 March; 15:00 (UTC+11)	Stats	Jeanine Heng Wei Ping 12/15 (80%); Li Ling 9/11 (82%); Tan Hui Yan 8/8 (100%); Pearline Chan 2/2 (100%); Chen Hui Fen 2/4 (50%)		Cathrine Latu 44/51 (86%); Monika Fuimaono 15/16 (94%); Malu Fa'asavalu 13/17 (76%); Ida Vaai 3/7 (43%); Monalisa Tofilau 1/1 (100%)	Umpires: Michelle Phippard; Carolene Logan; Reserve umpire: Jacqui Jashari

Monday 20 March; 20:30 (UTC+11)	Stats	Barbados	51–40	Singapore	Umpires: Bronwyn Meek; Michelle Phippard; Reserve umpire: Bill Alexander
Monday 20 March; 20:30 (UTC+11)	Stats	Scoring by quarter: 7-14, 15-9, 17-8, 12-9			Umpires: Bronwyn Meek; Michelle Phippard; Reserve umpire: Bill Alexander
Monday 20 March; 20:30 (UTC+11)	Stats	Laurel Browne 37/40 (93%); Lydia Bishop 14/20 (70%)		Tan Hui Yan 22/32 (69%); Li Ling 14/19 (74%); Jeanine Heng Wei Ping 4/7 (57%)	Umpires: Bronwyn Meek; Michelle Phippard; Reserve umpire: Bill Alexander

Tuesday 21 March; 20:30 (UTC+11)	Stats	Wales	45–36	Singapore	Umpires: Bill Alexander; Stacey Campton; Reserve umpire: Sharon Kelly
Tuesday 21 March; 20:30 (UTC+11)	Stats	Scoring by quarter: 11-8, 12-6, 13-8, 9-14			Umpires: Bill Alexander; Stacey Campton; Reserve umpire: Sharon Kelly
Tuesday 21 March; 20:30 (UTC+11)	Stats	Rhiannon Ace 22/30 (73%); Rebecca James 13/19 (68%); Jamilla Abbott 10/20 (50%); Nicola Lewis 0/1 (0%)		Tan Hui Yan 24/31 (77%); Jeanine Heng Wei Ping 11/13 (85%); Li Ling 1/7 (14%)	Umpires: Bill Alexander; Stacey Campton; Reserve umpire: Sharon Kelly

Thursday 23 March; 14:00 (UTC+11)	Report; Stats	Singapore	19–107	Australia	Umpires: Carolene Logan; Chris Campbell; Reserve umpire: Bronwyn Meek
Thursday 23 March; 14:00 (UTC+11)	Report; Stats	Scoring by quarter: 4-25, 4-28, 4-26, 7-28			Umpires: Carolene Logan; Chris Campbell; Reserve umpire: Bronwyn Meek
Thursday 23 March; 14:00 (UTC+11)	Report; Stats	Tan Hui Yan 9/18 (50%); Jeanine Heng Wei Ping 5/9 (56%); Li Ling 4/5 (80%); Chen Hui Fen 1/2 (50%); Tan Lee Hiang Wendy 0/1 (0%)		Catherine Cox 44/51 (86%); Megan Dehn 35/42 (83%); Sharelle McMahon 17/20 (85%); Susan Pratley 11/11 (100%)	Umpires: Carolene Logan; Chris Campbell; Reserve umpire: Bronwyn Meek

Table

Pos	Team	P	W	D	L	GF	GA	GD	Pts
1	Australia	5	4	1	0	387	169	+218	9
2	Jamaica	5	4	1	0	324	174	+150	9
3	Samoa	5	3	0	2	264	254	+10	6
4	Wales	5	2	0	3	185	271	-86	4
5	Barbados	5	2	0	3	183	279	-96	4
6	Singapore	5	0	0	5	150	346	-196	0

Qualified for Semi-finals
Qualified for Classification

11th/12th playoff

Friday 24 March; 13:00 (UTC+11)	Stats	Singapore	46–52	Saint Vincent and the Grenadines	Umpires: Chris Campbell; Marion Johnson-Hurley; Reserve umpire: Carolene Logan
Friday 24 March; 13:00 (UTC+11)	Stats	Scoring by quarter: 15-12, 10-10, 13-15, 8-15			Umpires: Chris Campbell; Marion Johnson-Hurley; Reserve umpire: Carolene Logan
Friday 24 March; 13:00 (UTC+11)	Stats	Tan Hui Yan 30/50 (60%); Jeanine Heng Wei Ping 9/15 (60%); Li Ling 7/9 (78%)		Galeine Gordon 27/32 (84%); Samathea Christopher 22/23 (96%); Nicole Sandy 3/4 (75%)	Umpires: Chris Campbell; Marion Johnson-Hurley; Reserve umpire: Carolene Logan

Squad

Singapore roster
Players
Coaches

Name	Pos	DOB	Height	Club	Nat	Caps
Pearline Chan (c)	C, WA	21 August 1979 (aged 26)	1.67 m (5 ft 6 in)	Nike
Chen Hui Fen	GA, GS	11 March 1985 (aged 21)	1.69 m (5 ft 7 in)	Blaze
Jeanine Heng	GS, GA	20 January 1979 (aged 27)	1.78 m (5 ft 10 in)	Sneakers
Premila Hirubalan	GD, GK	17 August 1982 (aged 23)	1.70 m (5 ft 7 in)	Nike
Vanessa Lee		24 November 1983 (aged 22)	–
Li Ling	GS, GA	26 December 1987 (aged 18)	1.88 m (6 ft 2 in)	Blaze
Lin Qingyi	GK, GD	24 June 1985 (aged 20)	1.73 m (5 ft 8 in)	Blaze
Puay Loo	C	(aged 27)	1.64 m (5 ft 5 in)
Jean Ng	GD, GK	21 March 1978 (aged 27)	1.75 m (5 ft 9 in)	Nike
Grace Sim	WD, C	6 November 1985 (aged 20)	1.69 m (5 ft 7 in)	Nike
Tan Hui Yan	GA, GS	16 November 1982 (aged 23)	1.69 m (5 ft 7 in)	Blaze
Wendy Tan	WA	24 November 1978 (aged 27)	1.64 m (5 ft 5 in)	Nike
Zhang Ting Jun	WD, GD	27 August 1982 (aged 23)	1.77 m (5 ft 10 in)	Sneakers

Head coach

- Kate Carpenter

Assistant coach

- Yeo Mee Hong

Manager: Vicki Woo

Notes

- (c) – Captain
- (cc) – Co-captain
- (vc) – Vice-captain
- – Injury / maternity leave
- (TRP) – Temporary Replacement Player

== Shooting ==
=== Men ===
Athlete	Event	Qualification		Final	
Athlete	Event	Points	Rank	Points	Rank
Choo Choon Seng	Trap	—		107	24
Lee Wung Yew	Trap	—		114	13
Choo Choon Seng; Lee Wung Yew	Trap Pairs	—		182	5
On Shaw Ming	25m Centre Fire Pistol	—		578	1st place, gold medalist(s)
Ong Jun Hong	10m Air Rifle	587	7	100.8	6
Zhang Jin	10m Air Rifle	595	2	101.9	2nd place, silver medalist(s)
Ong Jun Hong; Zhang Jin	10m Air Rifle Pairs	—		1177	3rd place, bronze medalist(s)
Poh Lip Meng	10m Air Pistol	—		568	11
Soo Kwok Seng	10m Air Pistol	—		560	20
Poh Lip Meng; Soo Kwok Seng	10m Air Pistol Pairs	—		1141	4

=== Women ===
Athlete	Event	Qualification		Final	
Athlete	Event	Points	Rank	Points	Rank
Lim Chea Rong	50m Rifle Prone	—		576	13
Lim Chea Rong	50m Rifle 3 Position	—		552	21
Vanessa Yu Zhen Yong	10m Air Rifle	397	3	102.9	3rd place, bronze medalist(s)
Zhang Jingna	10m Air Rifle	391	9	Did not advance	
Zhao Huijing	10m Air Pistol	376	6	93.5	6
Lim Chea Rong; Zhang Jingna	50m Rifle 3 Position	—		182	5
Vanessa Yu Zhen Yong; Zhang Jingna	10m Air Rifle Pairs	—		781	3rd place, bronze medalist(s)

== Swimming ==
=== Men ===
Athlete	Event	Heat		Semifinal		Final	
Athlete	Event	Time	Rank	Time	Rank	Time	Rank
Chen Hai Leow	50 metre EAD freestyle	31.72	13	Did not advance			
Chen Hai Leow	100 metre EAD freestyle	1:11.80	13	Did not advance			
Lim Keng Joo	50 metre EAD freestyle	32.14	16	Did not advance			
Lim Keng Joo	100 metre EAD freestyle	1:11.39	12	Did not advance			
Lieu Teck Hua	50 metre EAD freestyle	38.53	20	Did not advance			
Lieu Teck Hua	100 metre EAD freestyle	1:17.03	16	Did not advance			
Tay Zhirong	50 metre freestyle	24.29	18	Did not advance			
Tay Zhirong	100 metre freestyle	52.40	18 Q	52.15	15	Did not advance	
Tay Zhirong	200 metre freestyle	1:55.84	19	Did not advance			
Su Shirong	50 metre freestyle	24.35	21	Did not advance			
Su Shirong	100 metre freestyle	52.96	21	Did not advance			
Su Shirong	50 metre butterfly	26.12	23	Did not advance			
Su Shirong	100 metre butterfly	56.80	18	Did not advance			
Su Shirong	200 metre butterfly	2:12.55	15	Did not advance			
Cheah Mingzhe	200 metre freestyle	1:57.70	22	Did not advance			
Cheah Mingzhe	400 metre freestyle	4:09.68	13	Did not advance			
Cheah Mingzhe	1500 metre freestyle	16:28.87	8 Q	—		16:18.34	8
Tan Lee Yu	100 metre backstroke	59.15	15 Q	59.38	14	Did not advance	
Tan Jin Wen	50 metre breaststroke	30.47	17	Did not advance			
Tan Jin Wen	100 metre breaststroke	1:07.14	21	Did not advance			
Tan Jin Wen	200 metre breaststroke	2:27.53	10	Did not advance			
Ng Cheng Xun	50 metre butterfly	26.06	22	Did not advance			
Ng Cheng Xun	100 metre butterfly	57.03	19	Did not advance			
Ng Cheng Xun	200 metre butterfly	2:08.29	13	Did not advance			
Tay Zhirong; Tan Lee Yu; Su Shirong; Cheah Mingzhe	4 × 100 metre freestyle relay	—				3:31.19	6
Tay Zhirong; Tan Lee Yu; Su Shirong; Cheah Mingzhe	200 metre freestyle relay	—				DSQ	
Tan Lee Yu; Tan Jin Wen; Su Shirong; Tay Zhirong	100 metre medley relay	3:57.26	7 Q	—		3:56.08	7

=== Women ===
Athlete	Event	Heat		Semifinal		Final	
Athlete	Event	Time	Rank	Time	Rank	Time	Rank
Goh Rui Si Theresa	50 metre EAD freestyle	45.29	10	Did not advance			
Goh Rui Si Theresa	100 metre EAD freestyle	1:36.40	9	Did not advance			
Ho Ruyu Ruth	50 metre freestyle	27.51	20	Did not advance			
Ho Ruyu Ruth	100 metre freestyle	1:00.00	23	Did not advance			
Ho Shu Yong	50 metre freestyle	27.45	17	Did not advance			
Ho Shu Yong	100 metre freestyle	59.78	19	Did not advance			
Ho Shu Yong	200 metre freestyle	2:12.50	25	Did not advance			
Joscelin Yeo	50 metre freestyle	DNS		Did not advance			
Joscelin Yeo	50 metre butterfly	DNS		Did not advance			
Joscelin Yeo	100 metre butterfly	DNS		Did not advance			
Joscelin Yeo	200 metre individual medley	DNS		Did not advance			
Ong Chui Bin Mylene	100 metre freestyle	59.92	20	Did not advance			
Ong Chui Bin Mylene	200 metre freestyle	2:11.63	23	Did not advance			
Ong Chui Bin Mylene	400 metre freestyle	4:42.86	15	Did not advance			
Quah Ting Wen	200 metre freestyle	2:09.10	20	Did not advance			
Quah Ting Wen	400 metre freestyle	4:28.91	14	Did not advance			
Quah Ting Wen	800 metre freestyle	9:07.93	10	Did not advance			
Quah Ting Wen	400 metre individual medley	5:04.52	11	Did not advance			
Ng Hiang Yuet Lynette	50 metre backstroke	30.55	8 Q	30.62	9	Did not advance	
Ng Hiang Yuet Lynette	100 metre backstroke	1:06.08	13 Q	1:06.47	14	Did not advance	
Tao Li	50 metre backstroke	DNS		Did not advance			
Tao Li	50 metre butterfly	27.70	10 Q	27.25	6 Q	27.06	5
Tao Li	100 metre butterfly	1:01.35	11 Q	1:00.15	6 Q	1:00.63	8
Tao Li	200 metre butterfly	2:15.49	7 Q	—		2:15.85	7
Ng Hiang Yuet Lynette; Joscelin Yeo; Ho Shu Yong; Ong Chui Bin Mylene	4 × 100 metre freestyle relay	—				3:54.15	6
Ho Shu Yong; Ng Hiang Yuet Lynette; Quah Ting Wen; Ong Chui Bin Mylene	4 × 200 metre freestyle relay	—				8:41.28	7
Ng Hiang Yuet Lynette; Joscelin Yeo; Tao Li; Ong Chui Bin Mylene	4 × 100 metre freestyle relay	—				4:17.30	7

== Table Tennis ==
=== Singles ===
Athlete	Event	Preliminary round		Round of 64	Round of 32	Round of 16	Quarterfinals	Semifinals	GM / BM	
Athlete	Event	Opposition Result	Opposition Result	Opposition Result	Opposition Result	Opposition Result	Opposition Result	Opposition Result	Opposition Result	Rank
Cai Xiaoli	Men	Bye			Pierre-Luc Hinse (CAN); W 4–1	Peter Jackson (NZL); W 4–1	Sharath Kamal (IND); L 2–4	Did not advance		
Jason Ho	Men	Rikesh Padarath (FIJ); W 4–0	Matthew Kahn (GUY); W 4–0	Chan Koon Wah (MAS); W 4–1	Soumyadeep Roy (IND); W 4–3	Adam Robertson (WAL); L 4–0	Did not advance			
Clarence Lee	Men	Tokannata Ioatene (KIR); W 4–0	Trevor Farley (BAR); L 1–4	Did not advance						
Lee Han Ting	Men	Shahid Ismail (MDV); W 4–1	David Zalcberg (AUS); L 0–4	Did not advance						
Yang Zi	Men	Bye			Paul Drinkhall (ENG); W 4–2	Subhajit Saha (IND); W 4–1	William Henzell (AUS); L 0–4	Did not advance		
Li Jiawei	Women	Bye		—	Bye	Joanna Parker (ENG); W 4–0	Zhang Mo (CAN); W 4–0	Yan Xu (SIN); W 4–1	Zhang Xueling (SIN); L 3–4	2nd place, silver medalist(s)
Zena Sim	Women	Offiong Edem (NGR); L 1–4	Shirley Yan (CAN); L 1–4	—	Did not advance					
Tan Paey Fern	Women	Bye		—	Bye	Chiu Soo Jin (MAL); W 4–1	Miao Miao (AUS); L 2–4	Did not advance		
Yan Xu	Women	Bye		—	Bye	Mouma Das (IND); W 4–0	Stephanie Sang (AUS); W 4–0	Li Jiawei (SIN); L 1–4	Miao Miao (AUS); W 4–0	3rd place, bronze medalist(s)
Zhang Xueling	Women	Bye		—	Bye	Ng Sock Khim (MAS); W 4–1	Li Jin Karen (NZL); W 4–1	Miao Miao (AUS); W 4–0	Li Jiawei (SIN); W 4–3	1st place, gold medalist(s)

=== Doubles ===
Athlete	Event	Quarterfinals	Semifinals	GM / BM	
Athlete	Event	Opposition Result	Opposition Result	Opposition Result	Rank
Cai Xiaoli; Yang Zi	Men	Bence Csaba / Faazil Kassam (CAN); W 3–0	Andrew Baggaley / Andrew Rushton (ENG); L 2–3	Did not advance	
Li Jiawei; Zhang Xueling	Women	Joanna Parker / Kelly Sibley (ENG); W 3–1	Li Jin Karen / Annie Yang (NZL); W 3–0	Tan Paey Fern / Yan Xu (SGP); W 3–0	1st place, gold medalist(s)
Tan Paey Fern; Yan Xu	Women	Ng Sock Khim / Beh Lee Wei (MAS); W 3–0	Miao Miao / Jian Fang Lay (AUS); W 3–2	Li Jiawei / Zhang Xueling (SGP); L 0–3	2nd place, silver medalist(s)
Yang Zi; Zhang Xueling	Mixed	Ng Sock Khim / Chan Koon Wah (MAS); W 3–0	Jason Ho / Tan Paey Fern (SIN); W 3–0	Cai Xiaoli / Li Jiawei (SIN); W 3–1	1st place, gold medalist(s)
Cai Xiaoli; Li Jiawei	Mixed	Soumyadeep Roy / Mouma Das (IND); W 3–0	Russ Lavale / Miao Miao (AUS); W 3–1	Yang Zi / Zhang Xueling (SIN); L 1–3	2nd place, silver medalist(s)
Jason Ho; Tan Paey Fern	Mixed	Ng Sock Khim / Chan Koon Wah (MAS); W 3–0	Yang Zi / Zhang Xueling (SIN); L 0–3	Russ Lavale / Miao Miao (AUS); W 3–2	3rd place, bronze medalist(s)

=== Team ===
Athletes	Event	Preliminary round							Quarterfinal	Semifinal	GM / BM	Rank
Athletes	Event	Opposition Score	Opposition Score	Opposition Score	Opposition Score	Opposition Score	Opposition Score	Rank	Opposition Score	Opposition Score	Opposition Score	Rank
Cai Xiaoli; Jason Ho; Clarence Lee; Lee Han Ting; Yang Zi	Men's Team	Fiji; W 3–0	Trinidad and Tobago; W 3–0	Malawi; W 3–0	Barbados; W 3–0	Canada; W 3–0	Jamaica; W 3–0	1 Q	Seychelles; W 3–2	Wales; W 3–0	India; L 2–3	2nd place, silver medalist(s)
Li Jiawei; Zena Sim; Tan Paey Fern; Yan Xu; Zhang Xueling	Women's Team	New Zealand; W 3–0	Canada; W 3–0	Uganda; W 3–0	—			1 Q	Wales; W 3–0	India; W 3–0	Wales; W 3–0	1st place, gold medalist(s)
