= Swimming at the 2006 Commonwealth Games – Men's 100 metre freestyle =

== Men's 100 m Freestyle - Final ==
| Pos. | Lane | Athlete | R.T. | 50 m | 100 m | Tbh. |
|---|---|---|---|---|---|---|
| | 4 | Simon Burnett (ENG) | 0.72 | 23.53; 23.53 | 48.57 (GR); 25.04 | |
| | 6 | Ryk Neethling (RSA) | 0.76 | 23.28; 23.28 | 49.20; 25.92 | 0.63 |
| | 5 | Roland Schoeman (RSA) | 0.72 | 23.21; 23.21 | 49.24; 26.03 | 0.67 |
| 4 | 2 | Brent Hayden (CAN) | 0.76 | 23.53; 23.53 | 49.38; 25.85 | 0.81 |
| 5 | 3 | Eamon Sullivan (AUS) | 0.72 | 23.71; 23.71 | 49.58; 25.87 | 1.01 |
| 6 | 1 | Ashley Callus (AUS) | 0.67 | 23.79; 23.79 | 49.78; 25.99 | 1.21 |
| 7 | 7 | Kenrick Monk (AUS) | 0.69 | 24.25; 24.25 | 49.94; 25.69 | 1.37 |
| 8 | 8 | Yannick Lupien (CAN) | 0.78 | 24.51; 24.51 | 51.07; 26.56 | 2.50 |

== Men's 100 m Freestyle - Semifinals ==
=== Men's 100 m Freestyle - Semifinal 01 ===
| Pos. | Lane | Athlete | R.T. | 50 m | 100 m | Tbh. |
|---|---|---|---|---|---|---|
| 1 | 3 | Simon Burnett (ENG) | 0.70 | 23.75; 23.75 | 49.19; 25.44 | |
| 2 | 4 | Brent Hayden (CAN) | 0.75 | 24.06; 24.06 | 49.92; 25.86 | 0.73 |
| 3 | 5 | Yannick Lupien (CAN) | 0.80 | 24.38; 24.38 | 50.18; 25.80 | 0.99 |
| 4 | 2 | Craig Houston (SCO) | 0.76 | 24.55; 24.55 | 50.63; 26.08 | 1.44 |
| 5 | 6 | Christopher Cozens (ENG) | 0.71 | 24.60; 24.60 | 50.72; 26.12 | 1.53 |
| 6 | 1 | Anthony Howard (ENG) | 0.77 | 24.60; 24.60 | 51.23; 26.63 | 2.04 |
| 7 | 7 | Carl Probert (FIJ) | 0.73 | 24.79; 24.79 | 51.57; 26.78 | 2.38 |
| 8 | 8 | Zhirong Tay (SIN) | 0.67 | 25.67; 25.67 | 52.15; 26.48 | 2.96 |

=== Men's 100 m Freestyle - Semifinal 02 ===
| Pos. | Lane | Athlete | R.T. | 50 m | 100 m | Tbh. |
|---|---|---|---|---|---|---|
| 1 | 2 | Roland Schoeman (RSA) | 0.67 | 23.23; 23.23 | 49.34; 26.11 | |
| 2 | 4 | Eamon Sullivan (AUS) | 0.71 | 23.86; 23.86 | 49.37; 25.51 | 0.03 |
| 3 | 3 | Ryk Neethling (RSA) | 0.75 | 23.62; 23.62 | 49.43; 25.81 | 0.09 |
| 4 | 5 | Kenrick Monk (AUS) | 0.70 | 24.24; 24.24 | 49.92; 25.68 | 0.58 |
| 5 | 6 | Ashley Callus (AUS) | 0.71 | 23.94; 23.94 | 50.02; 26.08 | 0.68 |
| 6 | 1 | Darian Townsend (RSA) | 0.69 | 24.08; 24.08 | 50.82; 26.74 | 1.48 |
| 7 | 7 | Bill Lumbergh (CAY) | 0.75 | 24.50; 24.50 | 50.94; 26.44 | 1.60 |
| 8 | 8 | Chrysanthos Papachrysanthou (CYP) | 0.80 | 25.24; 25.24 | 53.08; 27.84 | 3.74 |

== Men's 100 m Freestyle - Heats ==
=== Men's 100 m Freestyle - Heat 01 ===
| Pos. | Lane | Athlete | R.T. | 50 m | 100 m | Tbh. |
|---|---|---|---|---|---|---|
| 1 | 4 | Daniel Bego (MAS) | 0.68 | 25.66; 25.66 | 52.45; 26.79 | |
| 2 | 5 | Earlando Mc Rae (GUY) | 0.61 | 27.02; 27.02 | 56.91; 29.89 | 4.46 |
| DNS | 3 | Kyle Tingler (SHE) | | | | |

=== Men's 100 m Freestyle - Heat 02 ===
| Pos. | Lane | Athlete | R.T. | 50 m | 100 m | Tbh. |
|---|---|---|---|---|---|---|
| 1 | 4 | Ian Hubert (GUE) | 0.76 | 26.36; 26.36 | 54.40; 28.04 | |
| 2 | 5 | Ben Lowndes (GUE) | 0.80 | 26.04; 26.04 | 54.84; 28.80 | 0.44 |
| 3 | 6 | Luke Hall (SWZ) | 0.73 | 26.95; 26.95 | 55.65; 28.70 | 1.25 |
| 4 | 2 | Stefan Lee (SRI) | 0.87 | 27.24; 27.24 | 55.75; 28.51 | 1.35 |
| 5 | 3 | Adrian Nanty (SEY) | 0.81 | 26.73; 26.73 | 56.67; 29.94 | 2.27 |
| 6 | 7 | Joseph Arsacularatne (SRI) | 0.84 | 28.16; 28.16 | 59.56; 31.40 | 5.16 |
| 7 | 8 | Mohamed Sharif (MDV) | 0.96 | 30.73; 30.73 | 1:07.31; 36.58 | 12.91 |
| 8 | 1 | Hassan Ashraf (MDV) | 0.74 | 29.77; 29.77 | 1:07.62; 37.85 | 13.22 |

=== Men's 100 m Freestyle - Heat 03 ===
| Pos. | Lane | Athlete | R.T. | 50 m | 100 m | Tbh. |
|---|---|---|---|---|---|---|
| 1 | 3 | Liam Du Feu (JER) | 0.64 | 26.29; 26.29 | 54.02; 27.73 | |
| 2 | 8 | Jeremy Osborne (GUE) | 0.85 | 26.77; 26.77 | 54.55; 27.78 | 0.53 |
| 3 | 5 | Leonel Matonse (MOZ) | 0.68 | 26.38; 26.38 | 55.31; 28.93 | 1.29 |
| 4 | 7 | Alexander Ray (NAM) | 0.64 | 27.28; 27.28 | 55.73; 28.45 | 1.71 |
| 5 | 4 | Chris Hackel (MRI) | 0.81 | 26.91; 26.91 | 55.83; 28.92 | 1.81 |
| 6 | 1 | Ramadhan Vyombo (KEN) | 0.76 | 26.68; 26.68 | 56.43; 29.75 | 2.41 |
| 7 | 2 | Arun Karunaratne (SRI) | 0.77 | 26.72; 26.72 | 56.62; 29.90 | 2.60 |
| 8 | 6 | Monirul Kazi (BAN) | 0.92 | 27.16; 27.16 | 58.55; 31.39 | 4.53 |

=== Men's 100 m Freestyle - Heat 04 ===
| Pos. | Lane | Athlete | R.T. | 50 m | 100 m | Tbh. |
|---|---|---|---|---|---|---|
| 1 | 4 | Simon Burnett (ENG) | 0.73 | 24.57; 24.57 | 50.42; 25.85 | |
| 2 | 5 | Ashley Callus (AUS) | 0.70 | 24.36; 24.36 | 50.44; 26.08 | 0.02 |
| 3 | 2 | Shaune Fraser (CAY) | 0.77 | 24.93; 24.93 | 51.48; 26.55 | 1.06 |
| 4 | 6 | Darian Townsend (RSA) | 0.71 | 24.86; 24.86 | 51.67; 26.81 | 1.25 |
| 5 | 3 | Anthony Howard (ENG) | 0.82 | 25.04; 25.04 | 51.71; 26.67 | 1.29 |
| 6 | 7 | Zhirong Tay (SIN) | 0.63 | 25.68; 25.68 | 52.40; 26.72 | 1.98 |
| 7 | 8 | Alexis Militis (JER) | 0.81 | 25.70; 25.70 | 52.94; 27.24 | 2.52 |
| 8 | 1 | Shirong Su (SIN) | 0.71 | 25.67; 25.67 | 52.96; 27.29 | 2.54 |

=== Men's 100 m Freestyle - Heat 05 ===
| Pos. | Lane | Athlete | R.T. | 50 m | 100 m | Tbh. |
|---|---|---|---|---|---|---|
| 1 | 5 | Brent Hayden (CAN) | 0.75 | 24.09; 24.09 | 49.98; 25.89 | |
| 2 | 4 | Ryk Neethling (RSA) | 0.73 | 24.05; 24.05 | 50.19; 26.14 | 0.21 |
| 3 | 6 | Matthew Rose (CAN) | 0.72 | 24.13; 24.13 | 50.20; 26.07 | 0.22 |
| 4 | 3 | Christopher Cozens (ENG) | 0.73 | 24.46; 24.46 | 50.73; 26.27 | 0.75 |
| 5 | 2 | Craig Houston (SCO) | 0.80 | 25.01; 25.01 | 51.11; 26.10 | 1.13 |
| 6 | 7 | Carl Probert (FIJ) | 0.75 | 24.72; 24.72 | 51.64; 26.92 | 1.66 |
| 7 | 1 | Ronald Cowen (BER) | 0.80 | 25.29; 25.29 | 53.29; 28.00 | 3.31 |
| 8 | 8 | Graham Smith (BER) | 0.67 | 25.55; 25.55 | 54.49; 28.94 | 4.51 |

=== Men's 100 m Freestyle - Heat 06 ===
| Pos. | Lane | Athlete | R.T. | 50 m | 100 m | Tbh. |
|---|---|---|---|---|---|---|
| 1 | 5 | Eamon Sullivan (AUS) | 0.70 | 24.06; 24.06 | 49.94; 25.88 | |
| 2 | 6 | Kenrick Monk (AUS) | 0.71 | 24.36; 24.36 | 50.12; 25.76 | 0.18 |
| 3 | 3 | Yannick Lupien (CAN) | 0.78 | 24.24; 24.24 | 50.15; 25.91 | 0.21 |
| 4 | 2 | Ryan Pini (PNG) | 0.78 | 24.66; 24.66 | 50.60; 25.94 | 0.66 |
| 5 | 4 | Roland Schoeman (RSA) | 0.67 | 24.01; 24.01 | 50.78; 26.77 | 0.84 |
| 6 | 7 | Chrysanthos Papachrysanthou (CYP) | 0.79 | 24.91; 24.91 | 52.36; 27.45 | 2.42 |
| 7 | 1 | Brad Hamilton (JAM) | 0.70 | 25.34; 25.34 | 53.05; 27.71 | 3.11 |
| DNS | 8 | David Dunford (KEN) | | | | |
