= Swimming at the 2006 Commonwealth Games – Women's 400 metre freestyle =

== Women's 400 m Freestyle - Final ==
Pos.	Lane	Athlete	R.T.	50 m	100 m	150 m	200 m	250 m	300 m	350 m	400 m	Tbh.
	5	Caitlin McClatchey (SCO)	0.70	28.74; 28.74	59.63; 30.89	1:31.19; 31.56	2:03.10; 31.91	2:34.82; 31.72	3:06.60; 31.78	3:37.84; 31.24	4:07.69; 29.85	
	4	Joanne Jackson (ENG)	0.73	28.86; 28.86	59.69; 30.83	1:31.19; 31.50	2:02.90; 31.71	2:34.59; 31.69	3:06.46; 31.87	3:37.86; 31.40	4:08.36; 30.50	0.67
	3	Bronte Barratt (AUS)	0.72	28.62; 28.62	59.81; 31.19	1:31.35; 31.54	2:03.15; 31.80	2:34.56; 31.41	3:06.42; 31.86	3:38.07; 31.65	4:08.65; 30.58	0.96
4	7	Linda Mackenzie (AUS)	0.78	28.90; 28.90	1:00.48; 31.58	1:32.33; 31.85	2:04.49; 32.16	2:36.32; 31.83	3:08.54; 32.22	3:40.01; 31.47	4:09.81; 29.80	2.12
5	6	Kylie Palmer (AUS)	0.74	28.66; 28.66	1:00.16; 31.50	1:32.00; 31.84	2:04.30; 32.30	2:36.12; 31.82	3:08.25; 32.13	3:40.33; 32.08	4:11.74; 31.41	4.05
6	1	Brittany Reimer (CAN)	0.88	29.83; 29.83	1:01.78; 31.95	1:33.72; 31.94	2:06.22; 32.50	2:38.49; 32.27	3:11.04; 32.55	3:43.19; 32.15	4:14.60; 31.41	6.91
7	2	Rebecca Cooke (ENG)	0.83	29.75; 29.75	1:01.45; 31.70	1:33.73; 32.28	2:06.19; 32.46	2:38.55; 32.36	3:11.17; 32.62	3:43.76; 32.59	4:15.61; 31.85	7.92
8	8	Maya Beaudry (CAN)	0.86	30.81; 30.81	1:03.46; 32.65	1:36.25; 32.79	2:09.30; 33.05	2:42.04; 32.74	3:15.02; 32.98	3:47.53; 32.51	4:19.44; 31.91	11.75

== Women's 400 m Freestyle - Heats ==
=== Women's 400 m Freestyle - Heat 01 ===
Pos.	Lane	Athlete	R.T.	50 m	100 m	150 m	200 m	250 m	300 m	350 m	400 m	Tbh.
1	4	Joanne Jackson (ENG)	0.74	29.40; 29.40	1:01.27; 31.87	1:32.71; 31.44	2:04.63; 31.92	2:36.70; 32.07	3:08.79; 32.09	3:40.79; 32.00	4:11.77; 30.98	
2	5	Kylie Palmer (AUS)	0.75	28.92; 28.92	1:00.42; 31.50	1:32.28; 31.86	2:04.48; 32.20	2:36.63; 32.15	3:09.05; 32.42	3:41.14; 32.09	4:12.51; 31.37	0.74
3	3	Jazmin Carlin (WAL)	0.75	30.09; 30.09	1:02.80; 32.71	1:35.62; 32.82	2:09.16; 33.54	2:41.97; 32.81	3:15.47; 33.50	3:49.06; 33.59	4:22.01; 32.95	10.24
4	6	Katheryn Meaklim (RSA)	0.78	29.85; 29.85	1:02.13; 32.28	1:35.19; 33.06	2:09.38; 34.19	2:43.40; 34.02	3:17.95; 34.55	3:52.36; 34.41	4:26.86; 34.50	15.09
5	2	Migali Gunatilake (SRI)	0.81	34.39; 34.39	1:13.12; 38.73	1:51.66; 38.54	2:31.37; 39.71	3:10.91; 39.54	3:50.92; 40.01	4:30.41; 39.49	5:07.52; 37.11	55.75

=== Women's 400 m Freestyle - Heat 02 ===
Pos.	Lane	Athlete	R.T.	50 m	100 m	150 m	200 m	250 m	300 m	350 m	400 m	Tbh.
1	5	Rebecca Cooke (ENG)	0.85	29.54; 29.54	1:01.11; 31.57	1:33.37; 32.26	2:05.66; 32.29	2:37.84; 32.18	3:09.78; 31.94	3:41.86; 32.08	4:13.13; 31.27	
2	4	Linda Mackenzie (AUS)	0.78	29.10; 29.10	1:00.86; 31.76	1:33.19; 32.33	2:05.66; 32.47	2:37.95; 32.29	3:10.36; 32.41	3:42.58; 32.22	4:13.97; 31.39	0.84
3	6	Maya Beaudry (CAN)	0.86	30.53; 30.53	1:02.78; 32.25	1:35.24; 32.46	2:07.97; 32.73	2:40.49; 32.52	3:13.61; 33.12	3:46.82; 33.21	4:19.39; 32.57	6.26
4	2	Shrone Austin (SEY)	0.86	30.81; 30.81	1:04.20; 33.39	1:37.93; 33.73	2:11.62; 33.69	2:45.84; 34.22	3:20.13; 34.29	3:54.69; 34.56	4:27.00; 32.31	13.87
5	7	Ming Xiu Ong (MAS)	0.73	30.91; 30.91	1:04.46; 33.55	1:37.88; 33.42	2:11.62; 33.74	2:45.36; 33.74	3:19.54; 34.18	3:53.93; 34.39	4:27.20; 33.27	14.07
DNS	3	Lauren Boyle (NZL)										

=== Women's 400 m Freestyle - Heat 03 ===
Pos.	Lane	Athlete	R.T.	50 m	100 m	150 m	200 m	250 m	300 m	350 m	400 m	Tbh.
1	4	Caitlin McClatchey (SCO)	0.72	29.23; 29.23	1:00.73; 31.50	1:32.54; 31.81	2:04.45; 31.91	2:36.52; 32.07	3:08.85; 32.33	3:41.04; 32.19	4:12.35; 31.31	
2	5	Bronte Barratt (AUS)	0.76	29.32; 29.32	1:00.79; 31.47	1:32.76; 31.97	2:04.71; 31.95	2:36.75; 32.04	3:09.08; 32.33	3:41.24; 32.16	4:12.46; 31.22	0.11
3	3	Brittany Reimer (CAN)	0.88	29.74; 29.74	1:01.84; 32.10	1:34.18; 32.34	2:07.05; 32.87	2:39.73; 32.68	3:12.82; 33.09	3:45.56; 32.74	4:17.70; 32.14	5.35
4	6	Wendy Trott (RSA)	0.81	29.92; 29.92	1:02.98; 33.06	1:35.85; 32.87	2:09.25; 33.40	2:42.03; 32.78	3:15.39; 33.36	3:48.58; 33.19	4:20.08; 31.50	7.73
5	2	Ting Wen Quah (SIN)	0.74	29.96; 29.96	1:03.49; 33.53	1:37.65; 34.16	2:11.74; 34.09	2:46.20; 34.46	3:21.18; 34.98	3:55.81; 34.63	4:28.91; 33.10	16.56
6	7	Mylene Ong (SIN)	0.69	31.29; 31.29	1:06.16; 34.87	1:42.19; 36.03	2:18.65; 36.46	2:54.77; 36.12	3:31.62; 36.85	4:07.77; 36.15	4:42.86; 35.09	30.51
