= Swimming at the 2006 Commonwealth Games – Men's 200 metre butterfly =

== Men's 200 m Butterfly - Final ==
Pos.	Lane	Athlete	R.T.	50 m	100 m	150 m	200 m	Tbh.
	5	Moss Burmester (NZL)	0.79	25.92; 25.92	56.02; 30.10	1:26.12; 30.10	1:56.64 (GR); 30.52	
	4	Travis Nederpelt (AUS)	0.83	26.74; 26.74	56.94; 30.20	1:27.16; 30.22	1:57.26; 30.10	0.62
	6	Joshua Krogh (AUS)	0.79	26.60; 26.60	56.78; 30.18	1:27.59; 30.81	1:59.18; 31.59	2.54
4	3	Jeremy Knowles (BAH)	0.73	26.65; 26.65	56.73; 30.08	1:27.40; 30.67	1:59.37; 31.97	2.73
5	2	Andrew McMillan (NZL)	0.75	27.04; 27.04	57.50; 30.46	1:28.56; 31.06	2:00.61; 32.05	3.97
6	8	Matthew Bowe (ENG)	0.94	27.19; 27.19	57.99; 30.80	1:29.82; 31.83	2:00.62; 30.80	3.98
7	7	Andrew Richards (AUS)	0.61	26.24; 26.24	56.68; 30.44	1:28.81; 32.13	2:01.64; 32.83	5.00
8	1	Ian Powell (GUE)	0.73	27.64; 27.64	58.87; 31.23	1:29.95; 31.08	2:02.11; 32.16	5.47

== Men's 200 m Butterfly - Heats ==
=== Men's 200 m Butterfly - Heat 01 ===
Pos.	Lane	Athlete	R.T.	50 m	100 m	150 m	200 m	Tbh.
1	5	Jeremy Knowles (BAH)	0.73	27.01; 27.01	57.14; 30.13	1:28.23; 31.09	2:00.17; 31.94	
2	4	Joshua Krogh (AUS)	0.73	26.67; 26.67	57.05; 30.38	1:28.31; 31.26	2:00.53; 32.22	0.36
3	3	Ian Powell (GUE)	0.71	27.53; 27.53	58.58; 31.05	1:29.78; 31.20	2:02.26; 32.48	2.09
4	6	Rehan Poncha (IND)	0.99	28.54; 28.54	1:00.33; 31.79	1:33.70; 33.37	2:08.72; 35.02	8.55
5	2	Shirong Su (SIN)	0.79	28.65; 28.65	1:01.92; 33.27	1:36.67; 34.75	2:12.55; 35.88	12.38

=== Men's 200 m Butterfly - Heat 02 ===
Pos.	Lane	Athlete	R.T.	50 m	100 m	150 m	200 m	Tbh.
1	4	Moss Burmester (NZL)	0.77	26.22; 26.22	56.50; 30.28	1:27.64; 31.14	1:59.87; 32.23	
2	5	Matthew Bowe (ENG)	0.92	26.37; 26.37	56.64; 30.27	1:28.27; 31.63	2:02.34; 34.07	2.47
3	3	Shaune Fraser (CAY)	0.74	27.30; 27.30	58.10; 30.80	1:29.60; 31.50	2:02.81; 33.21	2.94
4	2	Thomas Hollingsworth (GUE)	0.86	28.13; 28.13	1:00.09; 31.96	1:33.35; 33.26	2:06.89; 33.54	7.02
5	6	Cheng Xun Ng (SIN)	0.61	28.26; 28.26	1:00.74; 32.48	1:33.94; 33.20	2:08.29; 34.35	8.42
6	7	Bertrand Bristol (SEY)	0.70	28.28; 28.28	1:00.84; 32.56	1:35.54; 34.70	2:12.86; 37.32	12.99

=== Men's 200 m Butterfly - Heat 03 ===
Pos.	Lane	Athlete	R.T.	50 m	100 m	150 m	200 m	Tbh.
1	4	Travis Nederpelt (AUS)	0.81	26.65; 26.65	56.48; 29.83	1:26.70; 30.22	1:57.36; 30.66	
2	3	Andrew McMillan (NZL)	0.76	27.03; 27.03	57.65; 30.62	1:29.07; 31.42	2:00.70; 31.63	3.34
3	5	Andrew Richards (AUS)	0.65	26.50; 26.50	57.21; 30.71	1:28.76; 31.55	2:00.79; 32.03	3.43
4	2	Simon Le Couilliard (JER)	0.79	26.96; 26.96	58.58; 31.62	1:31.08; 32.50	2:04.49; 33.41	7.13
5	6	Arjun Muralidharan (IND)	0.92	27.45; 27.45	58.61; 31.16	1:31.41; 32.80	2:06.58; 35.17	9.22
6	7	Ben Lowndes (GUE)	0.82	27.97; 27.97	1:00.27; 32.30	1:34.21; 33.94	2:13.89; 39.68	16.53
