= Swimming at the 2006 Commonwealth Games – Men's 50 metre backstroke =

== Men's 50 m Backstroke - Final ==
Pos.	Lane	Athlete	R.T.	50 m	Tbh.
	3	Matthew Clay (ENG)	0.59	25.04	
	4	Liam Tancock (ENG)	0.59	25.10	0.06
	5	Gerhard Zandberg (RSA)	0.66	25.16	0.12
4	6	Matthew Welsh (AUS)	0.66	25.34	0.30
5	2	Keng Liat Lim (MAS)	0.62	25.77	0.73
6	1	Matthew Rose (CAN)	0.58	26.05	1.01
6	7	Andrew Lauterstein (AUS)	0.58	26.05	1.01
8	8	(New Zealand) Scott Talbot (NZL)	0.63	26.33	1.29

== Men's 50 m Backstroke - Semifinals ==
=== Men's 50 m Backstroke - Semifinal 01 ===
Pos.	Lane	Athlete	R.T.	50 m	Tbh.
1	4	(England) Matthew Clay (ENG)	0.59	25.49	
2	5	(Canada) Matthew Rose (CAN)	0.59	25.99	0.50
3	3	(New Zealand) Scott Talbot (NZL)	0.63	26.24	0.75
4	7	(South Africa) Garth Tune (RSA)	0.63	26.58	1.09
5	6	(Barbados) Nicholas Neckles (BAR)	0.57	26.66	1.17
6	2	(South Africa) Johannes Du Rand (RSA)	0.72	26.71	1.22
7	1	(The Bahamas) Chris Vythoulkas (BAH)	0.60	27.55	2.06
8	8	(Guyana) Onan Thom (GUY)	0.66	28.04	2.55

=== Men's 50 m Backstroke - Semifinal 02 ===
Pos.	Lane	Athlete	R.T.	50 m	Tbh.
1	4	Liam Tancock (ENG)	0.56	24.84 (GR)	
2	6	Gerhard Zandberg (RSA)	0.68	25.16	0.32
3	5	Matthew Welsh (AUS)	0.67	25.50	0.66
4	2	Keng Liat Lim (MAS)	0.63	25.71	0.87
5	3	Andrew Lauterstein (AUS)	0.68	25.92	1.08
6	7	Cameron Gibson (NZL)	0.73	26.75	1.91
7	1	David Dunford (KEN)	0.70	27.68	2.84
8	8	Gael Adam (MRI)	0.68	28.30	3.46

== Men's 50 m Backstroke - Heats ==
=== Men's 50 m Backstroke - Heat 01 ===
Pos.	Lane	Athlete	R.T.	50 m	Tbh.
1	3	Onan Thom (GUY)	0.67	28.33	
2	4	Jonathon Le Noury (GUE)	0.65	28.70	0.37
3	5	Gilbert Kaburu (UGA)	0.72	33.75	5.42

=== Men's 50 m Backstroke - Heat 02 ===
Pos.	Lane	Athlete	R.T.	50 m	Tbh.
1	4	Matthew Clay (ENG)	0.61	25.61 (GR)	
2	5	Matthew Rose (CAN)	0.58	25.75	0.14
3	3	Gerhard Zandberg (RSA)	0.66	26.31	0.70
4	6	Garth Tune (RSA)	0.62	26.93	1.32
5	7	Arun Karunaratne (SRI)	0.57	29.01	3.40
6	1	Michael O'connor (BER)	0.57	29.06	3.45
7	2	Jonathan Calderon (LCA)	0.65	29.28	3.67

=== Men's 50 m Backstroke - Heat 03 ===
Pos.	Lane	Athlete	R.T.	50 m	Tbh.
1	4	(Australia) Matthew Welsh (AUS)	0.67	25.66	
2	3	(New Zealand) Scott Talbot (NZL)	0.66	26.29	0.63
3	5	(Malaysia) Keng Liat Lim (MAS)	0.66	26.49	0.83
4	6	(New Zealand) Cameron Gibson (NZL)	0.71	26.74	1.08
5	2	(Mauritius) Gael Adam (MRI)	0.69	28.19	2.53
6	1	(Cayman Islands) Andrew Mackay (CAY)	0.60	28.43	2.77
7	7	(Bangladesh) Mohammad Rana (BAN)	0.78	29.47	3.81
8	8	(Gibraltar) Jamie Zammitt (GIB)	0.61	29.67	4.01

=== Men's 50 m Backstroke - Heat 04 ===
Pos.	Lane	Athlete	R.T.	50 m	Tbh.
1	4	Liam Tancock (ENG)	0.58	25.26 (GR)	
2	5	Andrew Lauterstein (AUS)	0.68	26.03	0.77
3	3	Nicholas Neckles (BAR)	0.58	26.41	1.15
4	6	Johannes Du Rand (RSA)	0.74	26.57	1.31
5	7	David Dunford (KEN)	0.66	27.43	2.17
6	2	Chris Vythoulkas (BAH)	0.61	27.53	2.27
7	8	Thomas Hollingsworth (GUE)	0.59	28.44	3.18
8	1	Dane Harrop (IOM)	0.73	29.06	3.80
