= Swimming at the 2006 Commonwealth Games – Women's 100 metre EAD freestyle =

== Women's 100 m EAD Freestyle - Final ==
Pos.	Lane	Athlete	R.T.	50 m	100 m	Tbh.
	4	Natalie du Toit (RSA)	0.90	29.87; 29.87	1:01.81; 31.94	0.79
	5	Valerie Grandmaison (CAN)	0.84	29.24; 29.24	1:01.02; 31.78	
	3	Anne Polinario (CAN)	0.82	29.91; 29.91	1:03.10; 33.19	2.08
4	2	Rhiannon Henry (WAL)	0.90	30.27; 30.27	1:02.51; 32.24	1.49
5	1	Katrina Maria Lewis (AUS)	0.84	30.76; 30.76	1:04.43; 33.67	3.41
6	6	Chelsey Marie Gotell (CAN)	0.75	30.60; 30.60	1:02.77; 32.17	1.75
7	7	Prudence Elise Watt (AUS)	0.79	30.57; 30.57	1:02.95; 32.38	1.93
8	8	Lichelle Jade Clarke (AUS)	0.92	34.92; 34.92	1:13.05; 38.13	12.03

== Women's 100 m EAD Freestyle - Heats ==
=== Women's 100 m EAD Freestyle - Heat 01 ===
Pos.	Lane	Athlete	R.T.	50 m	100 m	Tbh.
1	5	Chelsey Marie Gotell (CAN)	0.73	30.20; 30.20	1:02.55; 32.35	
2	4	Rhiannon Henry (WAL)	0.91	30.70; 30.70	1:02.68; 31.98	0.13
3	3	Prudence Elise Watt (AUS)	0.75	30.42; 30.42	1:03.18; 32.76	0.63
4	2	Kanchanmala Pande (IND)	0.91	44.29; 44.29	1:36.88; 52.59	34.33
5	7	Marie Danielle Patricia Mustapha (MRI)	1.05	45.45; 45.45	1:41.06; 55.61	38.51
DNS	6	Karolina Pelendritou (CYP)		DNS		

=== Women's 100 m EAD Freestyle - Heat 02 ===
Pos.	Lane	Athlete	R.T.	50 m	100 m	Tbh.
1	5	Natalie du Toit (RSA)	0.89	30.11; 30.11	1:02.25; 32.14	0.97
2	4	Valerie Grandmaison (CAN)	0.85	29.36; 29.36	1:01.28; 31.92	
3	3	Anne Polinario (CAN)	0.86	31.09; 31.09	1:03.96; 32.87	2.68
4	6	Katrina Maria Lewis (AUS)	0.86	31.26; 31.26	1:05.81; 34.55	4.53
5	2	Lichelle Jade Clarke (AUS)	0.89	35.24; 35.24	1:14.05; 38.81	12.77
6	7	Rui Si Theresa Goh (SIN)	0.63	44.78; 44.78	1:36.40; 51.62	35.12
