= South Africa at the 2006 Commonwealth Games =

- CG code: RSA
- CGA: South African Sports Confederation and Olympic Committee
- Website: sascoc.co.za

in Melbourne, Australia
- Flag bearers: Opening: Closing:
- Medals Ranked 5th: Gold 12 Silver 13 Bronze 13 Total 38

Commonwealth Games appearances (overview)
- 1930; 1934; 1938; 1950; 1954; 1958; 1962–1990; 1994; 1998; 2002; 2006; 2010; 2014; 2018; 2022; 2026; 2030

South Africa competed at the 2006 Commonwealth Games in Melbourne, finishing fifth on the medal table.

== Medals ==
| | (gold) | (silver) | (bronze) | Total |
|---|---|---|---|---|
| South Africa | 12 | 13 | 13 | 38 |

=== Gold ===
- Men's 4 × 100 m Freestyle Relay: Lyndon Ferns, Ryk Neethling, Roland Schoeman and Gerhard Zandberg sets up a Games record of 3:14.97, beating Australia (silver) and Canada (bronze).
- Women's 50 m EAD Freestyle: Natalie du Toit bettered the existing record twice (during Heat 2 and Final A) to 29.27 seconds.
- Men's 50 m Butterfly: Roland Schoeman
- Women's 100 m EAD Freestyle: Natalie du Toit
- Women's Javelin: Sunette Viljoen
- Men's Shot put: Janus Robberts
- Men's 50 m Freestyle: Roland Schoeman
- Women's Discus: Elizna Naude
- Women's Trap: Diane Swanton
- Men's 400 m Hurdles: Louis van Zyl
- Women's High Jump: Anika Smith
- Welterweight 69 kg: Bongani Mwelase

=== Silver ===
- Men's 200 m Backstroke: Johannes du Rand
- Men's 100 m Freestyle: Ryk Neethling
- Women's 100 m: Geraldine Pillay
- Men's 100 m EAD: Hilton Langenhoven
- Men's 400 m Hurdles: Alwyn Myburgh
- Men's 200 m EAD: David Roos
- Women's 50 m Rifle 3 Positions: Esmari van Reenen
- Men's Double Trap: Byron Swanton
- Men's Triple Jump: Khotso Mokoena
- Men's 4 × 100 m Relay
- Men's 4 × 400 m Relay
- Flyweight 51 kg: Jackson van Tonder Chauke
- Men's Road Race: David George

=== Bronze ===
- Men's 50 m Backstroke: Gerhard Zandberg
- Women's 50 m Butterfly: Lize-Mari Retief ties with Alice Mills of Australia
- Women's 200 m Breaststroke: Suzaan van Biljon
- Men's 25 m Standard Pistol Pairs: Allan Stuart McDonald and Daniel Francois van Tonder obtain a total of 1106, just behind Australia's 1112 and India's 1139.
- Men's 100 m Freestyle: Roland Schoeman
- Men's Lawn Bowls Triples: South Africa
- Men's 25 m Centre Fire Pistol Pairs: Allan Stuart McDonald and Daniel Francois van Tonder obtain a total of 1135, just behind England's 1138 and India's 1150.
- Men's 1500 m Freestyle: Troyden Prinsloo
- Women's Floor: Francki van Rooyen
- Women's 75 kg Weightlifting: Babalwa Ndleleni, becoming the first black woman to win a medal for the country at the Games.
- Women's 200 m: Geraldine Pillay
- Men's Hammer Throw: Christiaan Harmse
- Women's Lawn Bowls Singles: Lorna Trigwell

== South Africa's Team at the 2006 Commonwealth Games ==
=== Athletics ===
==== Men's Competition ====
- Sherwin Vries (100 m, 4 × 100 m)
- Leigh Julius (200 m, 4 × 100 m)
- Snyman Prinsloo (200 m, 4 × 100 m)
- Paul Gorries (400 m, 4 × 400 m)
- Jan van der Merwe (400 m, 4 × 400 m)
- Ofentse Mogawane (400 m, 4 × 400 m)
- Mbulaeni Mulaudzi (800 m)
- Tshamano Setone (5000 m)
- Boy Soke (5000 m)
- Ruben Ramolefi (3000 m steeplechase)
- Emmanuel Mkhabela (3000 m steeplechase
- Shaun Bownes (110 m hurdles)
- Ruan de Vries (110 m hurdles)
- Hennie Kotze (110 m hurdles)
- LJ van Zyl (4 × 400 m, 400 m hurdles)
- Pieter de Villiers (4 × 400 m, 400 m hurdles)
- Alwyn Myburgh (400 m hurdles, 4 × 400 m)
- Tseko Mpolokeng (marathon)
- Neo Molema (marathon)
- Okkert Brits (pole vault)
- Khotso Mokoena (long jump, triple jump)
- Martin McClintock (long jump)
- Yaw Fosu Amoah (long jump)
- Hardus Pienaar (javelin)
- Robert Oosthuizen (javelin)
- Lohan Rautenbach (javelin)
- Chris Harmse (hammer throw)
- Hannes Hopley (discus)
- Janus Robberts (shot put)
- Ramsay Carelse (high jump)
- Lee Roy Newton (4 × 100 m)
- Ruben Majola (4 × 400 m)
- Hilton Langenhoven (T12 100 m)
- Joseph van Nel (T12 100 m)
- David Roos (T46 200 m)

==== Women's Competition ====
- Geraldine Pillay (100 m, 200 m)
- Adri Schoeman (400 m, 4 × 400 m)
- Estie Wittstock (400 m, 4 × 400 m)
- Surita Febbraio (400 m hurdles, 4 × 400 m)
- Lebogang Phalula (800 m, 1500 m)
- Dina Lebo Phalula (800 m, 1500 m)
- Marlene Breytenbach (1500 m)
- Nolene Conrad (3000 m steeplechase)
- Tebogo Masehla (3000 m steeplechase)
- Nicolene Cronje (20 km walk)
- Suzanne Erasmus (20 km walk)
- Tanith Maxwell (marathon)
- Charne Rademeyer (marathon)
- Elizna Naudé (discus)
- Anika Smit (high jump)
- Marli Knoetze (shot put)
- Simone du Toit (shot put)
- Sunette Viljoen (javelin)
- Samantha Dodd (pole vault)
- Janice Josephs (heptathlon)
- Tsholofelo Selemela (4 × 400 m)
- Amanda Kotze (4 × 400 m)
- Dominique Vogel (T38 100 m)
- Thuliswa Mlinganiso (T38 100 m)

=== Basketball ===
==== Men's team competition ====
- Team roster

- Quintin Denyssen
- Vusi Dlamini
- Pat Engelbrecht
- Thabang Kgwedi
- Emmanuel Madondo
- Nakedi Maputla
- Brendan Mettler
- Kenneth Motaung
- Neo Mothiba
- Sipho Ngcobo
- Nyakallo Nthuping
- Chris Treurnicht

=== Cycling ===
- Mountain Bike

- Justice Makhale
- Burry Stander

- Road/Time Trial

- Ryan Cox
- David George
- Jock Green
- Robert Hunter
- Jeremy Maartens
- Rupert Rheeder

- Track

- Durwan Benjamin
- Garth Thomas

=== Gymnastics ===
- Maureen van Rooyen
- Christian Brezeanu
- Steven Friedman
- Troy Sender
- Gerhard Swiegers
- Candice Cronje
- Chanel Moonsammy
- Francki van Rooyen
- Rinette Whelpton
- Shalene Arnold
- Odette Richard
- Stephanie Sandler
- Mirriam Letsele

=== Field Hockey ===
==== Men's team competition ====
- Team roster

- Chris Hibbert
- Franci du Plessis
- Ken Forbes
- Kyle Rhodes
- Darryn Gallagher
- Bruce Jacobs
- John Paul
- Wayne Madsen
- Lungile Tsolekile
- Jody Paul
- Clyde Abrahams
- Ian Symons
- Leroy Phillips
- Charles Rose-Innes
- Reece Basson
- Justin Reid-Ross

- Head coach: Paul Revington

==== Women's team competition ====
- Team roster

- Caroline Jack
- Mariette Rix
- Kate Hector
- Nita Van Jaarsveldt
- Tarryn Hosking
- Lenise Marals
- Lesle-Ann George
- Marsha Marescia
- Tarryn Bright
- Kathleen Taylor
- Sharne Wehmeyer
- Lindsey Carlisle
- Henna du Buisson
- Fiona Butler
- Liesel Dorothy
- Jenny Wilson

- Head coach: Jenny King

=== Lawn Bowls ===
==== Men's Competition ====
- Team roster

- Shaun Addinall
- Gerry Baker
- Neil Burkett
- Kevin Campbell
- Eric Johannes
- Gidion Vermuelen

==== Women's Competition ====
- Team roster

- Rika Lynn
- Susan Nel
- Trish Steyn
- Lorna Trigwell
- Loraine Victor
- Colleen Webb

=== Netball ===
With a team captained by Charlene Hertzog and coached by Marlene Wagner, South Africa finished 7th in the netball at the 2006 Commonwealth Games. In the 7th/8th playoff, they defeated Wales 46–43.

Pool 1

| Saturday 18 March; 20:30 (UTC+11) | Report; Stats | Malawi | 57–56 | South Africa | Umpires: Anne Abraitis; Marion Johnson-Hurley; Reserve umpire: Bill Alexander |
| Saturday 18 March; 20:30 (UTC+11) | Report; Stats | Scoring by quarter: 15-19, 12-16, 14-9, 16-12 | | | Umpires: Anne Abraitis; Marion Johnson-Hurley; Reserve umpire: Bill Alexander |
| Saturday 18 March; 20:30 (UTC+11) | Report; Stats | Linda Magombo 30/36 (83%); Mary Waya 27/31 (87%) | | Sindisiwe Gumede 43/55 (78%); Lizanne Helmand 13/18 (72%) | Umpires: Anne Abraitis; Marion Johnson-Hurley; Reserve umpire: Bill Alexander |

| Sunday 19 March; 15:00 (UTC+11) | Stats | South Africa | 80–34 | Saint Vincent and the Grenadines | Umpires: Sharon Kelly; Chris Campbell; Reserve umpire: Pauline Sciascia |
| Sunday 19 March; 15:00 (UTC+11) | Stats | Scoring by quarter: 15-10, 23-8, 19-8, 23-8 | | | Umpires: Sharon Kelly; Chris Campbell; Reserve umpire: Pauline Sciascia |
| Sunday 19 March; 15:00 (UTC+11) | Stats | Sindisiwe Gumede 41/49 (84%); Christine Markgraaff 31/41 (76%); Lizanne Helmand 6/8 (75%); Nthabiseng Moabi 2/2 (100%) | | Galeine Gordon 18/20 (90%); Nicole Sandy 9/13 (69%); Samathea Christopher 7/10 (70%) | Umpires: Sharon Kelly; Chris Campbell; Reserve umpire: Pauline Sciascia |

| Tuesday 21 March; 18:30 (UTC+11) | Report; Stats | New Zealand | 74–37 | South Africa | Umpires: Carolene Logan; Chris Campbell; Reserve umpire: Marion Johnson-Hurley |
| Tuesday 21 March; 18:30 (UTC+11) | Report; Stats | Scoring by quarter: 23-11, 23-5, 14-11, 14-10 | | | Umpires: Carolene Logan; Chris Campbell; Reserve umpire: Marion Johnson-Hurley |
| Tuesday 21 March; 18:30 (UTC+11) | Report; Stats | Irene van Dyk 44/48 (92%); Belinda Colling 16/21 (76%); Maria Tutaia 14/19 (74%) | | Sindisiwe Gumede 30/35 (86%); Christine Markgraaff 6/8 (75%); Lizanne Helmand 1/3 (33%) | Umpires: Carolene Logan; Chris Campbell; Reserve umpire: Marion Johnson-Hurley |

| Wednesday 22 March; 15:00 (UTC+11) | Stats | South Africa | 56–51 | Fiji | Umpires: Michelle Phippard; Marion Johnson-Hurley; Reserve umpire: Anne Abraitis |
| Wednesday 22 March; 15:00 (UTC+11) | Stats | Scoring by quarter: 14-7, 15-14, 12-12, 15-18 | | | Umpires: Michelle Phippard; Marion Johnson-Hurley; Reserve umpire: Anne Abraitis |
| Wednesday 22 March; 15:00 (UTC+11) | Stats | Sindisiwe Gumede 40/46 (87%); Lizanne Helmand 10/13 (77%); Christine Markgraaff 6/6 (100%) | | Matelita Shaw 29/35 (83%); Taraima Rara 20/23 (87%); Maria Bereso 2/4 (50%) | Umpires: Michelle Phippard; Marion Johnson-Hurley; Reserve umpire: Anne Abraitis |

| Thursday 23 March; 19:00 (UTC+11) | Report; Stats | South Africa | 35–67 | England | Umpires: Pauline Sciascia; Michelle Phippard; Reserve umpire: Stacey Campton |
| Thursday 23 March; 19:00 (UTC+11) | Report; Stats | Scoring by quarter: 8-17, 13-12, 8-18, 6-20 | | | Umpires: Pauline Sciascia; Michelle Phippard; Reserve umpire: Stacey Campton |
| Thursday 23 March; 19:00 (UTC+11) | Report; Stats | Sindisiwe Gumede 27/33 (82%); Christine Markgraaff 6/9 (67%); Lizanne Helmand 2/7 (29%) | | Louisa Brownfield 47/53 (89%); Abby Teare 12/17 (71%); Pamela Cookey 8/10 (80%) | Umpires: Pauline Sciascia; Michelle Phippard; Reserve umpire: Stacey Campton |

Table

| Pos | Team | P | W | D | L | GF | GA | GD | Pts |
|---|---|---|---|---|---|---|---|---|---|
| 1 | New Zealand | 5 | 5 | 0 | 0 | 374 | 173 | +201 | 10 |
| 2 | England | 5 | 4 | 0 | 1 | 308 | 196 | +112 | 8 |
| 3 | Malawi | 5 | 3 | 0 | 2 | 262 | 282 | -20 | 6 |
| 4 | South Africa | 5 | 2 | 0 | 3 | 264 | 283 | -19 | 4 |
| 5 | Fiji | 5 | 1 | 0 | 4 | 228 | 293 | -65 | 2 |
| 6 | Saint Vincent and the Grenadines | 5 | 0 | 0 | 5 | 171 | 380 | -209 | 0 |

Qualified for Semi-finals
Qualified for Classification

7th/8th playoff

| Friday 24 March; 15:00 (UTC+11) | Report; Stats | South Africa | 46–43 | Wales | Umpires: Chris Campbell; Bobbi Brown; Reserve umpire: Anne Abraitis |
| Friday 24 March; 15:00 (UTC+11) | Report; Stats | Scoring by quarter: 11-15, 11-10, 12-9, 12-9 | | | Umpires: Chris Campbell; Bobbi Brown; Reserve umpire: Anne Abraitis |
| Friday 24 March; 15:00 (UTC+11) | Report; Stats | Christine Markgraaff 28/38 (74%); Sindisiwe Gumede 11/11 (100%); Lizanne Helmand 6/12 (50%); Nthabiseng Moabi 1/1 (100%) | | Rebecca James 31/41 (76%); Rhiannon Ace 12/19 (63%) | Umpires: Chris Campbell; Bobbi Brown; Reserve umpire: Anne Abraitis |

Squad

South Africa roster
Players
Coaches

| Name | Pos | DOB | Height | Club | Nat | Caps |
|---|---|---|---|---|---|---|
| Sindisiwe Gumede | GS, GA | 10 March 1980 (aged 26) | 1.92 m (6 ft 4 in) | Zululand |
| Nontle Gwavu | GK | 25 September 1984 (aged 21) | 1.74 m (5 ft 9 in) | Eastern Province |
| Lizanne Helmand | GS, GA | 17 August 1979 (aged 26) | 1.80 m (5 ft 11 in) | Northwest South |
| Charlene Hertzog (c) | C, WA, WD | 17 January 1980 (aged 26) | 1.81 m (5 ft 11 in) | Free State |
| Simnikiwe Malusi | C | 17 September 1982 (aged 23) | 1.65 m (5 ft 5 in) | Eastern Province |
| Christine Markgraaff | GS, GA | 16 March 1982 (aged 24) | 1.83 m (6 ft 0 in) | Boland |
| Zanele Mdodana | GD, WD | 18 February 1984 (aged 22) | 1.75 m (5 ft 9 in) | Eastern Province |
| Nthabiseng Moabi | WA, C, WD | 7 June 1982 (aged 23) | 1.64 m (5 ft 5 in) | Gauteng Central |
| Martha Mosoahle | WA | 2 June 1979 (aged 26) | 1.69 m (5 ft 7 in) | Gauteng Central |
| Adele Niemand | GK, GD, WD | 15 October 1984 (aged 21) | 1.81 m (5 ft 11 in) | Free State |
| Karin Venter | GK, GD | 24 February 1979 (aged 27) | 1.79 m (5 ft 10 in) | Free State |
| Leigh-Ann Zackey | GD | 14 August 1982 (aged 23) | 1.79 m (5 ft 10 in) | Central Gauteng |

Head coach

- Marlene Wagner

Notes

- (c) – Captain
- (cc) – Co-captain
- (vc) – Vice-captain
- – Injury / maternity leave
- (TRP) – Temporary Replacement Player

=== Rugby Sevens ===
==== Men's team competition ====
- Team roster

- Schalk van der Merwe (Golden Lions)
- Ryan Kankowski (Natal Sharks)
- Tobela Mdaka (Griffons)
- Jonathan Mokuena (Leopards)
- Zolani Mofu (Border)
- Stefan Basson (Vodacom Blue Bulls)
- Phillip Burger (Vodacom Cheetahs)
- Mzwandile Stick (Natal Sharks)
- Gio Aplon (Vodacom Western Province)
- Jaco Pretorius (Falcons)
- Antonius Verhoeven (Boland)
- Fabian Juries (Eastern Province)

=== Shooting ===
- Neels Bornman
- Etienne Cilliers
- Georgios Eleftheriou
- Byron Swanton
- Diane Swanton
- Nicolaas Swart
- Johan du Toit
- Robert Hayter
- Mohyedien Begg
- Allan McDonald
- Daniel van Tonder
- Martin Senore
- Esmari van Reenen
- Gavin van Rhyn
- Marli Vlok

=== Squash ===
- Diana Argyle
- Rodney Durbach
- Adrian Hansen
- Clinton Leeuw
- Tenille Swartz
- Craig van der Wath

=== Table Tennis ===
- Luke Abrahams
- Theo Cogill
- Shireen Lyners
- Sameera Maal
- Alet Moll (EAD)
- Shane Overmeyer
- Rosabelle Riese

=== Triathlon ===
- Hendrik de Villiers
- Mari Rabie
- Kate Roberts
- Brad Storm

=== Weightlifting ===
- Alphonso Adonis
- Darryn Anthony
- Ricardo Fitzpatrick (EAD)
- Greg Gerts
- Babalwa Ndeleni
- Evgeni Popov (EAD)
- Mona Pretorius
- Portia Vries
