= Cara (app) =

Art platform

- Logo
- Website type: Art portfolio; Social networking service
- Available in: English
- Founder: Zhang Jingna
- Website: cara.app
- Registration: Optional
- Launched: December 15, 2022; 3 years ago
- Current status: Active

Cara is an image sharing platform and social network for artists and creatives to share portfolios. It is available both as an app and as a website, and is run by founder Zhang Jingna and a group of volunteers. Cara states that it is "creators-first" and was founded to protect human artists from rapidly-proliferating AI-generated art on larger social media platforms such as Instagram and Facebook.

== History ==
=== Creation ===
Cara was founded by Zhang Jingna for artists against AI-scraping. Zhang has also stated that she has purposely avoided venture funding for Cara, as she does not want outside influence from investors to interfere with the interests of the platform and the artists on it. Zhang is among a group of many creators, including George R. R. Martin and The New York Times, who have filed lawsuits against large tech companies like Google over freely scraping the internet for content to use in their AI training data, much of which is copyrighted.

Cara opened for public testing on January 2, 2023. After Meta announced its decision to train its AI on all user-created content starting June 26, 2024, Cara quickly rose in popularity, growing from around 40,000 users to 650,000 in a single week, as artists migrated to avoid having their art trained on without proper procedures for compensation.

== Features ==
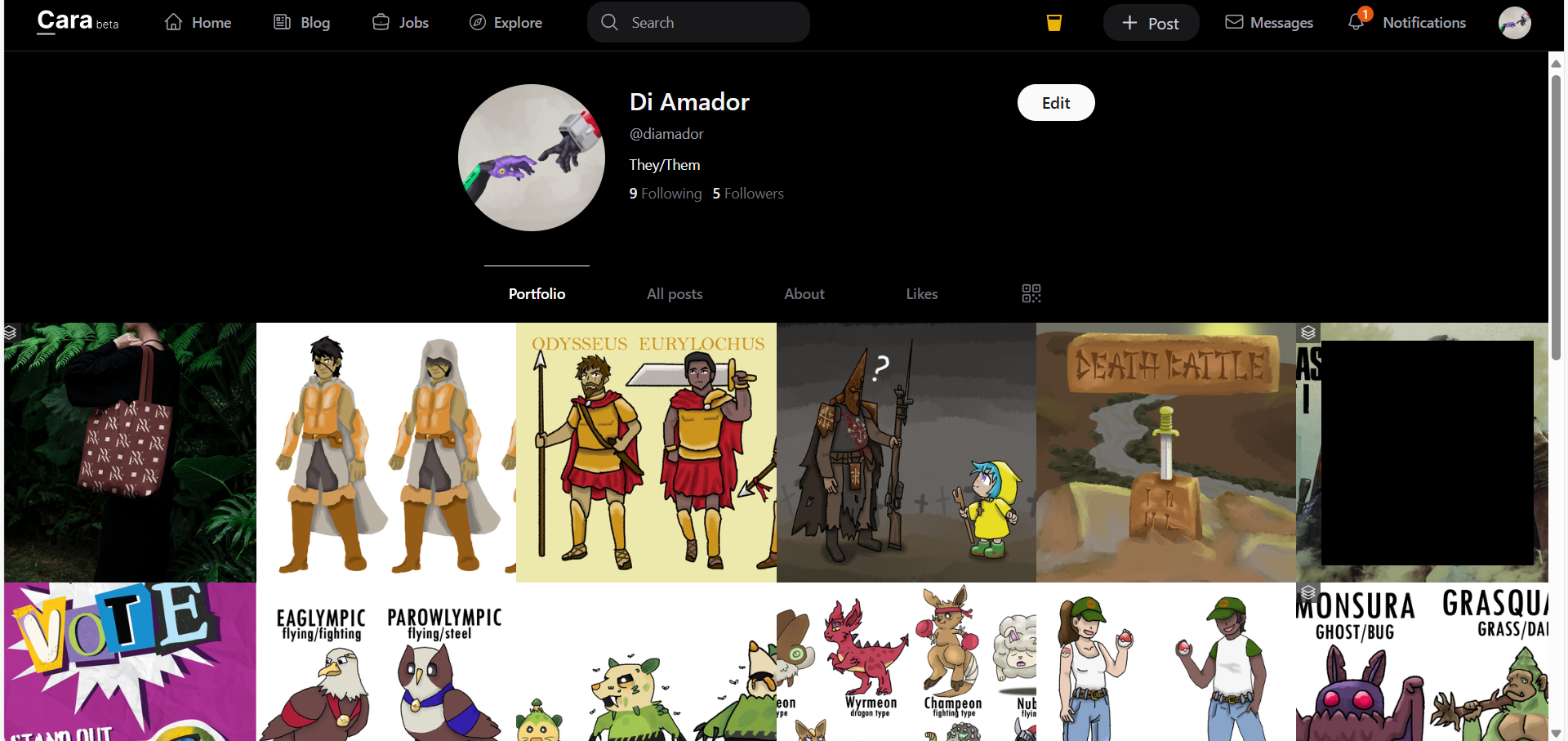
An example of a portfolio page on the Cara website in 2024.

User accounts on Cara can be "portfolio" or "community" accounts. Community accounts are the default. All accounts have the same user experience, but portfolio accounts receive a status badge.

Cara uses third-party content moderation services from Hive to prevent AI-generated art from being uploaded onto the site. Its "About" page states that Cara will not "host AI-generated portfolios unless the rampant ethical and data privacy issues around datasets are resolved via regulation."

Cara automatically tags its art with "NoAI" tags, a form of voluntary exclusion protocol to discourage AI scrapers.

On December 1, 2023, Cara introduced support for Glaze, a tool developed by SAND Lab at the University of Chicago. Artists could "glaze" their art during upload to disincentivize style mimicry by AI image generators. The images are subtly altered to data-poison any AI models trained on them, increasing the rate of output errors. On May 29, 2024, the feature was paused for community accounts over "security and access issues" concerning "abnormal usage patterns where people are creating multiple Cara accounts and maxing out daily Glaze credits uses".

== 2026 Image Scraping Attacks ==
In August 2026, Cara was the subject to several successful scraping attacks. On August 13, 2026, Reddit user MandarinDawnPoppy994 claimed that he was able to scrape a 12-terabyte archive (12 million works) from the website. However, he claimed that he was never going to make the data available to other parties, and after the visual artist Nijhia berated the scraper, he later deleted the dataset.

Later that month, another user known as "CaptiveDreamer" was able to scrape 8.5 million links as well as various metadata from Cara and uploaded them to AI developer platform Hugging Face. Hugging Face later deleted the list of metadata, but not the links, as no art was uploaded to the site.

On August 22, a third scraper scraped 123,000 images from Cara, as well as user bios that obtained personal information, and uploaded them to a torrenting site. Following this event, Cara launched a GoFundMe to fund legal fees for the site.

MandarinDawnPoppy994, which Wired later identified as a student in North America known as "Heft", later became a troubleshooter for Cara and is collaborating with Zhang to create a "one-way fingerprint" called Lantern that would allow artists to identify if their art appears in an public AI image dataset.

== Reception ==
Miles Klee at Rolling Stone noted Cara as an example of a broader public backlash against over-hyped low-quality generative AI products. The Independent interviewed a tattoo artist who believed the growth of Cara was also driven by "general dissatisfaction with existing platforms and their lack of engagement," an issue that existed before social media platforms announced their plans to train generative AI on user data.

Tom May at Creative Boom interviewed artists who felt cautious optimism but also exhaustion at the prospect of rebuilding their audiences on a small platform. Some interviewees expressed concerns that Cara may be too "artist-centric," and that one of its weak points is a lack of a non-artist audience to gain exposure to artists. May also pointed out that companies such as Google and OpenAI started out with good intentions just as Cara did, but later reneged on their mottos and mission statements in the name of profit.
