= Josh Krogh =

Australian swimmer (b. 1982)

Personal information
- Born: Joshua Krogh; 3 April 1982 (age 44)

Sport
- Country: Australia
- Sport: Swimming
- Event: Freestyle / Butterfly
Medal record
World Championships (SC)
Silver medal – second place	2004 Indianapolis	4x200 m freestyle
Commonwealth Games
Bronze medal – third place	2006 Melbourne	200m butterfly
Bronze medal – third place	2006 Melbourne	4x200m freestyle

Joshua Krogh (born 3 April 1982) is an Australian former freestyle and butterfly swimmer.

A swimmer from the Sunshine Coast, Krogh was the anchor in the 4 × 200 m freestyle relay team which took silver at the 2004 FINA Short Course World Championships in Indianapolis. He had gained a lead over his American opponent Justin Mortimer in the last lap but was bettered in the final reach for the wall.

At the 2004 Olympic trials, Krogh came third in the 400 metres behind Grant Hackett and Craig Stevens, with only the first two placings qualifying. Stevens later withdrew from the event to make way for Ian Thorpe, who had been disqualified for a false start. There was speculation as to whether Krogh was legally entitled to the vacated spot, but he himself declared that he would not make a claim to the position.

In 2006, Krogh represented Australia at the Melbourne Commonwealth Games and was a bronze medalist in the 200 metre butterfly. He also swam the anchor of the 4 x 200 metres freestyle relay and began with a 0.35 second lead, before having to hang on for a bronze medal, behind England and Scotland.
