= Swimming at the 2006 Commonwealth Games – Men's 200 metre backstroke =

This article provides table of standings for the Men's 200 metres backstroke during the 2006 Commonwealth Games.

== Men's 200 m Backstroke - Final ==
Pos.	Lane	Athlete	R.T.	50 m	100 m	150 m	200 m	Tbh.
	4	(Scotland) Gregor Tait (SCO)	0.63	27.92; 27.92	57.93; 30.01	1:28.46; 30.53	1:58.65 (GR); 30.19	
	5	(South Africa) Johannes Du Rand (RSA)	0.79	28.57; 28.57	59.38; 30.81	1:29.55; 30.17	2:00.32; 30.77	1.67
	7	(New Zealand) Cameron Gibson (NZL)	0.78	28.77; 28.77	59.30; 30.53	1:30.44; 31.14	2:00.72; 30.28	2.07
4	3	(Barbados) Nicholas Neckles (BAR)	0.59	27.99; 27.99	58.68; 30.69	1:29.78; 31.10	2:01.25; 31.47	2.60
5	6	(Canada) Desmond Strelzow (CAN)	0.71	28.44; 28.44	58.97; 30.53	1:30.45; 31.48	2:01.43; 30.98	2.78
6	2	(Wales) Thomas Haffield (WAL)	0.67	29.31; 29.31	1:00.84; 31.53	1:32.46; 31.62	2:03.71; 31.25	5.06
7	1	(Guernsey) Ian Powell (GUE)	0.66	30.11; 30.11	1:02.30; 32.19	1:34.87; 32.57	2:07.30; 32.43	8.65
8	8	(Kenya) David Dunford (KEN)	0.72	29.70; 29.70	1:02.14; 32.44	1:35.51; 33.37	2:08.71; 33.20	10.06

== Men's 200 m Backstroke - Heats ==
=== Men's 200 m Backstroke - Heat 01 ===
Pos.	Lane	Athlete	R.T.	50 m	100 m	150 m	200 m	Tbh.
1	4	(Canada) Desmond Strelzow (CAN)	0.71	29.31; 29.31	1:00.02; 30.71	1:31.58; 31.56	2:02.58; 31.00	
2	5	(New Zealand) Cameron Gibson (NZL)	0.81	29.92; 29.92	1:01.50; 31.58	1:33.69; 32.19	2:05.30; 31.61	2.72
3	3	(Guernsey) Ian Powell (GUE)	0.61	29.83; 29.83	1:01.84; 32.01	1:33.84; 32.00	2:06.02; 32.18	3.44
4	7	(Kenya) David Dunford (KEN)	0.68	29.23; 29.23	1:01.75; 32.52	1:35.34; 33.59	2:09.01; 33.67	6.43
5	6	(India) Arjun Muralidharan (IND)	0.67	30.22; 30.22	1:02.88; 32.66	1:36.36; 33.48	2:11.23; 34.87	8.65
6	2	(Isle of Man) Dane Harrop (IOM)	0.80	30.33; 30.33	1:02.96; 32.63	1:37.16; 34.20	2:11.59; 34.43	9.01
7	1	(Cayman Islands) Andrew Mackay (CAY)	0.57	30.85; 30.85	1:05.12; 34.27	1:40.64; 35.52	2:14.98; 34.34	12.40

=== Men's 200 m Backstroke - Heat 02 ===
Pos.	Lane	Athlete	R.T.	50 m	100 m	150 m	200 m	Tbh.
1	4	(Scotland) Gregor Tait (SCO)	0.68	28.38; 28.38	59.36; 30.98	1:30.51; 31.15	2:01.85; 31.34	
2	5	(South Africa) Johannes Du Rand (RSA)	0.82	29.01; 29.01	1:01.02; 32.01	1:32.56; 31.54	2:02.33; 29.77	0.48
3	3	(Barbados) Nicholas Neckles (BAR)	0.60	28.34; 28.34	59.44; 31.10	1:31.02; 31.58	2:02.57; 31.55	0.72
4	6	(Wales) Thomas Haffield (WAL)	0.70	29.19; 29.19	1:00.81; 31.62	1:32.55; 31.74	2:03.77; 31.22	1.92
5	7	(South Africa) Garth Tune (RSA)	0.61	29.23; 29.23	1:01.46; 32.23	1:34.60; 33.14	2:09.58; 34.98	7.73
6	2	(Guernsey) Thomas Hollingsworth (GUE)	0.59	30.01; 30.01	1:02.89; 32.88	1:36.64; 33.75	2:10.75; 34.11	8.90
7	8	(India) Rehan Poncha (IND)	0.67	31.21; 31.21	1:04.23; 33.02	1:37.92; 33.69	2:12.33; 34.41	10.48
8	1	(Mauritius) Gael Adam (MRI)	0.74	30.27; 30.27	1:04.00; 33.73	1:39.13; 35.13	2:14.35; 35.22	12.50
