= Swimming at the 2006 Commonwealth Games – Women's 50 metre EAD freestyle =

Women's 50 metre EAD freestyle at the 2006 Commonwealth Games
- Venue: Melbourne Sports & Aquatic Centre
- Dates: 17 March 2006
- Competitors: 12 from 8 nations
- Winning time: 29.27

Medalists
gold medal	Natalie du Toit	South Africa
silver medal	Anne Polinario	Canada
bronze medal	Annabelle Josephine Williams	Australia

The Women's 50 metre EAD freestyle event at the 2006 Commonwealth Games was held on 17 March 2006 at the Melbourne Sports & Aquatic Centre.

== Results ==
=== Heats ===
==== Heat 1 ====
Pos.	Lane	Athlete	R.T.	50m	Tbh.
1	4	Valerie Grandmaison (CAN)	0.89	28.70	
2	2	Katrina Maria Lewis (AUS)	0.83	30.04	1.34
3	5	Chelsey Marie Gotell (CAN)	0.75	29.03	0.33
4	3	Rhiannon Henry (WAL)	0.95	29.37	0.67
5	6	Karolina Pelendritou (CYP)	0.79	30.54	1.84
6	7	Marie Danielle Patricia Mustapha (MRI)	1.03	44.38	15.68

==== Heat 2 ====
Pos.	Lane	Athlete	R.T.	50m	Tbh.
1	6	Natalie du Toit (RSA)	0.91	29.32 (WR/AR/NR)	0.49
2	5	Anne Polinario (CAN)	0.87	28.83	
3	2	Annabelle Josephine Williams (AUS)	0.66	30.03	1.20
4	3	Prudence Elise Watt (AUS)	0.79	28.93	0.10
5	7	Rui Si Theresa Goh (SIN)	0.65	45.29	16.46
6	4	Kanchanmala Pande (IND)	1.31	42.40	13.57

=== Final ===
Pos.	Lane	Athlete	R.T.	50m	Tbh.
	4	Natalie du Toit (RSA)	0.86	29.27 (WR/AR/NR)	0.95
	5	Anne Polinario (CAN)	0.90	28.63	0.31
	3	Annabelle Josephine Williams (AUS)	0.63	30.25	1.93
4	6	Valerie Grandmaison (CAN)	0.86	28.32	
5	7	Katrina Maria Lewis (AUS)	0.83	29.64	1.32
6	1	Chelsey Marie Gotell (CAN)	0.75	29.06	0.74
7	2	Prudence Elise Watt (AUS)	0.77	29.07	0.75
8	8	Rhiannon Henry (WAL)	0.93	29.43	1.11
