= Singapore at the 1958 British Empire and Commonwealth Games =

- CG code: SIN

in Cardiff, Wales
- Medals: Gold 2 Silver 0 Bronze 0 Total 2

British Empire and Commonwealth Games appearances
- 1958; 1962; 1966; 1970; 1974; 1978; 1982; 1986; 1990; 1994; 1998; 2002; 2006; 2010; 2014; 2018; 2022; 2026; 2030

Singapore competed at the 1958 British Empire and Commonwealth Games in Cardiff, Wales, for its first time at the Commonwealth Games. It was represented by three athletes, competing in two sports. It won two gold medals from weightlifting.

== Medalists ==
Medal	Name	Sport	Event
Gold	Tan Ser Cher	Weightlifting	60kg Combined
Gold	Tan Howe Liang	Weightlifting	67.5kg Combined

== Weightlifting ==
Tan Howe Liang broke the world record by lifting 347 pounds in the Clean & Jerk portion in the 67.5kg Combined weight event.

Athlete	Event	Snatch		Clean & Jerk		Total	Rank
Athlete	Event	Result	Rank	Result	Rank	Total	Rank
Tan Ser Cher	60kg Combined					685 pounds	1st place, gold medalist(s)
Tan Howe Liang	67.5kg Combined	443 pounds		347 pounds	1	790 pounds	1st place, gold medalist(s)

== Athletics ==
Men
Track events

Athlete	Event	Quarterfinal		Semifinal		Final	
Athlete	Event	Result	Rank	Result	Rank	Result	Rank
Tan Eng Yoon	100 yards	10.3		did not advance			
Tan Eng Yoon	Triple Jump					48 ft 9 1/4 in (14.87 m)	8
