= Michael Perry (triple jumper) =

Australian triple jumper

Michael Perry (born 30 September 1977) is an Australian triple jumper.

Winning the 2005 Australian National Championships in Sydney after defeating Andrew Murphy in his last attempt and ending Murph's reign of 12 consecutive National titles. He finished ninth at the 2006 Commonwealth Games

His personal best is 16.67 metres, achieved in Brisbane November 2005.
