= Athletics at the 2006 Commonwealth Games – Men's triple jump =

Men's triple jump at the Commonwealth Games

The men's triple jump event at the 2006 Commonwealth Games was held on March 25.

== Results ==
Rank	Athlete	Nationality	#1	#2	#3	#4	#5	#6	Result	Notes
1st place, gold medalist(s)	Phillips Idowu	England	17.45	17.18	x	x	x	x	17.45	SB
2nd place, silver medalist(s)	Khotso Mokoena	South Africa	16.68	13.87	16.95	16.70	14.94	16.10	16.95	
3rd place, bronze medalist(s)	Alwyn Jones	Australia	16.51	x	16.65	16.75	x	16.66	16.75	
4	Andrew Murphy	Australia	15.97	16.54	x	x	16.70	15.97	16.70	SB
5	LeJuan Simon	Trinidad and Tobago	16.37	x	16.14	16.52	16.59	16.53	16.59	SB
6	Randy Lewis	Grenada	14.82	16.53	x	x	x	x	16.53	
7	Christopher Hercules	Trinidad and Tobago	16.25	16.47	16.23	x	16.19	x	16.47	
8	Wilbert Walker	Jamaica	13.92	x	16.33	x	x	16.04	16.33	PB
9	Michael Perry	Australia	16.24	16.03	15.68				16.24	
10	Steven Shalders	Wales	x	16.18	15.85				16.18	
11	Antonio Saunders	Bahamas	15.44	15.55	15.85				15.85	
12	Ayata Joseph	Antigua and Barbuda	x	15.48	x				15.48	
