= Swimming at the 2006 Commonwealth Games – Women's 200 metre breaststroke =

== Women's 200 m Breaststroke - Final ==
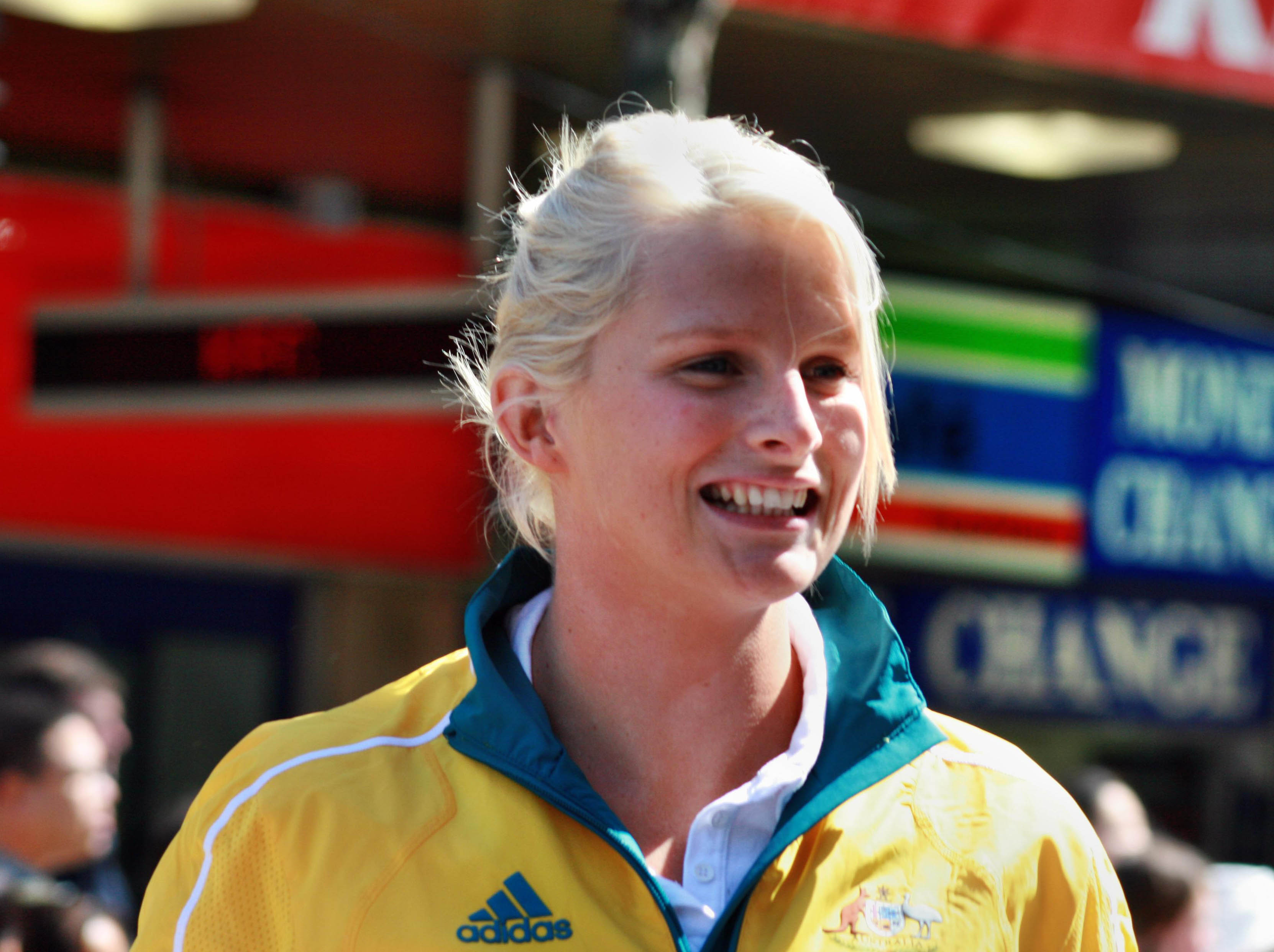
Leisel Jones

18 Mar 2006, 19:52 Final Results for Event 19: Women's 200m Breaststroke

Pos.	Lane	Athlete	R.T.	50 m	100 m	150 m	200 m	Tbh.
	3	Leisel Jones (AUS)	0.77	32.29; 32.29	1:08.27; 35.98	1:44.94; 36.67	2:20.72 (GR); 35.78	
	4	Kirsty Balfour (SCO)	0.85	33.15; 33.15	1:09.55; 36.40	1:46.36; 36.81	2:24.04; 37.68	3.32
	5	Suzaan van Biljon (RSA)	0.74	33.26; 33.26	1:10.56; 37.30	1:47.88; 37.32	2:25.39; 37.51	4.67
4	2	Brooke Hanson (AUS)	0.78	33.26; 33.26	1:10.67; 37.41	1:48.71; 38.04	2:27.29; 38.58	6.57
5	6	Sally Foster (AUS)	0.77	33.78; 33.78	1:11.95; 38.17	1:50.86; 38.91	2:29.37; 38.51	8.65
6	7	Tamaryn Laubscher (RSA)	0.77	34.11; 34.11	1:12.06; 37.95	1:51.25; 39.19	2:31.72; 40.47	11.00
7	8	Jean-Marie Neethling (RSA)	0.73	34.90; 34.90	1:13.66; 38.76	1:52.82; 39.16	2:32.47; 39.65	11.75
8	1	Kerry Buchan (SCO)	0.80	34.09; 34.09	1:12.73; 38.64	1:52.74; 40.01	2:33.70; 40.96	12.98

== Women's 200 m Breaststroke - Heats ==
=== Women's 200 m Breaststroke - Heat 01 ===
Pos.	Lane	Athlete	R.T.	50 m	100 m	150 m	200 m	Tbh.
1	3	(Scotland) Kirsty Balfour (SCO)	0.82	33.63; 33.63	1:10.49; 36.86	1:48.05; 37.56	2:26.18; 38.13	
2	5	(South Africa) Suzaan van Biljon (RSA)	0.74	33.13; 33.13	1:10.45; 37.32	1:48.63; 38.18	2:28.31; 39.68	2.13
3	4	(Australia) Sally Foster (AUS)	0.68	33.96; 33.96	1:12.15; 38.19	1:51.59; 39.44	2:31.10; 39.51	4.92
4	6	(South Africa) Jean-Marie Neethling (RSA)	0.74	34.63; 34.63	1:13.82; 39.19	1:53.40; 39.58	2:34.09; 40.69	7.91
5	7	(Namibia) Dannie'Lle Van Zijl (NAM)	0.83	37.44; 37.44	1:20.22; 42.78	2:03.86; 43.64	2:49.19; 45.33	23.01
6	1	(Barbados) Alexis Jordan (BAR)	0.80	38.42; 38.42	1:21.31; 42.89	2:05.19; 43.88	2:49.48; 44.29	23.30
7	8	(Kenya) Nasra Nandha (KEN)	0.84	42.40; 42.40	1:32.08; 49.68	2:23.30; 51.22	3:16.28; 52.98	50.10
DNS	2	(New Zealand) Annabelle Carey (NZL)						

=== Women's 200 m Breaststroke - Heat 02 ===
Pos.	Lane	Athlete	R.T.	50 m	100 m	150 m	200 m	Tbh.
1	4	Leisel Jones (AUS)	0.80	33.26; 33.26	1:12.14; 38.88	1:50.89; 38.75	2:29.96; 39.07	
2	2	Lauren van Oosten (CAN)	0.75	34.25; 34.25	1:13.10; 38.85	1:52.91; 39.81	2:32.70; 39.79	2.74
3	5	Brooke Hanson (AUS)	0.73	33.94; 33.94	1:13.86; 39.92	1:54.26; 40.40	2:32.94; 38.68	2.98
4	3	Tamaryn Laubscher (RSA)	0.77	34.98; 34.98	1:13.55; 38.57	1:52.83; 39.28	2:33.82; 40.99	3.86
5	6	Kerry Buchan (SCO)	0.77	34.18; 34.18	1:13.34; 39.16	1:53.11; 39.77	2:33.94; 40.83	3.98
6	1	Gail Strobridge (GUE)	0.78	36.94; 36.94	1:18.89; 41.95	2:01.08; 42.19	2:44.01; 42.93	14.05
7	7	Alia Atkinson (JAM)	0.76	36.02; 36.02	1:18.49; 42.47	2:01.45; 42.96	2:45.81; 44.36	15.85
8	8	Mayumi Raheem (SRI)	0.81	37.25; 37.25	1:21.28; 44.03	2:05.29; 44.01	2:48.15; 42.86	18.19
