= Singapore at the 1966 British Empire and Commonwealth Games =

- CG code: SIN
- CGA: Singapore National Olympic Council
- Website: www.singaporeolympics.com

in Kingston, Jamaica
- Medals: Gold 0 Silver 0 Bronze 0 Total 0

British Empire and Commonwealth Games appearances
- 1958; 1962; 1966; 1970; 1974; 1978; 1982; 1986; 1990; 1994; 1998; 2002; 2006; 2010; 2014; 2018; 2022; 2026; 2030

Singapore competed at the 1966 British Empire and Commonwealth Games in Kingston, Jamaica, for the first time as an independent state. It participated in six sports but did not win any medals.
