= Zhang Jingna =

Chinese-Singaporean photographer

- Born: 4 May 1988 (age 38); Beijing, People's Republic of China
- Style: Photography
- Awards: 2018; Forbes 30 Under 30 Asia; 2015; 7th Julia Margaret Cameron Award for Women Photographers Recipient; 2011; Photographer of the Year, Elle Awards, Singapore
- Sports career
Medal record
Women's shooting
Representing Singapore
Commonwealth Games
| Bronze medal – third place | 2007 Melbourne | Women's 10m Air Rifle (Pairs) |
- Website: zhangjingna.com

Zhang Jingna (simplified Chinese: 张晶娜; traditional Chinese: 張晶娜; pinyin: Zhāng Jīngnà; born 4 May 1988 in Beijing) is a Singaporean photographer widely known as "zemotion." Her works have appeared on multiple editions of Vogue, Elle and Harper's Bazaar. Zhang founded the art platform Cara in 2023.

== Biography ==
=== Early life ===
Zhang was born in the suburbs of Beijing, China to a sporting family. She moved to Singapore at the age of 8, where she attended Haig Girls' School.

=== Air rifle ===
At the age of fourteen, Zhang enrolled in Raffles Girls' School, where she began training in air rifle. She broke her first national record after nine months and subsequently joined the national team. She was active in the team for six years.

Zhang's notable achievements within the sport include breaking a record in the 10m Air Rifle event at the Commonwealth Shooting Championships 2005 in Melbourne, and a bronze in the same event at the Commonwealth Games in 2006. She was awarded Sports Girl of the Year 2006 by the Singapore National Olympic Council for her performances.

=== Art school and photography ===
Zhang declined the option to go on to junior college for A Levels and pursued a degree in fashion design at LASALLE College of the Arts. She picked up photography there as a hobby when she was eighteen. Probably due to her keen interest and achievements with the medium, she left Lasalle and the national team to pursue photography full-time in 2008.

Zhang's clientele since then include Mercedes-Benz, Canon, Pond's, Ogilvy & Mather Advertising and Wacom. She also produced fashion editorials for magazines such as Vogue, Harper's Bazaar, and Elle.

In fall 2008, Zhang held her first solo exhibition, "Something Beautiful", at The Arts House in Singapore. In 2010, 50 of her works were showcased along Orchard Road during Singapore's fashion festival – Fashion Seasons @ Orchard. It was Singapore's first large scale street exhibition featuring fashion photography.

In late 2010, Zhang announced her second gallery exhibition, "Angel Dreams". The show was held at Japan Creative Centre in Singapore with the support of Embassy of Japan. The event was noted for her photographs of Japanese musician Sugizo (Luna Sea, X Japan).

In 2013 she was selected to be part of Vogue Italia's "A Glimpse at Photo Vogue" exhibition at Galleria Carla Sozzani in Milan.

Zhang is influenced by people such as Peter Lindbergh, John William Waterhouse, Yoshitaka Amano and Zdzisław Beksiński. She also cites her friend Kuang Hong, a fellow artist, as one of the influences to her early artistic development.

In 2013 Zhang started a personal project entitled "Motherland Chronicles". With the project she sought to explore subjects she loved during her childhood, including themes from anime, manga, and Japanese fantasy art. The project is intended for publication as an art book in 2014.

=== Collaborations, other interests ===
Zhang photographed Sugizo multiple times in 2009 and 2010. She also shot his band Luna Sea's 20th Anniversary World Tour Reboot concert at the Tokyo Dome in 2010. Her photographs of Sugizo from the collaborations and concerts are collected in his book Ongaku ni ai sareta otoko: Sono haran no hansei (音楽に愛された男。その波乱の半生), the cover features an image from their first collaboration in Japan.

In 2011 Zhang photographed Korean celebrity Rain for Anchor Beer's campaign in Seoul.

Zhang also worked with cosplayer Alodia Gosiengfiao. They collaborated on a tribute piece to Japanese artist and illustrator Yoshitaka Amano.

From 2011–2013, Zhang owned and managed a semi-professional Starcraft 2 team called Infinity Seven.

=== Career ===
In 2021, Zhang announced that she decided to quit fashion photography, citing racism within the Western market. In posts uploaded to Facebook and Instagram, Zhang stated that her experiences with racism and xenophobia had prompted her to leave the industry.

In 2022, her portraits of actress Michelle Yeoh were featured in Time magazine's 100 Most Influential People and as the cover photos for a profile for The Hollywood Reporter.

=== Intellectual property infringement of Zhang's work in Luxembourg ===
In May 2022, Zhang was alerted by Luxembourgish fans about possible copyright infringement of her work. The student and oil painter Jeff Dieschburg had used one of her photos as reference for the left panel of his diptych painting "Turandot". Strassen Biennial of Contemporary Art art competition in Luxembourg rewarded him with a prize 1500€ for his contribution of several works, among them Turandot, up for sale for 6500€ in June 2022. Zhang accused Dieschburg via social media of plagiarism and her posts went viral. News outlets noted the "obvious similarities" while Dieschburg justified the use of his work, claiming it as "inspiration" and being part of a larger work. As response to the accusations and to counteract the massive hate and death threats that he received, Dieschburg refused the prize money and removed the diptych from the exhibition. One month later, Zhang took Dieschburg to court and on 14 October 2022, she lost in the „Chambre des référés“. She then took the case to the „Chambres Civiles“ and on 7 December 2022, the court ruled again in favour of Dieschburg. In February 2024, Zhang traveled to Luxembourg to attend the appeal after loss in the first instance. In May 2024 the Luxembourg district court rendered its verdict: Zhang's intellectual property rights were recognized, and the left panel of Dieschburg's work Turandot was condemned as plagiarism.

=== Cara ===
On 2 January 2023, Zhang opened Cara, an art platform designed to prevent AI-scraping, to public testing. The site quickly rose in popularity around June 2024, growing from around 40,000 users to 650,000 in a single week, as artists migrated to avoid having their art trained on without proper procedures for compensation.

== Awards ==
- 2006 Sportsgirl of the Year, Singapore Sports Award, Singapore
- 2007 Master Photographer of the Year, Singapore Master Photographer Print Competition, Singapore
- 2008 Overseas Fashion & Press Photographer of the Year, British Professional Photography Awards, Newcastle, UK
- 2009 3rd Place Advertising: Catalogue, International Photography Awards
- 2009 3rd Place Fine Art: Nudes, International Photography Awards
- 2011 Photographer of the Year, Elle Awards, Singapore
- 2012 Honorable Mention in Fine Art: Portraits, Fine Art: Nudes, and Advertising: Fashion, International Photography Awards
- 2013 Best Beauty/Glamor Photographer, FRAMED Awards, Las Vegas, USA
- 2013 Young Photographer of the Year, Mobius Awards
- 2015 Recipient, 7th Julia Margaret Cameron Award for Women Photographers
- 2017 Gold, Portraiture, Px3 Prix de la Photographie, Paris
- 2018 Forbes 30 Under 30 Asia, Arts

== Exhibitions ==
=== Solo exhibitions ===
- 2008 Something Beautiful, The Arts House, Singapore, 2008
- 2010 Fashion Season @ Orchard Street Exhibition, Orchard Road, Singapore, 2010
- 2010 Angel Dreams, Japan Creative Center, Singapore, 2010
- 2017 PURE, Hjo Culture Center, Sweden

=== Group exhibitions ===
- 2013 Vogue Italia: "A Glimpse at Photo Vogue", Galleria Carla Sozzani, Milan, 2013

== Books ==
- Zhang Jingna Postcard Collection (2009, ISBN 978-981-08-3810-2)
- Something Beautiful (2008, ISBN 978-981-08-1309-3)
