= Singapore at the 1962 British Empire and Commonwealth Games =

- CGF code: SIN
- CGA: Singapore National Olympic Council
- Website: www.singaporeolympics.com

in Perth, Western Australia
- Medals Ranked 10th: Gold 1 Silver 1 Bronze 0 Total 2

British Empire and Commonwealth Games appearances
- 1958; 1962; 1966; 1970; 1974; 1978; 1982; 1986; 1990; 1994; 1998; 2002; 2006; 2010; 2014; 2018; 2022; 2026; 2030

Singapore competed at the 1962 British Empire and Commonwealth Games in Perth, Western Australia, from 22 November to 1 December 1962. This was the first and only time Singapore competed as a self-governing British colony.

== Medalists ==
Medal	Name	Sport	Event	Date	Ref
Gold	Tan Howe Liang	Weightlifting	Middleweight		
Silver	Chua Phung Kim	Weightlifting	Bantamweight		

== See also ==
- Singapore at the 1960 Summer Olympics
- Malaysia at the 1964 Summer Olympics
