= Diane Swanton =

South African sport shooter (born 1979)

Personal information
- Nationality: South Africa
- Born: 11 August 1979 (age 46) Pretoria, South Africa
- Height: 1.68 m (5 ft 6 in)
- Weight: 77 kg (170 lb)

Sport
- Sport: Shooting
- Event: Trap
- Club: Centurion Gun Club
- Coached by: Tim Swanton (father)
Medal record
Women's shooting
Representing South Africa
Commonwealth Games
Gold medal – first place	2006 Melbourne	Trap

Diane Swanton (born August 11, 1979, in Pretoria) is a South African sport shooter. She won the gold medal for trap shooting at the 2006 Commonwealth Games in Melbourne, Australia, with a games record of 72 points. Swanton also received a qualifying place for the Olympics by capturing the gold in the same category at the 2007 ISSF African Shooting Championships in Cairo, Egypt, defeating Namibia's Gaby Ahrens.

At age twenty-nine, Swanton made her official debut for the 2008 Summer Olympics in Beijing, where she competed in women's trap shooting. She placed seventeenth out of twenty shooters in the qualifying rounds, behind Great Britain's Charlotte Kerwood by one target, with a total score of 57 points.

Swanton is also a member of Centurion Gun Club in Centurion, and is coached and trained by her father Tim Swanton.
