= Kanchanmala Pande =

Indian swimmer

Personal information
- Born: Kanchanmala Pande; 31 December 1990 (age 35) Amravati, Maharashtra, India

Sport
- Country: India
- Sport: Para swimming
- Position: World champion 2017 IPC Para world championship Mexico City
- Disability: Visually Impaired
- Disability class: S11, SB11, SM11
- Events: Breaststroke, Backstroke, Freestyle and Individual medley
Medal record
Women's Para swimming
Representing India
IDM Berlin
Silver medal – second place	2017 Mexico City	Women's 200m IM

Kanchanmala D Pande is a blind international female swimmer. She has won several medals at international, National and State level since she was a child. Her current medal tally stands at 120 including 115 gold, 4 silver and 1 bronze at international, national and state levels. She has competed successfully with sighted swimmers at all levels.

Pande has won eleven international medals, including the world championship in 2017 at Mexico apart from participation in Commonwealth Games, 2006 at Australia, FESPIC Games 2006 at Malaysia, Para-Asian games 2010, at China and numerous other tournaments. She has always been a gold medalist at national and state levels. She has made a remarkable comeback after her maternity by winning three golds in the national championship and intends to participate in forthcoming national and international tournaments including Asian para games. She is class I officer in the Reserve Bank of India

== Honours and awards ==
Kanchanmala has been honored with numerous awards, including:

- NCPEDP-Mindtree Special jury Helen Keller award 2021.
- The National award for Persons with Disabilities in the best sports person category on 3 December 2018, at the hands of Vice President of India Shree Venkaiah Naidu.
- Featured in "The light within A Different Vision of Life" by Sipra Das ISBN 9789381523629
- Featured in ‘Nazar ya Nazariya’ National tele-serial by Eye way, and ‘Yeh Hai Raushni ka Karvan’ a National Radio Serial by Score Foundation.
- "Outstanding Sportsman Special Award" Awarded by IBSA (Indian Blind Sports Association) New Delhi on 10 Jan. 2012.
- "ASPIRE Talent Award 2009" Awarded by H.R.D. Minister Shri Kapil Sibble at Gurgaon (New Delhi) on 27 Aug. 2009.
- EKLAVYA KRIDA PURASKAR 2008, Awarded by Govt. of Maharashtra State (at the hand of Governor of Maharashtra Shri Jamir) On 2 Aug. 2009
- "Neelam Kanga Award 2009" Awarded at Mumbai by Dy. Chief Minister Shri Chhagan Bhujbal on 19 Jan. 2009.
- Krida Ratna Purskar 2006, Awarded by Commissioner, Amravati Municipal Corporation, Amravati on 29 March 2006.
- AIASHA Jagatik Kartrutwan Mahila Purskar 2005, Awarded by All India Stri Heeth Association, Mumbai.
- March 2004 'Parakh Khel Ratna Purskar' Awarded by Parakh Samaj Kalyan Sanstha, Nagpur.
- 26 January 2003 Awarded by Vilasrao Balkrushna Patil, Minister Maharashtra state & Palak Mantri.
