= Gael Adam =

Mauritian swimmer (born 1986)

Personal information
- Full name: Sebastien Gael Adam
- National team: Mauritius
- Born: 28 March 1986 (age 40) Beau Bassin, Mauritius
- Height: 1.82 m (6 ft 0 in)
- Weight: 80 kg (176 lb)

Sport
- Sport: Swimming
- Strokes: Freestyle
- Club: CN Brest (FRA)

Sebastien Gael Adam (born March 28, 1986, in Beau Bassin) is a Mauritian swimmer who specializes in freestyle events. He represented his nation Mauritius at the 2008 Summer Olympics, placing himself among the top 60 swimmers in the 100 m freestyle. During his sporting career, Adam trained full-time at Brest Swimming Club in France.

Adam was invited by FINA to compete for Mauritius in the men's 100 m freestyle at the 2008 Summer Olympics in Beijing. Swimming in heat two, he chased Fiji's five-time Olympian Carl Probert on the final stretch to hit the wall in third place and fifty-seventh overall by a close, 0.02-second margin with a time of 52.35 seconds.
