= Matthew Rose (swimmer) =

Canadian swimmer

Personal information
- Full name: Matthew Rose
- Nickname: "Matt"
- National team: Canada
- Born: July 10, 1981 (age 44) Lindsay, Ontario
- Height: 1.88 m (6 ft 2 in)
- Weight: 80 kg (176 lb)

Sport
- Sport: Swimming
- Strokes: Backstroke, freestyle
- Club: Trent Swim Club
- College team: Texas A&M University
Medal record
Men's swimming
Representing Canada
Pan Pacific Swimming Championships
Silver medal – second place	2006 Victoria	4x100 m freestyle
Commonwealth Games
Bronze medal – third place	2002 Manchester	4x100 m freestyle
Pan American Games
Bronze medal – third place	2003 Santo Domingo	4x100 m freestyle

Matthew Rose (born July 10, 1981) is a Canadian former competition swimmer and national record-holder. He swam for Canada at the 2004 Summer Olympics in Athens.

He attended Texas A&M University in College Station, Texas, where he swam for the Texas A&M Aggies swimming and diving team. He was named the Big 12 Conference's Swimmer of the Year at the 2003 conference meet.

In November 2003, Rose became the first Canadian under 22 seconds in the short-course 50m freestyle, when he clocked a 21.95 at a meet at Texas A&M to set the Canadian Record.

An extended bio of Rose is available via Pacific Canadian Sport Centre's website Athlete Bios section.

== See also ==
- List of Commonwealth Games medallists in swimming (men)
