= Jersey at the 2006 Commonwealth Games =

Sporting event delegation

Flag of Jersey

The British Crown dependency of Jersey was represented in the 2006 Commonwealth Games in Melbourne by a 35-member contingent, comprising 35 sportspersons and no officials. They competed in 7 sports, including athletics, badminton, cycling, lawn bowls, shooting, swimming, and triathlon. They won no medals.

== Medals ==
	(gold)	(silver)	(bronze)	Total
Jersey	0	0	0	0

== Jersey's Commonwealth Games Team 2006 ==
=== Athletics ===
- Simon Phelan – High Jump
- Lauren Therin – Javelin and Discus

=== Badminton ===
- Lucy Jane Burns – Doubles/Mixed
- Elizabeth Cann – Singles
- Gavin Carter – singles, Doubles
- Clive Dunford – singles, doubles, Mixed
- Solenn Pasturel – Singles & Doubles

=== Cycling ===
- Sam Firby – Time Trial & Road Race

=== Lawn bowls ===
- Katrina Bisson – singles
- Derek Boswell – pairs
- Suzanne Dingle – pairs
- Christine Grimes – triples
- Gina De Long – triples
- John James Lowery
- Angus McKinnon – singles
- Lee Nixon
- Gean O'Neil – triples
- Allan Quemard
- Alan Shaw – triples
- Gaynor Thomaa – pairs

=== Shooting ===
- Richard Benest
- Kevin De Gruchy
- Marcus Hill
- Stephen Le Couillard
- David Le Quesne
- David Jonathan Turner
- David Leslie Ward

=== Swimming ===
- Liam Edward Du Feu – 100 m freestyle, 200 m freestyle
- Daniel Halksworth – 200 m IM, 400 m IM
- Simon Le Couillard – 50 m, 100 m, 200 m fly
- Alexis Patrick Militis – 100 m 50 m freestyle

=== Triathlon ===
- Paul Clements
- Scott Pitcher
- Timothy Rogers
