= Bryan Tay =

Singaporean swimmer

Personal information
- Full name: Tay Zhi Rong
- Nationality: Singapore
- Born: 13 April 1988 (age 38) Singapore
- Height: 1.84 m (6 ft 0 in)
- Weight: 75 kg (165 lb)

Sport
- Sport: Swimming
- Event: Freestyle
- College team: Princeton University
- Club: APSC Singapore
- Team: Li Jinxiao (SIN)
Medal record
Men's swimming
Representing Singapore
Southeast Asian Games
Gold medal – first place	2005 Manila	4×100 m freestyle
Gold medal – first place	2005 Manila	4×200 m freestyle
Gold medal – first place	2007 Bangkok	100 m freestyle
Gold medal – first place	2007 Bangkok	4×100 m freestyle
Gold medal – first place	2007 Bangkok	4×200 m freestyle
Bronze medal – third place	2005 Manila	100 m freestyle
Bronze medal – third place	2005 Manila	200 m freestyle

Bryan Tay Zhi Rong (born 13 April 1988) is a Singaporean swimmer, who specialized in individual and relay freestyle events and represented Singapore in the 2008 Beijing Olympics. He is also a multiple-time medalist for the individual events, and a two-time defending champion for the relay freestyle events at the Southeast Asian Games.

== Olympics ==
Tay was the sole male swimmer for the Singapore national team at the 2008 Summer Olympics in Beijing, and competed for the men's 200 m freestyle. He won the second heat of the competition, and set a national record, with a time of 1:50.41, 0.86 seconds ahead of Estonia's Vladimir Sidorkin. Tay, however, failed to advance into the semi-final rounds, as he placed forty-first in the overall rankings.

Tay was also a varsity member of the Princeton Tigers swimming team at Princeton University under Head Coach C. Rob Orr.

Tay is currently the country manager for Lendela Singapore, a loan matching platform that matches borrowers with personalized loan offers from multiple banks and loan providers.

== See also ==
- List of Princeton University Olympians
