= Boxing at the 2006 Commonwealth Games =

Boxing competitions

- Venue: Melbourne Exhibition Centre
- Location: Melbourne, Australia
- Dates: 15 to 26 March 2006

Boxing at the 2006 Commonwealth Games was the 18th appearance of the Boxing at the Commonwealth Games. The events were held in Melbourne, Australia, from 15 to 26 March 2006 and featured contests in eleven weight classes. It was one of two male-only sports at the Commonwealth Games, the other being Rugby Sevens.

The boxing events were held at the Melbourne Exhibition Centre. The weight categories changed slightly with only 11 classes instead of 12 and the weights themselves were increased slightly, with light-welterweight switching from 63.5 to 64 kg, the welterweight changing from 67 to 69 kg and the light middleweight event being dropped completely.

England topped the boxing medal table by virtue of winning five gold medals.

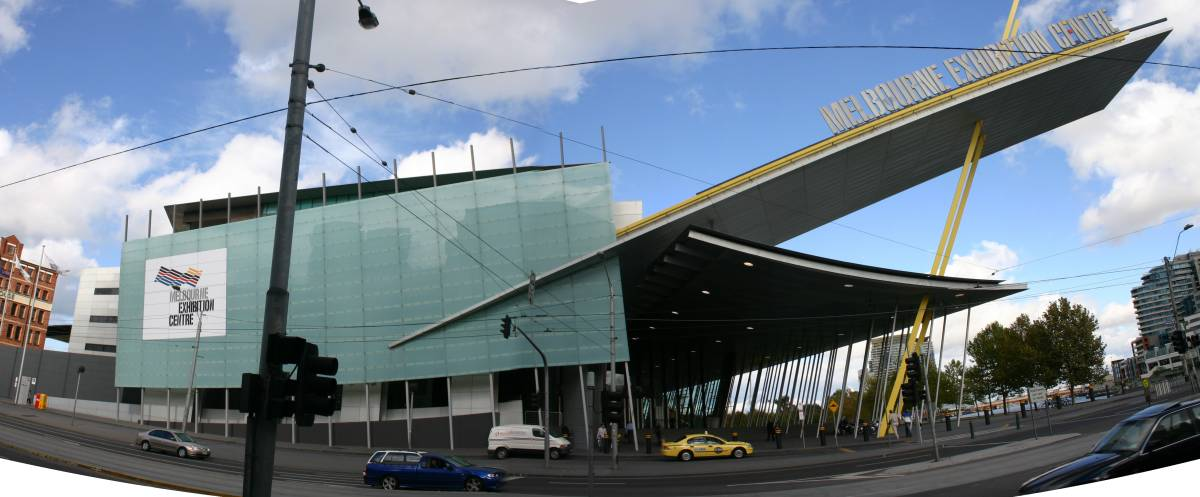
Melbourne Exhibition Centre

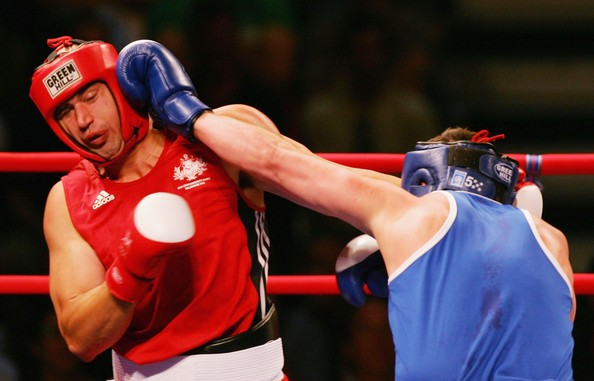
Steven Rudic (red) loses to Kevin Evans in the super-heavyweight semi-final

== Medal table ==
* Host nation (Australia)

Rank	Nation	Gold	Silver	Bronze	Total
1	England (ENG)	5	1	2	8
2	Australia (AUS)*	2	0	4	6
3	India (IND)	1	2	2	5
4	South Africa (SAF)	1	1	0	2
5	Namibia (NAM)	1	0	0	1
5	Scotland (SCO)	1	0	0	1
7	Mauritius (MRI)	0	2	0	2
8	Wales (WAL)	0	1	3	4
9	Nigeria (NGR)	0	1	2	3
10	Canada (CAN)	0	1	0	1
10	Lesotho	0	1	0	1
10	Pakistan (PAK)	0	1	0	1
13	Kenya (KEN)	0	0	3	3
14	Barbados (BAR)	0	0	1	1
14	Botswana (BOT)	0	0	1	1
14	Ghana (GHA)	0	0	1	1
14	Samoa (SAM)	0	0	1	1
14	Swaziland (SWZ)	0	0	1	1
14	Uganda (UGA)	0	0	1	1
Totals (19 entries)		11	11	22	44

== Medallists ==
Event	Gold	Silver	Bronze
Light flyweight 48 kg	Japhet Uutoni; Namibia	Darran Langley; England	Simanga Shiba; Swaziland
Light flyweight 48 kg	Japhet Uutoni; Namibia	Darran Langley; England	Mo Nasir; Wales
Flyweight 51 kg	Don Broadhurst; England	Jackson Chauke; South Africa	Jitender Kumar; India
Flyweight 51 kg	Don Broadhurst; England	Jackson Chauke; South Africa	Martin Mubiru; Uganda
Bantamweight 54 kg	Akhil Kumar; India	Bruno Julie; Mauritius	Nestor Bolum; Nigeria
Bantamweight 54 kg	Akhil Kumar; India	Bruno Julie; Mauritius	Mmoloki Nogeng; Botswana
Featherweight 57 kg	Stephen Smith; England	Mehrullah Lassi; Pakistan	Luke Jackson; Australia
Featherweight 57 kg	Stephen Smith; England	Mehrullah Lassi; Pakistan	Darren Edwards; Wales
Lightweight 60 kg	Frankie Gavin; England	Giovanni Frontin; Mauritius	Charles Menya; Kenya
Lightweight 60 kg	Frankie Gavin; England	Giovanni Frontin; Mauritius	Lenny Zappavigna; Australia
Light welterweight 64 kg	James Russan; England	Moses Kopo; Lesotho	Jamie Crees; Wales
Light welterweight 64 kg	James Russan; England	Moses Kopo; Lesotho	Black Mathenge; Kenya
Welterweight 69 kg	Bongani Mwelase; South Africa	Vijender Singh; India	Neil Perkins; England
Welterweight 69 kg	Bongani Mwelase; South Africa	Vijender Singh; India	Olufemi Ajayi; Nigeria
Middleweight 75 kg	Jarrod Fletcher; Australia	Adonis Stevenson; Canada	Warren Fuavailili; Samoa
Middleweight 75 kg	Jarrod Fletcher; Australia	Adonis Stevenson; Canada	James DeGale; England
Light heavyweight 81 kg	Kenny Anderson; Scotland	Adura Olalehin; Nigeria	Joshua Ndere; Kenya
Light heavyweight 81 kg	Kenny Anderson; Scotland	Adura Olalehin; Nigeria	Benjamin McEachran; Australia
Heavyweight 91 kg	Brad Pitt; Australia	Harpreet Singh; India	Awusone Yekeni; Ghana
Heavyweight 91 kg	Brad Pitt; Australia	Harpreet Singh; India	Fitzgerald Emmanuel; Barbados
Super heavyweight +91 kg	David Price; England	Kevin Evans; Wales	Steven Rudic; Australia
Super heavyweight +91 kg	David Price; England	Kevin Evans; Wales	Varghese Johnson; India

== Results ==
=== Light Flyweight 48 kg ===
Round	Winner	Loser	Score
Extra preliminary	(Pakistan) Muhammad Nisar	(Cameroon) Thomas Essomba	40:20
Extra preliminary	(Ghana) Manyo Plange	(Tanzania) Omari Kimweri	RSCO 2
Extra preliminary	(Wales) Mo Nasir	(Kenya) Peter Mungai Warui	22:17
Preliminary	(Northern Ireland) Paddy Barnes	(Botswana) Michael Rantsho	RSCO 2
Preliminary	(Eswatini) Simanga Shiba	(Zambia) Cassius Chiyanika	32:16
Preliminary	(Papua New Guinea) Jack Willie	(Trinidad and Tobago) Aaron Cumberbatch	31:15
Preliminary	(Namibia) Japhet Uutoni	(Nigeria) Lukumon Akinolugabde	33:10
Preliminary	(Malaysia) Zamzadi Azizi Bin Mohd	(Australia) Romesh Fernando	28:13
Preliminary	(England) Darran Langley	(India) Suranjoy Singh	20:12
Preliminary	(Pakistan) Muhammad Nisar	(Sri Lanka) T.M.C.Tennakoon	37:20
Preliminary	(Wales) Mo Nasir	(Ghana) Manyo Plange	27:12
Quarter-Final	(Eswatini) Simanga Shiba	(Northern Ireland) Paddy Barnes	37:34
Quarter-Final	(Namibia) Japhet Uutoni	(Papua New Guinea) Jack Willie	RSC 2
Quarter-Final	(England) Darran Langley	(Malaysia) Zamzadi Azizi Bin Mohd	26:23
Quarter-Final	(Wales) Mo Nasir	(Pakistan) Muhammad Nisar	30:15
Semi-Final	(Namibia) Japhet Uutoni	(Eswatini) Simanga Shiba	34:16
Semi-Final	(England) Darran Langley	(Wales) Mo Nasir	19:13

Gold Medal Bout 221

Corner	Country	Name	Results
Red	(Namibia) NAM	Japhet Uutoni	Red
Blue	(England) ENG	Darran Langley	PTS 37 : 24

Scores	Red	Blue
Round 1	4	8
Round 2	10	4
Round 3	13	6
Round 4	10	6

=== Flyweight 51 kg ===
Round	Winner	Loser	Score
Extra preliminary	(Lesotho) Meshack Letsoepa	(Sierra Leone) Alie Kargbo	23:8
Extra preliminary	(India) Jitender Kumar	(Pakistan) Karim Nouman	24:17
Extra preliminary	(Zambia) Kennedy Kanyanta	(Wales) Chris Jenkins	27:6
Extra preliminary	(Botswana) Lechedzani Luza	(Namibia) Paulus Ambunda	
Preliminary	(Kenya) Duncan Murai Kuria	(Nigeria) Saheed Olawale	RSCO 3
Preliminary	(Uganda) Martin Mubiru	(Solomon Islands) Benedict Telovae	RSC 1
Preliminary	(Guyana) Dexter Marques	(Canada) Dominic Longpre	32:18
Preliminary	(South Africa) Jackson Chauke	(Sri Lanka) Jayantha Kumara H.P.L.	28:17
Preliminary	(England) Don Broadhurst	(Australia) Bradley Hore	26:18
Preliminary	(Northern Ireland) Ryan Lindberg	(Ghana) Emmanuel Addo	RSCO 2
Preliminary	(India) Jitender Kumar	(Lesotho) Meshack Letsoepa	26:12
Preliminary	(Botswana) Lechedzani Luza	(Zambia) Kennedy Kanyanta	19:10
Quarter-Final	(Uganda) Martin Mubiru	(Kenya) Duncan Murai Kuria	26:16
Quarter-Final	(South Africa) Jackson Chauke	(Guyana) Dexter Marques	27:11
Quarter-Final	(England) Don Broadhurst	(Northern Ireland) Ryan Lindberg	36:27
Quarter-Final	(India) Jitender Kumar	(Botswana) Lechedzani Luza	17:15

Semifinal Bout 194

Corner	Country	Name	Results
Red	(Uganda) UGA	Martin Mubiru	Blue
Blue	(South Africa) RSA	Jackson Chauke	PTS 22 : 24

Scores	Red	Blue
Round 1	2	3
Round 2	6	9
Round 3	9	6
Round 4	5	6

Semifinal Bout 195

Corner	Country	Name	Results
Red	(England) ENG	Don Broadhurst	Red
Blue	(India) IND	Jitender Kumar	PTS 31 : 26

Scores	Red	Blue
Round 1	5	5
Round 2	5	5
Round 3	13	8
Round 4	8	8

Gold Medal Bout 216

Corner	Country	Name	Results
Red	(South Africa) RSA	Jackson Chauke	Blue
Blue	(England) ENG	Don Broadhurst	RSCOS R3 01:28

Scores	Red	Blue
Round 1	1	4
Round 2	3	10
Round 3	1	11

=== Bantamweight 54kg ===
Round	Winner	Loser	Score
Extra preliminary	(Canada) Isho Shiba	(Tanzania) Emilian Polino	RSC 2
Extra preliminary	(Wales) Matthew Edmonds	(Trinidad and Tobago) Leroy Isidore	RSCO 3
Extra preliminary	(Mauritius) Bruno Julie	(Namibia) Immanuel Naidjala	26:10
Extra preliminary	(Pakistan) Abid Ali	(Fiji) Gyanandra Kumar	17:5
Extra preliminary	(Botswana) Mmoloki Nogeng	(Northern Ireland) Shaun McKim	28:23
Extra preliminary	(Ghana) Prince Dzanie	(Papua New Guinea) Paul Lare	37:19
Extra preliminary	(Lesotho) Thabiso Nketu	(Kenya) Sammy Magima	RSCI 4
Extra preliminary	(Sri Lanka) Manju Wanjarachchi	(Australia) Nathan Di Carlo	21:15
Preliminary	(Nigeria) Nestor Bolum	(Eswatini) Thokozani Masuku	24:11
Preliminary	(Cameroon) Eric Anaba	(Barbados) Bradley Redman	RSCI 3
Preliminary	(India) Akhil Kumar	(Uganda) Atanas Mugerwa	RSCO 3
Preliminary	(South Africa) Bongani Mahlangu	(England) Nicholas McDonald	19:11
Preliminary	(Wales) Matthew Edmonds	(Canada) Isho Shiba	26:21
Preliminary	(Mauritius) Bruno Julie	(Pakistan) Abid Ali	27:13
Preliminary	(Botswana) Mmoloki Nogeng	(Ghana) Prince Dzanie	33:31
Preliminary	(Lesotho) Thabiso Nketu	(Sri Lanka) Manju Wanjarachchi	21:13
Quarter-Final	(Nigeria) Nestor Bolum	(Cameroon) Eric Anaba	RSCO 3
Quarter-Final	(India) Akhil Kumar	(South Africa) Bongani Mahlangu	34:20
Quarter-Final	(Mauritius) Bruno Julie	(Wales) Matthew Edmonds	21:8
Quarter-Final	(Botswana) Mmoloki Nogeng	(Lesotho) Thabiso Nketu	34:23
Semi-Final	(India) Akhil Kumar	(Nigeria) Nestor Bolum	26:24
Semi-Final	(Mauritius) Bruno Julie	(Botswana) Mmoloki Nogeng	21:10

Gold Medal Bout 222

Corner	Country	Name	Results
Red	(India) IND	Akhil Kumar	Red
Blue	(Mauritius) MRI	Bruno Julie	PTS 20 : 12

Scores	Red	Blue
Round 1	6	0
Round 2	5	4
Round 3	6	4
Round 4	3	4

=== Featherweight 57 kg ===
Round	Winner	Loser	Score
Extra preliminary	(Australia) Luke Jackson	(Namibia) Gottlieb Ndokosho	17:9
Extra preliminary	(Jamaica) Nicholas Walters	(Trinidad and Tobago) Christopher DeFreitas	23:6
Extra preliminary	(Pakistan) Lassi Mehrullah	(Sri Lanka) Kamal Sammeera	22:8
Extra preliminary	(Canada) Arash Usmanee	(Tanzania) Petro Mtagwa	25:9
Extra preliminary	(Scotland) Jason Hastie	(Lesotho) Stanley Tsenoli	9:2
Extra preliminary	(Mauritius) Richarno Colin	(New Zealand) Jamie Gardner	28:12
Preliminary	(Malaysia) Eddy Kalai	(Nigeria) Danladi Yakubu	RSCO 3
Preliminary	(Wales) Darren Edwards	(Botswana) Thato Batshegi	33:22
Preliminary	(England) Stephen Smith	(Ghana) Samuel Neequaye	RSCO 3
Preliminary	(India) Diwakar Prasad	(Fiji) Metuisela Coriakula	RSCO 2
Preliminary	(Uganda) Sharif Bogere	(South Africa) Ashley Dlamini	51:33
Preliminary	(Australia) Luke Jackson	(Jamaica) Nicholas Walters	12:5
Preliminary	(Pakistan) Lassi Mehrullah	(Canada) Arash Usmanee	38:20
Preliminary	(Scotland) Jason Hastie	(Mauritius) Richarno Colin	11:7
Quarter-Final	(Wales) Darren Edwards	(Malaysia) Eddy Kalai	36:14
Quarter-Final	(England) Stephen Smith	(India) Diwakar Prasad	AB 3
Quarter-Final	(Australia) Luke Jackson	(Uganda) Sharif Bogere	18:12
Quarter-Final	(Pakistan) Lassi Mehrullah	(Scotland) Jason Hastie	25:11
Semi-Final	(England) Stephen Smith	(Wales) Darren Edwards	29:15
Semi-Final	(Pakistan) Lassi Mehrullah	(Australia) Luke Jackson	20:13

Gold Medal Bout 217

Corner	Country	Name	Results
Red	(England) ENG	Stephen Smith	Red
Blue	(Pakistan) PAK	Mehrullah Lassi	PTS 20 : 10

Scores	Red	Blue
Round 1	6	2
Round 2	7	4
Round 3	4	2
Round 4	3	2

=== Lightweight 60kg ===
Round	Winner	Loser	Score
Extra preliminary	(Malaysia) Paunandes Bin Paulus	(The Bahamas) Levan Stewart	25:13
Extra preliminary	(Pakistan) Asghar Ali Shah	(Samoa) Sada Wulf	26:9
Extra preliminary	(Namibia) Jatoorora Tjingaveta	(Lesotho) Macheli Letuka	34:22
Extra preliminary	(Mauritius) Giovanni Frontin	(Ghana) Mohamed Ayi Bruce	RSCO 3
Extra preliminary	(Tanzania) Karimu Matumla	(Sri Lanka) Upali Bandara R.M.	22:21
Extra preliminary	(Mozambique) Herberto Mabombo	(South Africa) Thanduxolo Dyani	RSCH 2
Extra preliminary	(Botswana) Gomotsang Gaasite	(Sierra Leone) Gibrilla Kanu	25:15
Extra preliminary	(Australia) Lenny Zappavigna	(Scotland) Mitch Prince	33:13
Extra preliminary	(Nigeria) Rasheed Lawal	(Fiji) Sepeti Qio	RSC 3
Extra preliminary	(Canada) Ibrahim Kamal	(Papua New Guinea) Rickson Yamo	RSCO 3
Extra preliminary	(England) Frankie Gavin	(Cyprus) Ovidiu Bobîrnat	16:5
Extra preliminary	(India) Jai Bhagwan	(Wales) Robert Turley	30:9
Premliminary	(Kenya) Charles Menya	(Trinidad and Tobago) Joel Anthony Eligon	RSC 2
Premliminary	(Cameroon) Colomban Kaldjob	(Zambia) Hastings Bwalya	31:23
Premliminary	(Pakistan) Asghar Ali Shah	(Malaysia) Paunandes Bin Paulus	25:11
Premliminary	(Mauritius) Giovanni Frontin	(Namibia) Jatoorora Tjingaveta	24:5
Premliminary	(Tanzania) Karimu Matumla	(Mozambique) Herberto Mabombo	42:24
Premliminary	(Australia) Lenny Zappavigna	(Botswana) Gomotsang Gaasite	34:15
Premliminary	(Nigeria) Rasheed Lawal	(Canada) Ibrahim Kama	15:14
Premliminary	(England) Frankie Gavin	(India) Jai Bhagwan	20:8
Quarter-Final	(Kenya) Charles Menya	(Cameroon) Colomban Kaldjob	24:8
Quarter-Final	(Mauritius) Giovanni Frontin	(Pakistan) Asghar Ali Shah	23:11
Quarter-Final	(Australia) Lenny Zappavigna	(Tanzania) Karimu Matumla	RSCO 2
Quarter-Final	(England) Frankie Gavin	(Nigeria) Rasheed Lawal	RSCO 3
Semi-Final	(Mauritius) Giovanni Frontin	(Kenya) Charles Menya	19:4
Semi-Final	(England) Frankie Gavin	(Australia) Lenny Zappavigna	RSCO 3

Gold Medal Bout 223

Corner	Country	Name	Results
Red	(Mauritius) MRI	Giovanni Frontin	Blue
Blue	(England) ENG	Frankie Gavin	PTS 9 : 23

Scores	Red	Blue
Round 1	1	10
Round 2	2	6
Round 3	4	4
Round 4	2	3

=== Light Welterweight 64 kg ===
Round	Winner	Loser	Score
Extra Preliminary	(Scotland) Mark Hastie	(Samoa) Leti Leti	39:31
Extra Preliminary	(South Africa) Goodman Zanempi	(Trinidad and Tobago) Aaron Hassette	RSC 2
Extra Preliminary	(Lesotho) Moses Kopo	(Ghana) Bastir Samir	34:27
Extra Preliminary	(Zambia) Precious Makina	(Cook Islands) Tutai Williams	w/o
Extra Preliminary	(Canada) Kevin Bizier	(Uganda) Edward Akora	26:10
Extra Preliminary	(Australia) Todd Kidd	(India) Bahadur Pun	31:19
Extra Preliminary	(Botswana) Herbert Nkabiti	(Cameroon) Cessaire Rivan	+19:19
Extra Preliminary	(England) James Russan	(Cyprus) Ionas Christodoulou	22:10
Extra Preliminary	(Papua New Guinea) Chavis Kora	(The Gambia) Ebou Saine	RSCO 2
Extra Preliminary	(Nigeria) Chukwudi Nwaiwu	(Grenada) Jewel Lewis	27:6
Extra Preliminary	(Wales) Jamie Crees	(The Bahamas) Carl Heild	26:9
Extra Preliminary	(Northern Ireland) Dermot Hamill	(Tanzania) Hasim Simon Petro	16:3
Preliminary	(New Zealand) Carl Commons	(Malawi) Osgood Kayuni	29:22
Preliminary	(Kenya) Black Moses Mathenge	(Namibia) Mujandjae Kasuto	29:14
Preliminary	(Scotland) Mark Hastie	(South Africa) Goodman Zanempi	27:18
Preliminary	(Lesotho) Moses Kopo	(Zambia) Precious Makina	31:19
Preliminary	(Australia) Todd Kidd	(Canada) Kevin Bizier	30:13
Preliminary	(England) James Russan	(Botswana) Herbert Nkabiti	RSC 2
Preliminary	(Nigeria) Chukwudi Nwaiwu	(Papua New Guinea) Chavis Kora	19:5
Preliminary	(Wales) Jamie Crees	(Northern Ireland) Dermot Hamill	22:21
Quarter-Final	(Kenya) Black Moses Mathenge	(New Zealand) Carl Commons	29:18
Quarter-Final	(Lesotho) Moses Kopo	(Scotland) Mark Hastie	RSCI 4
Quarter-Final	(England) James Russan	(Australia) Todd Kidd	33:26
Quarter-Final	(Wales) Jamie Crees	(Nigeria) Chukwudi Nwaiwu	34:22
Semi-Final	(Lesotho) Moses Kopo	(Kenya) Black Moses Mathenge	28:12
Semi-Final	(England) James Russan	(Wales) Jamie Crees	AB 1

Gold Medal Bout 218

Corner	Country	Name	Results
Red	(Lesotho) LES	Moses Kopo	Blue
Blue	(England) ENG	James Russan	WO R1 00:00

Scores	Red	Blue
Round 1	0	0

=== Welterweight 69kg ===
Round	Winner	Loser	Score
Extra preliminary	(Nigeria) Olufemi Ajayi	(Namibia) Johannes Mwetupunga	RSC 2
Extra preliminary	(Malawi) Fundo Mhura	(Wales) Aaron Thomas	23:17
Extra preliminary	(Eswatini) Musa Ngozo	(Cook Islands) Etu Daniel Puni Irorangi	w/o
Extra preliminary	(Cameroon) Serge Mvoue	(The Bahamas) Taureano Johnson	37:34
Extra preliminary	(India) Vijender Singh	(Samoa) Poleti Seipua	RSCO 3
Extra preliminary	(Seychelles) Alvyn Gabriel	(Dominica) Mervin Langton	16:8
Extra preliminary	(Lesotho) Thandi Ntjona	(Cyprus) Yuri Dabrinski	20:14
Extra preliminary	(Scotland) Kris Carslaw	(New Zealand) Joseph Blackbourn	34:28
Extra preliminary	(Northern Ireland) Thomas Hamill	(Zambia) Ellis Chibuye	26:24
Extra preliminary	(Kenya) Abdolom Okoth	(Trinidad and Tobago) Kirt Blackwell	RSCO 3
Extra preliminary	(Canada) Adam Trupish	(Sri Lanka) Samatha Kumara	RSCO 3
Extra preliminary	(England) Neil Perkins	(Ghana) Ahmed Saraku	13:7
Preliminary	(South Africa) Bongani Mwelase	(Australia) Gerard O'Mahony	RSC 4
Preliminary	(Botswana) Moabi Mothiba	(The Gambia) Mamadou Jammeh	RSC 1
Preliminary	(Nigeria) Olufemi Ajayi	(Malawi) Fundo Mhura	22:13
Preliminary	(Eswatini) Musa Ngozo	(Cameroon) Serge Mvoue	45:26
Preliminary	(India) Vijender Singh	(Seychelles) Alvyn Gabriel	25:11
Preliminary	(Scotland) Kris Carslaw	(Lesotho) Thandi Ntjona	23:11
Preliminary	(Northern Ireland) Thomas Hamill	(Kenya) Abdolom Okoth	RSCO 3
Preliminary	(England) Neil Perkins	(Canada) Adam Trupish	23:13
Quarter-Final	(South Africa) Bongani Mwelase	(Botswana) Moabi Mothiba	RSCO 2
Quarter-Final	(Nigeria) Olufemi Ajayi	(Eswatini) Musa Ngozo	37:32
Quarter-Final	(India) Vijender Singh	(Scotland) Kris Carslaw	RSCO 2
Quarter-Final	(England) Neil Perkins	(Northern Ireland) Thomas Hamill	36:19
Semi-Final	(South Africa) Bongani Mwelase	(Nigeria) Olufemi Ajayi	RSCO 3
Semi-Final	(India) Vijender Singh	(England) Neil Perkins	22:14

Gold Medal Bout 224

Corner	Country	Name	Results
Red	(South Africa) RSA	Bongani Mwelase	Red
Blue	(India) IND	Vijender Singh	PTS 33 : 26

Scores	Red	Blue
Round 1	4	4
Round 2	12	8
Round 3	8	9
Round 4	9	5

=== Middleweight 75 kg ===
Round	Winner	Loser	Score
Extra preliminary	(India) Parvinder Singh	(Cameroon) Charles E.Njock	8:3
Extra preliminary	(Scotland) Craig McEwan	(Tonga) Tevita Fonua	RSCO 3
Extra preliminary	(New Zealand) Kahukura Bentson	(Barbados) Junior Greenidge	RSC 1
Extra preliminary	(England) James DeGale	(Fiji) Tomasi Naivaqa	RSC 1
Extra preliminary	(Trinidad and Tobago) Alexie Zola Alexander	(Sri Lanka) Fernando P.R.D.A.	21:14
Extra preliminary	(Kenya) Daniel Shishia	(Nigeria) Davidson Emenogu	+11:11
Preliminary	(Canada) Adonis Stevenson	(Guyana) Gordon Ross	RSC 4
Preliminary	(Malawi) Chimwemwe Chiotha	(South Africa) Sivuyile Dingiswayo	RSC 3
Preliminary	(Northern Ireland) Eamonn O'Kane	(Seychelles) Jovette Jean	25:16
Preliminary	(Samoa) Warren Fauvailili	(Papua New Guinea) John Korake	20:8
Preliminary	(Australia) Jarrod Fletcher	(Ghana) Sai Obodai	30:10
Preliminary	(Scotland) Craig McEwan	(India) Parvinder Singh	16:15
Preliminary	(England) James DeGale	(New Zealand) Kahukura Bentson	RSCO 2
Preliminary	(Kenya) Daniel Shishia	(Trinidad and Tobago) Alexie Zola Alexander	23:10
Quarter-Final	(Canada) Adonis Stevenson	(Malawi) Chimwemwe Chiotha	31:9
Quarter-Final	(Samoa) Warren Fauvailili	(Northern Ireland) Eamonn O'Kane	28:19
Quarter-Final	(Australia) Jarrod Fletcher	(Scotland) Craig McEwan	27:10
Quarter-Final	(England) James DeGale	(Kenya) Daniel Shishia	24:11
Semi-Final	(Canada) Adonis Stevenson	(Samoa) Warren Fauvailili	RSC 4
Semi-Final	(Australia) Jarrod Fletcher	(England) James DeGale	17:13

Gold Medal Bout 219

Corner	Country	Name	Results
Red	(Canada) CAN	Adonis Stevenson	Blue
Blue	(Australia) AUS	Jarrod Fletcher	PTS 18 : 34

Scores	Red	Blue
Round 1	5	8
Round 2	3	10
Round 3	5	8
Round 4	5	8

=== Light Heavyweight 81 kg ===
Round	Winner	Loser	Score
Extra preliminary	(Scotland) Kenny Anderson	(Papua New Guinea) Vincent Kora	KO 1
Extra preliminary	(South Africa) Tshepang Mohale	(Trinidad and Tobago) Denzel Salazar	30:12
Extra preliminary	(England) Tony Jeffries	(Samoa) Steve Wulf	RSCH 1
Preliminary	(Kenya) Joshua Ndere	(Barbados) Shawn Cox	RSCO 3
Preliminary	(India) Ajay Kumar	(Tonga) Mokai Paraha	22:16
Preliminary	(Ghana) Atoli Moore	(Cook Islands) Vengi Hagai	33:11
Preliminary	(Nigeria) Adura Olalehin	(Mozambique) Joao Ferreira	RSC 2
Preliminary	(Canada) Glenn Hunter	(New Zealand) Soulan Pownceby	33:19
Preliminary	(Australia) Ben McEachran	(Jamaica) Omar Gavin	RSC 1
Preliminary	(Scotland) Kenny Anderson	(Northern Ireland) Ciaran Crossan	KO 2
Preliminary	(England) Tony Jeffries	(South Africa) Tshepang Mohale	RSC 2
Quarter-Final	(Kenya) Joshua Ndere	(India) Ajay Kumar	18:10
Quarter-Final	(Nigeria) Adura Olalehin	(Ghana) Atoli Moore	RSCO 2
Quarter-Final	(Australia) Ben McEachran	(Canada) Glenn Hunter	33:15
Quarter-Final	(Scotland) Kenny Anderson	(England) Tony Jeffries	17:12
Semi-Final	(Nigeria) Adura Olalehin	(Kenya) Joshua Ndere	29:9
Semi-Final	(Scotland) Kenny Anderson	(Australia) Ben McEachran	RSCO

Gold Medal Bout 225

Corner	Country	Name	Results
Red	(Nigeria) NGR	Adura Blue Olalehin	Blue
Blue	(Scotland) SCO	Kenny Anderson	PTS 19 : 23

Scores	Red	Blue
Round 1	8	3
Round 2	5	4
Round 3	2	5
Round 4	4	11

=== Heavyweight 91 kg ===
Round	Winner	Loser	Score
Preliminary	(India) Harpreet Singh	(South Africa) Sean Santana	RSC 4
Preliminary	(Australia) Brad Pitt	(England) Danny Price	16:12
Preliminary	(Kenya) James Onyango Wasao	(Niue) Haleonehetou Togia Atutolu	RSCO 2
Preliminary	(Ghana) Awusone Yekeni	(Nigeria) Emmanuel Izonritei	14:12
Preliminary	(Scotland) Stephen Simmons	(Canada) Gino Nardari	15:10
Quarter-Final	(Barbados) Anderson Emmanuel	(Tonga) Kisione Mahanga	19:14
Quarter-Final	(India) Harpreet Singh	(Fiji) Navitalai Tawake Cagiloaloa	RSCO 3
Quarter-Final	(Australia) Brad Pitt	(Kenya) James Onyango Wasao	RSCO 2
Quarter-Final	(Ghana) Awusone Yekeni	(Scotland) Stephen Simmons	32:19
Semi-Final	(India) Harpreet Singh	(Barbados) Anderson Emmanuel	KO 1
Semi-Final	(Australia) Brad Pitt	(Ghana) Awusone Yekeni	25:13

Gold Medal Bout 220

Corner	Country	Name	Results
Red	(India) IND	Harpreet Singh	Blue
Blue	(Australia) AUS	Brad Pitt	PTS 10 : 25

Scores	Red	Blue
Round 1	1	6
Round 2	2	5
Round 3	2	7
Round 4	5	7

=== Super Heavyweight +91 kg ===
Round	Winner	Loser	Score
Preliminary	(Wales) Kevin Evans	(Canada) Robert Earl Montgomery	31:19
Preliminary	(Ghana) Haruna Osumanu	(Niue) Star Tauasi	15:14
Preliminary	(India) Varghese Johnson	(Kenya) Frederick Orieyo	RSC 1
Preliminary	(Seychelles) Patrick Camille	(Nigeria) Olanrewaju Durodola	+29:29
Preliminary	(England) David Price	(Fiji) Taraiasi Rasaubale	RSC 1
Preliminary	(New Zealand) Greg Weenink	(Samoa) Niko Vaega	18:9
Quarter-Final	(Australia) Steven Rudic	(Tonga) Isekeli Maama	RSCO 3
Quarter-Final	(Wales) Kevin Evans	(Ghana) Haruna Osumanu	RSCO 3
Quarter-Final	(India) Varghese Johnson	(Seychelles) Patrick Camille	RSC 3
Quarter-Final	(England) David Price	(New Zealand) Greg Weenink	RSC 2
Semi-Final	(Wales) Kevin Evans	(Australia) Steven Rudic	RSCO 3
Semi-Final	(England) David Price	(India) Varghese Johnson	RSC 4

Gold Medal Bout 226

Corner	Country	Name	Results
Red	(Wales) WAL	Kevin Evans	Blue
Blue	(England) ENG	David Price	RSCOS R3 01:09

Scores	Red	Blue
Round 1	1	6
Round 2	3	10
Round 3	5	13
