= Mubiru =

Mubiru is a surname. Notable people with the surname include:

- Alex Mubiru, Ugandan economist
- Dan Mubiru (born 1976), Ugandan footballer
- Hassan Mubiru (born 1978), Ugandan footballer
- Martin Mubiru (born 1984), Ugandan boxer
- Roy Mubiru (born 1977), Ugandan powerlifter
