= Mauritius at the Commonwealth Games =

- CG code: MRI
- CGA: Mauritius Olympic Committee
- Website: mauritiusolympic.org/en
- Medals Ranked 39th: Gold 2 Silver 11 Bronze 9 Total 22

Commonwealth Games appearances (overview)
- 1958; 1962; 1966; 1970; 1974; 1978; 1982; 1986; 1990; 1994; 1998; 2002; 2006; 2010; 2014; 2018; 2022; 2026; 2030

Mauritius has attended sixteen Commonwealth Games, beginning in 1958 and missing only the 1986 Games. They had not won a medal until 1998, when they won four, including a gold in boxing.

== Medals ==
Games	Gold	Silver	Bronze	Total
1958 Cardiff	0	0	0	0
1962 Perth	0	0	0	0
1966 Kingston	0	0	0	0
1970 Edinburgh	0	0	0	0
1974 Christchurch	0	0	0	0
1978 Edmonton	0	0	0	0
1982 Brisbane	0	0	0	0
1986 Edinburgh	did not attend			
1990 Auckland	0	0	0	0
1994 Victoria	0	0	0	0
1998 Kuala Lumpur	1	1	2	4
2002 Manchester	0	0	1	1
2006 Melbourne	0	3	0	3
2010 Delhi	0	0	2	2
2014 Glasgow	0	1	1	2
2018 Gold Coast	0	1	0	1
2022 Birmingham	0	3	2	5
2026 Glasgow	1	2	1	4
Total	2	11	9	22

== List of Medalists ==
Medal	Name	Games	Sport	Event
Bronze	Kersley Gardenne	1998 Kuala Lumpur	Athletics	Men's Pole Vault
Gold	Richard Sunee	1998 Kuala Lumpur	Boxing	Men's Flyweight
Silver	Michael Macaque	1998 Kuala Lumpur	Boxing	Men's Super Heavyweight
Bronze	Giovanni Frontin	1998 Kuala Lumpur	Boxing	Men's Lightweight
Bronze	Antonio Felicite	2002 Manchester	Judo	Men's 100 kg
Silver	Stéphan Buckland	2006 Melbourne	Athletics	Men's 200 Metres
Silver	Giovanni Frontin	2006 Melbourne	Boxing	Men's Lightweight
Silver	Bruno Julie	2006 Melbourne	Boxing	Men's Bantamweight
Bronze	Bruno Julie	2010 Delhi	Boxing	Men's Bantamweight
Bronze	Richarno Colin	2010 Delhi	Boxing	Men's Light Welterweight
Silver	Kennedy St Pierre	2014 Glasgow	Boxing	Men's Light Heavyweight
Bronze	Annabelle Laprovidence	2014 Glasgow	Judo	Women's 78 kg
Silver	Marie Ranaivosoa	2018 Gold Coast	Weightlifting	Women's 48 kg
Silver	Richarno Colin	2022 Birmingham	Boxing	Men's light welterweight
Silver	Remi Feuillet	2022 Birmingham	Judo	Men's 90kg
Silver	Roilya Ranaivosoa	2022 Birmingham	Weightlifting	Women's 49 kg
Bronze	Christianne Legentil	2022 Birmingham	Judo	Women's -57kg
Bronze	Sebastien Perrinne	2022 Birmingham	Judo	Men's +100kg
Gold	Rémi Feuillet	2026 Glasgow	Judo	Men's 90 kg
Silver	Noemi Alphonse	2026 Glasgow	Athletics	Women's 400 m T54
Silver	Noemi Alphonse	2026 Glasgow	Athletics	Women's 1500 m T54
Bronze	Merven Clair	2026 Glasgow	Boxing	Men's 70 kg
