= Kenny Anderson (boxer) =

Scottish boxer (born 1983)

Personal information
- Nickname: The Widowmaker
- Born: Kenneth John W. Anderson; 5 January 1983 (age 43) Edinburgh, Scotland
- Height: 1.82 m (6 ft 0 in)
- Weight: Super Middleweight

Boxing career
- Stance: Orthodox

Boxing record
- Total fights: 19
- Wins: 18
- Win by KO: 13
- Losses: 1
Medal record
Men's boxing
Representing Scotland
Commonwealth Games
Gold medal – first place	2006 Melbourne	Light Heavyweight

Kenneth John W. "Kenny" Anderson (born 5 January 1983) is a Scottish former professional boxer who competed from 2006 to 2012. At regional level, he held the Celtic super middleweight title in 2009 and the British super middleweight title in 2012. As an amateur he won a gold medal at the 2006 Commonwealth Games in the light-heavyweight division.

== Commonwealth Games ==
Hailing from Craigmillar in Scotland, he defeated five boxers, stopping three of them on the way to winning gold at Melbourne 2006. Anderson stopped his first two opponents, the first in just 30 sec the fastest stoppage recorded in the 2006 Commonwealth Games.

In the semifinal he defeated Englishman Tony Jeffries in what was billed as "The battle of Britain" Jeffries later won a bronze medal at the 2008 Olympics. After that bout Anderson spoke of his pride at being Scottish and how the win meant more as it was over an Englishman.

Anderson then fought Australian Ben McCraken the bout was stopped in the 2nd round on the 20-point rule, Anderson defeated Adura Olalehin of Nigeria (23-19) in the final of the 2006 Commonwealth Games. Anderson is the most successful amateur boxer bar Dick McTaggart MBE to come out of Scotland winning 8 international gold medals and a host of silver and bronze.

After those Games Anderson revealed he psyched himself up for his fights by watching Braveheart and reciting the Haka, the traditional Māori war dance which is performed by the New Zealand All Blacks rugby team before matches. He also stated his desire to remain an amateur and fight for Great Britain at the 2008 Olympic Games in Beijing, China.

== Professional career ==
Anderson turned pro in October 2006 and at present has a record of 19 fights 18 wins 13 by way of knockout. The sole loss came in a Commonwealth title fight which he had taken on 2 weeks notice against George Groves. In October 2012, Anderson won the British super middleweight title after stopping Robin Reid inside five rounds.

== Controversy ==
On 29 June 2009, Anderson appeared at Edinburgh Sheriff Court accused of attempted murder. It was alleged that Anderson had attacked a man in Edinburgh, punching him repeatedly in the head and striking him with a hammer. Anderson was found not guilty.

== Personal life ==
His sister is Olympic basketballer, Rose Anderson.
