= Yacine Fal =

Senegalese lawyer and corporate executive (born 1961)

- Born: 1961 (age 64–65); Senegal
- Education: University of Dakar (Bachelor of Laws) (Master of Laws); University of Paris X (Postgraduate Degree in International Law)
- Occupations: Lawyer & Corporate Executive
- Years active: 1998 — present
- Title: Acting Vice President, Regional Development, Integration and Business Delivery of the African Development Bank Group.

Yacine Fal is a Senegalese lawyer and corporate executive. Currently, she serves as the Acting Vice President at the African Development Bank Group (AfDB), responsible for "Regional Development, Integration and Business Delivery", effective 17 December 2021. Before that, from November 2020 until December 2021, she was the Director General in the Cabinet of the President of the AfDB.

== Background and education ==
She is a Senegalese national. She holds a Master of Laws degree, awarded by the University of Dakar. She also obtained a postgraduate degree in international law, from the University of Paris X.

== Work experience ==
Fal joined the AfDB in 1998, as the Principal Legal Counsel in the procurement unit of the bank, serving in that capacity for the next nine years. She then worked as the Manager of the Reform Implementation Team in the office of the President of the AfDB for one year, ending in 2008.

She was then appointed Officer Responsible for the Procurement and Fiduciary Services Department, serving there from 2010 until 2011. She was the Manager of the Procurement Services Division, from 2008 until 2013.

In 2014, she was posted to Rabat, Morocco, serving there as the Resident Representative of the AfDB's Morocco Office, for the next three years. In 2016, African Development Bank President appointed her Deputy Director General of the North Africa Business Development and Service Delivery Office. In November 2020, she was promoted to the position of Director General, in the Cabinet of the President of the AfDB, reporting directly to Akinwumi Adesina, the AfDB president.

== Other considerations ==
Fal lives and works in Abidjan, Ivory Coast, where the headquarters of AfDB are located. When she was appointed to the position of Acting Vice President of AfDB Responsible for Regional Development, Integration and Service Delivery, she was replaced as Director General of the Cabinet Office of the AfDB President, by Alex Mubiru, an economist from Uganda.
