= Lenny Zappavigna =

Australian boxer (born 1987)

Personal information
- Nickname: Zappa
- Born: 27 October 1987 (age 39) Sydney, Australia
- Height: 1.70 m (5 ft 7 in)
- Weight: Lightweight; Light-welterweight

Boxing career
- Reach: 175 cm (69 in)
- Stance: Orthodox

Boxing record
- Total fights: 42
- Wins: 38
- Win by KO: 28
- Losses: 4
Medal record
Men's amateur boxing
Representing Australia
Commonwealth Games
Bronze medal – third place	2006 Melbourne	Lightweight

Leonardo Zappavigna (born 27 October 1987) is an Australian professional boxer. He held the IBO lightweight title in 2010 and challenged for the IBF lightweight title in 2011. At regional level he held the IBO Asia Pacific lightweight and IBF Pan Pacific light-welterweight titles between 2008 and 2009 and the WBO Oriental light-welterweight title in 2014. As an amateur he won a bronze medal at the 2006 Commonwealth Games.
