= Mmoloki Nogeng =

Botswana boxer (born 1982)

Medal record

Men's boxing

Representing Botswana

Commonwealth Games
Bronze medal – third place	2006 Melbourne	Bantamweight

Mmoloki Nogeng (born May 30, 1982) is a boxer from Botswana. Nogeng won a bronze medal at the 2006 Commonwealth Games in Melbourne, Australia, losing to Mauritian boxer Bruno Julie in the semi-finals of the bantamweight (54 kg) category.

== Sources ==
- Statistics at official 2006 Commonwealth Games website
