= Bongani Mwelase =

South African boxer (born 1982)

Personal information
- Born: 23 August 1982 (age 43)

Sport
- Sport: Boxing
- Weight class: Welterweight
Medal record
Men's boxing
Representing South Africa
Commonwealth Games
Gold medal – first place	2006 Melbourne	Welterweight

Bongani Mwelase (born 23 August 1982) is a South African former boxer who became the 2006 Commonwealth amateur champion at welterweight.

== Amateur ==
The hard-punching southpaw failed to qualify for the 2004 Athens Games by ending up in third place at the 2nd AIBA African 2004 Olympic Qualifying Tournament in Gaborone, Botswana. He won the Commonwealth boxing championships in Glasgow 2005 and the Commonwealth Games 2006. In the final 2006 he beat Vijender Singh who received a standing 8 count 33–26. He is South Africa's first black Commonwealth boxing champion.

== Pro ==
He won his first 14 bouts and scored 12 KOs, but he then dropped decisions to Lovemore N'dou and Chris van Heerden in back-to-back fights.

He retired from boxing in 2011, citing exploitation and racism by promotors who mistreated black boxers. He finished his career with a record of 14–2.
