= Eswatini at the Commonwealth Games =

- CGF code: SWZ
- CGA: Eswatini Olympic and Commonwealth Games Association
- Website: eocga.org.sz
- Medals Ranked 54th: Gold 0 Silver 1 Bronze 3 Total 4

Commonwealth Games appearances (overview)
- 1970; 1974; 1978; 1982; 1986; 1990; 1994; 1998; 2002; 2006; 2010; 2014; 2018; 2022; 2026; 2030

Eswatini (previously known as Swaziland) has competed in thirteen Commonwealth Games, with their first attendance being in 1970. They have won four medals, three in boxing and one in athletics. Their first medal was a bronze medal in the men's marathon, won by Richard Mabuza in 1974.

== Medals ==
Games	Gold	Silver	Bronze	Total
1970 Edinburgh	0	0	0	0
1974 Christchurch	0	0	1	1
1978 Edmonton	0	0	0	0
1982 Brisbane	0	0	1	1
1986 Edinburgh	0	1	0	1
1990 Auckland	0	0	0	0
1994 Victoria	0	0	0	0
1998 Kuala Lumpur	0	0	0	0
2002 Manchester	0	0	0	0
2006 Melbourne	0	0	1	1
2010 Delhi	0	0	0	0
2014 Glasgow	0	0	0	0
2018 Gold Coast	0	0	0	0
2022 Birmingham	0	0	0	0
Total	0	1	3	4
