= Neil Perkins =

British boxer

Personal information
- Nationality: British (English)
- Born: 2 August 1979 (age 46)

Sport
- Sport: boxing
Medal record
Representing England
Men's Boxing
World Amateur Championships
Bronze medal – third place	2005 Mianyang	Welterweight
Commonwealth Games
Bronze medal – third place	2006 Melbourne	Welterweight
EU Amateur Championships
Silver medal – second place	2005 Cagliari	Welterweight
Bronze medal – third place	2004 Madrid	Welterweight

Neil Perkins (born 2 August 1979 is a British former amateur boxer who has won medals in international tournaments at welterweight.

== Career ==
Perkins was a southpaw and fought for Kirkdale ABC in Liverpool. He won the 2002 and 2003 Amateur Boxing Association British middleweight title. He failed to qualify for the 2004 Summer Olympics after ending up in third place at the 4th AIBA European 2004 Olympic Qualifying Tournament in Baku, Azerbaijan.

He won the 2005 World Amateur Boxing Championships bronze medal after beating Robert Blazo, local hero Ha Na, European silver medallist, Armenia's Samuel Matevosyan by 18 points but losing 33–21 in the semi-final to Belarusian Magomed Nurutdinov. In Melbourne 2006, he won the bronze again at the 2006 Commonwealth Games, after losing to Vijender Kumar 14:22 in the welterweight semi finals.

At the Euro 2006 he lost in the first round to Serbian Zoran Mitrovic 14:34. At the 2007 World Championships he again lost in the first round to Mitrovic. In 2010, he made a comeback at middleweight and was comprehensively beaten by Hosea Burton in the ABA championships.
