= Harpreet Singh (boxer) =

Indian boxer

Personal information
- Nationality: Indian
- Born: April 27, 1979 (age 47) Gangtok, Sikkim, India
- Height: 1.72 m (5 ft 8 in)
- Weight: 91 kg (201 lb)

Sport
- Sport: Boxing
- Weight class: Light heavyweight, Heavyweight
Medal record
Men's boxing
Representing India
Commonwealth Games
Silver medal – second place	2006 Melbourne	Heavyweight
Asian Championships
Bronze medal – third place	2002 Seremban	Light heavyweight

Harpreet Singh (Hindi: हरप्रीत सिंह, born April 27, 1979) is an Indian boxer.

== Career ==
Harpreet has won a silver medal in Men's Boxing Heavyweight 91 kg category at 2006 Commonwealth Games.
