= Uganda at the 2006 Commonwealth Games =

Sporting event delegation

- Flag of Uganda
- CGF code: UGA
- CGA: Commonwealth Games Association Uganda
- Website: nocuganda.org

in Melbourne, Australia
- Medals: Gold 2 Silver 0 Bronze 1 Total 3

Commonwealth Games appearances (overview)
- 1954; 1958; 1962; 1966; 1970; 1974; 1978; 1982; 1986; 1990; 1994; 1998; 2002; 2006; 2010; 2014; 2018; 2022; 2026; 2030

[Uganda was represented at the 2006 Commonwealth Games in Melbourne by a 12-member strong contingent comprising 6 sportspersons and 6 officials. Among the 12 members who represented Uganda at the 2006 Commonwealth Games 2 managed to win Gold medals and 1 won a Bronze medal. Two Gold Medals were both won in Athletics where Dorcus Inzikuru won it in the Women 3,000m steeplechase and Boniface Kiprop in the Men's 10,000m.

== Medals ==
	(gold)	(silver)	(bronze)	Total
Uganda	2	0	1	3

=== Gold ===
Uganda registered two Gold medals both in athletics

- Dorcus Inzikuru, Athletics, Women's 3000m Steeplechase
- Boniface Kiprop Toroitich, Athletics, Men's 10000m

=== Silver ===
Uganda didn't record any medal in the silver category

=== Bronze ===
Uganda received one medal in this category through boxing

- Martin Mubiru, Boxing, Flyweight 51 kg

== See also ==
- Uganda at the 1994 Commonwealth Games
- Uganda at the 2002 Commonwealth Games
- Uganda at the 2010 Commonwealth Games
- Uganda at the 2014 Commonwealth Games
- Uganda at the 2018 Commonwealth Games
- Uganda at the 2022 Commonwealth Games
