= Joshua Ndere =

Kenyan boxer (1981–2011)

Personal information
- Full name: Joshua Ndere Makonjio
- Nationality: Kenyan
- Born: 27 July 1981
- Died: 18 November 2011 (aged 30) Samburu, Kenya

Sport
- Sport: Boxing
Medal record
Men's boxing
Representing Kenya
All-Africa Games
Bronze medal – third place	2007 Algiers	Light heavyweight
Commonwealth Games
Bronze medal – third place	2006 Melbourne	Light heavyweight
Bronze medal – third place	2010 Delhi	Light heavyweight

Joshua Ndere Makonjio (27 July 1981 – 18 November 2011) was a Kenyan amateur boxer.

== Career ==
Ndere represented Kenya at African, Commonwealth and World Championship level. As a light heavyweight boxer he was a bronze medallist at the 2006 Commonwealth Games in Melbourne, the 2007 All-Africa Games in Algiers and 2010 Commonwealth Games in Delhi. He made the second round of the 2009 World Amateur Boxing Championships.

Due to his military commitments, he missed out on the 2008 Summer Olympics, which he was considered likely to have qualified for.

== Death ==
While driving near Samburu in 2011, Ndere was killed in a head-on crash with an on-coming vehicle. He had just started annual leave and was on the road to Nairobi from his Mombasa base.
