= Swaziland at the 2006 Commonwealth Games =

Sporting event delegation

Eswatini at the Commonwealth Games
- CGF code: SWZ
- Website: eocga.org.sz
- Medals: Gold 0 Silver 0 Bronze 1 Total 1

Commonwealth Games appearances (overview)
- 1970; 1974; 1978; 1982; 1986; 1990; 1994; 1998; 2002; 2006; 2010; 2014; 2018; 2022; 2026; 2030

Swaziland took part in the 2006 Commonwealth Games in Melbourne, Australia.

== Medals ==
	(gold)	(silver)	(bronze)	Total
Swaziland	0	0	1	1

=== Bronze ===
- Simanga Shiba, Boxing, Light Flyweight 48 kg
