= Swaziland at the 2018 Commonwealth Games =

Eswatini at the 2018 Commonwealth Games
- Flag of Eswatini
- CG code: SWZ
- CGA: Eswatini Olympic and Commonwealth Games Association
- Website: eocga.org.sz

in Gold Coast, Australia 4 April 2018 – 15 April 2018
- Competitors: 10 in 3 sports
- Medals: Gold 0 Silver 0 Bronze 0 Total 0

Commonwealth Games appearances (overview)
- 1970; 1974; 1978; 1982; 1986; 1990; 1994; 1998; 2002; 2006; 2010; 2014; 2018; 2022; 2026; 2030

Swaziland (now known as Eswatini) competed at the 2018 Commonwealth Games in the Gold Coast, Australia from April 4 to April 15, 2018.

== Competitors ==
The following is the list of number of competitors participating at the Games per sport/discipline.

Sport	Men	Women	Total
Athletics	3	2	5
Boxing	2	0	2
Cycling	3	0	3
Total	8	2	10

== Athletics (track and field) ==
Men
Track & road events

Athlete	Event	Heat		Semifinal		Final	
Athlete	Event	Result	Rank	Result	Rank	Result	Rank
Sibusiso Matsenjwa	100 m	10.40	3 q	10.37	6	Did not advance	
Sibusiso Matsenjwa	200 m	20.81	3 q	21.16	4	Did not advance	
Thandaza Zwane	200 m	21.55	5	Did not advance			
McEbo Mkhaliphi	400 m	47.45	7	Did not advance			
Thandaza Zwane	400 m	DNS		Did not advance			

Women
Track & road events

Athlete	Event	Heat		Semifinal		Final	
Athlete	Event	Result	Rank	Result	Rank	Result	Rank
Phumlile Ndzinisa	100 m	12.11	6	Did not advance			

Field events

Athlete	Event	Final	
Athlete	Event	Distance	Rank
Erika Seyama	High jump	1.70	13

== Boxing ==
Swaziland participated with a team of 2 athletes (2 men).

Men

Athlete	Event	Round of 32	Round of 16	Quarterfinals	Semifinals	Final	Rank
Athlete	Event	Opposition Result	Opposition Result	Opposition Result	Opposition Result	Opposition Result	Rank
Zweli Dlamini	−56 kg	—N/a	Bashir Nasir (UGA); W 4 - 1	Eric Basran (CAN); L 0 - 5	Did not advance		
Thabiso Dlamini	−69 kg	BYE	Terry Nickolas (AUS); L 0 - 5	Did not advance			

== Cycling ==
Swaziland participated with 3 athletes (3 men).

=== Road ===
Men

Athlete	Event	Time	Rank
Gcina Banda	Road race	DNF	
Muzi Shabangu	Road race	DNF	
Mduduzi Zwane	Road race	DNF	
