= Mauritius at the 2006 Commonwealth Games =

- CGF code: MRI
- CGA: Mauritius Olympic Committee

in Melbourne, Australia
- Flag bearer: Opening: Closing:
- Medals Ranked 23rd: Gold 0 Silver 3 Bronze 0 Total 3

Commonwealth Games appearances (overview)
- 1958; 1962; 1966; 1970; 1974; 1978; 1982; 1986; 1990; 1994; 1998; 2002; 2006; 2010; 2014; 2018; 2022; 2026; 2030

Mauritius was represented at the 2006 Commonwealth Games in Melbourne, Australia by a xx-member contingent comprising xx sportspersons and xx officials.

== Medals ==
	(gold)	(silver)	(bronze)	Total
Mauritius	0	3	0	3

== Medalists ==
=== Silver ===
- Stéphan Buckland, Athletics, Men's 200 m
- Giovanni Frontin, Boxing, Lightweight (60 kg) Category
- (Louis Richard) Bruno Julie, Boxing, Bantamweight (54 kg) Category
