= Steven Rudic =

Australian boxer (born 1976)

Medal record

Commonwealth Games
Bronze medal – third place	2006 Melbourne	Super Heavyweight

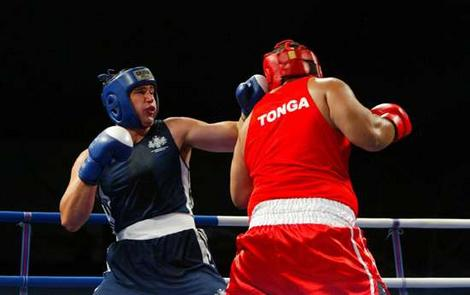
Steve Rudic of Australia in action against Isekeli Maama of Tonga Commonwealth Games 2006 Melbourne

Steve Rudic (born 21 January 1976 in Canberra) is an Australian boxer and Jiu-Jitsu practitioner best known for winning the bronze medal at the Commonwealth Games 2006 in the men's super heavyweight division.

A late starter to boxing, Steve was a former basketball player with the Canberra Cannons. He took up the sport at age 26 under the guidance of English born trainer Garry Hamilton and had just 26 fights with 18 wins before the Games. He beat massive Tongan Isekeli Maama but lost his semifinal to Welshman Kevin Evans. Following the Commonwealth Games he lost at the Australian Championships in Brisbane to the younger Daniel Beahan, who thus became the Australia's representative at the 2008 Summer Olympics.

Steven is a black belt in Brazilian jiu-jitsu and has competed locally in Australia and overseas. He won a silver medal at the Abu Dhabi Pro Gi World Championships held on 22–25 April 2015 in Abu Dhabi. Steven competed in the Master Blue Belt over 95 kg division. He won his first 2 matches and then lost the final to win a silver medal.

== Professional boxing record ==
21 fights	18 wins	3 losses
By knockout	10	2
By decision	8	1
