= Daniel Beahan =

Australian boxer (born 1984)

Personal information
- Full name: Daniel Beahan
- Nickname: "Dan"
- Nationality: Australia
- Born: 5 April 1984 (age 42) Bundaberg, Queensland
- Height: 1.88 m (6 ft 2 in)
- Weight: 93 kg (205 lb)

Sport
- Sport: Boxing
- Weight class: Super Heavyweight
- Club: Gladstone Amateur Boxing Club

Daniel Beahan (born 5 April 1984 in Bundaberg, Queensland) is an Australian amateur boxer best known to qualify for the Olympics 2008 at super heavyweight. He was an Australian Institute of Sport scholarship holder.

== Career ==
In 2002 he won a Light-Heavyweight Bronze at the Junior World Championships in Santiago, Cuba when he was stopped in the semi by Ukrainian Roman Zavalnyuk, after beating Chinese boxer XINGYA, FENG.

Until 2005 Beahan who is from Gladstone, Queensland and works as a plumber then competed at 201 lbs limit where he lost to Bradley Michael Pitt at the Nationals.

At superheavy he lost the qualifier for a berth in the Commonwealth 2006 team to the bigger Steven Rudic but managed to establish himself as the Australian representing that weightclass later by beating Rudic repeatedly.

Internationally his success has been moderate. At Grand Prix-Usti, Czech Republic, Daniel defeated Brazilian MMA superstar Antonio Rogerio Nogueira on points 20:10 before upsetting Bulgarian favourite Kubrat Pulev, with a right hook which opened a cut above Pulev's left eye, RSCI in the 2nd round. In the semi-final he was out scored 21;10 by Beka Lobzhanidze of Georgia. He lost a controversial decision to Isekeu Maama at the Oceania Championships in 2007, however beat Maama but lost to David Price (boxer) in the final of the Commonwealth Championships in Liverpool England. At the 2007 World Amateur Boxing Championshipsafter beating Roc Urbanc of Slovenia and Serbian Mane Marceta he got KOd by massive Chinese southpaw Zhang Zhilei in the quarter-finals.

In 2008 the 24-year-old did qualify for the Olympics by winning the Oceania championships. He defeated Tongan BNGATA Nimilote and Fijian CAGILOALOA Navitalai before winning the final against Uaine Fa, Tonga. He lost his 2008 Summer Olympics debut to Ruslan Myrsatayev by RSC.
