= Ruslan Myrsatayev =

Kazakhstani boxer

Personal information
- Full name: Руслан Мырсатаев
- Nationality: Kazakhstan
- Born: May 7, 1985 (age 41) Alma-Ata, Kazakh SSR, Soviet Union
- Height: 1.85 m (6 ft 1 in)
- Weight: 97 kg (214 lb)

Sport
- Sport: Boxing
- Weight class: Super Heavyweight

Ruslan Myrsatayev (born May 7, 1985) is a Kazakh boxer best known for qualifying in the Super Heavyweight division(+91 kg) at the 2008 Summer Olympics.

Kazakhstan chose to send Ruslan over veteran Mukhtarkhan Dildabekov and big-punching Rustam Rygebayev who had competed at the 2007 World Championships to the second qualifier as Myrsatayev won the competition.

The 207 lb fighter quickly KOd Australian Daniel Beahan but was knocked down and outpointed by Chinese southpaw giant Zhang Zhilei.

== Professional career ==
Myrsatayev made his professional boxing debut in 2016.

Myrsatayev signed an agreement with manager ilker Furat in 2021

== Professional boxing record ==
8 fights	8 wins	0 losses
By knockout	7	0
By decision	1	0

No.	Result	Record	Opponent	Type	Round, time	Date	Location	Notes
8	Win	8–0	Hamza Gunes	TKO	1 (8)	1 Mar 2024	Baluan Sholak Sports Palace, Almaty, Kazakhstan	
7	Win	7–0	Yury Bykhautsou	UD	8	26 Oct 2019	Baluan Sholak Sports Palace, Almaty, Kazakhstan	
6	Win	6–0	Danny Williams	KO	4 (10), 0:51	5 Jul 2019	Baluan Sholak Sports Palace, Almaty, Kazakhstan	
5	Win	5–0	Shukhrat Kurbanov	TKO	2 (6), 2:10	15 Sep 2018	Konys, Aktobe, Kazakhstan	
4	Win	4–0	Andres Matias Afranllie	TKO	4 (6), 1:40	9 Sep 2017	Saryarka Velodrome, Astana, Kazakhstan	
3	Win	3–0	Nuhu Azuma	TKO	1 (6), 1:44	29 Oct 2016	Almaty Arena, Almaty, Astana, Kazakhstan	
2	Win	2–0	Farrukh Madaminov	TKO	1 (6), 1:40	14 May 2016	Korme Exhibition Centre, Astana, Kazakhstan	
1	Win	1–0	Valery Zamiralov	TKO	1 (6), 2:38	30 Jan 2016	Royal Tulip Almaty Hotel Almaty, Kazakhstan	
