= Kahukura Bentson =

New Zealand boxer (born 1978)

Kahukura Bentson (born 2 December 1978) is a New Zealand middleweight boxer. He has represented his country at the 2002 and 2006 Commonwealth Games.
