= Eswatini at the 2022 Commonwealth Games =

- Flag of Eswatini
- CG code: SWZ
- CGA: Eswatini Olympic and Commonwealth Games Association
- Website: EOCGA Facebook site

in Birmingham, England 28 July 2022 – 8 August 2022
- Competitors: 11 (9 men and 2 women) in 4 sports
- Flag bearers (opening): Sibusiso Matsenjwa; Hayley Hoy
- Flag bearers (closing): Thabiso Dlamini; Bongiwe Mahlalela
- Medals: Gold 0 Silver 0 Bronze 0 Total 0

Commonwealth Games appearances (overview)
- 1970; 1974; 1978; 1982; 1986; 1990; 1994; 1998; 2002; 2006; 2010; 2014; 2018; 2022; 2026; 2030

Eswatini competed at the 2022 Commonwealth Games in Birmingham, England between 28 July and 8 August 2022. It was Eswatini's fourteenth appearance at the Games, and the first since its previous appearances as Swaziland.

Track athlete Sibusiso Matsenjwa and swimmer Hayley Hoy were the country's flagbearers during the opening ceremony, while boxer Thabiso Dlamini and track athlete Bongiwe Mahlalela served as the closing ceremony flagbearers.

== Competitors ==
Eswatini sent a contingent of 11 competitors to the Games.

The following is the list of number of competitors participating at the Games per sport/discipline.

Sport	Men	Women	Total
Athletics	4	1	5
Boxing	2	0	2
Cycling	2	0	2
Swimming	1	1	2
Total	9	2	11

== Athletics ==
A squad of five athletes took part in the competition.

Men
Track and road events

Athlete	Event	Heat		Semifinal		Final	
Athlete	Event	Result	Rank	Result	Rank	Result	Rank
Ayanda Malaza	100 m	DNF		did not advance			
Lwazi Msibi	100 m	10.83	5	did not advance			
Benele Dlamini	200 m	22.17	5	did not advance			
Sibusiso Matsenjwa	200 m	20.79	2 Q	20.81	3 q	20.92	7

Women
Track and road events

Athlete	Event	Heat		Semifinal		Final	
Athlete	Event	Result	Rank	Result	Rank	Result	Rank
Bongiwe Mahlalela	100 m	12.05	6	did not advance			
Bongiwe Mahlalela	200 m	25.31	4	did not advance			

== Boxing ==
A squad of two boxers took part in the competition.

Men

Athlete	Event	Round of 32	Round of 16	Quarterfinals	Semifinals	Final	
Athlete	Event	Opposition Result	Opposition Result	Opposition Result	Opposition Result	Opposition Result	Rank
Zweli Dlamini	Featherweight	Gallagher (NIR); L 0 - 5	did not advance				
Thabiso Dlamini	Light middleweight	Bye	Stanley (NZL); L RSC	did not advance			

== Cycling ==
A squad of two cyclists took part in the competition.

=== Road ===
Men

Athlete	Event	Time	Rank
Kwanele Jele	Road race	DNF	
Muzi Shabangu	Road race	DNF	

== Swimming ==
A squad of two swimmers took part in the competition.

Athlete	Event	Heat		Semifinal		Final	
Athlete	Event	Time	Rank	Time	Rank	Time	Rank
Simanga Dlamini	Men's 50 m freestyle	27.47	66	did not advance			
Simanga Dlamini	Men's 50 m butterfly	28.98	50	did not advance			
Simanga Dlamini	Men's 100 m butterfly	1:04.99	46	did not advance			
Hayley Hoy	Women's 50 m freestyle	29.98	60	did not advance			
Hayley Hoy	Women's 50 m butterfly	31.32	45	did not advance			
Hayley Hoy	Women's 100 m butterfly	1:12.21	34	did not advance			
