= Eswatini at the 2026 Commonwealth Games =

- Flag of Eswatini
- CG code: SWZ
- CGA: Eswatini Olympic and Commonwealth Games Association
- Website: EOCGA Facebook site

in Glasgow, Scotland 23 July 2026 – 2 August 2026
- Competitors: 10 in 4 sports
- Flag bearer: Hayley Hoy
- Baton bearer: Mukelo Dlamini
- Medals: Gold 0 Silver 0 Bronze 0 Total 0

Commonwealth Games appearances (overview)
- 1970; 1974; 1978; 1982; 1986; 1990; 1994; 1998; 2002; 2006; 2010; 2014; 2018; 2022; 2026; 2030

Eswatini competed at the 2026 Commonwealth Games in Glasgow, Scotland. This marked Eswatini's 15th participation at the games, after making its debut at the 1970 Commonwealth Games.

The Eswatini team consists of ten athletes (six men and four women). The athletes competed in four sports: Athletics, boxing, judo and swimming.

Swimmer Hayley Hoy was the country's flagbearer during the opening ceremony. Meanwhile, boxer Mukelo Dlamini was the baton bearer during the opening ceremony.

The Eswatini team finished the games with no medals won.

== Competitors ==
The following is the list of number of competitors participating at the Games per sport/discipline.

| Sport | Men | Women | Total |
|---|---|---|---|
| Athletics | 3 | 1 | 4 |
| Boxing | 2 | 0 | 2 |
| Judo | 0 | 1 | 1 |
| Swimming | 1 | 2 | 3 |
| Total | 6 | 4 | 10 |

== Athletics ==
Eswatini named the following athletes for the 2026 Commonwealth Games:

Key

Ranks given for track events are within the entire round.

- Q = Qualified for the next round
- q = Qualified for the next round as a fastest loser or, in field events, by position without achieving the qualifying target

Track events

| Athlete | Event | Heat | | Semifinal | | Final | |
| Athlete | Event | Result | Rank | Result | Rank | Result | Rank |
|---|---|---|---|---|---|---|---|
| Mlandvo Maziya | Men's 100 m | 10.69 | 48 | Did not advance | | | |
| Mlandvo Maziya | Men's 200 m | 21.73 | 40 | Did not advance | | | |
| Thandaza Zwane | Men's 100 m | 10.69 | 47 | Did not advance | | | |
| Thandaza Zwane | Men's 200 m | 21.95 | 46 | Did not advance | | | |
| Bongumuzi Matsebula | Men's 400 m | 49.23 | 33 | Did not advance | | | |
| Bongiwe Mahlalela | Women's 100 m | 11.96 | 30 | Did not advance | | | |
| Bongiwe Mahlalela | Women's 200 m | 24.19 | 24 | Did not advance | | | |

== Boxing ==
Eswatini entered two male boxers. Both boxers lost their opening matches and did not advance further in the competition.

Men

| Athlete | Event | Round of 32 | Round of 16 | Quarterfinals | Semifinals | Final | |
| Athlete | Event | Opposition Result | Opposition Result | Opposition Result | Opposition Result | Opposition Result | Rank |
|---|---|---|---|---|---|---|---|
| Siboniso Vilakati | 55 kg | Haoseb (NAM); L 0–5 | Did not advance | | | | |
| Mukelo Dlamini | 60 kg | Bye | Ngulube (ZAM); L 0–5 | Did not advance | | | |

== Judo ==
Eswatini entered one female judoka.

| Athlete | Event | Round of 16 | Quarterfinals | Semifinals | Repechage | Final/BM | |
| Athlete | Event | Opposition Result | Opposition Result | Opposition Result | Opposition Result | Opposition Result | Rank |
|---|---|---|---|---|---|---|---|
| Lamulela Magagula | Women's 63 kg | Sharma (IND); L 000–100 | Did not advance | | | | |

== Swimming ==
Eswatini entered three swimmers (two men and one woman).

| Athlete | Event | Heat | | Semifinal | | Final | |
| Athlete | Event | Time | Rank | Time | Rank | Time | Rank |
|---|---|---|---|---|---|---|---|
| Damien DeSousa | Men's 50 m freestyle | 24.83 | 50 | Did not advance | | | |
| Damien DeSousa | Men's 50 m breaststroke | 31.05 | 45 | Did not advance | | | |
| Hayley Hoy | Women's 200 m freestyle | 2:18.87 | 34 | Did not advance | | | |
| Hayley Hoy | Women's 100 m butterfly | 1:08.37 | 26 | Did not advance | | | |
| Siwakhile Dlamini | Women's 50 m freestyle | 28.65 | 51 | Did not advance | | | |
| Siwakhile Dlamini | Women's 100 m freestyle | 1:02.82 | 53 | Did not advance | | | |
