= Swaziland at the 2014 Commonwealth Games =

Eswatini at the 2014 Commonwealth Games
- CG code: SWZ
- CGA: Swaziland Olympic and Commonwealth Games Association
- Website: socga.org.sz

in Glasgow, Scotland
- Competitors: 14 in 5 sports
- Flag bearer: Phumlile Ndzinisa
- Medals: Gold 0 Silver 0 Bronze 0 Total 0

Commonwealth Games appearances (overview)
- 1970; 1974; 1978; 1982; 1986; 1990; 1994; 1998; 2002; 2006; 2010; 2014; 2018; 2022; 2026; 2030

Swaziland competed in the 2014 Commonwealth Games in Glasgow, Scotland from 23 July to 3 August 2014.

== Athletics ==
Key

- Note–Ranks given for track events are within the athlete's heat only
- Q = Qualified for the next round
- q = Qualified for the next round as a fastest loser or, in field events, by position without achieving the qualifying target
- NR = National record
- N/A = Round not applicable for the event

Men
Track & road events

Athlete	Event	Heat		Semifinal		Final	
Athlete	Event	Result	Rank	Result	Rank	Result	Rank
Bruno Matsenjwa	100 m	10.56	33	did not advance			
Bruno Matsenjwa	200 m	21.08	29	did not advance			
Mlandvo Shongwe	100 m	11.06	60	did not advance			
Mlandvo Shongwe	200 m	DSQ		did not advance			

Women
Track & road events

Athlete	Event	Heat		Semifinal		Final	
Athlete	Event	Result	Rank	Result	Rank	Result	Rank
Phumlile Ndzinisa	200 m	24.16	19 q	24.32	20	did not advance	
Phumlile Ndzinisa	400 m	56.38	35	did not advance			

== Boxing ==
Men

Athlete	Event	Round of 32	Round of 16	Quarterfinals	Semifinals	Final	
Athlete	Event	Opposition Result	Opposition Result	Opposition Result	Opposition Result	Opposition Result	Rank
Thabiso Dlamini	Light welterweight	Davies (WAL); L 0 - 3	did not advance				

== Cycling ==
=== Mountain biking ===
Athlete	Event	Time	Rank
William Kelly	Men's cross-country	LAP	
Moshoeshoe Khumalo	Men's cross-country	LAP	
Retha Harding	Women's cross-country	LAP	

=== Road ===
Men

Athlete	Event	Time	Rank
Ara Monadjem	Road race	DNF	
Morgan Rudd	Road race	DNF	

Women

Athlete	Event	Time	Rank
Carol du-Pont	Road race	DNF	
Linda Loffler	Road race	DNF	
Dinize Wilsch	Road race	DNF	

== Judo ==
Men

Athlete	Event	Round of 32	Round of 16	Quarterfinal	Semifinal	Repechage	Final / BM	Rank
Athlete	Event	Opposition Result	Opposition Result	Opposition Result	Opposition Result	Opposition Result	Opposition Result	Rank
Ben Magagula	−66 kg	D Nama Etoga (CMR); L 0000-1000	did not advance					

== Swimming ==
Men

Athlete	Event	Heat		Semifinal		Final	
Athlete	Event	Time	Rank	Time	Rank	Time	Rank
Mark Hoare	50 m freestyle	26.03	51	did not advance			
Mark Hoare	50 m breaststroke	33.77	35	did not advance			
Mark Hoare	100 m breaststroke	1:17.08	32	did not advance			
