= Boxing at the 2018 Commonwealth Games – Men's bantamweight =

Boxing competitions

Boxing – Men's bantamweight at the 2018 Commonwealth Games
- Venue: Oxenford Studios
- Dates: 7 – 14 April 2018
- Competitors: 16 from 16 nations

Medalists
gold medal	Peter McGrail	England
silver medal	Kurt Walker	Northern Ireland
bronze medal	Eric Basran	Canada
bronze medal	Hussamuddin Mohammed	India

The men's bantamweight boxing competitions at the 2018 Commonwealth Games in Gold Coast, Australia took place between 7 and 14 April at Oxenford Studios. Bantamweights were limited to those boxers weighing less than 56 kilograms.

Like all Commonwealth boxing events, the competition was a straight single-elimination tournament. Both semifinal losers were awarded bronze medals, so no boxers competed again after their first loss. Bouts consisted of three rounds of three minutes each, with one-minute breaks between rounds. Beginning this year, the competition was scored using the "must-ten" scoring system.

== Schedule ==
The schedule is as follows:

All times are Australian Eastern Standard Time (UTC+10)

Date	Time	Round
Saturday 7 April 2018	12:02 & 18:32	Round of 16
Tuesday 10 April 2018	18:32	Quarter-finals
Friday 13 April 2018	18:32	Semi-finals
Saturday 14 April 2018	18:32	Final

== Results ==
The draw is as follows:

Round of 16
Jack Bowen (AUS)	1
Kurt Walker (NIR)	4
Moroke Mokhotho (LES)	3
Jordy Vadamootoo (MRI)	2
Eric Basran (CAN)	5
Betero Aaree (KIR)	0
Zweli Dlamini (SWZ)	4
Bashir Nasir (UGA)	1
Benson Njangiru (KEN)
Peter McGrail (ENG)	RSC
Sikiru Ojo (NGR)	1
Samuel Addo (GHA)	4
Ezra Mwanjwango (TAN)	0
Everisto Mulenga (ZAM)	5
Boe Warawara (VAN)	0
Hussamuddin Mohammed (IND)	5

Quarterfinals
Kurt Walker (NIR)	4
Moroke Mokhotho (LES)	1
Eric Basran (CAN)	5
Zweli Dlamini (SWZ)	0
Peter McGrail (ENG)	5
Samuel Addo (GHA)	0
Everisto Mulenga (ZAM)	0
Hussamuddin Mohammed (IND)	5

Semifinals
Kurt Walker (NIR)	3
Eric Basran (CAN)	2
Peter McGrail (ENG)	5
Hussamuddin Mohammed (IND)	0

Final
Kurt Walker (NIR)	1
Peter McGrail (ENG)	4
