= Festival Melbourne2006 =

Coordinates: 37°48′49″S 144°57′47″E

Festival Melbourne2006 was a twelve-day cultural event which ran concurrently with the 2006 Commonwealth Games in the Australian city of Melbourne.
