= Eric Basran =

Canadian boxer (born 1998)

Personal information
- Born: 19 October 1998 (age 27) Surrey, British Columbia, Canada
- Height: 5 ft 10 in (178 cm)
- Weight: Lightweight; Super lightweight

Boxing career

Boxing record
- Total fights: 9
- Wins: 8
- Win by KO: 3
- Losses: 1
Medal record
Men's amateur boxing
Representing Canada
Commonwealth Games
Bronze medal – third place	2018 Gold Coast	Bantamweight

Eric Basran (born 19 October 1998) is a Canadian professional boxer. As an amateur, Basran won a bronze medal at the 2018 Commonwealth Games as well as competing at the 2019 World Championships.

== Amateur career ==
=== Commonwealth Games result ===
Gold Coast 2018

- Round of 16: Defeated Betero Aaree (Kiribati) 5–0
- Quarter-finals: Defeated Zweli Dlamini (Swaziland) 5–0
- Semi-finals: Defeated by Kurt Walker (Northern Ireland) 3–2

=== World Championships result ===
Yekaterinburg 2019

- First Round: Defeated Erik Petrosyan (Armenia) 5–0
- Second Round: Defeated Nilo Guerrero (Nicaragua) 5–0
- Third Round: Defeated by Kurt Walker (Republic of Ireland) 5–0

== Professional career ==
=== Early career ===
Basran made his professional debut on 24 March 2022 against Ariel Gonzalez Vazquez. Basran won via unanimous decision after outboxing his opponent throughout the duration of the bout.

== Professional boxing record ==
9 fights	8 wins	1 loss
By knockout	3	1
By decision	5	0

No.	Result	Record	Opponent	Type	Round, time	Date	Location	Notes
9	Loss	8–1	Danylo Lozan	TKO	3 (6), 2:50	20 Jun 2025	Boulevard City, Riyadh, Saudi Arabia	
8	Win	8–0	Isaiah Johnson	SD	6	18 Apr 2025	Boulevard City, Riyadh, Saudi Arabia	
7	Win	7–0	Jorge Luis Rodriguez	TKO	1 (6), 2:15	26 Oct 2024	RBC Palace London, London, Ontario, Canada	
6	Win	6–0	Alfredo Larroque	TKO	2 (6), 0:52	27 Apr 2024	Evolution Club, Tijuana, Mexico	
5	Win	5–0	Juan Jose Lopez Alcaraz	UD	6	24 Nov 2023	South Hall, Vancouver, British Columbia, Canada	
4	Win	4–0	Andres Jimenez Vargas	UD	6	13 May 2023	Red Owl Performance Centre, Brampton, Ontario, Canada	
3	Win	3–0	Jose Carlos Ramirez Garcia	UD	6	13 Jan 2023	Place Bell, Laval, Quebec, Canada	
2	Win	2–0	Jorge Castro	KO	1 (4), 2:25	21 Apr 2022	Montreal Casino, Montreal, Quebec, Canada	
1	Win	1–0	Ariel Gonzalez Vazquez	UD	4	24 Feb 2022	Montreal Casino, Montreal, Quebec, Canada	
