= Roy Mubiru =

Ugandan powerlifter (born 1977)

Personal information
- Full name: Roy Mubiru
- Nationality: Ugandan
- Born: 12 December 1977 (age 48) Kampala
- Years active: 2008
- Weight: 105 kg (231 lb)

Sport
- Country: Uganda
- Sport: Powerlifting
- Weight class: 130 kg
- Team: National team
- Updated on 5 September 2023

Roy Mubiru (born 12 December 1977) is a Ugandan powerlifter. He participated in the 2022 Strongman Championship.

== Early life ==
Mubiru was born to Samuel Galiko (RIP) and Justine Nakabugo. He attended Kamuli Primary School.

== Career ==
In 1996, Mubiru started to practice boxing at Lukanga Boxing Club in Kampala. He went to South Africa and took part in various amateur fights before joining the sport of powerlifting in 2006. He made his debut at the 2008 Gauteng Power Lifting Championships. He has taken part in various international competitions, including events in Thailand and England, such as Fame UK, where he clinched a silver medal in his weight category. In 2011 qualified for Maso Mania Deadlift competition in Las Vegas. In December 2014, he competed in the RPS Revolution Powerlifting event in Easthampton, New England, and in February 2015, he participated in the Revolution New Jersey event. After a brief hiatus, he returned to the powerlifting scene in 2018, representing the APA (American Powerlifting Association). He qualified for the WPA World Championships Powerlifting. In 2019, he ventured to Ukraine for the World Cup Championships Powerlifting after he was among the 100 participants selected for the WPA World Cup Powerlifting Invitational Championship in Washington where he won his age group category of 40–45 years under the 124 kg tested raw class. From 2019 to 2020, he attended APA and WPA powerlifting referee online courses. In October 2020, he competed in the WPA World Championships and won two gold medals in his weight category and age group. In 2023, he competed at the 2023 US World Championship in Dallas, Texas

== Community work ==
During the COVID pandemic time and festive seasons, Mubiru donated various foodstuffs to Ugandan powerlifters.

== Personal life ==
Mubiru is married to Catherine Nakate and together they have a son and 2 daughters.
