= Simanga Shiba =

Swazi boxer (born 1987)

Medal record

Men's Boxing

Representing Eswatini

Commonwealth Games
Bronze medal – third place	2006 Melbourne	Light Flyweight

Simanga Shiba (born 5 December 1987) is an amateur boxer from Swaziland. He won a Bronze at the Commonwealth Games 2006 at junior flyweight.

Shiba beat Cassius Chiyanika of Zambia and Patrick Barnes of Northern Ireland but lost to eventual winner Japhet Uutoni of Namibia in the 2006 Commonwealth Games semifinal.

At the 2007 World Championships, he missed his opening bout against Luis Yanez who won by walkover.

At the first Olympic qualifier for 2008, he lost to Suleiman Bilali but received a wildcard by the AIBA. However, Shiba did not compete in Beijing.
