= Fundo Mhura =

Scottish boxer

Medal record

Representing Scotland

Men's Boxing

European Amateur Championships
Bronze medal – third place	2006	Middleweight

Fundo Chifundo Mhura (born 9 October 1983 in Zomba, Malawi)Died 2023 (Edinburgh) is a Scottish amateur boxer best known for winning bronze at the 2006 European Amateur Boxing Championships at middleweight.

== Career ==
Mhura left the African country when he was five months old and has lived in Scotland since. He is a member of the Leith Victoria boxing club of Scotland. The 6'1 fighter fought for his native country Malawi at welterweight (69/152 lbs) at the Commonwealth Games 2006 where he lost in the second round to Nigerian Olufemi Ajayi.

He moved up a division afterwards and became the first Scot to win a European boxing medal since Scott Harrison in 1996. He lost the semi-final controversially on points to Azeri Rahib Beylarov 18:23.
