= Bongani Mahlangu =

South African boxer

Personal information
- Nicknames: Dancing Shoes; Wonderboy
- Nationality: (South Africa) South African
- Born: 7 October 1979 (age 46) Boipatong, Gauteng, South Africa
- Height: 5 ft 6 in (1.68 m)
- Weight: Super bantamweight

Boxing career
- Stance: Southpaw

Boxing record
- Total fights: 26
- Wins: 20
- Win by KO: 10
- Losses: 6

Bongani Mahlangu
Medal record

Representing South Africa

Men's Boxing

All-Africa Games
Silver medal – second place	2003 Abuja	Lightweight

Bongani ("Wonderboy") Mahlangu (born 7 October 1979) is a South African professional boxer. As an amateur, he participated in the 2004 Summer Olympics, where he was stopped in the first round of the lightweight division by Azerbaijan's Rovshan Huseynov.

Mahlangu won the silver medal in the same division one year earlier, at the All-Africa Games in Abuja, Nigeria.

== Professional boxing record ==
30 fights	22 wins	8 losses
By knockout	10	0
By decision	12	8

No.	Result	Record	Opponent	Type	Round, time	Date	Location	Notes
30	Loss	22–8	(Rwanda) Patrick Kinigamazi	MD	12	12 Dec 2019	Cirque de Noel, Geneva, Switzerland	For WBF super featherweight title
29	Win	22–7	(South Africa) Sithembiso Maduna	PTS	8	30 Jun 2019	Community Hall, KwaThema, South Africa	
28	Win	21–7	(South Africa) Asiphe Ntshili	PTS	6	3 Sep 2017	Portuguese Hall, Johannesburg, South Africa	
27	Loss	20–7	(South Africa) Lodumo Lamati	PTS	12	30 Apr 2017	Orient Theatre, East London, South Africa	Lost South African super bantamweight title
26	Win	20–6	(South Africa) Unathi Gqokoma	TKO	7 (12), 1:55	5 Aug 2016	Emerald Casino, Vanderbijlpark, South Africa	Won vacant IBF International super bantamweight title
25	Win	19–6	(South Africa) Bonakele Bikitsha	PTS	12	17 Jun 2016	Orient Theatre, East London, South Africa	Retained South African super bantamweight title
24	Win	18–6	(South Africa) Toto Helebe	PTS	12	11 Mar 2016	Orient Theatre, East London, South Africa	Won vacant WBO International super bantamweight title
23	Win	17–6	(South Africa) Mfusi Maxhayi	UD	12	25 Sep 2015	Orient Theatre, East London, South Africa	Retained South African super bantamweight title
22	Win	16–6	(South Africa) Siviwe Hasheni	TKO	9 (12)	22 Mar 2015	Mdantsane Indoor Centre, Mdantsane, South Africa	Won South African super bantamweight title
21	Loss	15–6	(Namibia) Abraham Ndauendapo	UD	12	5 Jul 2014	Windhoek Country Club Resort, Windhoek, Namibia	For IBF Continental Africa super featherweight title
20	Win	15–5	(South Africa) Sibusiso Khumalo	PTS	6	6 Oct 2013	Orlando Community Hall, Johannesburg, South Africa	
19	Win	14–5	(South Africa) Themba Lesiba	SD	6	2 Jun 2013	Orlando Community Hall, Soweto, South Africa	
18	Win	13–5	(South Africa) Mxolisi Nombewu	KO	1 (6)	17 Feb 2013	Nasrec Indoor Arena, Johannesburg, South Africa	
17	Loss	12–5	(South Africa) Malcolm Klassen	UD	8	3 Dec 2012	Emperors Palace, Kempton Park, South Africa	
16	Loss	12–4	(Namibia) Paulus Ambunda	SD	12	5 Nov 2011	Windhoek Country Club Resort, Windhoek, Namibia	For WBO Africa bantamweight title
15	Loss	12–3	(South Africa) Cleutus Mbhele	PTS	8	4 Feb 2011	Ben Marais Hall, Rustenburg, South Africa	
14	Win	12–2	(Ghana) Asamoah Wilson	TKO	1 (12), 2:09	22 Jan 2010	Town Hall, Bloemfontein, South Africa	Retained WBA Pan African bantamweight title
13	Win	11–2	(Ghana) Prosper Ankrah	TKO	6 (12)	15 May 2009	Boiketlong Hall, Sasolburg, South Africa	Retained WBA Pan African bantamweight title
12	Loss	10–2	(South Africa) Tshifhiwa Munyai	SD	12	14 Nov 2008	Ride Hall, Parys, South Africa	For WBA Inter-Continental bantamweight title
11	Win	10–1	(Uganda) Martin Mubiru	UD	12	12 Sep 2008	Multipurpose Centre, Kestell, South Africa	Retained WBA Pan African bantamweight title
10	Win	9–1	(Zimbabwe) Peter Pambeni	TKO	12 (12), 1:02	23 Feb 2008	Town Hall, Bloemfontein, South Africa	Won vacant WBA Pan African bantamweight title
9	Win	8–1	(South Africa) Simon Ramoni	PTS	6	30 Nov 2007	Carousel Casino, Hammanskraal, South Africa	
8	Loss	7–1	(South Africa) Vuyisile Bebe	SD	8	25 Aug 2007	Mdantsane Indoor Centre, East London, South Africa	
7	Win	7–0	(South Africa) Nkosinathi Tshinavhe	PTS	6	1 Jun 2007	(South Africa) Indoor Sports Centre, Thohoyandou	
6	Win	6–0	(South Africa) Mbulelo Transvaal	PTS	4	11 May 2007	Sasol Recreation Centre, Secunda, South Africa	
5	Win	5–0	(South Africa) Macbute Sinyabi	KO	1 (4)	19 Jan 2007	Masizakhe Arena, Carletonville, South Africa	
4	Win	4–0	(South Africa) Siviwe Hasheni	KO	1 (4)	25 Nov 2006	Rustenburg, South Africa	
3	Win	3–0	(South Africa) Sipho Nkadimeng	TKO	1 (4)	28 Oct 2006	Portuguese Hall, Johannesburg, South Africa	
2	Win	2–0	(South Africa) Lwazi Phakathi	TKO	1 (4)	16 Sep 2006	Thohoyandou, South Africa	
1	Win	1–0	(South Africa) Ntobeko Duma	PTS	4	12 Aug 2006	Durban, South Africa	
