= Martin Mubiru =

Ugandan boxer

Personal information
- Born: December 25, 1984 (age 41)
Medal record
Men's Boxing
Representing Uganda
Commonwealth Games
Bronze medal – third place	2006 Manchester	Flyweight

Martin Mubiru (born December 25, 1984) is a boxer from Uganda, who won the bronze medal at 2006 Commonwealth Games.

In 2006 Mubiru won the bronze medal at the 2006 Commonwealth Games in the flyweight (51 kg.) division. In the first round, Mubiru won against Benedict Telovae from Solomon Islands. In the quarterfinals Mubiru defeated Kenyan boxer Duncan Kuria by PTS (22:24). In the semi-finals Mubiru losing to Jackson Chauke from South Africa.

== Professional career ==
Mubiru made his professional debut in October 2006 at the Prefectural Gymnasium, Japan. On September 12, 2008, at the Multipurpose Centre in Kestell, Mubiru fought WBA Pan-African bantamweight title holder Bongani Mahlangu. Mahlangu dominated the fight and came away with judges scores of 118-110, 108-120 and 110-119.
