= Alex Mubiru =

Ugandan economist and corporate executive

Alex Mutebi Mubiru
- Born: 1968 (age 57–58); Uganda
- Citizenship: Ugandan
- Education: Macalester College; Bachelor of Arts; Princeton University; Master’s Degree in Public Affairs; Doctor of Philosophy in Public Affairs
- Occupations: Economist & Public Administrator
- Years active: 1994 — present
- Title: Director General in the Cabinet of the President of the African Development Bank

Alex Mutebi Mubiru is a Ugandan economist, development banker and former academic, currently serving as Director General in the Cabinet of the President of the African Development Bank (AfDB), since August 2022, based at the bank's headquarters in Abidjan, Ivory Coast.

== Education ==
Mubiru holds a Bachelor of Arts degree in Philosophy, Political Science and Economics from Macalester College, in Saint Paul, Minnesota, in the United States. His Master's Degree in Public Affairs and Urban and Regional Planning as well as his Doctor of Philosophy degree in Public Affairs, were both awarded by Princeton University’s School of Public and International Affairs, in New Jersey, in the United States.

== Career ==
He began his career as a Research Associate at the Thailand Development Research Institute (TDRI), in their International Economics Program, from 1994 until 1995. Later, from 1999 until 2001, he worked as the Project Economist for the World Bank, based at their Thailand Office.

Mubiru then spent the next nine years in academia. He was an Assistant Professor of Public Policy at the Lee Kuan Yew School of Public Policy at the National University of Singapore, from 2001 until 2008. He also briefly worked as Assistant Professor of Social Science at the Singapore Management University from 2008 until 2009.

In 2009, he joined the AfDB as a Principal Research Economist at the AfDB’s then temporary office in Tunis, Tunisia. He next served as the Principal Country Economist, at the AfDB Country Office in Dar es Salaam, United Republic of Tanzania, serving there from 2010 until 2012, before being reassigned as Lead Strategy Advisor in the AfDB’s Strategy and Operations Policy Department, from 2012 until 2014. During this time, Mubiru was a member of the core team that oversaw the development of AfDB's Ten-Year Strategy (2013 to 2022) and was task manager for the development of the AfDB's Private Sector Strategy (2013 to 2017).

Starting from 2014, Mubiru served as Manager in the AfDB’s Resource Mobilization Department at the AfDB, until 2018 when he was appointed as Country Representative to the Republic of Tanzania, where he managed a portfolio of over $2.3 billion, and serving there until 2020. In November 2020, Akinwumi Adesina, the President of AfDB, appointed Mubiru to his Cabinet as Director of Strategy and Delivery, the position from which he was thereafter elevated to his current position.

== Personal details ==
A native of Uganda, Mubiru is married with two children. His late father, Joseph Mubiru, served as the Governor of the Bank of Uganda in the 1970s.

== See also ==
- African Development Bank
- World Bank
