= Giovanni Frontin =

Mauritian boxer (born 1977)

Personal information
- Nationality: Mauritian
- Born: 25 November 1977 (age 47)

Sport
- Sport: Boxing

Giovanni Michael Frontin (born 25 November 1977) is a Mauritian former boxer. He competed in the men's lightweight event at the 2000 Summer Olympics.
