= 2006 Commonwealth Games =

Multi-sport event in Melbourne, Australia

XVIII Commonwealth Games
- Host city: Melbourne, Australia
- Motto: United by the moment
- Nations: 71
- Athletes: 4,071
- Events: 245 in 17 sports
- Opening: 15 March 2006
- Closing: 26 March 2006
- Opened by: Elizabeth II
- Closed by: Prince Edward, Earl of Wessex
- Athlete's Oath: Adam Pine
- Queen's Baton Final Runner: John Landy
- Main venue: Melbourne Cricket Ground

The 2006 Commonwealth Games, officially the XVIII Commonwealth Games and commonly known as Melbourne 2006, were an international multi-sport event for members of the Commonwealth held in Melbourne, Australia between 15 and 26 March 2006. It was the fourth time Australia had hosted the Commonwealth Games. It was also the largest sporting event to be staged in Melbourne, eclipsing the 1956 Summer Olympics in terms of the number of teams and athletes competing, and events being held.

More than 4,000 athletes from 71 Commonwealth Games Associations took part in the event. Zimbabwe withdrew its membership from the Commonwealth of Nations and Commonwealth Games Federation on 8 December 2003 and so did not participate in the event. With 245 sets of medals, the Games featured 17 Commonwealth sports. These sporting events took place at 13 venues in the host city, two venues in Bendigo and one venue each in Ballarat, Geelong, Lysterfield Park and Traralgon.

The site for the opening and closing ceremonies was the Melbourne Cricket Ground, which was also used during the 1956 Olympics. The mascot for the games was Karak, a red-tailed black cockatoo (a threatened species). The official song of the Games, "Together We Are One", was composed by the ARIA awardee Australian recording artist Delta Goodrem. During the closing ceremony of the games, President of the Commonwealth Games Federation Mike Fennell declared to the crowd "Melbourne, you are simply the best".

For the first time in the history of the Commonwealth Games, the Queen's Baton visited every single Commonwealth nation and territory taking part in the Games, a journey of 180,000 kilometres (110,000 miles). The relay ended when the Governor of Victoria, and former Commonwealth Games medallist, John Landy delivered the baton to Her Majesty the Queen at the Melbourne Cricket Ground during the opening ceremony.

The host nation Australia topped the medal table for the fifth time in the past five Commonwealth Games, winning the most golds (84) and most medals overall (221). England and Canada finished second and third respectively.

The 2006 Commonwealth Games have been lauded as "best Commonwealth Games ever". A KPMG analysis of 2006 Commonwealth Games found the event prompted an increase in gross state product of about A$1.6 billion over a 20-year period and employment of about 13,600 jobs.

== Host selection ==
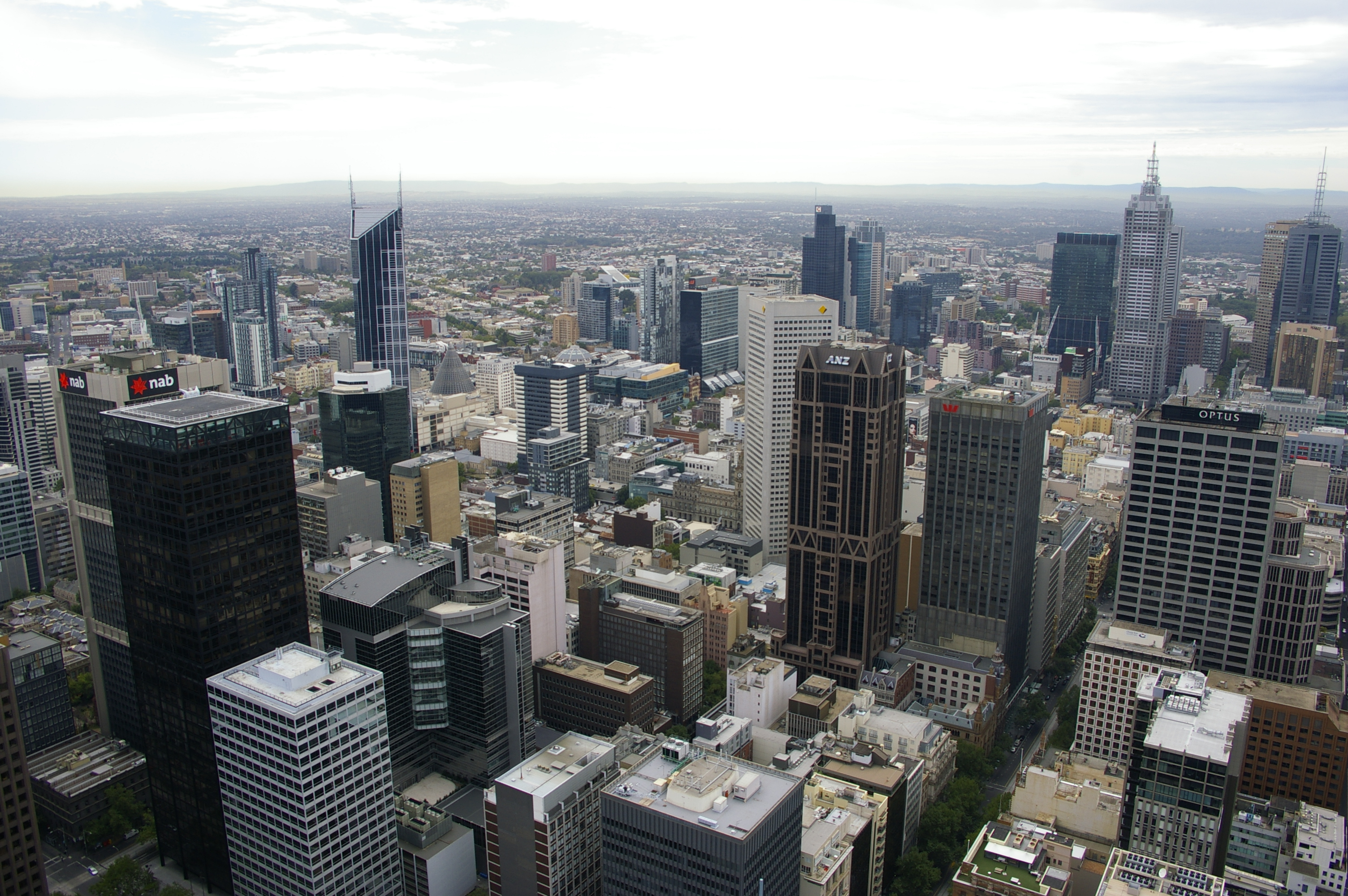
Melbourne was selected by the Australian Commonwealth Games Association as the official bid city from Australia for the 2006 Commonwealth Games

Having previously hosted the 1956 Olympics, Melbourne has hosted world sporting events such as the 1979 World Fencing Championships. The city made a bid to host the 1996 Summer Olympics, but was unsuccessful in its bid to Atlanta. Following the failure of the Olympic bid, the city would later make plans to host the Commonwealth Games. During the 1998 Commonwealth Games in Kuala Lumpur, Malaysia, two cities initially expressed interest in hosting the event; Melbourne, Australia and Wellington, New Zealand. Wellington withdrew its bid, citing the costs involved with matching the bid plan presented by Melbourne, which became the default host without members of the Federation going to vote.

2006 Commonwealth Games bidding results
City	Nation	Votes
Melbourne	Australia	Unanimous

== Preparation and development ==
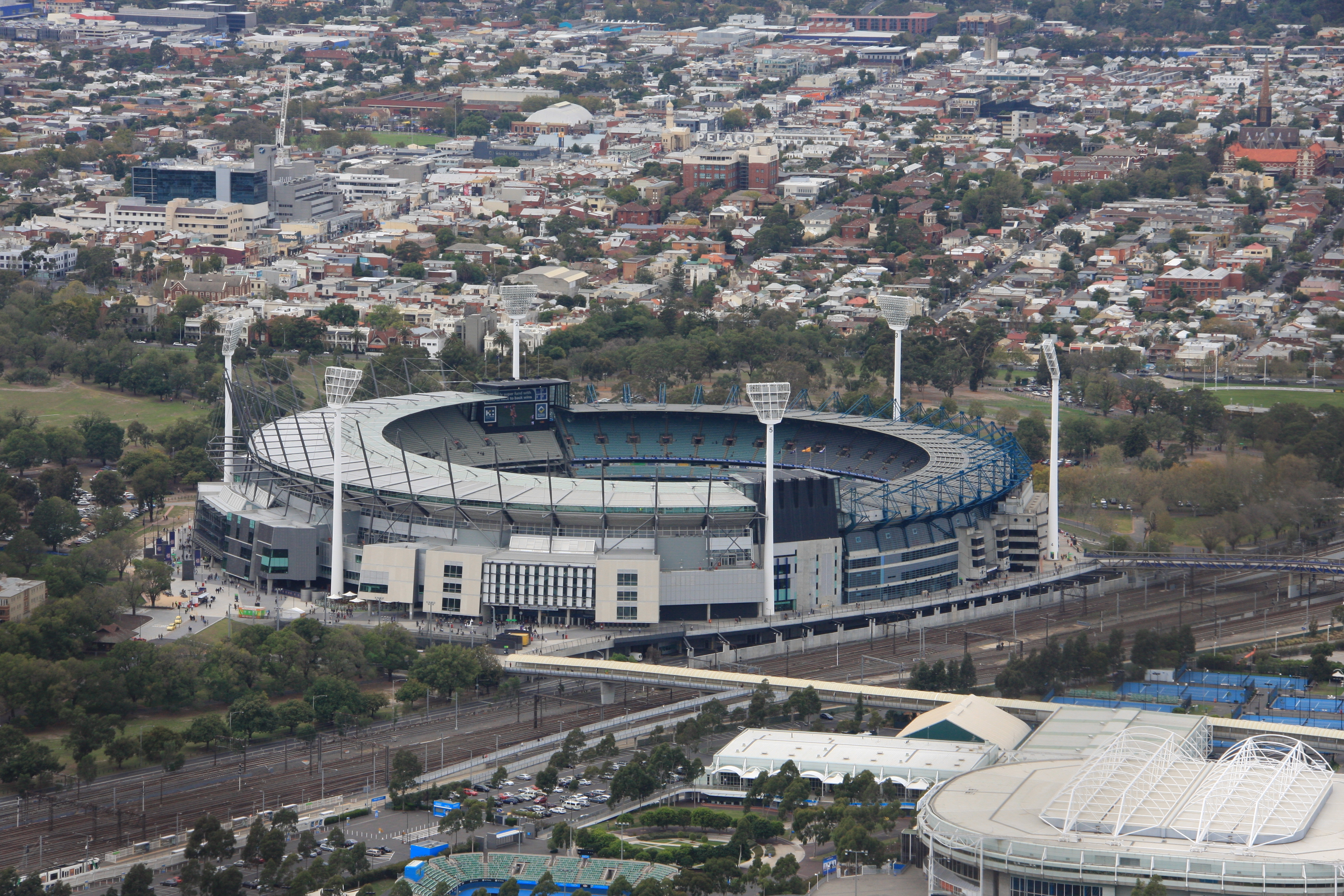
Melbourne Cricket Ground

=== Venues ===
The following venues were used at the 2006 Commonwealth Games. The sport(s) that were played at that venue are listed after it.

==== Melbourne venues ====
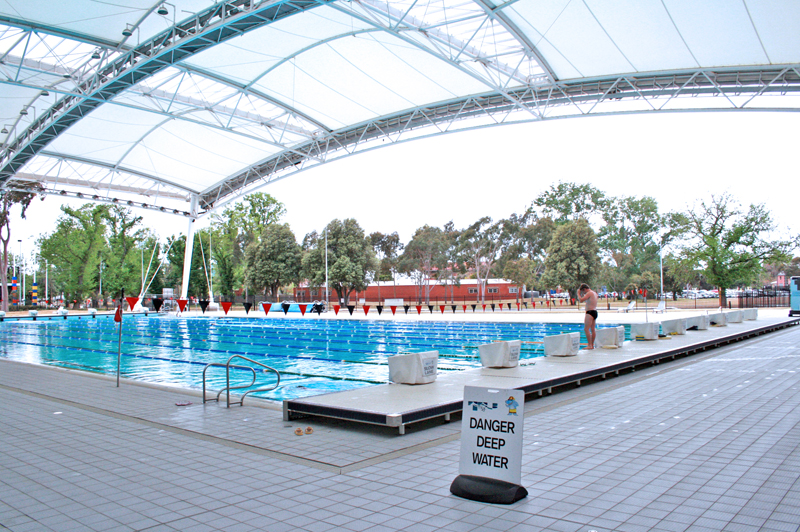
Melbourne Sports and Aquatic Centre

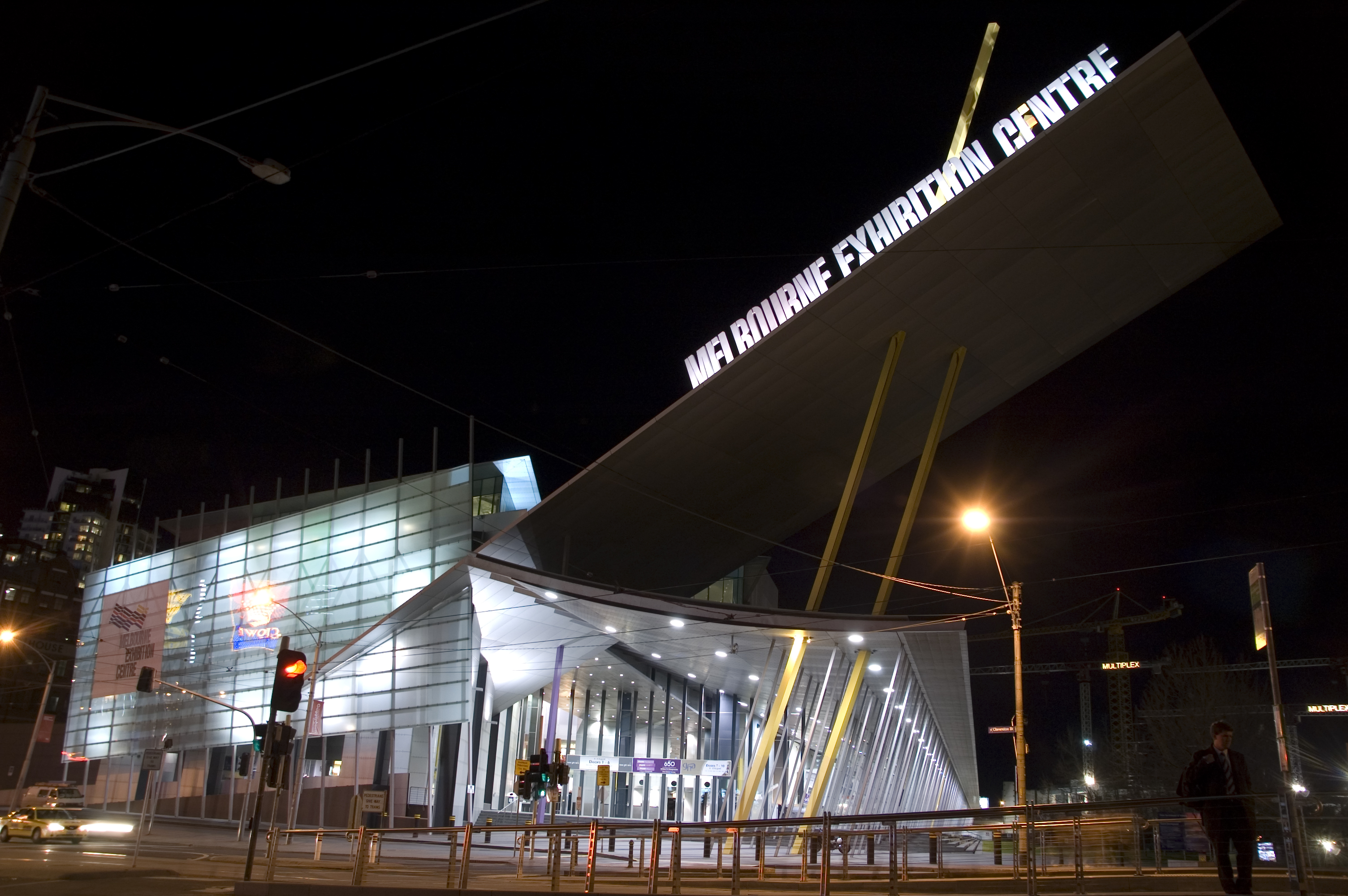
Melbourne Convention and Exhibition Centre

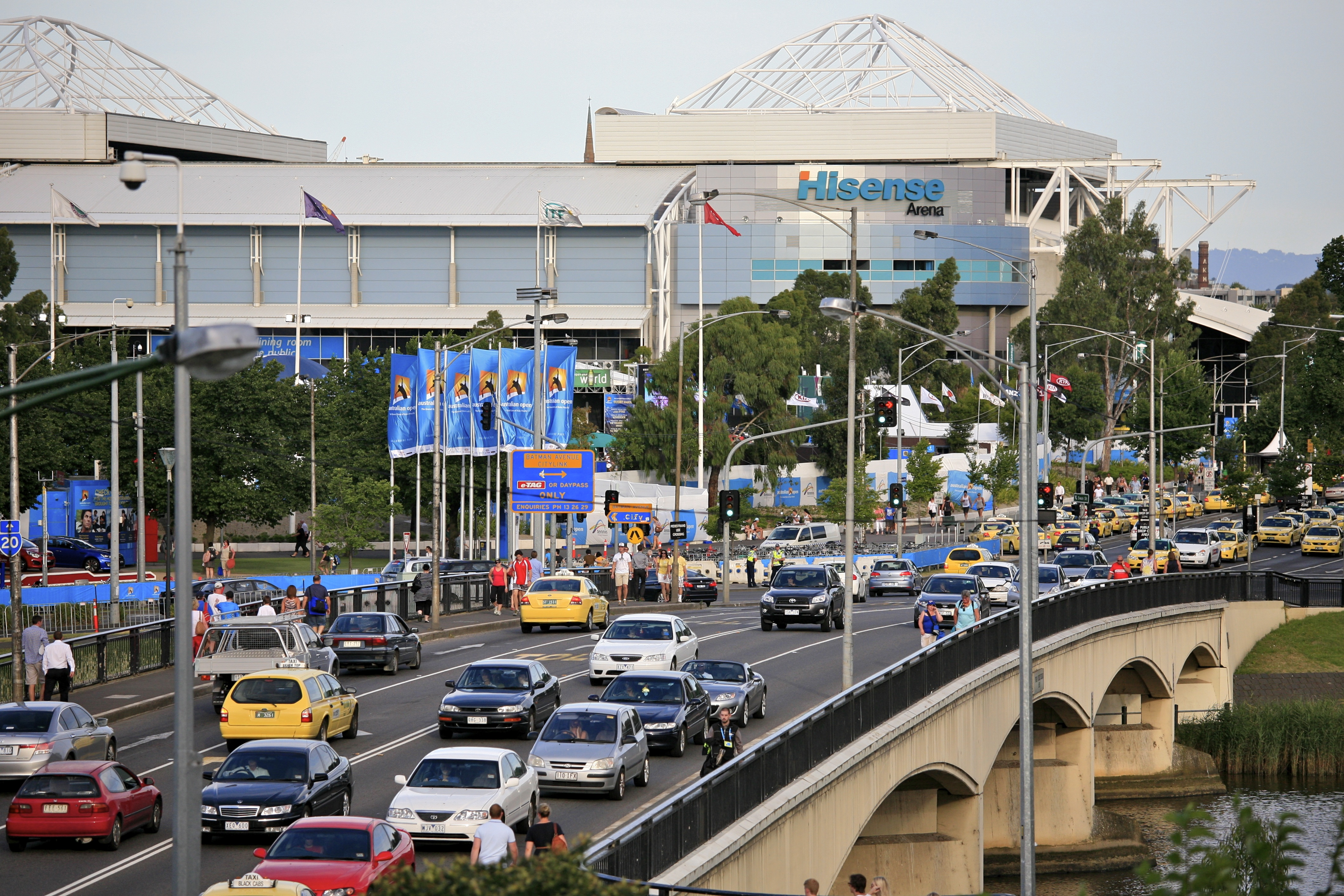
Multi Purpose Venue (Melbourne Park)

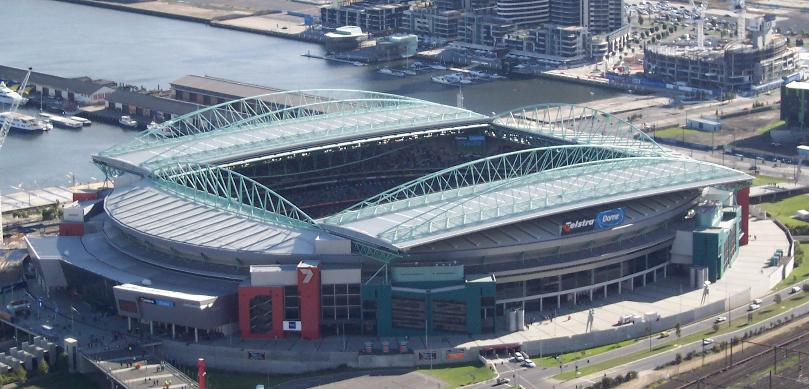
Docklands Stadium

- Docklands Precinct: Walks and Marathon
- Melbourne Cricket Ground: Opening and closing ceremonies, and Athletics (Track and Field)
- Melbourne Convention and Exhibition Centre: Badminton, Boxing and Weightlifting
- Melbourne Gun Club: Clay Target Shooting
- Melbourne International Shooting Club: Small Bore and Pistol Shooting
- Melbourne Sports and Aquatic Centre: Aquatics, Squash and Table tennis
- Multi Purpose Venue (Melbourne Park): Basketball Finals, Track Cycling and Netball Finals
- Rod Laver Arena (Melbourne Park): Gymnastics
- Royal Botanic Gardens Circuit: Cycling Road Race events
- State Lawn Bowls Centre: Lawn Bowls
- State Netball and Hockey Centre: Netball preliminaries and Hockey
- St Kilda: Triathlon and Cycling Time Trial
- Docklands Stadium: Rugby Sevens

==== Regional and suburban venues ====
Ballarat
Ballarat Minerdome: Basketball
Bendigo
Bendigo Stadium: Basketball
Wellsford Rifle Range: Full Bore Shooting
Geelong
Geelong Arena: Basketball
Lysterfield Park
State Mountain Bike Course: Mountain Bike Cycling
Traralgon
Traralgon Sports Stadium: Basketball

=== Cost ===
Early concerns arose about the large cost of staging the event, with projected costs likely to be over AU$1 billion and a high likelihood the Victorian taxpayer would have to cover the expense. The cost was described in some local media as excessive. National Party leader Peter Ryan said that the Labor government should win "gold (medal) for burning money". However, not all of this money was wasted. The final costs for hosting the Games was AU$1.144 billion, and prior to the Games, accountants at KPMG were estimating that the gross income generated by this event could be as high as AU$1.5 billion.

=== Athletes' village ===
An athlete's village in the inner suburb of Parkville housed approximately 7,000 athletes and support staff during the Games, and has been transformed into commercial housing with a distinctly eco-friendly image. The creation of this village attracted controversy, with critics claiming it was created by alienating public parkland, while proponents maintained that it represented the renewal of an otherwise derelict inner-city area.

=== Development ===
The change from Daylight Saving Time to Standard Time in Australian states that follow it was delayed from 26 March to 2 April in 2006 to avoid affecting the Games. In addition, state and private schools amended their usual term times to allow the first term holidays to coincide with the Games.

Melbourne's public transport system – train, tram and bus – ran to altered timetables with some amended or substituted services for the duration of the Games. For the most part, timetabled services were unchanged but suffered due to higher loads.

For the first time ever, the Melbourne 2006 Commonwealth Games appointed a Goodwill Partner, Plan International Australia.

=== Opening ceremony ===
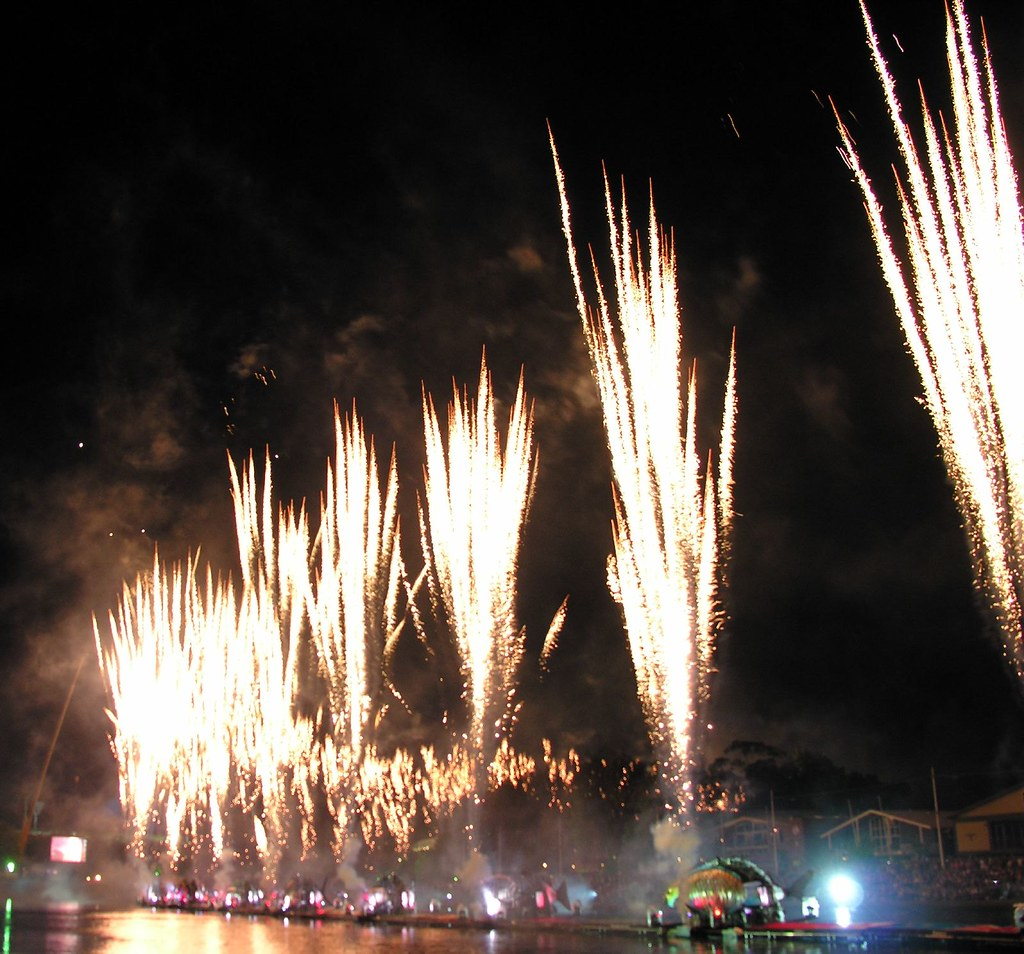
Fireworks at the Yarra River during the opening ceremony of the 2006 Commonwealth Games

Both the Melbourne Cricket Ground and the Yarra River were centrepieces for the ceremony, which included many fireworks, and other spectacle. The Games were opened by Elizabeth II, in her capacity as Head of the Commonwealth. The Queen is also Head of State of a number of Commonwealth countries.

=== Closing ceremony ===
Both the Melbourne Cricket Ground and the Yarra River were again centrepieces for the ceremony. Samresh Jung of India was given the David Dixon Award at the closing ceremony. He was the "Best Athlete of the 18th Commonwealth Games". The games were closed by The Earl of Wessex, Prince Edward.

== Participating teams ==
There were 71 countries, territories and bodies competing at the 2006 Commonwealth Games. The only difference is the roster between the 2006 Games and the 2002 Games was the absence of Zimbabwe, which had withdrawn from the Commonwealth of Nations.

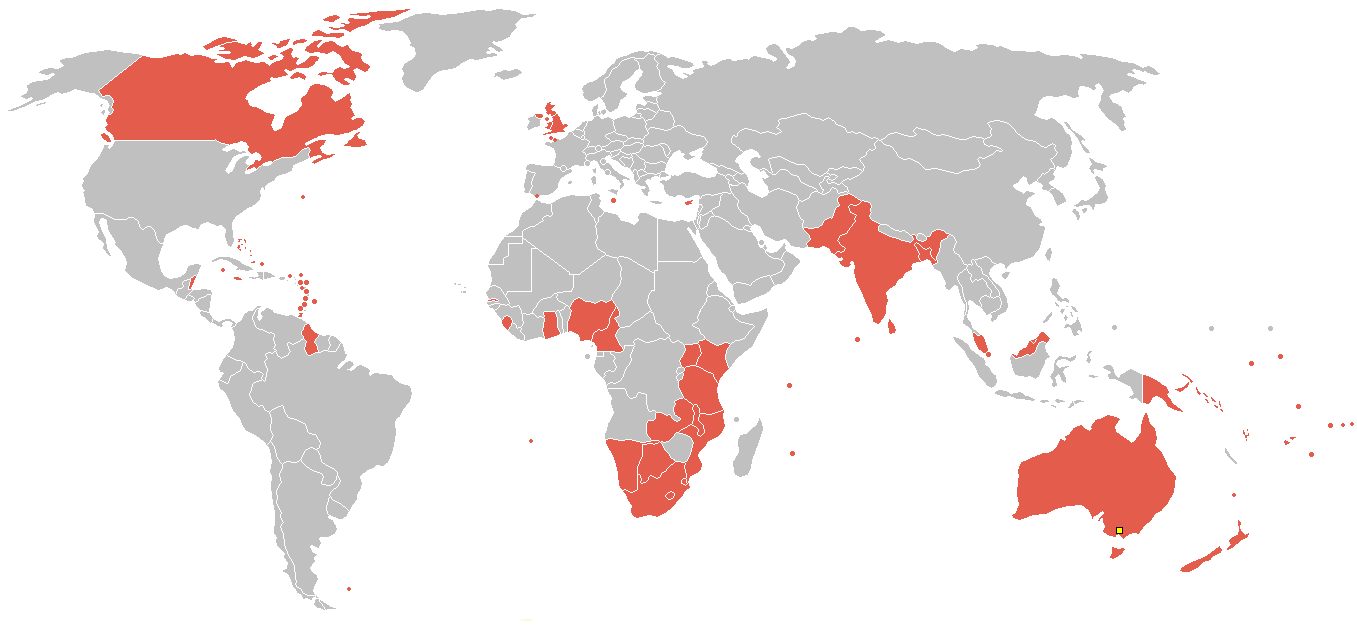
Countries and places competing at the games

Participating Commonwealth countries and territories
- Anguilla (6)
- Antigua and Barbuda (18)
- Australia (312) (host)
- Bahamas (28)
- Bangladesh (20)
- Barbados (21)
- Belize (8)
- Bermuda (18)
- Botswana (21)
- British Virgin Islands (5)
- Brunei (6)
- Cameroon (29)
- Canada (254)
- Cayman Islands (17)
- Cook Islands (32)
- Cyprus (43)
- Dominica (6)
- England (348)
- Falkland Islands (6)
- Fiji (52)
- The Gambia (15)
- Ghana (36)
- Gibraltar (16)
- Grenada (7)
- Guernsey (28)
- Guyana (21)
- India (198)
- Isle of Man (27)
- Jamaica (85)
- Jersey (35)
- Kenya (101)
- Kiribati (15)
- Lesotho (29)
- Malawi (30)
- Malaysia (170)
- Maldives (13)
- Malta (35)
- Mauritius (50)
- Montserrat (3)
- Mozambique (19)
- Namibia (35)
- Nauru (10)
- New Zealand (249)
- Nigeria (124)
- Niue (33)
- Norfolk Island (9)
- Northern Ireland (64)
- Pakistan (53)
- Papua New Guinea (41)
- Saint Helena (4)
- Saint Kitts and Nevis (2)
- Saint Lucia (9)
- Saint Vincent and the Grenadines (23)
- Samoa (51)
- Scotland (166)
- Seychelles (22)
- Sierra Leone (21)
- Singapore (63)
- Solomon Islands (13)
- South Africa (250)
- Sri Lanka (75)
- Swaziland (15)
- Tanzania (22)
- Tonga (22)
- Trinidad and Tobago (71)
- Turks and Caicos Islands (6)
- Tuvalu (5)
- Uganda (41)
- Vanuatu (12)
- Wales (143)
- Zambia (23)

== Calendar ==
OC	Opening ceremony	●	Event competitions	1	Gold medal events	CC	Closing ceremony

March	15th Wed	16th Thu	17th Fri	18th Sat	19th Sun	20th Mon	21st Tue	22nd Wed	23rd Thu	24th Fri	25th Sat	26th Sun	Events
Ceremonies	OC											CC	
Athletics					3	10	6	6	8	9	11		53
Badminton		●	●	●	●	1	●	●	●	●	●	5	6
Basketball		●	●	●	●	●	●	●	1	1			2
Boxing			●	●	●	●	●	●	●		11		11
Cycling		3	3	3	3		2		2			2	18
Diving								3	2	3	2		10
Gymnastics		1	1	2		5	5			1	1	4	24
Field hockey		●	●	●	●	●	●	●	●	2			2
Netball			●	●	●	●	●	●	●	●	●	1	1
Rugby sevens		●	1										1
Shooting			6	4	6	5	4	5	5	3	2		40
Squash		●	●	●	●	2		●	●	●	●	3	5
Swimming		5	5	9	5	11	7						42
Synchronised swimming				●	2								2
Table tennis		●	●	●	●	2	●	●	●	●	2	2	6
Weightlifting		2	2	2	2	2	2	2	1	1			16
Daily medal Events		11	18	20	21	39	26	17	19	19	29	17	245
Cumulative total		11	29	49	70	109	135	152	171	190	219	245	
March	15th Wed	16th Thu	17th Fri	18th Sat	19th Sun	20th Mon	21st Tue	22nd Wed	23rd Thu	24th Fri	25th Sat	26th Sun	Events

== Sports ==
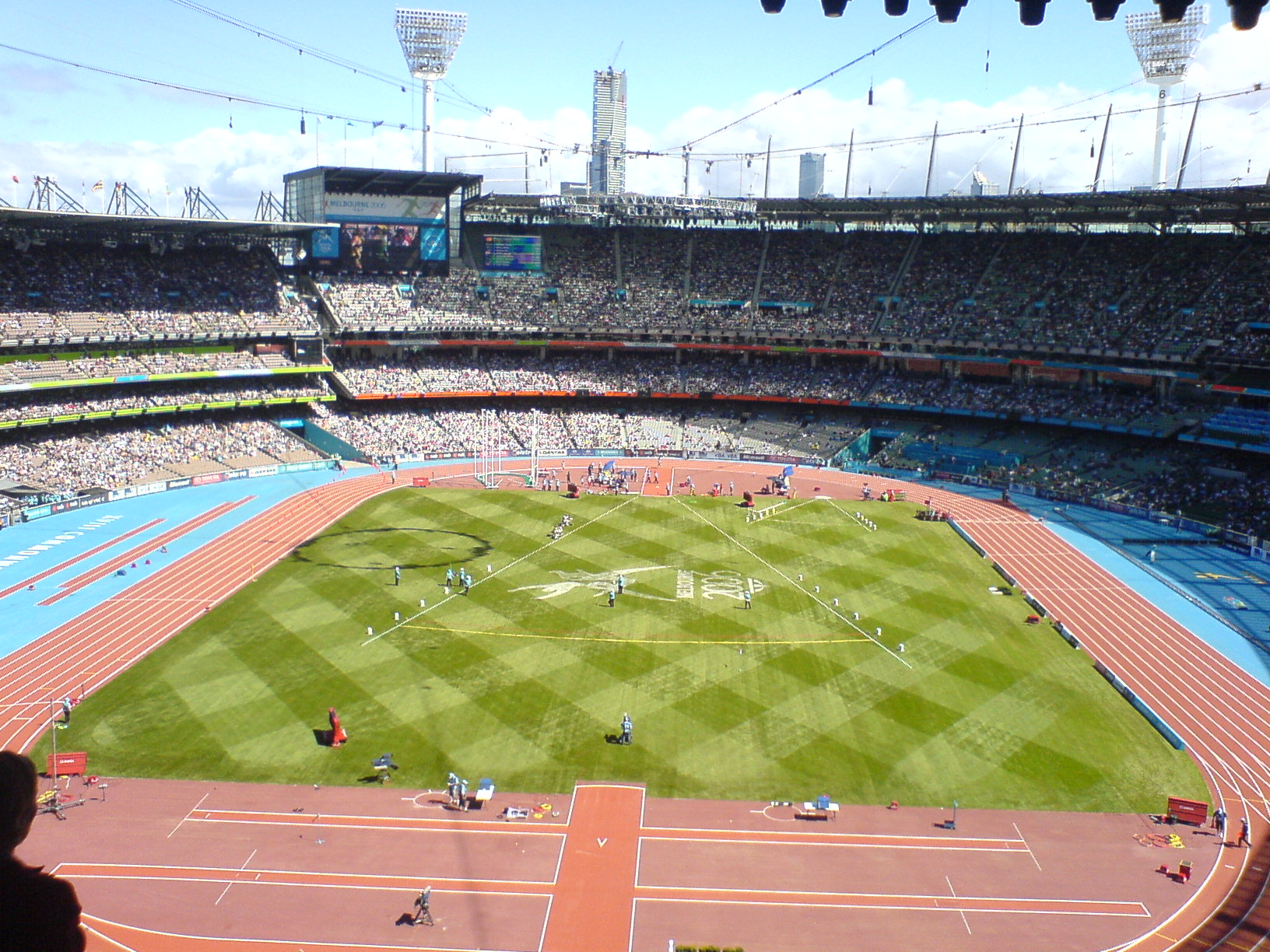
Melbourne Cricket Ground during the Games

The 2006 Commonwealth Games included 17 sports, with 12 individual sports and 4 team sports. In total there are 245 events at the Games.

- Aquatics
  - Diving
  - Swimming
  - Synchronised swimming
- Athletics
- Badminton
- Basketball
- Boxing
- Cycling
  - Road
  - Track
  - Mountain biking
- Gymnastics
  - Artistic gymnastics
  - Rhythmic gymnastics
- Field hockey
- Lawn bowls
- Netball
- Rugby sevens
- Shooting
- Squash
- Table tennis
- Triathlon
- Weightlifting

The athletics, swimming, table tennis and weightlifting sports included fully integrated events for elite athletes with a disability (EAD). These events were included in the official medal tally.

== Medal table ==
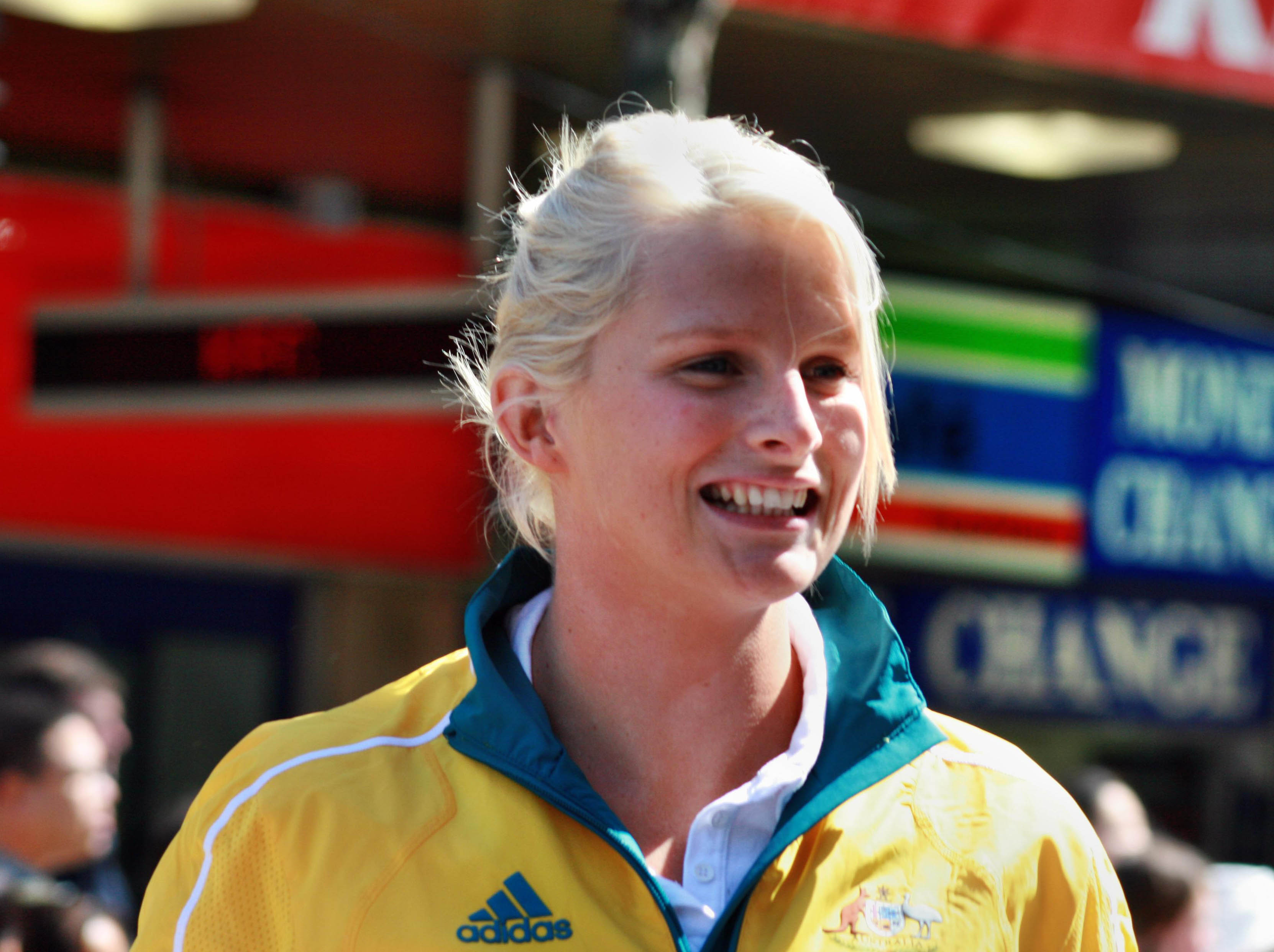
Leisel Jones won four gold medals in the swimming competition, sweeping the breaststroke events and the medley relay.

* Host nation (Australia)

Rank	Nation	Gold	Silver	Bronze	Total
1	Australia*	84	70	67	221
2	England	36	40	35	111
3	Canada	26	28	32	86
4	India	22	17	11	50
5	South Africa	12	13	13	38
6	Scotland	11	7	11	29
7	Jamaica	10	4	8	22
8	Malaysia	7	12	10	29
9	New Zealand	6	12	13	31
10	Kenya	6	5	7	18
Totals (10 entries)		220	208	207	635

== Broadcasting ==
- The host broadcaster was Trans World International, while the domestic rights-holding broadcaster was the Nine Network in Australia. They showed rolling coverage, except for a break for the evening news and overnight.
- In Australia, Fox Sports broadcast the Games on eight dedicated digital Pay-TV channels. These were available on the Foxtel, Austar and Optus Vision networks.
- The BBC covered the Commonwealth Games in the United Kingdom on BBC One and BBC Two. BBCi included a choice of two extra video streams on Freeview and four streams on Digital Satellite and Cable. Users with broadband in the United Kingdom could also view all 5 video streams on bbc.co.uk, and the BBC Sport website.
- CBC, CBC Newsworld, and CBC Country Canada aired a daily one-hour highlights show of the Commonwealth Games in Canada. Compared to past games, the CBC's coverage was minimally staffed, with commentary from other broadcasting partners. At first, they did not even consider bidding for the broadcasting rights due to scheduling conflicts with events Canadians are more interested in, such as the Tim Hortons Brier, World Figure Skating Championships, and the 2006 Winter Paralympics (which itself had been reduced to five-to-ten-minute daily coverage). None of Canada's metropolitan newspapers sent any journalists to report on the Games, instead relying on news agencies
- TVNZ covered the Games for the residents of New Zealand.
- In Malaysia, TV1 broadcast live coverage of the Games for three hours starting at 10 am Malaysian time and for two hours starting at 3 pm, with highlights at 12:30 am. Satellite provider Astro included three dedicated channels to broadcast the Games live to its Sports package subscribers, in addition to delayed broadcast 24 hours later.
- Singapore's MediaCorp TV had supposedly not broadcast the games due to the high cost of telecast rights, satellite charges and the lack of sponsors. However, on 17 March, the MediaCorp found other sponsors which is the Ministry of Community Development, Youth and Sports and the Singapore Sports Council. Broadcast started from 18 March until the end of the games.
- In India, Prasar Bharati broadcast the games on DD National and DD Sports. All India Radio broadcast the running commentary of the main matches and events.
- In the United States, selected coverage was carried by Fox College Sports.
- In the Bahamas, Cable 12 on cable Bahamas broadcast the games.
- In Europe, coverage was carried by EBU members.
- Altogether, an estimated 4 billion viewers watched the 2006 Commonwealth Games worldwide.

== Marketing ==
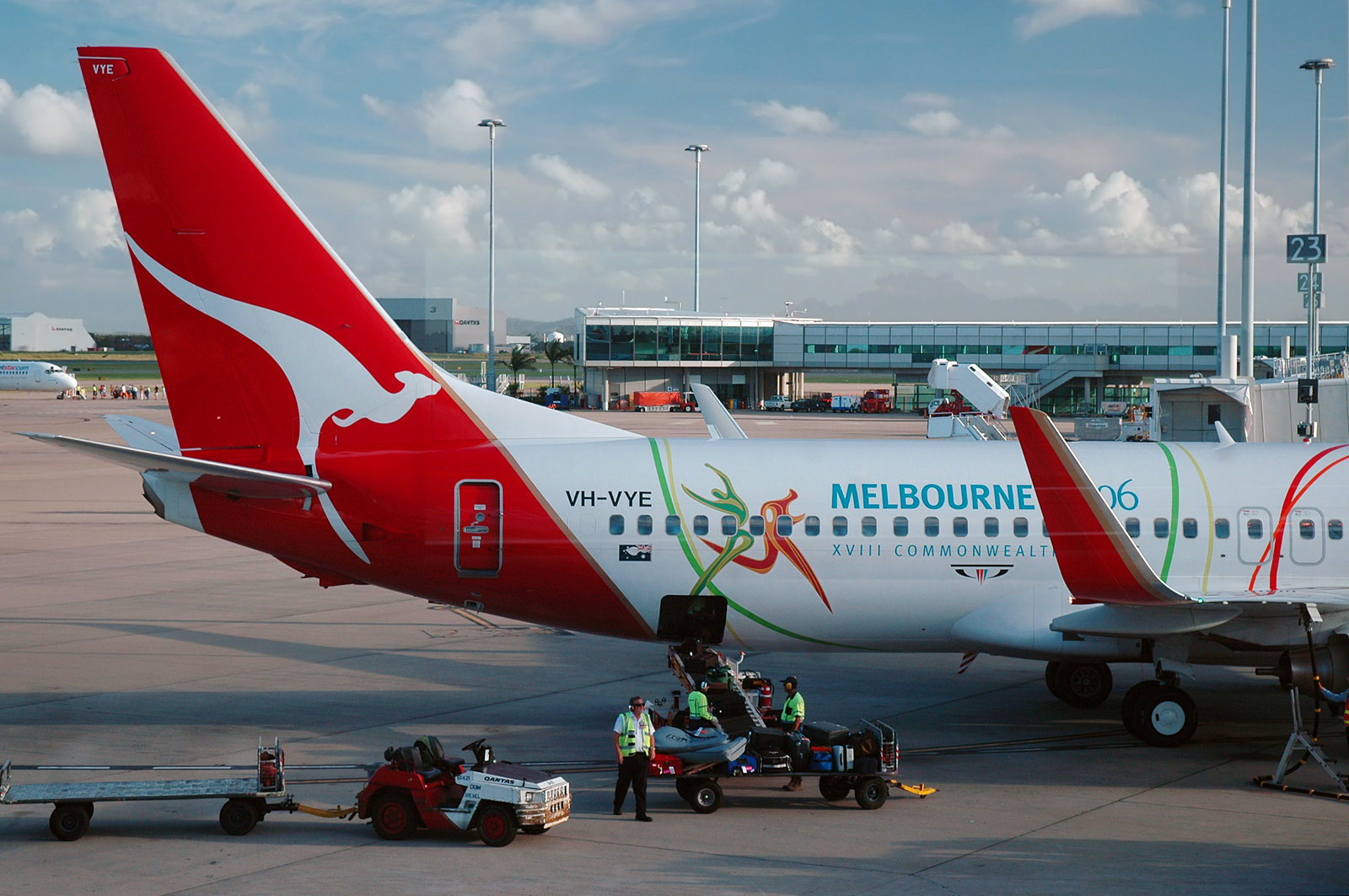
Qantas Airlines showcasing the logo of the 2006 Commonwealth Games.

=== Logo ===
The logo of the 2006 Commonwealth Games is an image of 2 figures, which represents sport and culture, achievement and excellence, while the colours green, yellow, and red represents celebratory, fresh and youthfully optimistic character of Melbourne city. The two figures in the logo joined to form a letter M, which is the initial letter of Melbourne, the games host city.

=== Mascot ===
Karak was the mascot for the 2006 Commonwealth Games. He was modelled on a red-tailed black cockatoo, a threatened species within the host country, Australia.

=== Sponsors ===
Sponsors of the 2006 Commonwealth Games
Partners
- BHP Billiton
- Microsoft
- National Australia Bank
- Qantas
- Tabcorp
- Telstra
- Toyota
- Visa Inc.
Sponsors
- Australia Post
- Cadbury-Schweppes
- Carlton & United Breweries (Crown Lager)
- Coates Hire
- De Bortoli Wines
- Holmesglen Institute of TAFE
- Hudson
- Konica Minolta
- MLC Limited
- Omega SA
- Peters Ice Cream
- PricewaterhouseCoopers
- Royal Automobile Club of Victoria
- Triple M
- Woolworths
Providers
- Accor
- Allens Arthur Robinson
- Australian Project & Consulting Services
- Bytecraft
- Cisco
- City of Ballarat
- CityLink
- Cleanevent
- DB Schenker
- Dell
- Finsbury Green Printing
- Hard Yakka
- HBA Health Insurance
- Interflora
- Melbourne Docklands
- Mistral Appliances
- Origin Energy
- Pacific Brands (Sleepmaker)
- Philips Medical Systems
- Pico Moreton Consortium
- Ramler Furniture
- Rehame
- Royal Australian Mint
- SCA (Tork)
- Snowhite Cleaning Services
- Ticketmaster
- TOWER Software
- Unilever (Rexona)
- Waterfront City
- Y&J Timber Flooring

== Controversies ==
=== Missing athletes ===
On 20 March 2006, it was reported that two athletes had gone missing from the Commonwealth Games village: Tanzanian boxer Omari Idd Kimweri and Bangladeshi runner Mohammad Tawhidul Islam.

On 22 March, it was reported that seven athletes from Sierra Leone (three women and four men) had also disappeared. A further seven Sierra Leonean athletes also went missing during the course of the Games, bringing the total runaway count to fourteen (two-thirds of the team). Victoria Police believed that they had fled to Sydney where the Sierra Leonean community is much larger than Melbourne's. Two hours before the closing ceremony on 26 March, officials from the Cameroon team reported to police that nine of their members had also vanished. These incidents were not without precedent: 27 athletes similarly disappeared from the 2002 Commonwealth Games in Manchester, England (21 from Sierra Leone, 5 from Bangladesh and one from Pakistan), and over 80 athletes and officials overstayed their visas after the 2000 Summer Olympics in Sydney.

On request of Sierra Leone officials, the Commonwealth Games Federation cancelled those athletes' Games accreditation, allowing the Australian Department of Immigration and Multicultural Affairs (DIMA) to cancel their visas at midnight on 27 March, and begin investigating their disappearance. At 7.20 am on that day, New South Wales Police located six of the Sierra Leonean athletes in a house at Freshwater, near Manly Beach in Sydney. All six indicated they wished to seek political asylum in Australia, and were granted bridging visas by DIMA while their refugee applications were arranged. The athletes claimed to have been subjected to violence and torture in their home country; seventeen-year-old Isha Conteh stated she could be forced into female genital cutting if she returned. On Tuesday 28 March, six further Sierra Leoneans turned themselves in to immigration authorities in Sydney and were also granted bridging visas.

Two of the missing Cameroonian athletes were later found in Perth, Western Australia.

=== The Stolenwealth Games ===
The Stolenwealth Games were protests at the 1982 and 2006 Commonwealth Games. People were protesting because they believed that the Commonwealth Games led to the erasure of indigenous people. There were also problems with land rights. These protests led to the creation of the Global Indigenous Games.

== See also ==
- 2005 Summer Deaflympics
- Festival Melbourne2006
- Commonwealth Games celebrated in Australia
  - 1938 Commonwealth Games – Sydney
  - 1962 Commonwealth Games – Perth
  - 1982 Commonwealth Games – Brisbane
  - 2018 Commonwealth Games – Gold Coast
- Commonwealth Youth Games celebrated in Australia
  - 2004 Commonwealth Youth Games – Bendigo
- Olympic Games celebrated in Australia
  - 1956 Summer Olympics – Melbourne
  - 2000 Summer Olympics – Sydney
  - 2032 Summer Olympics – Brisbane
- Paralympic Games celebrated in Australia
  - 2000 Summer Paralympics – Sydney
  - 2032 Summer Paralympics – Brisbane

Preceded by Manchester	Commonwealth Games; Melbourne; XVIII Commonwealth Games	Succeeded by Delhi
