= October 2010 in sports =

<<	October 2010					>>
Su	Mo	Tu	We	Th	Fr	Sa
					1	2
3	4	5	6	7	8	9
10	11	12	13	14	15	16
17	18	19	20	21	22	23
24	25	26	27	28	29	30
31
Sports

This list shows notable sports-related deaths, events, and notable outcomes that occurred in October of 2010.

== Deaths in October ==
- 4: Peter Warr
- 23: Fran Crippen
- 26: Paul the Octopus

== Sporting seasons ==
=== American football 2010 ===
- National Football League
- NCAA Division I FBS
- NCAA Division I FCS

=== Auto racing 2010 ===
- Formula One
- Sprint Cup
- World Rally Championship
- Nationwide Series
- Camping World Truck Series
- GP2 Series
- WTTC
- V8 Supercar
- Superleague Formula
- FIA GT1 World Championship
- World Series by Renault
- Deutsche Tourenwagen Masters
- Super GT

=== Baseball 2010 ===
- Major League Baseball
- Nippon Professional Baseball

=== Basketball 2010 ===
- NBA
- Euroleague
- EuroLeague Women
- Eurocup
- EuroChallenge
- France
- Germany
- Greece
- Israel
- Italy
- Philippines
  - Philippine Cup
- Russia
- Spain
- Turkey

=== Canadian football 2010 ===
- Canadian Football League

=== Football (soccer) 2010 ===
National teams competitions

- UEFA Euro 2012 qualifying
- 2011 FIFA Women's World Cup qualification
- 2012 Africa Cup of Nations qualification

International clubs competitions

- UEFA (Europe) Champions League
- Europa League
- UEFA Women's Champions League
- Copa Sudamericana
- AFC (Asia) Champions League
- AFC Cup
- CAF (Africa) Champions League
- CAF Confederation Cup
- CONCACAF (North & Central America) Champions League
- OFC (Oceania) Champions League

Domestic (national) competitions

- Argentina
- Australia
- Brazil
- England
- France
- Germany
- Iran
- Italy
- Japan
- Norway
- Russia
- Scotland
- Spain
- Major League Soccer (USA & Canada)
  - MLS Cup Playoffs

=== Golf 2010 ===
- PGA Tour
- European Tour
- LPGA Tour
- Champions Tour

=== Ice hockey 2010 ===
- National Hockey League
- Kontinental Hockey League
- Czech Extraliga
- Elitserien
- Canadian Hockey League:
  - OHL, QMJHL, WHL
- NCAA Division I men
- NCAA Division I women

=== Lacrosse 2010 ===
- Major League Lacrosse

=== Motorcycle racing 2010 ===
- Moto GP

=== Rugby league 2010 ===
- Four Nations

=== Rugby union 2010 ===
- 2011 Rugby World Cup qualifying
- Heineken Cup
- European Challenge Cup
- English Premiership
- Celtic League
- Top 14
- ITM Cup
- Currie Cup

=== Snooker ===
- Players Tour Championship

=== Winter sports ===
- Alpine Skiing World Cup
- Grand Prix of Figure Skating
- Short Track Speed Skating World Cup
- Snowboard World Cup
- AFL Grand Final

== Days of the month ==
=== October 31, 2010 (Sunday) ===
==== American football ====
- NFL, Week 8:
  - International Series in London: San Francisco 49ers 24, Denver Broncos 16
  - Detroit Lions 37, Washington Redskins 25
  - Jacksonville Jaguars 35, Dallas Cowboys 17
  - Miami Dolphins 22, Cincinnati Bengals 14
  - Kansas City Chiefs 13, Buffalo Bills 10 (OT)
  - St. Louis Rams 20, Carolina Panthers 10
  - Green Bay Packers 9, New York Jets 0
  - San Diego Chargers 33, Tennessee Titans 25
  - Tampa Bay Buccaneers 38, Arizona Cardinals 35
  - New England Patriots 28, Minnesota Vikings 18
  - Oakland Raiders 33, Seattle Seahawks 3
  - Sunday Night Football: New Orleans Saints 20, Pittsburgh Steelers 10
  - Byes: Atlanta Falcons, Baltimore Ravens, Chicago Bears, Cleveland Browns, New York Giants, Philadelphia Eagles

==== Auto racing ====
- Chase for the Sprint Cup:
  - AMP Energy Juice 500 in Talladega: (1) (Kansas) Clint Bowyer (Chevrolet; Richard Childress Racing) (2) (California) Kevin Harvick (Chevrolet; Richard Childress Racing) (3) (Colombia) Juan Pablo Montoya (Chevrolet; Earnhardt Ganassi Racing)
    - Drivers' championship standings (after 33 of 36 races): (1) (California) Jimmie Johnson (Chevrolet; Hendrick Motorsports) 6149 points (2) (Virginia) Denny Hamlin (Toyota; Joe Gibbs Racing) 6135 (3) Harvick 6111
- World Touring Car Championship:
  - Race of Japan:
    - Round 19: (1) Rob Huff (GBR) (Chevrolet; Chevrolet Cruze) (2) Yvan Muller (FRA) (Chevrolet; Chevrolet Cruze) (3) Norbert Michelisz (HUN) (Zengő-Dension Team; SEAT León)
    - Round 20: (1) Colin Turkington (GBR) (Team Aviva–COFCO / WSR; BMW 320si) (2) Muller (3) Huff
      - On November 16, BMW Team RBM drivers Augusto Farfus (BRA) and Andy Priaulx (GBR) were excluded from the results due to the revoking of a stewards' decision. (WTCC)
      - Drivers' championship standings (after 20 of 22 rounds): (1) Muller 301 points (2) Gabriele Tarquini (ITA) (SR-Sport; SEAT León) 246 (3) Priaulx 240
        - Muller wins his second world title.
      - Manufacturers' championship standings: (1) Chevrolet 645 points (2) SEAT Customers Technology 571 (3) BMW 544

==== Badminton ====
- BWF Super Series:
  - Denmark Super Series in Odense:
    - Men's singles: **Jan Ø. Jørgensen** (DEN) def. Taufik Hidayat (INA) 21–19, 21–19
    - Women's singles: **Wang Yihan** (CHN) def. Liu Xin (CHN) 21–14, 21–12
    - Men's doubles: **Mathias Boe** (DEN) / **Carsten Mogensen** (DEN) def. Markis Kido (INA) / Hendra Setiawan (INA) 21–13, 21–12
    - Women's doubles: **Miyuki Maeda** (JPN) / **Satoko Suetsuna** (JPN) def. Shizuka Matsuo (JPN) / Mami Naito (JPN) 21–17, 21–14
    - Mixed doubles: **Thomas Laybourn** (DEN) / **Kamilla Rytter Juhl** (DEN) def. Nathan Robertson (ENG) / Jenny Wallwork (ENG) 21–12, 12–21, 21–9

==== Baseball ====
- World Series:
  - Game 4, San Francisco Giants 4, Texas Rangers 0. Giants lead series 3–1.
- Japan Series:
  - Game 2, Chunichi Dragons 12, Chiba Lotte Marines 1. Series tied 1–1.

==== Cricket ====
- Pakistan vs South Africa in UAE:
  - 2nd ODI in Abu Dhabi: South Africa 286/8 (50 overs; Colin Ingram 100); Pakistan 289/9 (49.5 overs; Abdul Razzaq 109*). **Pakistan win by 1 wicket; 5-match series tied 1–1.**
- Sri Lanka in Australia:
  - Only T20I in Perth: Australia 133/8 (20 overs); Sri Lanka 135/3 (16.3 overs). **Sri Lanka win by 7 wickets; win the 1-match series 1–0.**

==== English billiards ====
- World Professional Championship in Leeds, England:
  - Final: Dhruv Sitwala (IND) 1204–1738 **Mike Russell** (QAT)
    - Russell wins the title for the 10th time.

==== Equestrianism ====
- Show jumping:
  - FEI World Cup Western European League:
    - 3rd competition in Lyon (CSI 5*-W): (gold) Meredith Michaels-Beerbaum (GER) on Checkmate (silver) Gerco Schröder (NED) on New Orleans (bronze) Rene Lopez (COL) on Noblesse des Tess
      - Standings (after 3 of 13 competitions): (1) Christian Ahlmann (GER) 40 points (2) Kevin Staut (FRA) 32 (3) Leon Thijssen (NED) 27
    - 5th competition in Hanover (CSI 3*): (gold) Eva Bitter (GER) on Satisfaction (silver) Hugo Simon (AUT) on Ukinda (bronze) Torben Köhlbrandt (GER) on Picadilly Princess
      - Standings (after 5 of 6 competitions): (1) Denis Lynch (IRL) 45 points (2) Heiko Schmidt (GER) 41 (3) Bitter 40

==== Figure skating ====
- ISU Grand Prix:
  - Skate Canada International in Kingston, Ontario:
    - Ice Dance: (gold) Vanessa Crone / Paul Poirier (CAN) 154.42 (silver) Sinead Kerr / John Kerr (GBR) 149.80 (bronze) Madison Chock / Greg Zuerlein (USA) 139.05
      - Standings (after 2 of 6 events): Meryl Davis / Charlie White (USA), Crone / Poirier 15 points (1 event), Kerr / Kerr, Kaitlyn Weaver / Andrew Poje (CAN) 13 (1), Chock / Zuerlein, Maia Shibutani / Alex Shibutani (USA) 11 (1).

==== Football (soccer) ====
- African Women's Championship in South Africa:
  - Group A: South Africa 2–1 Tanzania
- CONCACAF Women's Gold Cup in Cancún, Mexico: (teams in **bold** advance to the semifinals)
  - Group A:
    - **Canada** 8–0 Guyana
    - **Mexico** 2–0 Trinidad and Tobago
      - Standings (after 2 matches): Canada, Mexico 6 points, Trinidad and Tobago, Guyana 0.
- CAF Champions League Final, first leg:
  - TP Mazembe (Democratic Republic of the Congo) 5–0 (Tunisia) Espérance ST
- (United States) (Canada) MLS Cup Playoffs
  - Western Conference Semifinal, first leg in Seattle:
    - Seattle Sounders FC 0–1 Los Angeles Galaxy

==== Golf ====
- European Tour:
  - Andalucia Masters in Sotogrande, Spain:
    - Winner: Graeme McDowell (NIR) 281 (−3)
      - McDowell collects his third European Tour win of the season and seventh of his career.
- LPGA Tour:
  - LPGA Hana Bank Championship in Incheon, South Korea:
    - Winner: Na Yeon Choi (KOR) 206 (−10)
      - Choi successfully defends her title in the LPGA's annual stop in her homeland for her second LPGA title of the season and fourth of her career.
- Champions Tour:
  - AT&T Championship in San Antonio:
    - Winner: Rod Spittle (CAN) 201 (−12)^{PO}
      - Spittle, a Monday qualifier, defeats Jeff Sluman (USA) on the first playoff hole to win his first Champions Tour title.
- Other news: Lee Westwood (ENG) will become #1 in the Official World Golf Rankings, ending the five-year reign of Tiger Woods (USA), when the rankings are released tomorrow.

==== Korfball ====
- European Championship final round in Rotterdam, Netherlands:
  - 7th–8th places: Russia 15–23 **Portugal**
  - 5th–6th places: **Catalonia** 21–16 England
  - 3rd–4th places: Germany 11–18 (bronze) **Czech Republic**
  - Final: (silver) Belgium 21–25 (gold) **Netherlands**
    - The Netherlands win their fourth successive title.

==== Motorcycle racing ====
- Moto GP:
  - Portuguese Grand Prix in Estoril:
    - MotoGP: (1) Jorge Lorenzo (ESP) (Yamaha) (2) Valentino Rossi (ITA) (Yamaha) (3) Andrea Dovizioso (ITA) (Honda)
      - Riders' championship standings (after 17 of 18 rounds): (1) Lorenzo 358 points (2) Dani Pedrosa (ESP) (Honda) 236 (3) Rossi 217
      - Manufacturers' championship standings: (1) Yamaha 379 points (2) Honda 331 (3) Ducati 266
    - Moto2: (1) Stefan Bradl (GER) (Suter) (2) Alex Baldolini (ITA) (I.C.P.) (3) Alex de Angelis (SMR) (Motobi)
      - Riders' championship standings (after 16 of 17 rounds): (1) Toni Elías (ESP) (Moriwaki) 271 points (2) Julián Simón (ESP) (Suter) 185 (3) Andrea Iannone (ITA) (Speed Up) 179
      - Manufacturers' championship standings: (1) Suter 306 points (2) Moriwaki 296 (3) Speed Up 212
    - 125cc: (1) Marc Márquez (ESP) (Derbi) (2) Nicolás Terol (ESP) (Aprilia) (3) Bradley Smith (GBR) (Aprilia)
      - Riders' championship standings (after 16 of 17 rounds): (1) Márquez 297 points (2) Terol 280 (3) Pol Espargaró (ESP) (Derbi) 261
      - Manufacturers' championship standings: (1) Derbi 385 points (2) Aprilia 323 (3) Honda 23

==== Rugby league ====
- Four Nations: (teams in **bold** advance to the final)
  - Round two: **Australia** 34–14 England in Melbourne
    - Standings (after 2 matches): **New Zealand**, Australia 4 points, England, Papua New Guinea 0.

==== Short track speed skating ====
- World Cup 2 in Quebec City, Canada:
  - Men:
    - 500 m: (gold) François-Louis Tremblay (CAN) (silver) Liang Wenhao (CHN) (bronze) François Hamelin (CAN)
      - Standings (after 2 events): (1) Tremblay 1512 points (2) Liang 1440 (3) Simon Cho (USA) 1010.
    - 1000 m: (gold) Charles Hamelin (CAN) (silver) Travis Jayner (USA) (bronze) Guillaume Bastille (CAN)
      - Standings (after 3 events): (1) Thibaut Fauconnet (FRA) 2134 points (2) Anthony Lobello Jr. (USA) 1664 (3) Jayner 1440.
    - 5000 m relay: (gold) Canada (silver) United States (bronze) Italy
      - Standings (after 2 events): (1) Canada 2000 points (2) United States 1440 (3) Italy 1050.
  - Women:
    - 500 m: (gold) Marianne St-Gelais (CAN) (silver) Arianna Fontana (ITA) (bronze) Fan Kexin (CHN)
      - Standings (after 2 events): (1) St-Gelais 2000 points (2) Fontana 1600 (3) Valerie Lambert (CAN) 968.
    - 1000 m: (gold) Zhou Yang (CHN) (silver) Katherine Reutter (USA) (bronze) Elise Christie (GBR)
      - Standings (after 3 events): (1) Reutter 1800 points (2) Marianne St-Gelais (CAN) 1440 points (3) Lana Gehring (USA) 1328.
    - 3000 m relay: (gold) China (silver) Canada (bronze) United States
      - Standings (after 2 events): (1) China 2000 points (2) Canada, United States 1440.

==== Snooker ====
- Euro Players Tour Championship:
  - Event 4 in Gloucester:
    - Final: **Stephen Lee** (ENG) 4–2 Stephen Maguire (SCO)
      - Lee wins his fifth professional title.
      - Order of Merit (after 10 of 12 events): (1) Mark Selby (ENG) 19,400 (2) Barry Pinches (ENG) 17,500 (3) Judd Trump (ENG) and Mark Williams (WAL) 16,600

==== Tennis ====
- WTA Tour Championships in Doha, Qatar, day 6:
  - Singles Final: **Kim Clijsters** (BEL) def. Caroline Wozniacki (DEN) 6–3, 5–7, 6–3
    - Clijsters wins her third Tour Championships and the 40th title of her career.
  - Doubles Final: **Gisela Dulko** (ARG)/**Flavia Pennetta** (ITA) def. Květa Peschke (CZE)/Katarina Srebotnik (SVN) 7–5, 6–4
    - Dulko wins her eighth title of the season and 16th of her career, while Pennetta wins her seventh title of the season and 13th of her career.
- ATP World Tour:
  - St. Petersburg Open:
    - Final: **Mikhail Kukushkin** (KAZ) def. Mikhail Youzhny (RUS) 6–3, 7–6(2)
      - Kukushkin wins his first career title.
  - Bank Austria-TennisTrophy:
    - Final: **Jürgen Melzer** (AUT) def. Andreas Haider-Maurer (AUT) 6–7(10), 7–6(4), 6–4
      - Melzer wins the third title of his career.
  - Open Sud de France:
    - Final: **Gaël Monfils** (FRA) def. Ivan Ljubičić (CRO) 6–2, 5–7, 6–1
      - Monfils wins the third title of his career.

==== Volleyball ====
- Women's World Championship in Japan: (teams in **bold** advance to the second round)
  - Pool A in Tokyo:
    - Peru 1–3 **Serbia**
    - Poland 3–0 Costa Rica
    - Algeria 0–3 **Japan**
      - Standings (after 3 matches): Japan, Serbia 6 points, Poland, Peru, Costa Rica 4, Algeria 3.
  - Pool B in Hamamatsu:
    - Puerto Rico 0–3 Czech Republic
    - **Italy** 3–0 Kenya
    - **Brazil** 3–0 Netherlands
      - Standings (after 3 matches): Brazil, Italy 6 points, Czech Republic, Netherlands, Puerto Rico 4, Kenya 3.
  - Pool C in Matsumoto:
    - Kazakhstan 2–3 Cuba
    - Croatia 0–3 Thailand
    - Germany 0–3 **United States**
      - Standings (after 3 matches): USA 6 points, Thailand, Germany 5, Cuba, Croatia 4, Kazakhstan 3.
  - Pool D in Osaka:
    - Turkey 3–2 Dominican Republic
    - Canada 0–3 **Russia**
    - **South Korea** 3–0 China
      - Standings (after 3 matches): Russia, South Korea 6 points, Turkey 5, China 4, Dominican Republic, Canada 3.

=== October 30, 2010 (Saturday) ===
==== American football ====
- NCAA (unbeaten teams in **bold**):
  - BCS Top 10:
    - (1) **Auburn** 51, Mississippi 31
    - (2) **Oregon** 53, USC 32
    - (4) **TCU** 48, UNLV 6
    - (18) Iowa 37, (5) Michigan State 6
    - (14) Nebraska 31, (6) Missouri 17
    - (8) **Utah** 28, Air Force 23
    - (9) Oklahoma 43, Colorado 10
  - Played earlier this week: (3) **Boise State**
  - Idle: (7) Alabama, (10) Wisconsin
  - Other games: Virginia 24, (22) Miami 19

==== Baseball ====
- World Series:
  - Game 3, Texas Rangers 4, San Francisco Giants 2. Giants lead series 2–1.
- Japan Series:
  - Game 1, Chiba Lotte Marines 5, Chunichi Dragons 2. Marines lead series 1–0.

==== Figure skating ====
- ISU Grand Prix:
  - Skate Canada International in Kingston, Ontario:
    - Pairs: (gold) Lubov Iliushechkina / Nodari Maisuradze (RUS) 171.40 (silver) Kirsten Moore-Towers / Dylan Moscovitch (CAN) 170.92 (bronze) Paige Lawrence / Rudi Swiegers (CAN) 161.15
      - Standings (after 2 of 6 events): Pang Qing / Tong Jian (CHN), Iliushechkina / Maisuradze 15 points (1 event), Vera Bazarova / Yuri Larionov (RUS), Moore-Towers / Moscovitch 13 (1), Lawrence / Swiegers, Narumi Takahashi / Mervin Tran (JPN) 11 (1).
    - Men: (gold) Patrick Chan (CAN) 239.52 (silver) Nobunari Oda (JPN) 236.52 (bronze) Adam Rippon (USA) 233.04
      - Standings (after 2 of 6 events): Chan, Daisuke Takahashi (JPN) 15 points (1 event), Oda, Jeremy Abbott (USA) 13 (1), Rippon, Florent Amodio (FRA) 11 (1).
    - Ladies: (gold) Alissa Czisny (USA) 172.37 (silver) Ksenia Makarova (RUS) 165.00 (bronze) Amélie Lacoste (CAN) 157.26
      - Standings (after 2 of 6 events): Czisny, Carolina Kostner (ITA) 15 points (1 event), Makarova, Rachael Flatt (USA) 13 (1), Lacoste, Kanako Murakami (JPN) 11 (1).

==== Football (soccer) ====
- CONCACAF Women's Gold Cup in Cancún, Mexico: (teams in **bold** advance to the semifinals)
  - Group B:
    - Haiti 0–3 **Costa Rica**
    - **United States** 9–0 Guatemala
      - Standings (after 2 matches): United States, Costa Rica 6 points, Haiti, Guatemala 0.
- CAF Confederation Cup Semi-finals, first leg:
  - CS Sfaxien (Tunisia) 1–0 (Sudan) Al-Hilal
- (United States) (Canada) MLS Cup Playoffs
  - Western Conference Semifinal, first leg in Frisco, Texas:
    - FC Dallas 2–1 Real Salt Lake
  - Eastern Conference Semifinal, first leg in Santa Clara, California:
    - San Jose Earthquakes 0–1 New York Red Bulls

==== Korfball ====
- European Championship final round in Rotterdam, Netherlands:
  - 15th–16th places: **Scotland** 16–12 Turkey
  - 13th–14th places: **Slovakia** 21–14 Serbia
  - 11th–12th places:Ireland 10–11 **Wales**
  - 9th–10th places: **Poland** 20–19 (g.g.) Hungary

==== Power Snooker ====
- Power Snooker in London, England:
  - Third place: **Ali Carter** (ENG) 299–102 Shaun Murphy (ENG)
  - Final: **Ronnie O'Sullivan** (ENG) 572–258 Ding Junhui (CHN)

==== Rugby league ====
- Four Nations:
  - Round two: New Zealand 76–12 Papua New Guinea in Rotorua
    - Standings: New Zealand 4 points (2 matches), Australia 2 (1), England 0 (1), Papua New Guinea 0 (2).

==== Rugby union ====
- End of year tests:
  - Week 2:
    - Japan 10–13 Samoa in Tokyo
    - Australia 26–24 New Zealand in Hong Kong
      - The Wallabies end a 10-match losing streak to the All Blacks, whose streak of Test wins ends at 15.
    - Russia 6–32 Argentina XV in Moscow
- (New Zealand) ITM Cup semifinal in Auckland:
  - Auckland 37–38 **Waikato**
- (South Africa) Currie Cup Final in Durban:
  - **Sharks** 30–10 Western Province
    - The Sharks win their sixth Currie Cup.

==== Short track speed skating ====
- World Cup 2 in Quebec City, Canada:
  - Men:
    - 1000 m: (gold) Thibaut Fauconnet (FRA) (silver) Yu Yongjun (CHN) (bronze) Anthony Lobello Jr. (USA)
      - Standings (after 2 events): (1) Fauconnet 2000 points (2) Lobello 1152 (3) Yu, Michael Gilday (CAN) 800.
    - 1500 m: (gold) Michael Gilday (CAN) (silver) Nicola Rodigari (ITA) (bronze) Maxime Chataignier (FRA)
      - Standings (after 3 events): (1) Guillaume Bastille (CAN) 1747 points (2) Chataignier 1280 (3) Jeff Simon (USA) 1210.
  - Women:
    - 1000 m: (gold) Lana Gehring (USA) (silver) Arianna Fontana (ITA) (bronze) Marianne St-Gelais (CAN)
      - Standings (after 2 events): (1) St-Gelais 1440 points (2) Liu Qiuhong (CHN) 1050 (3) Gehring, Katherine Reutter (USA) 1000.
    - 1500 m: (gold) Zhou Yang (CHN) (silver) Katherine Reutter (USA) (bronze) Biba Sakurai (JPN)
      - Standings (after 3 events): (1) Zhou 2440 points (2) Reutter 1800 (3) Marie-Ève Drolet (CAN) 1210.

==== Snowboarding ====
- World Cup in London, United Kingdom:
  - Big Air: (gold) Marko Grilc (SLO) (silver) Staale Sandbech (NOR) (bronze) Seppe Smits (BEL)

==== Tennis ====
- WTA Tour Championships in Doha, Qatar, day 5:
  - Singles Semifinals:
    - **Kim Clijsters** (BEL) def. Samantha Stosur (AUS) 7–6(3), 6–1
    - **Caroline Wozniacki** (DEN) def. Vera Zvonareva (RUS) 7–5, 6–0
  - Doubles Semifinals:
    - **Květa Peschke** (CZE)/**Katarina Srebotnik** (SVN) def. Lisa Raymond (USA)/Rennae Stubbs (AUS) 7–6(6), 6–3
    - **Gisela Dulko** (ARG)/**Flavia Pennetta** (ITA) def. Vania King (USA)/Yaroslava Shvedova (KAZ) 6–4, 6–4

==== Volleyball ====
- Women's World Championship in Japan:
  - Pool A in Tokyo:
    - Costa Rica 3–0 Algeria
    - Serbia 3–1 Poland
    - Japan 3–1 Peru
      - Standings (after 2 games): Serbia, Japan 4 points, Peru, Costa Rica 3, Poland, Algeria 2.
  - Pool B in Hamamatsu:
    - Czech Republic 2–3 Brazil
    - Kenya 0–3 Puerto Rico
    - Netherlands 2–3 Italy
      - Standings (after 2 games): Brazil, Italy 4 points, Netherlands, Puerto Rico 3, Czech Republic, Kenya 2.
  - Pool C in Matsumoto:
    - United States 3–0 Croatia
    - Thailand 3–1 Kazakhstan
    - Cuba 0–3 Germany
      - Standings (after 2 games): Germany, USA 4 points, Thailand, Croatia 3, Cuba, Kazakhstan 2.
  - Pool D in Osaka:
    - Russia 3–1 Turkey
    - Dominican Republic 0–3 South Korea
    - China 3–0 Canada
      - Standings (after 2 games): Russia, South Korea 4 points, China, Turkey 3, Dominican Republic, Canada 2.

=== October 29, 2010 (Friday) ===
==== Cricket ====
- Pakistan vs South Africa in UAE:
  - 1st ODI in Abu Dhabi: Pakistan 203 (49 overs); South Africa 207/2 (39.3 overs). **South Africa win by 8 wickets; lead 5-match series 1–0.**

==== Equestrianism ====
- Dressage:
  - FEI World Cup Western European League:
    - 2nd competition in Lyon (CSI-W): (gold) Isabell Werth (GER) on Warum Nicht FRH (silver) Ulla Salzgeber (GER) on Herzruf's Erbe (bronze) Valentina Truppa (ITA) on Chablis
      - Standings (after 2 of 10 competitions, including points from Central European League): (1) Werth 40 points (2) Catherine Haddad (CAN) 39 (3) Salzgeber 37

==== Figure skating ====
- ISU Grand Prix:
  - Skate Canada International in Kingston, Ontario:
    - Ladies Short Program: (1) Cynthia Phaneuf (CAN) 58.24 (2) Ksenia Makarova (RUS) 57.90 (3) Agnes Zawadzki (USA) 56.29
    - Pairs Short Program: (1) Lubov Iliushechkina / Nodari Maisuradze (RUS) 60.72 (2) Marissa Castelli / Simon Shnapir (USA) 56.34 (3) Paige Lawrence / Rudi Swiegers (CAN) 56.14
    - Men Short Program: (1) Nobunari Oda (JPN) 81.37 (2) Kevin Reynolds (CAN) 80.09 (3) Adam Rippon (USA) 77.53
    - Short Dance: (1) Sinead Kerr / John Kerr (GBR) 62.96 (2) Vanessa Crone / Paul Poirier (CAN) 62.95 (3) Pernelle Carron / Lloyd Jones (FRA) 54.43

==== Football (soccer) ====
- CONCACAF Women's Gold Cup in Cancún, Mexico:
  - Group A:
    - Trinidad and Tobago 0–1 Canada
    - Mexico 7–2 Guyana
- CAF Confederation Cup Semi-finals, first leg:
  - Ittihad (Libya) 1–2 (Morocco) FUS Rabat
- (Republic of Ireland) League of Ireland Premier Division, matchday 36: (team in **bold** qualify for the 2011–12 UEFA Champions League, teams in italics qualify for the 2011–12 UEFA Europa League)
  - Bohemians 3–1 Dundalk
  - Bray 2–2 **Shamrock Rovers**
    - Final standings: Shamrock Rovers, Bohemians 67 points, Sligo Rovers 63, Sporting Fingal 62.
    - Shamrock Rovers win their 16th title and first in 16 years.

==== Korfball ====
- European Championship final round in Rotterdam, Netherlands:
  - 5th–8th places:
    - Russia 15–19 **Catalonia**
    - **England** 17–15 Portugal
  - Semifinals:
    - Germany 11–34 **Belgium**
    - Czech Republic 11–36 **Netherlands**

==== Rugby union ====
- (New Zealand) ITM Cup semifinal in Christchurch:
  - **Canterbury** 57–41 Wellington

==== Tennis ====
- WTA Tour Championships in Doha, Qatar, day 4: (players in **bold** advance to semifinals)
  - White Group:
    - **Vera Zvonareva** (RUS) def. **Kim Clijsters** (BEL) 6–4, 7–5
    - Victoria Azarenka (BLR) def. Jelena Janković (SRB) 6–4, 6–1
      - Final standings: Zvonareva 3–0, Clijsters 2–1, Azarenka 1–2, Janković 0–3.
  - Maroon Group: Francesca Schiavone (ITA) def. Elena Dementieva (RUS) 6–4, 6–2
    - Final standings: **Samantha Stosur** (AUS), **Caroline Wozniacki** (DEN) 2–1, Schiavone, Dementieva 1–2.
    - After the match, Dementieva announces her retirement from professional tennis. (Eurosport)

==== Volleyball ====
- Women's World Championship in Japan:
  - Pool A in Tokyo:
    - Peru 3–0 Algeria
    - Serbia 3–0 Costa Rica
    - Poland 2–3 Japan
  - Pool B in Hamamatsu:
    - Brazil 3–0 Kenya
    - Czech Republic 0–3 Netherlands
    - Puerto Rico 0–3 Italy
  - Pool C in Matsumoto:
    - Germany 3–0 Kazakhstan
    - United States 3–1 Thailand
    - Croatia 3–0 Cuba
  - Pool D in Osaka:
    - Russia 3–1 Dominican Republic
    - Canada 0–3 South Korea
    - Turkey 3–1 China

=== October 28, 2010 (Thursday) ===
==== American football ====
- NCAA BCS Top 25:
  - North Carolina State 28, (16) Florida State 24

==== Baseball ====
- World Series:
  - Game 2: San Francisco Giants 9, Texas Rangers 0. Giants lead series 2–0.

==== Basketball ====
- Euroleague, matchday 2:
  - Group A: Maccabi Tel Aviv (Israel) 86–70 (Lithuania) Žalgiris Kaunas
  - Group B: Real Madrid (Spain) 68–56 (Spain) Unicaja Málaga
  - Group C: KK Cibona Zagreb (Croatia) 68–73 (Turkey) Fenerbahçe Ülker
  - Group D:
    - Panathinaikos Athens (Greece) 74–60 (Russia) CSKA Moscow
    - Armani Jeans Milano (Italy) 72–76 (Slovenia) Union Olimpija Ljubljana

==== Football (soccer) ====
- CONCACAF Women's Gold Cup in Cancún, Mexico:
  - Group B:
    - Costa Rica 1–0 Guatemala
    - United States 5–0 Haiti
- (United States) (Canada) MLS Cup Playoffs
  - Eastern Conference Semifinal, first leg in Commerce City, Colorado:
    - Colorado Rapids 1–0 Columbus Crew

==== Korfball ====
- European Championship final round in Rotterdam, Netherlands:
  - 13th–16th places:
    - **Slovakia** 20–15 Scotland
    - **Serbia** 23–12 Turkey
  - 9th–12th places:
    - **Hungary** 18–14 Wales
    - Ireland 18–21 **Poland**

==== Snooker ====
- Premier League Snooker – League phase in Penrith, Cumbria: (players in ~~strike~~ are eliminated)
  - Marco Fu (HKG) 5–1 ~~Ding Junhui~~ (CHN)
  - Ronnie O'Sullivan (ENG) 4–2 Mark Williams (WAL)
    - Standings: Fu 6 points (5 matches), Williams 5 (5), O'Sullivan 5 (4), Mark Selby (ENG) 4 (4), Ding 4 (6), Neil Robertson (AUS), Shaun Murphy (ENG) 3 (3).

==== Tennis ====
- WTA Tour Championships in Doha, Qatar, day 3: (players in **bold** advance to semifinals)
  - White Group: **Kim Clijsters** (BEL) def. Victoria Azarenka (BLR) 6–4, 5–7, 6–1
    - Standings: **Vera Zvonareva** (RUS), Clijsters 2–0, Azarenka, Jelena Janković (SRB) 0–2.
  - Maroon Group:
    - Elena Dementieva (RUS) def. **Samantha Stosur** (AUS) 4–6, 6–4, 7–6(4)
    - **Caroline Wozniacki** (DEN) def. Francesca Schiavone (ITA) 3–6, 6–1, 6–1
      - Standings: Stosur, Wozniacki 2–1, Dementieva 1–1, Schiavone 0–2.

=== October 27, 2010 (Wednesday) ===
==== Baseball ====
- World Series:
  - Game 1: San Francisco Giants 11, Texas Rangers 7. Giants lead series 1–0.

==== Basketball ====
- Euroleague, matchday 2:
  - Group A:
    - Asseco Prokom Gdynia (Poland) 73–80 (Spain) Caja Laboral
    - Partizan Belgrade (Serbia) 72–68 (Russia) Khimki Moscow
  - Group B:
    - Brose Baskets (Germany) 73–61 (Greece) Olympiacos Piraeus
    - Spirou Basket (Belgium) 55–64 (Italy) Virtus Roma
  - Group C:
    - Lietuvos Rytas (Lithuania) 75–79 (Italy) Montepaschi Siena
    - Cholet Basket (France) 77–84 (Spain) Regal FC Barcelona
  - Group D: Efes Pilsen Istanbul (Turkey) 79–63 (Spain) Power Electronics Valencia

==== Cricket ====
- Pakistan vs South Africa in UAE:
  - 2nd T20I in Abu Dhabi: Pakistan 120/9 (20 overs); South Africa 125/4 (18.4 overs). **South Africa win by 6 wickets; win 2-match series 2–0.**

==== Football (soccer) ====
- 2011 FIFA Women's World Cup qualification (UEFA):
  - Repechage II, second leg (first leg score in parentheses):
    - Switzerland 2–4 (0–1) **Italy**. Italy win 5–2 on aggregate and advance to the UEFA-CONCACAF play-off.
- Copa Sudamericana Quarterfinals, first leg:
  - Goiás (Brazil) 2–2 (Brazil) Avaí
  - Atlético Mineiro (Brazil) 1–1 (Brazil) Palmeiras

==== Korfball ====
- European Championship second round in Rotterdam, Netherlands:
  - Quarterfinals: (teams in **bold** advance to semifinals)
    - Group E:
      - **Germany** 15–11 England
      - **Netherlands** 39–12 Russia
        - Final standings: Netherlands 9 points, Germany 6, Russia 3, England 0.
    - Group F:
      - Catalonia 12–25 Portugal
      - **Belgium** 35–15 **Czech Republic**
        - Final standings: Belgium 9 points, Czech Republic 5, Portugal 3, Catalonia 1.
  - 9th–16th classification: (teams in **bold** advance to 9th–12th classification)
    - Group G:
      - **Hungary** 14–13 **Ireland**
      - Serbia 13–15 Slovakia
        - Final standings: Hungary 9 points, Ireland 5, Slovakia 4, Serbia 0.
    - Group H:
      - **Poland** 17–12 **Wales**
      - Scotland 12–15 Turkey
        - Final standings: Poland 9 points, Wales 6, Turkey 3, Scotland 0.

==== Tennis ====
- WTA Tour Championships in Doha, Qatar, day 2:
  - White Group:
    - Vera Zvonareva (RUS) def. Victoria Azarenka (BLR) 7–6(4), 6–4
    - Kim Clijsters (BEL) def. Jelena Janković (SRB) 6–2, 6–3
      - Standings: Zvonareva 2–0, Clijsters 1–0, Azarenka 0–1, Janković 0–2.
  - Maroon Group: Samantha Stosur (AUS) def. Caroline Wozniacki (DEN) 6–4, 6–3
    - Standings: Stosur 2–0, Wozniacki 1–1, Francesca Schiavone (ITA), Elena Dementieva (RUS) 0–1.

=== October 26, 2010 (Tuesday) ===
==== American football ====
- NCAA BCS Top 10 (unbeaten team in **bold**):
  - (3) **Boise State** 49, Louisiana Tech 20

==== Basketball ====
- NBA season openers:
  - Boston Celtics 88, Miami Heat 80
  - Portland Trail Blazers 106, Phoenix Suns 92
  - Los Angeles Lakers 112, Houston Rockets 110

==== Cricket ====
- Pakistan vs South Africa in UAE:
  - 1st T20I in Abu Dhabi: Pakistan 119 (19.5 overs); South Africa 120/4 (18.2 overs). **South Africa win by 6 wickets; lead 2-match series 1–0.**

==== Football (soccer) ====
- Caribbean Championship Qualifying Group Stage Two: (teams in **bold** advance to the Final Tournament)
  - Group E in St. George's, Grenada:
    - Puerto Rico 0–1 Saint Kitts and Nevis
    - **Grenada** 0–3 **Guadeloupe**
      - Final standings: Guadeloupe 9 points, Grenada 6, Saint Kitts and Nevis 3, Puerto Rico 0.

==== Korfball ====
- European Championship second round in Rotterdam, Netherlands:
  - Quarterfinals:
    - Group E:
      - Germany 26–25 Russia
      - Netherlands 34–6 England
        - Standings (after 2 games): Netherlands 6 points, Russia, Germany 3, England 0.
    - Group F:
      - Catalonia 17–18 (g.g.) Czech Republic
      - Belgium 32–16 Portugal
        - Standings (after 2 games): Belgium 6 points, Czech Republic 5, Catalonia 1, Portugal 0.
  - 9th–16th classification:
    - Group G:
      - Hungary 17–8 Slovakia
      - Serbia 10–16 Ireland
        - Standings (after 2 games): Hungary 6 points, Ireland 5, Slovakia 1, Serbia 0.
    - Group H:
      - Poland 23–7 Turkey
      - Scotland 15–18 Wales
        - Standings (after 2 games): Poland, Wales 6 points, Turkey, Scotland 0.

==== Tennis ====
- WTA Tour Championships in Doha, Qatar, day 1:
  - White Group: Vera Zvonareva (RUS) def. Jelena Janković (SRB) 6–3, 6–0
  - Maroon Group:
    - Caroline Wozniacki (DEN) def. Elena Dementieva (RUS) 6–1, 6–1
    - Samantha Stosur (AUS) def. Francesca Schiavone (ITA) 6–4, 6–4

=== October 25, 2010 (Monday) ===
==== American football ====
- NFL, Week 7:
  - Monday Night Football: New York Giants 41, Dallas Cowboys 35

=== October 24, 2010 (Sunday) ===
==== Alpine skiing ====
- Men's World Cup:
  - Giant slalom in Sölden, Austria: Cancelled after first run due to fog and wind.

==== American football ====
- NFL, Week 7:
  - Carolina Panthers 23, San Francisco 49ers 20
  - Tampa Bay Buccaneers 18, St. Louis Rams 17
  - Baltimore Ravens 37, Buffalo Bills 34 (OT)
  - Cleveland Browns 30, New Orleans Saints 17
  - Pittsburgh Steelers 23, Miami Dolphins 22
  - Tennessee Titans 37, Philadelphia Eagles 19
  - Kansas City Chiefs 42, Jacksonville Jaguars 20
  - Washington Redskins 17, Chicago Bears 14
  - Atlanta Falcons 39, Cincinnati Bengals 32
  - Seattle Seahawks 22, Arizona Cardinals 10
  - New England Patriots 23, San Diego Chargers 20
  - Oakland Raiders 59, Denver Broncos 14
    - The Raiders tally a franchise record for most points in a game, with Darren McFadden scoring four touchdowns.
  - Sunday Night Football: Green Bay Packers 28, Minnesota Vikings 24
  - Byes: Detroit Lions, Indianapolis Colts, New York Jets, Houston Texans

==== Auto racing ====
- Formula One:
  - Korean Grand Prix in Yeongam: (1) Fernando Alonso (ESP) (Ferrari) (2) Lewis Hamilton (GBR) (McLaren–Mercedes) (3) Felipe Massa (BRA) (Ferrari)
    - Drivers' championship standings (after 17 of 19 races): (1) Alonso 231 points (2) Mark Webber (AUS) (Red Bull–Renault) 220 (3) Hamilton 210
    - Constructors' championship standings: (1) Red Bull 426 points (2) McLaren 399 (3) Ferrari 374
- Chase for the Sprint Cup:
  - TUMS Fast Relief 500 in Martinsville: (1) (Virginia) Denny Hamlin (Toyota; Joe Gibbs Racing) (2) (Arkansas) Mark Martin (Chevrolet; Hendrick Motorsports) (3) (California) Kevin Harvick (Chevrolet; Richard Childress Racing)
    - Drivers' championship standings (after 32 of 36 races): (1) (California) Jimmie Johnson (Chevrolet; Hendrick Motorsports) 5998 points (2) Hamlin 5992 (3) Harvick 5936
- V8 Supercars:
  - Armor All Gold Coast 600 in Surfers Paradise, Queensland: (1) Jamie Whincup (AUS)/Steve Owen (AUS) (Holden Commodore) (2) Shane van Gisbergen (NZL)/John McIntyre (NZL) (Ford Falcon) (3) Mark Winterbottom (AUS)/Luke Youlden (AUS) (Ford Falcon)
    - Drivers' championship standings (after 20 of 26 races): (1) James Courtney (AUS) (Ford Falcon) 2521 points (2) Whincup 2450 (3) Craig Lowndes (AUS) (Holden Commodore) 2255
- World Rally Championship:
  - Rally Catalunya in Salou: (1) Sébastien Loeb (FRA)/Daniel Elena (MON) (Citroën C4 WRC) (2) Petter Solberg (NOR)/Chris Patterson (GBR) (Citroën C4 WRC) (3) Dani Sordo (ESP)/Diego Vallejo (ESP) (Citroën C4 WRC)
    - Drivers' championship standings (after 12 of 13 rounds): (1) Loeb 251 points (2) Sébastien Ogier (FRA) (Citroën C4 WRC) 167 (3) Jari-Matti Latvala (FIN) (Ford Focus RS WRC 09) 156

==== Cricket ====
- Australia in India:
  - 3rd ODI in Margao: India vs. Australia. **Match abandoned without a ball bowled; India win 3-match series 1–0.**

==== Equestrianism ====
- Show jumping:
  - FEI World Cup Western European League:
    - 2nd competition in Helsinki (CSI 5*-W): (gold) Christian Ahlmann (GER) on Taloubet Z (silver) Philipp Weishaupt (GER) on Catoki (bronze) Leon Thijssen (NED) on Tyson
      - Standings (after 2 of 13 competitions): (1) Ahlmann 40 points (2) Thijssen 27 (3) Weishaupt 24
- Dressage:
  - FEI World Cup Western European League:
    - 1st competition in Odense (CSI-W): (gold) Isabell Werth (GER) on Satchmo (silver) Nathalie zu Sayn-Wittgenstein-Berleburg (DEN) on Digby (bronze) Hans Peter Minderhoud (NED) on Tango

==== Figure skating ====
- ISU Grand Prix:
  - NHK Trophy in Nagoya, Japan:
    - Men: (gold) Daisuke Takahashi (JPN) 234.79 (silver) Jeremy Abbott (USA) 218.19 (bronze) Florent Amodio (FRA) 213.77

==== Football (soccer) ====
- Caribbean Championship Qualifying Group Stage Two: (teams in **bold** advance for the Final Tournament)
  - Group E in St. George's, Grenada:
    - **Guadeloupe** 3–2 Puerto Rico
    - **Grenada** 2–0 Saint Kitts and Nevis
      - Standings (after 2 matches): Grenada, Guadeloupe 6 points, Puerto Rico, Saint Kitts and Nevis 0.
- OFC Champions League Group stage, matchday 1:
  - Group B: Waitakere United (New Zealand) 3–1 (French Polynesia) AS Tefana

==== Futsal ====
- Grand Prix de Futsal in Anápolis, Brazil:
  - Final: (gold) **Spain** 2–1 (silver) Brazil
    - Spain win the title for the first time and stop Brazil's winning streak at five.

==== Golf ====
- PGA Tour Fall Series:
  - Justin Timberlake Shriners Hospitals for Children Open in Las Vegas, Nevada:
    - Winner: Jonathan Byrd (USA) 263 (−21)^{PO}
      - Byrd wins his fourth PGA Tour title with a hole in one on the fourth playoff hole, defeating Martin Laird (SCO) and Cameron Percy (AUS).
- European Tour:
  - Castelló Masters Costa Azahar in Castellón, Spain:
    - Winner: Matteo Manassero (ITA) 268 (−16)
      - Manassero wins his first European Tour title, and becomes the youngest player to win on the Tour, at the age of 17 years, 188 days.
- LPGA Tour:
  - Sime Darby LPGA Malaysia in Kuala Lumpur, Malaysia:
    - Winner: Jimin Kang (KOR) 204 (−9)
      - Kang wins her second LPGA Tour title.
- Champions Tour:
  - Administaff Small Business Classic in The Woodlands, Texas:
    - Winner: Fred Couples (USA) 199 (−17)
      - Couples wins for the fourth time in his first Champions Tour season.

==== Gymnastics ====
- World Artistic Gymnastics Championships in Rotterdam, Netherlands:
  - Men's:
    - Vault: (gold) Thomas Bouhail (FRA) 16.449 points (silver) Anton Golotsutskov (RUS) 16.366 (bronze) Dzmitry Kaspiarovich (BLR) 16.316
    - Parallel bars: (gold) Feng Zhe (CHN) 15.966 points (silver) Teng Haibin (CHN) 15.616 (bronze) Kōhei Uchimura (JPN) 15.500
    - Horizontal bar: (gold) Zhang Chenglong (CHN) 16.166 points (silver) Epke Zonderland (NED) 16.033 (bronze) Fabian Hambüchen (GER) 15.966
  - Women's:
    - Balance beam: (gold) Ana Porgras (ROU) 15.366 points (silver) Rebecca Bross (USA) 15.233 (silver) Deng Linlin (CHN) 15.233
    - Floor: (gold) Lauren Mitchell (AUS) 14.833 points (silver) Aliya Mustafina (RUS) 14.766 (silver) Diana Chelaru (ROU) 14.766

==== Korfball ====
- European Championship first round in the Netherlands, matchday 3: (teams in **bold** advance to second round)
  - Group A in Leeuwarden:
    - **Germany** 21–11 Hungary
    - **Netherlands** 45–8 Serbia
      - Final standings: Netherlands 9 points, Germany 6, Hungary 3, Serbia 0.
  - Group B in Tilburg:
    - **Catalonia** 23–5 Poland
    - **Belgium** 35–9 Scotland
      - Final standings: Belgium 9 points, Catalonia 6, Poland 3, Scotland 0.
  - Group C in Almelo:
    - Wales 17–13 Turkey
    - **Czech Republic** 20–17 **Portugal**
      - Final standings: Czech Republic 9 points, Portugal 6, Wales 3, Turkey 0.
  - Group D in The Hague:
    - Slovakia 13–14 (g.g.) Ireland
    - **Russia** 26–24 **England**
      - Final standings: Russia 9 points, England 6, Ireland 2, Slovakia 1.

==== Rugby league ====
- Four Nations:
  - Round one: Australia 42–0 Papua New Guinea in Sydney

==== Short track speed skating ====
- World Cup in Montreal, Canada:
  - Men:
    - 500 m: (gold) Charles Hamelin (CAN) (silver) Simon Cho (USA) (bronze) Liang Wenhao (CHN)
    - 1500 m: (gold) Guillaume Bastille (CAN) (silver) Travis Jayner (USA) (bronze) Maxime Chataignier (FRA)
      - Standings (after 2 events): Bastille 1640 points, Jeff Simon (USA) 1000, Jayner, Simon Cho (USA) 800.
    - 5000 m relay: (gold) Canada (silver) France (bronze) United States
  - Women:
    - 500 m: (gold) Marianne St-Gelais (CAN) (silver) Arianna Fontana (ITA) (bronze) Valerie Lambert (CAN)
    - 1500 m: (gold) Katherine Reutter (USA) (silver) Marie-Ève Drolet (CAN) (bronze) Zhou Yang (CHN)
      - Standings (after 2 events): Zhou 1440 points, Reutter, Lana Gehring (USA) 1000.
    - 3000 m relay: (gold) China (silver) United States (bronze) Canada

==== Snooker ====
- Euro Players Tour Championship:
  - Event 3 in Rüsselsheim, Germany:
    - Final: **Marcus Campbell** (SCO) 4–0 Liang Wenbo (CHN)
      - Campbell wins his first professional title.
      - Order of Merit (after 9 of 12 events): (1) Mark Selby (ENG) 18,400 (2) Barry Pinches (ENG) 17,500 (3) Mark Williams (WAL) 16,600

==== Tennis ====
- ATP World Tour:
  - If Stockholm Open:
    - Final: **Roger Federer** (SUI) def. Florian Mayer (GER) 6–4, 6–3
      - Federer wins his third title of the year and the 64th of his career.
  - Kremlin Cup:
    - Final: **Viktor Troicki** (SRB) def. Marcos Baghdatis (CYP) 3–6, 6–4, 6–3
      - Troicki wins the first title of his career.
- WTA Tour:
  - Kremlin Cup:
    - Final: **Victoria Azarenka** (BLR) def. Maria Kirilenko (RUS) 6–3, 6–4
      - Azarenka wins her second title of the year and the fifth of her career.
  - BGL Luxembourg Open:
    - Final: **Roberta Vinci** (ITA) def. Julia Görges (GER) 6–3, 6–4
      - Vinci wins the third title of her career.

=== October 23, 2010 (Saturday) ===
==== Alpine skiing ====
- Women's World Cup:
  - Giant slalom in Sölden, Austria: (gold) Viktoria Rebensburg (GER) 2:26.39 (silver) Kathrin Hölzl (GER) 2:26.81 (bronze) Manuela Mölgg (ITA) 2:27.25

==== American football ====
- NCAA (unbeaten teams in **bold**):
  - BCS Top 10:
    - (11) **Missouri** 36, (1) Oklahoma 27
    - (4) **Auburn** 24, (6) LSU 17
    - (5) **TCU** 38, Air Force 7
    - (7) **Michigan State** 35, Northwestern 27
    - "Third Saturday in October": (8) Alabama 41, Tennessee 10
    - (9) **Utah** 59, Colorado State 6
    - (10) Ohio State 49, Purdue 0
  - Played earlier this week: (2) **Oregon**
  - Idle: (3) **Boise State**
  - Other games:
    - (13) Wisconsin 31, (15) Iowa 30
    - (16) Nebraska 51, (14) Oklahoma State 41
    - Iowa State 28, (19) Texas 21
    - Syracuse 19, (20) West Virginia 14

==== Auto racing ====
- Nationwide Series:
  - 5-Hour Energy 250 in Madison, Illinois: (1) (Michigan) Brad Keselowski (Dodge; Penske Racing) (2) (Oregon) Mike Bliss (Chevrolet; Kevin Harvick Inc.) (3) Justin Allgaier (Dodge; Penske Racing)
    - Drivers' championship standings (after 32 of 35 races): (1) Keselowski 5144 points (2) (Missouri) Carl Edwards (Ford; Roush Fenway Racing) 4659 (3) (Nevada) Kyle Busch (Toyota; Joe Gibbs Racing) 4439
- V8 Supercars:
  - Armor All Gold Coast 600 in Surfers Paradise, Queensland: (1) Garth Tander (AUS)/Cameron McConville (AUS) (Holden Commodore) (2) Craig Lowndes (AUS)/Andy Priaulx (UK) (Holden Commodore) (3) Shane van Gisbergen (NZL)/John McIntyre (NZL) (Ford Falcon)
    - Drivers' championship standings (after 19 of 26 races): (1) James Courtney (AUS) (Ford Falcon) 2401 points (2) Jamie Whincup (AUS) (Holden Commodore) 2300 (3) Lowndes 2177

==== Baseball ====
- Major League Baseball postseason:
  - National League Championship Series:
    - Game 6, San Francisco Giants 3, Philadelphia Phillies 2. **Giants win series 4–2.**
      - The Giants win their first pennant since 2002. Cody Ross of the Giants is named series MVP.
- Nippon Professional Baseball Climax Series:
  - Central League Final Stage:
    - Game 4, Chunichi Dragons 4, Yomiuri Giants 3. **Dragons win series 4–1.**

==== Figure skating ====
- ISU Grand Prix:
  - NHK Trophy in Nagoya, Japan:
    - Men's Short Program: (1) Daisuke Takahashi (JPN) 78.04 (2) Jeremy Abbott (USA) 74.62 (3) Shawn Sawyer (CAN) 70.15
    - Ice Dance: (gold) Meryl Davis / Charlie White (USA) 165.21 (silver) Kaitlyn Weaver / Andrew Poje (CAN) 141.57 (bronze) Maia Shibutani / Alex Shibutani (USA) 136.93
    - Pairs: (gold) Pang Qing / Tong Jian (CHN) 189.37 (silver) Vera Bazarova / Yuri Larionov (RUS) 173.83 (bronze) Narumi Takahashi / Mervin Tran (JPN) 155.66
    - Ladies: (gold) Carolina Kostner (ITA) 164.61 (silver) Rachael Flatt (USA) 161.04 (bronze) Kanako Murakami (JPN) 150.16

==== Football (soccer) ====
- 2011 FIFA Women's World Cup qualification (UEFA):
  - Repechage II, first leg:
    - Italy 1–0 Switzerland
- OFC Champions League Group stage, matchday 1:
  - Group A:
    - Koloale (Solomon Islands) 1–2 (Fiji) Lautoka
    - PRK Hekari United (Papua New Guinea) 1–2 (Vanuatu) Amical
  - Group B: Auckland City FC (New Zealand) 3–0 (New Caledonia) AS Magenta

==== Futsal ====
- Grand Prix de Futsal in Anápolis, Brazil:
  - 15th place match: **Zambia** 6–3 Qatar
  - 13th place match: **Netherlands** 3–1 Romania
  - 11th place match: Costa Rica 1–3 **Guatemala**
  - 9th place match: Libya 0–2 **Russia**
  - 7th place match: Czech Republic 1–2 **Argentina**
  - 5th place match: Portugal 0–3 **Italy**
  - 3rd place match: Iran 3–5 (a.e.t.) (bronze) **Paraguay**

==== Gymnastics ====
- World Artistic Gymnastics Championships in Rotterdam, Netherlands:
  - Men's:
    - Floor: (gold) Eleftherios Kosmidis (GRE) 15.700 points (silver) Kōhei Uchimura (JPN) 15.533 (bronze) Daniel Purvis (GBR) 15.366
    - Pommel horse: (gold) Krisztián Berki (HUN) 15.833 points (silver) Louis Smith (GBR) 15.733 (bronze) Prashanth Sellathurai (AUS) 15.566
    - Rings: (gold) Chen Yibing (CHN) 15.900 points (silver) Yan Mingyong (CHN) 15.700 (bronze) Matteo Morandi (ITA) 15.666
  - Women's:
    - Vault: (gold) Alicia Sacramone (USA) 15.200 points (silver) Aliya Mustafina (RUS) 15.066 (bronze) Jade Barbosa (BRA) 14.799
    - Uneven bars: (gold) Beth Tweddle (GBR) 15.733 points (silver) Aliya Mustafina (RUS) 15.600 (bronze) Rebecca Bross (USA) 15.066

==== Horse racing ====
- Cox Plate in Melbourne: (gold) So You Think (trainer: Bart Cummings; jockey: Steven Arnold) (silver) Zipping (trainer: Robert Hickmott; jockey: Nicholas Hall) (bronze) Whobegotyou (trainer: Mark Kavanagh; jockey: Michael Rodd)
  - So You Think becomes the first horse since Northerly (2001–02) to win two successive Cox Plates.

==== Korfball ====
- European Championship first round in the Netherlands, matchday 2:
  - Group A in Leeuwarden:
    - Germany 36–13 Serbia
    - Netherlands 41–8 Hungary
      - Standings (after 2 games): Netherlands 6 points, Hungary, Germany 3, Serbia 0.
  - Group B in Tilburg:
    - Poland 16–11 Scotland
    - Belgium 29–12 Catalonia
      - Standings (after 2 games): Belgium 6 points, Catalonia, Poland 3, Scotland 0.
  - Group C in Almelo:
    - Portugal 30–9 Wales
    - Czech Republic 33–9 Turkey
      - Standings (after 2 games): Czech Republic, Portugal 6 points, Turkey, Wales 0.
  - Group D in The Hague:
    - England 27–6 Slovakia
    - Russia 16–12 Ireland
      - Standings (after 2 games): England, Russia 6 points, Ireland, Slovakia 0.

==== Mixed martial arts ====
- UFC 121 in Anaheim, California
  - Heavyweight bout: Brendan Schaub (USA) def. Gabriel Gonzaga (BRA) by unanimous decision (30–27, 30–27, 30–27)
  - Light heavyweight bout: Matt Hamill (USA) def. Tito Ortiz (USA) by unanimous decision (29–28, 29–28, 30–27)
  - Welterweight bout: Diego Sanchez (USA) def. Paulo Thiago (BRA) by unanimous decision (30–26, 29–28, 29–28)
  - Welterweight bout: Jake Shields (USA) def. Martin Kampmann (DNK) by split decision (29–28 Shields, 29–28 Kampmann, 29–28 Shields)
  - Heavyweight Championship bout: **Cain Velasquez** (USA) def. Brock Lesnar (c) (USA) by TKO (punches)

==== Rugby league ====
- Four Nations:
  - Round 1: New Zealand 24–10 England in Wellington
- European Cup:
  - France 11–12 Wales
    - Standings: Wales 6 points (3 matches), France 4 (3), Ireland, Scotland 0 (2).
    - Wales win the title and qualify for 2011 Four Nations.

==== Rugby union ====
- End of year tests:
  - Week 1: Russia 20–40 Argentina XV in Moscow

==== Short track speed skating ====
- World Cup in Montreal, Canada:
  - Men:
    - 1000 m: (gold) Thibaut Fauconnet (FRA) (silver) Michael Gilday (CAN) (bronze) Travis Jayner (USA)
    - 1500 m: (gold) Jeff Simon (USA) (silver) Simon Cho (USA) (bronze) Guillaume Bastille (CAN)
  - Women:
    - 1000 m: (gold) Katherine Reutter (USA) (silver) Marianne St-Gelais (CAN) (bronze) Liu Qiuhong (CHN)
    - 1500 m: (gold) Lana Gehring (USA) (silver) Zhou Yang (CHN) (bronze) Valérie Maltais (CAN)

=== October 22, 2010 (Friday) ===
==== Baseball ====
- Major League Baseball postseason:
  - American League Championship Series:
    - Game 6, Texas Rangers 6, New York Yankees 1. **Rangers win series 4–2.**
      - The Rangers win their first pennant ever. The Rangers' Josh Hamilton is named series MVP.
- Nippon Professional Baseball Climax Series:
  - Central League Final Stage:
    - Game 3, Yomiuri Giants 3, Chunichi Dragons 2. Dragons lead series 3–1.

==== Cricket ====
- Zimbabwe in South Africa:
  - 3rd ODI in Benoni: South Africa 399/6 (50 overs; JP Duminy 129, AB de Villiers 109); Zimbabwe 127 (29 overs). **South Africa win by 272 runs; win 3-match series 3–0.**

==== Figure skating ====
- ISU Grand Prix:
  - NHK Trophy in Nagoya, Japan:
    - Short Dance: (1) Meryl Davis / Charlie White (USA) 66.97 (2) Kaitlyn Weaver / Andrew Poje (CAN) 58.69 (3) Elena Ilinykh / Nikita Katsalapov (RUS) 56.89
    - Pairs Short Program: (1) Pang Qing / Tong Jian (CHN) 67.10 (2) Vera Bazarova / Yuri Larionov (RUS) 60.16 (3) Narumi Takahashi / Mervin Tran (JPN) 57.23
    - Ladies' Short Program: (1) Carolina Kostner (ITA) 57.27 (2) Kanako Murakami (JPN) 56.10 (3) Rachael Flatt (USA) 53.69

==== Football (soccer) ====
- Caribbean Championship Qualifying Group Stage Two:
  - Group E in St. George's, Grenada:
    - Saint Kitts and Nevis 1–2 Guadeloupe
    - Grenada 3–1 Puerto Rico

==== Futsal ====
- Grand Prix de Futsal in Anápolis, Brazil:
  - 13th–16th playoffs:
    - Zambia 2–8 **Netherlands**
    - **Romania** 4–1 Qatar
  - 9th–12th playoffs:
    - **Libya** 5–2 Costa Rica
    - Guatemala 4–7 **Russia**
  - 5th–8th playoffs:
    - Argentina 1–2 **Portugal**
    - Czech Republic 2–4 **Italy**
  - Semifinals:
    - Iran 4–6 **Spain**
    - Paraguay 3–5 **Brazil**

==== Gymnastics ====
- World Artistic Gymnastics Championships in Rotterdam, Netherlands:
  - Men's Individual all-around: (gold) Kōhei Uchimura (JPN) 92.331 points (silver) Philipp Boy (GER) 90.048 (bronze) Jonathan Horton (USA) 89.864
    - Uchimura wins the all-around title for the second straight time.
  - Women's Individual all-around: (gold) Aliya Mustafina (RUS) 61.032 points (silver) Jiang Yuyuan (CHN) 59.998 (bronze) Rebecca Bross (USA) 58.996
    - Mustafina wins her first individual world title.

==== Korfball ====
- European Championship first round in the Netherlands, matchday 1:
  - Group A in Leeuwarden:
    - Hungary 22–16 Serbia
    - Netherlands 36–8 Germany
  - Group B in Tilburg:
    - Catalonia 35–7 Scotland
    - Belgium 38–10 Poland
  - Group C in Almelo:
    - Portugal 20–9 Turkey
    - Czech Republic 32–7 Wales
  - Group D in The Hague:
    - England 24–6 Ireland
    - Russia 23–14 Slovakia

==== Snooker ====
- Players Tour Championship:
  - Euro Event 3:
    - Thanawat Thirapongpaiboon becomes the youngest player ever to make an official maximum break at the age of 16 years and 312 days.

=== October 21, 2010 (Thursday) ===
==== American football ====
- NCAA BCS Top 10 (unbeaten team in **bold**):
  - (2) **Oregon** 60, UCLA 13

==== Baseball ====
- Major League Baseball postseason:
  - National League Championship Series:
    - Game 5, Philadelphia Phillies 4, San Francisco Giants 2. Giants lead series 3–2.
- Nippon Professional Baseball Climax Series:
  - Central League Final Stage:
    - Game 2, Chunichi Dragons 2, Yomiuri Giants 0. Dragons lead series 3–0.

==== Basketball ====
- Euroleague:
  - Regular Season, matchday 1:
    - Group A:
      - Žalgiris Kaunas (Lithuania) 73–62 (Serbia) Partizan Belgrade
      - Caja Laboral (Spain) 94–78 (Israel) Maccabi Tel Aviv
    - Group B: Unicaja Málaga (Spain) 84–73 (Belgium) Spirou Basket
    - Group C:
      - Regal FC Barcelona (Spain) 80–66 (Croatia) KK Cibona Zagreb
      - Montepaschi Siena (Italy) 76–44 (France) Cholet Basket
    - Group D:
      - CSKA Moscow (Russia) 73–88 (Italy) Armani Jeans Milano
      - Power Electronics Valencia (Spain) 56–72 (Greece) Panathinaikos Athens

==== Football (soccer) ====
- UEFA Europa League group stage, matchday 3:
  - Group A:
    - Manchester City (England) 3–1 (Poland) Lech Poznań
    - Red Bull Salzburg (Austria) 1–1 (Italy) Juventus
      - Standings (after 3 matches): Manchester City 7 points, Lech Poznań 4, Juventus 3, Red Bull Salzburg 1.
  - Group B:
    - Atlético Madrid (Spain) 3–0 (Norway) Rosenborg
    - Aris (Greece) 0–0 (Germany) Bayer Leverkusen
      - Standings (after 3 matches): Bayer Leverkusen 5 points, Aris, Atlético Madrid 4, Rosenborg 3.
  - Group C:
    - Sporting CP (Portugal) 5–1 (Belgium) Gent
    - Lille (France) 1–0 (Bulgaria) Levski Sofia
      - Standings (after 3 matches): Sporting CP 9 points, Lille 4, Levski Sofia 3, Gent 1.
  - Group D:
    - Villarreal (Spain) 1–0 (Greece) PAOK
    - Dinamo Zagreb (Croatia) 0–0 (Belgium) Club Brugge
      - Standings (after 3 matches): Villarreal 6 points, PAOK, Dinamo Zagreb 4, Club Brugge 2.
  - Group E:
    - Sheriff Tiraspol (Moldova) 0–1 (Belarus) BATE
    - AZ (Netherlands) 1–2 (Ukraine) Dynamo Kyiv
      - Standings (after 3 matches): BATE 7 points, Dynamo Kyiv 4, AZ, Sheriff Tiraspol 3.
  - Group F:
    - Palermo (Italy) 0–3 (Russia) CSKA Moscow
    - Sparta Prague (Czech Republic) 3–3 (Switzerland) Lausanne-Sport
      - Standings (after 3 matches): CSKA Moscow 9 points, Sparta Prague 4, Palermo 3, Lausanne-Sport 1.
  - Group G:
    - Zenit St. Petersburg (Russia) 2–0 (Croatia) Hajduk Split
    - Anderlecht (Belgium) 3–0 (Greece) AEK Athens
      - Standings (after 3 matches): Zenit St. Petersburg 9 points, Anderlecht, Hajduk Split, AEK Athens 3.
  - Group H:
    - Young Boys (Switzerland) 4–2 (Denmark) Odense
    - Stuttgart (Germany) 1–0 (Spain) Getafe
      - Standings (after 3 matches): Stuttgart 9 points, Young Boys 6, Getafe 3, Odense 0.
  - Group I:
    - Metalist Kharkiv (Ukraine) 2–1 (Italy) Sampdoria
    - Debrecen (Hungary) 1–2 (Netherlands) PSV Eindhoven
      - Standings (after 3 matches): PSV Eindhoven 7 points, Metalist Kharkiv 6, Sampdoria 4, Debrecen 0.
  - Group J:
    - Borussia Dortmund (Germany) 1–1 (France) Paris Saint-Germain
    - Karpaty Lviv (Ukraine) 0–1 (Spain) Sevilla
      - Standings (after 3 matches): Paris Saint-Germain 7 points, Sevilla 6, Borussia Dortmund 4, Karpaty Lviv 0.
  - Group K:
    - Utrecht (Netherlands) 1–1 (Romania) Steaua București
    - Napoli (Italy) 0–0 (England) Liverpool
      - Standings (after 3 matches): Liverpool 5 points, Napoli, Utrecht 3, Steaua București 2.
  - Group L:
    - CSKA Sofia (Bulgaria) 0–2 (Austria) Rapid Wien
    - Beşiktaş (Turkey) 1–3 (Portugal) Porto
      - Standings (after 3 matches): Porto 9 points, Beşiktaş 6, Rapid Wien 3, CSKA Sofia 0.
- CONCACAF Champions League Group Stage, matchday 6: (teams in **bold** advance to the quarterfinals)
  - Group B: Joe Public (Trinidad and Tobago) 1–4 (United States) **Columbus Crew**
    - Final standings: (Mexico) **Santos Laguna** 13 points, Columbus Crew 12, (Guatemala) Municipal 8, Joe Public 1.
- Copa Sudamericana Round of 16, second leg (first leg score in parentheses):
  - San José (Bolivia) 2–0 (0–6) (Argentina) **Newell's Old Boys**. 3–3 on points; Newell's Old Boys win 6–2 on aggregate.
  - **Avaí** (Brazil) 3–1 (1–2) (Ecuador) Emelec. 3–3 on points; Avaí win 4–3 on aggregate.

==== Futsal ====
- Grand Prix de Futsal in Anápolis, Brazil:
  - 9th–16th playoffs:
    - **Libya** 1–0 Zambia
    - Netherlands 2–4 **Costa Rica**
    - Romania 2–3 **Guatemala**
    - **Russia** 9–2 Qatar
  - Quarterfinals:
    - **Iran** 2–0 (a.e.t.) Argentina
    - **Spain** 3–1 Portugal
    - **Paraguay** 7–2 Czech Republic
    - **Brazil** 6–1 Italy

==== Gymnastics ====
- World Artistic Gymnastics Championships in Rotterdam, Netherlands:
  - Men's Team all-around: (gold) China 274.997 points (silver) Japan 273.769 (bronze) Germany 271.252
    - China win the men's team title for the fourth straight time and ninth overall.

==== Snooker ====
- Premier League Snooker – League phase in Banbury:
  - Neil Robertson (AUS) 6–0 Ding Junhui (CHN)
  - Marco Fu (HKG) 3–3 Mark Williams (WAL)
    - Standings: Williams 5 points (4 matches), Mark Selby (ENG), Fu 4 (4), Ding 4 (5), Robertson, Shaun Murphy (ENG), Ronnie O'Sullivan (ENG) 3 (3).

=== October 20, 2010 (Wednesday) ===
==== Baseball ====
- Major League Baseball postseason:
  - American League Championship Series:
    - Game 5, New York Yankees 7, Texas Rangers 2. Rangers lead series 3–2.
  - National League Championship Series:
    - Game 4, San Francisco Giants 6, Philadelphia Phillies 5. Giants lead series 3–1.
- Nippon Professional Baseball Climax Series:
  - Central League Final Stage:
    - Game 1, Chunichi Dragons 5, Yomiuri Giants 0. Dragons lead series 2–0.

==== Basketball ====
- Euroleague:
  - Regular Season, matchday 1:
    - Group A: Khimki Moscow (Russia) 82–76 (Poland) Asseco Prokom Gdynia
    - Group B: Virtus Roma (Italy) 83–65 (Germany) Brose Baskets
    - Group C: Fenerbahçe Ülker (Turkey) 86–69 (Lithuania) Lietuvos Rytas
    - Group D: Union Olimpija Ljubljana (Slovenia) 95–90 (2OT) (Turkey) Efes Pilsen Istanbul

==== Cricket ====
- Australia in India:
  - 2nd ODI in Visakhapatnam: Australia 289/3 (50 overs; Michael Clarke 111*); India 292/5 (48.5 overs; Virat Kohli 118). **India win by 5 wickets; lead 3-match series 1–0.**

==== Football (soccer) ====
- UEFA Champions League group stage, matchday 3:
  - Group A:
    - Internazionale (Italy) 4–3 (England) Tottenham
    - Twente (Netherlands) 1–1 (Germany) Werder Bremen
      - Standings (after 3 matches): Internazionale 7 points, Tottenham Hotspur 4, Twente, Werder Bremen 2.
  - Group B:
    - Schalke 04 (Germany) 3–1 (Israel) Hapoel Tel Aviv
      - Raúl scores twice to become the leading scorer in European club competitions with 70 goals.
    - Lyon (France) 2–0 (Portugal) Benfica
      - Standings (after 3 matches): Lyon 9 points, Schalke 04 6, Benfica 3, Hapoel Tel Aviv 0.
  - Group C:
    - Rangers (Scotland) 1–1 (Spain) Valencia
    - Manchester United (England) 1–0 (Turkey) Bursaspor
      - Standings (after 3 matches): Manchester United 7 points, Rangers 5, Valencia 4, Bursaspor 0.
  - Group D:
    - Panathinaikos (Greece) 0–0 (Russia) Rubin Kazan
    - Barcelona (Spain) 2–0 (Denmark) Copenhagen
      - Standings (after 3 matches): Barcelona 7 points, Copenhagen 6, Rubin Kazan 2, Panathinaikos 1.
- AFC Champions League Semi-finals, second leg: (first leg score in parentheses):
  - **Seongnam Ilhwa Chunma** (South Korea) 1–0 (3–4) (Saudi Arabia) Al-Shabab. 4–4 on aggregate; Seongnam Ilhwa Chunma win on away goals rule.
  - Al-Hilal (Saudi Arabia) 0–1 (0–1) (Iran) **Zob Ahan**. Zob Ahan win 2–0 on aggregate.
- CONCACAF Champions League Group Stage, matchday 6: (teams in **bold** advance to the quarterfinals)
  - Group C: Marathón (Honduras) 0–1 (Mexico) **Monterrey**
    - Final standings: Monterrey 16 points, (Costa Rica) **Saprissa** 10, Marathón 6, (United States) Seattle Sounders FC 3.
  - Group D:
    - **Toluca** (Mexico) 5–0 (El Salvador) FAS
    - **Olimpia** (Honduras) 3–0 Puerto Rico Islanders
      - Final standings: Olimpia 13 points, Toluca 10, Puerto Rico Islanders 8, FAS 2.
- Copa Sudamericana Round of 16, second leg (first leg score in parentheses):
  - Peñarol (Uruguay) 3–2 (0–1) (Brazil) **Goiás**. 3–3 on points, 3–3 on aggregate; Goiás win on away goals rule.
  - **Palmeiras** (Brazil) 3–1 (1–0) (Bolivia) Universitario. Palmeiras win 6–0 on points.
  - Santa Fe (Colombia) 1–0 (0–2) (Brazil) **Atlético Mineiro**. 3–3 on points; Atlético Mineiro win 2–1 on aggregate.

==== Gymnastics ====
- World Artistic Gymnastics Championships in Rotterdam, Netherlands:
  - Women's Team all-around: (gold) Russia 175.397 points (silver) United States 175.196 (bronze) China 174.781
    - Russia win the women's team title for the first time as a separate team (since the break-up of Soviet Union).

=== October 19, 2010 (Tuesday) ===
==== Baseball ====
- Major League Baseball postseason:
  - American League Championship Series:
    - Game 4, Texas Rangers 10, New York Yankees 3. Rangers lead series 3–1.
  - National League Championship Series:
    - Game 3, San Francisco Giants 3, Philadelphia Phillies 0. Giants lead series 2–1.
- Nippon Professional Baseball Climax Series:
  - Pacific League Final Stage:
    - Game 6, Chiba Lotte Marines 7, Fukuoka SoftBank Hawks 0. **Marines win series 4–3.**

==== Football (soccer) ====
- UEFA Champions League group stage, matchday 3:
  - Group E:
    - Roma (Italy) 1–3 (Switzerland) Basel
    - Bayern Munich (Germany) 3–2 (Romania) CFR Cluj
      - Standings (after 3 matches): Bayern Munich 9 points, Basel, CFR Cluj, Roma 3.
  - Group F:
    - Spartak Moscow (Russia) 0–2 (England) Chelsea
    - Marseille (France) 1–0 (Slovakia) Žilina
      - Standings (after 3 matches): Chelsea 9 points, Spartak Moscow 6, Marseille 3, Žilina 0.
  - Group G:
    - Ajax (Netherlands) 2–1 (France) Auxerre
    - Real Madrid (Spain) 2–0 (Italy) Milan
      - Standings (after 3 matches): Real Madrid 9 points, Milan, Ajax 4, Auxerre 0.
  - Group H:
    - Braga (Portugal) 2–0 (Serbia) Partizan
    - Arsenal (England) 5–1 (Ukraine) Shakhtar Donetsk
      - Standings (after 3 matches): Arsenal 9 points, Shakhtar Donetsk 6, Braga 3, Partizan 0.
- AFC Cup Semi-finals, second leg (first leg score in parentheses):
  - **Al-Qadsia** (Kuwait) 4–1 (0–2) (Bahrain) Al-Riffa. Al-Qadsia win 4–3 on aggregate.
  - **Al-Ittihad** (Syria) 2–0 (0–1) (Thailand) Muangthong United. Al-Ittihad win 2–1 on aggregate.
- CONCACAF Champions League Group Stage, matchday 6: (teams in **bold** advance to the quarterfinals)
  - Group A:
    - Toronto FC (Canada) 1–0 (Panama) Árabe Unido
    - **Real Salt Lake** (United States) 3–1 (Mexico) **Cruz Azul**
      - Final standings: Real Salt Lake 13 points, Cruz Azul 10, Toronto FC 8, Árabe Unido 3.
  - Group B: **Santos Laguna** (Mexico) 6–1 (Guatemala) Municipal
    - Standings: Santos Laguna 13 points (6 matches), (United States) **Columbus Crew** 9 (5), Municipal 8 (6), (Trinidad and Tobago) Joe Public 1 (5).
  - Group C: Seattle Sounders FC (United States) 1–2 (Costa Rica) **Saprissa**
    - Standings: (Mexico) **Monterrey** 13 points (5 matches), Saprissa 10 (6), (Honduras) Marathón 6 (5), Seattle Sounders FC 3 (6).
- Copa Sudamericana Round of 16, second leg (first leg score in parentheses):
  - **Independiente** (Argentina) 4–2 (0–1) (Uruguay) Defensor Sporting. 3–3 on points; Independiente win 4–3 on aggregate.
  - **LDU Quito** (Ecuador) 6–1 (2–4) (Chile) Unión San Felipe. 3–3 on points; LDU Quito win 8–5 on aggregate.

==== Futsal ====
- Grand Prix de Futsal in Anápolis, Brazil: (teams in **bold** advance to the quarterfinals)
  - Group A:
    - **Brazil** 2–1 Libya
    - **Czech Republic** 7–2 Costa Rica
      - Final standings: Brazil 9 points, Czech Republic 4, Libya 2, Costa Rica 1.
  - Group B:
    - **Spain** 7–1 Romania
    - Qatar 1–5 **Argentina**
      - Final standings: Spain 9 points, Argentina, Romania 4, Qatar 0.
  - Group C:
    - **Italy** 1–2 **Paraguay**
    - Zambia 1–7 Netherlands
    - Final standings: Paraguay 9 points, Italy 6, Netherlands 3, Zambia 0.
  - Group D:
    - Russia 7–0 Guatemala
    - **Iran** 5–3 **Portugal**
      - Final standings: Iran 7 points, Portugal 6, Russia 4, Guatemala 0.

=== October 18, 2010 (Monday) ===
==== American football ====
- NFL, Week 6:
  - Monday Night Football: Tennessee Titans 30, Jacksonville Jaguars 3

==== Baseball ====
- Major League Baseball postseason:
  - American League Championship Series:
    - Game 3, Texas Rangers 8, New York Yankees 0. Rangers lead series 2–1.
- Nippon Professional Baseball Climax Series:
  - Pacific League Final Stage:
    - Game 5, Chiba Lotte Marines 5, Fukuoka SoftBank Hawks 2. Series tied 3–3.

==== Basketball ====
- Euroleague:
  - Regular Season, matchday 1:
    - Group B: Olympiacos Piraeus (Greece) 82–66 (Spain) Real Madrid

==== Futsal ====
- Grand Prix de Futsal in Anápolis, Brazil: (teams in **bold** advance to the quarterfinals)
  - Group A:
    - Libya 2–2 Czech Republic
    - Costa Rica 0–8 **Brazil**
      - Standings (after 2 matches): Brazil 6 points, Libya 2, Czech Republic, Costa Rica 1.
  - Group B:
    - Argentina 2–4 **Spain**
    - Romania 4–1 Qatar
      - Standings (after 2 matches): Spain 6 points, Romania 4, Argentina 1, Qatar 0.
  - Group C:
    - Netherlands 1–3 **Italy**
    - **Paraguay** 6–0 Zambia
      - Standings (after 2 matches): Paraguay, Italy 6 points, Netherlands, Zambia 0.
  - Group D:
    - **Portugal** 2–1 Russia
    - Guatemala 1–6 Iran
      - Standings (after 2 matches): Portugal 6 points, Iran 4, Russia 1, Guatemala 0.

=== October 17, 2010 (Sunday) ===
==== American football ====
- NFL, Week 6:
  - New York Giants 28, Detroit Lions 20
  - Philadelphia Eagles 31, Atlanta Falcons 17
  - Pittsburgh Steelers 28, Cleveland Browns 10
  - Houston Texans 35, Kansas City Chiefs 31
  - New Orleans Saints 31, Tampa Bay Buccaneers 6
  - Miami Dolphins 23, Green Bay Packers 20 (OT)
  - St. Louis Rams 20, San Diego Chargers 17
  - New England Patriots 23, Baltimore Ravens 20 (OT)
  - Seattle Seahawks 23, Chicago Bears 20
  - New York Jets 24, Denver Broncos 20
  - San Francisco 49ers 17, Oakland Raiders 9
  - Minnesota Vikings 24, Dallas Cowboys 21
  - Sunday Night Football: Indianapolis Colts 27, Washington Redskins 24
  - Byes: Arizona Cardinals, Buffalo Bills, Carolina Panthers, Cincinnati Bengals
- NCAA:
  - The first BCS standings of the season are released, with Oklahoma as #1.
  - Oregon is the new #1 in the AP Poll for the first time ever. The last team to be #1 for the first time in the AP Poll was Virginia in 1990.

==== Baseball ====
- Major League Baseball postseason:
  - National League Championship Series:
    - Game 2, Philadelphia Phillies 6, San Francisco Giants 1. Series tied 1–1.
- Nippon Professional Baseball Climax Series:
  - Pacific League Final Stage:
    - Game 4, Chiba Lotte Marines 4, Fukuoka SoftBank Hawks 2. Hawks lead series 3–2.
  - Central League First Stage:
    - Game 2, Yomiuri Giants 7, Hanshin Tigers 6. **Giants win series 2–0.**

==== Cricket ====
- Australia in India:
  - 1st ODI in Kochi: India vs. Australia. **Match abandoned without a ball bowled.**
- New Zealand in Bangladesh:
  - 5th ODI in Mirpur: Bangladesh 174 (44.2 overs); New Zealand 171 (49.3 overs). **Bangladesh win by 3 runs; win 5-match series 4–0.**
- Zimbabwe in South Africa:
  - 2nd ODI in Potchefstroom: Zimbabwe 268 (48.2 overs; Rusty Theron 5/44); South Africa 273/2 (39 overs; Hashim Amla 110, AB de Villiers 101*). **South Africa win by 8 wickets; lead 3-match series 2–0.**

==== Equestrianism ====
- Show jumping:
  - FEI World Cup Western European League:
    - 1st competition in Oslo (CSI 5*-W): (gold) Christian Ahlmann (GER) on Taloubet Z (silver) Ludger Beerbaum (GER) on Chaman (bronze) Lars Nieberg (GER) on Levito

==== Football (soccer) ====
- Caribbean Championship Qualifying Group Stage One: (teams in **bold** advance to Qualifying Group Stage Two)
  - Group C in Paramaribo, Suriname:
    - Saint Lucia 2–2 Netherlands Antilles
    - **Suriname** 0–2 **Guyana**
      - Final standings: Guyana 9 points, Suriname 6 points, Saint Lucia, Netherlands Antilles 1.
  - Group D in San Cristóbal, Dominican Republic: Dominican Republic 0–1 **Dominica**
    - Final standings: Dominica 6 points, Dominican Republic 3, British Virgin Islands 0.
- CAF Champions League semifinals, second leg: (first leg score in parentheses)
  - **Espérance ST** (Tunisia) 1–0 (1–2) (Egypt) Al-Ahly. 2–2 on aggregate; Espérance ST win on away goals rule.
- CAF Confederation Cup group stage, matchday 6 (teams in **bold** advance to the semifinals):
  - Group B:
    - **FUS Rabat** (Morocco) 2–1 (Tunisia) **CS Sfaxien**
    - Haras El Hodood (Egypt) 1–1 (Zambia) Zanaco
      - Final standings: FUS Rabat 13 points, CS Sfaxien 10, Zanaco 6, Haras El Hodood 3.
- Copa Libertadores de Fútbol Femenino in Barueri, São Paulo, Brazil:
  - 3rd place playoff: Deportivo Quito (Ecuador) 1–2 (bronze) (Argentina) **Boca Juniors**
  - Final: (silver) Everton (Chile) 0–1 (gold) (Brazil) **Santos**
    - Santos win the title for the second straight time.

==== Futsal ====
- Grand Prix de Futsal in Anápolis, Brazil:
  - Group A:
    - Brazil 9–2 Czech Republic
    - Costa Rica 3–3 Libya
  - Group B:
    - Spain 13–0 Qatar
    - Argentina 2–2 Romania
  - Group C:
    - Italy 2–0 Zambia
    - Netherlands 1–5 Paraguay
  - Group D:
    - Russia 2–2 Iran
    - Portugal 2–0 Guatemala

==== Golf ====
- PGA Tour Fall Series:
  - Frys.com Open in San Martin, California:
    - Winner: Rocco Mediate (USA) 269 (−15)
      - Mediate wins his sixth PGA Tour title, and first in eight years.
- European Tour:
  - Portugal Masters in Vilamoura, Portugal:
    - Winner: Richard Green (AUS) 270 (−18)
      - Green wins his third European Tour title.
- LPGA Tour:
  - CVS/pharmacy LPGA Challenge in Danville, California:
    - Winner: Beatriz Recari (ESP) 274 (−14)
      - Recari wins her first LPGA Tour title.

==== Motorcycle racing ====
- Moto GP:
  - Australian Grand Prix in Phillip Island:
    - MotoGP: (1) Casey Stoner (AUS) (Ducati) (2) Jorge Lorenzo (ESP) (Yamaha) (3) Valentino Rossi (ITA) (Yamaha)
      - Riders' championship standings (after 16 of 18 rounds): (1) Lorenzo 333 points (2) Dani Pedrosa (ESP) (Honda) 228 (3) Stoner 205
      - Manufacturers' championship standings: (1) Yamaha 354 points (2) Honda 315 (3) Ducati 255
    - Moto2: (1) Alex de Angelis (SMR) (Motobi) (2) Scott Redding (GBR) (Suter) (3) Andrea Iannone (ITA) (Speed Up)
      - Riders' championship standings (after 15 of 17 rounds): (1) Toni Elías (ESP) (Moriwaki) 271 points (2) Julián Simón (ESP) (Suter) 181 (3) Iannone 179
      - Manufacturers' championship standings: (1) Moriwaki 296 points (2) Suter 281 (3) Speed Up 204
    - 125cc: (1) Marc Márquez (ESP) (Derbi) (2) Pol Espargaró (ESP) (Derbi) (3) Nicolás Terol (ESP) (Aprilia)
      - Riders' championship standings (after 15 of 17 rounds): (1) Márquez 272 points (2) Terol 260 (3) Espargaró 255
      - Manufacturers' championship standings: (1) Derbi 360 points (2) Aprilia 303 (3) Honda 23

==== Rugby union ====
- Heineken Cup pool stage, matchday 2:
  - Pool 4: Biarritz (France) 35–15 (Ireland) Ulster
    - Standings (after 2 matches): Biarritz 9 points, (England) Bath 6, Ulster 5, (Italy) Aironi 0.
  - Pool 5:
    - Perpignan (France) 35–14 (Italy) Benetton Treviso
    - Leicester Tigers (England) 46–10 (Wales) Scarlets
      - Standings (after 2 matches): Leicester Tigers 10 points, Perpignan 6, Scarlets 5, Benetton Treviso 1.
  - Pool 6: London Wasps (England) 38–26 (Scotland) Glasgow Warriors
    - Standings (after 2 matches): (France) Toulouse 8 points, London Wasps 6, Glasgow Warriors 4, (Wales) Newport Gwent Dragons 0.
- Amlin Challenge Cup pool stage, matchday 2:
  - Pool 4: Leeds Carnegie (England) 13–22 (France) Stade Français
    - Standings (after 2 matches): Stade Français 9 points, Leeds Carnegie, (Romania) București Oaks 4, (Italy) Overmach Parma 1.

==== Snooker ====
- Players Tour Championship:
  - Event 6 in Sheffield:
    - Final: **Dominic Dale** (WAL) 4–3 Martin Gould (ENG)
      - Dale wins the third professional title of his career.
      - Order of Merit (after 8 of 12 events): (1) Barry Pinches (ENG) 17,300 (2) Mark Selby (ENG) 17,000 (3) Mark Williams (WAL) 16,400

==== Tennis ====
- ATP World Tour:
  - Shanghai Rolex Masters:
    - Final: **Andy Murray** (GBR) def. Roger Federer (SUI) 6–3, 6–2
      - Murray wins his second title of the year – both against Federer – and the 16th of his career.
- WTA Tour:
  - Generali Ladies Linz:
    - Final: **Ana Ivanovic** (SRB) def. Patty Schnyder (SUI) 6–1, 6–2
      - Ivanovic wins the ninth title of her career.
  - HP Open:
    - Final: **Tamarine Tanasugarn** (THA) def. Kimiko Date-Krumm (JPN) 7–5, 6–7(4), 6–1
      - Tanasugarn wins the fourth title of her career.

=== October 16, 2010 (Saturday) ===
==== American football ====
- NCAA: (unbeaten teams in **bold**)
  - AP Top 10:
    - (18) Wisconsin 31, (1) Ohio State 18
    - (3) **Boise State** 48, San Jose State 0
    - (4) **TCU** 31, Brigham Young 3
    - Texas 20, (5) Nebraska 13
    - (6) **Oklahoma** 52, Iowa State 0
    - (7) **Auburn** 65, (12) Arkansas 43
    - (8) Alabama 23, Mississippi 10
    - (9) **LSU** 32, McNeese State 10
    - Kentucky 31, (10) South Carolina 28
      - The Wildcats defeat a Steve Spurrier-coached team for the first time in 18 tries.
  - Idle: (2) **Oregon**
  - Other games:
    - Hawaiʻi 27, (19) Nevada 21
    - Mississippi State 10, (22) Florida 7
    - San Diego State 27, (23) Air Force 25
    - Washington 35, (24) Oregon State 34 (2OT)
  - Other unbeaten teams: (11) **Utah**, (13) **Michigan State**, (20) **Oklahoma State**, (21) **Missouri**

==== Athletics ====
- World Half Marathon Championships in Nanning, China:
  - Men: (gold) Wilson Kiprop (KEN) 1:00:07 (silver) Zersenay Tadese (ERI) 1:00:11 (bronze) Sammy Kitwara (KEN) 1:00:22
  - Women: (gold) Florence Kiplagat (KEN) 1:08:24 (silver) Dire Tune (ETH) 1:08:34 (bronze) Peninah Arusei (KEN) 1:09:05
  - Men's team: (gold) Kenya 3:01:32 (silver) Eritrea 3:03:04 (bronze) Ethiopia 3:05:26
  - Women's team: (gold) Kenya 3:26:59 (silver) Ethiopia 3:27:33 (bronze) Japan 3:33:40

==== Auto racing ====
- Chase for the Sprint Cup:
  - Bank of America 500 in Concord, North Carolina: (1) (Missouri) Jamie McMurray (Chevrolet; Earnhardt Ganassi Racing) (2) (Nevada) Kyle Busch (Toyota; Joe Gibbs Racing) (3) (California) Jimmie Johnson (Chevrolet; Hendrick Motorsports)
    - Drivers' championship standings (after 31 of 36 races): (1) Johnson 5843 points (2) (Virginia) Denny Hamlin (Toyota; Joe Gibbs Racing) 5802 (3) (California) Kevin Harvick (Chevrolet; Richard Childress Racing) 5766

==== Baseball ====
- Major League Baseball postseason:
  - American League Championship Series:
    - Game 2, Texas Rangers 7, New York Yankees 2. Series tied 1–1.
  - National League Championship Series:
    - Game 1, San Francisco Giants 4, Philadelphia Phillies 3. Giants lead series 1–0.
- Nippon Professional Baseball Climax Series:
  - Pacific League Final Stage:
    - Game 3, Fukuoka SoftBank Hawks 1, Chiba Lotte Marines 0. Hawks lead series 3–1.
  - Central League First Stage:
    - Game 1, Yomiuri Giants 3, Hanshin Tigers 1. Giants lead best-of-3 series 1–0.

==== Cycling ====
- Monument Classics:
  - Giro di Lombardia: (1) Philippe Gilbert (BEL) (Omega Pharma–Lotto) 6h 46' 33" (2) Michele Scarponi (ITA) (Androni Giocattoli) + 12" (3) Pablo Lastras (ESP) (Caisse d'Epargne) + 55"
    - Final UCI World Rankings: (gold) Joaquim Rodríguez (ESP) (Team Katusha) 551 points (silver) Alberto Contador (ESP) (Astana) 482 (bronze) Gilbert 437

==== Figure skating ====
- ISU Junior Grand Prix in Ostrava, Czech Republic: (skaters in **bold** qualify for ISU Junior Grand Prix Final)
  - Ice dance: (gold) **Ekaterina Pushkash / Jonathan Guerreiro** (RUS) 136.80 (silver) Tiffany Zahorski / Alexis Miart (FRA) 127.82 (bronze) **Anastasia Galyeta / Alexei Shumski** (UKR) 124.14
    - Final standings: **Ksenia Monko / Kirill Khaliavin** (RUS), **Alexandra Stepanova / Ivan Bukin** (RUS) 30 points, Pushkash / Guerreiro 28, **Charlotte Lichtman / Dean Copely** (USA), **Evgenia Kosigina / Nikolai Moroshkin** (RUS), **Victoria Sinitsina / Ruslan Zhiganshin** (RUS) 26, Galyeta / Shumski 24, **Marina Antipova / Artem Kudashev** (RUS), Zahorski / Miart, Anastasia Cannuscio / Colin McManus (USA) 22 (2).
  - Men: (gold) **Yan Han** (CHN) 193.62 (silver) Artur Dmitriev Jr (RUS) 185.73 (bronze) Alexander Majorov (SWE) 180.73
    - Final standings: **Andrei Rogozine** (CAN), Yan 30 points, **Richard Dornbush** (USA), **Joshua Farris** (USA) 28, **Keegan Messing** (USA), **Max Aaron** (USA), **Zhan Bush** (RUS) 24, **Gordei Gorshkov** (RUS), Dmitriev 22.

==== Football (soccer) ====
- CAF Champions League semifinals, second leg: (first leg score in parentheses)
  - JS Kabylie (Algeria) 0–0 (1–3) (Democratic Republic of the Congo) **TP Mazembe**. TP Mazembe win 3–1 on aggregate.
- CAF Confederation Cup group stage, matchday 6: (teams in **bold** advance to the semifinals)
  - Group A:
    - ASFAN (Niger) 0–0 (Sudan) **Al-Hilal**
    - **Ittihad** (Libya) 2–0 (Mali) Djoliba
      - Final standings: Al-Hilal 13 points, Ittihad 12, Djoliba 7, ASFAN 2.

==== Mixed martial arts ====
- UFC 120 in London:
  - Welterweight bout: Claude Patrick (CAN) def. James Wilks (ENG) by unanimous decision (30–27, 30–27, 30–27)
  - Heavyweight bout: Cheick Kongo (FRA) and Travis Browne (USA) draw (28–28, 28–28, 28–28)
  - Welterweight bout: Mike Pyle (USA) def. John Hathaway (ENG) by unanimous decision (30–27, 30–27, 30–27)
  - Welterweight bout: Carlos Condit (USA) def. Dan Hardy (ENG) by knockout (punch)
  - Middleweight bout: Michael Bisping (ENG) def. Yoshihiro Akiyama (JPN) by unanimous decision (30–27, 30–27, 30–27)

==== Rugby union ====
- Heineken Cup pool stage, matchday 2:
  - Pool 1: Edinburgh (Scotland) 27–31 (England) Northampton Saints
    - Standings (after 2 matches): Northampton Saints 8 points, (France) Castres, (Wales) Cardiff Blues 5, Edinburgh 2.
  - Pool 2:
    - Racing Métro (France) 16–9 (France) Clermont
    - Saracens (England) 23–25 (Ireland) Leinster
      - Standings (after 2 matches): Leinster 9 points, Clermont 5, Racing Métro 4, Saracens 1.
  - Pool 3: Munster (Ireland) 45–18 (France) Toulon
    - Standings (after 2 matches): Munster 6 points, (Wales) Ospreys 5, (England) London Irish, Toulon 4.
  - Pool 4: Aironi (Italy) 6–22 (England) Bath
    - Standings: Bath 6 points (2 matches), (Ireland) Ulster 5 (1), (France) Biarritz 4 (1), Aironi 0 (2).
  - Pool 6: Newport Gwent Dragons (Wales) 19–40 (France) Toulouse
    - Standings: Toulouse 8 points (2 matches), (Scotland) Glasgow 4 (1), (England) London Wasps 1 (1), Newport Gwent Dragons 0 (2).
- Amlin Challenge Cup pool stage, matchday 2:
  - Pool 1: Harlequins (England) 55–17 (Italy) Cavalieri Prato
    - Standings (after 2 matches): Harlequins 6 points, (Ireland) Connacht, (France) Bayonne 5, Cavalieri Prato 4.
  - Pool 2: Petrarca Padova (Italy) 9–56 (England) Sale Sharks
    - Standings: Sale Sharks 10 points (2 matches), (France) Brive 5 (1), (Spain) El Salvador 0 (1), Petrarca Padova 0 (2).
  - Pool 4: București Oaks (Romania) 20–19 (Italy) Overmach Parma
    - Standings: (France) Stade Français 5 points (1 match), (England) Leeds Carnegie 4 (1), București Oaks 4 (2), Overmach Parma 1 (2).
  - Pool 5:
    - Gloucester (England) 90–7 (Italy) Rovigo
    - La Rochelle (France) 30–23 (France) Agen
      - Standings (after 2 matches): La Rochelle 10 points, Gloucester 6, Agen 5, Rovigo 0.
- (South Africa) Currie Cup semifinals:
  - Sharks 16–12 Blue Bulls
  - Western Province 31–7 Free State Cheetahs

=== October 15, 2010 (Friday) ===
==== Auto racing ====
- Nationwide Series:
  - Dollar General 300 in Concord, North Carolina: (1) (Michigan) Brad Keselowski (Dodge; Penske Racing) (2) (New Jersey) Martin Truex Jr. (Toyota; Diamond-Waltrip Racing) (3) (Illinois) Justin Allgaier (Dodge; Penske Racing)
    - Drivers' championship standings (after 31 of 35 races): (1) Keselowski 4954 points (2) (Missouri) Carl Edwards (Ford; Roush Fenway Racing) 4504 (3) (Nevada) Kyle Busch (Toyota; Joe Gibbs Racing) 4439

==== Baseball ====
- Major League Baseball postseason:
  - American League Championship Series:
    - Game 1, New York Yankees 6, Texas Rangers 5. Yankees lead series 1–0.
- Nippon Professional Baseball Climax Series:
  - Pacific League Final Stage:
    - Game 2, Fukuoka SoftBank Hawks 3, Chiba Lotte Marines 1. Hawks lead series 2–1.

==== Basketball ====
- NCAA (Philippines) at San Juan, Philippines:
  - Men's Finals: San Beda College 85, San Sebastian College-Recoletos 70, **San Beda wins series in 2 games**
    - San Beda win 15th NCAA championship by winning all 16 elimination round games and 2 games in the Finals.

==== Cricket ====
- Zimbabwe in South Africa:
  - 1st ODI in Bloemfontein: South Africa 351/6 (50 overs; Colin Ingram 124, Hashim Amla 110); Zimbabwe 287/6 (50 overs; Brendan Taylor 145*). **South Africa win by 64 runs; lead 3-match series 1–0.**

==== Figure skating ====
- ISU Junior Grand Prix in Ostrava, Czech Republic: (skaters in **bold** qualify for ISU Junior Grand Prix Final)
  - Ice dance – short dance: (1) Ekaterina Pushkash / Jonathan Guerreiro (RUS) 57.88 (2) Tiffany Zahorski / Alexis Miart (FRA) 52.69 (3) Marina Antipova / Artem Kudashev (RUS) 52.16
  - Pairs: (gold) **Yu Xiaoyu / Jin Yang** (CHN) 138.66 (silver) **Ashley Cain / Joshua Reagan** (USA) 134.14 (bronze) **Natasha Purich / Raymond Schultz** (CAN) 131.77
    - Final standings: **Ksenia Stolbova / Fedor Klimov** (RUS) 30 points, **Sui Wenjing / Han Cong** (CHN) 28, Yu / Jin, **Narumi Takahashi / Mervin Tran** (JPN) 26, Purich / Schultz 22, **Anna Silaeva / Artur Minchuk** (RUS) 20, Cain / Reagan 18, **Taylor Steele / Robert Schultz** (CAN), Brittany Jones / Kurtis Gaskell (CAN), Tatiana Danilova / Andrei Novoselov (RUS) 14.
  - Ladies: (gold) Vanessa Lam (USA) 156.41 (silver) **Risa Shoji** (JPN) 155.23 (bronze) **Polina Shelepen** (RUS) 152.92
    - Final standings: **Adelina Sotnikova** (RUS), **Elizaveta Tuktamysheva** (RUS) 30 points, Shoji 28, Shelepen, **Christina Gao** (USA), **Yasmin Siraj** (USA) 26, **Kristiene Gong** (USA) 22, **Kiri Baga** (USA), Li Zijun (CHN), Ira Vannut (BEL) 20.

==== Football (soccer) ====
- Caribbean Championship Qualifying Group Stage One: (teams in **bold** advance to Qualifying Group Stage Two)
  - Group C in Paramaribo, Suriname:
    - Netherlands Antilles 2–3 **Guyana**
    - **Suriname** 2–1 Saint Lucia
      - Standings (after 2 matches): Guyana, Suriname 6 points, Netherlands Antilles, Saint Lucia 0.
  - Group D in San Cristóbal, Dominican Republic: British Virgin Islands 0–10 Dominica
    - Standings: Dominican Republic, Dominica 3 points (1 match), British Virgin Islands 0 (2).
- Copa Libertadores de Fútbol Femenino in Barueri, São Paulo, Brazil:
  - Semifinals:
    - **Everton** (Chile) 0–0 (5–4 pen.) (Ecuador) Deportivo Quito
    - **Santos** (Brazil) 2–0 (Argentina) Boca Juniors

==== Rugby union ====
- Heineken Cup pool stage, matchday 2:
  - Pool 1: Castres (France) 27–20 (Wales) Cardiff Blues
    - Standings: Castres, Cardiff Blues 5 points (2 matches), (England) Northampton Saints 4 (1), (Scotland) Edinburgh 1 (1).
  - Pool 3: Ospreys (Wales) 27–16 (England) London Irish
    - Standings: Ospreys 5 points (2 matches), (France) Toulon 4 (1), London Irish 4 (2), (Ireland) Munster 1 (1).
- Amlin Challenge Cup pool stage, matchday 2:
  - Pool 1: Connacht (Ireland) 16–13 (France) Bayonne
    - Standings: Connacht, Bayonne 5 points (2 matches); (Italy) Cavalieri Prato 4 (1), (England) Harlequins 1 (1).
  - Pool 3: Bourgoin (France) 19–34 (England) Exeter Chiefs
    - Standings (after 2 matches): (France) Montpellier 8 points, Exeter Chiefs 5, (England) Newcastle Falcons 4, Bourgoin 1.

=== October 14, 2010 (Thursday) ===
==== Baseball ====
- Nippon Professional Baseball Climax Series:
  - Pacific League Final Stage:
    - Game 1, Chiba Lotte Marines 3, Fukuoka SoftBank Hawks 1. Series tied 1–1.

==== Basketball ====
- (Israel) Israeli League Cup in Jerusalem:
  - Final: Hapoel Jerusalem 77–87 **Maccabi Tel Aviv**
    - Maccabi Tel Aviv win the Cup for the second time after three years break.

==== Cricket ====
- New Zealand in Bangladesh:
  - 4th ODI in Mirpur: Bangladesh 241 (48.1 overs; Shakib Al Hasan 106); New Zealand 232 (49.3 overs; Kane Williamson 108). **Bangladesh win by 9 runs; lead 5-match series 3–0.**

==== Figure skating ====
- ISU Junior Grand Prix in Ostrava, Czech Republic:
  - Ladies – short program: (1) Vanessa Lam (USA) 53.05 (2) Polina Shelepen (RUS) 50.46 (3) Kiri Baga (USA) 49.74
  - Pairs – short program: (1) Ashley Cain / Joshua Reagan (USA) 46.87 (2) Natasha Purich / Raymond Schultz (CAN) 46.62 (3) Ekaterina Petaikina / Maxim Kurduykov (RUS) 46.24
  - Men – short program: (1) Yan Han (CHN) 66.19 (2) Alexander Majorov (SWE) 62.67 (3) Liu Jiaxing (CHN) 62.59

==== Football (soccer) ====
- Caribbean Championship Qualifying Group Stage One:
  - Group D in San Cristóbal, Dominican Republic: Dominican Republic 17–0 British Virgin Islands
- Copa Sudamericana Round of 16, first leg:
  - Universitario (Bolivia) 0–1 (Brazil) Palmeiras

==== Multi-sport events ====
- Commonwealth Games in Delhi, India:
  - Athletics:
    - Men's marathon: (gold) John Kelai (KEN) 2:14:35 (silver) Michael Shelley (AUS) 2:15:28 (bronze) Amos Matui (KEN) 2:15:58
    - Women's marathon: (gold) Irene Kosgei (KEN) 2:34:32 (silver) Irene Mogake (KEN) 2:34:43 (bronze) Lisa Jane Weightman (AUS) 2:35:25
  - Badminton:
    - Mixed doubles: (gold) Chin Eei Hui/Koo Kien Keat (MYS) (silver) Nathan Robertson/Jenny Wallwork (ENG) (bronze) Chayut Triyachart/Yao Lei (SIN)
    - Women's doubles: (gold) Jwala Gutta/Ashwini Machimanda (IND) (silver) Yao Lei/Shinta Sari (SIN) (bronze) Tang He Tian/Kate Wilson-Smith (AUS)
    - Men's singles: (gold) Lee Chong Wei (MYS) (silver) Rajiv Ouseph (ENG) (bronze) Parupalli Kashyap (IND)
    - Men's doubles: (gold) Koo Kien Keat/Tan Boon Heong (MYS) (silver) Nathan Robertson/Anthony Clark (ENG) (bronze) Hendri Saputra/Hendra Wijaya (SIN)
    - Women's singles: (gold) Saina Nehwal (IND) (silver) Wong Mew Choo (MYS) (bronze) Liz Cann (ENG)
  - Gymnastics (rhythmic):
    - Rope: (gold) Chrystalleni Trikomiti (CYP) 25.800 points (silver) Naazmi Johnston (AUS) 25.100 (bronze) Elaine Koon (MYS) 24.950
    - Hoop: (gold) Elaine Koon (MYS) 25.300 points (silver) Francesca Jones (WAL) 24.750 (bronze) Chrystalleni Trikomiti (CYP) 24.500
    - Ball: (gold) Naazmi Johnston (AUS) 25.100 points (silver) Elaine Koon (MYS) 24.500 (bronze) Chrystalleni Trikomiti (CYP) 24.350
    - Ribbon: (gold) Chrystalleni Trikomiti (CYP) 25.700 points (silver) Naazmi Johnston (AUS) 24.600 (bronze) Elaine Koon (MYS) 24.400
  - Hockey:
    - Men's tournament: (gold) Australia (silver) India (bronze) New Zealand
  - Netball:
    - Tournament: (gold) New Zealand (silver) Australia (bronze) England
  - Table tennis:
    - Women's wheelchair singles: (gold) Kate Oputa (NGA) (silver) Catherine Morrow (AUS) (bronze) Faith Obiora (NGA)
    - Women's doubles: (gold) Li Jiawei/Sun Beibei (SIN) (silver) Feng Tianwei/Wang Yuegu (SIN) (bronze) Mouma Das/Poulomi Ghatak (IND)
    - Men's singles: (gold) Yang Zi (SIN) (silver) Gao Ning (SIN) (bronze) Sharath Kamal (IND)

==== Rugby union ====
- Amlin Challenge Cup pool stage, matchday 2:
  - Pool 3: Montpellier (France) 32–8 (England) Newcastle Falcons
    - Standings: Montpellier 8 points (2 matches), Newcastle Falcons 4 (2), (France) Bourgoin, (England) Exeter Chiefs 1 (1).

==== Snooker ====
- Premier League Snooker – League phase in Inverness:
  - Mark Selby (ENG) 5–1 Marco Fu (HKG)
  - Neil Robertson (AUS) 3–3 Mark Williams (WAL)
    - Standings: Selby, Ding Junhui (CHN) 4 points (4 matches), Williams 4 (3), Shaun Murphy (ENG), Ronnie O'Sullivan (ENG), Fu 3 (3), Robertson 1 (2).

=== October 13, 2010 (Wednesday) ===
==== Cricket ====
- Australia in India:
  - 2nd Test in Bangalore, day 5: Australia 478 (141 overs) and 223 (75.2 overs); India 495 (144.5 overs) and 207/3 (45 overs). **India win by 7 wickets; win 2-match series 2–0.**

==== Football (soccer) ====
- Caribbean Championship Qualifying Group Stage One:
  - Group C in Paramaribo, Suriname:
    - Guyana 1–0 Saint Lucia
    - Suriname 2–1 Netherlands Antilles
- Copa Sudamericana Round of 16, first leg:
  - Goiás (Brazil) 1–0 (Uruguay) Peñarol
  - Atlético Mineiro (Brazil) 2–0 (Colombia) Santa Fe
  - Emelec (Ecuador) 2–1 (Brazil) Avaí

==== Multi-sport events ====
- Commonwealth Games in Delhi, India:
  - Aquatics (diving):
    - Women's 3m springboard: (gold) Sharleen Stratton (AUS) 376.00 points (silver) Jennifer Abel (CAN) 338.55 (bronze) Jaele Patrick (AUS) 326.15
    - Men's 10m platform: (gold) Tom Daley (ENG) 538.35 points (silver) Matthew Mitcham (AUS) 509.15 (bronze) Bryan Lomas (MYS) 487.15
  - Boxing:
    - Light-flyweight: (gold) Paddy Barnes (NIR) (silver) Japhet Uutoni (NAM) (bronze) Amandeep Singh (IND) (bronze) Muhammad Waseem (PAK)
    - Bantamweight: (gold) Manju Wanniarachchi (SRI) (silver) Sean McGoldrick (WAL) (bronze) Bruno Julie (MRI) (bronze) Tirafalo Seoko (BOT)
    - Lightweight: (gold) Thomas Stalker (ENG) (silver) Josh Taylor (SCO) (bronze) Jai Bhagwan (IND) (bronze) Lomalito Moala (TON)
    - Welterweight: (gold) Patrick Gallagher (NIR) (silver) Callum Smith (ENG) (bronze) Carl Hield (BAH) (bronze) Dilbag Singh (IND)
    - Light-heavyweight: (gold) Callum Johnson (SCO) (silver) Thomas McCarthy (NIR) (bronze) Jermaine Asare (WAL) (bronze) Joshua Makonjio (KEN)
    - Flyweight: (gold) Suranjoy Singh (IND) (silver) Benson Njangiru (KEN) (bronze) Haroon Iqbal (PAK) (bronze) Oteng Oteng (BOT)
    - Light-welterweight: (gold) Manoj Kumar (IND) (silver) Bradley Saunders (ENG) (bronze) Louis Colin (MRI) (bronze) Valentino Knowles (BAH)
    - Middleweight: (gold) Eamonn O'Kane (NIR) (silver) Anthony Ogogo (ENG) (bronze) Keiran Harding (WAL) (bronze) Vijender Singh (IND)
    - Heavyweight: (gold) Simon Vallily (ENG) (silver) Steven Ward (NIR) (bronze) Stephen Simmons (SCO) (bronze) Awusone Yekeni (GHA)
    - Super-heavyweight: (gold) Paramjeet Samota (IND) (silver) Tariq Abdul Haqq (TRI) (bronze) Junior Fa (TON) (bronze) Blaise Yepmou (CMR)
  - Cycling (road):
    - Women's time trial: (gold) Tara Whitten (CAN) 38:59.30 (silver) Linda Villumsen (NZL) 39:04.15 (bronze) Julia Shaw (ENG) 39:09.52
    - Men's time trial: (gold) David Millar (SCO) 47:18.66 (silver) Alex Dowsett (ENG) 48:13.48 (bronze) Luke Durbridge (AUS) 48:19.22
  - Gymnastics (rhythmic):
    - Women's individual all-around: (gold) Naazmi Johnston (AUS) 100.100 points (silver) Chrystalleni Trikomiti (CYP) 98.975 (bronze) Elaine Koon (MYS) 96.000
  - Hockey:
    - Women's tournament: (gold) Australia (silver) New Zealand (bronze) England
  - Lawn bowls:
    - Women's singles: (gold) Natalie Melmore (ENG) (silver) Val Smith (NZL) (bronze) Kelsey Cottrell (AUS)
    - Men's singles: (gold) Robert Weale (WAL) (silver) Leif Selby (AUS) (bronze) Gary Kelly (NIR)
  - Shooting:
    - Men's 25m standard pistol singles: (gold) Bin Gai (SIN) 570 points (silver) Roger Daniel (TRI) 563 (bronze) Samaresh Jung (IND) 559
    - Open full bore pairs: (gold) New Zealand (Mike Collings, John Snowden) 588 points (GR) (silver) Scotland 587 (bronze) England 584
    - Women's 10m air pistol singles: (gold) Bibiana Ng (MYS) 481.9 points (silver) Heena Sidhu (IND) 481.6 (bronze) Dina Aspandiyarova (AUS) 478.8
    - Open full bore singles: (gold) Parag Patel (ENG) 396 points (GR) (silver) James Corbett (AUS) 395 (bronze) David Calvert (NIR) 393
    - Men's 50m prone rifle singles: (gold) Jonathan Hammond (SCO) 696.9 points (silver) Warren Potent (AUS) 695.4 (bronze) Matthew Hall (NIR) 694.1
    - Men's skeet singles: (gold) Richard Brickell (ENG) 144+7 points (silver) Georgios Achilleos (CYP) 144+6 (bronze) Andreas Chasikos (CYP) 143+6+2
  - Squash:
    - Women's doubles: (gold) Jaclyn Hawkes/Joelle King (NZL) (silver) Jenny Duncalf/Laura Massaro (ENG) (bronze) Kasey Brown/Donna Urquhart (AUS)
    - Mixed doubles: (gold) Kasey Brown/Cameron Pilley (AUS) (silver) Joelle King/Martin Knight (NZL) (bronze) Nicol David/Beng Hee Ong (MYS)
    - Men's doubles: (gold) Adrian Grant/Nick Matthew (ENG) (silver) Stewart Boswell/David Palmer (AUS) (bronze) Ryan Cuskelly/Cameron Pilley (AUS)
  - Table tennis:
    - Men's doubles: (gold) Sharath Kamal/Subhajit Saha (IND) (silver) Gao Ning/Yang Zi (SIN) (bronze) Andrew Baggaley/Liam Pitchford (ENG)
    - Women's singles: (gold) Feng Tianwei (SIN) (silver) Yu Mengyu (SIN) (bronze) Wang Yuegu (SIN)

=== October 12, 2010 (Tuesday) ===
==== Baseball ====
- Major League Baseball postseason:
  - American League Division Series:
    - Game 5, Texas Rangers 5, Tampa Bay Rays 1. **Rangers win series 3–2.**
      - The Rangers win a postseason series for the first time in franchise history. This is also the first MLB postseason series ever in which all games were won by the road team.

==== Cricket ====
- Australia in India:
  - 2nd Test in Bangalore, day 4: Australia 478 (141 overs) and 202/7 (65 overs); India 495 (144.5 overs; Sachin Tendulkar 214). Australia lead by 185 runs with 3 wickets remaining.

==== Football (soccer) ====
- UEFA Euro 2012 qualifying, matchday 4:
  - Group A:
    - Azerbaijan 1–0 Turkey
    - Kazakhstan 0–3 Germany
    - Belgium 4–4 Austria
      - Standings: Germany 12 points (4 matches), Austria 7 (3), Turkey 6 (4), Belgium 4 (4), Azerbaijan 3 (3), Kazakhstan 0 (4).
  - Group B:
    - Armenia 4–0 Andorra
    - North Macedonia 0–1 Russia
    - Slovakia 1–1 Republic of Ireland
      - Standings (after 4 matches): Russia 9 points, Armenia, Republic of Ireland, Slovakia 7 points, Macedonia 4, Andorra 0.
  - Group C:
    - Faroe Islands 1–1 Northern Ireland
    - Italy 0–0 Serbia (match abandoned after 6 minutes due to crowd trouble)
      - On 29 October, Italy were awarded a 3–0 victory. (AP via USA Today)
    - Estonia 0–1 Slovenia
      - Standings: Italy 10 points (4 matches), Slovenia 7 (4), Estonia 6 (4), Northern Ireland 5 (3), Serbia 4 (4), Faroe Islands 1 (5).
  - Group D:
    - Belarus 2–0 Albania
    - France 2–0 Luxembourg
      - Standings: France 9 points (4 matches), Belarus 8 (4), Albania 5 (4), Bosnia and Herzegovina 4 (3), Romania 2 (3), Luxembourg 1 (4).
  - Group E:
    - Finland 1–2 Hungary
    - Netherlands 4–1 Sweden
    - San Marino 0–2 Moldova
      - Standings: Netherlands 12 points (4 matches), Hungary 9 (4), Sweden 6 (3), Moldova 6 (4), Finland 0 (3), San Marino 0 (4).
  - Group F:
    - Latvia 1–1 Georgia
    - Greece 2–1 Israel
    - Standings: Greece 8 points (4 matches), Croatia 7 (3), Georgia 6 (4), Israel, Latvia 4 (4), Malta 0 (3).
  - Group G:
    - Switzerland 4–1 Wales
    - England 0–0 Montenegro
      - Standings: Montenegro 10 points (4 matches), England 7 (3), Switzerland, Bulgaria 3 (3), Wales 0 (3).
  - Group H:
    - Iceland 1–3 Portugal
    - Denmark 2–0 Cyprus
      - Standings: Norway 9 points (3 matches), Portugal 7 (4), Denmark 6 (3), Cyprus 1 (3), Iceland 0 (3).
  - Group I:
    - Liechtenstein 0–2 Czech Republic
    - Scotland 2–3 Spain
      - Standings: Spain 9 points (3 matches), Czech Republic 6 (3), Scotland 4 (4), Lithuania 4 (3), Liechtenstein 0 (3).
- 2011 UEFA European Under-21 Championship qualification play-offs, second leg (teams in **bold** qualify for Final Tournament; first leg score in parentheses):
  - Romania 0–0 (1–2) **England**. England win 2–1 on aggregate.
  - Croatia 0–3 (1–2) **Spain**. Spain win 5–1 on aggregate.
  - **Belarus** 3–0 (a.e.t.) (0–2) Italy. Belarus win 3–2 on aggregate.
  - Greece 0–2 (0–3) **Czech Republic**. Czech Republic win 5–0 on aggregate.
  - **Ukraine** 0–2 (3–1) Netherlands. 3–3 on aggregate, Ukraine advance on away goals rule.
- Copa Sudamericana Round of 16, second leg (first leg score in parentheses):
  - **Deportes Tolima** (Colombia) 3–0 (0–2) (Argentina) Banfield. 3–3 on points; Deportes Tolima win 3–2 on aggregate.
- Copa Sudamericana Round of 16, first leg:
  - Unión San Felipe (Chile) 4–2 (Ecuador) LDU Quito
- Copa Libertadores de Fútbol Femenino in Barueri, São Paulo, Brazil: (teams in **bold** advance to the semifinals)
  - Group B:
    - **Boca Juniors** (Argentina) 1–1 (Chile) **Everton**
    - Universidad Autónoma (Paraguay) 7–0 (Peru) UP de Iquitos
      - Final standings: Everton 10 points, Boca Juniors 8, Universidad Autónoma 7, (Bolivia) Florida 3, UP de Iquitos 0.

==== Multi-sport events ====
- Commonwealth Games in Delhi, India:
  - Aquatics (diving):
    - Men's 10m synchronised platform: (gold) Max Brick/Tom Daley (ENG) 439.65 points (silver) Matthew Mitcham/Ethan Warren (AUS) 423.81 (bronze) Kevin Geyson/Eric Sehn (CAN) 394.80
    - Women's 1m springboard: (gold) Jennifer Abel (CAN) 301.75 points (silver) Sharleen Stratton (AUS) 299.15 (bronze) Émilie Heymans (CAN) 296.10
    - Men's 3m synchronised springboard: (gold) Alexandre Despatie/Reuben Ross (CAN) 430.35 points (silver) Matthew Mitcham/Ethan Warren (AUS) 424.47 (bronze) Bryan Lomas/Ken Yeoh (MYS) 404.64
  - Athletics:
    - Men's:
      - Javelin throw: (gold) Jarrod Bannister (AUS) 81.71m (silver) Stuart Farquhar (NZL) 78.15m (bronze) Kashinath Naik (IND) 74.29m
      - Triple jump: (gold) Tosin Oke (NGA) 17.16m (silver) Lucien Mamba Schlick (CMR) 17.14m (bronze) Renjith Maheshwary (IND) 17.07m
      - 4 × 100 m relay: (gold) England (Ryan Scott, Leon Baptiste, Marlon Devonish, Mark Lewis-Francis) 38.74 (silver) Jamaica 38.79 (bronze) India 38.89
      - 1500m: (gold) Silas Kiplagat (KEN) 3:41.78 (silver) James Magut (KEN) 3:42.27 (bronze) Nick Willis (NZL) 3:42.38
      - 4 × 400 m relay: (gold) Australia (Joel Milburn, Kevin Moore, Brendan Cole, Sean Wroe) 3:03.30 (silver) Kenya 3:03.84 (bronze) England 3:03.97
    - Women's:
      - Pole vault: (gold) Alana Boyd (AUS) 4.40m (silver) Marianna Zachariadi (CYP) 4.40m (bronze) Kate Dennison (ENG) 4.25m (bronze) Carly Dockendorf (CAN) 4.25m (bronze) Kelsie Hendry (CAN) 4.25m
      - 4 × 100 m relay: (gold) England (Katherine Endacott, Montell Douglas, Laura Turner, Abiodun Oyepitan) 44.19 (silver) Ghana 45.24 (bronze) India 45.25
      - 5000m: (gold) Vivian Cheruiyot (KEN) 15:55.12 (silver) Sylvia Jebiwott Kibet (KEN) 15:55.61 (bronze) Iness Chepkesis Chenonge (KEN) 16:02.47
      - 4 × 400 m relay: India (Manjit Kaur, Sini Jose, Ashwini Akkunji, Mandeep Kaur) 3:27.77 (silver) England 3:29.51 (bronze) Canada 3:30.20
  - Gymnastics (rhythmic):
    - Women's team: (gold) Australia (Naazmi Johnston, Janine Murray, Danielle Prince) 235.775 points (silver) Canada 224.325 (bronze) England 220.475
  - Rugby sevens:
    - Men's event: (gold) New Zealand (silver) Australia (bronze) South Africa
  - Shooting:
    - Men's:
      - 25m standard pistol pairs: (gold) Singapore (Bin Gai, Lip Meng Poh) 1116 points (silver) India 1103 (bronze) England 1098
      - 50m prone rifle pairs: (gold) Scotland (Neil Stirton, Jonathan Hammond) 1181 points (silver) England 1178 (bronze) Australia 1174+64
    - Women's:
      - 10m air pistol pairs: (gold) India (Heena Sidhu, Annu Raj Singh) 759+21 points (silver) Australia 759+21 (bronze) Canada 759+14
      - 50m prone rifle singles: (gold) Jennifer McIntosh (SCO) 597 points (GR) (silver) Tejaswini Sawant (IND) 594 (bronze) Johanne Brekke (WAL) 593
  - Table tennis:
    - Mixed doubles: (gold) Yang Zi/Wang Yuegu (SIN) (silver) Feng Tianwei/Gao Ning (SIN) (bronze) Paul Drinkhall/Joanna Parker (ENG)
  - Weightlifting:
    - Women's powerlifting bench press: (gold) Esther Oyema (NGR) 148.1 kg (silver) Ganiyatu Onaolopo (NGR) 139.3 kg (bronze) Osamwenyobor Arasomwan (NGR) 124.6 kg
    - Men's powerlifting bench press: (gold) Yakunu Adesokan (NGR) 215.1 kg (silver) Anthony Ulonnam (NGR) 210.6 kg (bronze) Ikechukwu Obichukwu (NGR) 196 kg

=== October 11, 2010 (Monday) ===
==== American football ====
- NFL, Week 5:
  - Monday Night Football: New York Jets 29, Minnesota Vikings 20

==== Baseball ====
- Major League Baseball postseason:
  - National League Division Series:
    - Game 4, San Francisco Giants 3, Atlanta Braves 2. **Giants win series 3–1.**
      - The Giants book a place in the NLCS against the Philadelphia Phillies and end the managing career of Braves skipper Bobby Cox.

==== Cricket ====
- Australia in India:
  - 2nd Test in Bangalore, day 3: Australia 478 (141 overs); India 435/5 (122 overs; Sachin Tendulkar 191*, Murali Vijay 139). India trail by 43 runs with 5 wickets remaining in the 1st innings.
- New Zealand in Bangladesh:
  - 3rd ODI in Mirpur: New Zealand 173 (42.5 overs); Bangladesh 177/3 (40 overs). **Bangladesh win by 7 wickets; lead 5-match series 2–0.**
- Afghanistan in Kenya:
  - 3rd ODI in Nairobi: Afghanistan 188 (43 overs); Kenya 189/2 (41.3 overs). **Kenya win by 8 wickets; win 3-match series 2–1.**

==== Football (soccer) ====
- 2011 UEFA European Under-21 Championship qualification play-offs, second leg (teams in **bold** qualify for Final Tournament; first leg score in parentheses):
  - Sweden 1–1 (1–4) **Switzerland**. Switzerland win 5–2 on aggregate.
  - Scotland 1–2 (1–2) **Iceland**. Iceland win 4–2 on aggregate.
- Copa Libertadores de Fútbol Femenino in Barueri, São Paulo, Brazil: (teams in **bold** advance to the semifinals)
  - Group A:
    - **Santos** (Brazil) 7–0 (Ecuador) **Deportivo Quito**
    - Formas Íntimas (Colombia) 1–2 (Uruguay) River Plate
      - Final standings: Santos 12 points, Deportivo Quito 7, River Plate 4, (Venezuela) Caracas, Formas Íntimas 3.

==== Multi-sport events ====
- Commonwealth Games in Delhi, India:
  - Aquatics (diving):
    - Men's 3m springboard: (gold) Alexandre Despatie (CAN) 513.75 points (silver) Reuben Ross (CAN) 457.15 (bronze) Grant Nel (AUS) 456.55
    - Women's 10m platform: (gold) Pandelela Rinong Pamg (MYS) 371.05 points (silver) Melissa Wu (AUS) 369.50 (bronze) Alex Croak (AUS) 355.40
  - Athletics:
    - Men's:
      - Pole vault: (gold) Steven Hooker (AUS) 5.60m (silver) Steven Lewis (ENG) 5.60m (bronze) Max Eaves (ENG) 5.40m
      - 3000m steeplechase: (gold) Richard Mateelong (KEN) 8:16.39 (silver) Ezekiel Kemboi (KEN) 8:18.47 (bronze) Brimin Kipruto (KEN) 8:19.65
      - 10,000m: (gold) Moses Ndiema Kipsiro (UGA) 27:57.39 (silver) Daniel Salel (KEN) 27:57.57 (bronze) Joseph Birech (KEN) 27:58.58
    - Women's:
      - 100m hurdles: (gold) Sally Pearson (AUS) 12.67 (silver) Angela Whyte (CAN) 12.98 (bronze) Andrea Miller (NZL) 13.25
      - Discus throw: (gold) Krishna Poonia (IND) 61.51m (silver) Harwant Kaur (IND) 60.16m (bronze) Seema Antil (IND) 58.46m
      - 200m: (gold) Cydonie Mothersille (CAY) 22.89 (silver) Abiodun Oyepitan (ENG) 23.26 (bronze) Adrienne Power (CAN) 23.52
      - 800m: (gold) Nancy Langat (KEN) 2:00.01 (silver) Nikki Hamblin (NZL) 2:00.05 (bronze) Diane Cummins (CAN) 2:00.13
  - Lawn bowls:
    - Men's pairs: (gold) South Africa (Shaun Addinall, Gerald Baker) (silver) England (bronze) Malaysia
    - Women's pairs: (gold) England (Ellen Falkner, Amy Monkhouse) (silver) Malaysia (bronze) Wales
  - Shooting:
    - Women's prone 50m rifle pairs: (gold) Scotland (Jen McIntosh, Kay Copland) 1169+60 points (silver) England 1169+52 (bronze) India 1168
    - Men's skeet pairs: (gold) Cyprus (Georgios Achilleos, Andreas Chasikos) 194 points (EGR) (silver) Canada 191 (bronze) England 191
  - Weightlifting:
    - Men's +105 kg: (gold) Damon Kelly (AUS) 397 kg (silver) Itte Detenamo (NRU) 397 kg (bronze) George Kobaladze (CAN) 386 kg

==== Tennis ====
- ATP World Tour:
  - China Open:
    - Final: **Novak Djokovic** (SRB) def. David Ferrer (ESP) 6–2, 6–4
      - Djokovic wins his second title of the season and the 18th of his career.
- WTA Tour:
  - China Open:
    - Final: **Caroline Wozniacki** (DEN) def. Vera Zvonareva (RUS) 6–3, 3–6, 6–3
      - Wozniacki wins her sixth title of the season and the 12th of her career. Wozniacki also becomes World No. 1 for the first time in her career.

=== October 10, 2010 (Sunday) ===
==== American football ====
- NFL, Week 5:
  - Indianapolis Colts 19, Kansas City Chiefs 9
    - The Colts knock off the league's last unbeaten team.
  - Jacksonville Jaguars 36, Buffalo Bills 26
  - Tampa Bay Buccaneers 24, Cincinnati Bengals 21
  - Atlanta Falcons 20, Cleveland Browns 10
  - Detroit Lions 44, St. Louis Rams 6
  - Baltimore Ravens 31, Denver Broncos 17
  - Chicago Bears 23, Carolina Panthers 6
  - Washington Redskins 16, Green Bay Packers 13 (OT)
  - New York Giants 34, Houston Texans 10
  - Arizona Cardinals 30, New Orleans Saints 20
  - Tennessee Titans 34, Dallas Cowboys 27
  - Oakland Raiders 35, San Diego Chargers 27
  - Sunday Night Football: Philadelphia Eagles 27, San Francisco 49ers 24
  - Byes: Miami Dolphins, New England Patriots, Pittsburgh Steelers, Seattle Seahawks

==== Athletics ====
- World Marathon Majors:
  - Chicago Marathon:
    - Men: (gold) Samuel Wanjiru (KEN) 2:06:24 (silver) Tsegaye Kebede (ETH) 2:06:43 (bronze) Feyisa Lilesa (ETH) 2:08:10
      - Wanjiru wins the race for the second straight year.
      - World Marathon Majors standings: (1) Wanjiru 75 points (2) Kebede 65 (3) Deriba Merga (ETH), Emmauel Mutai (KEN) 35
    - Women: (gold) Liliya Shobukhova (RUS) 2:20:25 (silver) Atsede Baysa (ETH) 2:23:40 (bronze) Mariya Konovalova (RUS) 2:23:50
      - Shobukhova wins the race for the second straight year.
      - World Marathon Majors standings: (1) Shobukhova 85 points (2) Irina Mikitenko (GER) 41 (3) Salina Kosgei (KEN) 36
      - Shobukhova secures the title with one event (New York City Marathon) remaining.

==== Auto racing ====
- Formula One:
  - Japanese Grand Prix in Suzuka: (1) Sebastian Vettel (GER) (Red Bull–Renault) (2) Mark Webber (AUS) (Red Bull-Renault) (3) Fernando Alonso (ESP) (Ferrari)
    - Drivers' championship standings (after 16 of 19 races): (1) Webber 220 points (2) Alonso 206 (3) Vettel 206
    - Constructors' championship standings: (1) Red Bull 426 points (2) McLaren 381 (3) Ferrari 334
- Chase for the Sprint Cup:
  - Pepsi Max 400 in Fontana: (1) (Indiana) Tony Stewart (Chevrolet; Stewart Haas Racing) (2) (Kansas) Clint Bowyer (Chevrolet; Richard Childress Racing) (3) (California) Jimmie Johnson (Chevrolet; Hendrick Motorsports)
    - Drivers' championship standings (after 30 of 36 races): (1) Johnson 5673 points (2) (Virginia) Denny Hamlin (Toyota; Joe Gibbs Racing) 5637 (3) (California) Kevin Harvick (Chevrolet; Richard Childress Racing) 5619
- V8 Supercars:
  - Supercheap Auto Bathurst 1000 in Bathurst, New South Wales: (1) Craig Lowndes (AUS)/Mark Skaife (AUS) (Holden Commodore) (2) Jamie Whincup (AUS)/Steve Owen (AUS) (Holden Commodore) (3) Garth Tander (AUS)/Cameron McConville (AUS) (Holden Commodore)
    - Drivers' championship standings (after 18 of 26 races): (1) James Courtney (AUS) (Ford Falcon) 2323 points (2) Whincup 2198 (3) Lowndes 2039

==== Baseball ====
- Major League Baseball postseason:
  - American League Division Series:
    - Game 4, Tampa Bay Rays 5, Texas Rangers 2. Series tied 2–2.
  - National League Division Series:
    - Game 3, San Francisco Giants 3, Atlanta Braves 2. Giants lead series 2–1.
    - Game 3, Philadelphia Phillies 2, Cincinnati Reds 0. **Phillies win series 3–0.**
- Nippon Professional Baseball Climax Series:
  - Pacific League First Stage:
    - Game 2, Chiba Lotte Marines 5, Saitama Seibu Lions 4 (11 innings). **Marines win series 2–0**.

==== Cricket ====
- Australia in India:
  - 2nd Test in Bangalore, day 2: Australia 478 (141 overs; Marcus North 128); India 128/2 (34.2 overs). India trail by 350 runs with 8 wickets remaining in the 1st innings.
- Zimbabwe in South Africa:
  - 2nd T20I in Kimberley: South Africa 194/6 (20 overs); Zimbabwe 186/7 (20 overs). **South Africa win by 8 runs; win 2-match series 2–0.**

==== Equestrianism ====
- FEI World Games in Lexington, Kentucky, United States:
  - Four-in-Hand-Driving Individual: (gold) Boyd Exell (AUS) 134.04 points (silver) IJsbrand Chardon (NED) 135.24 (bronze) Tucker Johnson (USA) 150.06
  - Four-in-Hand-Driving Team: (gold) Netherlands 279.77 points (silver) United States 300.92 (bronze) Germany 322.20
  - Para Dressage Individual – Freestyle Tests Grade IV: (gold) Sophie Wells (GBR) on Pinocchio 78.50% (silver) Michele George (BEL) on FBW Rainman 78.05% (bronze) Frank Hosmar (NED) on Tiesto 77.25%
  - Vaulting Team: (gold) United States 8.029 points (silver) Germany 8.010 (bronze) Austria 7.990

==== Football (soccer) ====
- Africa Cup of Nations qualification, matchday 2:
  - Group A: Zimbabwe 0–0 Cape Verde
    - Standings (after 2 matches): Cape Verde 4 points, Mali 3, Zimbabwe 2, Liberia 1.
  - Group B:
    - Madagascar 0–1 Ethiopia
    - Guinea 1–0 Nigeria
      - Standings (after 2 matches): Guinea 6 points, Nigeria, Ethiopia 3, Madagaskar 0.
  - Group C: Libya 1–0 Zambia
    - Standings (after 2 matches): Mozambique, Libya 4 points, Zambia 3, Comoros 0.
  - Group D: Central African Republic 2–0 Algeria
    - Standings (after 2 matches): Central African Republic, Morocco 4 points, Tanzania, Algeria 1.
  - Group G:
    - Niger 1–0 Egypt
    - Sierra Leone 0–0 South Africa
      - Standings (after 2 matches): South Africa 4 points, Niger 3, Sierra Leone 2, Egypt 1.
  - Group I:
    - Ghana 0–0 Sudan
    - Congo 3–1 Swaziland
      - Standings (after 2 matches): Ghana, Sudan 4 points, Congo 3, Swaziland 0.
  - Group K: Togo 1–2 Tunisia
    - Standings (after 4 matches): Botswana 10 points, Tunisia 7, Malawi 6, Togo 2, Chad 1.
- Caribbean Championship Qualifying Group Stage One: (teams in **bold** advance to Qualifying Group Stage Two)
  - Group B in Kingstown, Saint Vincent and the Grenadines:
    - **Saint Kitts and Nevis** 4–0 Montserrat
    - **Saint Vincent** 0–0 Barbados
      - Final standings: Saint Kitts and Nevis, Saint Vincent, Barbados 5 points, Montserrat 0.
- Copa Libertadores de Fútbol Femenino in Barueri, São Paulo, Brazil: (teams in **bold** advance to the semifinals)
  - Group B:
    - Boca Juniors (Argentina) 2–2 (Paraguay) Universidad Autónoma
    - **Everton** (Chile) 6–0 (Bolivia) Florida
      - Standings: Everton 9 points (3 matches), Boca Juniors 7 (3), Universidad Autónoma 4 (3), Florida 3 (4), (Peru) UP de Iquitos 0 (3).

==== Golf ====
- Constellation Energy Senior Players Championship in Potomac, Maryland, United States:
  - Final leaderboard (all USA): (T1) Mark O'Meara & Michael Allen 273 (−7) (3) Loren Roberts 275 (−5)
  - Sudden-death playoff: O'Meara 4 (E) def. Allen 5 (+1)
    - O'Meara wins his first senior major, and second Champions Tour title.
- PGA Tour Fall Series:
  - McGladrey Classic in Sea Island, Georgia:
    - Winner: Heath Slocum (USA) 266 (−14)
      - Slocum wins his fourth career PGA Tour title.
- European Tour:
  - Alfred Dunhill Links Championship in Scotland:
    - Winner: Martin Kaymer (GER) 271 (−17)
      - Kaymer wins his third European Tour title of the season, and eighth overall.
- LPGA Tour:
  - Navistar LPGA Classic in Prattville, Alabama:
    - Winner: Katherine Hull (AUS) 269 (−19)
      - Hull wins her second career LPGA Tour title.

==== Motorcycle racing ====
- Moto GP:
  - Malaysian Grand Prix in Sepang:
    - MotoGP: (1) Valentino Rossi (ITA) (Yamaha) (2) Andrea Dovizioso (ITA) (Honda) (3) Jorge Lorenzo (ESP) (Yamaha)
      - Riders' championship standings (after 15 of 18 rounds): (1) Lorenzo 313 points (2) Dani Pedrosa (ESP) (Honda) 228 (3) Rossi 181
        - Lorenzo seals his first premier class world title.
      - Manufacturers' championship standings: (1) Yamaha 334 points (2) Honda 305 (3) Ducati 230
    - Moto2: (1) Roberto Rolfo (ITA) (Suter) (2) Alex de Angelis (SMR) (Motobi) (3) Andrea Iannone (ITA) (Speed Up)
      - Riders' championship standings (after 14 of 17 rounds): (1) Toni Elías (ESP) (Moriwaki) 262 points (2) Julián Simón (ESP) (Suter) 168 (3) Iannone 163
        - Elías becomes the first Moto2 World Champion.
      - Manufacturers' championship standings: (1) Moriwaki 287 points (2) Suter 261 (3) Speed Up 188
    - 125cc: (1) Marc Márquez (ESP) (Derbi) (2) Pol Espargaró (ESP) (Derbi) (3) Nicolás Terol (ESP) (Aprilia)
      - Riders' championship standings (after 14 of 17 rounds): (1) Márquez 247 points (2) Terol 244 (3) Espargaró 235
      - Manufacturers' championship standings: (1) Derbi 335 points (2) Aprilia 287 (3) Honda 20

==== Multi-sport events ====
- Commonwealth Games in Delhi, India:
  - Aquatics (diving):
    - Women's synchronised 3m springboard: (gold) Jennifer Abel/Émilie Heymans (CAN) 318.90 points (silver) Briony Cole/Sharleen Stratton (AUS) 300.84 (bronze) Jaele Patrick/Olivia Wright (AUS) 295.32
    - Men's 1m springboard: (gold) Alexandre Despatie (CAN) 468.15 points (silver) Matthew Mitcham (AUS) 441.00 (bronze) Scott Robertson (AUS) 409.15
    - Women's synchronised 10m platform: (gold) Melissa Wu/Alex Croak (AUS) 335.76 points (silver) Pandelela Rinong Pamg/Mun Yee Leong (MYS) 328.38 (bronze) Briony Cole/Anabelle Smith (AUS) 325.50
  - Archery:
    - Women's recurve individual: (gold) Deepika Kumari (IND) (silver) Alison Williamson (ENG) (bronze) Dola Banerjee (IND)
    - Men's recurve individual: (gold) Rahul Banerjee (IND) (silver) Jason Lyon (CAN) (bronze) Jayanta Talukdar (IND)
  - Athletics:
    - Men's:
      - Discus throw: (gold) Benn Harradine (AUS) 65.45m (silver) Vikas Gowda (IND) 63.69m (bronze) Carl Myerscough (ENG) 60.64m
      - 1500m T54: (gold) Kurt Fearnley (AUS) 3:19.86 (silver) Richard Colman (AUS) 3:20.90 (bronze) Josh Cassidy (CAN) 3:21.14
      - 400m hurdles: (gold) David Greene (WAL) 48.52 (silver) L. J. van Zyl (RSA) 48.63 (bronze) Rhys Williams (WAL) 49.19
      - 800m: (gold) Boaz Kiplagat Lalang (KEN) 1:46.60 (silver) Richard Kiplagat (KEN) 1:46.95 (bronze) Abraham Kiplagat (KEN) 1:47.37
      - 200m: (gold) Leon Baptiste (ENG) 20.45 (silver) Lansford Spence (JAM) 20.49 (bronze) Christian Malcolm (WAL) 20.52
    - Women's:
      - High jump: (gold) Nicole Forrester (CAN) 1.91m (silver) Sheree Francis (JAM) 1.88m (bronze) Levern Spencer (LCA) 1.88m
      - 400m hurdles: (gold) Muizat Ajoke Odumosu (NGA) 55.28 (silver) Eilidh Child (SCO) 55.62 (bronze) Nickiesha Wilson (JAM) 56.06
      - Long jump: (gold) Alice Falaiye (CAN) 6.50m (silver) M. A. Prajusha (IND) 6.47m (bronze) Tabia Charles (CAN) 6.44m
  - Cycling (road):
    - Women's road race: (gold) Rochelle Gilmore (AUS) (silver) Lizzie Armitstead (ENG) (bronze) Chloe Hosking (AUS)
    - Men's road race: (gold) Allan Davis (AUS) (silver) Hayden Roulston (NZL) (bronze) David Millar (SCO)
  - Lawn bowls:
    - Women's triples: (gold) South Africa (Tracy-Lee Botha, Susan Nel, Santjie Steyn) (silver) Australia (bronze) England
    - Men's triples: (gold) South Africa (Johann du Plessis, Wayne Perry, Gidion Vermeulen) (silver) Australia (bronze) England
  - Shooting:
    - Men's 25m centrefire pistol singles: (gold) Harpreet Singh (IND) 580 points (silver) Vijay Kumar (IND) 574+49 (bronze) Lip Meng Poh (SIN) 574+48
    - Women's 10m air rifle singles: (gold) Jasmine Ser (SIN) 501.7 points (EGR, FGR) (silver) Nur Ayuni Halim (MYS) 497.5 (bronze) Nur Suryani Mohamed Taibi (MYS) 496.9
    - Men's 25m trap singles: (gold) Aaron Heading (ENG) 147 points (FGR) (silver) Michael Diamond (AUS) 146 (bronze) Manavjit Singh Sandhu (IND) 144+2
  - Tennis:
    - Women's doubles: (gold) Sally Peers/Anastasia Rodionova (AUS) (silver) Jessica Moore/Olivia Rogowska (AUS) (bronze) Rushmi Chakravarthi/Sania Mirza (IND)
    - Men's singles: (gold) Somdev Devvarman (IND) (silver) Greg Jones (AUS) (bronze) Matt Ebden (AUS)
    - Mixed doubles: (gold) Jocelyn Rae/Colin Fleming (SCO) (silver) Anastasia Rodionova/Paul Hanley (AUS) (bronze) Sarah Borwell/Ken Skupski (ENG)
  - Weightlifting:
    - Women's +75 kg: (gold) Ele Opeloge (SAM) 285 kg (GR) (silver) Mariam Usman (NGA) 255 kg (bronze) Deborah Acason (AUS) 245 kg
    - Men's 105 kg: (gold) Niusila Opeloge (SAM) 338 kg (silver) Stanislav Chalaev (NZL) 334 kg (bronze) Curtis Onaghinor (NGA) 332 kg
  - Wrestling:
    - Men's freestyle 55 kg: (gold) Azhar Hussain (PAK) (silver) Ebikewenimo Welson (NGA) (bronze) Anil Kumar (IND)
    - Men's freestyle 66 kg: (gold) Sushil Kumar (IND) (silver) Heinrich Barnes (RSA) (bronze) Chris Prickett (CAN)
    - Men's freestyle 84 kg: (gold) Muhammad Inam (PAK) (silver) Anuj Kumar (IND) (bronze) Andrew Dick (NGA)
    - Men's freestyle 120 kg: (gold) Arjan Bhullar (CAN) (silver) Joginder Kumar (IND) (bronze) Hugues Onanena (CMR)

==== Rugby union ====
- Heineken Cup pool stage, matchday 1:
  - Pool 4: Bath (England) 11–12 (France) Biarritz
  - Pool 6: Toulouse (France) 18–16 (England) London Wasps
- Amlin Challenge Cup pool stage, matchday 1:

==== Snooker ====
- Players Tour Championship:
  - Event 5 in Sheffield:
    - Final: **Ding Junhui** (CHN) 4–1 Jamie Jones (WAL)
      - Ding wins his seventh professional title.
      - Order of Merit (after 7 of 12 events): (1) Barry Pinches (ENG) 17,100 (2) Mark Williams (WAL) 16,400 (3) Mark Selby (ENG) 15,500

==== Snowboarding ====
- Snowboard World Cup in Landgraaf, Netherlands:
  - Men's Parallel slalom: (gold) Andreas Prommegger (AUT) (silver) Roland Fischnaller (ITA) (bronze) Aaron March (ITA)
  - Women's Parallel slalom: (gold) Yekaterina Tudegesheva (RUS) (silver) Heidi Neururer (AUT) (bronze) Alena Zavarzina (RUS)

==== Tennis ====
- ATP World Tour:
  - Rakuten Japan Open Tennis Championships:
    - Final: **Rafael Nadal** (ESP) def. Gaël Monfils (FRA) 6–1, 7–5
      - Nadal wins his seventh title of the season and the 43rd of his career.

==== Volleyball ====
- Men's World Championship in Rome, Italy:
  - 3rd place: (bronze) **Serbia** 3–1 Italy
  - Final: (silver) Cuba 0–3 (gold) **Brazil**
    - Brazil win the title for the third straight time.

=== October 9, 2010 (Saturday) ===
==== American football ====
- NCAA:
  - AP Top 10:
    - (19) South Carolina 35, (1) Alabama 21
    - (2) Ohio State 38, Indiana 10
    - (3) Oregon 43, Washington State 23
    - (4) Boise State 57, Toledo 14
    - (5) TCU 45, Wyoming 0
    - (8) Auburn 37, Kentucky 34
    - Oregon State 29, (9) Arizona 27
    - (10) Utah 68, Iowa State 27
  - Other games:
    - (12) LSU 33, (14) Florida 29
    - (17) Michigan State 34, (18) Michigan 17
    - (23) Florida State 45, (13) Miami 17
  - Played earlier this week: (7) Nebraska
  - Idle: (6) Oklahoma

==== Auto racing ====
- Nationwide Series:
  - CampingWorld.com 300 in Fontana, California: (1) (Nevada) Kyle Busch (Toyota; Joe Gibbs Racing) (2) (Michigan) Brad Keselowski (Dodge; Penske Racing) (3) Kevin Harvick (Chevrolet; Kevin Harvick Inc.)
    - Drivers' championship standings (after 30 of 35 races): (1) Keselowski 4764 points (2) (Missouri) Carl Edwards (Ford; Roush Fenway Racing) 4380 (3) Busch 4279

==== Baseball ====
- Major League Baseball postseason:
  - American League Division Series:
    - Game 3, Tampa Bay Rays 6, Texas Rangers 3. Rangers lead series 2–1.
    - Game 3, New York Yankees 6, Minnesota Twins 1. **Yankees win series 3–0.**
- Nippon Professional Baseball Climax Series:
  - Pacific League First Stage:
    - Game 1, Chiba Lotte Marines 6, Saitama Seibu Lions 5 (11 innings). Marines lead series 1–0.

==== Cricket ====
- Australia in India:
  - 2nd Test in Bangalore, day 1: Australia 285/5 (85.5 overs); India.
- Afghanistan in Kenya:
  - 2nd ODI in Nairobi: Kenya 139 (41 overs); Afghanistan 143/4 (27 overs). **Afghanistan win by 6 wickets; 3-match series level 1–1.**

==== Equestrianism ====
- FEI World Games in Lexington, Kentucky, United States:
  - Driving Marathon: (gold) (silver) (bronze)
  - Jumping The Rolex Top Four: (gold) (silver) (bronze)
  - Para Dressage Individual Championship Tests: (gold) (silver) (bronze)
  - Vaulting Freestyle-Final Female/Male: (gold) (silver) (bronze)

==== Figure skating ====
- ISU Junior Grand Prix in Dresden, Germany: (skaters in **bold** qualify for ISU Junior Grand Prix Final)
  - Men: (gold) **Richard Dornbush** (USA) 195.23 (silver) Gordei Gorshkov (RUS) 185.84 (bronze) Ryuichi Kihara (JPN) 177.92
    - Standings (after 6 of 7 events): **Andrei Rogozine** (CAN) 30 points (2 events), Dornbush, **Joshua Farris** (USA) 28 (2), **Max Aaron** (USA), Zhan Bush (RUS) 24 (2), Gorshkov 22 (2), Jason Brown (USA), Liam Firus (CAN) 18 (2)...Keegan Messing (USA), Yan Han (CHN) 15 (1), Artem Grigoriev (RUS) 13 (1).
  - Ice Dance: (gold) **Evgenia Kosigina / Nikolai Moroshkin** (RUS) 126.92 (silver) Marina Antipova / Artem Kudashev (RUS) 118.80 (bronze) **Charlotte Lichtman / Dean Copely** (USA) 118.21
    - Standings (after 6 of 7 events): **Ksenia Monko / Kirill Khaliavin** (RUS), **Alexandra Stepanova / Ivan Bukin** (RUS) 30 points (2 events), Lichtman / Copely, Kosigina / Moroshkin, **Victoria Sinitsina / Ruslan Zhiganshin** (RUS) 26 (2), Anastasia Cannuscio / Colin McManus (USA) 22 (2), Gabriella Papadakis / Guillaume Cizeron (FRA) 20 (2), Geraldine Bott / Neil Brown (FRA), Lauri Bonacorsi / Travis Mager (USA) 18 (2)... Ekaterina Pushkash / Jonathan Guerreiro (RUS), Anastasia Galyeta / Alexei Shumski (UKR), Antipova / Kudashev 13 (1).

==== Football (soccer) ====
- UEFA Euro 2012 qualifying, matchday 3:
  - Group D: France 2–0 Romania
    - Standings (after 3 matches): France 6 points, Albania, Belarus 5, Bosnia and Herzegovina 4, Romania 2, Luxembourg 1.
  - Group F: Israel 1–2 Croatia
    - Standings (after 3 matches): Croatia 7 points, Georgia, Greece 5, Israel 4, Latvia 3, Malta 0.
- Africa Cup of Nations qualification, matchday 1:
  - Group A: Mali 2–1 Liberia
    - Standings: Cape Verde 3 points (1 match), Mali 3 (2), Zimbabwe 1 (1), Liberia 1 (2).
  - Group C: Comoros 0–1 Mozambique
    - Standings: Mozambique 4 points (2 matches), Zambia 3 (1), Libya 1 (1), Comoros 0 (2).
  - Group D: Tanzania 0–1 Morocco
    - Standings: Morocco 4 points (2 matches), Algeria, Central African Republic 1 (1), Tanzania 1 (2).
  - Group E:
    - Cameroon 1–1 DR Congo
    - Senegal 7–0 Mauritius
      - Standings (after 2 matches): Senegal 6 points, Cameroon 4, Congo DR 1, Mauritius 0.
  - Group F: Burkina Faso 3–1 Gambia
    - Standings: Burkina Faso 3 points (1 match), Gambia 3 (2), Namibia 0 (1).
  - Group H:
    - Burundi 0–1 Ivory Coast
    - Rwanda 0–3 Benin
      - Standings (after 2 matches): Côte d'Ivoire 6 points, Benin 4, Burundi 1, Rwanda 0.
  - Group J:
    - Kenya 0–0 Uganda
    - Angola 1–0 Guinea-Bissau
      - Standings (after 2 matches): Uganda 4 points, Guinea-Bissau, Angola 3, Kenya 1.
  - Group K: Malawi 6–2 Chad
    - Standings: Botswana 10 points (4 matches), Malawi 6 (4), Tunisia 4 (3), Togo 2 (3), Chad 1 (4).
- 2011 UEFA European Under-21 Championship qualification play-offs, first leg:
  - Netherlands 1–3 Ukraine
  - Spain 2–1 Croatia
- Copa Libertadores de Fútbol Femenino in Barueri, São Paulo, Brazil: (teams in **bold** advance to the semifinals)
  - Group A:
    - **Santos** (Brazil) 4–0 (Colombia) Formas Íntimas
    - **Deportivo Quito** (Ecuador) 1–0 (Venezuela) Caracas
      - Standings: Santos 9 points (3 matches), Deportivo Quito 7 (3), Formas Íntimas 3 (3), Caracas 3 (4), (Uruguay) River Plate 1 (3).

==== Golf ====
- Constellation Energy Senior Players Championship in Potomac, Maryland, United States:
  - Leaderboard after day 3 (all USA): (1) Mark O'Meara 205 (−5) (T2) Michael Allen, Russ Cochran & Loren Roberts 207 (−3)

==== Multi-sport events ====
- Commonwealth Games in Delhi, India:
  - Aquatics (swimming):
    - Men's:
      - 50m freestyle: (gold) Brent Hayden (CAN) 22.01 (GR) (silver) Roland Mark Schoeman (RSA) 22.14 (bronze) Gideon Louw (RSA) 22.22
      - 200m breaststroke: (gold) Brenton Rickard (AUS) 2:10.89 (GR) (silver) Michael Jamieson (SCO) 2:10.97 (bronze) Christian Sprenger (AUS) 2:11.44
      - 100m freestyle S10: (gold) Benoît Huot (CAN) 53.70 (GR) (silver) Andrew Pasterfield (AUS) 55.04 (bronze) Robert Welbourn (ENG) 55.10
      - 1500m freestyle: (gold) Ryan Cochrane (CAN) 15:01.49 (silver) Heerden Herman (RSA) 15:03.70 (bronze) Daniel Fogg (ENG) 15:13.50
      - 4 × 100 m medley relay: (gold) Australia (Ashley Delaney, Brenton Rickard, Geoff Huegill, Eamon Sullivan) 3:33.15 (GR) (silver) South Africa 3:36.12 (bronze) England 3:36.31
    - Women's:
      - 200m butterfly: (gold) Jessicah Schipper (AUS) 2:07.04 (silver) Audrey Lacroix (CAN) 2:07.31 (bronze) Ellen Gandy (ENG) 2:07.75
      - 100m butterfly S9: (gold) Natalie du Toit (RSA) 1:07.32 (silver) Stephanie Millward (ENG) 1:13.11 (bronze) Ellie Cole (AUS) 1:14.04
      - 400m individual medley: (gold) Hannah Miley (SCO) 4:38.83 (GR) (silver) Samantha Hamill (AUS) 4:39.45 (bronze) Keri-anne Payne (ENG) 4:41.07
      - 4 × 100 m medley relay: (gold) Australia (Emily Seebohm, Leisel Jones, Jessicah Schipper, Alicia Coutts) 3:56.99 (silver) England 4:00.09 (bronze) Canada 4:03.96
  - Archery:
    - Women's compound individual: (gold) Nicky Hunt (ENG) (silver) Doris Jones (CAN) (bronze) Cassie McCall (AUS)
    - Men's compound individual: (gold) Duncan Busby (ENG) (silver) Christopher White (ENG) (bronze) Septimus Cilliers (RSA)
  - Athletics:
    - Men's:
      - 20km walk: (gold) Jared Tallent (AUS) 1:22:18 (GR) (silver) Luke Adams (AUS) 1:22:31 (bronze) Harminder Singh (IND) 1:23:28
      - High jump: (gold) Donald Thomas (BAH) 2.32m (silver) Trevor Barry (BAH) 2.29m (bronze) Kabelo Kgosiemang (BOT) 2.26m
      - Long jump: (gold) Fabrice Lapierre (AUS) 8.30m (silver) Greg Rutherford (ENG) 8.22m (bronze) Ignisious Gaisah (GHA) 8.12m
      - 400m: (gold) Mark Mutai (KEN) 45.44 (silver) Sean Wroe (AUS) 45.46 (bronze) Ramon Miller (BAH) 45.55
    - Women's:
      - 20km walk: (gold) Johanna Jackson (ENG) 1:34:22 (GR) (silver) Claire Tallent (AUS) 1:36:55 (bronze) Grace Wanjiru (KEN) 1:37:49
      - Shot put: (gold) Valerie Adams (NZL) 20.47m (GR) (silver) Cleopatra Brown (TRI) 19.03m (bronze) Tasele Satupai (SAM) 16.43m
      - 3000m steeplechase: (gold) Milcah Chemos Cheywa (KEN) 9:40.96 (silver) Mercy Wanjiku (KEN) 9:41.54 (bronze) Gladys Kipkemoi (KEN) 9:52.51
      - Javelin throw: (gold) Sunette Viljoen (RSA) 62.34m (GR) (silver) Kimberley Mickle (AUS) 60.90m (bronze) Justine Robbeson (RSA) 60.03m
      - Heptathlon: (gold) Louise Hazel (ENG) 6156 points (silver) Jessica Zelinka (CAN) 6100 (bronze) Grace Clements (ENG) 5819
  - Shooting:
    - Men's:
      - 25m centrefire pistol pairs: (gold) India (Vijay Kumar, Harpreet Singh) 1159 points (silver) New Zealand 1140 (bronze) Singapore 1139
      - 50m rifle 3 positions singles: (gold) Gagan Narang (IND) 1262.2 points (GR, FGR) (silver) Jonathan Hammond (SCO) 1255.3 (bronze) James Huckle (ENG) 1254.9
    - Women's:
      - 10m air rifle pairs: (gold) Malaysia (Nur Suryani Mohamed Taibi, Nur Ayuni Halim) 793 points (silver) Singapore 790 (bronze) India 785
      - Trap singles: (gold) Anita North (ENG) 93 points (FGR) (silver) Shona Marshall (SCO) 91 (bronze) Gaby Ahrens (NAM) 88
  - Table tennis:
    - Men's team event: (gold) Singapore (Gao Ning, Yang Zi, Ma Liang) (silver) England (bronze) India
  - Tennis:
    - Women's singles: (gold) Anastasia Rodionova (AUS) (silver) Sania Mirza (IND) (bronze) Sally Peers (AUS)
    - Men's doubles: (gold) Paul Hanley/Peter Luczak (AUS) (silver) Ross Hutchins/Ken Skupski (ENG) (bronze) Mahesh Bhupathi/Leander Paes (IND)
  - Weightlifting:
    - Men's 94 kg: (gold) Faavae Faauliuli (SAM) 334 kg (silver) Peter Kirkbride (SCO) 333 kg (bronze) Benedict Uloko (NGA) 332 kg
    - Women's 75 kg: (gold) Hadiza Zakari (NGA) 239 kg (GR) (silver) Marie-Eve Beauchemin-Nadeau (CAN) 225 kg (bronze) Laishram Devi (IND) 216 kg
  - Wrestling:
    - Men's freestyle 60 kg: (gold) Yogeshwar Dutt (IND) (silver) James Mancini (CAN) (bronze) Sasha Madyarchyk (ENG)
    - Men's freestyle 74 kg: (gold) Narsingh Yadav (IND) (silver) Richard Addinall (RSA) (bronze) Evan Macdonald (CAN)
    - Men's freestyle 96 kg: (gold) Sinvie Boltic (NGA) (silver) Korey Jarvis (CAN) (bronze) Leon Rattigan (ENG)

==== Rugby union ====
- Heineken Cup pool stage, matchday 1:
  - Pool 1: Cardiff Blues (Wales) 18–17 (Scotland) Edinburgh
  - Pool 2:
    - Leinster (Ireland) 38–22 (France) Racing Métro
    - Clermont (France) 25–10 (England) Saracens
  - Pool 3:
    - Toulon (France) 19–14 (Wales) Ospreys
    - London Irish (England) 23–17 (Ireland) Munster
  - Pool 5:
    - Benetton Treviso (Italy) 29–34 (England) Leicester Tigers
    - Scarlets (Wales) 43–34 (France) Perpignan
- Amlin Challenge Cup pool stage, matchday 1:

==== Volleyball ====
- Men's World Championship in Italy:
  - Semifinals in Rome:
    - Serbia 2–3 **Cuba**
      - Cuba reach the final for the first time since 1990.
    - Italy 1–3 **Brazil**
      - Two-time defending champion Brazil reach the final for the third straight time.
  - 11th place in Florence: Spain 1–3 **France**
  - 9th place in Florence: **Argentina** 3–1 Czech Republic
  - 7th place in Modena: **Bulgaria** 3–0 Germany
  - 5th place in Modena: **Russia** 3–0 United States

=== October 8, 2010 (Friday) ===
==== Baseball ====
- Major League Baseball postseason:
  - National League Division Series:
    - Game 2, Philadelphia Phillies 7, Cincinnati Reds 4. Phillies lead series 2–0.
    - Game 2, Atlanta Braves 5, San Francisco Giants 4 (11 innings). Series tied 1–1.

==== Cricket ====
- New Zealand in Bangladesh:
  - 2nd ODI in Mirpur: Bangladesh vs. New Zealand. **Match abandoned without a ball bowled; Bangladesh lead 5-match series 1–0.**
- Zimbabwe in South Africa:
  - 1st T20I in Bloemfontein: Zimbabwe 168/4 (20 overs); South Africa 169/3 (15.5 overs). **South Africa win by 7 wickets; lead 2-match series 1–0.**

==== Equestrianism ====
- FEI World Games in Lexington, Kentucky, United States:
  - Driving Dressage: (gold) (silver) (bronze)
  - Jumping Individual Combination: (gold) (silver) (bronze)
  - Para Dressage Individual Championship Tests: (gold) (silver) (bronze)
  - Vaulting Compulsory-Individual Female/Male: (gold) (silver) (bronze)

==== Figure skating ====
- ISU Junior Grand Prix in Dresden, Germany: (skaters in **bold** qualify for ISU Junior Grand Prix Final)
  - Ice Dance short dance: (1) Evgenia Kosigina / Nikolai Moroshkin (RUS) 54.32 (2) Marina Antipova / Artem Kudashev (RUS) 49.42 (3) Charlotte Lichtman / Dean Copely (USA) 48.51
  - Pairs: (gold) **Sui Wenjing / Han Cong** (CHN) 167.13 (silver) **Narumi Takahashi / Mervin Tran** (JPN) 159.38 (bronze) Anna Silaeva / Artur Minchuk (RUS) 131.03
    - Standings (after 3 of 4 events): **Ksenia Stolbova / Fedor Klimov** (RUS) 30 points (2 events), Sui / Han 28 (2), Takahashi / Tran 26 (2), Brittany Jones / Kurtis Gaskell (CAN), Tatiana Danilova / Andrei Novoselov (RUS) 14 (2), Yu Xiaoyu / Jin Yang (CHN), Silaeva / Minchuk, Natasha Purich / Raymond Schultz (CAN) 11 (1)... Taylor Steele / Robert Schultz (CAN) 9 (1).
  - Ladies: (gold) **Elizaveta Tuktamysheva** (RUS) 172.78 (silver) **Christina Gao** (USA) 155.67 (bronze) Ira Vannut (BEL) 141.87
    - Standings (after 6 of 7 events): **Adelina Sotnikova** (RUS), Tuktamysheva 30 points (2 events), Gao, **Yasmin Siraj** (USA) 26 (2), Kristiene Gong (USA) 22 (2), Vannut 20 (2), Shion Kokubun (JPN) 18 (2), Rosa Sheveleva (RUS) 16 (2), Polina Shelepen (RUS), Risa Shoji (JPN) 15 (1)... Kiri Baga (USA) 13 (1).

==== Football (soccer) ====
- UEFA Euro 2012 qualifying, matchday 3:
  - Group A:
    - Kazakhstan 0–2 Belgium
    - Austria 3–0 Azerbaijan
    - Germany 3–0 Turkey
      - Standings: Germany 9 points (3 matches), Austria 6 (2), Turkey 6 (3), Belgium 3 (3), Kazakhstan 0 (3), Azerbaijan 0 (2).
  - Group B:
    - Armenia 3–1 Slovakia
    - Andorra 0–2 North Macedonia
    - Republic of Ireland 2–3 Russia
      - Standings (after 3 matches): Slovakia, Russia, Republic of Ireland 6 points, Armenia, Macedonia 4, Andorra 0.
  - Group C:
    - Serbia 1–3 Estonia
    - Northern Ireland 0–0 Italy
    - Slovenia 5–1 Faroe Islands
      - Standings: Italy 7 points (3 matches), Estonia 6 (3), Northern Ireland 4 (2), Serbia, Slovenia 4 (3), Faroe Islands 0 (4).
  - Group D:
    - Luxembourg 0–0 Belarus
    - Albania 1–1 Bosnia and Herzegovina
      - Standings: Albania, Belarus 5 points (3 matches), Bosnia and Herzegovina 4 (3), France 3 (2), Romania 2 (2), Luxembourg 1 (3).
  - Group E:
    - Hungary 8–0 San Marino
    - Moldova 0–1 Netherlands
      - Standings: Netherlands 9 points (3 matches), Sweden 6 (2), Hungary 6 (3), Moldova 3 (3), Finland 0 (2), San Marino 0 (3).
  - Group F:
    - Georgia 1–0 Malta
    - Greece 1–0 Latvia
      - Standings: Georgia, Greece 5 points (3 matches), Croatia, Israel 4 (2), Latvia 3 (3), Malta 0 (3).
  - Group G:
    - Montenegro 1–0 Switzerland
    - Wales 0–1 Bulgaria
      - Standings: Montenegro 9 points (3 matches), England 6 (2), Bulgaria 3 (3), Wales, Switzerland 0 (2).
  - Group H:
    - Cyprus 1–2 Norway
    - Portugal 3–1 Denmark
      - Standings: Norway 9 points (3 matches), Portugal 4 (3), Denmark 3 (2), Cyprus 1 (2), Iceland 0 (2).
  - Group I:
    - Czech Republic 1–0 Scotland
    - Spain 3–1 Lithuania
      - Standings: Spain 6 points (2 matches), Scotland, Lithuania 4 (3), Czech Republic 3 (2), Liechtenstein 0 (2).
- OFC Women's Championship in Auckland, New Zealand:
  - Third place playoff: Solomon Islands 0–2 (bronze) **Cook Islands**
  - Final: (gold) **New Zealand** 11–0 (silver) Papua New Guinea
    - New Zealand win the title for the fourth time, and qualify for 2011 FIFA Women's World Cup.
- 2011 UEFA European Under-21 Championship qualification play-offs, first leg:
  - England 2–1 Romania
  - Czech Republic 3–0 Greece
  - Italy 2–0 Belarus
- Caribbean Championship Qualifying Group Stage One:
  - Group B in Kingstown, Saint Vincent and the Grenadines:
    - Montserrat 0–5 Barbados
    - Saint Vincent 1–1 Saint Kitts and Nevis
      - Standings (after 2 matches): Saint Vincent, Barbados 4 points, Saint Kitts and Nevis 2, Montserrat 0.
- Copa Libertadores de Fútbol Femenino in Barueri, São Paulo, Brazil:
  - Group B:
    - Boca Juniors (Argentina) 12–1 (Peru) UP de Iquitos
    - Universidad Autónoma (Paraguay) 6–1 (Bolivia) Florida
      - Standings: Boca Juniors, (Chile) Everton 6 points (2 matches), Universidad Autónoma 3 (2), Florida 3 (3), UP de Iquitos 0 (3).

==== Golf ====
- Constellation Energy Senior Players Championship in Potomac, Maryland, United States:
  - Leaderboard after day 2 (all USA): (1) Russ Cochran 134 (−6) (2) Michael Allen 135 (−5) (3) Mark O'Meara 136 (−4)

==== Multi-sport events ====
- Commonwealth Games in Delhi, India:
  - Aquatics (swimming):
    - Men's:
      - 100m butterfly: (gold) Geoff Huegill (AUS) 51.69 (GR) (silver) Ryan Pini (PNG) 52.50 (silver) Antony James (ENG) 52.50
      - 50m breaststroke: (gold) Cameron van der Burgh (RSA) 27.18 (GR) (silver) Glenn Snyders (NZL) 27.67 (silver) Brenton Rickard (AUS) 27.67
      - 100m backstroke: (gold) Liam Tancock (ENG) 53.59 (GR) (silver) Daniel Bell (NZL) 54.43 (bronze) Ashley Delaney (AUS) 54.51
      - 100m freestyle S8: (gold) Ben Austin (AUS) 1:00.44 (silver) Sean Fraser (SCO) 1:00.77 (bronze) Blake Cochrane (AUS) 1:00.95
      - 200m individual medley: (gold) James Goddard (ENG) 1:58.10 (GR) (silver) Joe Roebuck (ENG) 1:59.86 (bronze) Leith Brodie (AUS) 2:00.00
    - Women's:
      - 50m freestyle: (gold) Yolane Kukla (AUS) 24.86 (silver) Francesca Halsall (ENG) 24.98 (bronze) Hayley Palmer (NZL) 25.01
      - 200m backstroke: (gold) Meagen Nay (AUS) 2:07.56 (GR) (silver) Elizabeth Simmonds (ENG) 2:07.90 (bronze) Emily Seebohm (AUS) 2:08.28
      - 100m breaststroke: (gold) Leisel Jones (AUS) 1:05.84 (silver) Samantha Marshall (AUS) 1:07.97 (bronze) Kate Haywood (ENG) 1:08.29
      - 400m freestyle: (gold) Rebecca Adlington (ENG) 4:05.68 (GR) (silver) Kylie Palmer (AUS) 4:07.85 (bronze) Jazmin Carlin (WAL) 4:08.22
      - 50m backstroke: (gold) Sophie Edington (AUS) 28.00 (GR) (silver) Gemma Spofforth (ENG) 28.03 (bronze) Georgia Davies (WAL) 28.33 (bronze) Emily Seebohm (AUS) 28.33
      - 4 × 100 m freestyle relay: (gold) Australia (Alicia Coutts, Felicity Galvez, Marieke Guehrer, Emily Seebohm) 3:36.36 (GR) (silver) England 3:40.03 (bronze) New Zealand 3:42.12
  - Archery:
    - Women's recurve team: (gold) India (Dola Banerjee, Deepika Kumari, Bombayala Laishram) 207 points (silver) England 206 (bronze) Canada 202
    - Men's recurve team: (gold) Australia (Matthew Gray, Mat Masonwells, Taylor Worth) 219 points (silver) Malaysia 212 (bronze) India 221
  - Athletics:
    - Men's:
      - 110m hurdles: (gold) Andy Turner (ENG) 13.38 (silver) William Sharman (ENG) 13.50 (bronze) Lawrence Clarke (ENG) 13.70
      - Hammer throw: (gold) Chris Harmse (RSA) 73.15m (silver) Alex Smith (ENG) 72.95m (bronze) Mike Floyd (ENG) 69.34m
      - Decathlon: (gold) Jamie Adjetey-Nelson (CAN) 8070 points (silver) Brent Newdick (NZL) 7899 (bronze) Martin Brockman (ENG) 7712
    - Women's:
      - 1500m T54: (gold) Diane Roy (CAN) 3:53.95 (silver) Chineme Obeta (NGA) 4:09.29 (bronze) Anita Fordjour (GHA) 4:18.83
      - Triple jump: (gold) Trecia-Kaye Smith (JAM) 14.19m (silver) Ayanna Alexander (TRI) 13.91m (bronze) Tabia Charles (CAN) 13.84m
      - 400m: (gold) Amantle Montsho (BOT) 50.10 (GR) (silver) Aliann Pompey (GUY) 51.65 (bronze) Christine Amertil (BAH) 51.96
      - 1500m: (gold) Nancy Langat (KEN) 4:05.26 (GR) (silver) Nikki Hamblin (NZL) 4:05.97 (bronze) Stephanie Twell (SCO) 4:06.15
      - 10,000m: (gold) Grace Momanyi (KEN) 32:34.11 (silver) Doris Changeywo (KEN) 32:36.97 (bronze) Kavita Raut (IND) 33:05.28
  - Badminton:
    - Mixed team: (gold) Malaysia (Koo Kien Keat, Chin Ee Hui, Lee Chong Wei, Wong Mew Choo, Boon Heong Tan) (silver) India (bronze) England
  - Cycling (track):
    - Women's individual pursuit: (gold) Alison Shanks (NZL) 3:30.875 (silver) Wendy Houvenaghel (NIR) 3:32.137 (bronze) Tara Whitten (CAN) 3:35.810
    - Men's team sprint: (gold) Australia (Dan Ellis, Jason Niblett, Scott Sunderland) 43.772 (GR) (silver) New Zealand 44.239 (bronze) Malaysia 45.040
    - Men's scratch: (gold) Cameron Meyer (AUS) (silver) Michael Freiberg (AUS) (bronze) Zachary Bell (CAN)
  - Gymnastics (artistic):
    - Men's:
      - Vault: (gold) Luke Folwell (ENG) 15.762 points (silver) Ashish Kumar (IND) 15.312 (bronze) Ian Galvan (CAN) 15.037
      - Parallel bars: (gold) Joshua Jefferis (AUS) 14.625 points (silver) Luke Folwell (ENG) 14.200 (bronze) Prashanth Sellathurai (AUS) 14.000
      - Horizontal bar: (gold) Dimitris Krasias (CYP) 13.900 points (silver) Anderson Loran (CAN) 13.625 (bronze) Max Whitlock (ENG) 13.575
    - Women's:
      - Balance beam: (gold) Lauren Mitchell (AUS) 14.475 points (silver) Heem Wei Lim (SIN) 12.825 (bronze) Cynthia Lemieux-Guillemette (CAN) 12.825
      - Floor exercise: (gold) Imogen Cairns (ENG) 14.200 points (silver) Lauren Mitchell (AUS) 13.925 (bronze) Ashleigh Brennan (AUS) 13.425
  - Shooting:
    - Men's trap pairs: (gold) Australia (Michael Diamond, Adam Vella) 198 points (GR) (silver) India (bronze) England
    - Women's trap pairs: (gold) Australia (Laetisha Scanlan, Stacy Roiall) 93 points (GR) (silver) England 91 (bronze) Canada 90
    - Men's 50m rifle 3 positions pairs: (gold) India (Gagan Narang, Imran Hassan Khan) 2325 points (GR) (silver) England 2308+105 (bronze) Scotland 2308+104
    - Men's 25m rapid fire pistol singles: (gold) Vijay Kumar (IND) 787.5 points (GR, FGR) (silver) Hasli Amir Hasan (MYS) 760.3 (bronze) Gurpreet Singh (IND) 758.7
    - Men's 10m air pistol singles: (gold) Omkar Singh (IND) 681.8 points (silver) Bin Gai (SIN) 676.2 (bronze) Daniel Repacholi (AUS) 674
  - Squash:
    - Women's singles: (gold) Nicol David (MYS) (silver) Jenny Duncalf (ENG) (bronze) Kasey Brown (AUS)
    - Men's singles: (gold) Nick Matthew (ENG) (silver) James Willstrop (ENG) (bronze) Peter Barker (ENG)
  - Table tennis:
    - Women's team event: (gold) Singapore (Feng Tianwei, Wang Yuegu, Li Jiawei) (silver) India (bronze) Malaysia
  - Weightlifting:
    - Women's 69 kg: (gold) Christine Girard (CAN) 235 kg (GR) (silver) Marie Janet Georges (SEY) 216 kg (bronze) Itohan Ebireguesele (NGA) 215 kg
    - Men's 85 kg: (gold) Simplice Ribouem (AUS) 333 kg (silver) Richard Patterson (NZL) 331 kg (bronze) Mathieu Marineau (CAN) 325 kg
  - Wrestling:
    - Women's freestyle 51 kg: (gold) Ifeoma Nwoye (NGA) (silver) Babita Kumari (IND) (bronze) Jessica Macdonald (CAN)
    - Women's freestyle 59 kg: (gold) Alka Tomar (IND) (silver) Tonya Verbeek (CAN) (bronze) Tega Richard (NGA)
    - Women's freestyle 67 kg: (gold) Anita (IND) (silver) Megan Buydens (CAN) (bronze) Ifeoma Iheanacho (NGA)

==== Rugby union ====
- Heineken Cup pool stage, matchday 1:
  - Pool 1: Northampton Saints (England) 18–14 (France) Castres
  - Pool 4: Ulster (Ireland) 30–6 (Italy) Aironi
  - Pool 6: Glasgow Warriors (Scotland) 21–13 (Wales) Newport Gwent Dragons
- Amlin Challenge Cup pool stage, matchday 1:

==== Volleyball ====
- Men's World Championship in Italy:
  - 9th–12th places in Florence:
    - **Argentina** 3–1 Spain
    - France 0–3 **Czech Republic**
  - 5th–8th places in Modena:
    - **Russia** 3–1 Bulgaria
    - **United States** 3–0 Germany

=== October 7, 2010 (Thursday) ===
==== American football ====
- NCAA AP Top 10:
  - (7) Nebraska 48, Kansas State 13

==== Baseball ====
- Major League Baseball postseason:
  - American League Division Series:
    - Game 2, Texas Rangers 6, Tampa Bay Rays 0. Rangers lead series 2–0.
    - Game 2, New York Yankees 5, Minnesota Twins 2. Yankees lead series 2–0.
  - National League Division Series:
    - Game 1, San Francisco Giants 1, Atlanta Braves 0. Giants lead series 1–0.

==== Cricket ====
- Afghanistan in Kenya:
  - 1st ODI in Nairobi: Kenya 180 (46.2 overs); Afghanistan 88 (27.5 overs). **Kenya win by 92 runs; lead 3-match series 1–0.**

==== Figure skating ====
- ISU Junior Grand Prix in Dresden, Germany:
  - Ladies short program: (1) Elizaveta Tuktamysheva (RUS) 57.35 (2) Christina Gao (USA) 47.66 (3) Polina Agafonova (RUS) 47.20
  - Pairs short program: (1) Narumi Takahashi / Mervin Tran (JPN) 56.43 (2) Sui Wenjing / Han Cong (CHN) 55.32 (3) Anna Silaeva / Artur Minchuk (RUS) 48.30
  - Men's short program: (1) Richard Dornbush (USA) 69.05 (2) Gordei Gorshkov (RUS) 62.95 (3) Jorik Hendrickx (BEL) 60.81

==== Football (soccer) ====
- 2011 FIFA Women's World Cup qualification (UEFA):
  - Repechage I, second leg: (first leg score in parentheses)
    - **Switzerland** 0–0 (3–1) Denmark. Switzerland win 3–1 on aggregate and advance to Repechage II.
- 2011 UEFA European Under-21 Championship qualification play-offs, first leg:
  - Switzerland 4–1 Sweden
  - Iceland 2–1 Scotland
- Copa Libertadores de Fútbol Femenino in Barueri, São Paulo, Brazil:
  - Group A:
    - River Plate (Uruguay) 1–4 (Venezuela) Caracas
    - Formas Íntimas (Colombia) 0–1 (Ecuador) Deportivo Quito
      - Standings: (Brazil) Santos 6 points (2 matches), Deportivo Quito 4 (2), Formas Íntimas 3 (2), Caracas 3 (3), River Plate 1 (3).

==== Golf ====
- Constellation Energy Senior Players Championship in Potomac, Maryland, United States: (USA unless stated)
  - Leaderboard after day 1: (1) Tom Kite 67 (−3) (T2) Michael Allen, Mark O'Meara and Joe Ozaki (JPN) 68 (−2)

==== Multi-sport events ====
- Commonwealth Games in Delhi, India:
  - Aquatics (swimming):
    - Men's:
      - 100m freestyle: (gold) Brent Hayden (CAN) 47.98 (GR) (silver) Simon Burnett (ENG) 48.54 (bronze) Eamon Sullivan (AUS) 48.69
      - 400m individual medley: (gold) Chad le Clos (RSA) 4:13.25 (GR) (silver) Joe Roebuck (ENG) 4:15.84 (bronze) Riaan Schoeman (RSA) 4:16.86
    - Women's:
      - 100m butterfly: (gold) Alicia Coutts (AUS) 57.53 (silver) Ellen Gandy (ENG) 58.06 (bronze) Jemma Lowe (WAL) 58.42
      - 100m freestyle S9: (gold) Natalie du Toit (RSA) 1:02.36 (GR) (silver) Stephanie Millward (ENG) 1:03.69 (bronze) Ellie Cole (AUS) 1:05.20
      - 800m freestyle: (gold) Rebecca Adlington (ENG) 8:24.69 (silver) Wendy Trott (RSA) 8:26.69 (bronze) Melissa Gorman (AUS) 8:32.37
  - Archery:
    - Women's compound team: (gold) England (Danielle Brown, Nicky Hunt, Nichola Simpson) 232 points (silver) Canada 229 (bronze) India 223
    - Men's compound team: (gold) England (Duncan Busby, Liam Grimwood, Christopher White) 231 points (silver) India 229 (bronze) South Africa 234
  - Athletics:
    - Men's:
      - Shot put (seated): (gold) Kyle Pettey (CAN) 1021 points (WR) (silver) Dan West (ENG) 969 (bronze) Hamish MacDonald (AUS) 889
      - 100m T46: (gold) Simon Patmore (AUS) 11.14 (silver) Samkelo Radebe (RSA) 11.25 (bronze) Ayuba Abdullahi (NGA) 11.37
      - Shot put: (gold) Dylan Armstrong (CAN) 21.02m (GR) (silver) Dorian Scott (JAM) 20.19m (bronze) Dale Stevenson (AUS) 19.99m
      - 100m: (gold) Lerone Clarke (JAM) 10.12 (silver) Mark Lewis-Francis (ENG) 10.20 (bronze) Aaron Armstrong (TRI) 10.24
    - Women's:
      - Hammer throw: (gold) Sultana Frizell (CAN) 68.57m (GR) (silver) Carys Parry (WAL) 64.93m (bronze) Zoe Derham (ENG) 64.04m
      - 100m T37: (gold) Katrina Hart (ENG) 14.36 (silver) Jenny McLoughlin (WAL) 14.68 (bronze) Johanna Benson (NAM) 14.81
      - 100m: (gold) Natasha Mayers (VCT) 11.37 (silver) Katherine Endacott (ENG) 11.44 (bronze) Delphine Atangana (CMR) 11.48
        - The race was originally won by Sally Pearson (AUS) but she was disqualified along with Laura Turner (ENG) for making false starts. Oludamola Osayomi (NGA) inherited the gold but she was also stripped of the medal for testing positive for the banned stimulant, methylhexanamine. (BBC Sport)
  - Cycling (track):
    - Men's:
      - Sprint: (gold) Shane Perkins (AUS) (silver) Scott Sunderland (AUS) (bronze) Sam Webster (NZL)
      - Team pursuit: (gold) Australia (Jack Bobridge, Michael Hepburn, Cameron Meyer, Dale Parker) 3:55.421 (GR) (silver) New Zealand (bronze) Northern Ireland
    - Women's:
      - Scratch: (gold) Megan Dunn (AUS) (silver) Joanne Kiesanowski (NZL) (bronze) Anna Blyth (ENG)
      - Sprint: (gold) Anna Meares (AUS) (silver) Becky James (WAL) (bronze) Emily Rosemond (AUS)
  - Gymnastics (artistic):
    - Men's:
      - Floor exercise: (gold) Thomas Pichler (AUS) 14.675 points (silver) Reiss Beckford (ENG) 14.625 (bronze) Ashish Kumar (IND) 14.475
      - Pommel horse: (gold) Prashanth Sellathurai (AUS) 15.500 points (silver) Max Whitlock (ENG) 15.125 (bronze) David-Jonathan Chan (SIN) 14.200
      - Rings: (gold) Samuel Offord (AUS) 14.825 points (silver) Luke Folwell (ENG) 14.750 (bronze) Herodotos Giorgallas (CYP) 14.650
    - Women's:
      - Vault: (gold) Imogen Cairns (ENG) 13.775 points (silver) Jennifer Khwela (RSA) 13.737 (bronze) Gabby May (CAN) 13.712
      - Uneven bars: (gold) Lauren Mitchell (AUS) 14.150 points (silver) Georgia Bonora (AUS) 13.925 (bronze) Cynthia Lemieux-Guillemette (CAN) 13.350
  - Shooting:
    - Men's 10m air pistol pairs: (gold) India (Omkar Singh, Gurpreet Singh) 1163 points (GR) (silver) England 1143 (bronze) Singapore 1139
    - Men's 25m rapid fire pistol pairs: (gold) India (Vijay Kumar, Gurpreet Singh) 1162 points (GR) (silver) Malaysia 1144 (bronze) Australia 1125
    - Women's 50m rifle 3 positions singles: (gold) Alethea Sedgman (AUS) 676.0 points (silver) Jasmine Ser (SIN) 672.6 (bronze) Aqilah Sudhir (SIN) 671.3
    - Men's double trap singles: (gold) Stevan Walton (ENG) 190 points (silver) Ronjan Sodhi (IND) 186+8 (bronze) Tim Kneale (IMN) 186+7+6
  - Synchronised swimming:
    - Women's solo: (gold) Marie-Pier Boudreau Gagnon (CAN) 47.667 points (silver) Jenna Randall (ENG) 45.417 (bronze) Lauren Smith (SCO) 40.167
    - Women's duet: (gold) Canada (Chloé Isaac, Marie-Pier Boudreau Gagnon) 47.667 points (silver) England 45.084 (bronze) Australia 39.750
  - Weightlifting:
    - Men's 77 kg: (gold) Yukio Peter (NRU) 333 kg (GR) (silver) Ben Turner (AUS) 308 kg (bronze) Sudhir Kumar Chitradurga (IND) 297 kg
    - Women's 63 kg: (gold) Obioma Okoli (NGA) 211 kg (silver) Michaela Breeze (WAL) 202 kg (bronze) Marie Josephe Fegue (CMR) 198 kg
  - Wrestling:
    - Women's freestyle 48 kg: (gold) Carol Huynh (CAN) (silver) Nirmala Devi (IND) (bronze) Odunayo Adekuroye (NGA)
    - Women's freestyle 55 kg: (gold) Geeta Phogat (IND) (silver) Emily Bensted (AUS) (bronze) Lovina Edward (NGA)
    - Women's freestyle 63 kg: (gold) Justine Bouchard (CAN) (silver) Blessing Oborududu (NGA) (bronze) Suman Kundu (IND)
    - Women's freestyle 72 kg: (gold) Ohenewa Akuffo (CAN) (silver) Annabel Ali (CMR) (bronze) Hellen Okus (NGA)

==== Rugby union ====
- Amlin Challenge Cup pool stage, matchday 1:
  - Pool 3: Newcastle Falcons (England) 22–16 (France) Bourgoin

==== Snooker ====
- Premier League Snooker – League phase in Essex:
  - Mark Selby (ENG) 2–4 Ding Junhui (CHN)
  - Ronnie O'Sullivan (ENG) 3–3 Shaun Murphy (ENG)
    - Standings: Ding 4 points (4 matches), Murphy, O'Sullivan 3 (3), Marco Fu (HKG), Mark Williams (WAL) 3 (2), Selby 2 (3), Neil Robertson (AUS) 0 (1).

=== October 6, 2010 (Wednesday) ===
==== Baseball ====
- Major League Baseball postseason:
  - American League Division Series:
    - Game 1, Texas Rangers 5, Tampa Bay Rays 1. Rangers lead series 1–0.
    - Game 1, New York Yankees 6, Minnesota Twins 4. Yankees lead series 1–0.
  - National League Division Series:
    - Game 1, Philadelphia Phillies 4, Cincinnati Reds 0. Phillies lead series 1–0.
      - Phillies pitcher Roy Halladay throws the first postseason no-hitter since Don Larsen's perfect game in 1956, giving up a walk and striking out eight batters.

==== Equestrianism ====
- FEI World Games in Lexington, Kentucky, United States:
  - Jumping Team Final Combination: (gold) (silver) (bronze)
  - Vaulting Compulsory-Team: (gold) (silver) (bronze)

==== Football (soccer) ====
- 2011 FIFA Women's World Cup qualification (UEFA):
  - Repechage I, second leg: (first leg score in parentheses)
    - **Italy** 0–0 (3–0) Ukraine. Italy win 3–0 on aggregate and advance to Repechage II.
- OFC Women's Championship in Auckland, New Zealand:
  - Semi finals:
    - **New Zealand** 8–0 Solomon Islands
    - **Papua New Guinea** 1–0 Cook Islands
- Caribbean Championship Qualifying Group Stage One: (teams in **bold** advance to the Qualifying Group Stage Two)
  - Group A in Bayamón, Puerto Rico:
    - Anguilla 2–1 Saint Martin
    - **Puerto Rico** 2–0 Cayman Islands
      - Final standings: Puerto Rico 9 points, Cayman Islands 4, Anguilla 3, Saint-Martin 1.
  - Group B in Kingstown, Saint Vincent and the Grenadines:
    - Barbados 1–1 Saint Kitts and Nevis
    - Saint Vincent 7–0 Montserrat
- AFC Champions League Semi-finals, first leg:
  - Zob Ahan (Iran) 1–0 (Saudi Arabia) Al-Hilal
- Copa Sudamericana Round of 16, first leg:
  - Newell's Old Boys (Argentina) 6–0 (Bolivia) San José
- Copa Libertadores de Fútbol Femenino in Barueri, São Paulo, Brazil:
  - Group B:
    - UP de Iquitos (Peru) 1–2 (Bolivia) Florida
    - Universidad Autónoma (Paraguay) 1–2 (Chile) Everton
      - Standings: Everton 6 points (2 matches), (Argentina) Boca Juniors 3 (1), Florida 3 (2), Universidad Autónoma 0 (1), UP de Iquitos 0 (2).

==== Golf ====
- World Golf Hall of Fame Class of 2011:
  - International: Masashi "Jumbo" Ozaki (JPN)

==== Multi-sport events ====
- Commonwealth Games in Delhi, India:
  - Aquatics (swimming):
    - Men's:
      - 200m backstroke: (gold) James Goddard (ENG) 1:55.58 (GR) (silver) Gareth Kean (NZL) 1:57.37 (bronze) Ashley Delaney (AUS) 1:58.18
      - 50m freestyle S9: (gold) Matthew Cowdrey (AUS) 25.33 (WR) (silver) Simon Miller (ENG) 26.70 (bronze) Prasanta Karmakar (IND) 27.48
      - 50m butterfly: (gold) Jason Dunford (KEN) 23.35 (silver) Geoff Huegill (AUS) 23.37 (bronze) Roland Mark Schoeman (RSA) 23.44
      - 100m breaststroke: (gold) Cameron van der Burgh (RSA) 1:00.10 (GR) (silver) Christian Sprenger (AUS) 1:00.29 (bronze) Brenton Rickard (AUS) 1:00.46
      - 4 × 200 m freestyle relay: (gold) Australia (Thomas Fraser-Holmes, Nic Ffrost, Ryan Napoleon, Kenrick Monk) 7:10.29 (GR) (silver) Scotland 7:14.02 (bronze) South Africa 7:14.18
    - Women's:
      - 100m freestyle: (gold) Alicia Coutts (AUS) 54.09 (silver) Emily Seebohm (AUS) 54.30 (bronze) Francesca Halsall (ENG) 54.57
      - 200m breaststroke: (gold) Leisel Jones (AUS) 2:25.38 (silver) Tessa Wallace (AUS) 2:25.60 (bronze) Sarah Katsoulis (AUS) 2:25.92
      - 100m backstroke: (gold) Emily Seebohm (AUS) 59.79 (GR) (silver) Gemma Spofforth (ENG) 1:00.02 (bronze) Julia Wilkinson (CAN) 1:00.74
      - 4 × 200 m freestyle relay: (gold) Australia (Kylie Palmer, Blair Evans, Bronte Barratt, Meagen Nay) 7:53.71 (GR) (silver) New Zealand 7:57.46 (bronze) England 7:58.61
  - Athletics:
    - Women's shot put (seated): (gold) Louise Ellery (AUS) 1110 points (silver) Jess Hamill (NZL) 979 (bronze) Gemma Prescott (ENG) 952
    - Men's 5000m: (gold) Moses Ndiema Kipsiro (UGA) 13:31.25 (silver) Eliud Kipchoge (KEN) 13:31.32 (bronze) Mark Kiptoo (KEN) 13:32.58
  - Cycling (track):
    - Men's:
      - Keirin: (gold) Josiah Ng (MYS) (silver) David Daniell (ENG) (bronze) Simon van Velthooven (NZL)
      - Points race: (gold) Cameron Meyer (AUS) 89 points (silver) George Atkins (ENG) 52 (bronze) Mark Christian (IMN) 37
    - Women's:
      - Points race: (gold) Megan Dunn (AUS) 45 points (silver) Lauren Ellis (NZL) 40 (bronze) Tara Whitten (CAN) 36
      - Team sprint: (gold) Australia (Anna Meares, Kaarle McCulloch) 33.811 (silver) Scotland 35.908 (bronze) Canada 37.094
  - Gymnastics (artistic):
    - Men's individual all-around: (gold) Luke Folwell (ENG) 85.550 points (silver) Reiss Beckford (ENG) 85.450 (bronze) Joshua Jefferis (AUS) 84.750
    - Women's individual all-around: (gold) Lauren Mitchell (AUS) 58.200 points (silver) Emily Little (AUS) 55.850 (bronze) Georgia Bonora (AUS) 54.950
  - Shooting:
    - Men's double trap pairs: (gold) England (Steven Scott, Stevan Walton) 189 points (GR) (silver) India 188 (bronze) Malaysia 185
    - Men's 10m air rifle singles: (gold) Gagan Narang (IND) 703.6 points (GR, FGR) (silver) Abhinav Bindra (IND) 698 (bronze) James Huckle (ENG) 693.5
    - Women's 25m pistol singles: (gold) Anisa Sayyed (IND) 786.8 points (FGR) (silver) Rahi Sarnobot (IND) 781 (bronze) Bibiana Ng Pei Chin (MYS) 778.2
    - Men's 50m pistol singles: (gold) Omkar Singh (IND) 653.6 points (silver) Bin Gai (SIN) 649.6 (bronze) Swee Hon Lim (SIN) 644.7
  - Weightlifting:
    - Women's 58 kg: (gold) Renu Yumnam (IND) 197 kg (silver) Seen Lee (AUS) 192 kg (bronze) Zoe Smith (ENG) 188 kg
    - Men's 69 kg: (gold) Ravi Katulu (IND) 321 kg (silver) Chinthana Vidanage (SRI) 308 kg (bronze) Mohd Mansor (MYS) 306 kg
  - Wrestling:
    - Men's Greco-Roman 55 kg: (gold) Rajender Kumar (IND) (silver) Azhar Hussain (PAK) (bronze) Promise Mwenga (CAN)
    - Men's Greco-Roman 66 kg: (gold) Myroslav Dykun (ENG) (silver) Jack Bond (CAN) (bronze) Sunil Kumar (IND)
    - Men's Greco-Roman 84 kg: (gold) Efionayi Agbonavbare (NGA) (silver) Manoj Kumar (IND) (bronze) Dean van Zyl (RSA)
    - Men's Greco-Roman 120 kg: (gold) Ivan Popov (AUS) (silver) Talaram Mamman (NGA) (bronze) Dharmender Dalal (IND)

==== Volleyball ====
- Men's World Championship in Italy: (teams in **bold** advance to the semifinals)
  - Pool O in Rome: **Italy** 3–1 France
    - Final standings: Italy 4 points, United States 3, France 2.
  - Pool P in Florence: Argentina 0–3 Russia
    - Final standings: **Serbia** 4 points, Russia 3, Argentina 2.
  - Pool Q in Florence: Bulgaria 2–3 **Cuba**
    - Final standings: Cuba 4 points, Bulgaria 3, Spain 2.
  - Pool R in Rome: **Brazil** 3–0 Germany
    - Final standings: Brazil 4 points, Germany 3, Czech Republic 2.

=== October 5, 2010 (Tuesday) ===
==== Cricket ====
- Australia in India:
  - 1st Test in Mohali, day 5: Australia 428 (151.4 overs) and 192 (60.5 overs); India 405 (108.1 overs) and 216/9 (58.4 overs). **India win by 1 wicket; lead 2-match series 1–0.**
- New Zealand in Bangladesh:
  - 1st ODI in Mirpur: Bangladesh 228 (49.3 overs); New Zealand 200/8 (37/37 overs). **Bangladesh win by 9 runs (D/L); lead 5-match series 1–0.**
- ICC Intercontinental Cup in Nairobi, day 4: (teams in **bold** advance to the final)
  - **Afghanistan** 464 (105 overs) and 207 (49.1 overs); Kenya 160 (39.5 overs) and 344 (90.5 overs; Hamid Hassan 6/87). **Afghanistan win by 167 runs.**
    - Final standings: Afghanistan 97 points, **Scotland** 89, Zimbabwe XI 72, Ireland 55, Kenya 43, Netherlands 15, Canada 9.

==== Football (soccer) ====
- AFC Champions League Semi-finals, first leg:
  - Al-Shabab (Saudi Arabia) 4–3 (South Korea) Seongnam Ilhwa Chunma
- AFC Cup Semi-finals, first leg:
  - Muangthong United (Thailand) 1–0 (Syria) Al-Ittihad
  - Al-Riffa (Bahrain) 2–0 (Kuwait) Al-Qadsia
- Copa Libertadores de Fútbol Femenino in Barueri, São Paulo, Brazil:
  - Group A:
    - Formas Íntimas (Colombia) 3–1 (Venezuela) Caracas
    - Santos (Brazil) 9–0 (Uruguay) River Plate
      - Standings: Santos 6 points (2 matches), Formas Íntimas 3 (1), (Ecuador) Deportivo Quito 1 (1), River Plate 1 (2), Caracas 0 (2).
- (United States) Lamar Hunt U.S. Open Cup Final in Seattle:
  - **Seattle Sounders FC** 2–1 Columbus Crew
    - Sanna Nyassi scores both Sounders goals to lead them to their second U.S. Open Cup in two years of existence.

==== Multi-sport events ====
- Commonwealth Games in Delhi, India:
  - Aquatics (swimming):
    - Men's:
      - 50m backstroke: (gold) Liam Tancock (ENG) 24.62 (GR) (silver) Hayden Stoeckel (AUS) 25.08 (bronze) Ashley Delaney (AUS) 25.21
      - 200m freestyle: (gold) Robert Renwick (SCO) 1:47.88 (silver) Kenrick Monk (AUS) 1:47.90 (bronze) Thomas Fraser-Holmes (AUS) 1:48.22
    - Women's:
      - 50m butterfly: (gold) Francesca Halsall (ENG) 26.24 (silver) Marieke Guehrer (AUS) 26.27 (bronze) Emily Seebohm (AUS) 26.29
      - 50m breaststroke: (gold) Leiston Pickett (AUS) 30.84 (silver) Leisel Jones (AUS) 31.10 (bronze) Kate Haywood (ENG) 31.17
      - 50m freestyle S9: (gold) Natalie du Toit (RSA) 29.17 (GR) (silver) Annabelle Williams (AUS) 29.42 (bronze) Stephanie Millward (ENG) 29.69
  - Cycling (track):
    - Women's 500m time trial: (gold) Anna Meares (AUS) 33.758 (GR) (silver) Kaarle McCulloch (AUS) 34.780 (bronze) Becky James (WAL) 35.236
    - Men's 1km time trial: (gold) Scott Sunderland (AUS) 1:01.411 (GR) (silver) Mohd Rizal Tisin (MYS) 1:02.768 (bronze) Edward Dawkins (NZL) 1:02.777
    - Men's individual pursuit: (gold) Jack Bobridge (AUS) 4:17.495 (silver) Jesse Sergent (NZL) 4:17.893 (bronze) Michael Hepburn (AUS) Overlap
  - Gymnastics (artistic):
    - Women's team competition: (gold) Australia (Georgia Bonora, Ashleigh Brennan, Emily Little, Lauren Mitchell, Georgia Wheeler) 163.700 points (silver) England 158.200 (bronze) Canada 154.750
  - Shooting:
    - Men's:
      - 50m pistol pairs: (gold) Singapore (Swee Hon Lim, Bin Gai) 1094 points (silver) India 1087 (bronze) Trinidad and Tobago 1081
      - 10m air rifle pairs: (gold) India (Gagan Narang, Abhinav Bindra) 1193 points (GR) (silver) England 1174 (bronze) Bangladesh 1173
    - Women's:
      - 25m pistol pairs: (gold) India (Rahi Sarnobot, Anisa Sayyed) 1156 points (GR) (silver) Australia 1146 (bronze) England 1122
      - 50m rifle 3 positions pairs: (gold) Singapore (Aqilah Sudhir, Xiang Wei Jasmine Ser) 1149 points (GR) (silver) India 1143 (bronze) Scotland 1142
  - Weightlifting:
    - Men's 62 kg: (gold) Aricco Jumitith (MYS) 276 kg (silver) Naharudin Mahayudin (MYS) 275 kg (bronze) Anton Kurukulasooriyage (SRI) 272 kg
    - Women's 53 kg: (gold) Marilou Dozois-Prévost (CAN) 182 kg (silver) Onyeka Azike (NGA) 180 kg (bronze) Raihan Yusoff (MYS) 175 kg
  - Wrestling:
    - Men's Greco-Roman 60 kg: (gold) Ravinder Singh (IND) (silver) Terence Bosson (ENG) (bronze) Romeo Joseph (NGA)
    - Men's Greco-Roman 74 kg: (gold) Sanjay Kumar (IND) (silver) Richard Addinall (RSA) (bronze) Hassan Shahsavan (AUS)
    - Men's Greco-Roman 96 kg: (gold) Anil Kumar (IND) (silver) Kakoma Bella-Lufu (RSA) (bronze) Eric Feunekes (CAN)

==== Volleyball ====
- Men's World Championship in Italy: (teams in **bold** advance to the semifinals)
  - Pool O in Rome: United States 1–3 Italy
    - Standings: United States 3 points (2 matches), Italy 2 (1), France 1 (1).
  - Pool P in Florence: Russia 1–3 **Serbia**
    - Standings: Serbia 4 points (2 matches), Argentina, Russia 1 (1).
  - Pool Q in Florence: Cuba 3–1 Spain
    - Standings: Bulgaria, Cuba 2 points (1 match), Spain 2 (2).
  - Pool R in Rome: Germany 3–0 Czech Republic
    - Standings: Germany, Brazil 2 points (1 match), Czech Republic 2 (2).

=== October 4, 2010 (Monday) ===
==== American football ====
- NFL Monday Night Football Week 4: New England Patriots 41, Miami Dolphins 14

==== Cricket ====
- Australia in India:
  - 1st Test in Mohali, day 4: Australia 428 (151.4 overs) and 192 (60.5 overs); India 405 (108.1 overs) and 55/4 (17 overs). India require another 161 runs with 6 wickets remaining.
- ICC Intercontinental Cup in Nairobi, day 3:
  - Afghanistan 464 (105 overs) and 207 (49.1 overs; James Ngoche 5/39); Kenya 160 (39.5 overs) and 324/6 (82 overs). Kenya require another 188 runs with 4 wickets remaining.

==== Football (soccer) ====
- OFC Women's Championship in Auckland, New Zealand: (teams in **bold** advance to the semifinals)
  - Group B:
    - Tonga 0–3 **Papua New Guinea**
    - Fiji 0–0 **Solomon Islands**
      - Final standings: Papua New Guinea 9 points, Solomon Islands 4, Tonga 3, Fiji 1.
- Caribbean Championship Qualifying Group Stage One:
  - Group A in Bayamón, Puerto Rico:
    - Cayman Islands 4–1 Anguilla
    - Puerto Rico 2–0 Saint Martin
      - Standings (after 2 matches): Puerto Rico 6 points, Cayman Islands 4, Saint-Martin 1, Anguilla 0.
- Copa Libertadores de Fútbol Femenino in Barueri, São Paulo, Brazil:
  - Group B:
    - Boca Juniors (Argentina) 4–1 (Bolivia) Florida
    - Everton (Chile) 9–0 (Peru) UP de Iquitos

==== Golf ====
- Ryder Cup in Newport, Wales: Team Europe 14½–13½ Team USA
  - Session 4 (singles):
    - Steve Stricker (USA) def. Lee Westwood (EUR) 2 & 1
    - Rory McIlroy (EUR) and Stewart Cink (USA) match halved
    - Luke Donald (EUR) def. Jim Furyk (USA) 1 up
    - Dustin Johnson (USA) def. Martin Kaymer (EUR) 6 & 4
    - Ian Poulter (EUR) def. Matt Kuchar (USA) 5 & 4
    - Jeff Overton (USA) def. Ross Fisher (EUR) 3 & 2
    - Miguel Ángel Jiménez (EUR) def. Bubba Watson (USA) 4 & 3
    - Tiger Woods (USA) def. Francesco Molinari (EUR) 4 & 3
    - Edoardo Molinari (EUR) and Rickie Fowler (USA) match halved
    - Phil Mickelson (USA) def. Peter Hanson (EUR) 4 & 2
    - Zach Johnson (USA) def. Pádraig Harrington (EUR) 3 & 2
    - Graeme McDowell (EUR) def. Hunter Mahan (USA) 3 & 1
      - Europe win the Cup for the eighth time, and regain the Cup they lost at Valhalla in 2008. This is the fourth successive time Europe win as the host.

==== Multi-sport events ====
- Commonwealth Games in Delhi, India:
  - Aquatics (swimming):
    - Men's:
      - 400m freestyle: (gold) Ryan Cochrane (CAN) 3:48.48 (silver) Ryan Napoleon (AUS) 3:48.59 (bronze) David Carry (SCO) 3:50.06
      - 200m butterfly: (gold) Chad le Clos (RSA) 1:56.48 (GR) (silver) Michael Rock (ENG) 1:57.15 (bronze) Stefan Hirniak (CAN) 1:57.26
      - 4 × 100 m freestyle relay: (gold) Australia (Tommaso D'Orsogna, James Magnussen, Kyle Richardson, Eamon Sullivan) 3:13.92 (GR) (silver) England 3:15.05 (bronze) South Africa 3:15.21
    - Women's:
      - 200m freestyle: (gold) Kylie Palmer (AUS) 1:57.50 (silver) Jazmin Carlin (WAL) 1:58.29 (bronze) Rebecca Adlington (ENG) 1:58.47
      - 200m individual medley: (gold) Alicia Coutts (AUS) 2:09.70 (GR) (silver) Emily Seebohm (AUS) 2:10.83 (bronze) Julia Wilkinson (CAN) 2:12.09
  - Gymnastics (artistic):
    - Men's team competition: (gold) Australia (Joshua Jefferis, Samuel Offord, Thomas Pichler, Prashanth Sellathurai, Luke Wiwatowski) 259.050 points (silver) England 256.750 (bronze) Canada 248.500
  - Weightlifting:
    - Men's 56 kg: (gold) Amirul Hamizan Ibrahim (MYS) 257 kg (silver) Sukhen Dey (IND) 252 kg (bronze) Srinivasa Rao Valluri (IND) 248 kg
    - Women's 48 kg: (gold) Augustina Nwaokolo (NGA) 175 kg (GR) (silver) Soniya Chanu (IND) 167 kg (bronze) Sandyha Atom (IND) 165 kg

==== Volleyball ====
- Men's World Championship in Italy:
  - Pool O in Rome: France 0–3 United States
  - Pool P in Florence: Serbia 3–1 Argentina
  - Pool Q in Florence: Spain 1–3 Bulgaria
  - Pool R in Rome: Czech Republic 2–3 Brazil

=== October 3, 2010 (Sunday) ===
==== American football ====
- NFL, Week 4:
  - Atlanta Falcons 16, San Francisco 49ers 14
  - Cleveland Browns 23, Cincinnati Bengals 20
  - New York Jets 38, Buffalo Bills 14
  - St. Louis Rams 20, Seattle Seahawks 3
  - Denver Broncos 26, Tennessee Titans 20
  - Green Bay Packers 28, Detroit Lions 26
  - Baltimore Ravens 17, Pittsburgh Steelers 14
  - New Orleans Saints 16, Carolina Panthers 14
  - Jacksonville Jaguars 31, Indianapolis Colts 28
  - Houston Texans 31, Oakland Raiders 24
  - Washington Redskins 17, Philadelphia Eagles 12
  - San Diego Chargers 41, Arizona Cardinals 10
  - Sunday Night Football: New York Giants 17, Chicago Bears 3
  - Byes: Dallas Cowboys, Kansas City Chiefs, Minnesota Vikings, Tampa Bay Buccaneers
    - The Chiefs remain the only unbeaten team after just four weeks.

==== Auto racing ====
- Chase for the Sprint Cup:
  - Price Chopper 400 in Kansas City: (1) (Washington (state)) Greg Biffle (Ford; Roush Fenway Racing) (2) (California) Jimmie Johnson (Chevrolet; Hendrick Motorsports) (3) (California) Kevin Harvick (Chevrolet; Richard Childress Racing)
    - Drivers' championship standings (after 29 of 36 races): (1) Johnson 5503 points (2) (Virginia) Denny Hamlin (Toyota; Joe Gibbs Racing) 5495 (3) Harvick 5473
- World Rally Championship:
  - Rallye de France in Alsace: (1) Sébastien Loeb (FRA)/Daniel Elena (MON) (Citroën C4 WRC) (2) Dani Sordo (ESP)/Diego Vallejo (ESP) (Citroën C4 WRC) (3) Petter Solberg (NOR)/Chris Patterson (GBR) (Citroën C4 WRC)
    - Drivers' championship standings (after 11 of 13 rounds): (1) Loeb 226 points (2) Sébastien Ogier (FRA) (Citroën C4 WRC) 166 (3) Jari-Matti Latvala (FIN) (Ford Focus RS WRC 09) 144
      - Loeb's 60th WRC win gives him his seventh successive title.

==== Baseball ====
- Major League Baseball:
  - National League:
    - Atlanta Braves 8, Philadelphia Phillies 7
    - San Francisco Giants 3, San Diego Padres 0
      - The NL playoffs are now set, with the Giants winning the NL West and booking a date with the wild-card Braves in the Division Series, while the Philadelphia Phillies will take on the Cincinnati Reds in the other NLDS.
  - American League:
    - Boston Red Sox 8, New York Yankees 4
    - Tampa Bay Rays 3, Kansas City Royals 2 (12 innings)
      - The Yankees' loss gives the Rays the AL East title and a Division Series date with the Texas Rangers, while the Yankees claim the AL wild card and will play the Minnesota Twins in the other ALDS.

==== Basketball ====
- FIBA World Championship for Women in Karlovy Vary, Czech Republic:
  - 7th place playoff: South Korea 76–87 **Russia**
  - 5th place playoff: France 62–74 **Australia**
  - 3rd place playoff: (bronze) **Spain** 77–68 Belarus
  - Final: (gold) **United States** 89–69 (silver) Czech Republic
    - The USA wins its record eighth title.

==== Chess ====
- 39th Olympiad in Khanty-Mansiysk, Russia:
  - Open: (gold) Ukraine 19 MP (silver) Russia 1 18 MP (bronze) Israel 17 MP
    - Ukraine win the title for the second time.
  - Women: (gold) Russia 1 22 MP (silver) China 18 MP (bronze) Georgia 16 MP
    - Russia win the title for the first time (as a separate state).

==== Cricket ====
- Australia in India:
  - 1st Test in Mohali, day 3: Australia 428 (151.4 overs); India 405 (108.1 overs; Mitchell Johnson 5/64). India trail by 23 runs.
- ICC Intercontinental Cup in Nairobi, day 2:
  - Afghanistan 464 (105 overs; Nawroz Mangal 168) and 166/5 (38 overs); Kenya 160 (39.5 overs; Hamid Hassan 5/70). Afghanistan lead by 470 runs with 5 wickets remaining.

==== Cycling ====
- UCI Road World Championships in Melbourne and Geelong, Australia:
  - Men's road race: (gold) Thor Hushovd (NOR) 6h 21' 49" (silver) Matti Breschel (DEN) s.t. (bronze) Allan Davis (AUS) s.t.

==== Equestrianism ====
- FEI World Games in Lexington, Kentucky, United States:
  - Eventing Individual: (gold) Michael Jung (GER) on Sam FBW (silver) William Fox-Pitt (GBR) on Cool Mountain (bronze) Andrew Nicholson (NZL) on Nereo
  - Eventing Team: (gold) Great Britain (silver) Canada (bronze) New Zealand

==== Football (soccer) ====
- 2011 FIFA Women's World Cup qualification (UEFA):
  - Repechage I, first leg: Denmark 1–3 Switzerland
- OFC Women's Championship in Auckland, New Zealand:
  - Group A: (teams in **bold** advance to the semi-finals)
    - Tahiti 0–7 **New Zealand**
    - Vanuatu 0–2 **Cook Islands**
      - Final standings: New Zealand 9 points, Cook Islands 6, Tahiti 3, Vanuatu 0.
- WAFF Championship in Amman, Jordan:
  - Final: (silver) Iran 1–2 (gold) **Kuwait**
    - Kuwait win the title for the first time and deny Iran a fourth successive win.
- CAF Champions League semifinals, first leg:
  - Al-Ahly (Egypt) 2–1 (Tunisia) Espérance ST
  - TP Mazembe (Democratic Republic of the Congo) 3–1 (Algeria) JS Kabylie
- CAF Confederation Cup group stage, matchday 5: (teams in **bold** advance to the semifinals)
  - Group A:
    - Djoliba (Mali) 1–0 (Niger) ASFAN
    - **Al-Hilal** (Sudan) 2–1 (Libya) Ittihad
      - Standings (after 5 matches): Al-Hilal 12 points, Ittihad 9, Djoliba 7, ASFAN 1.

==== Golf ====
- Ryder Cup in Newport, Wales: Team Europe 9½–6½ Team USA
  - Session 3 (four-ball and foursome):
    - Luke Donald/Lee Westwood (EUR) def. Steve Stricker/Tiger Woods (USA) 6 & 5
    - Rory McIlroy/Graeme McDowell (EUR) def. Zach Johnson/Hunter Mahan (USA) 3 & 1
    - Pádraig Harrington/Ross Fisher (EUR) def. Jim Furyk/Dustin Johnson (USA) 2 & 1
    - Miguel Ángel Jiménez/Peter Hanson (EUR) def. Bubba Watson/Jeff Overton (USA) 2 up
    - Stewart Cink/Matt Kuchar (USA) and Francesco Molinari/Edoardo Molinari (EUR) match halved
    - Ian Poulter/Martin Kaymer (EUR) def. Phil Mickelson/Rickie Fowler (USA) 2 & 1
  - After further rain delays the start of today's play, it is announced that all singles matches (Session 4) will be held Monday.
- PGA Tour Fall Series:
  - Viking Classic in Madison, Mississippi:
    - Winner: Bill Haas (USA) 273 (−15)
      - Haas wins his second PGA Tour title of the season and his career.
- Champions Tour:
  - Ensure Classic at Rock Barn in Conover, North Carolina:
    - Winner: Gary Hallberg (USA) 198 (−18)
      - Hallberg wins his first Champions Tour title.

==== Horse racing ====
- Prix de l'Arc de Triomphe in Paris: (gold) Workforce (trainer: Michael Stoute, jockey: Ryan L. Moore) (silver) Nakayama Festa (trainer: Yoshitaka Ninomiya, jockey: Masyoshi Ebina) (bronze) Sarafina (trainer: Alain de Royer-Dupré, jockey: Gérald Mossé)

==== Motorcycle racing ====
- Moto GP:
  - Japanese Grand Prix in Motegi:
    - MotoGP: (1) Casey Stoner (AUS) (Ducati) (2) Andrea Dovizioso (ITA) (Honda) (3) Valentino Rossi (ITA) (Yamaha)
      - Riders' championship standings (after 14 of 18 rounds): (1) Jorge Lorenzo (ESP) (Yamaha) 297 points (2) Dani Pedrosa (ESP) (Honda) 228 (3) Stoner 180
      - Manufacturers' championship standings: (1) Yamaha 309 points (2) Honda 285 (3) Ducati 220
    - Moto2: (1) Toni Elías (ESP) (Moriwaki) (2) Julián Simón (ESP) (Suter) (3) Karel Abrahám (CZE) (FTR)
      - Riders' championship standings (after 13 of 17 rounds): (1) Elías 249 points (2) Simón 168 (3) Andrea Iannone (ITA) (Speed Up) 147
      - Manufacturers' championship standings: (1) Moriwaki 274 points (2) Suter 236 (3) Speed Up 172
    - 125cc: (1) Marc Márquez (ESP) (Derbi) (2) Nicolás Terol (ESP) (Aprilia) (3) Bradley Smith (GBR) (Aprilia)
      - Riders' championship standings (after 13 of 17 rounds): (1) Terol 228 points (2) Márquez 222 (3) Pol Espargaró (ESP) (Derbi) 215
      - Manufacturers' championship standings: (1) Derbi 310 points (2) Aprilia 271 (3) Honda 19
- Superbike:
  - Magny-Cours World Championship round in Magny-Cours, France:
    - Race 1: (1) Cal Crutchlow (GBR) (Yamaha YZF-R1) (2) Leon Haslam (GBR) (Suzuki GSX-R1000) (3) Carlos Checa (ESP) (Ducati 1098R)
    - Race 2: (1) Max Biaggi (ITA) (Aprilia RSV 4) (2) Crutchlow (3) Michel Fabrizio (ITA) (Ducati 1098R)
      - Final riders' championship standings: (1) Biaggi 451 points (2) Haslam 376 (3) Checa 297
      - Final manufacturers' championship standings: (1) Aprilia 471 points (2) Ducati 424 (3) Suzuki 412
- Supersport:
  - Magny-Cours World Championship round in Magny-Cours, France: (1) Eugene Laverty (IRL) (Honda CBR600RR) (2) Kenan Sofuoğlu (TUR) (Honda CBR600RR) (3) Chaz Davies (GBR) (Triumph Daytona 675)
    - Final riders' championship standings : (1) Sofuoğlu 263 points (2) Laverty 252 (3) Joan Lascorz (ESP) (Kawasaki Ninja ZX-6R) 168
      - Sofuoğlu wins his second world title.
    - Final manufacturers' championship standings: (1) Honda 320 points (2) Kawasaki 211 (3) Triumph 168

==== Rugby league ====
- NRL finals series:
  - Grand Final in Sydney: Sydney Roosters 8–32 **St. George Illawarra Dragons**
    - St. George win their first premiership title.

==== Snooker ====
- Players Tour Championship:
  - Euro Event 2 in Bruges:
    - Final: **Shaun Murphy** (ENG) 4–2 Matthew Couch (ENG)
      - Murphy wins the tenth professional title of his career.
      - Order of Merit (after 6 of 12 events): (1) Barry Pinches (ENG) 17,100 (2) Mark Williams (WAL) 15,400 (3) Mark Selby (ENG) 14,900

==== Tennis ====
- ATP World Tour:
  - PTT Thailand Open:
    - Final: **Guillermo García López** (ESP) def. Jarkko Nieminen (FIN) 6–4, 3–6, 6–4
      - García López wins his first title of the year and second of his career.
  - Proton Malaysian Open:
    - Final: **Mikhail Youzhny** (RUS) def. Andrey Golubev (KAZ) 6–7(2), 6–2, 7–6(3)
      - Youzhny wins the seventh title of his career.

=== October 2, 2010 (Saturday) ===
==== American football ====
- NCAA:
  - AP Top 10:
    - (1) Alabama 31, (7) Florida 6
    - (2) Ohio State 24, Illinois 13
    - (3) Boise State 59, New Mexico State 0
    - (4) Oregon 52, (9) Stanford 31
    - (5) TCU 27, Colorado State 0
    - Red River Rivalry: (8) Oklahoma 28, (21) Texas 20
    - (10) Auburn 52, Louisiana–Monroe 3
  - Other games:
    - (24) Michigan State 34, (11) Wisconsin 24
    - (17) Iowa 24, (22) Penn State 3
    - Washington 32, (18) USC 31
    - Virginia Tech 41, (23) North Carolina State 30
  - Idle: (6) Nebraska

==== Australian rules football ====
- AFL finals series:
  - Grand Final Replay in Melbourne: **Collingwood** 16.12 (108)–7.10 (52) St Kilda
    - The Magpies collect their 15th premiership and first since 1990.

==== Auto racing ====
- Nationwide Series:
  - Kansas Lottery 300 in Kansas City: (1) (Connecticut) Joey Logano (Toyota; Joe Gibbs Racing) (2) (Michigan) Brad Keselowski (Dodge; Penske Racing) (3) (Nevada) Kyle Busch (Toyota; Joe Gibbs Racing)
    - Drivers' championship standings (after 29 of 35 races): (1) Keselowski 4589 points (2) (Missouri) Carl Edwards (Ford; Roush Fenway Racing) 4215 (3) Busch 4089
- IndyCar Series:
  - Cafés do Brasil Indy 300 in Homestead, Florida: (1) Scott Dixon (NZL) (Chip Ganassi Racing) (2) Danica Patrick (USA) (Andretti Autosport) (3) Tony Kanaan (BRA) (Andretti Autosport)
    - Final drivers' championship standings: (1) Dario Franchitti (GBR) (Chip Ganassi Racing) 602 points (2) Will Power (AUS) (Team Penske) 597 (3) Dixon 547
      - Franchitti wins his third championship in four years.

==== Basketball ====
- FIBA World Championship for Women in Karlovy Vary, Czech Republic:
  - Semifinals:
    - **Czech Republic** 81–77 Belarus
    - **United States** 106–70 Spain
  - 5th–8th semifinals:
    - **Australia** 78–73 Russia
    - South Korea 46–61 **France**
  - 11th place playoff: **Greece** 71–55 Canada
  - 9th place playoff: Japan 79–84 **Brazil**

==== Cricket ====
- Australia in India:
  - 1st Test in Mohali, day 2: Australia 428 (151.4 overs; Shane Watson 126, Zaheer Khan 5/94); India 110/2 (21 overs). India trail by 318 runs with 8 wickets remaining in the 1st innings.
- ICC Intercontinental Cup in Nairobi, day 1:
  - Afghanistan 440/6 (93 overs; Nawroz Mangal 168*); Kenya.

==== Cycling ====
- UCI Road World Championships in Melbourne and Geelong, Victoria, Australia:
  - Women's road race: (gold) Giorgia Bronzini (ITA) 3h 32' 01" (silver) Marianne Vos (NED) s.t. (bronze) Emma Johansson (SWE) s.t.

==== Figure skating ====
- ISU Junior Grand Prix in Sheffield, Great Britain: (skaters in **bold** qualify for ISU Junior Grand Prix Final)
  - Men: (gold) **Joshua Farris** (USA) 187.74 (silver) Zhan Bush (RUS) 172.80 (bronze) Liam Firus (CAN) 166.38
    - Standings (after 5 of 7 events): **Andrei Rogozine** (CAN) 30 points (2 events), Farris 28 (2), **Max Aaron** (USA), Bush 24 (2), Jason Brown (USA), Firus 18 (2), Keiji Tanaka (JPN) 16 (2), Keegan Messing (USA), Yan Han (CHN) 15 (1)... Artem Grigoriev (RUS) 13 (1).
  - Ice Dance: (gold) **Ksenia Monko / Kirill Khaliavin** (RUS) 155.04 (silver) **Victoria Sinitsina / Ruslan Zhiganshin** (RUS) 133.86 (bronze) Nicole Orford / Thomas Williams (CAN) 115.66
    - Standings (after 5 of 7 events): Monko / Khaliavin, **Alexandra Stepanova / Ivan Bukin** (RUS) 30 points (2 events), Sinitsina / Zhiganshin 26 (2), Anastasia Cannuscio / Colin McManus (USA) 22 (2), Gabriella Papadakis / Guillaume Cizeron (FRA) 20 (2), Geraldine Bott / Neil Brown (FRA), Lauri Bonacorsi / Travis Mager (USA) 18 (2), Charlotte Lichtman / Dean Copley (USA) 15 (1)... Ekaterina Pushkash / Jonathan Guerreiro (RUS), Anastasia Galyeta / Alexei Shumski (UKR) 13 (1).

==== Football (soccer) ====
- 2011 FIFA Women's World Cup qualification (UEFA):
  - Repechage I, first leg: Ukraine 0–3 Italy
- OFC Women's Championship in Auckland, New Zealand:
  - Group B:
    - Tonga 2–1 Fiji
    - Solomon Islands 1–2 Papua New Guinea
      - Standings (after 2 matches): Papua New Guinea 6 points, Solomon Islands, Tonga 3 points, Fiji 0.
- Caribbean Championship Qualifying Group Stage One:
  - Group A in Bayamón, Puerto Rico:
    - Saint Martin 1–1 Cayman Islands
    - Puerto Rico 3–1 Anguilla
- CAF Confederation Cup group stage, matchday 5 (teams in **bold** advance to the semifinals):
  - Group B:
    - Zanaco (Zambia) 1–1 (Morocco) **FUS Rabat**
    - **CS Sfaxien** (Tunisia) 3–1 (Egypt) Haras El Hodood
      - Standings (after 5 matches): FUS Rabat, CS Sfaxien 10 points, Zanaco 5, Haras El Hodood 2.
- Copa Libertadores de Fútbol Femenino in Barueri, São Paulo, Brazil:
  - Group A:
    - Santos (Brazil) 2–0 (Venezuela) Caracas
    - Deportivo Quito (Ecuador) 1–1 (Uruguay) River Plate

==== Golf ====
- Ryder Cup in Newport, Wales: Team Europe 4–6 Team USA
  - Session 1 (four-ball):
    - Lee Westwood/Martin Kaymer (EUR) def. Phil Mickelson/Dustin Johnson (USA) 3 & 2
    - Stewart Cink/Matt Kuchar (USA) and Rory McIlroy/Graeme McDowell (EUR) match halved
    - Steve Stricker/Tiger Woods (USA) def. Ian Poulter/Ross Fisher (EUR) 2 up
    - Bubba Watson/Jeff Overton (USA) def. Luke Donald/Pádraig Harrington (EUR) 3 & 2
  - Session 2 (foursome):
    - Zach Johnson/Hunter Mahan (USA) def. Francesco Molinari/Edoardo Molinari (EUR) 2 up
    - Lee Westwood/Martin Kaymer (EUR) and Jim Furyk/Rickie Fowler (USA) match halved
    - Pádraig Harrington/Ross Fisher (EUR) def. Phil Mickelson/Dustin Johnson (USA) 3 & 2
    - Steve Stricker/Tiger Woods (USA) def. Miguel Ángel Jiménez/Peter Hanson (EUR) 4 & 3
    - Ian Poulter/Luke Donald (EUR) def. Bubba Watson/Jeff Overton (USA) 2 & 1
    - Stewart Cink/Matt Kuchar (USA) def. Rory McIlroy/Graeme McDowell (EUR) 1 up
  - Session 3 (four-ball and foursome):
    - Luke Donald/Lee Westwood (EUR) lead Steve Stricker/Tiger Woods (USA) 4 up after 9 holes
    - Pádraig Harrington/Ross Fisher (EUR) lead Jim Furyk/Dustin Johnson (USA) 1 up after 8 holes
    - Rory McIlroy/Graeme McDowell (EUR) lead Zach Johnson/Hunter Mahan (USA) 3 up after 7 holes
    - Miguel Ángel Jiménez/Peter Hanson (EUR) lead Bubba Watson/Jeff Overton (USA) 2 up after 6 holes
    - Francesco Molinari/Edoardo Molinari (EUR) lead Stewart Cink/Matt Kuchar (USA) 1 up after 5 holes
    - Ian Poulter/Martin Kaymer (EUR) lead Phil Mickelson/Rickie Fowler (USA) 2 up after 4 holes
  - Play suspended in Session 3 due to darkness. These matches will resume Sunday at 7:45 am BST.

==== Rugby league ====
- Super League XV:
  - Grand Final in Manchester: **Wigan Warriors** 22–10 St. Helens
    - Wigan win their second Super League title, and 19th title overall.

==== Tennis ====
- WTA Tour:
  - Toray Pan Pacific Open:
    - Final: **Caroline Wozniacki** (DEN) def. Elena Dementieva (RUS) 1–6, 6–2, 6–3
      - Wozniacki wins her fifth title of the year and eleventh of her career.

==== Volleyball ====
- Men's World Championship in Italy: (teams in **bold** advance to the third round)
  - Pool G in Catania: **Italy** 3–1 Puerto Rico
    - Final standings: Italy 4 points, **Germany** 3, Puerto Rico 2.
  - Pool H in Milan: **Serbia** 3–0 Mexico
    - Final standings: Serbia 4 points, **Cuba** 3, Mexico 2.
  - Pool I in Catania: Egypt 1–3 **Spain**
    - Final standings: Spain 4 points, **Russia** 3, Egypt 2.
  - Pool L in Ancona: **Czech Republic** 3–0 Cameroon
    - Final standings: Czech Republic 4 points, **United States** 3, Cameroon 2.
  - Pool M in Milan: **Argentina** 3–1 Japan
    - Final standings: Argentina 4 points, **France** 3, Japan 2.
  - Pool N in Ancona: **Brazil** 0–3 **Bulgaria**
    - Final standings: Bulgaria 4 points, Brazil 3, Poland 2.

=== October 1, 2010 (Friday) ===
==== Basketball ====
- FIBA World Championship for Women in Karlovy Vary, Czech Republic:
  - Quarterfinals:
    - **Belarus** 70–53 Russia
    - **United States** 106–44 South Korea
    - Australia 68–79 **Czech Republic**
    - France 71–74 (OT) **Spain**
  - 9th–12th semifinals:
    - Greece 59–63 **Japan**
    - Canada 58–64 **Brazil**

==== Cricket ====
- Australia in India:
  - 1st Test in Mohali, day 1: Australia 224/5 (90 overs; Shane Watson 101*); India.

==== Cycling ====
- UCI Road World Championships in Melbourne and Geelong, Victoria, Australia:
  - Men's under-23 road race: (gold) Michael Matthews (AUS) 4:01:23 (silver) John Degenkolb (GER) s.t. (bronze) Taylor Phinney (USA) & Guillaume Boivin (CAN) s.t.

==== Equestrianism ====
- FEI World Games in Lexington, Kentucky, United States:
  - Dressage Grand Prix Freestyle: (gold) Edward Gal (NED) on Moorlands Totilas 91.80% (silver) Laura Bechtolsheimer (GBR) on Mistral Hojris 85.35% (bronze) Steffen Peters (USA) on Ravel 84.90%

==== Figure skating ====
- ISU Junior Grand Prix in Sheffield, Great Britain: (skaters in **bold** qualify for ISU Junior Grand Prix Final)
  - Ice Dance Short Dance: (1) Ksenia Monko / Kirill Khaliavin (RUS) 65.12 (2) Victoria Sinitsina / Ruslan Zhiganshin (RUS) 53.52 (3) Nicole Orford / Thomas Williams (CAN) 46.51
  - Pairs: (gold) **Ksenia Stolbova / Fedor Klimov** (RUS) 151.64 (silver) Narumi Takahashi / Mervin Tran (JPN) 144.69 (bronze) Natasha Purich / Raymond Schultz (CAN) 126.98
    - Standings (after 2 of 4 events): Stolbova / Klimov 30 points (2 events), Sui Wenjing / Han Cong (CHN), Takashi / Tran 13 (1), Yu Xiaoyu / Jin Yang (CHN), Purich / Raymond Shultz 11 (1), Taylor Steele / Robert Schultz (CAN), Tatiana Danilova / Andrei Novoselov (RUS) 9 (1).
  - Ladies: (gold) **Adelina Sotnikova** (RUS) 166.70 (silver) **Yasmin Siraj** (USA) 161.75 (bronze) Yuki Nishino (JPN) 135.58
    - Standings (after 5 of 7 events): Sotnikova 30 points (2 events), Siraj 26 (2), Kristiene Gong (USA) 22 (2), Shion Kokubun (JPN) 18 (2), Rosa Sheveleva (RUS) 16 (2), Polina Shelepen (RUS), Risa Shoji (JPN), Elizaveta Tuktamysheva (RUS) 15 (1)... Christina Gao (USA), Kiri Baga (USA) 13 (1).

==== Football (soccer) ====
- OFC Women's Championship in Auckland, New Zealand:
  - Group A:
    - Tahiti 5–1 Vanuatu
    - Cook Islands 0–10 New Zealand
      - Standings (after 2 matches): New Zealand 6 points, Tahiti, Cook Islands 3, Vanuatu 0.
- WAFF Championship in Amman, Jordan:
  - Semifinals:
    - **Iran** 2–1 Iraq
    - **Kuwait** 1–1 (4–3 pen.) Yemen

==== Golf ====
- Ryder Cup in Newport, Wales: Team Europe vs. Team USA
  - Session 1 (four-ball):
    - Lee Westwood/Martin Kaymer (EUR) lead Phil Mickelson/Dustin Johnson (USA) 1 up after 12 holes
    - Stewart Cink/Matt Kuchar (USA) lead Rory McIlroy/Graeme McDowell (EUR) 2 up after 11 holes
    - Ian Poulter/Ross Fisher (EUR) and Steve Stricker/Tiger Woods (USA) all square after 10 holes
    - Bubba Watson/Jeff Overton (USA) lead Luke Donald/Pádraig Harrington (EUR) 1 up after 8 holes
  - Play is disrupted by rain which kept the players off course for over seven hours, and led to the postponement of the afternoon foursomes until Saturday.

==== Volleyball ====
- Men's World Championship in Italy: (teams in **bold** advance to the third round)
  - Pool G in Catania: Germany 1–3 Italy
    - Standings: Germany 3 points (2 games), Italy 2 (1), Puerto Rico 1 (1).
  - Pool H in Milan: Mexico 0–3 **Cuba**
    - Standings: Cuba 3 points (2 games), Serbia 2 (1), Mexico 1 (1).
  - Pool I in Catania: Spain 3–2 **Russia**
    - Standings: Russia 3 points (2 games), Spain 2 (1), Egypt 1 (1).
  - Pool L in Ancona: Cameroon 2–3 **United States**
    - Standings: USA 3 points (2 games), Czech Republic 2 (1), Cameroon 1 (1).
  - Pool M in Milan: Japan 0–3 **France**
    - Standings: France 3 points (2 games), Argentina 2 (1), Japan 1 (1).
  - Pool N in Ancona: **Bulgaria** 3–0 Poland
    - Standings: **Brazil**, Bulgaria 2 points (1 game), Poland 2 (2).
