= Australia at the 2010 Commonwealth Games =

- CG code: AUS
- CGA: Australian Commonwealth Games Association
- Website: commonwealthgames.org.au

in Delhi, India
- Competitors: 368
- Flag bearers: Opening: Sharelle McMahon; Closing: Alicia Coutts
- Officials: 177
- Medals Ranked 1st: Gold 74 Silver 55 Bronze 48 Total 177

Commonwealth Games appearances (overview)
- 1930; 1934; 1938; 1950; 1954; 1958; 1962; 1966; 1970; 1974; 1978; 1982; 1986; 1990; 1994; 1998; 2002; 2006; 2010; 2014; 2018; 2022; 2026; 2030

Australia competed at the 2010 Commonwealth Games in Delhi, India.

== Medallists ==
Medal	Name	Sport	Event	Date
Gold	Matthew Gray; Matthew Masonwells; Taylor Worth	Archery	Men's recurve team	6 October
Gold	Joel Milburn; Kevin Moore; Brendan Cole; Sean Wroe; Ben Offereins	Athletics	Men's 4 × 400 metres relay	6 October
Gold	Jared Tallent	Athletics	Men's 20 kilometres walk	
Gold	Steven Hooker	Athletics	Men's pole vault	
Gold	Fabrice Lapierre	Athletics	Men's long jump	
Gold	Benn Harradine	Athletics	Men's discus throw	
Gold	Jarrod Bannister	Athletics	Men's javelin throw	
Gold	Simon Patmore	Athletics	Men's 100 metres (T46)	
Gold	Kurt Fearnley	Athletics	Men's 1500 metres (T54)	
Gold	Sally Pearson	Athletics	Women's 100 metres hurdles	
Gold	Alana Boyd	Athletics	Women's pole vault	
Gold	Louise Ellery	Athletics	Women's shot put (F32–34/52/53)	
Gold	Allan Davis	Cycling	Men's road race	
Gold	Rochelle Gilmore	Cycling	Women's road race	
Gold	Jack Bobridge	Cycling	Men's individual pursuit	
Gold	Jack Bobridge; Michael Hepburn; Cameron Meyer; Dale Parker	Cycling	Men's team pursuit	
Gold	Shane Perkins	Cycling	Men's individual sprint	
Gold	Anna Meares	Cycling	Women's individual sprint	
Gold	Dan Ellis; Jason Niblett; Scott Sunderland	Cycling	Men's team sprint	
Gold	Anna Meares; Kaarle McCulloch	Cycling	Women's team sprint	
Gold	Cameron Meyer	Cycling	Men's points race	
Gold	Cameron Meyer	Cycling	Men's scratch race	
Gold	Megan Dunn	Cycling	Women's points race	
Gold	Megan Dunn	Cycling	Women's scratch race	
Gold	Scott Sunderland	Cycling	Men's 1 km time trial	
Gold	Anna Meares	Cycling	Women's 500m time trial	
Gold	Sharleen Stratton	Diving	Women's 3 metre springboard	13 October
Gold	Melissa Wu; Alexandra Croak	Diving	Women's 10 metre synchro springboard	10 October
Gold	Joshua Jefferis; Samuel Offord; Thomas Pichler; Prashanth Sellathurai; Luke Wiwatowski	Gymnastics	Men's artistic team all-around	
Gold	Thomas Pichler	Gymnastics	Men's floor	
Gold	Prashanth Sellathurai	Gymnastics	Men's pommel horse	
Gold	Samuel Offord	Gymnastics	Men's rings	
Gold	Joshua Jefferis	Gymnastics	Men's parallel bars	
Gold	Ashleigh Brennan; Georgia Bonora; Emily Little; Lauren Mitchell; Georgia Wheeler	Gymnastics	Women's artistic team all-around	
Gold	Lauren Mitchell	Gymnastics	Women's artistic individual all-around	
Gold	Lauren Mitchell	Gymnastics	Women's uneven bars	
Gold	Lauren Mitchell	Gymnastics	Women's balance beam	
Gold	Naazmi Johnston; Janine Murray; Danielle Prince	Gymnastics	Women's rhythmic team all-around	
Gold	Naazmi Johnston	Gymnastics	Women's rhythmic individual all-around	
Gold	Naazmi Johnston	Gymnastics	Women's rhythmic individual ball	
Gold	Australia men's national field hockey team: Chris Ciriello Des Abbott Eddie Ockenden Fergus Kavanagh Glenn Turner Jamie Dwyer Jason Wilson Joel Carroll Liam De Young Luke Doerner Mark Knowles Matthew Swann Nathan Burgers Robert Hammond Simon Orchard Trent Mitton	Hockey	Men's team	
Gold	Australia women's national field hockey team: Alison Bruce Ashleigh Nelson Emily Hurtz Fiona Boyce Anna Flannagan Fiona Johnson Jayde Taylor Kate Jenner Kate Hollywood Madonna Blyth Megan Rivers Nicole Arrold Rachael Lynch Casey Sablowski Shelly Liddelow Toni Cronk	Hockey	Women's team	
Gold	Michael Diamond; Adam Vella	Shooting	Men's trap pairs	
Gold	Laetisha Scanlan; Stacy Roiall	Shooting	Women's trap pairs	
Gold	Alethea Sedgman	Shooting	Women's 50m rifle three positions singles	
Gold	Cameron Pilley; Kasey Brown	Squash	Mixed doubles	
Gold	Matthew Cowdrey	Swimming	Men's 50 metre freestyle S9	6 October
Gold	Ben Austin	Swimming	Men's 100 metre freestyle S8	8 October
Gold	Brenton Rickard	Swimming	Men's 200 metre breaststroke	9 October
Gold	Geoffrey Huegill	Swimming	Men's 100 metre butterfly	8 October
Gold	Kyle Richardson; James Magnussen; Eamon Sullivan; Tommaso D'Orsogna	Swimming	Men's 4 × 100 metre freestyle relay	4 October
Gold	Thomas Fraser-Holmes; Nicholas Ffrost; Ryan Napoleon; Kenrick Monk	Swimming	Men's 4 × 200 metre freestyle relay	6 October
Gold	Ashley Delaney; Brenton Rickard; Geoffrey Huegill; Eamon Sullivan	Swimming	Men's 4 × 100 metre medley relay	9 October
Gold	Yolane Kukla	Swimming	Women's 50 metre freestyle	8 October
Gold	Alicia Coutts	Swimming	Women's 100 metre freestyle	6 October
Gold	Kylie Palmer	Swimming	Women's 200 metre freestyle	4 October
Gold	Sophie Edington	Swimming	Women's 50 metre backstroke	8 October
Gold	Emily Seebohm	Swimming	Women's 100 metre backstroke	6 October
Gold	Meagen Nay	Swimming	Women's 200 metre backstroke	8 October
Gold	Leiston Pickett	Swimming	Women's 50 metre breaststroke	5 October
Gold	Leisel Jones	Swimming	Women's 100 metre breaststroke	8 October
Gold	Leisel Jones	Swimming	Women's 200 metre breaststroke	6 October
Gold	Alicia Coutts	Swimming	Women's 100 metre butterfly	7 October
Gold	Jessicah Schipper	Swimming	Women's 200 metre butterfly	9 October
Gold	Alicia Coutts	Swimming	Women's 200 metre individual medley	4 October
Gold	Alicia Coutts; Marieke Guehrer; Felicity Galvez; Emily Seebohm	Swimming	Women's 4 × 100 metre freestyle relay	8 October
Gold	Emily Seebohm; Leisel Jones; Jessicah Schipper; Alicia Coutts	Swimming	Women's 4 × 100 metre medley relay	9 October
Gold	Kylie Palmer; Blair Evans; Bronte Barratt; Meagen Nay	Swimming	Women's 4 × 200 metre freestyle relay	6 October
Gold	Anastasia Rodionova	Tennis	Women's singles	
Gold	Anastasia Rodionova; Sally Peers	Tennis	Women's doubles	
Gold	Paul Hanley; Peter Luczak	Tennis	Men's doubles	
Gold	Simplice Ribouem	Weightlifting	Men's 85 kg	
Gold	Damon Kelly	Weightlifting	Men's +105kg	
Gold	Ivan Popov	Wrestling	Men's Greco-Roman 120 kg	6 October
Silver	Sean Wroe	Athletics	Men's 800 metres	
Silver	Michael Shelley	Athletics	Marathon	
Silver	Luke Adams	Athletics	Men's 20 km walk	
Silver	Richard Colman	Athletics	Men's 1500 metres T54	
Silver	Claire Tallent	Athletics	Women's 20 km walk	
Silver	Kim Mickle	Athletics	Women's javelin throw	
Silver	Scott Sunderland	Cycling	Men's individual sprint	
Silver	Michael Freiberg	Cycling	Men's scratch	
Silver	Kaarle McCulloch	Cycling	Women's 500m time trial	
Silver	Matthew Mitcham	Diving	Men's 1 metre springboard	10 October
Silver	Briony Cole; Sharleen Stratton	Diving	Women's 3 metre synchro springboard	10 October
Silver	Melissa Wu	Diving	Women's 10 metre platform	11 October
Silver	Matthew Mitcham; Ethan Warren	Diving	Men's 3 metre synchro springboard	12 October
Silver	Matthew Mitcham; Ethan Warren	Diving	Men's 10 metre synchro platform	12 October
Silver	Sharleen Stratton	Diving	Women's 1 metre springboard	12 October
Silver	Matthew Mitcham	Diving	Men's 10 metre platform	13 October
Silver	Emily Little	Gymnastics	Women's artistic individual all-around	
Silver	Georgia Bonora	Gymnastics	Women's uneven bars	
Silver	Lauren Mitchell	Gymnastics	Women's floor	
Silver	Naazmi Johnston	Gymnastics	Women's rhythmic individual ribbon	
Silver	Naazmi Johnston	Gymnastics	Women's rhythmic individual rope	
Silver	Leif Selby	Lawn bowls	Men's singles	
Silver	Mark Casey; Wayne Turley; Brett Wilkie	Lawn bowls	Men's triples	
Silver	Claire Duke; Julie Keegan; Sharyn Renshaw	Lawn bowls	Women's triples	
Silver	Australia national netball team: Rebecca Bulley Catherine Cox Laura Geitz Susan Fuhrmann Mo'onia Gerrard Kimberlee Green Renae Hallinan Sharelle McMahon Natalie Medhurst Lauren Nourse Susan Pratley Natalie von Bertouch	Netball	Women's team	
Silver	Australia national rugby sevens team: Bernard Foley Shaun Foley James Stannard Kimami Sitauti Lachie Turner Liam Gill Luke Morahan Nick Phipps Nick Cummins Ed Jenkins Pat McCutcheon Robbie Coleman	Rugby sevens	Men's team	
Silver	Michael Diamond	Shooting	Men's trap singles	
Silver	Dina Aspandiyarova; Pamela McKenzie	Shooting	Women's 10m air pistols pairs	
Silver	Linda Ryan; Lalita Yauhleuskaya	Shooting	Women's 25m pistol pairs	
Silver	Warren Potent	Shooting	Men's 50m rifle prone singles	
Silver	James Corbett	Shooting	Full bore rifle open singles	
Silver	Stewart Boswell; David Palmer	Squash	Men's doubles	
Silver	Ryan Napoleon	Swimming	Men's 400 metre freestyle	4 October
Silver	Emily Seebohm	Swimming	Women's 200 metre individual medley	4 October
Silver	Kenrick Monk	Swimming	Men's 200 metre freestyle	5 October
Silver	Hayden Stoeckel	Swimming	Men's 50 metre backstroke	5 October
Silver	Annabelle Williams	Swimming	Women's 50 metre freestyle S9	5 October
Silver	Leisel Jones	Swimming	Women's 50 metre breaststroke	5 October
Silver	Marieke Guehrer	Swimming	Women's 50 metre butterfly	5 October
Silver	Christian Sprenger	Swimming	Men's 100 metre breaststroke	6 October
Silver	Geoffrey Huegill	Swimming	Men's 50 metre butterfly	6 October
Silver	Emily Seebohm	Swimming	Women's 100 metre freestyle	6 October
Silver	Tessa Wallace	Swimming	Women's 200 metre breaststroke	6 October
Silver	Andrew Pasterfield	Swimming	Men's 100 metre freestyle S10	8 October
Silver	Brenton Rickard	Swimming	Men's 50 metre breaststroke	8 October
Silver	Kylie Palmer]	Swimming	Women's 400 metre freestyle	8 October
Silver	Samantha Marshall	Swimming	Women's 100 metre breaststroke	8 October
Silver	Samantha Hamill	Swimming	Women's 400 metre individual medley	9 October
Silver	Catherine Morrow	Table tennis	Women's wheelchair open singles	
Silver	Greg Jones	Tennis	Men's singles	
Silver	Olivia Rogowska; Jessica Moore	Tennis	Women's doubles	
Silver	Anastasia Rodionova; Paul Hanley	Tennis	Mixed doubles	
Silver	Ben Turner	Weightlifting	Men's 77 kg	
Silver	Seen Lee	Weightlifting	Women's 58 kg	
Silver	Emily Bensted	Wrestling	Women's freestyle 55 kg	7 October
Bronze	Cassie McCall	Archery	Women's compound individual	
Bronze	Dale Stevenson	Athletics	Men's shot put	
Bronze	Hamish MacDonald	Athletics	Men's shot put F32/34/52	
Bronze	Lisa Weightman	Athletics	Women's marathon	
Bronze	Tang He Tian; Kate Wilson-Smith	Badminton	Women's doubles	
Bronze	Scott Robertson	Diving	Men's 1 metre springboard	10 October
Bronze	Briony Cole; Anabelle Smith	Diving	Women's 10 metre synchro platform	10 October
Bronze	Jaele Patrick; Olivia Wright	Diving	Women's 3 metre synchro springboard	10 October
Bronze	Grant Nel	Diving	Men's 3 metre springboard	11 October
Bronze	Alexandra Croak	Diving	Women's 10 metre platform	11 October
Bronze	Jaele Patrick	Diving	Women's 3 metre springboard	13 October
Bronze	Chloe Hosking	Cycling	Women's road race	
Bronze	Luke Durbridge	Cycling	Men's road time trial	
Bronze	Michael Hepburn	Cycling	Men's individual pursuit	
Bronze	Emily Rosemond	Cycling	Women's individual sprint	
Bronze	Joshua Jefferis	Gymnastics	Men's artistic individual all-around	
Bronze	Prashanth Sellathurai	Gymnastics	Men's parallel bars	
Bronze	Georgia Bonora	Gymnastics	Women's artistic individual all-around	
Bronze	Ashleigh Brennan	Gymnastics	Women's floor	
Bronze	Kelsey Cottrell	Lawn bowls	Women's singles	
Bronze	Daniel Repacholi	Shooting	Men's 10m air pistol singles	
Bronze	David Chapman; Bruce Quick	Shooting	Men's 25m rapid fire pistol pairs	
Bronze	Dina Aspandiyarova	Shooting	Women's 10m air pistol singles	
Bronze	Warren Potent; David Clifton	Shooting	Men's 50m rifle prone pairs	
Bronze	Kasey Brown	Squash	Women's singles	
Bronze	Ryan Cuskelly; Cameron Pilley	Squash	Men's doubles	
Bronze	Kasey Brown; Donna Urquhart	Squash	Women's doubles	
Bronze	Thomas Fraser-Holmes	Swimming	Men's 200 metre freestyle	5 October
Bronze	Ashley Delaney	Swimming	Men's 50 metre backstroke	5 October
Bronze	Emily Seebohm	Swimming	Women's 50 metre butterfly	5 October
Bronze	Ashley Delaney	Swimming	Men's 200 metre backstroke	6 October
Bronze	Brenton Rickard	Swimming	Men's 100 metre breaststroke	6 October
Bronze	Sarah Katsoulis	Swimming	Women's 200 metre breaststroke	6 October
Bronze	Eamon Sullivan	Swimming	Men's 100 metre freestyle	7 October
Bronze	Ellie Cole	Swimming	Women's 100 metre freestyle S9	7 October
Bronze	Melissa Gorman	Swimming	Women's 800 metre freestyle	7 October
Bronze	Blake Cochrane	Swimming	Men's 100 metre freestyle S8	8 October
Bronze	Ashley Delaney	Swimming	Men's 100 metre backstroke	8 October
Bronze	Leith Brodie	Swimming	Men's 200 metre individual medley	8 October
Bronze	Emily Seebohm	Swimming	Women's 50 metre backstroke	8 October
Bronze	Emily Seebohm	Swimming	Women's 200 metre backstroke	8 October
Bronze	Christian Sprenger	Swimming	Men's 200 metre breaststroke	9 October
Bronze	Ellie Cole	Swimming	Women's 100 metre butterfly S9	9 October
Bronze	Eloise Amberger; Sarah Bombell	Synchronised swimming	Women's duet	
Bronze	Matthew Ebden	Tennis	Men's singles	
Bronze	Sally Peers	Tennis	Women's singles	
Bronze	Deborah Acason	Weightlifting	Women's +75kg	
Bronze	Hassan Shahsavan	Wrestling	Men's Greco-Roman 74 kg	5 October

Medals by sport
Sport	gold	silver	bronze	Total
Swimming	22	16	16	54
Cycling	14	3	4	21
Gymnastics	12	5	4	21
Athletics	11	6	3	20
Shooting	3	2	2	7
Tennis	3	3	2	8
Diving	2	7	6	15
Weightlifting	2	2	1	5
Hockey	2	0	0	2
Squash	1	1	3	5
Wrestling	1	1	1	3
Archery	1	0	1	2
Badminton	0	0	1	1
Boxing	0	0	0	0
Lawn bowls	0	3	1	4
Netball	0	1	0	1
Rugby sevens	0	1	0	1
Table tennis	0	1	0	1
Synchronised swimming	0	0	1	1
Total	74	52	46	172

== Archery ==
Australia's archery team consists of 12 archers over 8 events

=== Men ===
Athlete	Event	Ranking round		Round of 64	Round of 32	Round of 16	Quarterfinals	Semifinals	Final / BM	
Athlete	Event	Score	Seed	Opposition Score	Opposition Score	Opposition Score	Opposition Score	Opposition Score	Opposition Score	Rank
Matthew Gray	Men's recurve individual	649	12	BYE	Senevirathne (SRI); W 4–2	Duenas (CAN); W 4–0	Chu (MAS); W 6–4	Banerjee (IND); L 5–6	Talukdar (IND); L 4–6	4
Matthew Masonwells	Men's recurve individual	655	9	Bye	McGibbon (NIR); W 4–0	Rahim (MAS); W 4–2	Banerjee (IND); L 5–6	Did not advance		
Taylor Worth	Men's recurve individual	646	14	Bye	Laing (SCO); L 2–4	Did not advance				
Patrick Coghlan	Men's compound individual	698	9	Bye	Bockmuhl (NAM); W 4–0	De Wet (RSA); L 3–4	Did not advance			
Clint Freeman	Men's compound individual	688	20	Kemp (NFI); W 4–0	Benade (RSA); W 4–2	Kalmaru (WAL); L 2–4	Did not advance			
Robert Timms	Men's compound individual	697	10	Bye	Cameron (CAN); W 4–0	Fagan (CAN); W 4–2	Busby (ENG); L 3–7	Did not advance		
Matthew Gray; Matthew Masonwells; Taylor Worth	Men's team recurve	—N/a	5	—N/a			Canada; W 218–216	India; W 217–211	Malaysia; W 219–211	1st place, gold medalist(s)
Patrick Coghlan; Clint Freeman; Robert Timms	Men's compound team	—N/a	4	—N/a		Norfolk Island; W 234–209	Malaysia; W 232–220	England; L 224–228	South Africa; L 232–234	4

=== Women ===
Athlete	Event	Ranking round		Round of 32	Round of 16	Quarterfinals	Semifinals	Final / BM	
Athlete	Event	Score	Seed	Opposition Score	Opposition Score	Opposition Score	Opposition Score	Opposition Score	Rank
Deonne Bridger	Women's recurve individual	637	4	Bye	Loh (SIN); L 1–5	Did not advance			
Alexandra Feeney	Women's recurve individual	625	8	Bye	Devi (IND); W 4–2	Kumari (IND); L 0–6	Did not advance		
Dawn Nelson	Women's recurve individual	579	18	Ng (MAS); L 0–4	Did not advance				
Rebecca Darby	Women's compound individual	674	16	Hansdah (IND); W 4–0	Jones (CAN); L 0–4	Did not advance			
Fiona Hyde	Women's compound individual	686	6	Howells (WAL); W 4–0	Ishak (MAS); W 4–0	Brown (ENG); W 6–5	Hunt (ENG); L 6–2	McCall (AUS); L 3–7	4
Cassie McCall	Women's compound individual	676	13	George (IOM); W 5–1	Mitchell (NZL); W 4–0	McGowan (SCO); W 6–4	Jones (CAN); L 3–7	Hyde (AUS); W 7–3	3rd place, bronze medalist(s)
Deonne Bridger; Alexandra Feeney; Dawn Nelson	Women's recurve team	—N/a	3	—N/a		Canada; L 201–205	Did not advance		
Rebecca Darby; Fiona Hyde; Cassie McCall	Women's compound team	—N/a	4	—N/a		India; L 220–227	Did not advance		

== Athletics ==
=== Men's track ===
Athlete	Event	Heat		Quarterfinal		Semifinal		Final	
Athlete	Event	Result	Rank	Result	Rank	Result	Rank	Result	Rank
Aaron Rouge-Serret	100m	10.42	2 Q	10.29	2 Q	10.29	3 Q	10.30	5
Matt Davies	200m	21.54	4 q	21.42	7	Did not advance			
Joel Milburn	400m	46.72	2 Q	—N/a		45.79	2 Q	45.71	5
Ben Offereins	400m	46.85	2 Q	—N/a		46.11	3 q	46.00	7
Sean Wroe	400m	46.82	2 Q	—N/a		45.64	2 Q	45.46	2nd place, silver medalist(s)
Lachlan Renshaw	800m	1:50.74	2 Q	—N/a		1:47.26	5 q	DNS	
Mitchell Kealey	1500m	3:41.64	6 q	—N/a				3:44.47	11
Jeremy Roff	1500m	3:41.86	3 Q	—N/a				3:43.53	7
Collis Birmingham	5000m	—N/a						13:39.59	6
David McNeill	5000m	—N/a						13:47.40	8
Ben St Lawrence	5000m	—N/a						13:46.90	7
Collis Birmingham	10,000m	—N/a						29:35.65	9
Ben St Lawrence	10,000m	—N/a						28:49.47	7
Brendan Cole	400m hurdles	49.96	2 Q	—N/a				50.14	6
Youcef Abdi	3000m steeplechase	—N/a						8:33.20	6
Matt Davies; Jacob Groth; Patrick Johnson * Isaac Ntiamoah; Aaron Rouge-Serret	4 × 100 m relay	39.53	2 Q	—N/a				39.14	4
Brendan Cole; Joel Milburn; Kevin Moore * Ben Offereins; Sean Wroe	4 × 400 m relay	3:06.01	2 Q	—N/a				3:03.30	1st place, gold medalist(s)
Martin Dent	Marathon	—N/a						2:20:19	6
Jeffrey Hunt	Marathon	—N/a						2:25:03	13
Michael Shelley	Marathon	—N/a						2:15:28	2nd place, silver medalist(s)
Luke Adams	20km walk	—N/a						1:22:31	2nd place, silver medalist(s)
Chris Erickson	20km walk	—N/a						1:28:35 PB	8
Jared Tallent	20km walk	—N/a						1:22:18	1st place, gold medalist(s)

* : took part in heats only

=== Men's field ===
Athlete	Event	Qualification		Final	
Athlete	Event	Distance	Position	Distance	Position
Liam Zamel-Paez	High jump	2.16	=8 Q	2.15	9
Fabrice Lapierre	Long jump	8.00	1 Q	8.30 GR	1st place, gold medalist(s)
Chris Noffke	Long jump	7.89	3 q	7.68	6
Dale Stevenson	Shot put	19.34	3 Q	19.99	3rd place, bronze medalist(s)
Benn Harradine	Discus throw	61.98	1 Q	65.45	1st place, gold medalist(s)
Julian Wruck	Discus throw	56.42	8 q	56.69	8
Timothy Driesen	Hammer throw	—N/a		66.67	7
Simon Wardhaugh	Hammer throw	—N/a		68.15	5
Jarrod Bannister	Javelin throw	—N/a		81.71	1st place, gold medalist(s)
Steve Hooker	Pole vault	—N/a		5.60	1st place, gold medalist(s)

=== Women's track ===
Athlete	Event	Heat		Semifinal		Final	
Athlete	Event	Result	Rank	Result	Rank	Result	Rank
Melissa Breen	100m	11.76	4 Q	11.78	5	Did not advance	
Sally Pearson	100m	11.50	1 Q	11.28	1 Q	DQ	
Kaila McKnight	1500m	4:15.22	5	Did not advance			
Eloise Wellings	5000m	—N/a				16:11.97	5
Eloise Wellings	10,000m	—N/a				33:36.76	6
Sally Pearson	100m hurdles	13.02	1 Q	—N/a		12.67	1st place, gold medalist(s)
Lauren Boden	400m hurdles	56.72	2 Q	—N/a		56.31	4
Lauren Boden; Jody Henry; Pirrenee Steinert; Olivia Tauro	4 × 400 m relay	3:33.07	2 Q	—N/a		3:30.29	4
Lisa Flint	Marathon	—N/a				DNF	
Lisa Weightman	Marathon	—N/a				2:35:25	3rd place, bronze medalist(s)
Claire Tallent	20km walk	—N/a				1:36:55	2nd place, silver medalist(s)
Cheryl Webb	20km walk	—N/a				1:42:03	5

=== Women's field ===
Athlete	Event	Qualification		Final	
Athlete	Event	Distance	Position	Distance	Position
Ellen Pettitt	High jump	—N/a		1.78	11
Joanne Mirtschin	Shot put	—N/a		16.23	6
Karyne di Marco	Hammer throw	60.77	7 Q	62.38	6
Bronwyn Eagles	Hammer throw	60.37	8 q	63.43	5
Gabrielle Neighbour	Hammer throw	61.76	5 q	63.46	4
Kim Mickle	Javelin throw	—N/a		60.90	2nd place, silver medalist(s)
Kathryn Mitchell	Javelin throw	—N/a		54.25	5
Amanda Bisk	Pole vault	—N/a		4.25	6
Alana Boyd	Pole vault	—N/a		4.40	1st place, gold medalist(s)
Liz Parnov	Pole vault	—N/a		3.95	11

=== Paralympic athletics ===
Athlete	Event	Heats		Semifinal		Final	
Athlete	Event	Result	Rank	Result	Rank	Result	Rank
Gabriel Cole	Men's 100m T46	11.80	3 Q	11.48	3 Q	11.92	7
Heath Francis	Men's 100m T46	11.39	1 Q	27.64	8	Did not advance	
Simon Patmore	Men's 100m T46	11.43	2 Q	11.29	2 Q	11.14	1st place, gold medalist(s)
Richard Colman	Men's 1500m T54	—N/a				3:20.90	2nd place, silver medalist(s)
Kurt Fearnley	Men's 1500m T54	—N/a				3:19.86	1st place, gold medalist(s)
Jake Lappin	Men's 1500m T54	—N/a				3:24.26	7
Jodi Elkington	Women's 100m T37	—N/a				15.08	4
Damien Bowen	Men's shot put F32/34/52	—N/a				9.92	4
Hamish MacDonald	Men's shot put F32/34/52	—N/a				9.92	3rd place, bronze medalist(s)
Louise Ellery	Women's shot put F32-34/52/53	—N/a				6.17	1st place, gold medalist(s)
Brydee Moore	Women's shot put F32-34/52/53	—N/a				5.85	4

== Badminton ==
=== Men ===
Athlete	Event	Round of 64	Round of 32	Round of 16	Quarterfinal	Semifinal	Final / BM	
Athlete	Event	Opposition Score	Opposition Score	Opposition Score	Opposition Score	Opposition Score	Opposition Score	Rank
Nicholas Kidd	Men's singles	Mussagy (MOZ); W/O	Karunatatne (SRI); L 0–2	Did not advance				
Jeff Tho	Men's singles	Mohamed (MDV); W 2–0	Ssuuna (UGA); W 2–0	Liang (SIN); L 0–2	Did not advance			
Ross Smith; Glenn Warfe	Men's doubles	—N/a	Odera / Ruto (KEN); W 2–0	Chan / Hashim (MAS); L 0–2	Did not advance			

=== Women ===
Athlete	Event	Round of 64	Round of 32	Round of 16	Quarterfinal	Semifinal	Final / BM	
Athlete	Event	Opposition Score	Opposition Score	Opposition Score	Opposition Score	Opposition Score	Opposition Score	Rank
Leanne Choo	Women's singles	Gilmour (SCO); L 0–2	Did not advance					
Huang Chia-chi	Women's singles	Braimoh (NGR); W 2–0	Hettiarachchige (SRI); W 2–0	Fu (SIN); W 2–0	Hughes (SCO); L 0–2	Did not advance		
Leanne Choo; Renuga Vithi	Women's doubles	—N/a	Karjohn / Lewis (JAM); W 2–0	Balan / Mutatkar (IND); W 2–0	Yao / Sari (SIN); L 1–2	Did not advance		
Tang He Tian; Kate Wilson-Smith	Women's doubles	—N/a	Cooper / Gilmour (SCO); W 2–0	Bruce / Li (CAN); W 2–0	Barry / Haliday (NZL); W 2–0	Gutta / Ponnappa (IND); L 1–2	Wallwork / White (ENG); W 2–1	3rd place, bronze medalist(s)

=== Mixed ===
Athlete	Event	Round of 64	Round of 32	Round of 16	Quarterfinal	Semifinal	Final / BM	
Athlete	Event	Opposition Score	Opposition Score	Opposition Score	Opposition Score	Opposition Score	Opposition Score	Rank
Tang He Tian; Glenn Warfe	Mixed doubles	Thomas / Balan (IND); L 0–2	Did not advance					
Nicholas Kidd; Kate Wilson-Smith	Mixed doubles	Saputra / Neo (SIN); L 0–2	Did not advance					
Raj Veeran; Renuga Vithi	Mixed doubles	Karunathilaka / Hettiarachchige (SRI); W 2–0	Ponnappa / Kumar (IND); L 1–2	Did not advance				
Leanne Choo; Huang Chia-chi; Nicholas Kidd; Ross Smith; Tang He Tian; Jeff Tho; Raj Veeran; Renuga Vithi; Kate Wilson-Smith; Glenn Warfe	Mixed team	—N/a			Singapore; L 1–3	Did not advance		

== Boxing ==
Athlete	Event	Round of 32	Round of 16	Quarterfinals	Semifinals	Final	
Athlete	Event	Opposition Result	Opposition Result	Opposition Result	Opposition Result	Opposition Result	Rank
Andrew Moloney	Light flyweight	Bye	Kava (SOL); W RSC	Barnes (NIR); L 3–5	Did not advance		
Jason Moloney	Flyweight	Bye	Conlan (NIR); W 10–9	Oteng (BOT); L 3–5	Did not advance		
Ibrahim Balla	Bantamweight	Nketu (LES); W 5–2	McCullagh (NIR); L 2–7	Did not advance			
Luke Jackson	Lightweight	Lepoqo (LES); W 6–1	Nogeng (BOT); W 2–1	Stalker (ENG); L 2–7	Did not advance		
Luke Woods	Light welterweight	Donnelly (NIR); W 10–0	Colin (MRI); L 3–8	Did not advance			
Cameron Hammond	Welterweight	Ademuyiwa (NGR); W 7–2	Smith (ENG); L 2–4	Did not advance			
Damien Hooper	Middleweight	Agege (NRU); W 16–3	Ogogo (ENG); L 3–3	Did not advance			
Dane Mulivai	Light heavyweight	Bye	Ajibu (MAW); W 4–3	Makonjio (KEN); L 4–9	Did not advance		
Giancarlo Squillace	Heavyweight	Bye	Ward (NIR); L 4–7	Did not advance			
Alexey Mukhin	Super heavyweight	Henderson (SCO); W 7–1	Samota (IND); L 4–7	Did not advance			

== Cycling ==
=== Men's road ===
Athlete	Event	Time	Rank
Allan David	Road race	3:49:48	1st place, gold medalist(s)
Rohan Dennis	Road race	DNF	
Luke Durbridge	Road race	DNF	
Michael Matthews	Road race	DNF	
Travis Meyer	Road race	DNF	
Christopher Sutton	Road race	3:49:52	4
Rohan Dennis	Time trial	50:21.56	6
Luke Durbridge	Time trial	48:19.22	3rd place, bronze medalist(s)

=== Women's road ===
Athlete	Event	Time	Rank
Ruth Corset	Road race	2:49:58	32
Megan Dunn	Road race	2:49:38	18
Rochelle Gilmore	Road race	2:49:30	1st place, gold medalist(s)
Chloe Hosking	Road race	2:49:30	3rd place, bronze medalist(s)
Alexis Rhodes	Road race	2:49:38	27
Victoria Whitelaw	Road race	2:49:30	12
Ruth Corset	Time trial	41:30.88	12
Alexis Rhodes	Time trial	39:22.54	4
Victoria Whitelaw	Time trial	40:05.47	7

=== Men's track ===
Pursuit

Athlete	Event	Qualification		Final	
Athlete	Event	Time Speed (km/h)	Rank	Opposition Time	Rank
Jack Bobridge	Individual pursuit	4:14.845 GR (56.504 km/h)	1 Q	Sergent (NZL); W 4:17.495	1st place, gold medalist(s)
Michael Hepburn	Individual pursuit	4:19.598 (55.470 km/h)	3 q	Bewley (NZL); W OVL	3rd place, bronze medalist(s)
Jack Bobridge; Michael Freiberg; Michael Hepburn; Dale Parker	Team pursuit	4:00.285	1 Q	New Zealand; W 3:55.421 GR	1st place, gold medalist(s)

Sprint

Athlete	Event	Qualification		Quarterfinals	Semifinals	Final	
Athlete	Event	Time Speed (km/h)	Rank	Opposition Time	Opposition Time	Opposition Time	Rank
Daniel Ellis	Sprint	10.429 (69.038 km/h)	5	Did not advance			
Scott Sunderland	Sprint	10.151 (70.928 km/h)	2	Daniell (ENG); W 10.836; W 10.615	Dawkins (NZL); W 10.348; W 10.719	Perkins (AUS); L	2nd place, silver medalist(s)
Shane Perkins	Sprint	10.058 GR (71.584 km/h)	1	Edgar (SCO); W 10.623; W 10.433	Webster (NZL); W 10.607; W 10.687	Sunderland (AUS); W 10.455; W 10.310	1st place, gold medalist(s)
Daniel Ellis; Jason Niblett; Scott Sunderland	Team sprint	44.488	1 Q	—N/a		New Zealand; W 43.772 GR	1st place, gold medalist(s)

Time trial

Athlete	Event	Time	Rank
Scott Sunderland	1km time trial	1:01.411 GR	1st place, gold medalist(s)

Points race

Athlete	Event	Points	Extra Laps	Rank
Luke Durbridge	Points race	3	—	11
Cameron Meyer	Points race	29	3	1st place, gold medalist(s)

Keirin

Athlete	Event	1st round	Repechage	2nd round	Final
Athlete	Event	Rank	Rank	Rank	Rank
Jason Niblett	Keirin	2 Q	Bye	2 Q	4
Shane Perkins	Keirin	1 Q	Bye	REL	7

=== Women's track ===
Pursuit

Athlete	Event	Qualification		Final	
Athlete	Event	Time Speed (km/h)	Rank	Opposition Time Speed (km/h)	Rank
Ashlee Ankudinoff	Individual pursuit	3:45.656; 47.860	9	Did not advance	
Josephine Tomic	Individual pursuit	3:37.607; 49.550	5	Did not advance	

Sprint

Athlete	Event	Qualification		Quarterfinals	Semifinals	Final	
Athlete	Event	Time Speed (km/h)	Rank	Opposition Time Speed (km/h)	Opposition Time Speed (km/h)	Opposition Time Speed (km/h)	Rank
Kaarle McCulloch	Sprint	11.440 (62.937 km/h)	2	Joiner (SCO); W 12.446; W 12.282	James (WAL); L	Rosemond (AUS); L DQ	4
Anna Meares	Sprint	11.140 GR (64.631 km/h)	1	Mohan (IND); W 13.218; W 13.541	Rosemond (AUS); W 11.717; W 11.748	James (WAL); W 11.525; W 11.549	1st place, gold medalist(s)
Emily Rosemond	Sprint	11.504 (62.586 km/h)	4	Sullivan (CAN); W 11.816; W 12.549	Meares (AUS); L	McCulloch (AUS); W	3rd place, bronze medalist(s)
Kaarle McCulloch; Anna Meares	Team sprint	34.115	1 Q	—N/a		Scotland; W 33.811	1st place, gold medalist(s)

Time trial

Athlete	Event	Time	Rank
Kaarle McCulloch	500m time trial	34.780	2nd place, silver medalist(s)
Anna Meares	500m time trial	33.758 GR	1st place, gold medalist(s)

Points race

Athlete	Event	Points	Laps	Rank
Megan Dunn	Points race	25	1	1st place, gold medalist(s)
Belinda Goss	Points race	8	—	8
Josephine Tomic	Points race	2	—	10

== Diving ==
Australia's diving team consists of 12 divers

=== Men ===
Athlete	Event	Preliminaries		Final	
Athlete	Event	Points	Rank	Points	Rank
Matthew Mitcham	1m springboard	404.10	2 Q	441.00	2nd place, silver medalist(s)
Grant Nel	1m springboard	372.00	4 Q	366.70	8
Scott Robertson	1m springboard	358.70	8 Q	409.15	3rd place, bronze medalist(s)
Grant Nel	3m springboard	407.65	6 Q	456.55	3rd place, bronze medalist(s)
Scott Robertson	3m springboard	426.35	4 Q	417.45	8
Ethan Warren	3m springboard	472.55	2 Q	407.90	9
James Connor	10m platform	348.30	8 Q	408.50	9
Matthew Mitcham	10m platform	511.70	1 Q	509.15	2nd place, silver medalist(s)
Ethan Warren	10m platform	458.00	4 Q	445.25	5
Matthew Mitcham; Ethan Warren	Synchronised 3m springboard	—N/a		424.47	2nd place, silver medalist(s)
Grant Nel; Scott Robertson	Synchronised 3m springboard	—N/a		395.07	5
Matthew Mitcham; Ethan Warren	Synchronised 10m platform	—N/a		423.81	2nd place, silver medalist(s)

=== Women ===
Athlete	Event	Preliminaries		Final	
Athlete	Event	Points	Rank	Points	Rank
Jaele Patrick	1m springboard	270.65	4 Q	283.60	4
Sharleen Stratton	1m springboard	277.00	1 Q	299.15	2nd place, silver medalist(s)
Olivia Wright	1m springboard	256.20	6 Q	268.35	5
Jaele Patrick	3m springboard	314.05	3 Q	326.15	3rd place, bronze medalist(s)
Anabelle Smith	3m springboard	282.10	5 Q	324.30	4
Sharleen Stratton	3m springboard	348.60	1 Q	376.00	1st place, gold medalist(s)
Alexandra Croak	10m platform	345.85	3 Q	355.40	3rd place, bronze medalist(s)
Anabelle Smith	10m platform	346.50	2 Q	320.85	7
Melissa Wu	10m platform	330.75	5 Q	369.50	2nd place, silver medalist(s)
Briony Cole; Sharleen Stratton	Synchronised 3m springboard	—N/a		300.84	2nd place, silver medalist(s)
Jaele Patrick; Olivia Wright	Synchronised 3m springboard	—N/a		295.32	3rd place, bronze medalist(s)
Briony Cole; Anabelle Smith	Synchronised 10m platform	—N/a		325.50	3rd place, bronze medalist(s)
Alexandra Croak; Melissa Wu	Synchronised 10m platform	—N/a		335.76	1st place, gold medalist(s)

== Gymnastics ==
=== Men's artistic ===
Team

Athlete	Event	Final							
Athlete	Event	Apparatus						Total	Rank
Athlete	Event	F	PH	R	V	PB	HB	Total	Rank
Joshua Jefferis; Samuel Offord; Thomas Pichler; Luke Wiwatkowski	Team	43.950	38.900	44.350	46.500	42.700	42.650	259.050	1st place, gold medalist(s)

Individual

Athlete	Event	Apparatus						Total	Rank
Athlete	Event	F	PH	R	V	PB	HB	Total	Rank
Joshua Jeffries	All-around	13.800	12.750	14.850	15.250	14.150	13.950	84.750	3rd place, bronze medalist(s)
Samuel Offord	All-around	14.150	10.550	15.100	15.500	14.050	14.000	83.350	5
Thomas Pichler	All-around	14.500	11.200	14.300	15.300	13.850	12.700	81.850	7
Thomas Pichler	Floor	14.675	—N/a					14.675	1st place, gold medalist(s)
Luke Wiwatowski	Floor	12.875	—N/a					12.875	7
Prashanth Sellathurai	Pommel horse	—N/a	15.500	—N/a				15.500	1st place, gold medalist(s)
Samuel Offord	Rings	—N/a		14.825	—N/a			14.825	1st place, gold medalist(s)
Prashanth Sellathurai	Rings	—N/a		13.750	—N/a			13.750	6
Thomas Pichler	Vault	—N/a			14.725	—N/a		14.725	8
Joshua Jefferis	Parallel bars	—N/a				14.625	—N/a	14.625	1st place, gold medalist(s)
Prashanth Sellathurai	Parallel bars	—N/a				14.000	—N/a	14.000	3rd place, bronze medalist(s)
Samuel Offord	Horizontal bar	—N/a					13.550	13.550	4
Luke Wiwatowski	Horizontal bar	—N/a					12.725	12.725	7

=== Women's artistic ===
Team

Athlete	Event	Final					
Athlete	Event	Apparatus				Total	Rank
Athlete	Event	V	UB	BB	F	Total	Rank
Georgia Bonora; Ashleigh Brennan; Emily Little; Lauren Mitchell; Georgia Wheeler	Team	42.550	42.200	38.000	40.950	163.700	1st place, gold medalist(s)

Individual

Athlete	Event	Apparatus				Total	Rank
Athlete	Event	V	UB	BB	F	Total	Rank
Georgia Bonora	All-around	13.800	13.350	14.300	13.500	54.950	3rd place, bronze medalist(s)
Emily Little	All-around	14.850	13.750	13.750	13.500	55.850	2nd place, silver medalist(s)
Lauren Mitchell	All-around	14.650	13.900	15.200	14.450	58.200	1st place, gold medalist(s)
Georgia Bonora	Uneven bars	—N/a	13.925	—N/a		13.925	2nd place, silver medalist(s)
Lauren Mitchell	Uneven bars	—N/a	14.150	—N/a		14.150	1st place, gold medalist(s)
Lauren Mitchell	Balance beam	—N/a		14.475	—N/a	14.475	1st place, gold medalist(s)
Ashleigh Brennan	Floor	—N/a			13.425	13.425	3rd place, bronze medalist(s)
Lauren Mitchell	Floor	—N/a			13.925	13.925	2nd place, silver medalist(s)

=== Rhythmic ===
Gymnast	Event	Final	
Gymnast	Event	Points	Rank
Naazmi Johnston; Janine Murray; Danielle Prince	Team all-around	235.775	1st place, gold medalist(s)
Naazmi Johnston	Individual all-around	100.100	1st place, gold medalist(s)
Janine Murray	Individual all-around	91.375	7
Naazmi Johnston	Ball	25.100	1st place, gold medalist(s)
Janine Murray	Ball	23.250	6
Naazmi Johnston	Hoop	24.350	4
Naazmi Johnston	Ribbon	24.600	2nd place, silver medalist(s)
Janine Murray	Ribbon	23.550	5
Naazmi Johnston	Rope	25.100	2nd place, silver medalist(s)
Janine Murray	Rope	22.900	6

== Hockey ==
=== Men ===
Team	Pts	Pld	W	D	L	GF	GA	GD
Australia	12	4	4	0	0	15	2	+13
India	9	4	3	0	1	16	11	+5
Pakistan	6	4	2	0	2	11	9	+2
Malaysia	3	4	1	0	3	5	14	−9
Scotland	0	4	0	0	4	0	18	−18

6 October 2010
08:30

Australia	9–0	Scotland
Doerner 14' 38' 60'; Ciriello 16' 26'; Hammond 24'; Mitton 33'; Orchard 54'; Abbott 56'	Report

Umpires:
Andrew Kennedy (ENG)
Albert Marcano (TRI)

7 October 2010
16:00

India	2–5	Australia
Singh 12'; Sandeep 70+'	Report	Abbott 2'; Mitton 6'; Ockenden 48' de Young 54'; Turner 58'

Umpires:
Nathan Stagno (GIB)
Andrew Kennedy (ENG)

9 October 2010
10:30

Pakistan	0–1	Australia
	Report	Ciriello 33'

Umpires:
Richmond Attipoe (GHA)
Martin Madden (SCO)

10 October 2010
16:30

Australia	7–0	Malaysia
Doerner 5' 16' 47'; Orchard 11'; Turner 21'; Ciriello 45'; Ockenden 55'	Report

Umpires:
John Hrytsak (CAN)
Peter Wright (RSA)

==== Semi-final ====
12 October 2010
11:00

Australia	6–2	New Zealand
Orchard 25' 70'; Turner 28' 67'; Wilson 31'; Abbott 43'	Report	Hilton 51'; Burrows 60'

Umpires:
Martin Madden (SCO)
Satinder Kumar (IND)

==== Gold-medal match ====
14 October 2010
11:30

Australia	8–0	India
Wilson 19' 28'; Ciriello 21'; Doerner 34' 52'; Orchard 60'; Dwyer 66'; Turner 70'	Report

Umpires:
Peter Wright (RSA)
Nathan Stagno (GIB)

=== Women ===
Team	Pts	Pld	W	D	L	GF	GA	GD
Australia	10	4	3	1	0	19	4	+15
South Africa	7	4	2	1	1	16	5	+11
India	7	4	2	1	1	12	4	+8
Scotland	4	4	1	1	2	10	9	+1
Trinidad and Tobago	0	4	0	0	4	1	36	−35

5 October 2010
13:00

Australia	11–0	Trinidad and Tobago
Eastham 14'; Hurtz 19' 48' 63'; Blyth 27'; Liddelow 30'; Arrold 37'; Rivers 41' 46'; Taylor 50'; Nelson 60'	Report

Umpires:
Elena Eskina (RUS)
Anupama Puchimanda (IND)

6 October 2010
13:30

Australia	2–1	India
Liddelow 11'; Rivers 59'	Report	Rampal 69'

Umpires:
Kelly Hudson (NZL)
Frances Block (ENG)

8 October 2010
08:30

Australia	1–1	South Africa
Hurtz 8'	Report	Damons 31'

Umpires:
Chieko Soma (JPN)
Frances Block (ENG)

9 October 2010
13:30

Australia	5–2	Scotland
Hollywood 3'; Rivers 12'; Arrold 30' 56'; Nelson 43'	Report	Judge 50'; Robertson 54'

Umpires:
Chieko Soma (JPN)
Nor Piza Hassan (MAS)

==== Semi-final ====
11 October 2010
11:00

Australia	1–0	England
Blyth 38'	Report

Umpires:
Michelle Joubert (RSA)
Chieko Soma (JPN)

==== Gold-medal match ====
13 October 2010
13:00

Australia	2–2 (a.e.t.)	New Zealand
Arrold 9'; Nelson 59'	Report	S. Harrison 48'; Eshuis 70'
Penalties
Nelson (penalty shoot-out scored); Rivers (penalty shoot-out scored); Blyth (penalty shoot-out missed); Eastham (penalty shoot-out scored); Arrold (penalty shoot-out scored)	4–2	(penalty shoot-out missed) Glynn; (penalty shoot-out missed) Forgesson; (penalty shoot-out scored) Michelsen; (penalty shoot-out scored) Sharland

Umpires:
Chieko Soma (JPN)
Frances Block (ENG)

== Lawn Bowls ==
Player	Event	Round robin W/L	Rank	Quarterfinal	Semifinal	Final	Rank
Leif Selby	Men's singles	6 / 3	2 Q	Forsyth (NZL); W 2–1	Kelly (NIR); W 2–0	Weale (WAL); L 1–2	2nd place, silver medalist(s)
Mark Berghofer; Aron Sherriff	Men's pairs	10 / 1	2 Q	Airey / King (ENG); L 2–0	Did not advance		
Mark Casey; Wayne Turley; Brett Wilkie	Men's triples	7 / 3	2 Q	Malaysia; W 2–0	England; W 2–1	South Africa; L 1–2	2nd place, silver medalist(s)
Kelsey Cottrell	Women's singles	9 / 0	1 Q	Bye	Smith (NZL); W 2–1	Ahmad (MAS); W 2–1	3rd place, bronze medalist(s)
Lynsey Armitage; Natasha Van Eldik	Women's pairs	7 / 3	1 Q	Bye	Falkner / Monkhouse (ENG); L 2–0	Butten / Smith (WAL); L 1–2	4
Claire Duke; Julie Keegan; Sharyn Renshaw	Women's triples	6 / 2	2 Q	Malaysia; W 2–0	India; W 2–0	South Africa; L 1–2	2nd place, silver medalist(s)

== Netball ==
Pos	Team	Pld	W	D	L	GF	GA	G%	Pts
1	Australia	5	5	0	0	385	172	223.8	10
2	Jamaica	5	4	0	1	362	217	166.8	8
3	Malawi	5	3	0	2	293	262	111.8	6
4	Trinidad and Tobago	5	2	0	3	249	275	90.5	4
5	Samoa	5	1	0	4	246	291	84.5	2
6	India	5	0	0	4	123	441	27.9	0

- Goal percentage (G%) = 100 × GF/GA. Accurate to one decimal place.
- Highlighted teams advanced to the medal playoffs; other teams contested classification matches.

4 October; 09:30 (IST)	Report	Australia	76–39	Samoa	Thyagaraj Sports Complex; Attendance: 58; Umpires: Amanda Nottingham, Sylvester Campbell; Reserve umpire: Anne Abraitis
4 October; 09:30 (IST)	Report	Cox 19/22 (86%); McMahon 15/17 (88%); Medhurst 17/17 (100%); Pratley 25/27 (93%)		Faasavalu 13/24 (54%); Fuimaono 9/9 (100%); Langi 17/21 (81%)	Thyagaraj Sports Complex; Attendance: 58; Umpires: Amanda Nottingham, Sylvester Campbell; Reserve umpire: Anne Abraitis

5 October; 17:00 (IST)	Report	Australia	113–18	India	Thyagaraj Sports Complex; Umpires: Jonathan Bredin, Dalton Hinds; Reserve umpire: Judith Groves
5 October; 17:00 (IST)	Report	Cox 27/28 (96%); McMahon 22/23 (96%); Medhurst 25/26 (96%); Pratley 39/42 (93%)		H. Kaur 6/10 (60%); K. Kaur 7/8 (88%); Tehlan 5/5 (100%)	Thyagaraj Sports Complex; Umpires: Jonathan Bredin, Dalton Hinds; Reserve umpire: Judith Groves

7 October; 15:00 (IST)	Report	Australia	60–46	Jamaica	Thyagaraj Sports Complex; Umpires: Amanda Nottingham, Judith Groves; Reserve umpire: Jonathan Bredin
7 October; 15:00 (IST)	Report	McMahon 26/30 (87%); Medhurst 34/35 (97%)		R. Aiken 25/26 (96%); Forbes 12/17 (71%); Fowler 6/6 (100%); Griffiths 3/4 (75%)	Thyagaraj Sports Complex; Umpires: Amanda Nottingham, Judith Groves; Reserve umpire: Jonathan Bredin

8 October; 15:00 (IST)	Report	Malawi	35–74	Australia	Thyagaraj Sports Complex; Umpires: Annie Kloppers, Jonathan Bredin; Reserve umpire: Dalton Hinds
8 October; 15:00 (IST)	Report	Kumwenda 21/26 (81%); Simtowe 4/5 (80%); Waya 10/18 (56%)		Cox 38/43 (88%); Pratley 36/39 (92%)	Thyagaraj Sports Complex; Umpires: Annie Kloppers, Jonathan Bredin; Reserve umpire: Dalton Hinds

10 October; 21:00 (IST)	Report	Australia	62–34	Trinidad and Tobago	Thyagaraj Sports Complex; Umpires: Annie Kloppers, Jonathan Bredin; Reserve umpire: Gary Burgess
10 October; 21:00 (IST)	Report	Cox 15/22 (68%); McMahon 18/24 (75%); Medhurst 12/12 (100%); Pratley 17/21 (81%)		Barker 16/17 (94%); Cooper 2/4 (50%); Wilson 16/22 (73%)	Thyagaraj Sports Complex; Umpires: Annie Kloppers, Jonathan Bredin; Reserve umpire: Gary Burgess

12 October; 13:00 (IST)	Report	Australia	51–45	England	Thyagaraj Sports Complex; Umpires: Sylvester Campbell, Amanda Nottingham; Reserve umpire: Jonathan Bredin
12 October; 13:00 (IST)	Report	McMahon 20/23 (87%); Medhurst 31/33 (94%)		Brownfield 4/5 (80%); Cookey 23/23 (100%); Harten 18/25 (72%)	Thyagaraj Sports Complex; Umpires: Sylvester Campbell, Amanda Nottingham; Reserve umpire: Jonathan Bredin

14 October; 13:30 (IST)	Report	Australia	64–66	New Zealand	Thyagaraj Sports Complex; Umpires: Gary Burgess, Sylvester Campbell; Reserve umpire: Judith Groves
14 October; 13:30 (IST)	Report	Cox 20/26 (77%); McMahon 30/34 (88%); Medhurst 14/18 (78%)		Tutaia 41/50 (82%) van Dyk 25/29 (86%)	Thyagaraj Sports Complex; Umpires: Gary Burgess, Sylvester Campbell; Reserve umpire: Judith Groves

== Rugby sevens ==
Team	Pld	W	D	L	PF	PA	PD	Pts
England	3	3	0	0	135	26	+109	9
Australia	3	2	0	1	94	26	+68	7
Uganda	3	1	0	2	35	93	−58	5
Sri Lanka	3	0	0	3	17	136	−119	3

11 October 2010
10:50

Australia	33–0	Uganda

Delhi University, New Delhi

11 October 2010
14:26

Australia	42–5	Sri Lanka

Delhi University, New Delhi

11 October 2010
17:54

England	21–19	Australia

Delhi University, New Delhi

=== Gold-medal bracket ===
Quarter-finals
12 October 10:38 – New Delhi
New Zealand	31
Wales	10
12 October 11:00 – New Delhi
England	7
Samoa	5
12 October 11:22 – New Delhi
Kenya	5
Australia	27
12 October 11:44 – New Delhi
South Africa	10
Scotland	7

Semi-finals
12 October 14:28 – New Delhi
New Zealand	33
England	12
12 October 14:50 – New Delhi
Australia	17
South Africa	7

Final
12 October 16:50 – New Delhi
New Zealand	24
Australia	17
Third place
12 October 16:20 – New Delhi
South Africa	17
England	14

== Shooting ==
=== Men ===
Athlete	Event	Final	
Athlete	Event	Total	Rank
Michael Diamond	Men's trap singles	146	2nd place, silver medalist(s)
Adam Vella	Men's trap singles	144	4
Russell Mark	Men's double trap singles	183	5
Clive Barton	Men's skeet singles	142	6
Daniel Repacholi	10m air pistol	674.0	3rd place, bronze medalist(s)
Edwin Gouw	10m air rifle	692.9	5
Tyren Vitler	10m air rifle	690.4	8
Michelangelo Giustiniano	25m centre fire pistol	574	5
David Moore	25m centre fire pistol	567	10
David Chapman	25m rapid fire pistol	755.6	6
David Moore	25m standard pistol	547	10
Christopher Roberts	25m standard pistol	549	8
David Moore	50m pistol	630.0	8
Benjamin Burge	50m rifle 3 positions	1234.2	6
Warren Potent	50m rifle prone	695.4	2nd place, silver medalist(s)
Michael Diamond; Adam Vella	Trap pairs	198 GR	1st place, gold medalist(s)
Nicholas Kirley; Russell Mark	Double trap pairs	184	4
Clive Barton; Anthony Sottosanti	Skeet pairs	184	6
Daniel Repacholi; Christophe Roberts	10m air pistol pairs	1137	4
Edwin Gouw; Tyren Vitler	10m air rifle pairs	1170	5
Michelangelo Giustiniano; David Moore	25m centre fire pistol pairs	1117	11
David Chapman; Bruce Quick	25m rapid fire pistol pairs	1125	3rd place, bronze medalist(s)
David Moore; Christopher Roberts	25m standard pistol pairs	1096	5
David Moore; Bruce Quick	50m pistol pairs	1080	4
Benjamin Burge; William Godward	50m rifle 3 positions pairs	2277	5
David Clifton; Warren Potent	50m rifle prone pairs	1174	3rd place, bronze medalist(s)

=== Women ===
Athlete	Event	Final	
Athlete	Event	Total	Rank
Dina Aspandiyarova	10m air pistol	478	3rd place, bronze medalist(s)
Linda Ryan	25m pistol	769.4	5
Lalita Yauhleuskaya	25m pistol	772.0	4
Alethea Sedgman	50m rifle 3 positions	676.0	1st place, gold medalist(s)
Robyn van Nus	50m rifle 3 positions	668.5	4
Deborah Lowe	50m rifle prone	572	18
Susannah Smith	50m rifle prone	590	5
Stacy Roiall; Laetisha Scanlan	Trap pairs	93 GR	1st place, gold medalist(s)
Dina Aspandiyarova; Pamela McKenzie	10m air pistol pairs	759	2nd place, silver medalist(s)
Alethea Sedgman; Robyn van Nus	10m air rifle pairs	780	6
Linda Ryan; Lalita Yauhleuskaya	25m pistol pairs	1146	2nd place, silver medalist(s)
Alethea Sedgman; Robyn van Nus	50m rifle 3 positions pairs	1127	4
Deborah Lowe; Susannah Smith	50m rifle prone pairs	1158	6

== Squash ==
=== Men ===
Athlete	Event	Round of 64	Round of 32	Round of 16	Quarterfinals	Semifinals	Final / BM	
Athlete	Event	Opposition Score	Opposition Score	Opposition Score	Opposition Score	Opposition Score	Opposition Score	Rank
Stewart Boswell	Men's singles	Small (SCO); W 3–0	Sandhu (IND); W 3–0	Mehboob (PAK); W 3–0	Barker (ENG); L 1–3	Did not advance		
Ryan Cuskelly	Men's singles	Jangra (IND); W 3–0	Hindle (MLT); W 3–1	Pilley (AUS); L 0–3	Did not advance			
David Palmer	Men's singles	Taulo (MAW); W 3–0	McDougall (CAN); W 3–0	Ong (MAS); W 3–0	Willstrop (ENG); L 2–3	Did not advance		
Cameron Pilley	Men's singles	Chapman (IVB); W 3–0	Suchde (IND); W 3–1	Cuskelly (AUS); W 3–0	Matthew (ENG); L 0–3	Did not advance		
Stewart Boswell; David Palmer	Men's doubles	—N/a			Paterson / Small (SCO); W 2–0	Clyne / Leitch (SCO); W 2–0	Grant / Matthew (ENG); L 1–2	2nd place, silver medalist(s)
Ryan Cuskelly; Cameron Pilley	Men's doubles	—N/a			Grayson / Knight (NZL); W 2–0	Grant / Matthew (ENG); L 0–2	Clyne / Leitch (SCO); W 2–0	3rd place, bronze medalist(s)

=== Women ===
Athlete	Event	Round of 32	Round of 16	Quarterfinals	Semifinals	Final / BM	
Athlete	Event	Opposition Score	Opposition Score	Opposition Score	Opposition Score	Opposition Score	Rank
Kasey Brown	Women's singles	Ranieri (CAN); W 3–0	Arnold (MAS); W 3–1	Perry (NIR); W 3–2	David (MAS); L 0–3	Waters (ENG); W W/O	3rd place, bronze medalist(s)
Lisa Camilleri	Women's singles	Gillen-Buchert (SCO); W 3–0	Perry (NIR); L 0–3	Did not advance			
Amelia Pittock	Women's singles	Hawkes (NZL); L 0–3	Did not advance				
Donna Urquhart	Women's singles	Fernandes (GUY); W 3–0	King (NZL); L 1–3	Did not advance			
Kasey Brown; Donna Urquhart	Women's doubles	—N/a		Arnold / Wern (MAS); W 2–0	Duncalf / Massaro (ENG); L 1–2	Camilleri / Pittock (AUS); W 2–1	3rd place, bronze medalist(s)
Lisa Camilleri; Amelia Pittock	Women's doubles	—N/a		Aitken / Gillen-Buchert (SCO); W 2–0	Hawkes / King (NZL); L 1–2	Brown / Urquhart (AUS); L 1–2	4

=== Mixed ===
Athlete	Event	Quarterfinals	Semifinals	Final / BM	
Athlete	Event	Opposition Score	Opposition Score	Opposition Score	Rank
Kasey Brown; Cameron Pilley	Mixed doubles	Duncalf / Willstrop (ENG); W 2–1	Palmer / Urquhart (AUS); W 2–0	King / Knight (NZL); W 2–1	1st place, gold medalist(s)
David Palmer; Donna Urquhart	Mixed doubles	Aitken / Leitch (SCO); W 2–0	Brown / Pilley (AUS); L 0–2	David / Ong (MAS); L 0–2	4

== Swimming ==
Australia's swimming team consists of 53 swimmers over 44 events.

=== Men ===
Athlete	Event	Heat		Semifinal		Final	
Athlete	Event	Time	Rank	Time	Rank	Time	Rank
Ashley Callus	50m freestyle	22.46	4 Q	DQ		Did not advance	
Cameron Prosser	50m freestyle	22.38	3 Q	22.28	2 Q	22.46	5
Eamon Sullivan	50m freestyle	22.65	6 Q	22.36	2 Q	22.51	=6
Tommaso D'Orsogna	100m freestyle	49.89	3 Q	49.52	3 Q	49.40	6
Kyle Richardson	100m freestyle	49.93	2 Q	49.60	4 Q	49.26	5
Eamon Sullivan	100m freestyle	49.79	2 Q	48.66	1 Q	48.69	3rd place, bronze medalist(s)
David Ffrost	200m freestyle	1:49.65	3	Did not advance			
Thomas Fraser-Holmes	200m freestyle	1:48.63	1 Q	—N/a		1:48.22	3rd place, bronze medalist(s)
Kenrick Monk	200m freestyle	1:48.84	2 Q	—N/a		1:47.90	2nd place, silver medalist(s)
Robert Hurley	400m freestyle	3:57.46	5	Did not advance			
Kenrick Monk	400m freestyle	DNS		Did not advance			
Ryan Napoleon	400m freestyle	3:51.06	1 Q	—N/a		3:48.59	2nd place, silver medalist(s)
Robert Hurley	1500m freestyle	DNS		Did not advance			
Ryan Napoleon	1500m freestyle	15:37.45	3 Q	—N/a		15:28.70	6
Daniel Arnamnart	50m backstroke	25.52	2 Q	25.39	3 Q	25.66	6
Ashley Delaney	50m backstroke	25.94	7 Q	25.04	1 Q	25.21	3rd place, bronze medalist(s)
Hayden Stoeckel	50m backstroke	25.56	3 Q	25.27	2 Q	25.08	2nd place, silver medalist(s)
Daniel Arnamnart	100m backstroke	55.63	6 Q	55.66	5	Did not advance	
Ashley Delaney	100m backstroke	55.35	5 Q	54.31 GR	1 Q	54.51	3rd place, bronze medalist(s)
Ashley Delaney	200m backstroke	2:00.44	2 Q	—N/a		1:58.18	3rd place, bronze medalist(s)
Hayden Stoeckel	200m backstroke	2:01.76	4	Did not advance			
Brenton Rickard	50m breaststroke	28.46	2 Q	28.11	1 Q	27.67	2nd place, silver medalist(s)
Christian Sprenger	50m breaststroke	28.94	7 Q	28.10	3 Q	27.87	4
Craig Calder	100m breaststroke	1:03.47	4 Q	1:03.60	7	Did not advance	
Brenton Rickard	100m breaststroke	1:01.91	1 Q	1:01.39	4 Q	1:00.46	3rd place, bronze medalist(s)
Christian Sprenger	100m breaststroke	1:01.61 GR	1 Q	1:00.45 GR	1 Q	1:00.29	2nd place, silver medalist(s)
Craig Calder	200m breaststroke	2:14.01	3 Q	—N/a		2:13.39	7
Brenton Rickard	200m breaststroke	2:13.91	3 Q	—N/a		2:10.89 GR	1st place, gold medalist(s)
Christian Sprenger	200m breaststroke	2:13.50	2 Q	—N/a		2:11.44	3rd place, bronze medalist(s)
Geoff Huegill	50m butterfly	23.66	2 Q	23.62	1 Q	23.37	2nd place, silver medalist(s)
Andrew Lauterstein	50m butterfly	24.63	6 Q	24.17	3 Q	23.88	5
Mitchell Patterson	50m butterfly	23.92	4 Q	23.77	2 Q	23.65	4
Geoff Huegill	100m butterfly	52.87	1 Q	52.53	2 Q	51.69 GR	1st place, gold medalist(s)
Chris Wright	100m butterfly	53.89	2 Q	53.04	3 Q	52.66	4
Nick D'Arcy	200m butterfly	1:58.48	4	Did not advance			
Jayden Hadler	200m butterfly	1:57.90	2 Q	—N/a		1:57.37	5
Chris Wright	200m butterfly	1:57.78	1 Q	—N/a		1:57.32	4
Leith Brodie	200m individual medley	2:01.41	1 Q	—N/a		2:00.00	3rd place, bronze medalist(s)
Tommaso D'Orsogna	200m individual medley	2:06.38	5	Did not advance			
Thomas Fraser-Holmes	200m individual medley	2:03.32	3 Q	—N/a		2:02.65	7
Thomas Fraser-Holmes	400m individual medley	4:22.39	3 Q	—N/a		4:17.99	5
Jayden Hadler	400m individual medley	4:27.73	5	Did not advance			
Tommaso D'Orsogna; James Magnussen; Cameron Prosser; Kyle Richardson	4 × 100 m freestyle relay	3:15.18	1 Q	—N/a		3:13.92 GR	1st place, gold medalist(s)
Leith Brodie * Nicholas Ffrost; Thomas Fraser-Holmes; Kenrick Monk; Ryan Napoleon	4 × 200 m freestyle relay	7:22.47	1 Q	—N/a		7:10.29 GR	1st place, gold medalist(s)
Ashley Delaney; Geoff Huegill; Kyle Richardson; Christian Sprenger	4 × 100 m medley relay	3:41.91	1 Q	—N/a		3:33.15 GR	1st place, gold medalist(s)

* : took part in heats only.

=== Women ===
Athlete	Event	Heat		Semifinal		Final	
Athlete	Event	Time	Rank	Time	Rank	Time	Rank
Marieke Guehrer	50m freestyle	25.55	3 Q	25.35	3 Q	25.26	5
Yolane Kukla	50m freestyle	25.47	2 Q	25.02	1 Q	24.86	1st place, gold medalist(s)
Alice Mills	50m freestyle	25.73	7 Q	25.63	4 Q	25.50	6
Alicia Coutts	100m freestyle	55.06	1 Q	54.62	1 Q	54.09	1st place, gold medalist(s)
Yolane Kukla	100m freestyle	55.92	2 Q	55.96	5	Did not advance	
Emily Seebohm	100m freestyle	55.30	1 Q	55.39	3 Q	54.30	2nd place, silver medalist(s)
Bronte Barratt	200m freestyle	2:00.37	3	Did not advance			
Blair Evans	200m freestyle	1:59.25	1 Q	—N/a		1:58.96	6
Kylie Palmer	200m freestyle	1:58.71	1 Q	—N/a		1:57.50	1st place, gold medalist(s)
Bronte Barratt	400m freestyle	4:17.06	3	Did not advance			
Katie Goldman	400m freestyle	4:14.09	3	Did not advance			
Kylie Palmer	400m freestyle	4:11.48	3 Q	—N/a		4:07.85	2nd place, silver medalist(s)
Blair Evans	800m freestyle	8:39.49	3 Q	—N/a		8:39.66	5
Katie Goldman	800m freestyle	8:38.91	3 Q	—N/a		8:38.65	4
Melissa Gorman	800m freestyle	8:38.16	2 Q	—N/a		8:32.37	3rd place, bronze medalist(s)
Sophie Edington	50m backstroke	29.07	5 Q	28.53	3 Q	28.00 GR	1st place, gold medalist(s)
Grace Loh	50m backstroke	28.78	3 Q	28.72	4 Q	28.66	5
Emily Seebohm	50m backstroke	28.72	2 Q	28.03 GR	1 Q	28.33	3rd place, bronze medalist(s)
Sophie Edington	100m backstroke	1:01.88	3 Q	1:00.80	2 Q	1:00.81	4
Belinda Hocking	100m backstroke	1:00.87	1 Q	1:00.71	1 Q	1:00.81	4
Emily Seebohm	100m backstroke	1:00.90	2 Q	1:00.28 GR	1 Q	59.79 GR	1st place, gold medalist(s)
Belinda Hocking	200m backstroke	2:11.79	1 Q	—N/a		2:09.01	4
Meagen Nay	200m backstroke	2:09.53 GR	1 Q	—N/a		2:07.56 GR	1st place, gold medalist(s)
Emily Seebohm	200m backstroke	2:10.01	2 Q	—N/a		2:08.28	3rd place, bronze medalist(s)
Leisel Jones	50m breaststroke	31.04	2 Q	31.29	1 Q	31.10	2nd place, silver medalist(s)
Sarah Katsoulis	50m breaststroke	31.50	4 Q	31.58	3 Q	31.43	4
Leiston Pickett	50m breaststroke	30.57	1 Q	30.74	1 Q	30.84	1st place, gold medalist(s)
Leisel Jones	100m breaststroke	1:09.22	4 Q	1:07.73	1 Q	1:05.84	1st place, gold medalist(s)
Sarah Katsoulis	100m breaststroke	1:08.43	3 Q	1:08.47	1 Q	1:08.49	4
Samantha Marshall	100m breaststroke	1:08.41	2 Q	1:07.95	2 Q	1:07.97	2nd place, silver medalist(s)
Leisel Jones	200m breaststroke	2:28.57	1 Q	—N/a		2:25.38	1st place, gold medalist(s)
Sarah Katsoulis	200m breaststroke	2:28.29	1 Q	—N/a		2:25.92	3rd place, bronze medalist(s)
Tessa Wallace	200m breaststroke	2:28.89	2 Q	—N/a		2:25.60	2nd place, silver medalist(s)
Marieke Guehrer	50m butterfly	26.64	1 Q	26.07 GR	1 Q	26.27	2nd place, silver medalist(s)
Yolane Kukla	50m butterfly	27.06	2 Q	26.22	2 Q	26.41	4
Emily Seebohm	50m butterfly	26.52	1 Q	26.62	2 Q	26.29	3rd place, bronze medalist(s)
Alicia Coutts	100m butterfly	59.49	2 Q	58.46	2 Q	57.53	1st place, gold medalist(s)
Felicity Galvez	100m butterfly	59.28	2 Q	58.61	3 Q	58.83	5
Yolane Kukla	100m butterfly	1:00.66	5 Q	59.14	4 Q	58.47	4
Samantha Hamill	200m butterfly	2:09.69	2 Q	—N/a		2:07.84	4
Felicity Galvez	200m butterfly	2:13.57	4 Q	—N/a		2:13.19	8
Jessicah Schipper	200m butterfly	2:08.70	1 Q	—N/a		2:07.04	1st place, gold medalist(s)
Alicia Coutts	200m individual medley	2:13.86	1 Q	—N/a		2:09.70	1st place, gold medalist(s)
Emily Seebohm	200m individual medley	2:14.32	1 Q	—N/a		2:10.83	2nd place, silver medalist(s)
Blair Evans	400m individual medley	4:44.96	2 Q	—N/a		4:41.51	4
Samantha Hamill	400m individual medley	4:47.08	2 Q	—N/a		4:39.45	2nd place, silver medalist(s)
Alicia Coutts; Felicity Galvez; Marieke Guehrer; Emily Seebohm	4 × 100 m freestyle relay	—N/a				3:36.36 GR	1st place, gold medalist(s)
Bronte Barratt; Blair Evans; Meagen Nay; Kylie Palmer	4 × 200 m freestyle relay	—N/a				7:53.71 GR	1st place, gold medalist(s)
Alicia Coutts; Leisel Jones; Jessicah Schipper; Emily Seebohm	4 × 100 m medley relay	—N/a				3:56.99	1st place, gold medalist(s)

=== Paralympic swimming ===
Athlete	Event	Heat		Final	
Athlete	Event	Time	Rank	Time	Rank
Ben Austin	Men's 50m freestyle S9	27.68	2 Q	27.53	4
Blake Cochrane	Men's 50m freestyle S9	27.81	2 Q	27.68	5
Matthew Cowdrey	Men's 50m freestyle S9	25.66	1 Q	25.33 WR	1st place, gold medalist(s)
Ben Austin	Men's 100m freestyle S8	—N/a		1:00.44	1st place, gold medalist(s)
Blake Cochrane	Men's 100m freestyle S8	—N/a		1:00.95	3rd place, bronze medalist(s)
Matthew Cowdrey	Men's 100m freestyle S10	56.61	2 Q	55.57	4
Andrew Pasterfield	Men's 100m freestyle S10	55.16	1 Q	55.04	2nd place, silver medalist(s)
Ellie Cole	Women's 50m freestyle S9	31.11	2 Q	30.23	4
Annabelle Williams	Women's 50m freestyle S9	30.03	1 Q	29.42	2nd place, silver medalist(s)
Ellie Cole	Women's 100m freestyle S9	1:06.98	2 Q	1:05.20	3rd place, bronze medalist(s)
Annabelle Williams	Women's 100m freestyle S9	1:07.25	2 Q	1:05.82	4
Ellie Cole	Women's 100m butterfly S9	—N/a		1:14.04	3rd place, bronze medalist(s)
Annabelle Williams	Women's 100m butterfly S9	—N/a		1:14.07	4

== Synchronized swimming ==
Australia's synchronized swimming team consists of 3 swimmers over 2 events.

Events	Swimmer(s)	Technical Routine		Free Routine		Total Points	Rank
Events	Swimmer(s)	Points	Rank	Points	Rank	Total Points	Rank
Solo	Tarren Otte	39.334	5	39.584	4	78.918	4
Duet	Eloise Amberger; Sarah Bombell	39.250	3	39.750	3	79.000	Bronze medal

== Table tennis ==
=== Men ===
Athlete	Event	Preliminary round			Round 1	Round 2	Round 3	Quarterfinals	Semifinals	Final / BM	
Athlete	Event	Opposition Result	Opposition Result	Rank	Opposition Result	Opposition Result	Opposition Result	Opposition Result	Opposition Result	Opposition Result	Rank
Robert Frank	Men's singles	Naseem (MAS); W 4–0	Wa (MRI); W 4–0	1 Q	Jenkins (WAL); L 3–4	Did not advance					
Simon Gerada	Men's singles	Benjamin (VAN); W 4–0	Simon (KEN); W 4–0	1 Q	Ho (CAN); W 4–2	Ma (SIN); L 2–4	Did not advance				
Justin Han	Men's singles	Hunte (SVG); W 4–0	Barao (KIR); W 4–0	1 Q	David (GUY); W 4–1	Amalraj (IND); L 1–4	Did not advance				
William Henzell	Men's singles	Bye				Thérien (CAN); W 4–1	Roy (IND); L 3–4	Did not advance			
Nam Ho Oh	Men's singles	Tan (MAS); W 4–1	Johnny (KIR); W 4–0	1 Q	Thomas (WAL); W 4–0	Saha (IND); L 0–4	Did not advance				

=== Women ===
Athlete	Event	Preliminary round				Round 1	Round 2	Round 3	Quarterfinals	Semifinals	Final / BM	
Athlete	Event	Opposition Result	Opposition Result	Opposition Result	Rank	Opposition Result	Opposition Result	Opposition Result	Opposition Result	Opposition Result	Opposition Result	Rank
Peri Campbell-Innes	Women's singles	Thakkar (IND); W W/O	Felix (BAR); W 4–1	—N/a	1 Q	Fan (MAS); L 1–4	Did not advance					
Aomin Chen	Women's singles	Mohamed (MDV); W 4–1	Lukaaya (UGA); W 4–1	Chivers (GGY); W 4–0	1 Q	Ogundele (NGR); W 4–2	Feng (SIN); L 0–4	Did not advance				
Jian Fang Lay	Women's singles	Bye					Owen (WAL); W 4–2	Khim (MAS); L 2–4	Did not advance			
Miao Miao	Women's singles	Bye					Carey (WAL); W 4–0	Beh (MAS); L 1–4	Did not advance			
Zhenhua Vivian Tan	Women's singles	Matariki (VAN); W 4–0	Worrell (BAR); W 4–0	—N/a	1 Q	Bye	Li (NZL); W 4–1	Sibley (ENG); W 4–1	Did not advance			

== Tennis ==
=== Men ===
Athlete	Event	Round of 32	Round of 16	Quarterfinals	Semifinals	Final / BM	
Athlete	Event	Opposition Score	Opposition Score	Opposition Score	Opposition Score	Opposition Score	Rank
Matthew Ebden	Men's singles	Ogier (GUE); W 6–3, 6–2	Qureshi (PAK); W 6–4, 7–5	Goodall (ENG); W 6–7, 6–1, 7–6	Devvarman (IND); L 3–6, 1–6	Luczak (AUS); W 6–3, 6–3	3rd place, bronze medalist(s)
Greg Jones	Men's singles	Manders (BER); W 6–1, 6–2	Godamanna (SRI); W 7–6, 6–2	Ward (ENG); W 6–3, 6–2	Luczak (AUS); W 6–7, 6–4, 6–2	Devvarman (IND); L 4–6, 2–6	2nd place, silver medalist(s)
Peter Luczak	Men's singles	King (BAR); W 6–3, 6–3	Bopanna (IND); W 6–2, 7–6	Milton (WAL); W 4–6, 6–2, 6–0	Jones (AUS); L 7–6, 4–6, 2–6	Ebden (AUS); L 3–6, 3–6	4
Matthew Ebden; Greg Jones	Men's doubles	—N/a	Buyinza / Mugabe (UGA); W 6–1, 6–1	Bopanna / Devvarman (IND); L 6–7, 4–6	Did not advance		
Paul Hanley; Peter Luczak	Men's doubles	—N/a	Khan / Qureshi (PAK); W 7–6, 6–4	Lewis / Milton (WAL); W 6–4, 6–0	Bhupathi / Paes (IND); W 6–2, 6–2	Hutchins / Skupski (ENG); W 6–4, 3–6, 6–3	1st place, gold medalist(s)

=== Women ===
Athlete	Event	Round of 32	Round of 16	Quarterfinals	Semifinals	Final / BM	
Athlete	Event	Opposition Score	Opposition Score	Opposition Score	Opposition Score	Opposition Score	Rank
Olivia Rogowska	Women's singles	Brown (SCO); W 6–2, 6–1	Carreras (GIB); W 6–2, 6–4	Chakravarthi (IND); W 7–5, 6–4	Mirza (IND); L 6–1, 4–6, 4–6	Peers (AUS); L 6–4, 6–7, 3–6	4
Anastasia Rodionova	Women's singles	Bye	Russell (BAH); W 6–1, 6–3	Watson (GUE); W 6–0, 6–2	Peers (AUS); W 6–3, 6–7, 6–1	Mirza (IND); W 6–3, 2–6, 7–6	1st place, gold medalist(s)
Sally Peers	Women's singles	Bye	Mahir (MDV); W 6–0, 6–0	Smith (ENG); W 6–3, 6–3	Rodionova (AUS); L 3–6, 7–6, 1–6	Rogowska (AUS); W 4–6, 7–6, 6–3	3rd place, bronze medalist(s)
Anastasia Rodionova; Sally Peers	Women's doubles	—N/a		Fountain / Russell (BAH); W 6–2, 6–4	Chakravarthi / Mirza (IND); W 6–4, 6–4	Rogowska / Moore (AUS); W 6–3, 2–6, 6–3	1st place, gold medalist(s)
Olivia Rogowska; Jessica Moore	Women's doubles	—N/a		Montlha / Nqosa (LES); W 6–0, 6–1	Sanjeev / Venkatesha (IND); W 5–7, 6–3, 7–5	Rodionova / Peers (AUS); L 3–6, 6–2, 3–6	2nd place, silver medalist(s)

=== Mixed ===
Athlete	Event	Round of 16	Quarterfinals	Semifinals	Final / BM	
Athlete	Event	Opposition Score	Opposition Score	Opposition Score	Opposition Score	Rank
Matthew Ebden; Sally Peers	Mixed doubles	Rae / Fleming (SCO); L 6–3, 3–6, 1–6	Did not advance			
Paul Hanley; Anastasia Rodionova	Mixed doubles	Sanjeev / Bopanna (IND); W 6–3, 3–6, 6–3	Brown / Murray (SCO); W 6–3, 6–4	Borwell / Skupski (ENG); W 6–4, 3–6, 7–6	Rae / Fleming (SCO); L 6–7, 7–6, 2–6	2nd place, silver medalist(s)

== Wrestling ==
=== Men's freestyle ===
Athlete	Event	Preliminary	Quarterfinal	Semifinal	Repechage Round 1	Repechage Round 2	Final / BM	
Athlete	Event	Opposition Result	Opposition Result	Opposition Result	Opposition Result	Opposition Result	Opposition Result	Rank
Justin Holland	55kg	Bye	Kumara (SRI); L 0–5	Did not advance				
Farzad Tarash	60kg	Dutt (IND); L 0–13	—N/a		Loots (RSA); L	Did not advance		
Mehrdad Tarash	66kg	Sus Kumar (IND); L 0–6	—N/a		Salmen (PAK); L 4–1	Did not advance		
Kostya Ermakovich	74kg	Joel (NGR); W 6–2	MacDonald (CAN); L 4–0	Did not advance				
Gene Kapaufs	84kg	Bhullar (ENG); W 13–4	Dick (NGR); L 0–6	Did not advance				
Bilal Abdo	96kg	Bye	Pieri (CYP); W 6–1	Jarvis (CAN); L 0–7	—N/a	Umar (PAK); L 0–7	Did not advance	
Denis Roberts	120kg	—N/a	Schutte (RSA); W 4–0	J Kumar (IND); L 0–3	—N/a	Cocker (ENG); W 3–0	Onanena (CMR); L 4–3	4

=== Women's freestyle ===
Athlete	Event	Quarterfinal	Semifinal	Repechage Round 1	Repechage Round 2	Final / BM	
Athlete	Event	Opposition Result	Opposition Result	Opposition Result	Opposition Result	Opposition Result	Rank
Emily Bensted	55kg	—N/a	Clason (SCO); W 5–1	—N/a		Phogat (IND); L 0–8	2nd place, silver medalist(s)
Carli Renzi	59kg	Richard (NGR); L 3–6	Did not advance				
Louise Randle	63kg	Oborududu (NGR); L 0–5	—N/a		Kundu (IND); L 0–6	Did not advance	
Emma Chalmers	67kg	Kalauni (NIU); W 4–0	Buydens (CAN); L 0–11	—N/a	Iheanacho (NGR); L 0–13	Did not advance	
Cassie Field	72kg	Akuffo (CAN); L 3–4	—N/a		Okus (NGR); L 0–7	Did not advance	

=== Greco-Roman ===
Athlete	Event	Quarterfinal	Semifinal	Repechage Round 1	Repechage Round 2	Final / BM	
Athlete	Event	Opposition Result	Opposition Result	Opposition Result	Opposition Result	Opposition Result	Rank
Shane Parker	55kg	Hussain (PAK); L 3–15	—N/a		Sanni (NGR); L 0–7	Did not advance	
Masoud Sadegh Pour	60kg	Joseph (NGR); L 0–5	Did not advance				
Cory O'Brien	66kg	Salman (PAK); W	Dykun (ENG); L 0–11	—N/a	Sun Kumar (IND); L 3–8	Did not advance	
Hassan Shahsavan	74kg	Bye	Addinall (RSA); L 1–4	—N/a	Ali (PAK); W 7–0	Kiribein (NGR); W 3–0	3rd place, bronze medalist(s)
Gene Kapaufs	84kg	Keogh (SCO); W 7–5	Agbonavbare (NGR); L 1–9	—N/a	Afele (SAM); W 5–3	van Zyl (RSA); L 0–4	4
Hassene Fkiri	96kg	Disqualified					
Ivan Popov	120kg	Cocker (ENG); W 7–0	Dalal (IND); W 6–1	—N/a		Mamman (NGR); W 8–0	1st place, gold medalist(s)

== Controversies ==
=== Wrestling ===
Wrestler Hassene Fkiri was disqualified and stripped of the silver medal after making an obscene gesture at the international FILA judges during the final.

=== Washing machine thrown from games village ===
Australian athletes were accused of vandalising the towers of the athletes' village they were staying in by breaking furniture and electrical fittings. Delhi Police did not press the case after the Organising Committee refused to file a complaint while Indian external affairs minister SM Krishna dismissed it as a one-off incident. An unnamed member of the team was sent home early.

A washing machine was hurled from the eighth floor of the same tower. Nobody on the ground was hit, but it is unclear who the culprit was. Indian newspapers have reported that the Australian authorities agreed to pay for the damages and have apologised for the incident. The Australian High Commissioner rejected the claim, stating that the incident was the result of partying and celebrations. Later comments by Australian officials have contradicted claims by Lalit Bhanot that they had admitted responsibility. Perry Crosswhite said that it was still unclear if athletes from other nations present in the tower at the time had been responsible.

== See also ==
- Australia at the 2008 Summer Olympics
- Australia at the 2012 Summer Olympics
