= Diving at the 2010 Commonwealth Games – Women's 1 metre springboard =

The Women's 1 metre springboard diving event is one of 260 events in 17 disciplines at the 2010 Commonwealth Games. It was held on 12 October 2010.

== Results ==
Green denotes finalists

Rank	Diver	Preliminary		Final	
Rank	Diver	Points	Rank	Points	Rank
Gold medal	Jennifer Abel (CAN)	274.70	2	301.75	1
Silver medal	Sharleen Stratton (AUS)	277.00	1	299.15	2
Bronze medal	Émilie Heymans (CAN)	273.75	3	296.10	3
4	Jaele Patrick (AUS)	270.65	4	283.60	4
5	Olivia Wright (AUS)	256.20	6	268.35	5
6	Rebecca Gallantree (ENG)	251.25	7	262.30	6
7	Leong Mun Yee (MAS)	248.70	9	262.10	7
8	Alicia Blagg (ENG)	262.20	5	253.85	8
9	Pamela Ware (CAN)	249.65	8	243.65	9
10	Cheong Jun Hoong (MAS)	227.15	10	235.80	10
11	Gabe Armstrong-Scott (NZL)	222.50	11	228.45	11
12	Hrutika Shriram (IND)	152.55	12	166.95	12
13	Karishma Mohite (IND)	137.10	13		
