= Cycling at the 2010 Commonwealth Games – Women's points race =

The Women's points race at the 2010 Commonwealth Games in New Delhi, India took place on 6 October 2010 at the Indira Gandhi Arena.

== Final ==
Rank	Name	Sprint Points	Extra Laps	Total Points
1st place, gold medalist(s)	Megan Dunn (AUS)	25	1	45
2nd place, silver medalist(s)	Lauren Ellis (NZL)	20	1	40
3rd place, bronze medalist(s)	Tara Whitten (CAN)	16	1	36
4	Katie Colclough (ENG)	4	1	24
5	Heather Wilson (NIR)	2	1	22
6	Joanne Kiesanowski (NZL)	14		14
7	Rushlee Buchanan (NZL)	9		9
8	Belinda Goss (AUS)	8		8
9	Laura Trott (ENG)	5		5
10	Josephine Tomic (AUS)	2		2
11	Mahitha Mohan (IND)	1		1
12	Lucy Martin (ENG)	1		1
13	Alex Greenfield (WAL)	1		1
14	Hannah Rich (WAL)	0		0
15	Kate Cullen (SCO)	0		0
–	Suchitra Devi (IND)	0	−1	DNF
–	Rejani Vijaya Kumari (IND)	0	−1	DNF
–	Eileen Roe (SCO)	0		DNF
