= Cycling at the 2010 Commonwealth Games – Women's sprint =

The Women's individual sprint took place at 6 and 7 October 2010 at the Indira Gandhi Arena.

== Preliminaries ==
200 metre time trial, top 8 advanced to the quarterfinals.

Rank	Rider	Time	Average Speed (km/h)
1	Anna Meares (AUS)	11.140, CWG	64.631
2	Kaarle McCurloch (AUS)	11.440	62.937
3	Becky James (WAL)	11.458	62.838
4	Emily Rosemond (AUS)	11.504	62.586
5	Monique Sullivan (CAN)	11.949	60.256
6	Jenny Davies (SCO)	12.353	58.285
7	Charline Joiner (SCO)	12.435	57.901
8	Mahitha Mohan (IND)	12.635	56.984
9	Rameshwori Devi (IND)	13.398	53.739
10	Rejani Vijaya Kumari (IND)	13.917	51.735

== Results ==
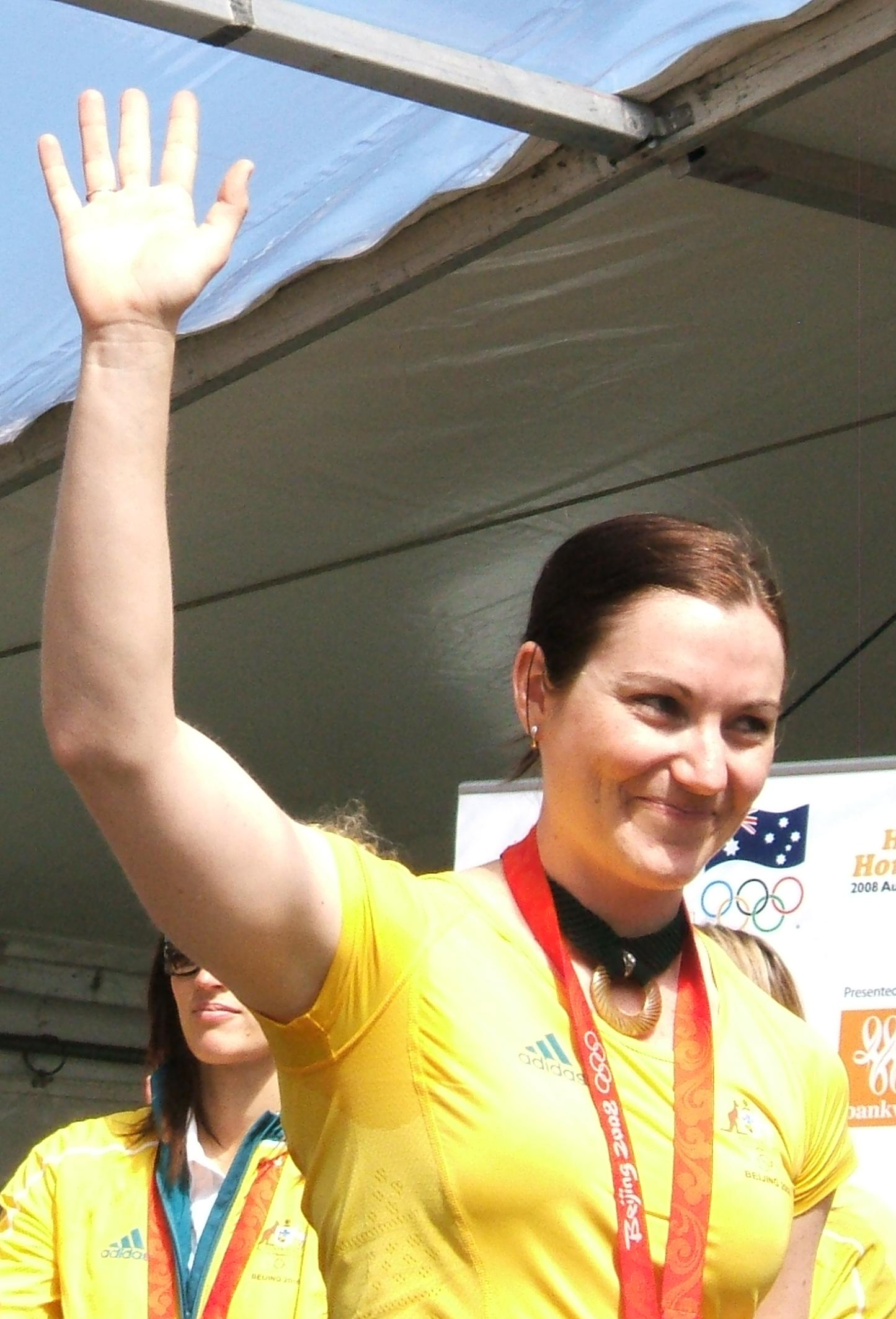
Anna Meares

=== Quarterfinals ===
The eight cyclists qualified were paired for a best two-out-of-three series of 200 metre races. None of the pairings required a third race.

Heat	Rank	Name	Nation	Race 1	Race 2	Decider	Notes
1	1	Anna Meares	Australia	13.218	13.541		Q
1	2	Mahitha Mohan	India				
2	1	Kaarle McCurloch	Australia	12.446	12.282		Q
2	2	Charline Joiner	Scotland				
3	1	Becky James	Wales	12.339	12.134		Q
3	2	Jenny Davies	Scotland				
4	1	Emily Rosemond	Australia	11.816	12.549		Q
4	2	Monique Sullivan	Canada				

=== Race for 5th-8th Places ===
Rank	Name	Nation	Time
5	Monique Sullivan	Canada	12.364
6	Charline Joiner	Scotland	
7	Mahitha Mohan	India	
8	Jenny Davies	Scotland	

=== Semifinals ===
Heat	Rank	Name	Nation	Race 1	Race 2	Decider	Notes
1	1	Anna Meares	Australia	11.717	11.748		Q
1	2	Emily Rosemond	Australia				
2	1	Becky James	Wales	12.039	11.959		Q
2	2	Kaarle McCurloch	Australia				

=== Finals ===
Rank	Name	Nation	Race 1	Race 2	Decider
Gold Medal Races
1st place, gold medalist(s)	Anna Meares	Australia	11.525	11.549	
2nd place, silver medalist(s)	Becky James	Wales			
Bronze Medal Races
3rd place, bronze medalist(s)	Emily Rosemond	Australia			
4	Kaarle McCurloch	Australia	DSQ	DSQ	
