= Swimming at the 2010 Commonwealth Games – Women's 400 metre individual medley =

The Women's 400 metre individual medley event at the 2010 Commonwealth Games took place on 9 October 2010, at the SPM Swimming Pool Complex.

Two heats were held. The heat in which a swimmer competed did not formally matter for advancement, as the swimmers with the top eight times from the entire field qualified for the finals.

== Heats ==
=== Heat 1 ===
Rank	Lane	Name	Nationality	Time	Notes
1	6	Keri-Anne Payne	England	4:43.14	Q
2	4	Samantha Hamill	Australia	4:47.08	Q
3	3	Alexandra Komarnycky	Canada	4:48.94	Q
4	5	Natalie Wiegersma	New Zealand	4:48.96	Q
5	7	Sycerika McMahon	Northern Ireland	4:55.65	
6	1	Sian Morgan	Wales	5:03.39	
7	8	Kanch Desai	India	5:28.41	
–	2	Katie Goldman	Australia		DNS

=== Heat 2 ===
Rank	Lane	Name	Nationality	Time	Notes
1	4	Hannah Miley	Scotland	4:43.78	Q
2	5	Blair Evans	Australia	4:44.96	Q
3	6	Aimee Willmott	England	4:48.39	Q
4	3	Stephanie Proud	England	4:48.83	Q
5	7	Genevieve Cantin	Canada	5:00.77	
6	1	Corrie Scott	Scotland	5:03.66	
7	8	Richa Mishra	India	5:03.72	
–	2	Wendy Trott	South Africa		DNS

== Final ==
Rank	Lane	Name	Nationality	Time	Notes
1st place, gold medalist(s)	5	Hannah Miley	Scotland	4:38.83	CG
2nd place, silver medalist(s)	6	Samantha Hamill	Australia	4:39.45	
3rd place, bronze medalist(s)	4	Keri-Anne Payne	England	4:41.07	
4	3	Blair Evans	Australia	4:41.51	
5	2	Aimee Willmott	England	4:44.87	
6	7	Stephanie Proud	England	4:46.17	
7	1	Alexandra Komarnycky	Canada	4:47.69	
8	8	Sycerika McMahon	Northern Ireland	4:52.47	
