= Cycling at the 2010 Commonwealth Games – Women's 500 m time trial =

The Women's 500 m time trial took place at 5 October 2010 at the Indira Gandhi Arena.

== Results ==
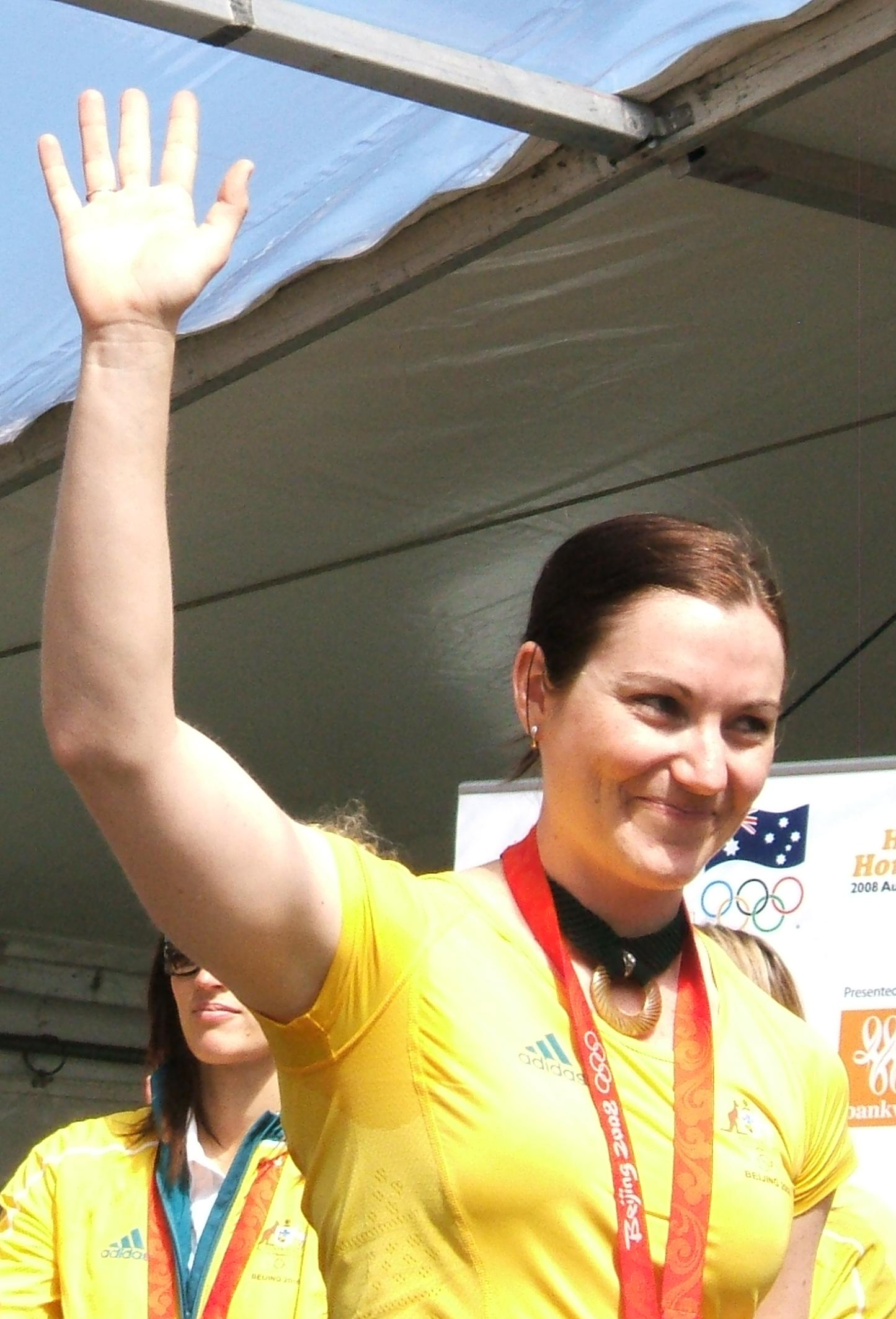
Anna Meares

Rank	Rider	Time	Average Speed (km/h)
1st place, gold medalist(s)	Anna Meares (AUS)	33.758 (CWG)	53.320
2nd place, silver medalist(s)	Kaarle McCulloch (AUS)	34.780	51.753
3rd place, bronze medalist(s)	Becky James (WAL)	35.236	51.084
4	Monique Sullivan (CAN)	36.238	49.671
5	Jenny Davis (SCO)	36.416	49.428
6	Alison Shanks (NZL)	36.565	49.227
7	Anna Blyth (ENG)	36.807	48.903
8	Charline Joiner (SCO)	37.539	47.950
9	Wendy Houvenaghel (NIR)	38.289	47.010
10	Mahitha Mohan (IND)	38.788	46.406
11	Rameshwori Devi (IND)	38.913	46.257
12	Heather Wilson (NIR)	40.189	44.788
13	Rejani Vijaya Kumari (IND)	40.439	44.511
