= Gymnastics at the 2010 Commonwealth Games – Women's floor =

The Women's floor event took place on 8 October 2010 at the Indira Gandhi Arena.

== Final ==
Position	Gymnast	D Score	E Score	Penalty	Total
1st place, gold medalist(s)	Imogen Cairns (ENG)	5.700	8.500		14.200
2nd place, silver medalist(s)	Lauren Mitchell (AUS)	5.700	8.225		13.925
3rd place, bronze medalist(s)	Ashleigh Brennan (AUS)	5.300	8.225	0.1	13.425
4	Amy Regan (SCO)	5.000	8.075		13.075
5	Laura Edwards (ENG)	5.000	8.025	0.1	12.925
6	Ashleigh Heldsinger (RSA)	4.500	7.975		12.475
7	Jordan Rae (NZL)	4.700	6.900	0.1	11.500
8	Tracie Ang (MAS)	5.000	6.600	0.4	11.200
