= Swimming at the 2010 Commonwealth Games – Men's 50 metre backstroke =

The Men's 50 metre backstroke event at the 2010 Commonwealth Games took place on 4 and 5 October 2010, at the SPM Swimming Pool Complex.

Four heats were held, with most containing the maximum number of swimmers (eight). The top sixteen times qualified for the semi-finals and, the top eight from there qualified for the finals.

== Heats ==
Rank	Name	Nationality	Time	Heat	Lane	Notes
1	Liam Tancock	England	25.47	4	4	
2	Daniel Arnamnart	Australia	25.52	4	5	
3	Hayden Stoeckel	Australia	25.56	2	4	
4	Marco Loughran	Wales	25.62	2	5	
5	Gareth Kean	New Zealand	25.80	4	3	
6	Daniel Bell	New Zealand	25.90	3	5	
7	Ashley Delaney	Australia	25.94	2	4	
8	Charles Francis	Canada	26.04	3	3	
9	Tobias Oriwol	Canada	26.62	3	6	
10	Christian-Paul Homer	Trinidad and Tobago	27.12	2	3	
11	Kuamarakulsinghe Barr	Malaysia	27.45	4	1	
12	Zane Jordan	Zambia	27.46	2	7	
13	Joshua McLeod	Trinidad and Tobago	27.50	2	6	
14	Badrinath Melkote	India	27.52	3	2	
15	Caryle Blondell	Trinidad and Tobago	27.53	4	7	
16	Dzulhaili Kamal	Singapore	27.60	4	6	
17	Heshan Unamboowe	Sri Lanka	27.87	2	2	
18	Amini Fonua	Tonga	28.07	4	8	
19	Alexandar Beaton	Guernsey	28.77	2	1	
20	Praveen Tokas	India	29.16	1	6	
21	Benjamin Loundes	Guernsey	29.35	3	7	
22	Nicholas Coard	Grenada	29.27	3	1	
23	Kurtis Tulia	Samoa	29.47	1	2	
24	Peter Pokawin	Papua New Guinea	30.06	2	8	
25	Milimo Mweeta	Zambia	30.89	3	8	
26	Akshay Shah	Kenya	31.54	1	4	
27	Daniel Pryke	Papua New Guinea	31.98	1	5	
28	Ryan Govinden	Seychelles	33.62	1	3	
-	Marios Panagi	Cyprus	DNS	4	2	

== Semifinals ==
Rank	Name	Nationality	Time	Heat	Lane	Notes
1	Ashley Delaney	Australia	25.04	2	6	
2	Hayden Stoeckel	Australia	25.27	2	5	
3	Daniel Arnamnart	Australia	25.39	1	4	
4	Marco Loughran	Wales	25.43	1	5	
5	Daniel Bell	New Zealand	25.44	1	3	
6	Liam Tancock	England	25.62	2	4	
7	Gareth Kean	New Zealand	25.87	2	3	
8	Charles Francis	Canada	26.20	1	6	
9	Tobias Oriwol	Canada	26.56	2	2	
10	Christian-Paul Homer	Trinidad and Tobago	26.99	1	2	
11	Kuamarakulsinghe Barr	Malaysia	27.21	2	7	
12	Badrinath Melkote	India	27.26	1	1	
13	Joshua McLeod	Trinidad and Tobago	27.35	2	1	
14	Zane Jordan	Zambia	27.70	1	7	
15	Dzulhaili Kamal	Singapore	27.74	1	8	
16	Caryle Blondell	Trinidad and Tobago	28.24	2	8	

== Final ==
Rank	Name	Nationality	Lane	Time	Notes
1st place, gold medalist(s)	Liam Tancock	England	7	24.62	CGR
2nd place, silver medalist(s)	Hayden Stoeckel	Australia	5	25.08	
3rd place, bronze medalist(s)	Ashley Delaney	Australia	4	25.21	
4	Daniel Bell	New Zealand	2	25.27	
5	Marco Loughran	Wales	6	25.58	
6	Daniel Arnamnart	Australia	3	25.66	
7	Charles Francis	Canada	8	25.87	
8	Gareth Kean	New Zealand	1	25.89	
