= Diving at the 2010 Commonwealth Games – Women's synchronised 10 metre platform =

The Women's 10 m synchro platform at the 2010 Commonwealth Games was held on 10 October 2010.

== Results ==
Rank	Nation	Dives					Total
Rank	Nation	1	2	3	4	5	Total
1st place, gold medalist(s)	Australia; Melissa Wu, Alexandra Croak	53.40	52.20	75.84	75.60	78.72	335.76
2nd place, silver medalist(s)	Malaysia; Pandelela Rinong Pamg, Leong Mun Yee	51.60	51.00	69.30	73.92	82.56	328.38
3rd place, bronze medalist(s)	Australia; Briony Cole, Anabelle Smith	52.80	49.20	74.70	71.04	77.76	325.50
4	England; Tonia Couch, Sarah Barrow	48.60	51.00	73.92	68.40	77.76	319.68
5	Malaysia; Cheong Jun Hoong, Traisy Vivien Tukiet	51.60	51.00	75.84	70.08	67.86	316.38
6	Canada; Pamela Ware, Carol-Ann Ware	48.60	48.60	68.85	74.88	74.88	315.81
7	England; Stacie Powell, Rebecca Gallantree	48.00	51.60	69.30	72.96	70.08	311.94
8	Canada; Rachel Kemp, Roseline Filion	50.40	49.20	63.90	68.31	66.24	298.05
