= Athletics at the 2010 Commonwealth Games – Men's 1500 metres (T54) =

The Para Sport - Men's 1500 metres (T54) at the 2010 Commonwealth Games as part of the athletics programme was held at the Jawaharlal Nehru Stadium on Sunday 10 October 2010.

== Results ==
Rank	Name	Order	Result	Notes
1st place, gold medalist(s)	Kurt Fearnley (AUS)	5	3:19.86	
2nd place, silver medalist(s)	Richard Colman (AUS)	6	3:20.90	
3rd place, bronze medalist(s)	Josh Cassidy (CAN)	2	3:21.14	
4	Matthew Lack (NZL)	8	3:21.20	
5	Jean-Paul Compaore (CAN)	4	3:21.45	
6	Brian Alldis (WAL)	9	3:21.85	
7	Jake Lappin (AUS)	3	3:24.26	
8	Nkegbe Botsyo (GHA)	1	3:27.08	
9	Patrick Yaw Obeng (GHA)	10	3:28.21	
10	Felix Acheampong (GHA)	7	3:33.58	
