= Diving at the 2010 Commonwealth Games – Women's 3 metre springboard =

The Women's 3 metre springboard diving event is one of 260 events in 17 disciplines at the 2010 Commonwealth Games. It was held on 13 October 2010.

== Results ==
Green denotes finalists

Rank	Diver	Preliminary		Final	
Rank	Diver	Points	Rank	Points	Rank
Gold medal	Sharleen Stratton (AUS)	348.60	1	376.00	1
Silver medal	Jennifer Abel (CAN)	347.25	2	338.55	2
Bronze medal	Jaele Patrick (AUS)	314.05	3	326.15	3
4	Anabelle Smith (AUS)	282.10	5	324.30	4
5	Rebecca Gallantree (ENG)	274.30	6	313.20	5
6	Grace Reid (SCO)	271.70	7	303.15	6
7	Pamela Ware (CAN)	263.25	8	299.05	7
8	Ng Yan Yee (MAS)	231.95	11	290.15	8
9	Émilie Heymans (CAN)	313.20	4	252.60	9
10	Alicia Blagg (ENG)	259.05	9	243.30	10
11	Hrutika Shriram (IND)	190.10	12	194.60	11
12	Karishma Mohite (IND)	190.10	13	175.35	12
13	Pandelela Rinong Pamg (MAS)	255.20	10		
