= Gymnastics at the 2010 Commonwealth Games – Men's rings =

The Men's artistic rings event took place on 7 October 2010 at the Indira Gandhi Arena.

== Final ==
Position	Gymnast	D Score	E Score	Penalty	Total
1st place, gold medalist(s)	Samuel Offord (AUS)	6.300	8.525		14.825
2nd place, silver medalist(s)	Luke Folwell (ENG)	6.200	8.550		14.750
3rd place, bronze medalist(s)	Irodotos Georgallas (CYP)	6.300	8.350		14.650
4	Reiss Beckford (ENG)	5.300	8.900		14.200
5	Misha Koudinov (NZL)	5.600	8.375		13.975
6	Prashanth Sellathurai (AUS)	6.300	7.450		13.750
7	Jason Scott (CAN)	5.400	7.700		13.100
8	Ian Galvan (CAN)	5.200	7.175		12.375
