= Diving at the 2010 Commonwealth Games – Men's synchronised 10 metre platform =

The Men's 10 m synchro platform at the 2010 Commonwealth Games was held on 12 October 2010.

== Results ==
Rank	Nation	Dives						Total
Rank	Nation	1	2	3	4	5	6	Total
1st place, gold medalist(s)	England; Max Brick, Tom Daley	50.40	49.80	81.60	87.12	82.17	88.56	439.65
2nd place, silver medalist(s)	Australia; Matthew Mitcham, Ethan Warren	43.80	49.80	79.20	80.64	86.13	84.24	423.81
3rd place, bronze medalist(s)	Canada; Eric Sehn, Kevin Geyson	52.20	47.40	76.80	68.40	71.28	78.72	394.80
4	Malaysia; Tze Ooi, Abd Muhammad	48.60	49.20	75.84	63.84	69.12	65.70	372.30
