= Squash at the 2010 Commonwealth Games – Men's doubles =

The Men's doubles event at the 2010 Commonwealth Games was held at the Siri Fort Sports Complex, New Delhi from 9 October to 13 October.

The men's doubles squash winners at the 2010 Commonwealth Games were Nick Matthew of England and Adrian Grant.

== Seeds ==
1. (England) Nick Matthew & Adrian Grant
2. (Australia) David Palmer & Stewart Boswell
3. (England) Peter Barker & Daryl Selby
4. (Australia) Cameron Pilley & Ryan Cuskelly
5. (Scotland) Alan Clyne & Harry Leitch
6. (Malaysia) Mohd Azlan Iskandar & Mohd Nafiizwan Adnan
7. (New Zealand) Campbell Grayson & Martin Knight
8. (India) Gaurav Nandrajog & Siddharth Suchde
9. (Scotland) Lyall Paterson & Chris Small
10. (Pakistan) Aamir Atlas Khan & Farhan Mehboob
11. (India) Sandeep Jangra & Harinder Pal Sandhu
12. (Pakistan) Yasir Butt & Danish Atlas Khan
13. (Canada) Robin Clarke & Shawn Delierre
14. (Malta) Michael Fiteni & Bradley Hindle
15. (Botswana) Lekgotla Mosope & Lefika Ragontse
16. (Zambia) Patrick Chifunda & Lazarus Chiluba Chilufy

== Finals ==
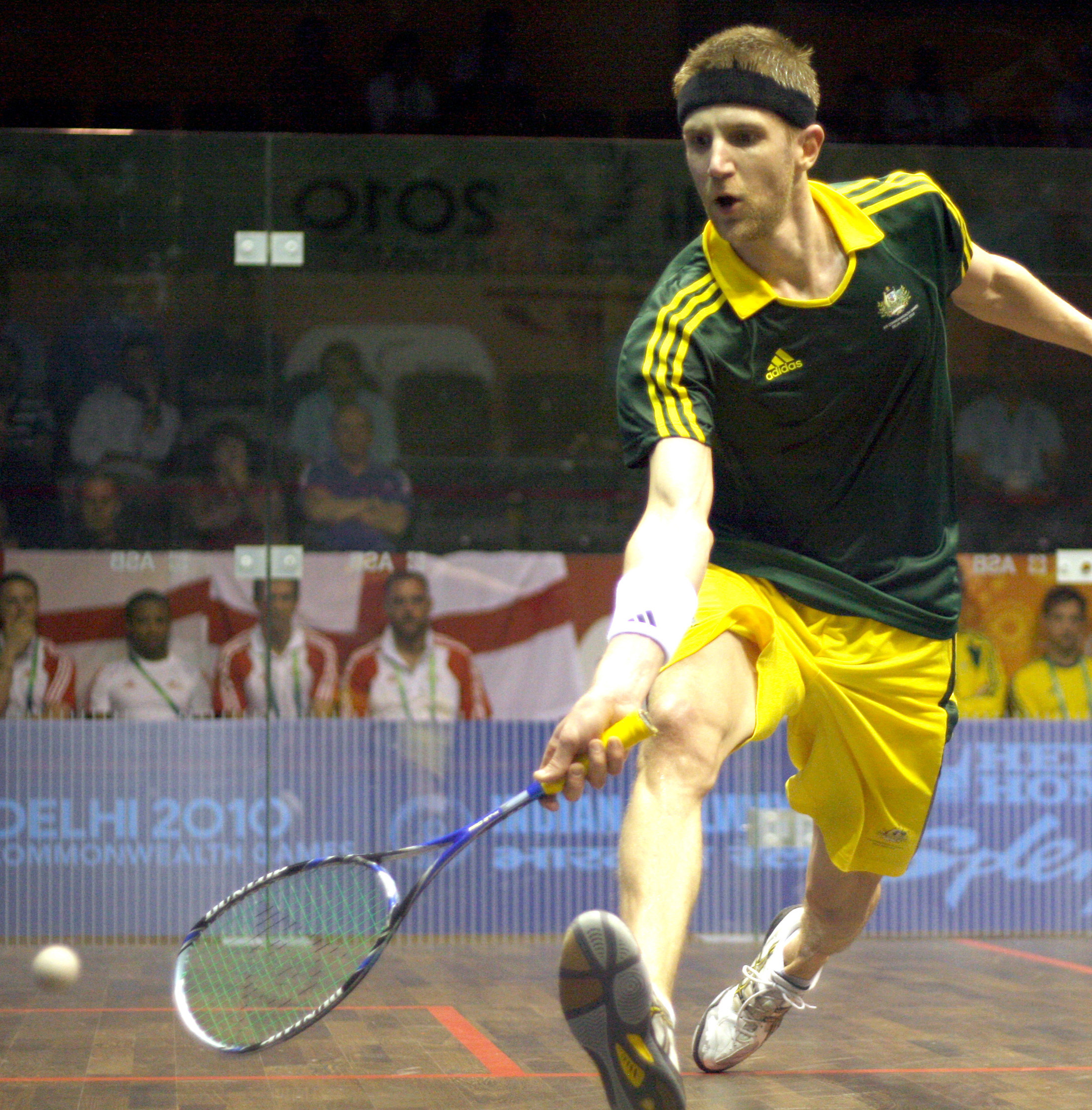
XIX Commonwealth Games-2010 Delhi Squash (Men’s) Stewart Boswell of Australia in an action against Peter Barker of England, at Sirifort Sports Complex, in New Delhi on October 06, 2010

Quarterfinals
Adrian Grant (ENG); Nick Matthew (ENG) | 11 | 11
Mohd Adnan (MAS); Mohd Iskandar (MAS) | 5 | 10
Ryan Cuskelly (AUS); Cameron Pilley (AUS) | 11 | 11
Campbell Grayson (NZL); Martin Knight (NZL) | 9 | 10
Alan Clyne (SCO); Harry Leitch (SCO) | 11 | 11
Peter Barker (ENG); Daryl Selby (ENG) | 7 | 7
Lyall Paterson (SCO); Chris Small (SCO) | 2 | 2
Stewart Boswell (AUS); David Palmer (AUS) | 11 | 11

Semifinals
Adrian Grant (ENG); Nick Matthew (ENG) | 11 | 11
Ryan Cuskelly (AUS); Cameron Pilley (AUS) | 10 | 9
Alan Clyne (SCO); Harry Leitch (SCO) | 10 | 6
Stewart Boswell (AUS); David Palmer (AUS) | 11 | 11

Gold Medal Match
Adrian Grant (ENG); Nick Matthew (ENG) | 11 | 6 | 11
Stewart Boswell (AUS); David Palmer (AUS) | 9 | 11 | 5
Bronze Medal Match
Ryan Cuskelly (AUS); Cameron Pilley (AUS) | 11 | 11
Alan Clyne (SCO); Harry Leitch (SCO) | 5 | 7
