= Gymnastics at the 2010 Commonwealth Games – Men's floor =

The Men's artistic floor event took place on 7 October 2010 at the Indira Gandhi Arena.

== Final ==
Position	Gymnast	D Score	E Score	Penalty	Total
1st place, gold medalist(s)	Thomas Pichler (AUS)	6.100	8.575		14.675
2nd place, silver medalist(s)	Reiss Beckford (ENG)	6.100	8.525		14.625
3rd place, bronze medalist(s)	Ashish Kumar (IND)	6.500	8.075	0.1	14.475
4	Steve Jehu (ENG)	6.000	8.350	0.1	14.250
5	Constantinos Aristotelous (CYP)	5.600	7.975		13.575
6	Misha Koudinov (NZL)	5.900	7.325		13.225
7	Luke Wiwatowski (AUS)	5.900	6.975		12.875
8	Patrick Peng (NZL)	5.300	6.600		11.900
