= Gymnastics at the 2010 Commonwealth Games – Men's parallel bars =

Event in the 2010 Commonwealth Games

The Men's artistic parallel bars event took place on 8 October 2010 at the Indira Gandhi Arena.

== Final ==
Position	Gymnast	D Score	E Score	Penalty	Total
1st place, gold medalist(s)	Joshua Jefferis (AUS)	6.200	8.425		14.625
2nd place, silver medalist(s)	Luke Folwell (ENG)	5.500	8.700		14.200
3rd place, bronze medalist(s)	Prashanth Sellathurai (AUS)	5.100	8.900		14.000
4	Mark Holyoake (NZL)	5.600	8.225		13.825
5	Reiss Beckford (ENG)	5.100	8.450		13.550
6	Tariq Dowers (CAN)	4.900	8.400		13.300
7	Jason Scott (CAN)	5.000	7.650		12.650
8	Panagiotis Aristotelous (CYP)	5.100	7.375		12.475
