= Swimming at the 2010 Commonwealth Games – Men's 100 metre freestyle S8 =

The Men's 100 metre freestyle S8 event at the 2010 Commonwealth Games took place on 8 October 2010, at the SPM Swimming Pool Complex, Delhi.

== Finals ==
| Rank | Lane | Name | Class | Nationality | Time | Notes |
|---|---|---|---|---|---|---|
| 1st place, gold medalist(s) | 4 | Benjamin James Austin | S8 | Australia | 1:00.44 | |
| 2nd place, silver medalist(s) | 6 | Sean Fraser | S8 | Scotland | 1:00.77 | |
| 3rd place, bronze medalist(s) | 5 | Blake Cochrane | S8 | Australia | 1:00.95 | |
| 4 | 3 | David Evan Roberts | S7 | Wales | 1:02.88 | |
| 5 | 2 | Sharath Mahadevarao Gayakwad | S8 | India | 1:04.18 | |
| 6 | 7 | David Wangyu Kulek | S8 | Malaysia | 1:15.45 | |
| 7 | 1 | Naveen Kumar | S7 | India | 1:25.24 | |
