= Thomas Pichler =

Australian artistic gymnast

- Born: 18 September 1986 (age 40) Hohenems, Austria

Gymnastics career
- Discipline: Men's artistic gymnastics
- Country represented: Australia
Medal record
Men's artistic gymnastics
Representing Australia
Commonwealth Games
Gold medal – first place	2010 Delhi	Team
Gold medal – first place	2010 Delhi	Floor

Thomas Pichler (born 18 September 1986) is an Australian former artistic gymnast.

== Early life ==
Born in Austria, Pichler suffered from health problems as a child, which resulted in his family moving to Australia in search of a warmer climate. He grew up in Brisbane, Queensland.

== Gymnastics career ==
Pichler was out of action in 2009 due to a knee reconstruction but returned in 2010 to claim two gold medals at the Delhi Commonwealth Games, for the floor and team all-around events.

In 2017, Pichler was a contestant on the first season of Australian Ninja Warrior.
