= Shooting at the 2010 Commonwealth Games – Men's 10 metre air pistol singles =

The Men's 10 metre air pistol singles event took place at 8 October 2010 at the CRPF Campus. There was a qualification round held to determine the final participants.

== Results ==
Rank	Name	1	2	3	4	5	6	Final	Total
1st place, gold medalist(s)	Omkar Singh (IND)	98	98	96	98	98	96	97.8	681.8 (EGR)
2nd place, silver medalist(s)	Gai Bin (SIN)	98	96	96	95	98	97	96.2	676.2
3rd place, bronze medalist(s)	Daniel Repacholi (AUS)	97	94	94	95	99	96	99.0	674.0
4	Roger Daniel (TRI)	96	97	95	98	97	94	96.1	673.1
5	Gurpreet Singh (IND)	94	94	97	95	99	95	97.7	671.7
6	Mick Gault (ENG)	95	94	95	95	98	97	97.6	671.6
7	Greg Yelavich (NZL)	93	96	94	95	97	95	98.4	668.4
8	Kalim Khan (PAK)	94	95	96	95	94	96	97.0	667.0
