= Synchronised swimming at the 2010 Commonwealth Games =

- Venue: Dr. S.P. Mukherjee Swimming Stadium, Talkatora Gardens
- Location: Delhi, India
- Dates: 5 to 11 October 2010

Synchronised swimming at the 2006 Commonwealth Games was the seventh appearance of Synchronised swimming at the Commonwealth Games. Competition was held in Delhi, India, 5 to 11 October 2010 and featured contests in two events for women only.

It was the last time that synchronised swimming featured at the Commonwealth Games.

The two events (solo and duet) were held on Wednesday 6 and Thursday 7 October at the Dr. S.P. Mukherjee Swimming Stadium in Talkatora Gardens.

Canada topped the medal table by virtue of winning both gold medals.

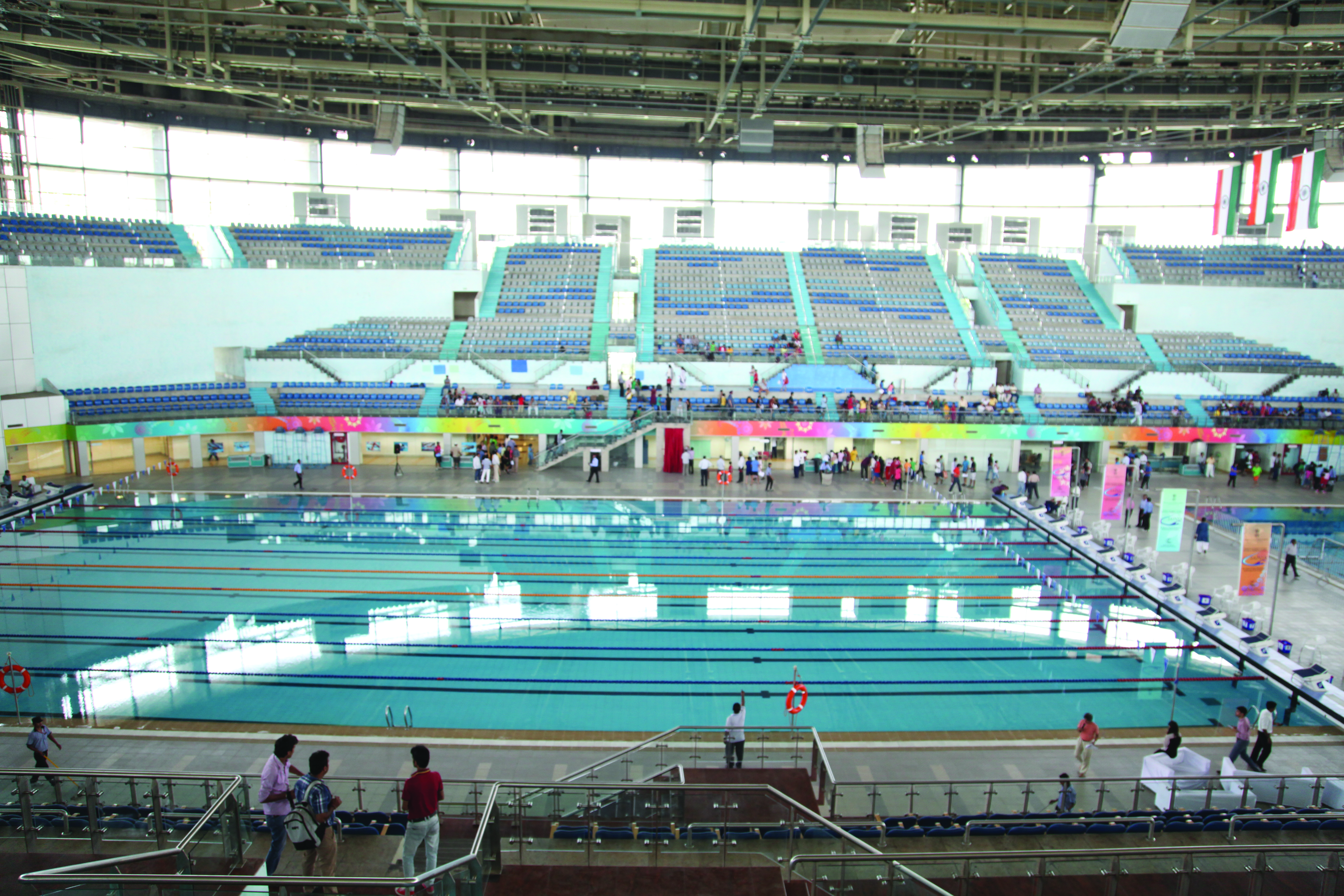
The Dr. S.P. Mukherjee Swimming Stadium

== Medal table ==
Rank	Nation	Gold	Silver	Bronze	Total
1	Canada	2	0	0	2
2	England	0	2	0	2
3	Australia	0	0	1	1
3	Scotland	0	0	1	1
Totals (4 entries)		2	2	2	6

== Medallists ==
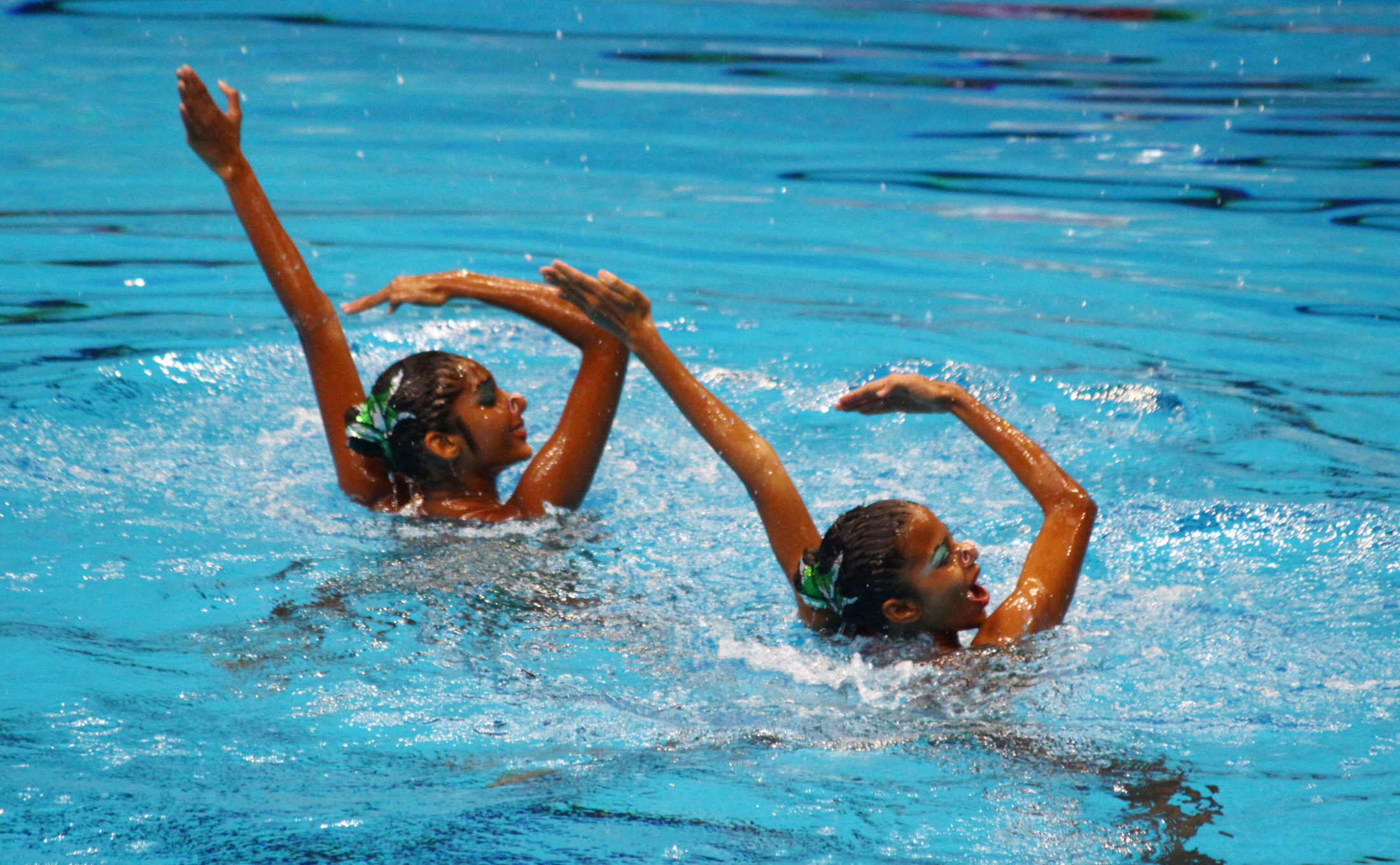
Sri Lankan pair performing during the duet technical routine on 6 October 2010

Event	Gold	Silver	Bronze
Solo	Marie-Pier Boudreau Gagnon; Canada	Jenna Randall; England	Lauren Smith; Scotland
Duet	Canada; Marie-Pier Boudreau Gagnon; Chloé Isaac	England; Olivia Allison; Jenna Randall	Australia; Eloise Amberger; Sarah Bombell

== Participating nations ==
- Australia (3)
- Canada (2)
- England (3)
- India (3)
- Malaysia (3)
- New Zealand (2)
- Scotland (1)
- Singapore (1)
- Sri Lanka (2)
