= Diving at the 2010 Commonwealth Games – Women's synchronised 3 metre springboard =

Women's diving at the 2010 Commonwealth Game

The Women's 3 m synchro springboard at the 2010 Commonwealth Games was held on 10 October 2010.

== Results ==
Rank	Nation	Dives					Total
Rank	Nation	1	2	3	4	5	Total
1st place, gold medalist(s)	Canada; Jennifer Abel, Émilie Heymans	38.60	51.60	74.70	72.90	71.10	318.90
2nd place, silver medalist(s)	Australia; Briony Cole, Sharleen Stratton	50.40	46.80	63.24	70.20	70.28	300.84
3rd place, bronze medalist(s)	Australia; Jaele Patrick, Olivia Wright	50.40	47.40	63.00	68.82	65.70	295.32
4	England; Rebecca Gallantree, Alicia Blagg	49.80	48.60	59.64	63.00	72.00	293.04
5	Canada; Pamela Ware, Carol-Ann Ware	46.20	48.60	63.84	63.18	61.20	283.02
6	Malaysia; Mun Leong, Yan Ng	45.00	45.00	66.60	51.24	52.20	260.05
