= Ethan Warren =

Diving Career

Personal information
- Born: 2 October 1991 (age 34) Sunnybank, Queensland
- Height: 173 cm (5 ft 8 in)
- Weight: 100 kg (220 lb)

Sport
- Country: Australia
- Event(s): 3 m, 10 m
- Coached by: Xiangning Chen, Hui Tong
- Retired: February 2013

Achievements and titles
- Olympic finals: 2012 London Games - 7th place - 3 m springboard
Medal record
Diving
Representing Australia
Commonwealth Games
Silver medal – second place	2010 Delhi	Synchronized 3 m Springboard
Silver medal – second place	2010 Delhi	Synchronized 10 m Platform

Ethan Warren (born 2 October 1991) is an Australian diver.

== Diving career ==
Ethan first received his Australian Institute of Sport scholarship in 2009, which allowed him to focus on his diving career.

Some of career highlights include winning two silver medals at the 2010 Commonwealth Games in the 3 m synchro springboard and 10 m synchro platform, both times alongside teammate Matthew Mitcham. His proudest achievement in his career is his Gold Medal from the Canada Grand Prix May 2012, where he was victorious against the Canadian diving legend Alexander Despatie on his home ground.

He competed at the 2012 Summer Olympics in the men's 3 metre springboard, classifying 7th after finishing first in the 2012 Australian Open Championships in the same event; he has also been the 2011 10 m synchronized Australian champion with partner James Connor.

Ethan Warren retired from competitive diving in early 2013.

In early 2014, Ethan joined the Australian Regular Army, where he is still serving within the role of [Operator Movements].

== Health Concerns ==
Whilst training in the lead up to the London 2012 Olympic Games, Ethan suffered a heart infection called Myocarditis which impeded on his training ability. This infection meant that he missed out on competing for the Shanghai World Titles, and also was banned from training for three months. Thankfully he made a full recovery from the infection, and was able to successfully compete.
