= Gymnastics at the 2010 Commonwealth Games – Men's artistic team all-around =

Men's artistic team all-around at the 2010 Commonwealth Games
- Venue: Indira Gandhi Arena
- Dates: 4 October 2010

The Men's artistic team all-around event took place on 4 October 2010 at the Indira Gandhi Arena. Australia won gold with 259.050 points, England finished on 256.750 with Canada third on 248.500 ahead of New Zealand and Wales.

== Results ==
Position	Gymnast	Floor (gymnastics)	Pommel horse	Rings (gymnastics)	Vault (gymnastics)	Parallel bars	Horizontal bar	Total
1st place, gold medalist(s)	Australia	43.950 (1)	38.900 (3)	44.350 (1)	46.500 (1)	42.700 (1)	42.650 (1)	259.050
2nd place, silver medalist(s)	England	42.800 (2)	41.400 (1)	42.900 (2)	45.900 (2)	42.450 (2)	41.300 (2)	256.750
3rd place, bronze medalist(s)	Canada	39.950 (6)	40.050 (2)	41.350 (5)	45.150 (3)	40.700 (3)	41.300 (2)	248.500
4	New Zealand	41.850 (3)	37.650 (6)	41.250 (6)	44.550 (4)	40.250 (4)	38.250 (6)	243.800
5	Wales	40.200 (5)	38.150 (4)	39.650 (7)	44.300 (6)	38.850 (7)	39.300 (5)	240.450
6	India	39.750 (7)	37.850 (5)	41.600 (4)	44.450 (5)	39.550 (5)	37.200 (8)	240.400
7	Cyprus	40.250 (4)	35.250 (8)	41.650 (3)	43.050 (8)	39.050 (6)	40.800 (4)	240.050
8	Malaysia	36.900 (8)	36.600 (7)	37.250 (8)	43.150 (7)	38.750 (8)	37.750 (7)	230.400
9	Isle of Man	36.600 (9)	34.050 (9)	35.650 (9)	38.450 (9)	36.800 (9)	32.100 (9)	213.650
