= Harry Leitch =

Scottish squash player

Personal information
- Nationality: British (Scottish)
- Born: 14 February 1985 (age 41) Edinburgh, Scotland

Sport

Harry Leitch (born 14 February 1985) is a stem cell biologist and a former Scottish international squash player who competed at three Commonwealth Games.

== Squash career ==
Having trained at the Heriot-Watt Squash Academy and the East of Scotland Institute of Sport, Leitch became Scotland's number one junior in 2002.

He made his debut for the Scottish senior team in 2003 and has since made over 60 international appearances. He competed at the European Championships, the World Championships and represented the Scottish team at the 2006 Commonwealth Games in Melbourne, where he, and partner John White, were knocked out (8-10 9-2 9-2 3-9 9-6) in the quarterfinals by the eventual champions Lee Beachill and Peter Nicol.

In 2010, Leitch appeared for the Scottish team again at the 2010 Commonwealth Games, playing alongside Alan Clyne in the men's doubles, and Lisa Aitken in the Mixed Doubles. He and Clyne finished 4th after losing 2–0 to the Australian team in the bronze medal match.

In September 2013 Leitch was one of the first 27 athletes to be selected as part of Team Scotland for the 2014 Commonwealth Games in Glasgow. Leitch and Clyne again reached the semi-finals in men's doubles but ultimately finished 4th, losing to James Willstrop and Daryl Selby of England in the bronze medal match.

In addition, he won a record ten Blues representing the University of Cambridge on the squash court. This led to the introduction of the 'Leitch Law' in 2014, which limits the number of varsity appearances to 8 in total, essentially extending the 'Rankov Rule' from rowing to encompass all Varsity matches.

== Academic career ==
Leitch grew up in Edinburgh, where he attended George Watson's College. Following graduation in 2003, Leitch entered the University of Cambridge, where he obtained a BA in Natural Sciences in 2007. He subsequently completed an MB/PhD at the School of Clinical Medicine and a research fellowship at Wolfson College, as well as teaching Medicine at Fitzwilliam College.
