= Sharleen Stratton =

Australian diver (born 1987)

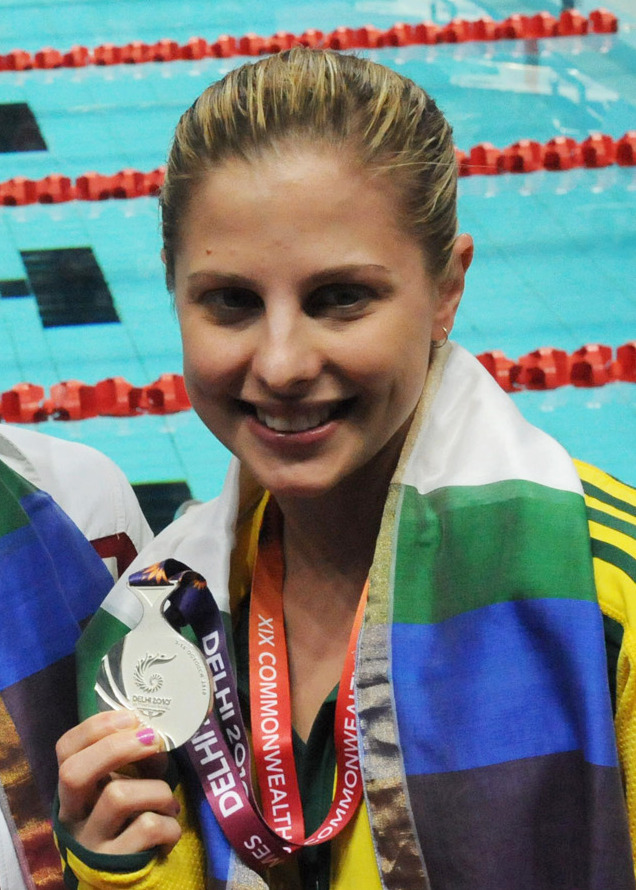
- Stratton at the 2010 Commonwealth Games

Personal information
- Full name: Sharleen Marie Stratton
- Nickname: Shaz
- Nationality: Australian
- Born: 9 October 1987 (age 38) Brisbane, Australia
- Education: Open Universities Australia
- Height: 157 cm (5 ft 2 in)
- Weight: 50 kg (110 lb)

Sport
- Country: Australia
- Sport: Diving
- Event(s): 1 m springboard 3 m springboard 3 m springboard synchro
- Club: Donnet Diving Club
- Coached by: Hui Tong
Medal record
Representing Australia
World Championships
Bronze medal – third place	2007 Melbourne	3 m synchro springboard
Bronze medal – third place	2011 Shanghai	3 m synchro springboard
Commonwealth Games
Gold medal – first place	2006 Melbourne	3 m synchro springboard
Gold medal – first place	2010 Delhi	3 m springboard
Silver medal – second place	2006 Melbourne	1 m springboard
Silver medal – second place	2010 Delhi	1 m springboard
Silver medal – second place	2010 Delhi	3 m synchro springboard
World Cup
Bronze medal – third place	2008 Beijing	3 m springboard

Sharleen Marie Stratton (born 9 October 1987) is an Australian diver who won gold medals at the 2006 and 2010 Commonwealth Games, and competed at the 2008 and 2012 Olympics. She is a current Australian Institute of Sport scholarship holder.

Like many other divers, Stratton started in gymnastics but switched to diving at age 12. With Briony Cole, she won gold at the Commonwealth Games in the 3 metre synchronized diving springboard event. In 2011, she won the bronze medal in the 3 m synchronised springboard at the 2011 World Aquatics Championships with Anabelle Smith.

At the London 2012 Olympics, Stratton placed fifth in the 3 m springboard and synchronised 3 m springboard, together with Anabelle Smith.
