= Olivia Wright =

Australian diver

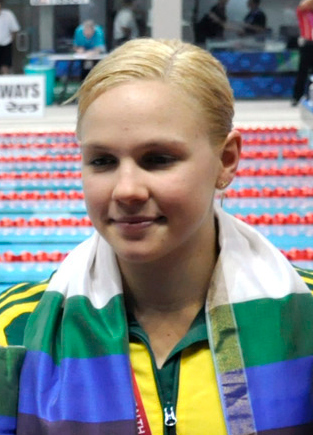
- Wright at the 2010 Commonwealth Games

Personal information
- Born: 12 October 1990 (age 35) Paddington, Australia

Sport
- Sport: Diving
- Event: Springboard
Medal record
Representing Australia
Commonwealth Games
Bronze medal – third place	2010 Delhi	3 m synchro springboard

Olivia Wright (born 12 October 1990) is an Australian diver. She won a bronze medal in the three metre synchronised springboard at the 2010 Commonwealth Games with Jaele Patrick, placing fifth in the individual 1 m springboard.
