= Jaele Patrick =

Australian springboard diver

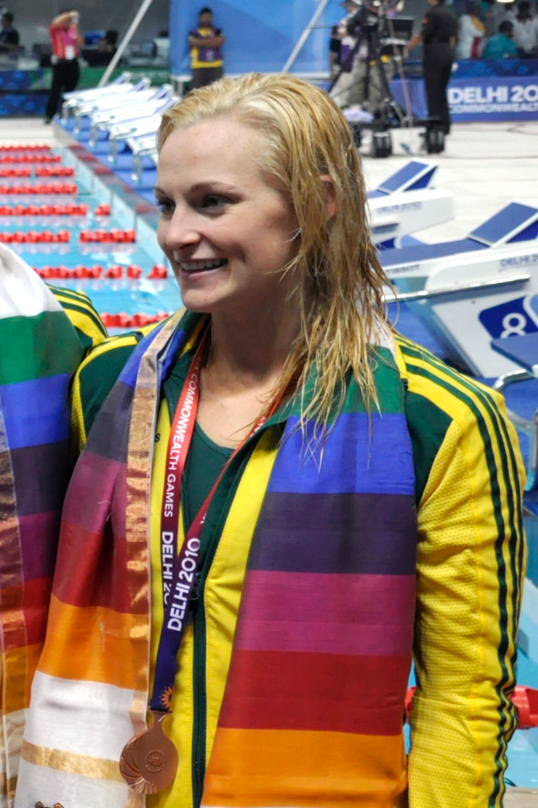
- Patrick at the 2010 Commonwealth Games

Personal information
- Full name: Jaele Patrick
- Born: 4 March 1988 (age 38) Lilydale, Victoria
- Height: 164 cm (65 in) (2012)
- Weight: 59 kg (130 lb) (2012)

Sport
- Sport: Diving
- Event: 3 m springboard
- College team: Texas A&M University (U.S.)
- Club: Gannets Diving Club
- Team: Victorian Institute of Sport
- Coached by: Matthew Adamson (2005-); Jay Lerew (2010-)
Medal record
Representing Australia
Commonwealth Games
Bronze medal – third place	2010 Delhi	3 m synchro springboard
Bronze medal – third place	2010 Delhi	3 m springboard
- Updated on 25 June 2012

Jaele Patrick (born 4 March 1988) is an Australian diver specialising in the women's three-metre springboard event. Starting as a gymnast at age four, she switched to diving when she was fifteen years old and attended Texas A&M on a diving scholarship. She placed 11th at the 2012 Summer Olympics.

== Personal life ==
Patrick attended Lilydale West Primary School, and then went to high school at Lilydale High School, which she graduated from in 2006. From 2007 to 2009, she attended the Australian College of Sports Therapy. From 2008 to 2012, she attended Texas A&M, where she majored in business and minored in sport management. As of 2012 she lives in College Station, Texas.

Patrick started in gymnastics when she was four years old but quit the sport because of injury when she was fifteen.

== Diving ==
Patrick is a diver, specialising in the women's three-metre springboard event. She started diving as a fifteen-year-old, following an injury, after a friend invited her to come and try the sport. She has been coached by Matthew Adamson since 2005 and Jay Lerew since 2010; both coached her going into the 2012 Summer Olympics. She has two training bases, one in Texas and one in Melbourne. In Australia, she is a member of the Gannets Diving Club and has held a scholarship with the Victorian Institute of Sport in Melbourne. As of June 2012, her best career score in the one-metre event is 360.37 and her best career score in the three-metre event is 412.35.

=== National competitions ===
In 2006, Patrick earned gold in the three-metre event and a bronze medal in the one-metre at the Australian Elite Junior Diving Championships in Brisbane. She also competed in the German Grand Prix and the Russian Grand Prix. In 2007, she finished in the top ten in the three-metre and the one-metre events in the Australian Open Diving Championships. In 2008, she finished second in the Australia national championships in the three-metre springboard. She also competed in the Italian Grand Prix. In 2009, she finished fifth in the one-metre event and eighth in the three-metre event at the Australian Open Championships in Brisbane. She finished second at the 2010 Australian Open Championships in Sydney in the one-metre springboard. She finished second in the one metre and three-metre events at the 2012 Australian Open Championships. She finished third in the three-metre-synchro event.

=== University team ===
From 2008 to 2012, Patrick was a member of the swimming and diving team at Texas A&M while on a diving scholarship. While there during her final season, her university coach was Lerew Jay. She was named the Big 12 Women's Diver of the Week twice in November 2011, twice in January 2012, and again in February 2012. She competed in diving at the university level, where she won the 2012 NCAA title in the 3m event.

=== National team ===
Patrick was a member of the Australia national development squad. She competed at the 2007 World University Games. In 2010, she competed at the FINA USA Open in Fort Lauderdale, where she finished fifth in the three-metre event, and seventh in the three-metre synchro with partner Olivia Wright. She represented Australia at the 2010 Commonwealth Games, where she earned two bronze medals, one in the three-metre and one in the three-metre synchro event with partner Olivia Wright. She finished fourth in the one-metre event. In 2011, she competed in the FINA USA Grand Prix, and won a bronze medal in the three-metre springboard at the FINA Italian Grand Prix. At the 2012 Australian trials in Adelaide, she finished second in the three-metre event.

Patrick was selected to represent Australia at the 2012 Summer Olympics in the three-metre individual springboard where she will make her Olympic debut. She finished eleventh in the three-metre event at the Fort Lauderdale Grand Prix in Florida. She finished sixteenth in the three-metre event at 2012 Montreal Grand Prix in Canada.
