= Samantha Hamill =

Australian swimmer (born 1991)

Personal information
- National team: Australia
- Born: 23 February 1991 (age 35) Melbourne, Victoria, Australia
- Height: 1.64 m (5 ft 5 in)
- Weight: 53 kg (117 lb)

Sport
- Sport: Swimming
- Strokes: Freestyle
- Club: Quad Park
Medal record
Women's swimming
Representing Australia
Commonwealth Games
Silver medal – second place	2010 Delhi	400 m individual medley

Samantha Hamill (born 23 February 1991) is an Australian competitive swimmer. She competed in the 200-metre butterfly and the 400-metre individual medley at the 2008 Summer Olympics in Beijing, and the 200-metre butterfly at the 2012 Summer Olympics in London.
