= Mahitha Mohan =

Indian cyclist

Cycling career
- Sport: Cycling
- Disciplines: Road, Track, MTB
- Role: Rider
Medal record
Representing India
Women's road cycling
South Asian Games
Gold medal – first place	2010 Dhaka	50 km Mass Start
Gold medal – first place	2010 Dhaka	Team time trial CR

Mahitha Mohan is an Indian cyclist who has competed in road, track, and mountain bike events. She has won multiple national championships and represented India in international competitions, including the South Asian Games, where she won a gold medal in the women's 50 km mass start event.

== Early life ==
Mahitha Mohan is from Kerala, India, and began competitive cycling at a young age. She began cycling in her early teens, with limited access to facilities.

== Career ==
Mohan emerged as a leading cyclist in India through her performances in national competitions across road, track, and mountain biking disciplines. She gained recognition at the 2010 South Asian Games, where she won the gold medal in the women's 50 km mass start event.

She also achieved success at the National Games, winning multiple gold medals, including in the individual road time trial and track cycling events.

Mohan's achievements came during a period when competitive cycling in India had limited infrastructure and international success. She was named India's best cyclist in 2010.

== Palmarès ==
2002
National Track Cycling Championship

(gold) Time Trial (Girls under 14)
(silver) Individual pursuit (Girls under 14)

2003
National Mountain Bike Cycling Championship

(gold) Mass Start (Girls under 16)
(bronze) Mass Start (Girls under 18)
(bronze) Time Trial (Girls under 16)

National Track Cycling Championship

(silver) Team pursuit (Girls under 18)
(bronze) Team time trial (Girls under 18)
(bronze) Individual pursuit (Girls under 16)

2004
National Mountain Bike Cycling Championship

(gold) Mass Start (Girls under 16)
(gold) Mass Start (Girls under 18)
(silver) Time Trial (Girls under 16)

National Track Cycling Championship

(silver) Team pursuit (Girls under 18)
(bronze) Team time trial (Girls under 18)

2005
National Mountain Bike Cycling Championship

(silver) Mass Start (Girls under 18)
(silver) Time Trial (Girls under 18)

2006
National Track Cycling Championship (at Patiyala)

(gold) Olympic Sprint (Girls under 19)
(silver) Mass Start (Girls under 19)
(silver) Points race (Girls under 19)
(silver) Team pursuit (Girls under 19)
(bronze) Team time trial (Girls under 19)

National Track Cycling Championship (at Bijapur)

(gold) Mass Start (Girls under 19)
(gold) Points race (Girls under 19)
(gold) Olympic Sprint (Girls under 19)
(gold) Team time trial (Girls under 19)
(silver) Points race (Women)
(bronze) Team pursuit (Girls under 19)

National Road Cycling Championship

(silver) Mass Start (Girls under 19)
(bronze) Time Trial (Girls under 19)
(bronze) Team time trial (Women)

All India Inter University Cycling Championship

(gold) Mass Start
(gold) Time Trial

2007
National Mountain Bike Cycling Championship

(silver) Mass Start (Girls under 19)

National Games of India

(bronze) Sprint
(bronze) Olympic Team Sprint

National Track Cycling Championship

(gold) Points race (Women)
(gold) Points race (Girls under 19)
(gold) Scratch race (Girls under 19)
(gold) Time Trial (Girls under 19)
(gold) Olympic Team Sprint (Women)
(silver) Sprint (Women)
(silver) Time Trial (Women)
(silver) Team pursuit (Women)
(silver) Team time trial (Women)

National Road Cycling Championship

(gold) Mass Start (Girls under 19)
(gold) Team time trial (Women)
(bronze) Time Trial (Women)

2008
All India Inter University Cycling Championship

(gold) Mass Start (Women)
(silver) Time Trial (Women)
(silver) Team pursuit (Women)
(silver) Team time trial (Women)

National Road Cycling Championship

(silver) Kriterium (Women)
(silver) Mass Start (Women)
(silver) Team time trial (Women)

2009
National Track Cycling Championship

(gold) Points race (Women)
(gold) Time Trial (Women)
(gold) Olympic Sprint (Women)
(silver) Sprint (Women)
(silver) Team pursuit (Women)
(bronze) Team time trial (Women)

All India Inter University Cycling Championship

(gold) Mass Start (Women)
(gold) Time Trial (Women)
(silver) Team time trial (Women)
(bronze) Team pursuit

2010
South Asian Games

(gold) Mass Start 50 km
(gold) Team time trial
