= Tennis at the 2010 Commonwealth Games =

- Venue: R.K. Khanna Tennis Complex
- Location: Delhi, India
- Dates: 4 to 10 October 2010

Tennis at the 2010 Commonwealth Games was the inaugural appearance of Tennis at the Commonwealth Games. The tennis competition was held at the R.K. Khanna Tennis Complex in Delhi, India, from 4 to 10 October 2010.

== Background ==
Although tennis has long been on the list of approved optional Commonwealth Games sports, and has featured in every Commonwealth Youth Games programme, it made its maiden appearance in a full Commonwealth Games programme at the 2010 Commonwealth Games.

The tennis events clashed with the dates of the China Open, an ATP World Tour 500 and WTA Tour Premier Mandatory event, which brought concerns that governing bodies would fail to persuade their top players to compete in Delhi. No male or female player in the world's top 100 ranked players competed, with the exception of world number 63 Anastasia Rodionova. India's leading player's Mahesh Bhupathi and Sania Mirza also competed.

== Medal table ==
* Host nation (India)

Rank	Nation	Gold	Silver	Bronze	Total
1	Australia	3	3	2	8
2	India*	1	1	2	4
3	Scotland	1	0	0	1
4	England	0	1	1	2
Totals (4 entries)		5	5	5	15

== Venue ==
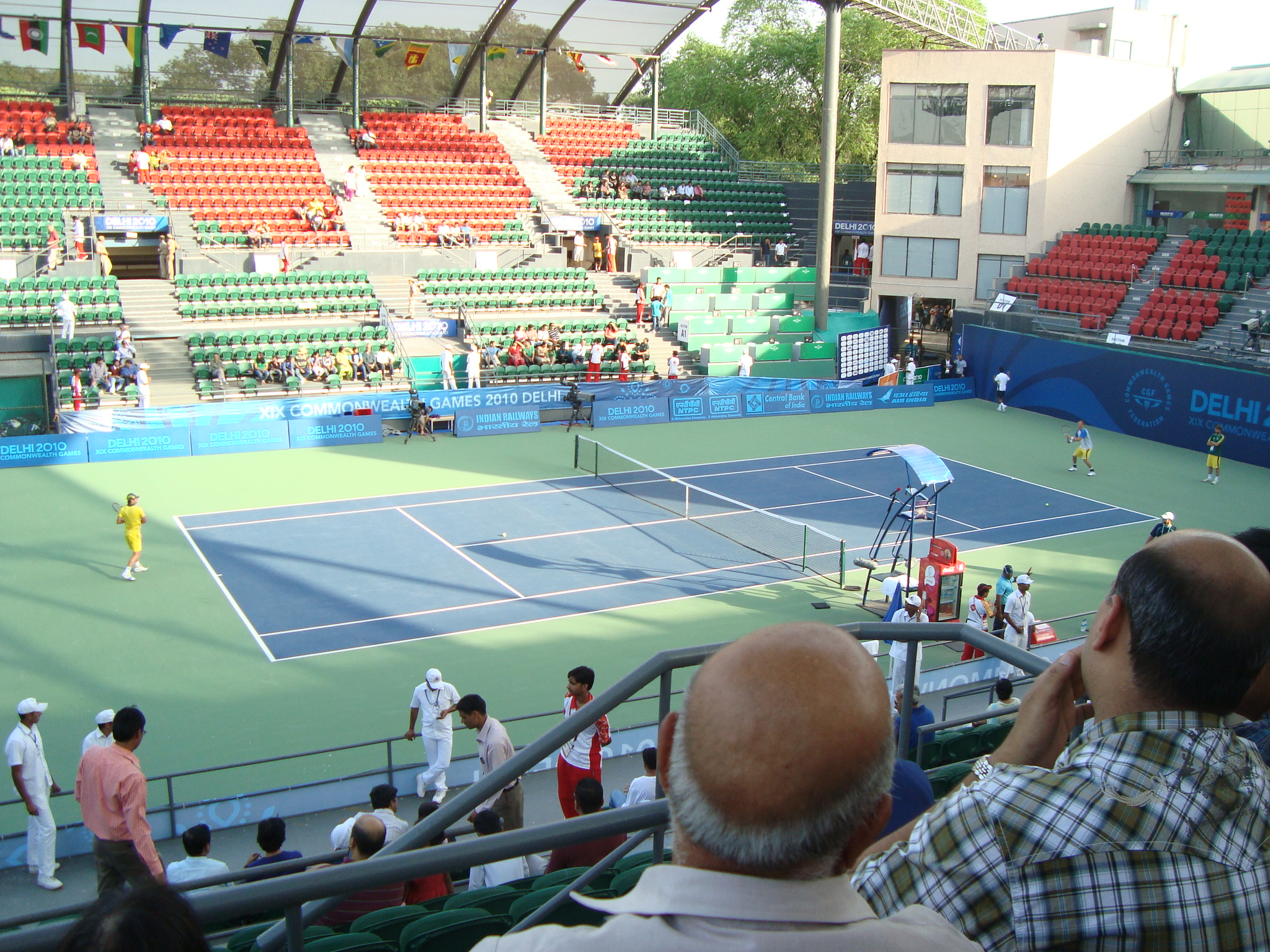
Centre court of R.K. Khanna Tennis Complex

- R.K. Khanna Tennis Complex

=== Training venues ===
- Siri Fort Sports Complex - 9 courts
- RK Khanna Tennis Stadium - 6 courts

== Medallists ==
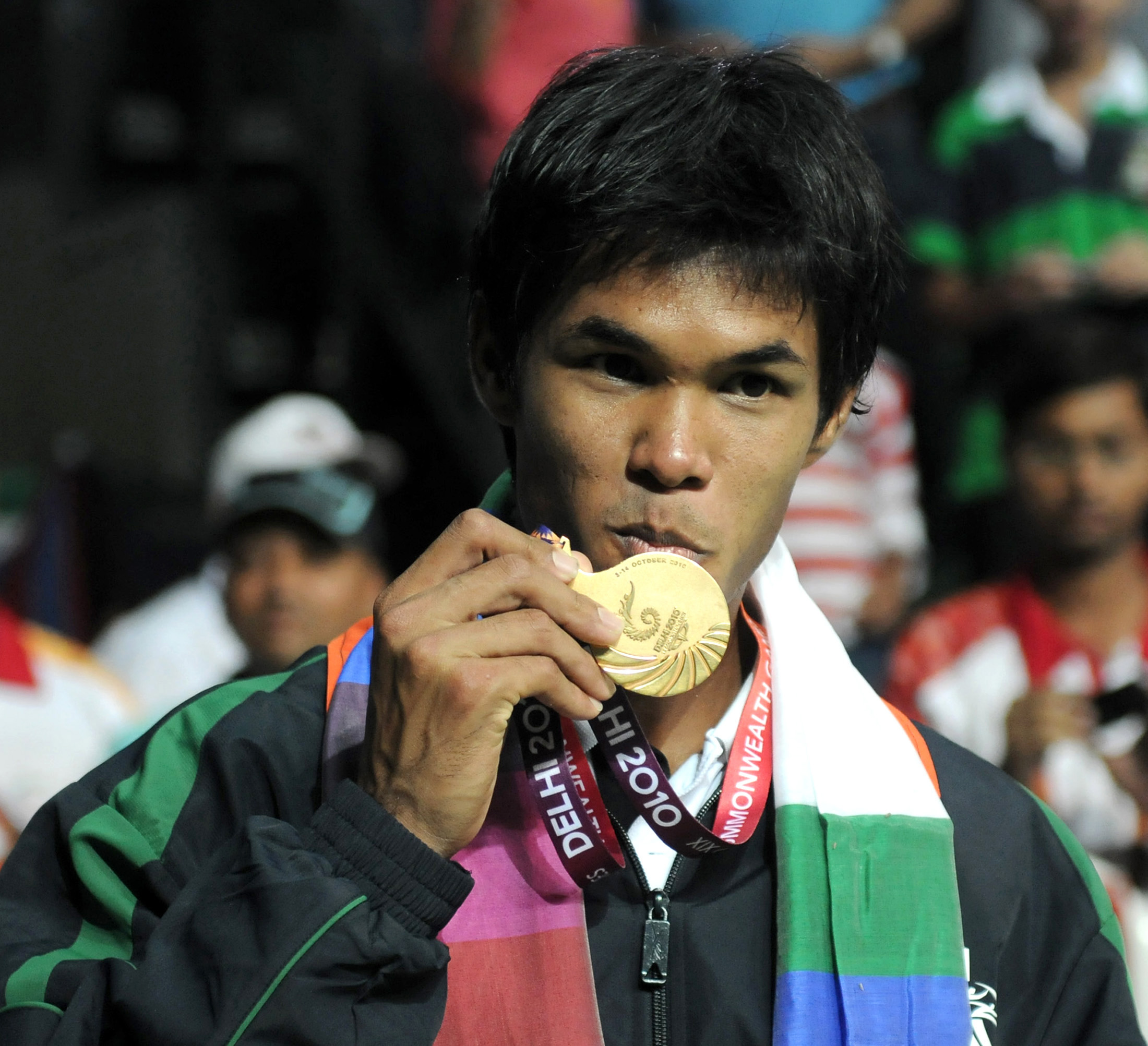
XIX Commonwealth Games-2010 Delhi Tennis (Men’s Single) Somdev Devvarman of India won Gold Medal, at R. K. Khanna Tennis Stadium, in New Delhi on October 10, 2010

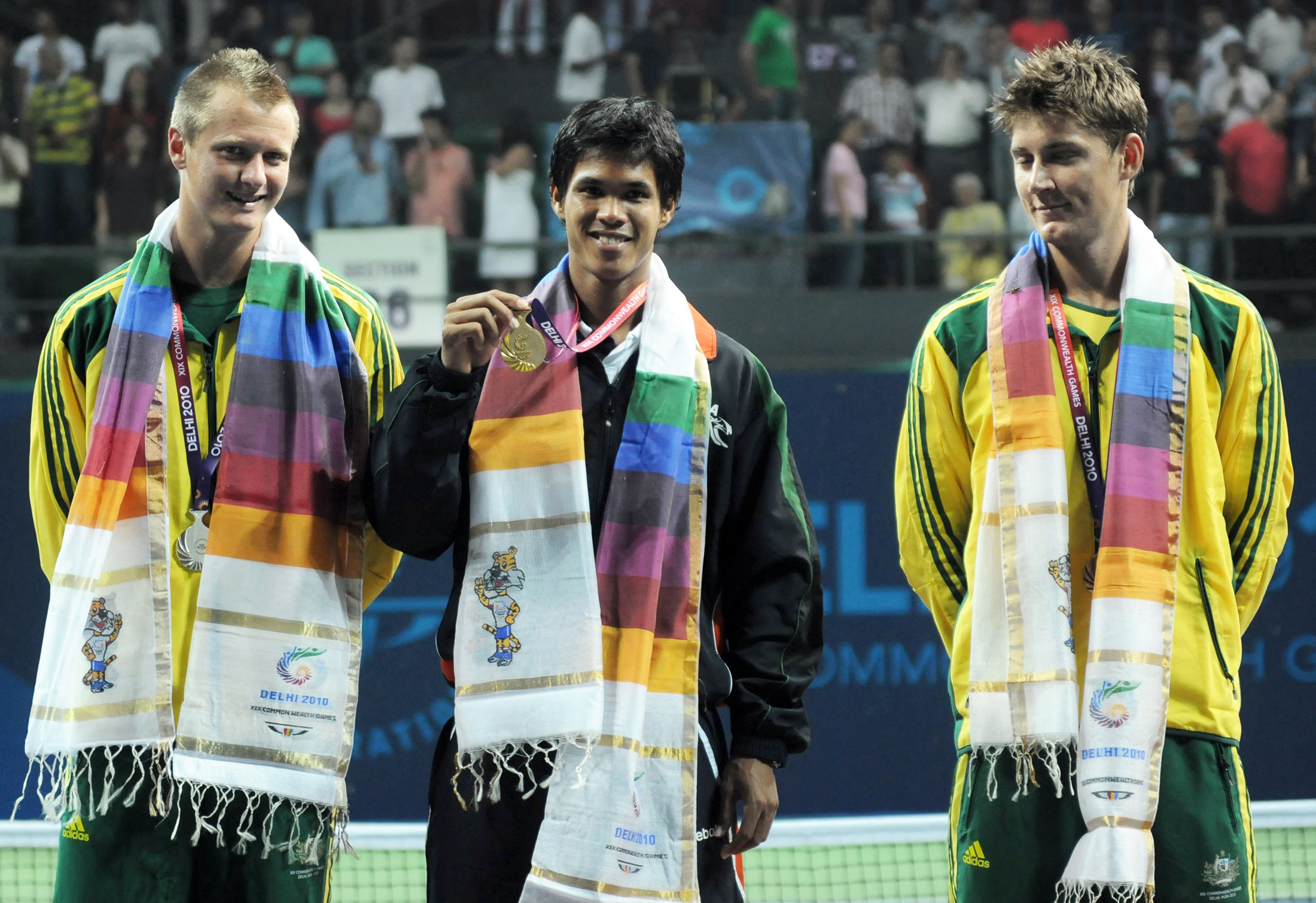
XIX Commonwealth Games-2010 Delhi Tennis (Men’s Single) Somdev Devvarman of India (Gold), Greg Jones of Australia (Silver) and Matt Ebden of Australia (Bronze), during the medal presentation ceremony

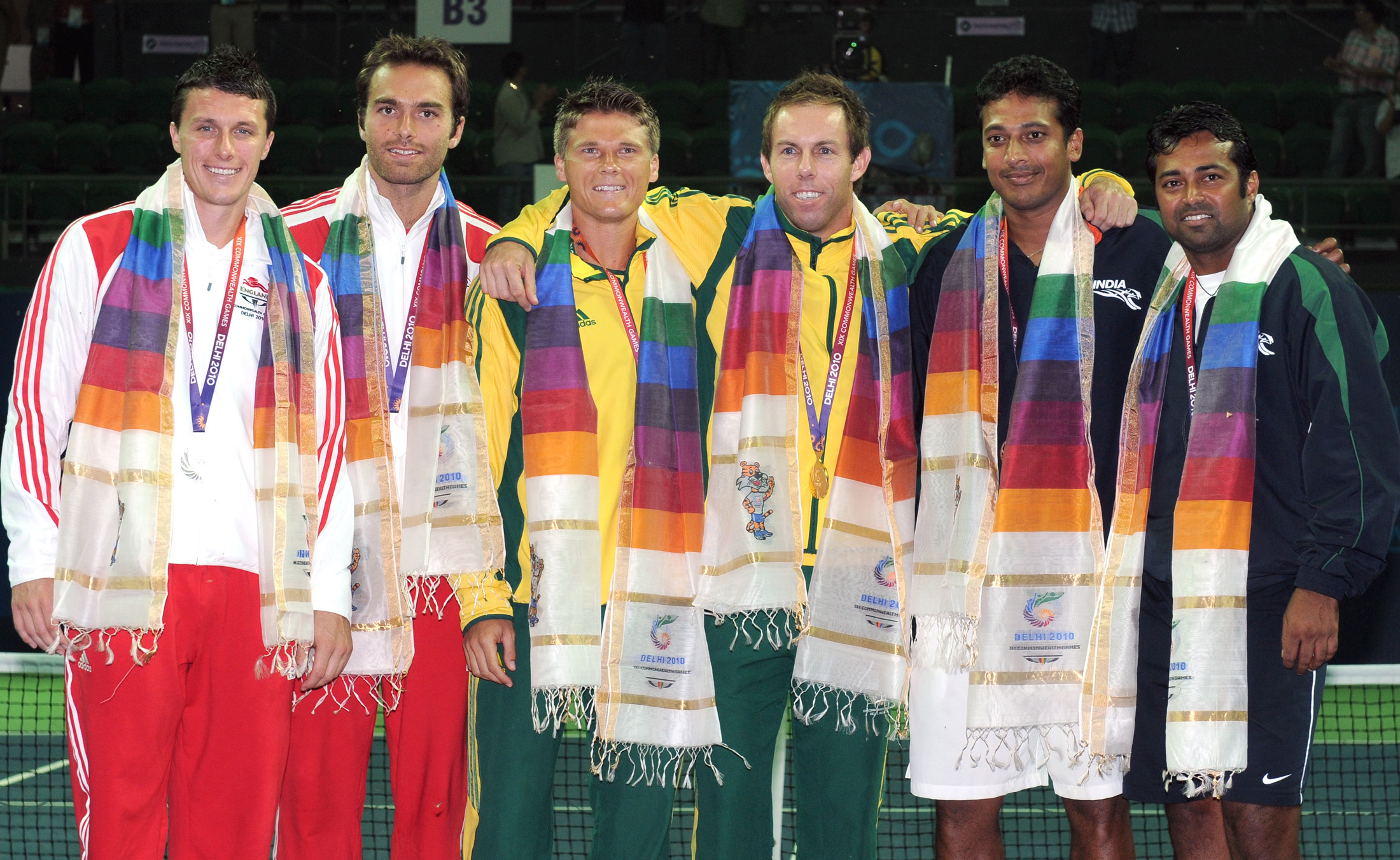
XIX Commonwealth Games-2010 Delhi Tennis (Men’s Double) Paul Hanley and Peter Luczak of Australia (Gold), Ross Hutchins and Ken Skupski of England (Silver) and Mahesh Bhupati and Leander Paes of India (Bronze)

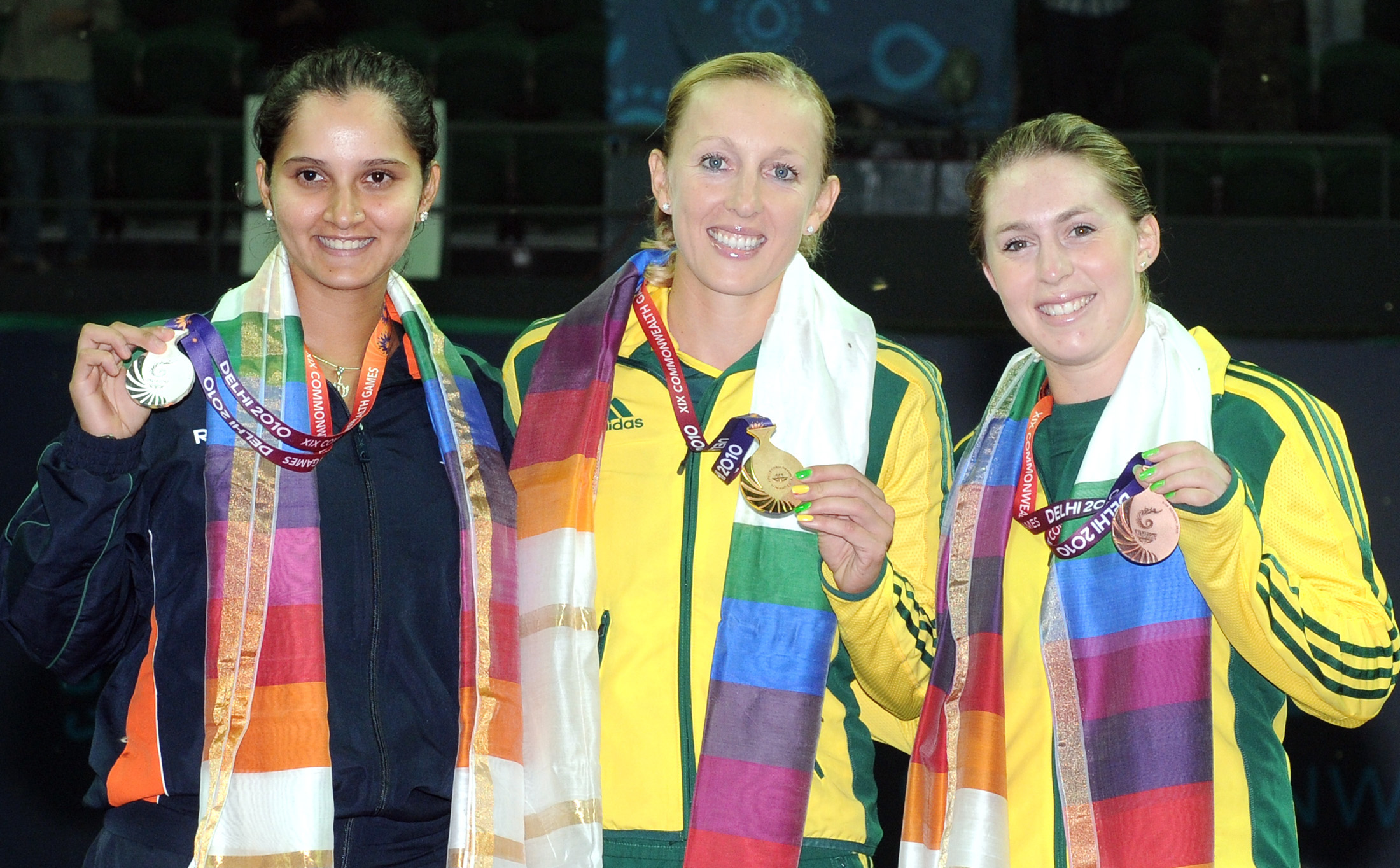
XIX Commonwealth Games-2010 Delhi Tennis (Women’s Singles) Anastasia Rodionova of Australia (Gold), Sania Mirza of India (Silver) and Sally Peers of Australia (Bronze) during the medal presentation ceremony

Event	Gold	Silver	Bronze
Men's singles	Somdev Devvarman; India	Greg Jones; Australia	Matthew Ebden; Australia
Men's doubles	Paul Hanley and Peter Luczak; Australia	Ross Hutchins and Ken Skupski; England	Mahesh Bhupathi and Leander Paes; India
Women's singles	Anastasia Rodionova; Australia	Sania Mirza; India	Sally Peers; Australia
Women's doubles	Anastasia Rodionova and Sally Peers; Australia	Olivia Rogowska and Jessica Moore; Australia	Sania Mirza and Rushmi Chakravarthi; India
Mixed doubles	Jocelyn Rae and Colin Fleming; Scotland	Anastasia Rodionova and Paul Hanley; Australia	Sarah Borwell and Ken Skupski; England

== Participating nations ==
A total of 23 nations were represented by at least one player in either the men's singles, women's singles, men's doubles, women's doubles, or mixed doubles.

Nation	Men		Women		Mixed	Total
Nation	Singles	Doubles	Singles	Doubles	Mixed	Total
Australia	3	4(1)	3	4(1)	4	8
Bahamas	3	2	2	2	2	5
Barbados	2	2				2
Bermuda	2	2	2	2	2	4
Cook Islands			1			1
England	3	4(1)	2	2	4	7
Guernsey	1		1		2	2
Gibraltar			1			1
India	2	4(2)	3	4(1)	4	8
Kiribati			2	2		2
Kenya	1	2(1)				2
Lesotho			2	2		2
Maldives			2	2		2
Mauritius	1		1		2	2
New Zealand	1		1		2	2
Pakistan	2	2				2
Saint Lucia	1		1		2	2
Saint Vincent and the Grenadines			1			1
Scotland	2	2	1	2(1)	4	4
Solomon Islands	1					1
Sri Lanka	3	4(1)	1		2	5
Uganda	2	2	1		4(1)	3
Wales	2	2				2

- Number in brackets = players participating only in doubles
