= Tennis at the 2010 Commonwealth Games – Men's singles =

Men's singles
- Tennis at the 2010 Commonwealth Games

Events
Singles	men	women
Doubles	men	women	mixed
- Commonwealth Games

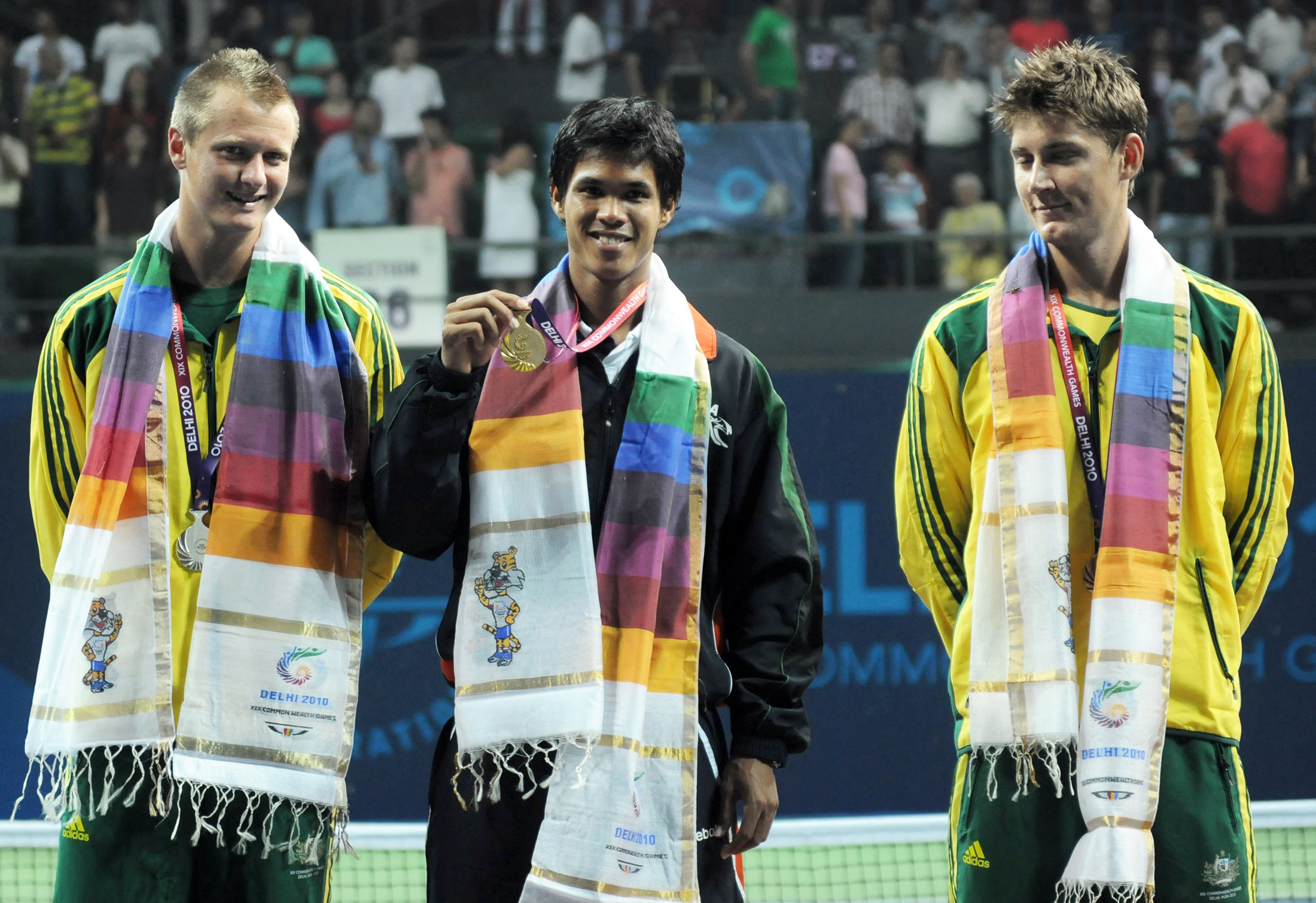
XIX Commonwealth Games-2010 Delhi Tennis (Men’s Single) Somdev Devvarman of India (Gold), Greg Jones of Australia (Silver) and Matt Ebden of Australia (Bronze), during the medal presentation ceremony

This was the first edition of tennis at the Commonwealth Games. The competition was won by top seed, Somdev Devvarman of India, who beat Greg Jones of Australia 6-4, 6-2 in the final.

== Medalists ==
Gold	Somdev Devvarman; India
Silver	Greg Jones; Australia
Bronze	Matthew Ebden; Australia

== Seeds ==
1. Somdev Devvarman (IND) (champion, gold medalist)
2. Peter Luczak (AUS) (semifinals, fourth place)
3. Matthew Ebden (AUS) (semifinals, bronze medalist)
4. James Ward (ENG) (quarterfinals)
5. Greg Jones (AUS) (final, silver medalist)
6. Jose Statham (NZL) (quarterfinals)
7. Josh Goodall (ENG) (quarterfinals)
8. Joshua Milton (WAL) (quarterfinals)

== Main draw ==
Key

- Q = Qualifier
- WC = Wild card
- LL = Lucky loser
- Alt = Alternate
- ITF = ITF entry
- PR = Protected ranking
- SR = Special ranking
- SE = Special exempt
- JE = Junior exempt
- JR = Junior Accelerator Programme entrant
- CO = College Accelerator Programme entrant
- NG = Next Gen Accelerator Program entrant
- w/o = Walkover
- r = Retired
- d = Defaulted

=== Finals ===
Semifinals
1	Somdev Devvarman (IND)	6	6
3	Matthew Ebden (AUS)	3	1
5	Greg Jones (AUS)	6^{4}	6	6
2	Peter Luczak (AUS)	7^{7}	4	2

Final (gold-medal match)
1	Somdev Devvarman (IND)	6	6
5	Greg Jones (AUS)	4	2
Bronze-medal match
3	Matthew Ebden (AUS)	6	6
2	Peter Luczak (AUS)	3	3

=== Top half ===
First round
1	Somdev Devvarman (IND)	6	6
Devin Mullings (BAH)	4	2
David Thomas (BER)	1	2
Ruchika Jayawickreme (SRI)	6	6
Christopher Lewis (WAL)	7	5	1
Colin Fleming (SCO)	5	7	6
Haydn Lewis (BAR)	2	1
6	Jose Statham (NZL)	6	6
3	Matthew Ebden (AUS)	6	6
Patrick Ogier (GUE)	3	2
Duncan Mugabe (UGA)	2	6^{5}
Aisam-ul-Haq Qureshi (PAK)	6	7^{7}
Thangarajah Dineshkanthan (SRI)	6	1	0
Marvin Rolle (BAH)	2	6	6
Alberton Richelieu (LCA)	2	2
7	Josh Goodall (ENG)	6	6

Second round
1	S Devvarman (IND)	6	6
R Jayawickreme (SRI)	0	1
C Fleming (SCO)	4	r
6	J Statham (NZL)	6
3	M Ebden (AUS)	6	7
A-u-H Qureshi (PAK)	4	5
M Rolle (BAH)	4	3
7	J Goodall (ENG)	6	6

Quarterfinals
1	S Devvarman (IND)	6	6
6	J Statham (NZL)	3	4
3	M Ebden (AUS)	6^{3}	6	7^{7}
7	J Goodall (ENG)	7^{7}	1	6^{3}

Semifinals
1	S Devvarman (IND)	6	6
3	M Ebden (AUS)	3	1

=== Bottom half ===
First round
5	Greg Jones (AUS)	6	6
Gavin Manders (BER)	1	2
Kamil Patel (MRI)	4	1
Harshana Godamanna (SRI)	6	6
Jamie Murray (SCO)	6	7
Rodney Carey (BAH)	2	5
Michael Leong (SOL)	1	1
4	James Ward (ENG)	6	6
8	Joshua Milton (WAL)	6	6
Francis Mwangi (KEN)	0	2
Ross Hutchins (ENG)	6	7^{7}
Aqeel Khan (PAK)	2	6^{3}
Rohan Bopanna (IND)	6	6
Robert Buyinza (UGA)	1	4
Darian King (BAR)	3	3
2	Peter Luczak (AUS)	6	6

Second round
5	G Jones (AUS)	7^{7}	6
H Godamanna (SRI)	6^{1}	2
J Murray (SCO)	5	0
4	J Ward (ENG)	7	6
8	J Milton (WAL)	6	6
R Hutchins (ENG)	4	2
R Bopanna (IND)	2	6^{5}
2	P Luczak (AUS)	6	7^{7}

Quarterfinals
5	G Jones (AUS)	6	6
4	J Ward (ENG)	3	2
8	J Milton (WAL)	6	2	0
2	P Luczak (AUS)	4	6	6

Semifinals
5	G Jones (AUS)	6^{4}	6	6
2	P Luczak (AUS)	7^{7}	4	2
