= Tennis at the 2010 Commonwealth Games – Mixed doubles =

Mixed doubles
- Tennis at the 2010 Commonwealth Games

Events
| Singles | men | women |
| Doubles | men | women | mixed |
- Commonwealth Games

This was the first ever Commonwealth tournament held, and Anastasia Rodionova and Paul Hanley of Australia were the top seeds. However they lost the final to Jocelyn Rae and Colin Fleming of Scotland 7–6, 6–7, 6–2.

== Medalists ==
| Gold | Jocelyn Rae / Colin Fleming; Scotland |
| Silver | Anastasia Rodionova / Paul Hanley; Australia |
| Bronze | Sarah Borwell / Ken Skupski; England |

== Seeds ==
1. Anastasia Rodionova / Paul Hanley (AUS) (final, silver medalists)
2. Sania Mirza / Leander Paes (IND) (quarterfinals)
3. Sarah Borwell / Ken Skupski (ENG) (semifinals, bronze medalists)
4. Anna Smith / Ross Hutchins (ENG) (semifinals, fourth place)

== Main draw ==
Key

- Q = Qualifier
- WC = Wild card
- LL = Lucky loser
- Alt = Alternate
- ITF = ITF entry
- PR = Protected ranking
- SR = Special ranking
- SE = Special exempt
- JE = Junior exempt
- JR = Junior Accelerator Programme entrant
- CO = College Accelerator Programme entrant
- NG = Next Gen Accelerator Program entrant
- w/o = Walkover
- r = Retired
- d = Defaulted

=== Finals ===
Semifinals
1 | Anastasia Rodionova (AUS); Paul Hanley (AUS) | 6 | 3 | 7
3 | Sarah Borwell (ENG); Ken Skupski (ENG) | 4 | 6 | 6
4 | Anna Smith (ENG); Ross Hutchins (ENG) | 3 | 6 | 5
Jocelyn Rae (SCO); Colin Fleming (SCO) | 6 | 1 | 7

Final (gold-medal match)
1 | Anastasia Rodionova (AUS); Paul Hanley (AUS) | 6^{7} | 7 | 2
Jocelyn Rae (SCO); Colin Fleming (SCO) | 7 | 6^{2} | 6
Bronze-medal match
3 | Sarah Borwell (ENG); Ken Skupski (ENG) | 4 | 6 | 6
4 | Anna Smith (ENG); Ross Hutchins (ENG) | 6 | 3 | 2

=== Top half ===
First round
1 | A Rodionova (AUS); P Hanley (AUS) | 6 | 3 | 6
N Sanjeev (IND); R Bopanna (IND) | 3 | 6 | 3
J Nanfuka (UGA); D Mugabe (UGA) | 2 | 4
M Brown (SCO); J Murray (SCO) | 6 | 6
3 | S Borwell (ENG); K Skupski (ENG) | 6 | 7
M Erakovic (NZL); R Statham (NZL) | 2 | 6
L Russell (BAH); M Rolle (BAH) | 7 | 4 | 5
H Watson (GUE); P Ogier (GUE) | 6 | 6 | 7

Quarterfinals
1 | A Rodionova (AUS); P Hanley (AUS) | 6 | 6
M Brown (SCO); J Murray (SCO) | 3 | 4
3 | S Borwell (ENG); K Skupski (ENG) | 6 | 6
H Watson (GUE); P Ogier (GUE) | 0 | 1

Semifinals
1 | A Rodionova (AUS); P Hanley (AUS) | 6 | 3 | 7
3 | S Borwell (ENG); K Skupski (ENG) | 4 | 6 | 6

=== Bottom half ===
First round
S Ghosh (MRI); K Patel (MRI) | 6 | 7
A Muttiah (SRI); H Godamanna (SRI) | 4 | 6
T Lambert (BER); D Thomas (BER) | 1 | 2
4 | A Smith (ENG); R Hutchins (ENG) | 6 | 6
S Peers (AUS); M Ebden (AUS) | 6 | 3 | 1
J Rae (SCO); C Fleming (SCO) | 3 | 6 | 6
S Roheman (LCA); A Richelieu (LCA) | 0 | 1
2 | S Mirza (IND); L Paes (IND) | 6 | 6

Quarterfinals
S Ghosh (MRI); K Patel (MRI) | 2 | 2
4 | A Smith (ENG); R Hutchins (ENG) | 6 | 6
J Rae (SCO); C Fleming (SCO) | 7 | 6
2 | S Mirza (IND); L Paes (IND) | 5 | 4

Semifinals
4 | A Smith (ENG); R Hutchins (ENG) | 3 | 6 | 5
J Rae (SCO); C Fleming (SCO) | 6 | 1 | 7
