= Guernsey at the 2010 Commonwealth Games =

- CGF code: GUE
- CGA: Guernsey Commonwealth Games Association
- Website: guernseycga.org.gg

in Delhi, India
- Competitors: 45 in 10 sports
- Flag bearers: Opening: Closing:
- Medals: Gold 0 Silver 0 Bronze 0 Total 0

Commonwealth Games appearances (overview)
- 1970; 1974; 1978; 1982; 1986; 1990; 1994; 1998; 2002; 2006; 2010; 2014; 2018; 2022; 2026; 2030

Guernsey competed in the 2010 Commonwealth Games held in Delhi, India, from 3 to 14 October 2010.

== Aquatics ==
=== Swimming ===
Team Guernsey consists of 6 swimmers.

Xander Beaton, Thomas Hollingsworth, Ian Hubert, Ben Lowndes, Jeremy Osborne, Ian Powell.

== Athletics ==
Team Guernsey consists of 8 athletes.

Matthew Bailey, Tom Druce, Dale Garland, Helen Hadjam, Lee Merrien, Kylie Robilliard, Hywel Robinson, Nathan Stevens.

== Badminton ==
Team Guernsey consists of 2 badminton players.

Elena Johnson, Gayle Lloyd.

Women's Singles

Player(s)	Round of 64	Round of 32	Round of 16	Quarter Final	Semi Final	Final	Rank
Player(s)	Opposition Result	Opposition Result	Opposition Result	Opposition Result	Opposition Result	Opposition Result	Rank
Elena Johnson	(Ghana) Hammond (GHA); W 21-4 21-6	(Wales) Turner (WAL); W 25-23 19–21 24-22	(Malaysia) Wong (MAS); L 5-21 10–21	Did Not Advance			-
Gayle Lloyd	(Kenya) Joseph (KEN); W 21-10 22-20	(Uganda) Nakalyango (UGA); W 21-10 21-13	(Canada) Rice (CAN); L 4-21 7-21	Did Not Advance			-

Women's Doubles

Player(s)	Round of 32	Round of 16	Quarter Final	Semi Final	Final	Rank
Player(s)	Opposition Result	Opposition Result	Opposition Result	Opposition Result	Opposition Result	Rank
Elena Johnson & Gayle Lloyd	(Ghana) Amasah & Hammond (GHA); W 21–11 21–12	(New Zealand) Barry & Haliday (NZL); L 13-21 15–21	Did Not Advance			-

== Cycling ==
Team Guernsey consists of 4 cyclists.

=== Road ===
==== Men ====
Event	Cyclist(s)	Time	Rank
40 km Time Trial	Josh Gosselin	57:16.82	24
40 km Time Trial	Tobyn Horton	58:03.74	27
40 km Time Trial	James McLaughlin	54:55.17	17
167 km Road Race	Josh Gosselin	59:05.13	46
167 km Road Race	Tobyn Horton	3:55:12	27
167 km Road Race	James McLaughlin	3:54:11	20

==== Women ====
Event	Cyclist(s)	Time	Rank
29 km Time Trial	Ann Bowditch	46:18.32	19
112 km Road Race	Ann Bowditch	3:08:44	38

== Lawn Bowls ==
Team Guernsey consists of 9 lawn bowls players.

Donald Batiste, Lucy Beere, Garry Collins, Daniel De La Mare, Gwen De La Mare, Matthew Le Ber, Alison Merrien, Ian Merrien, Gary Pitschou.

== Shooting ==
Team Guernsey consists of 2 shooters.

Adam Jory, Peter Jory.

== Squash ==
Team Guernsey consists of 5 squash players. Henry Birch, Zephanie Curgenven, Natalie Dodd, Issey Norman-Ross, Chris Simpson.

Men's Singles

Player(s)	Round of 64	Round of 32	Round of 16	Quarter Final	Semi Final	Final	Rank
Player(s)	Opposition Result	Opposition Result	Opposition Result	Opposition Result	Opposition Result	Opposition Result	Rank
Chris Simpson	(Malawi) Taulo (MAW); W 11-4 11-3 11-1	(New Zealand) Knight (NZL); W 11–8 11–4 12–14; 11–3	(England) Selby (ENG); L 9–11 5-11 5-11	-	-	-	-
Henry Birch	(Canada) Delierre (CAN); L 4-11 9-11 7-11	Plate; Round of 32: (Botswana) Mosope (BOT); W W/O	Plate; Round of 16: (Scotland) Small (SCO); L 3-11 5–11 3–11	Consolation Plate; Quarter Final: (Bermuda) Kyme (BER); L 5-11 7-11 4-11	-	-	-

Women's Singles

Player(s)	Round of 64	Round of 32	Round of 16	Quarter Final	Semi Final	Final	Rank
Player(s)	Opposition Result	Opposition Result	Opposition Result	Opposition Result	Opposition Result	Opposition Result	Rank
Zephanie Curgenven	BYE	(England) Duncalf (ENG); L 4-11 3-11 1-11	Plate; Round of 16: (India) Alankamony (IND); L 4–11 11–3 13-11; 4-11 9-11	Consolation Plate; Quarter Final: (Kenya) Madhani (KEN); W 11–2 11–3 11–7	Consolation Plate; Semi Final: (India) Misra (IND); W W/O	Consolation Plate; Final: (India) Reddy (IND); L 5–11 5–11 11–5; 11-6 6-11	2nd Consolation Plate
Natalie Dodd	(Canada) Edmison (CAN); L5-11 1-11 5-11	Plate; Round of 16: (Australia) Pittock (AUS); L 3-11 3-11 1-11	Consolation Plate; Round of 16: (Guyana) Khalil (GUY); W W/O	Consolation Plate; Quarter Final: (Sri Lanka) Udangawe (SRI); L 7-11 6–11 11–8; 11-4 0-11	-	-	-
Issey Norman-Ross	(Trinidad and Tobago) Sample (TRI); W W/O	(Malaysia) Arnold (MAS); L 5-11 4-11 5-11	Plate; Round 1: (Canada) Cornett (CAN); L 10-12 5-11 3-11	Consolation Plate; Quarter Final: (India) Reddy (IND); L 7-11 10-12 9–11	-	-	-

Women's Doubles

Player(s)	Pool Match 1	Pool Match 2	Round of 16	Quarter Final	Semi Final	Final	Rank
Player(s)	Opposition Result	Opposition Result	Opposition Result	Opposition Result	Opposition Result	Opposition Result	Rank
Zephanie Curgenven & Issey Norman-Ross	(New Zealand) Hawkes & King (NZL); L 1-11 1-11	(Scotland) Aitken & Gillen-Buchert (SCO); L 4-11 1-11	-	-	-	-	-

Mixed Doubles

Player(s)	Pool Match 1	Pool Match 2	Round of 16	Quarter Final	Semi Final	Final	Rank
Player(s)	Opposition Result	Opposition Result	Opposition Result	Opposition Result	Opposition Result	Opposition Result	Rank
Zephanie Curgenven & Henry Birch	(England) Kippax & Grant (ENG); L 5-11 5-11	(Sri Lanka) Guruge & Samarasinghe (SRI); W 11–3 11–9	(England) Duncalf & Willstrop (ENG); L 4-11 2-11	-	-	-	-

== Table Tennis ==
Liam James Robilliard, Kay Chivers, Garry Dodd, Oliver Langlois, Alice Loveridge, Dawn Morgan, Matthew Stubbington, Coach: Lloyd Doyley (Guernsey) (Greenway School PE teacher).

Men's Singles

Player(s)	Qualifying	Qualifying	Round of 64	Round of 32	Round of 16	Quarter Final	Semi Final	Final	Rank
Player(s)	Opposition Result	Opposition Result	Opposition Result	Opposition Result	Opposition Result	Opposition Result	Opposition Result	Opposition Result	Rank
Garry Dodd	(Uganda) Mafabi (UGA); W 9-11 11-9 14-12; 11-2 11-2	(Jamaica) Dibbs (JAM); W 11-9 13-11 8-11; 11-7 12-10	(Cyprus) Yiangou (CYP); L 5-11 5-11 5-11; 9-11	-	-	-	-	-	-
Olly Langlois	(Vanuatu) Shing (VAN); W 10-12 5-11 11-7; 11-5 11-9 5-11; 11-4	(Barbados) Farley (BAR); W 11-6 11-9 11-6; 11-6	(South Africa) Overmeyer (RSA); L 5–11 1-11 9-11; 6-11	-	-	-	-	-	-
Matt Stubbington	(Maldives) Saeed (MDV); L 9-11 11–3 11–8; 6-11 3-11 12-14	(Malaysia) Mao (MAS); L 5-11 10-12 6-11; 9-11	-	-	-	-	-	-	-

Women's Singles

Player(s)	Qualifying	Qualifying	Qualifying	Round of 64	Round of 32	Round of 16	Quarter Final	Semi Final	Final	Rank
Player(s)	Opposition Result	Opposition Result	Opposition Result	Opposition Result	Opposition Result	Opposition Result	Opposition Result	Opposition Result	Opposition Result	Rank
Alice Loveridge	(Sri Lanka) Sahabandu (SRI); W 11-6 11-9 11-8; 9-11 11-7	(Northern Ireland) Givan (NIR); W 12-10 11-6 11-8; 10-12 11-6	-	(Nigeria) Effiom (NGR); L 11-8 11-8 13-15; 11-5 8-11 10-12; 6-11	-	-	-	-	-	-
Kay Chivers	(Uganda) Lukaaya (UGA); L 14-12 11-9 8-11; 11-5 9-11 7-11; 7-11	(Maldives) Mohamed (MDV); W 11-9 11-7 12-10; 11-3	(Australia) Chen Xi (AUS); L 8–11 5-11 3-11; 4-11	-	-	-	-	-	-	-
Dawn Morgan	(Mauritius) Newaj (MRI); W 11-5 7-11 10-12; 11-4 11-9 11-5	(New Zealand) Yang (NZL); L 2-11 12-14 7-11; 4-11	-	-	-	-	-	-	-	-

Men's Doubles

Player(s)	Event	Round of 64	Round of 32	Round of 16	Quarter Final	Semi Final	Final	Rank
Player(s)	Event	Opposition Result	Opposition Result	Opposition Result	Opposition Result	Opposition Result	Opposition Result	Rank
Garry Dodd & Olly Langlois	Men's Doubles	(Tanzania) Swenhele & Mtalaso (TAN); W 11-6 11-6 11-3	(Australia) Frank & Henzell (AUS); L 6-11 5-11 4-11	-	-	-	-	-

Women's Doubles

Player(s)	Event	Round of 32	Round of 16	Quarter Final	Semi Final	Final	Rank
Player(s)	Event	Opposition Result	Opposition Result	Opposition Result	Opposition Result	Opposition Result	Rank
Alice Loveridge & Kay Chivers	Women's Doubles	(Ghana) Owusu-Agyei & Ketu (GHA); L 7-11 11-8 4-11 8-11	-	-	-	-	-

Mixed Doubles

Player(s)	Event	Round of 64	Round of 32	Round of 16	Quarter Final	Semi Final	Final	Rank
Player(s)	Event	Opposition Result	Opposition Result	Opposition Result	Opposition Result	Opposition Result	Opposition Result	Rank
Garry Dodd & Alice Loveridge	Mixed Doubles	(Tanzania) Mtalaso & Kikwa (TAN); W 11-1 11-1 11-4	(Singapore) Yang & Wang (SIN); L 3-11 1-11 3-11	-	-	-	-	-
Matt Stubbington & Kay Chivers	Mixed Doubles	(Nigeria) Ajetunmobi & Atinuke (NGR); L 5-11 11-13 7-11	-	-	-	-	-	-
Olly Langlois & Dawn Morgan	Mixed Doubles	(Singapore) Pang & Yu (SIN); L 6-11 7-11 6-11	-	-	-	-	-	-

Men's Team

Garry Dodd, Olly Langlois, Matthew Stubbington

	Pool Game 1	Pool Game 2	Pool Game 3	Classification (13-28)	Classification (13-20)	Classification (13-16)	Classification (13-14)	Rank
	Opposition Result	Opposition Result	Opposition Result	Opposition Result	Opposition Result	Opposition Result	Opposition Result	Rank
Opponents	Singapore	Maldives	Sri Lanka	Saint Lucia	Malawi	Uganda	Mauritius	14th
Match 1	(Guernsey) Dodd v (Singapore) Gao; L 2-11 4-11 4-11	(Guernsey) Dodd v (Maldives) Zahir; W 11–0 11-4 11–6	(Guernsey) Dodd v (Sri Lanka) Jayasingha; W 9-11 11–7 14–12; 11-7	(Guernsey) Langlois v (Saint Lucia) Wells; W 11-13 11-8 11-8; 8-11 11-9	(Guernsey) Dodd v (Malawi) Somba; W 11-8 11-5 11-6	(Guernsey) Dodd v (Uganda) Mafabi W 11-9 11-9 11-3	(Guernsey) Dodd v (Mauritius) Li Kim Wa W 11-8 11-5 12-10	14th
Match 2	(Guernsey) Langlois v (Singapore) Ma; L 8-11 1–11 1-11	(Guernsey) Langlois v (Maldives) Saeed; W 16-18 11-4 4-11; 11-2 11-8	(Guernsey) Langlois v (Sri Lanka) Manamendra; L 3–11 20–22 11–3; 10-12	(Guernsey) Dodd v (Saint Lucia) Ferdinand; W 11-3 9-11 11-5; 11-3	(Guernsey) Langlois v (Malawi) Massah; W 11-1 12-14 11-5; 11-4	(Guernsey) Langlois v (Uganda) Nyaika; W 11-8 11-1 11-6	(Guernsey) Langlois v (Mauritius) Taucoory; L 11-6 5-11 10-12; 11-7 8-11	14th
Match 3	(Guernsey) Stubbington v (Singapore) Yang; L 3-11 5–11 2–11	(Guernsey) Stubbington v (Maldives) Naseem; W 11–6 11-4 11–7	(Guernsey) Stubbington v (Sri Lanka) Deshappriya; L 11–9 3-11 3–11; 6–11	(Guernsey) Stubbington v (Saint Lucia) Pierre; W 11-6 11-7 11-8	(Guernsey) Stubbington v (Malawi) Chaikah; W 11-4 11-9 11-6	(Guernsey) Stubbington v (Uganda) Kajubi; W 11-5 11-7 14-12	(Guernsey) Stubbington v (Mauritius) Chan Yook Fo; L 5-11 6-11 10-12	14th
Match 4	-	-	(Guernsey) Dodd v (Sri Lanka) Manamendra; L 12–10 6-11 11–5; 5-11 4-11	-	-	-	(Guernsey) Dodd v (Mauritius) Taucoory; W 4-11 10-12 11-6; 14-12 11-9	14th
Match 5	-	-	-	-	-	-	(Guernsey) Langlois v (Mauritius) Li Kim Wa; L 5-11 9-11 15-17	14th
Result	L 0-3	W 3–0	L 1-3	W 3-0	W 3-0	W 3-0	L 2-3	14th

Women's Team

Alice Loveridge, Dawn Morgan, Kay Chivers

	Pool Game 1	Pool Game 2	Pool Game 3	Classification (9-16)	Classification (9-12)	Classification (11-12)	Rank
	Opposition Result	Opposition Result	Opposition Result	Opposition Result	Opposition Result	Opposition Result	Rank
Opponents	Singapore	Tanzania	Canada	Maldives	Wales	Sri Lanka	12th
Match 1	(Guernsey) Loveridge v (Singapore) Sun; L 2-11 4-11 1-11	(Guernsey) Loveridge v (Tanzania) Kikwa; W 11-9 11–4 11–6	(Guernsey) Morgan v (Canada) Zhang; L 6-11 4-11 5-11	(Guernsey) Loveridge v (Maldives) Nimal; W 9-11 11-5 11-3; 11-7	(Guernsey) Morgan v (Wales) Carey; L 6-11 12-14 10-12	(Guernsey) Morgan v (Sri Lanka) Manikku Badu L 5-11 7-11 3-11	12th
Match 2	(Guernsey) Morgan v (Singapore) Li; L 5-11 4–11 3-11	(Guernsey) Morgan v (Tanzania) Mohamed; W 11-5 10-12 11–7; 11-6	(Guernsey) Loveridge v (Canada) Yuen; W 11-7 11-6 5-11; 11-8	(Guernsey) Morgan v (Maldives) Mohamed; L 10-12 11-4 9-11; 6-11	(Guernsey) Loveridge v (Wales) Phillips; W 12-10 11-9 11-7	(Guernsey) Loveridge v (Sri Lanka) Gonapinuwala; W 8-11 11-6 11-7; 12-10	12th
Match 3	(Guernsey) Chivers v (Singapore) Yu; L 4-11 4–11 1–11	(Guernsey) Chivers v (Tanzania) Mwaisyula; W 11–8 11-6 11-4	(Guernsey) Chivers v (Canada) Luo; L 3-11 3-11 5-11	(Guernsey) Chivers v (Maldives) Ibrahim; W 11-6 11-4 11-6	(Guernsey) Chivers v (Wales) Owen; L 3-11 2-11 1-11	(Guernsey) Chivers v (Sri Lanka) Sahabandu; L 8-11 5-11 8-11	12th
Match 4	-	-	(Guernsey) Loveridge v (Canada) Zhang; L 4-11 11-13 3-11	(Guernsey) Loveridge v (Maldives) Mohamed; W 15-13 11-6 9-11; 11-8	(Guernsey) Loveridge v (Wales) Carey; L 10-12 11-7 8-11; 11-3 11-13	(Guernsey) Loveridge v (Sri Lanka) Manikku Badu; L 7-11 9-11 9-11	12th
Match 5	-	-	-	-	-	-	12th
Result	L 0-3	W 3–0	L 1-3	W 3-1	L 1-3	L 1-3	12th

== Tennis ==
Team Guernsey consists of 3 players. Patrick Ogier, Dominic McLuskey, Heather Watson.

Men

Athlete	Event	Round of 32	Round of 16	Quarterfinals	Semifinals	Final / BM	
Athlete	Event	Opposition Score	Opposition Score	Opposition Score	Opposition Score	Opposition Score	Rank
Patrick Ogier	Singles	Ebden (AUS); L 3-6, 2–6	did not advance				

Women

Athlete	Event	Round of 32	Round of 16	Quarterfinals	Semifinals	Final / BM	
Athlete	Event	Opposition Score	Opposition Score	Opposition Score	Opposition Score	Opposition Score	Rank
Heather Watson	Singles	Lambert (BER); W 6-0, 6-0	Venkatesha (IND); W 7-6 (8-6), 6-3	Rodionova (AUS); L 0-6, 2-6	did not advance		

Mixed

Athlete	Event	Round of 16	Quarterfinals	Semifinals	Final / BM	
Athlete	Event	Opposition Score	Opposition Score	Opposition Score	Opposition Score	Rank
Heather Watson; Patrick Ogier	Doubles	Russell / Rolle (BAH); W 6-7, 6–4, 7-5	Borwell / Skupski (ENG); L 0-6, 1-6	did not advance		

== See also ==
- 2010 Commonwealth Games
