= Tennis at the 2010 Commonwealth Games – Women's doubles =

Women's doubles
- Tennis at the 2010 Commonwealth Games

Events
| Singles | men | women |
| Doubles | men | women | mixed |
- Commonwealth Games

This was the first ever Commonwealth tournament held, Anastasia Rodionova and Sally Peers of Australia were the top seeds. They won the gold medal after defeating fellow Australians Olivia Rogowska and Jessica Moore 6-3, 2-6, 6-3.

== Medalists ==
| Gold | Anastasia Rodionova / Sally Peers; Australia |
| Silver | Olivia Rogowska / Jessica Moore; Australia |
| Bronze | Sania Mirza / Rushmi Chakravarthi; India |

== Seeds ==
1. Anastasia Rodionova / Sally Peers (AUS) (champions, gold medalists)
2. Sarah Borwell / Anna Smith (ENG) (quarterfinals)
3. Olivia Rogowska / Jessica Moore (AUS) (final, silver medalists)
4. Sania Mirza / Rushmi Chakravarthi (IND) (semifinals, bronze medalists)

== Main draw ==
Key

- Q = Qualifier
- WC = Wild card
- LL = Lucky loser
- Alt = Alternate
- ITF = ITF entry
- PR = Protected ranking
- SR = Special ranking
- SE = Special exempt
- JE = Junior exempt
- JR = Junior Accelerator Programme entrant
- CO = College Accelerator Programme entrant
- NG = Next Gen Accelerator Program entrant
- w/o = Walkover
- r = Retired
- d = Defaulted

=== Finals ===
Semifinals
1 | Anastasia Rodionova (AUS); Sally Peers (AUS) | 6 | 6
4 | Sania Mirza (IND); Rushmi Chakravarthi (IND) | 4 | 4
3 | Olivia Rogowska (AUS); Jessica Moore (AUS) | 5 | 6 | 7
Nirupama Sanjeev (IND); Poojashree Venkatesha (IND) | 7 | 3 | 5

Final (gold-medal match)
1 | Anastasia Rodionova (AUS); Sally Peers (AUS) | 6 | 2 | 6
3 | Olivia Rogowska (AUS); Jessica Moore (AUS) | 3 | 6 | 3
Bronze-medal match
4 | Sania Mirza (IND); Rushmi Chakravarthi (IND) | 6 | 6
Nirupama Sanjeev (IND); Poojashree Venkatesha (IND) | 4 | 2

=== Top half ===
First round
T Keeba (KIR); M Keebwa (KIR) | 1 | 0
N Fountain (BAH); L Russell (BAH) | 6 | 6
M Brown (SCO); J Rae (SCO) | 6 | 6
J Lambert (BER); T Lambert (BER) | 2 | 1

Quarterfinals
1 | A Rodionova (AUS); S Peers (AUS) | 6 | 6
N Fountain (BAH); L Russell (BAH) | 2 | 4
4 | S Mirza (IND); R Chakravarthi (IND) | 6 | 7
M Brown (SCO); J Rae (SCO) | 1 | 6^{2}

Semifinals
1 | A Rodionova (AUS); S Peers (AUS) | 6 | 6
4 | S Mirza (IND); R Chakravarthi (IND) | 4 | 4

=== Bottom half ===
| First round | | | Quarterfinals | | | | Semifinals |
| | | | | P Montlha (LES); N Nqosa (LES) | 0 | 1 |
| | | | 3 | O Rogowska (AUS); J Moore (AUS) | 6 | 6 |
| | | | | | | | 3 | O Rogowska (AUS); J Moore (AUS) | 5 | 6 | 7 |
| N Sanjeev (IND); P Venkatesha (IND) | 6 | 6 | | | | | | N Sanjeev (IND); P Venkatesha (IND) | 7 | 3 | 5 |
| M Solih (MDV); I Mahir (MDV) | 0 | 1 | | N Sanjeev (IND); P Venkatesha (IND) | 7 | 6 |
| | | | 2 | S Borwell (ENG); A Smith (ENG) | 5 | 4 |
