= Tennis at the 2010 Commonwealth Games – Women's singles =

Women's singles
- Tennis at the 2010 Commonwealth Games

Events
Singles	men	women
Doubles	men	women	mixed
- Commonwealth Games

This was the first ever Commonwealth tournament held, and Anastasia Rodionova of Australia, the top seed, won the gold medal by defeating India's Sania Mirza in the final. Australia's Sally Peers won the bronze medal.

== Medalists ==
Gold	Anastasia Rodionova; Australia
Silver	Sania Mirza; India
Bronze	Sally Peers; Australia

== Seeds ==
The top 4 seeds receive a bye into R2

1. Anastasia Rodionova (AUS) (champion, gold medalist)
2. Sania Mirza (IND) (final, silver medalist)
3. Katie O'Brien (ENG) (second round)
4. Sally Peers (AUS) (semifinals, bronze medalist)
5. Heather Watson (GUE) (quarterfinals)
6. Olivia Rogowska (AUS) (semifinals, fourth place)
7. Anna Smith (ENG) (quarterfinals)
8. Marina Erakovic (NZL) (quarterfinals)

== Main draw ==
Key

- Q = Qualifier
- WC = Wild card
- LL = Lucky loser
- Alt = Alternate
- ITF = ITF entry
- PR = Protected ranking
- SR = Special ranking
- SE = Special exempt
- JE = Junior exempt
- JR = Junior Accelerator Programme entrant
- CO = College Accelerator Programme entrant
- NG = Next Gen Accelerator Program entrant
- w/o = Walkover
- r = Retired
- d = Defaulted

=== Finals ===
Semifinals
1	Anastasia Rodionova (AUS)	6	6^{4}	6
4	Sally Peers (AUS)	3	7	1
6	Olivia Rogowska (AUS)	6	4	4
2	Sania Mirza (IND)	1	6	6

Final (gold-medal match)
1	Anastasia Rodionova (AUS)	6	2	7
2	Sania Mirza (IND)	3	6	6^{3}
Bronze-medal match
4	Sally Peers (AUS)	4	7	6
6	Olivia Rogowska (AUS)	6	6^{2}	3

=== Top half ===
First round
M Keebwa (KIR)	0	1
L Russell (BAH)	6	6
N Nqosa (LES)	0	0
P Venkatesha (IND)	6	6
T Lambert (BER)	0	0
5	H Watson (GUE)	6	6
A Mahir (MDV)	6	6
L Williams (SVG)	3	2
S Roheman (LCA)	1	0
S Ghosh (MRI)	6	6
A Muttiah (SRI)	0	0
7	A Smith (ENG)	6	6

Second round
1	A Rodionova (AUS)	6	6
L Russell (BAH)	1	3
P Venkatesha (IND)	6^{6}	3
5	H Watson (GUE)	7	6
4	S Peers (AUS)	6	6
A Mahir (MDV)	0	0
S Ghosh (MRI)	4	1
7	A Smith (ENG)	6	6

Quarterfinals
1	A Rodionova (AUS)	6	6
5	H Watson (GUE)	0	2
4	S Peers (AUS)	6	6
7	A Smith (ENG)	3	3

Semifinals
1	A Rodionova (AUS)	6	6^{4}	6
4	S Peers (AUS)	3	7	1

=== Bottom half ===
First round
6	O Rogowska (AUS)	6	6
M Brown (SCO)	2	1
A Carreras (GIB)	6	6
T Keeba (KIR)	0	0
R Chakravarthi (IND)	6	6
P Montlha (LES)	0	1
8	M Erakovic (NZL)	6	6
N Fountain (BAH)	1	0
J Lambert (BER)	6	6
J Nanfuka (UGA)	0	1
A Solih (MDV)	0	0
B Teei (COK)	6	6

Second round
6	O Rogowska (AUS)	6	6
A Carreras (GIB)	2	4
R Chakravarthi (IND)	1	7^{7}	7
3	K O'Brien (ENG)	6	6^{5}	5
8	M Erakovic (NZL)	6	6
J Lambert (BER)	0	0
B Teei (COK)	0	2
2	S Mirza (IND)	6	6

Quarterfinals
6	O Rogowska (AUS)	7	6
R Chakravarthi (IND)	5	4
8	M Erakovic (NZL)	2	3
2	S Mirza (IND)	6	6

Semifinals
6	O Rogowska (AUS)	6	4	4
2	S Mirza (IND)	1	6	6
