= Tennis at the 2010 Commonwealth Games – Men's doubles =

Men's doubles
- Tennis at the 2010 Commonwealth Games

Events
Singles	men	women
Doubles	men	women	mixed
- Commonwealth Games

This was the first ever Commonwealth tournament held, Mahesh Bhupathi and Leander Paes of India were the top seeds, but they lost in the semifinals to the eventual champions Paul Hanley and Peter Luczak from Australia, and had to settle for the bronze medal. Hanley and Luczak defeated Ross Hutchins and Ken Skupski of England, 6–4, 3–6, 6–3, in the final to win the gold medal.

== Medalists ==
Gold	Paul Hanley / Peter Luczak; Australia
Silver	Ross Hutchins / Ken Skupski; England
Bronze	Mahesh Bhupathi / Leander Paes; India

== Seeds ==
1. Mahesh Bhupathi / Leander Paes (IND) (semifinals, bronze medalists)
2. Rohan Bopanna / Somdev Devvarman (IND) (semifinals, fourth place)
3. Ross Hutchins / Ken Skupski (ENG) (final, silver medalists)
4. Paul Hanley / Peter Luczak (AUS) (champions, gold medalists)

== Main draw ==
Key

- Q = Qualifier
- WC = Wild card
- LL = Lucky loser
- Alt = Alternate
- ITF = ITF entry
- PR = Protected ranking
- SR = Special ranking
- SE = Special exempt
- JE = Junior exempt
- JR = Junior Accelerator Programme entrant
- CO = College Accelerator Programme entrant
- NG = Next Gen Accelerator Program entrant
- w/o = Walkover
- r = Retired
- d = Defaulted

== Draw ==
=== Finals ===
Semifinals
1	Mahesh Bhupathi (IND); Leander Paes (IND)	2	2
4	Paul Hanley (AUS); Peter Luczak (AUS)	6	6
3	Ross Hutchins (ENG); Ken Skupski (ENG)	3	6	6
2	Rohan Bopanna (IND); Somdev Devvarman (IND)	6	3	4

Gold Medal Match
4	Paul Hanley (AUS); Peter Luczak (AUS)	6	3	6
3	Ross Hutchins (ENG); Ken Skupski (ENG)	4	6	3
Bronze Medal Match
1	Mahesh Bhupathi (IND); Leander Paes (IND)	6	7^{7}
2	Rohan Bopanna (IND); Somdev Devvarman (IND)	3	6^{4}

=== Top half ===
First round
1	M Bhupathi (IND); L Paes (IND)	6	6
T Dineshkanthan (SRI); R Jayawickreme (SRI)	3	3
J Ward (ENG); J Goodall (ENG)	6	6
F Mwangi (KEN); Denis Okoth (KEN)	2	2
4	P Hanley (AUS); P Luczak (AUS)	7^{7}	6
A Khan (PAK); A-u-H Qureshi (PAK)	6^{5}	4
D Mullings (BAH); M Rolle (BAH)	4	2
Christopher Lewis (WAL); J Milton (WAL)	6	6

Quarterfinals
1	M Bhupathi (IND); L Paes (IND)	6	6^{4}	7^{7}
J Ward (ENG); J Goodall (ENG)	2	7^{7}	6^{4}
4	P Hanley (AUS); P Luczak (AUS)	6	6
Christopher Lewis (WAL); J Milton (WAL)	4	0

Semifinals
1	M Bhupathi (IND); L Paes (IND)	2	2
4	P Hanley (AUS); P Luczak (AUS)	6	6

=== Bottom half ===
First round
Gavin Manders (BER); David Thomas (BER)	2	3
H Lewis (BAR); D King (BAR)	6	6
H Godamanna (SRI); R Rajapakse (SRI)	2	1
3	R Hutchins (ENG); K Skupski (ENG)	6	6
M Ebden (AUS); G Jones (AUS)	6	6
Robert Buyinza (UGA); D Mugabe (UGA)	1	1
C Fleming (SCO); J Murray (SCO)	3	1
2	R Bopanna (IND); S Devvarman (IND)	6	6

Quarterfinals
H Lewis (BAR); D King (BAR)	3	5
3	R Hutchins (ENG); K Skupski (ENG)	6	7
M Ebden (AUS); G Jones (AUS)	6^{5}	4
2	R Bopanna (IND); S Devvarman (IND)	7^{7}	6

Semifinals
3	R Hutchins (ENG); K Skupski (ENG)	3	6	6
2	R Bopanna (IND); S Devvarman (IND)	6	3	4
