= Bermuda at the 2010 Commonwealth Games =

- CG code: BER
- CGA: Bermuda Olympic Association
- Website: olympics.bm

in Delhi, India
- Competitors: 14
- Flag bearers: Opening: Closing:
- Medals: Gold 0 Silver 0 Bronze 0 Total 0

Commonwealth Games appearances (overview)
- 1930; 1934; 1938; 1950; 1954; 1958–1962; 1966; 1970; 1974; 1978; 1982; 1986; 1990; 1994; 1998; 2002; 2006; 2010; 2014; 2018; 2022; 2026; 2030

Bermuda competed in the 2010 Commonwealth Games held in Delhi, India.

== Aquatics ==
=== Swimming ===
Team Bermuda consists of 3 swimmers.

Keira Aitken, Roy-Allan Burch, Nick Thomson

== Athletics ==
Team Bermuda consists of 2 athletes.

Tyrone Smith, Tre Houston

== Shooting ==
Team Bermuda consists of 4 shooters.

Ross Roberts, Sinclair Raynor, Carl Reid, Nelson Simons

== Squash ==
Team Bermuda consists of 1 squash player.

Nick Kyme

== Tennis ==
Team Bermuda consists of 4 tennis players.

Gavin Manders, Tara Lambert, David Thomas, Jacklyn Lambert

Men

Athlete	Event	Round of 32	Round of 16	Quarterfinals	Semifinals	Final / BM	
Athlete	Event	Opposition Score	Opposition Score	Opposition Score	Opposition Score	Opposition Score	Rank
David Thomas	Singles	Jayawickreme (SRI); L 1-6, 2-6	did not advance				
Gavin Manders	Singles	Jones (AUS); L 1-6, 2-6	did not advance				
David Thomas; Gavin Manders	Doubles	—N/a	Lewis / King (BAR) L 2-6, 3-6	did not advance			

Women

Athlete	Event	Round of 32	Round of 16	Quarterfinals	Semifinals	Final / BM	
Athlete	Event	Opposition Score	Opposition Score	Opposition Score	Opposition Score	Opposition Score	Rank
Jacklyn Lambert	Singles	Nanfuka (UGA); W 6-0, 6-1	Erakovic (NZL); L 0-6, 0-6	did not advance			
Tara Lambert	Singles	Watson (GUE); L 0-6, 0-6	did not advance				
Jacklyn Lambert; Tara Lambert	Doubles	—N/a	Brown / Rae (SCO) L 2-6, 1-6	did not advance			

Mixed

Athlete	Event	Round of 16	Quarterfinals	Semifinals	Final / BM	
Athlete	Event	Opposition Score	Opposition Score	Opposition Score	Opposition Score	Rank
Tara Lambert; David Thomas	Doubles	Smith / Hutchins (ENG) L 1-6, 2-6	did not advance			

== See also ==
- 2010 Commonwealth Games
