= Sri Lanka at the 2010 Commonwealth Games =

- CG code: SRI
- CGA: National Olympic Committee of Sri Lanka
- Website: srilankaolympic.org

in Delhi, India
- Competitors: 94 in 14 sports
- Flag bearers: Opening:Chinthana Vidanage; Closing:
- Officials: 45
- Medals Ranked 20th: Gold 0 Silver 1 Bronze 1 Total 2

Commonwealth Games appearances (overview)
- 1938; 1950; 1954; 1958; 1962; 1966; 1970; 1974; 1978; 1982; 1986; 1990; 1994; 1998; 2002; 2006; 2010; 2014; 2018; 2022; 2026; 2030

Sri Lanka competed in the 2010 Commonwealth Games held in Delhi, India, from 3 to 14 October 2010. Sri Lanka was represented by 94 athletes (73 male, 21 female) in 14 sports, with Diving, Lawn Bowls, Field Hockey, Rhythmic gymnastics and Netball not being represented. The 94 athletes represented an increase of 28 from Melbourne in 2006. Also the contingent consisted of 45 officials. Chinthana Vidanage was the flag bearer.

== Medals ==
	(gold)	(silver)	(bronze)	Total
Sri Lanka	0	1	1	2

== Medalists ==
Medal	Name	Sport	Event	Date
Silver	Chinthana Vidanage	Weightlifting	Men's 69kg	October 6
Bronze	Sudesh Peiris	Weightlifting	Men's 62kg	October 5

== Archery ==
Sri Lanka will send 4 archers to the 2010 commonwealth games.

Men

Athlete	Event	Ranking Round		Round of 32	Round of 16	Quarterfinals	Semifinals	Final	Rank
Athlete	Event	Score	Seed	Opposition Score	Opposition Score	Opposition Score	Opposition Score	Opposition Score	Rank
Nipun Seneviratne	Recurve individual								
Hewa Perera	Recurve individual								
Lakmal Rajasinghe	Recurve individual								
Nipun Seneviratne; Hewa Perera; Lakmal Rajasinghe	Team Recurve								

Women

Athlete	Event	Ranking Round		Round of 32	Round of 16	Quarterfinals	Semifinals	Final	Rank
Athlete	Event	Score	Seed	Opposition Score	Opposition Score	Opposition Score	Opposition Score	Opposition Score	Rank
Dilhara Salgado	Recurve individual								

== Athletics ==
Sri Lanka sent a team of 15 athletes to the 2010 Commonwealth games.

Men

Athlete(s)	Events	Round 1		Round 2		Semifinal		Final	
Athlete(s)	Events	Result	Rank	Result	Rank	Result	Rank	Result	Rank
Shehan Abepitiya	100 m	-	-	-	-	-	-	-	-
Shehan Abepitiya	200 m	-	-	-	-	-	-	-	-
K.P. Jayathilaka	T-46 100 m	-	-	-	-	-	-	-	-
Thanuja Viduranga	T-46 100 m	-	-	-	-	-	-	-	-
Prasanna Amarasekera	400 m	-	-	-	-	-	-	-	-
Chaminda Wijekoon	1500 m	-	-	-	-	-	-	-	-
Prasanna Amarasekera; Uditha Wickramasinghe; Shalitha Ramanayake; Kasun Seneviratne; Nalin Karunarathna; Rohitha Pushpakumara	4x400 metre relay	-	-	-	-	-	-	-	-
Manjula Kumara	High Jump	-	-					-	-
Nalin Ratnasiri	High Jump	-	-					-	-

Women

Athlete(s)	Events	Round 1		Round 2		Semifinal		Final	
Athlete(s)	Events	Result	Rank	Result	Rank	Result	Rank	Result	Rank
Chandrika Subashani	400 m	-	-	-	-	-	-	-	-
Nadeeka Lakmali	Javelin	-	-					-	-
C.D. Priyadarshani	Long jump	-	-					-	-

== Badminton ==
Sri Lanka will send 6 shuttlers. The mixed doubles and women's doubles teams are currently unannounced.

Men

Athlete	Event	Round of 32	Round of 16	Quarterfinals	Semifinals	Final
Athlete	Event	Opposition Score	Opposition Score	Opposition Score	Opposition Score	Opposition Score
Dinuka Karunaratne	Singles					
Niluka Karunaratne	Singles					
Lasitha Karunathilaka	Singles					
Dinuka Karunaratne; Niluka Karunaratne	Doubles					

Women

Athlete	Event	Round of 32	Round of 16	Quarterfinals	Semifinals	Final
Athlete	Event	Opposition Score	Opposition Score	Opposition Score	Opposition Score	Opposition Score
Thilini Jayasinghe	Singles					
Chandrika de Silva	Singles					
Subodha Dahanayake	Singles					

Mixed Team

Sri Lanka was ranked 12th in the draw and drew #3 Singapore, #5 New Zealand, #13 Jamaica and tied for #20 (last place) Northern Ireland.

Group B

Team	Pts	Pld	W	L
Singapore	0	0	0	0
New Zealand	0	0	0	0
Sri Lanka	0	0	0	0
Jamaica	0	0	0	0
Northern Ireland	0	0	0	0

== Boxing ==
Sri Lanka will send 7 boxers.

Men

Athlete	Event	Round of 32	Round of 16	Quarterfinals	Semifinals	Final
Athlete	Event	Opposition Result	Opposition Result	Opposition Result	Opposition Result	Opposition Result
Chaminda Thennakoon	Light Flyweight					
D.M. Samarasekara	Flyweight					
Manju Wanniarachchi	Lightweight					
Kamal Sameera	Light Welterweight					
Asanka Rajapaksha	Welterweight					
Suranga Mudannayaka	Middleweight					
Ranil Jayathilaka	Light heavyweight					

== Cycling ==
Sri Lanka will send 5 cyclists.

Men

=== Road ===
Men

Athlete	Event	Time	Rank
Lakshman Wijeratne	Road race		
Lakshman Wijeratne	Time trial		
Janaka Kumara	Road race		
Janaka Kumara	Time trial		
Dane Nugera	Road race		
Dane Nugera	Time trial		
Ishan Sandakelum	Road race		
Ishan Sandakelum	Time trial		

Women

Athlete	Event	Time	Rank
Lasanthi Gunathilaka	Road race		
Lasanthi Gunathilaka	Time trial		

== Gymnastics ==
Sri Lanka will send a gymnastics team of 5 for the 2010 Commonwealth games.

=== Artistic ===
Men

- Tharindu Paththapperuma
- Prasad Sameera Ekanayake

Women

- Ganesha Abeysundara
- Amindha Rathnayake

== Rugby sevens ==
Sri Lanka has qualified a rugby sevens team for the 2010 Commonwealth games. The team will consist of 12 athletes.

- Mahesh Liyanage
- Gayan Weerarathne
- Saliya Kumara
- Kuruppu Saranga
- Harsha Weerarathna
- Radhika Hettiarachchi
- Darshana Ethipola
- Mithra Jayasinghe
- Danuska Hadapangodage
- Chanaka Chandimal
- Charitha Senevirathna
- Dilan Soysa

11 October 2010
10:50

Australia	v	Sri Lanka

Delhi University, New Delhi

11 October 2010
14:04

England	v	Sri Lanka

Delhi University, New Delhi

11 October 2010
16:26

Uganda	v	Sri Lanka

Delhi University, New Delhi

== Squash ==
Sri Lanka competed in squash at the 2010 Commonwealth games.

Men

Athlete	Event	Round of 64	Round of 32	Round of 16	Quarterfinals	Semifinals	Final
Athlete	Event	Opposition Score	Opposition Score	Opposition Score	Opposition Score	Opposition Score	Opposition Score
Navin Samarasinghe	Singles	B Hindle (MLT)					

Women

Athlete	Event	Round of 64	Round of 32	Round of 16	Quarterfinals	Semifinals	Final
Athlete	Event	Opposition Score	Opposition Score	Opposition Score	Opposition Score	Opposition Score	Opposition Score
Sharya Guruge	Singles	S Madhani (KEN)					

Mixed

Pool 6

Rank	Team	Pts	Pld	W	L	PF	PA
1	Waters – Grant (ENG)	0	0	0	0	0	0
2	Chinappa – Sandhu (IND)	0	0	0	0	0	0
3	Guruge – Samarasinghe (SRI)	0	0	0	0	0	0
4	Curgenven – Birch (GUE)	0	0	0	0	0	0

== Shooting ==
Sri Lanka will send 3 shooters to the 2010 Commonwealth Games.

Men

- Edirisinghe Senanayake
- Sarath Chandrasiri
- Mangala Samarakoon

== Swimming ==
Men

Athlete	Event	Heats		Semifinals		Final	
Athlete	Event	Time	Rank	Time	Rank	Time	Rank
Sunil Amarasinghe	50 m freestyle S9						
Niluka Thilakaratne	50 m freestyle S10						
Heshan Unamboowe	50 m freestyle						
Heshan Unamboowe	50 m backstroke						
Heshan Unamboowe	100 m backstroke						
Matthew Abeysinghe	100 m freestyle						
Matthew Abeysinghe	200 m freestyle						
Matthew Abeysinghe	400 m freestyle						
Conrad Francis	50 m breaststroke						
Conrad Francis	200 m butterfly						
Conrad Francis	100 m butterfly						

Women

Athlete	Event	Heats		Semifinals		Final	
Athlete	Event	Time	Rank	Time	Rank	Time	Rank
Madhawee Weerathunga	50 m freestyle						
Madhawee Weerathunga	100 m freestyle						
Lihini Dias	50 m freestyle						
Lihini Dias	50 m breaststroke						
Sachini Amarasinghe	50 m backstroke						
Sachini Amarasinghe	50 m breaststroke						

== Synchronized swimming ==
Sri Lanka competed in synchronized swimming for the first time at the Commonwealth games.

Athlete	Event	Technical Routine		Free Routine (Preliminary)				Free Routine (Final)			
Athlete	Event	Points	Rank	Points	Rank	Total points	Rank	Points	Rank	Total points	Rank
Dehara Katipearachchi	Solo										
Elisha Gomes; Dehara Katipearachchi	Duet										

== Table tennis ==
Sri Lanka will send 6 paddlers.

Men

- Rohan Sirisena
- Dinesh Deshappriya
- Nirmala Bandara Jayasinghe

Women

- Nuwani Nawodya
- Ishara Mudurangi
- Kavindi Rukmali Sahabandu

== Tennis ==
Men

Athlete	Event	Round of 32	Round of 16	Quarterfinals	Semifinals	Final
Athlete	Event	Opposition Score	Opposition Score	Opposition Score	Opposition Score	Opposition Score
Thangarajah Dineshkanthan	Singles					
Harshana Godamanna	Singles					
Amresh Jayawickrema	Singles	David (BER); W 6-1 6-2				
Rajeev Rajapakse	Singles					
Harshana Godamanna; Rajeev Rajapakse	Doubles					

Women

Athlete	Event	Round of 32	Round of 16	Quarterfinals	Semifinals	Final
Athlete	Event	Opposition Score	Opposition Score	Opposition Score	Opposition Score	Opposition Score
Amritha Muttiah	Singles					

Mixed

Athlete	Event	Round of 32	Round of 16	Quarterfinals	Semifinals	Final
Athlete	Event	Opposition Score	Opposition Score	Opposition Score	Opposition Score	Opposition Score
Harshana Godamanna; Amritha Muttiah	Mixed doubles					

== Weightlifting ==
Sri Lanka sent a team of 10 weightlifters.

Men

Athlete	Event	Snatch		Clean & Jerk		Total	Rank
Athlete	Event	Result	Rank	Result	Rank	Total	Rank
Kamal Bandara	-56 kg	-	-	-	-	-	-
Sangeth Wijesooriya	-56 kg	-	-	-	-	-	-
Sudesh Peiris	-62 kg	-	-	-	-	-	Bronze
Romesh Samarasekara	-62 kg	-	-	-	-	-	-
Chinthana Vidanage	-69 kg	-	-	-	-	-	-
Indika Dissanayake	-85 kg	-	-	-	-	-	-
Thusitha Abeykoon	-94 kg	-	-	-	-	-	-
Manjula Wijerathna	-105+ kg	-	-	-	-	-	-

Men – EAD (Powerlifting)

Athlete	Event	Snatch		Clean & Jerk		Total	Rank
Athlete	Event	Result	Rank	Result	Rank	Total	Rank
Kamal Bandara	-48 kg	-	-	-	-	-	-
Sanath Kumara	-52 kg	-	-	-	-	-	-

== Wrestling ==
Sri Lanka will send 3 wrestlers to New Delhi

Men's Freestyle

Athlete	Event	Round of 16	Quarterfinals	Semifinals	Repechage Round 1	Repechage Round 2	Final
Athlete	Event	Opposition Result	Opposition Result	Opposition Result	Opposition Result	Opposition Result	Opposition Result
Yaparathna Kumara	−55 kg						
Saman Kumara	−60 kg						
Roshan Indika	−66 kg						

== See also ==
- 2010 Commonwealth Games
