= L&G (disambiguation) =

L&G may serve as an acronym for:

- Liquefied natural gas, LNG
- Ladies & Gentlemen, the Tokyo bedding company at the centre of the Enten controversy
- Legal & General Group Plc, a multinational financial services company headquartered in the United Kingdom
- Leisure and Gaming, a defunct online gambling holding company
