= Cycling at the 2010 Commonwealth Games – Men's road time trial =

Cycling – Men's road time trial at the 2010 Commonwealth Games
- Venue: Noida Expressway
- Dates: 13 October 2010
- Competitors: 62

The Men's time trial took place at 13 October 2010 at the Noida Expressway. The race started at 13:00 and covered 40 km.

== Final classification ==
62 riders competed:

| Rank | Rider | Time |
|---|---|---|
| 1st place, gold medalist(s) | David Millar (SCO) | 47:18.66 |
| 2nd place, silver medalist(s) | Alex Dowsett (ENG) | 48:13.48 |
| 3rd place, bronze medalist(s) | Luke Durbridge (AUS) | 48:19.22 |
| 4 | Michael Hutchinson (NIR) | 49:32.90 |
| 5 | Chris Froome (ENG) | 49:38.83 |
| 6 | Rohan Dennis (AUS) | 50:21.56 |
| 7 | Zachary Bell (CAN) | 50:35.42 |
| 8 | Jack Bauer (NZL) | 50:48.51 |
| 9 | Jesse Sergent (NZL) | 51:34.01 |
| 10 | Ryan Roth (CAN) | 52:09.53 |
| 11 | Evan Oliphant (SCO) | 52:13.12 |
| 12 | Andrew Roche (IOM) | 52:31.52 |
| 13 | Gordon McCauley (NZL) | 52:32.60 |
| 14 | Andrew Fenn (SCO) | 52:48.23 |
| 15 | Jay Thomson (RSA) | 53:00.28 |
| 16 | Yannick Lincoln (MRI) | 54:17.64 |
| 17 | James McLaughlin (GUE) | 54:55.17 |
| 18 | Erik Hoffmann (NAM) | 55:10.91 |
| 19 | Adrien Niyonshuti (RWA) | 55:27.05 |
| 20 | Robin Ovenden (JER) | 55:36.73 |
| 21 | Graeme Hatcher (IOM) | 56:13.07 |
| 22 | Sombir (IND) | 56:34.94 |
| 23 | Christian Spence (JER) | 57:02.64 |
| 24 | Josh Gosselin (GUE) | 57:16.82 |
| 25 | Bryon Pope (BIZ) | 57:50.95 |
| 26 | Jullian Bellido (GIB) | 58:01.24 |
| 27 | Tobyn Horton (GUE) | 58:03.74 |
| 28 | Amandeep Singh (IND) | 58:29.45 |
| 29 | Atul Kumar (IND) | 58:32.20 |
| 30 | Tom Black (IOM) | 58:39.67 |
| 31 | Richard Tanguy (JER) | 59:04.20 |
| 32 | Christopher Walker (GUE) | 59:05.13 |

| Rank | Rider | Time |
|---|---|---|
| 33 | Marlon Williams (GUY) | 59:22.48 |
| 34 | Pascal Ladaub (MRI) | 59:26.50 |
| 35 | Claude Richardson (ANG) | 59:32.97 |
| 36 | John Kibunja (KEN) | 59:48.32 |
| 37 | Paul Agorir (KEN) | 59:53.50 |
| 38 | Edgar Arana (BIZ) | 1:00:16.86 |
| 39 | Dane Nugera (SRI) | 1:01:03.27 |
| 40 | Marvin Spencer (ANT) | 1:01:07.32 |
| 41 | Lee Calderon (GIB) | 1:01:17.71 |
| 42 | Jyme Bridges (ANT) | 1:01:21.90 |
| 43 | Orano Andrews (SVG) | 1:01:54.62 |
| 44 | Lakshman Wijerathna (SRI) | 1:02:03.04 |
| 45 | Jairo Campis (BIZ) | 1:02:06.83 |
| 46 | Samuel Ekiru (KEN) | 1:02:13.59 |
| 47 | Kurt Maraj (LCA) | 1:02:22.25 |
| 48 | Kris Pradel (ANG) | 1:03:39.73 |
| 49 | Christopher Symonds (GHA) | 1:04:10.89 |
| 50 | Andy Rose (SEY) | 1:04:32.94 |
| 51 | David Matovu (UGA) | 1:05:13.64 |
| 52 | Laurence Jupp (BAH) | 1:06:09.01 |
| 53 | Ken Jackson (ANT) | 1:07:01.60 |
| 54 | Rowshan Jones (BAH) | 1:07:29.82 |
| 55 | Moses Sesay (SLE) | 1:08:45.20 |
| 56 | Missi Kathumba (MAW) | 1:08:49.44 |
| 57 | Brian Richardson (ANG) | 1:08:56.99 |
| 58 | Augustine Sesay (SLE) | 1:09:53.96 |
| 59 | Francis Louis (SEY) | 1:10:51.42 |
| 60 | Sebastian Semakula (UGA) | 1:11:23.71 |
| 61 | Leon Matovu (UGA) | 1:11:39.11 |
| - | David McCann (NIR) | DNF |
| - | Leonard Tsoyo (MAW) | DNS |
| - | Dan Craven (NAM) | DNS |
