= Leisure and Gaming =

Leisure and Gaming plc
- Company type: Public limited company
- Industry: Holding company
- Founded: August 2004; 21 years ago
- Defunct: October 2010
- Fate: Administration due to insolvency
- Headquarters: London, United Kingdom
- Areas served: Europe; United States (until October 2006)
- Key people: Henry Birch (Director, 2004–2006 CEO, 2006 – August 2008); Richard Creed (CEO, August 2008–2010)
- Subsidiaries: Betshop

Leisure and Gaming plc (also "L&G") was formerly a holding company based in London, and listed on the London Stock Exchange with major assents in the global interactive betting and gaming industry. Its interests spanned from software development to marketing.

== History ==
L&G was incorporated in England and Wales in August 2004. Its registered holders are BNY Norwich Union Nominees Ltd, Chase GA Group Nominees Ltd, Chase Nominees Ltd, CUIM Nominee Ltd, and Vidacos Nominees Ltd.

L&G acquired Betshop, a European betting and gaming business, in 2006. In October 2006, immediately preceding passage of the Unlawful Internet Gambling Enforcement Act of 2006, the company sold its US-facing online gambling business to a private group for US$1, and no longer accepted wagers from US residents. The subsidiaries divested in this exit were Bon Bini, ECom ServCorp, English Harbour, Nine.com and VIP. This left Betshop as the company's main operating subsidiary.

By 2008, the company's properties consisted of BetShop Italia, BetShop.com, GoalsLive.com and Acropolis Casino, the focus of which was expansion in Italy and Central and Eastern Europe.

Trading in shares of the company was suspended in May 2010. By October 2010, the company had received a demand from bankers for repayment of debts, and was subsequently placed into Administration due to its insolvency. Two principles of FRP Advisory executed a purchase of Betshop, thereby maintaining the company as a going concern and preserving operations in the UK, Italy, Cyprus and Greece.

== Management ==
Henry Birch assumed the role of chief executive officer (CEO) in 2006, having served as director since 2004. Birch had previously served as the chief operating officer of the Israeli online and TV gaming platform developer Bettingcorp.

Richard Creed was named the company's finance director in May 2008, succeeding Michael Baird; Creed had formerly been finance director for BetonSports.

Also in May 2008, Neil Craven was appointed as the company's non-executive director, succeeding Benjamin Shaw.

In August 2008, Creed succeeded Birch as the company's CEO.
