= Sharya Guruge =

Sri Lankan squash player

Personal information
- Born: 31 May 1992 (age 34) Colombo, Sri Lanka

Sport
- Country: Sri Lanka

Sharya Guruge (born 31 May 1992) is a Sri Lankan female squash player. She became a national squash champion in the women's singles at the 2011 Squash National Championships. Sharya has also competed for Sri Lanka at the 2010 Commonwealth Games
