= Sally Peers =

Australian tennis player (born 1991)

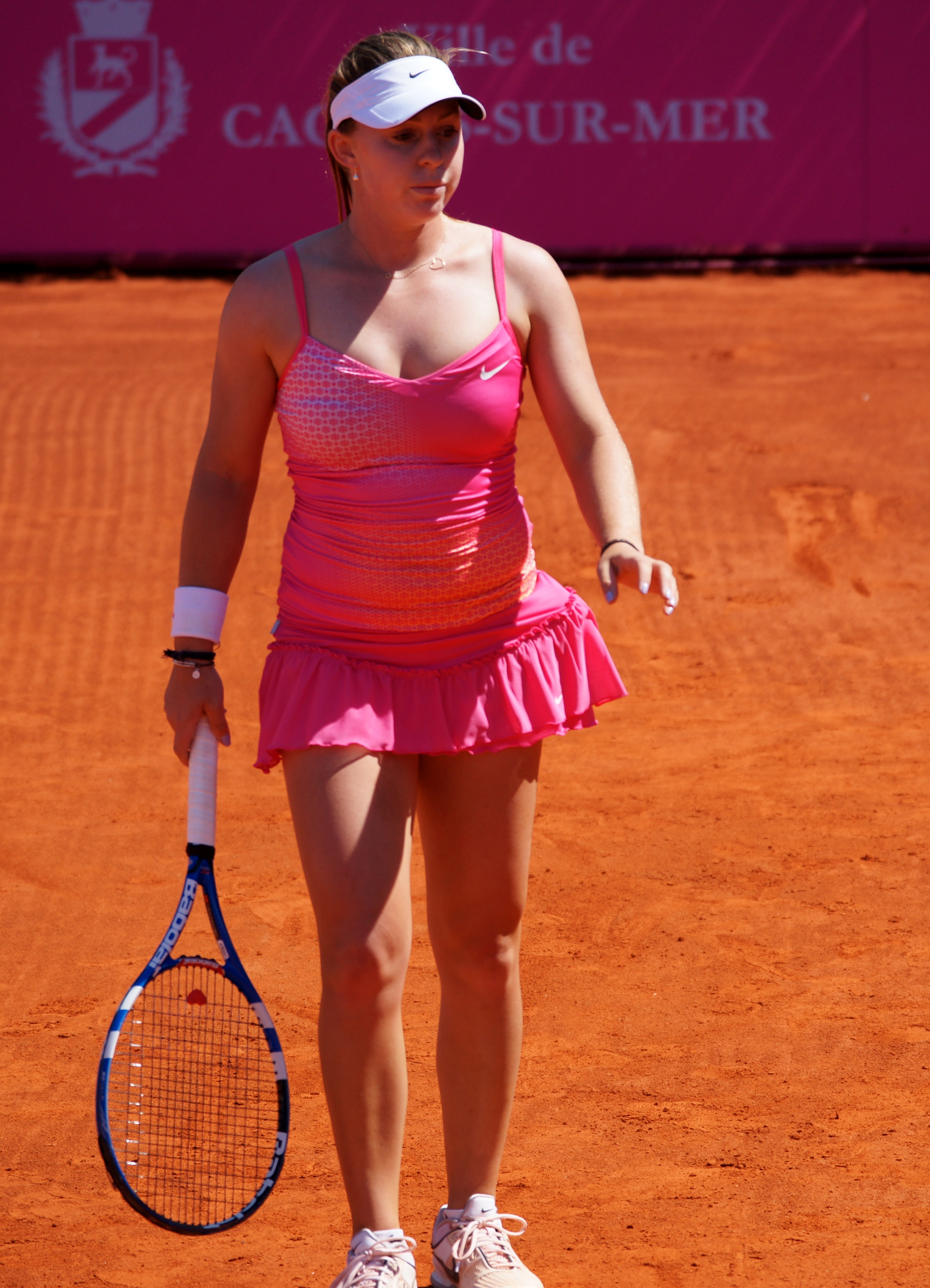
- Sally Peers 2011 at Cagnes-sur-Mer
- Country (sports): Australia
- Residence: Melbourne, Victoria
- Born: 1 June 1991 (age 35) Melbourne
- Height: 1.62 m (5 ft 4 in)
- Turned pro: 2008
- Plays: Right (two-handed backhand)
- Prize money: $259,642

Singles
- Career record: 207–203
- Career titles: 2 ITF
- Highest ranking: No. 145 (11 April 2011)

Grand Slam singles results
- Australian Open: 1R (2011)
- French Open: Q2 (2011)
- Wimbledon: Q1 (2010)
- US Open: 2R (2010)

Doubles
- Career record: 180–146
- Career titles: 14 ITF
- Highest ranking: No. 89 (8 November 2010)

Grand Slam doubles results
- Australian Open: QF (2010)
- Wimbledon: 1R (2010)

Grand Slam mixed doubles results
- Australian Open: QF (2011)

Sally Peers
Medal record

Tennis

Representing Australia

Commonwealth Games
Gold medal – first place	2010 Delhi	Women's doubles
Bronze medal – third place	2010 Delhi	Singles

Sally Peers (born 1 June 1991) is an Australian former professional tennis player. Her career-high singles ranking by the WTA was 145, which she achieved on 11 April 2011, and her best doubles ranking was world No. 89, reached on 8 November 2010. Peers won a gold medal in women's doubles and bronze in women's singles at the 2010 Commonwealth Games. As a junior, she won the girls' doubles title at the 2009 Wimbledon Championships.

== Early life and junior years ==
Her mother, Elizabeth Little, was a professional tennis player, as is her brother, John Peers. Sally Peers started playing tennis at the age of six. She attended Mount View Primary School in Glen Waverley and Korowa Anglican Girls' School.

In 2009, she won the girls' doubles tournament of the Wimbledon Championships, paired with Noppawan Lertcheewakarn of Thailand.

== Professional ==
At the 2010 US Open, Peers qualified to play in the main draw of a Grand Slam tournament for the first time. She defeated world No. 54, Aleksandra Wozniak, before losing to defending champion Kim Clijsters in the second round.

Peers represented Australia at the 2010 Commonwealth Games in New Delhi, India. She was seeded fourth in the singles and, after receiving a bye in the first round, double bagelled Maldive player Aminta Mahir and defeated seventh seed Anna Smith from England in straight sets to reach the semifinals, where she lost to fellow Australian and top seed Anastasia Rodionova in three sets. Peers won the bronze medal play-off match against another Australian, sixth seed Olivia Rogowska. In the women's doubles, Peers and Anastasia Rodionova were top seeds and, after a first round bye, defeated Bahamian team Nikkita Fountain and Larikah Russell and Indian fourth seeds Sania Mirza and Rushmi Chakravarthi to reach the final, where they overcame fellow Australians Jessica Moore and Olivia Rogowska in three sets to win the gold medal.

As a wildcard entrant, Peers achieved her first win over a top 50 ranked player at the 2011 Brisbane International, defeating world No. 25 Alisa Kleybanova in three sets, before losing to Barbora Záhlavová-Strýcová in the second round.

Given a wildcard entry into the singles main draw at the 2011 Australian Open, she lost to 25th seed Petra Kvitová in the first round. Peers also entered the mixed doubles with Carsten Ball as a wildcard pairing and reached the quarterfinals, where they lost to Bethanie Mattek-Sands and Horia Tecău.

== ITF Circuit finals ==
Legend
$50,000 tournaments
$25,000 tournaments
$15,000 tournaments
$10,000 tournaments

=== Singles: 7 (2–5) ===
Result	No.	Date	Location	Surface	Opponent	Score
Loss	1.	14 September 2009	Darwin, Australia	Hard	(Australia) Alicia Molik	3–6, 4–6
Loss	2.	21 February 2010	Mildura, Australia	Grass	(Australia) Casey Dellacqua	5–7, 0–6
Win	3.	26 April 2010	Ipswich, Australia	Clay	(Australia) Sophie Letcher	6–4, 6–3
Loss	4.	3 May 2010	Bundaberg, Australia	Hard	(Japan) Natsumi Hamamura	0–6, 4–6
Win	5.	28 March 2011	Ipswich, Australia	Clay	(Ukraine) Lesia Tsurenko	5–7, 7–5, 6–0
Loss	6.	5 April 2015	Melbourne, Australia	Clay	(Australia) Zoe Hives	5–7, 2–6
Loss	7.	13 June 2015	Bol, Croatia	Clay	(Czech Republic) Gabriela Pantůčková	3–6, 2–6

=== Doubles: 29 (14–15) ===
Result	No.	Date	Location	Surface	Partner	Opponents	Score
Loss	1.	27 April 2009	Bundaberg, Australia	Clay	(Australia) Isabella Holland	(Japan) Maki Arai (Switzerland) Nicole Riner	6–1, 4–6, [9–11]
Win	2.	21 September 2009	Darwin, Australia	Hard	(Australia) Isabella Holland	(Australia) Alenka Hubacek (Indonesia) Jessy Rompies	6–4, 3–6, [10–4]
Loss	3.	16 November 2009	Esperance, Australia	Hard	(Australia) Isabella Holland	(Australia) Shannon Golds (Australia) Olivia Rogowska	1–6, 1–6
Loss	4.	23 November 2009	Kalgoorlie, Australia	Hard	(Australia) Marija Mirkovic	(Australia) Shannon Golds (Australia) Hayley Ericksen	3–6, 6–4, [7–10]
Loss	5.	26 April 2010	Ipswich, Australia	Clay	(Australia) Isabella Holland	(Japan) Moe Kawatoko (Japan) Miki Miyamura	4–6, 6–4, 5–7
Loss	6.	4 February 2011	Burnie International, Australia	Hard	(Australia) Olivia Rogowska	(Japan) Natsumi Hamamura (Japan) Erika Takao	2–6, 6–3, [7–10]
Win	7.	9 May 2011	Reggio Emilia, Italy	Clay	(Australia) Sophie Ferguson	(Italy) Claudia Giovine (Argentina) María Irigoyen	6–4, 6–1
Win	8.	30 May 2011	Rome, Italy	Clay	(Australia) Sophie Ferguson	(Poland) Magda Linette (Romania) Liana Ungur	w/o
Win	9.	24 October 2011	Port Pirie, Australia	Hard	(Australia) Isabella Holland	(Australia) Monique Adamczak (Australia) Bojana Bobusic	w/o
Loss	10.	31 October 2011	Mount Gambier, Australia	Hard	(Australia) Isabella Holland	(Australia) Stephanie Bengson (Australia) Tyra Calderwood	w/o
Loss	11.	1 April 2012	Bundaberg, Australia	Hard	(Australia) Sacha Jones	(Japan) Shuko Aoyama (Japan) Junri Namigata	1–6, 5–7
Win	12.	16 June 2012	Nottingham Open, UK	Grass	(Australia) Ashleigh Barty	(Hungary) Réka Luca Jani (Portugal) Maria João Koehler	7–6^{(2)}, 3–6, [10–5]
Loss	13.	10 September 2012	Salisbury, Australia	Hard	(Australia) Alison Bai	(Indonesia) Ayu Fani Damayanti (Indonesia) Lavinia Tananta	6–7, 0–6
Win	14.	22 September 2012	Port Pirie, Australia	Hard	(Australia) Sacha Jones	(Australia) Stephanie Bengson (South Africa) Chanel Simmonds	6–4, 6–2
Win	15.	5 October 2012	Esperance, Australia	Hard	(Australia) Ashleigh Barty	(France) Victoria Larrière (Australia) Olivia Rogowska	4–6, 7–6^{(5)}, [10–4]
Loss	16.	28 October 2012	Traralgon, Australia	Hard	(Australia) Ashleigh Barty	(Russia) Arina Rodionova (Zimbabwe) Cara Black	6–2, 6–7^{(4)}, [8–10]
Win	17.	2 November 2012	Bendigo International, Australia	Hard	(Australia) Ashleigh Barty	(Russia) Arina Rodionova (Zimbabwe) Cara Black	7–6^{(12)}, 7–6^{(5)}
Loss	18.	6 May 2013	Raleigh, United States	Clay	(Australia) Jessica Moore	(United States) Asia Muhammad (United States) Allie Will	3–6, 3–6
Win	19.	16 September 2013	Cairns, Australia	Hard	(Australia) Isabella Holland	(Japan) Miyu Kato (Japan) Yurina Koshino	7–6^{(7)}, 4–6, [10–7]
Loss	20.	28 October 2013	Bendigo International, Australia	Hard	(Australia) Stephanie Bengson	(Australia) Monique Adamczak (Australia) Olivia Rogowska	3–6, 6–2, [9–11]
Loss	21.	10 March 2014	Orlando, United States	Clay	(United States) Natalie Pluskota	(United States) CiCi Bellis (United States) Alexis Nelson	2–6, 6–0, [9–11]
Win	22.	19 May 2014	Caserta, Italy	Clay	(Australia) Samantha Harris	(Georgia (country)) Ekaterine Gorgodze (Georgia (country)) Sofia Kvatsabaia	6–3, 7–6
Loss	23.	9 June 2014	Bol, Croatia	Clay	(Australia) Samantha Harris	(Czech Republic) Lenka Kunčíková (Czech Republic) Karolína Stuchlá	0–6, 4–6
Loss	24.	21 June 2014	Civitavecchia, Italy	Clay	(United States) Alexa Guarachi	(Italy) Martina Caregaro (Italy) Anna Floris	4–6, 4–6
Loss	25.	17 May 2015	Raleigh, United States	Clay	(United States) Jacqueline Cako	(United States) Jan Abaza (Poland) Justyna Jegiołka	6–7^{(4)}, 6–4, [7–10]
Win	26.	20 June 2015	Alkmaar, Netherlands	Clay	(Poland) Sandra Zaniewska	(Germany) Anna Klasen (Germany) Charlotte Klasen	6–3, 6–4
Win	27.	6 August 2015	Vienna, Austria	Clay	(France) Laëtitia Sarrazin	(Hungary) Ágnes Bukta (Austria) Janina Toljan	6–1, 6–2
Win	28.	29 July 2016	Maaseik, Belgium	Clay	(Australia) Ellen Perez	(Belgium) Déborah Kerfs (United States) Chiara Scholl	6–2, 6–2
Win	29.	24 June 2017	Alkmaar, Netherlands	Clay	(Netherlands) Rosalie van der Hoek	(Belarus) Sviatlana Pirazhenka (Netherlands) Erika Vogelsang	6–3, 6–1
