= Tennis at the Commonwealth Games =

Tennis made its debut at the Commonwealth Games in 2010 in Delhi, India. Tennis has not been on the program since 2014.

== Editions ==
Games	Year	Host city	Host country	Best nation
XIX	2010	Delhi	India	Australia

== Past Finals ==
=== Singles ===
==== Men ====
Tournament	Gold Medal	Silver Medal	Bronze Medal
2010 Delhi	(India) Somdev Devvarman	(Australia) Greg Jones	(Australia) Matthew Ebden

==== Women ====
Tournament	Gold Medal	Silver Medal	Bronze Medal
2010 Delhi	(Australia) Anastasia Rodionova	(India) Sania Mirza	(Australia) Sally Peers

=== Doubles ===
==== Men ====
Tournament	Gold Medal	Silver Medal	Bronze Medal
2010 Delhi	(Australia) Paul Hanley (Australia) Peter Luczak	(England) Ross Hutchins (England) Ken Skupski	(India) Mahesh Bhupathi (India) Leander Paes

==== Women ====
Tournament	Gold Medal	Silver Medal	Bronze Medal
2010 Delhi	(Australia) Anastasia Rodionova (Australia) Sally Peers	(Australia) Olivia Rogowska (Australia) Jessica Moore	(India) Sania Mirza (India) Rushmi Chakravarthi

==== Mixed ====
Tournament	Gold Medal	Silver Medal	Bronze Medal
2010 Delhi	(Scotland) Jocelyn Rae (Scotland) Colin Fleming	(Australia) Anastasia Rodionova (Australia) Paul Hanley	(England) Sarah Borwell (England) Ken Skupski

== All-time medal table ==
Updated after the 2014 Commonwealth Games

Rank	Nation	Gold	Silver	Bronze	Total
1	Australia	3	3	2	8
2	India	1	1	2	4
3	Scotland	1	0	0	1
4	England	0	1	1	2
Totals (4 entries)		5	5	5	15
