= Ross Hutchins =

British tennis player (born 1985)

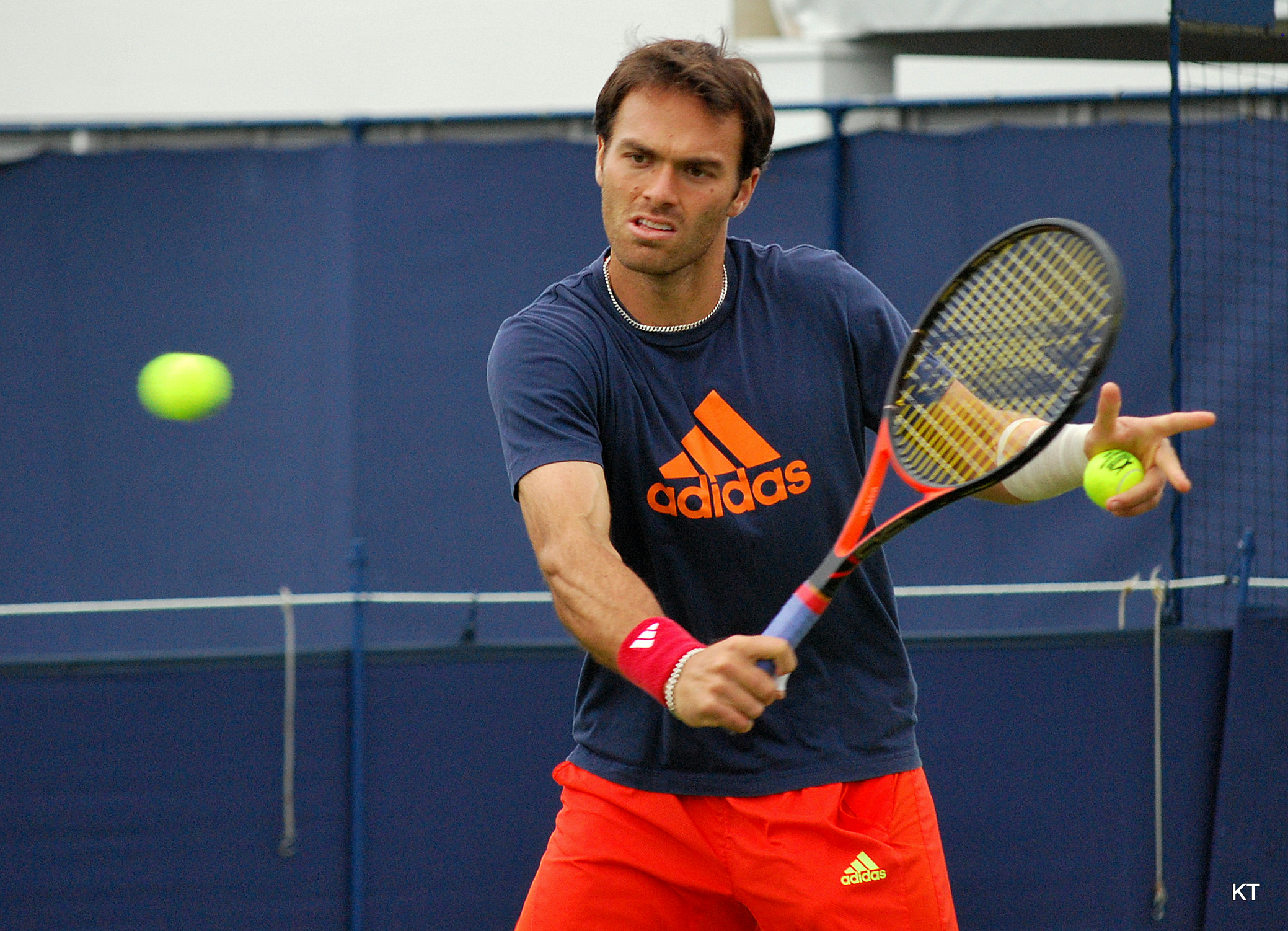
- Country (sports): (United Kingdom) Great Britain; England
- Residence: Wimbledon, London
- Born: 22 February 1985 (age 41) Wimbledon, London
- Height: 1.90 m (6 ft 3 in)
- Turned pro: 2002
- Retired: 13 September 2014
- Plays: Right-handed
- Prize money: $831,609

Singles
- Career record: 0–1
- Career titles: 0
- Highest ranking: No. 559 (7 August 2006)

Doubles
- Career record: 130–141 (47.9%)
- Career titles: 5
- Highest ranking: No. 26 (7 May 2012)

Grand Slam doubles results
- Australian Open: 3R (2012)
- French Open: 3R (2008)
- Wimbledon: QF (2011)
- US Open: QF (2011)

Mixed doubles
- Career record: 3–8 (27%)
- Career titles: 0

Grand Slam mixed doubles results
- Australian Open: 1R (2010)
- French Open: 1R (2009, 2010)
- Wimbledon: 2R (2008, 2011, 2012)
- US Open: SF (2014)

Team competitions
- Davis Cup: Europe/Africa Zone Group I 2R (2012)
Medal record
Representing England
Commonwealth Games
Silver medal – second place	2010 Delhi	Men's Doubles

Ross Dan Hutchins (born 22 February 1985) is a retired British professional tennis player, known best as a doubles player, who achieved a highest doubles ranking of 26. He competed for England at the 2010 Commonwealth Games in Delhi where he won silver partnering Ken Skupski in the Men's Doubles event.

Having turned professional in 2002, he enjoyed success on the Challenger circuit and broke through to the ATP Tour in late 2007. He reached thirteen ATP Tour doubles finals in his career winning five of them, Beijing, Montpellier, St Petersburg, Delray Beach, and Eastbourne. In 2011 he had his best doubles Grand slam season reaching the quarter-finals of Wimbledon and then two months later equalling it at the US Open. Hutchins was one of Britain's highest ranked doubles players, alongside Jamie Murray, Colin Fleming and Ken Skupski.

Hutchins was diagnosed with Hodgkin's lymphoma in late 2012, which was treated and went into remission by July 2013. At the point of his diagnosis he was the British No. 3 and ranked No. 28 in the world in doubles; however, after missing the entire 2013 season, Hutchins dropped out of the ATP singles rankings. Hutchins returned to action for the start of the 2014 season.

In March 2014, he became the tournament director of the Aegon Championships.

In September 2014, Hutchins left his role as tournament director to take up a new position as the ATP's vice-president of player relations.

== Early and personal life ==
Hutchins, whose father was Paul Hutchins, a former British Davis Cup player and Davis Cup Captain, has 3 siblings.

Hutchins was born in Wimbledon and attended the King's College School in Wimbledon. He left the school with seven GCSEs in 2001 to pursue tennis career and to study French and Spanish courses. He played a lot on indoor carpet courts at the All England Club after finishing homework. He also excelled in playing cricket, rugby, basketball, swimming and football at the school. He also enjoys playing golf and has a handicap of 12 and is an avid Fulham Football Club fan. In 2001 he won the doubles title at British National Championships with James Smith before turning professional in 2002.

== Career ==
=== 2003–2006 ===
Hutchins first started playing in futures and qualifying tournaments in the UK in 2003 and internationally in 2004.

In 2004, he lost consciousness and collapsed due to hydration problems after practicing hard in Colombo, Sri Lanka. Hutchins was hospitalised 20 times which was one of the reasons he gave up singles and turned to less tiring doubles in 2007.

In February 2005 he achieved his first professional tournament victory in the Delmont futures doubles tournament in Switzerland with Henry Adjei-Darko, with further futures doubles victories following. He made his Grand Slam debut at the 2005 Wimbledon Men's Doubles, partnering Martin Lee, though the pair lost to Jean-François Bachelot and Arnaud Clément. His first singles final came in a futures tournament in Montreal the subsequent November.

Hutchins success as a doubles player on the futures circuit continued, and he returned more successfully to the 2006 edition of Wimbledon with regular partner Joshua Goodall. The pair reached the second round, having defeated Christophe Rochus and Stanislas Wawrinka in round one.

Soon after, they reached the final of their first Challenger tournament, in Nottingham. Hutchins chose to concentrate on doubles following tournament success with Goodall.

=== 2007 ===
2007 saw Hutchins winning more futures tournaments. His most successful moment again came in Nottingham, this time reaching his first ATP Tour final, again with Goodall. On the way they beat top seeds Jonathan Erlich and Andy Ram. By the end of the year, Hutchins had broken into the world top 100 doubles ranking, having chosen to focus on the discipline.

=== 2008 ===
Hutchins began to play more regularly in ATP tournaments with his new partner Stephen Huss. They achieved a surprise result in the French Open, beating fourth seeds Mahesh Bhupathi and Mark Knowles in round one, eventually reaching the third round.

Hutchins made his Davis Cup debut for Great Britain in the World Group first round match against Argentina. Hutchins and Jamie Murray played in and lost the doubles match, Great Britain eventually losing 4–1. This was Great Britain's first World Group match since 2003, and now faced a relegation play-off with Austria.

He bounced back immediately at the China Open, where he and Huss clinched their first ATP Tour victory. Towards the end of the season, Hutchins also played some tournaments with Murray's former partner Eric Butorac.

In December, Andy Murray invited Ross Hutchins to his luxurious winter training base in Miami.

=== 2009 ===
In 2009, Hutchins switched to singles for the first time, playing in the qualifying tournament in the new ATP tour event in Johannesburg. He beat Denys Molchanov in the final round 7–5 6–1 to be the first British player to qualify for an ATP event since James Ward qualified for the Artois Championships in June 2008. He should get a new singles ranking of around 1200 after qualifying.

He concentrated on doubles, however, and with his ranking now in the top 50 competed regularly with Stephen Huss in Masters tournaments. A good start to the season saw the pair reach three quarter-finals at these top level tournaments, and Hutchins reached a career peak ranking of number 33 in May 2009.

In March, Hutchins was selected for Great Britain's Davis Cup team for their Europe/Africa Zone Group I match against Ukraine in Renfrewshire. Hutchins and Colin Fleming lost a tightly contested match to Sergiy Stakhovsky and Sergei Bubka, Ukraine winning 6–4, 3–6, 6–3, 5–7, 6–4 to give Ukraine an unassailable 3–0 lead.

As they struggled to win matches and when they did they couldn't make it two in a row. This run of form continued from Madrid until the US Open. Where upon losing in the first round Huss and Hutchins split.

In September, Hutchins was called to the Great British Davis Cup squad for the Europe/Africa Zone Group I play-offs in Liverpool. Hutchins' partner Andy Murray was hampered by a wrist injury which forced Hutchins to play out of position, and they lost 7–5, 3–6, 6–3, 6–2 to Marcin Matkowski and Mariusz Fyrstenberg. Great Britain lost 3–2, and was relegated to the third tier of the Davis Cup.

Following the Davis Cup, he teamed up with Jordan Kerr and Horia Tecău alternately in subsequent tournaments. In his first event with the pair of them they won one and lost one. It then clicked with Kerr in their second tournament together as they reached the final of the Japan Open, which they lost to Jürgen Melzer and Julian Knowle.

Two first round losses with Tecau and one with Kerr followed before dropping down and making the semis of a challenger event with Tecau before losing in the first round of another challenger, Hutchins last tournament of 2009.

In December, Hutchins again stayed with Andy Murray at his Miami training base.

=== 2010 ===
2010 saw Jordan Kerr become Hutchins' partner full-time. The season started brightly after a 1st round exit in Brisbane, they made it to the final in Sydney losing to Daniel Nestor and Nenad Zimonjić. They went out in the first round of the Australian Open, before making their second final of the year in Memphis. This time losing to John Isner and Sam Querrey.

A succession of 1st round exits followed with Kerr and Hutchins' also teamed up with his friend and Davis Cup teammate Andy Murray. They lost in the 1st round at Indian Wells, but won their first match in 11 months as a partnership at the Monte-Carlo Masters beating Cermak and Martinak before losing to the Bryan brothers on a champions tie break.

In October, at the Commonwealth Games in Delhi, England's Hutchins and Ken Skupski won the Doubles Silver Medal, by losing to Australians Paul Hanley and Peter Luczak in the final. A few days later, Hutchins and Ken Skupski were opponents in the Mixed Doubles, Ken Skupski and Sarah Borwell beating Hutchins and Anna Smith to win the bronze medal.

Hutchins and Colin Fleming agreed to begin next year as steady partners, and in November they had a winning start at the Kazakhstan Challenger

=== 2011 ===
Hutchins and Colin Fleming struggled with injuries and interruptions for much of the first six months.

In April, while Ross Hutchins, recovered from injury, Fleming continued playing with other doubles partners.

At the beginning of June, Hutchins/Fleming won the Aegon Trophy Challenger in Nottingham.

At Wimbledon, Hutchins and Fleming both had their best performances at a Grand Slam event in doubles, defeating 7th seeds Mariusz Fyrstenberg and Marcin Matkowski in the first round. Hutchins and Fleming won their first-ever five-set match together over Dmitry Tursunov and Grigor Dimitrov in the second round, on the way to the quarter-finals, where the pair lost a very tight five set thriller to Christopher Kas and Alexander Peya 4–6, 4–6, 7–6^{(7–2)}, 6–2, 4–6. They were the first British pair to reach the quarter-finals of the men's doubles tournament at Wimbledon since 1993. It was announced on the morning of the quarter-finals that Fleming had been picked alongside Jamie Murray for the doubles rubber for Britain's Davis Cup tie against Luxembourg in two weekends' time, leaving Hutchins on the sidelines. Fleming said "I think the team was picked before we went on a run to the quarters here."

Just before Great Britain's match against Luxembourg, Fleming had a slight niggle in his foot so he was replaced by Dan Evans as the back-up player. In the event, it was James Ward, Andy Murray and Jamie Murray who played, with Great Britain winning 4–1.

Two months later at the US Open, Hutchins/Fleming equalled their Wimbledon performance, once again reaching the quarterfinals. Despite a victory over 2nd seeds Max Mirnyi and Daniel Nestor in their second match, they ultimately lost in three sets to Rohan Bopanna and Aisam-ul-Haq Qureshi, blowing a match point opportunity in the deciding set.

Then in September, at the Davis Cup, Hutchins/Fleming helped Great Britain win their promotion tie 5–0 against Hungary to advance to Group I.

Hutchins/Fleming later reached the semi-finals of the Open de Moselle in Metz but lost to second seeds Lukáš Dlouhý and Marcelo Melo in three sets. But a few weeks later he did win his first ATP title of the year and his third career title with Colin Fleming at the St. Petersburg Open. They defeated Michail Elgin and Alexander Kudryavtsev in three sets 6–3, 6–7(5–7), [10–8]. This was Hutchins' first ATP title with Fleming.

His final tournament of the year was at the Paris Masters partnering Andy Murray, they lost in the second round in straight sets to Oliver Marach and Alexander Peya. Hutchins' 2011 year-end ranking was No.43 in the world.

=== 2012 ===
In his first grand slam for the 2012 season Hutchins and partner Colin Fleming reached the third round of the Australian Open for the first time, only to lose to top seeds The Bryan brothers 4–6, 6–0, 2–6.

In February, Hutchins and Fleming were called for the Davis Cup Europe/Africa Zone Group I tie against Slovakia. James Ward's loss and Dan Evans' win put the tie at 1–1 on the first day, then Fleming and Hutchins beat Michal Mertiňák and Filip Polášek 6–3 7–6^{(7–4)} 0–6 6–3. With Dan Evans winning his second match, Great Britain eventually won 3–2, making a fifth consecutive Davis Cup win under captain Leon Smith.

Hutchins won his second title with Fleming and his first for the 2012 season at the 2012 Delray Beach International Tennis Championships defeating Michal Mertiňák and André Sá 2–6, 7–6^{(7–5)}, [15–13], a result which elevated his doubles ranking to a career high of world No.27.

In April, Hutchins and Fleming were selected for the Davis Cup Europe/Africa Zone Group I tie against Belgium. After Josh Goodall and Dan Evans lost on the first day, Fleming and Hutchins made it three straight victories in the competition by beating Ruben Bemelmans and David Goffin 4–6, 7–5, 6–3, 6–4. Great Britain were eventually beaten 4–1, ending Leon Smith's 5 match winning run as Davis Cup Captain.

In mid-June, after being out of action for a while with an ankle injury, Hutchins won his second title of the year and his first on home soil, again partnering Colin Fleming, at the Aegon International, defeating fellow Brits and good friends Jamie Delgado and Ken Skupski 6–4, 6–3. This was Hutchins' third title with Fleming.

However, they had a disappointing run at Wimbledon going out in the first round in five sets, even though they took the first two 6–3, 6–4, 2–6, 6–7^{(5–7)}, 3–6 to Mikhail Kukushkin and Lukáš Rosol. Hutchins did however have a better run in the mixed doubles event, making it into the second round partnering Heather Watson, losing in three sets to third seeds Nenad Zimonjić and Katarina Srebotnik 7–5, 4–6, 4–6.

In their first tournament after Wimbledon, Hutchins and Fleming competed at the Campbell's Hall of Fame Tennis Championships. They reached the final but were defeated by Santiago González and Scott Lipsky in straight sets 6–7^{(3–7)}, 3–6.

Having lost in the semi-finals at the BB&T Atlanta Open Hutchins next competed at the London 2012 Summer Olympics in the doubles event alongside doubles partner Colin Fleming. They then lost in the first round to France (Benneteau & Gasquet) in straight sets 5–7, 3–6.

At the last Major of the season, Hutchins and Fleming made it to the third round of the US Open before being beaten by brothers and home favorites Ryan Harrison and Christian Harrison in straight sets 3–6, 4–6.

After a poor run at the St. Petersburg Open, Hutchins and Fleming next headed off to Asia. They made the final in their first tournament at the Malaysia Open, this being their fourth final of the season. After a bright start they lost the final in three sets 7–5, 5–7, [7–10] to Alexander Peya and Bruno Soares.

At the penultimate masters 1000 of the season, Hutchins and Fleming had their best run at a masters 1000 event making the semi-finals, only to lose narrowly to Indian duo Mahesh Bhupathi and Rohan Bopanna 7–6^{(7–4)}, 3–6, [8–10] despite serving for the match.

=== 2013 ===
Ross Hutchins was diagnosed with Hodgkin's lymphoma in December 2012, and took an indefinite break from tennis while he recovered. His friend Andy Murray dedicated his victory at the 2013 Brisbane International to Hutchins. Hutchins underwent chemotherapy treatment at the Royal Marsden Hospital in Sutton, which ended in June 2013.

In April, Hutchins provided match analysis for the Davis Cup tie versus Russia. James Ward and Dan Evans lost their opening singles matches, but the GB doubles pairing of Colin Fleming and Jonny Marray reduced the deficit a day later, before James Ward levelled the tie at 2–2 after beating Dmitri Tursunov in five sets. Evans completed an unlikely comeback, defeating world no. 80 Evgeny Donskoy comprehensively in straight sets, thus securing what was described as a "famous victory". The last time Great Britain had come from 2–0 down to win a Davis Cup tie was 83 years ago against Germany, Consequently, Great Britain won a place in the 16-team World Group play-offs in September.

Hutchins and Andy Murray arranged a charity tennis event 'Rally Against Cancer', which included the participation of Andy Murray and Tim Henman, Ivan Lendl, Tomáš Berdych, Richard Branson, actor Eddie Redmayne, comedians Michael McIntyre and Jimmy Carr, Jonathan Ross, and Mayor of London Boris Johnson. It took place at the Queen's Club immediately after the 2013 Aegon Championships to raise money for the Royal Marsden. Hutchins revealed in July 2013 that his cancer was now in remission.

In December, Hutchins along with James Ward and Kyle Edmund, stayed with Andy Murray at his training camp in Miami.

=== 2014 ===
Following his illness, Hutchins returned to competitive tennis in January at the Brisbane International, again partnering Colin Fleming. While the pair lost their first two matches of the year, they gained their maiden win after Hutchins' return in the first round of the Australian Open. They then lost in the second round to seventh seeds Rohan Bopanna and Aisam-ul-Haq Qureshi.

On 5 March, Hutchins became the new tournament director at Queen's Club, looking after tennis decisions and player/ATP relations during the tournament week.

Hutchins/Fleming made it to the final of the BMW Open in Munich, where they lost to Jamie Murray and John Peers. They then made a semifinal run at the Aegon International tournament, losing to Treat Huey and Dominic Inglot.

Hutchins/Fleming were knocked out in the first round of the men's doubles at the US Open by the number 3 seeds Daniel Nestor and Nenad Zimonjić. However Hutchins partnered with Chan Yung-jan in the mixed doubles, where they reached the semi-finals before being narrowly defeated by top seeds Bruno Soares and Sania Mirza.

Hutchins announced his retirement from professional tennis on 12 September.

On 30 September, Hutchins left his role as tournament director of the Aegon Championships to take up a new position as the ATP's vice-president of player relations.

In December, Hutchins made his debut at the Statoil Masters Tennis, held at the Royal Albert Hall, teaming up with Jamie Murray in the doubles. Hutchins and Jamie Murray beat Sergi Bruguera and Xavier Malisse 6–4,2–6,10–8. Tim Henman and Andy Roddick beat Hutchins and Jaime Murray 8–6.

== ATP career finals ==
=== Doubles: 14 (5 titles, 9 runners-up) ===
Legend Grand Slam tournaments (0–0) ATP World Tour Finals (0–0) ATP World Tour Masters 1000 (0–0) ATP World Tour 500 Series (0–2) ATP World Tour 250 Series (5–7)	Titles by surface Hard (4–4) Clay (0–1) Grass (1–2) Carpet (0–2)	Titles by setting Outdoor (3–5) Indoor (2–4)

Result	W–L	Date	Tournament	Tier	Surface	Partner	Opponents	Score
Loss	0–1	Jun 2007	Nottingham Open, United Kingdom	Intl Series	Grass	(United Kingdom) Joshua Goodall	(United States) Eric Butorac (United Kingdom) Jamie Murray	6–4, 3–6, [5–10]
Win	1–1	Sep 2008	China Open, China	Intl Series	Hard	(Australia) Stephen Huss	(Australia) Ashley Fisher (United States) Bobby Reynolds	7–5, 6–4
Loss	1–2	Oct 2008	Kremlin Cup, Russia	Intl Series	Carpet (i)	(Australia) Stephen Huss	(Ukraine) Sergiy Stakhovsky (Italy) Potito Starace	6–7^{(4–7)}, 6–2, [6–10]
Loss	1–3	Oct 2008	Grand Prix de Tennis de Lyon, France	Intl Series	Carpet (i)	(Australia) Stephen Huss	(France) Michaël Llodra (Israel) Andy Ram	3–6, 7–5, [8–10]
Loss	1–4	Oct 2009	Japan Open, Japan	500 Series	Hard	(Australia) Jordan Kerr	(Austria) Julian Knowle (Austria) Jürgen Melzer	2–6, 7–5, [8–10]
Loss	1–5	Jan 2010	Sydney International, Australia	250 Series	Hard	(Australia) Jordan Kerr	(Canada) Daniel Nestor (Serbia) Nenad Zimonjić	3–6, 6–7^{(5–7)}
Loss	1–6	Feb 2010	U.S. National Indoor Tennis Championships, United States	500 Series	Hard (i)	(Australia) Jordan Kerr	(United States) John Isner (United States) Sam Querrey	4–6, 4–6
Win	2–6	Oct 2010	Open Sud de France, France	250 Series	Hard (i)	(Australia) Stephen Huss	(Spain) Marc López (Argentina) Eduardo Schwank	2–6, 6–4, [7–10]
Win	3–6	Oct 2011	St. Petersburg Open, Russia	250 Series	Hard (i)	(United Kingdom) Colin Fleming	(Russia) Mikhail Elgin (Russia) Alexander Kudryavtsev	6–3, 6–7^{(5–7)}, [10–8]
Win	4–6	Mar 2012	Delray Beach Open, United States	250 Series	Hard	(United Kingdom) Colin Fleming	(Slovakia) Michal Mertiňák (Brazil) André Sá	2–6, 7–6^{(7–5)}, [15–13]
Win	5–6	Jun 2012	Eastbourne International, United Kingdom	250 Series	Grass	(United Kingdom) Colin Fleming	(United Kingdom) Jamie Delgado (United Kingdom) Ken Skupski	6–4, 6–3
Loss	5–7	Jul 2012	Hall of Fame Tennis Championships, United States	250 Series	Grass	(United Kingdom) Colin Fleming	(Mexico) Santiago González (United States) Scott Lipsky	6–7^{(3–7)}, 3–6
Loss	5–8	Sep 2012	Malaysian Open, Malaysia	250 Series	Hard (i)	(United Kingdom) Colin Fleming	(Austria) Alexander Peya (Brazil) Bruno Soares	7–5, 5–7, [7–10]
Loss	5–9	May 2014	Bavarian International, Germany	250 Series	Clay	(United Kingdom) Colin Fleming	(United Kingdom) Jamie Murray (Australia) John Peers	4–6, 2–6

== Doubles performance timeline ==
Key
W	F	SF	QF	#R	RR	Q#	DNQ	A	NH

(W) winner; (F) finalist; (SF) semifinalist; (QF) quarterfinalist; (#R) rounds 4, 3, 2, 1; (RR) round-robin stage; (Q#) qualification round; (DNQ) did not qualify; (A) absent; (NH) not held; (SR) strike rate (events won / competed); (W–L) win–loss record.

Tournament	2005	2006	2007	2008	2009	2010	2011	2012	2013	2014	W–L
Grand Slam tournaments
Australian Open	A	A	A	A	2R	1R	1R	3R	A	2R	4–5
French Open	A	A	A	3R	1R	1R	A	A	A	1R	2–4
Wimbledon	1R	2R	1R	2R	1R	2R	QF	1R	A	1R	6–9
US Open	A	A	A	2R	1R	1R	QF	3R	A	1R	5–6
Win–loss	0–1	1–1	0–1	4–3	1–4	1–4	5–3	4–3	0–0	1–4	17–24
ATP World Tour Finals
ATP World Tour Finals	Did not qualify										0–0
Olympics
Summer Olympics	Not Held			A	Not Held			1R	Not Held		0–1
ATP World Tour Masters 1000
Indian Wells Masters	A	A	A	A	QF	1R	A	1R	A	2R	3–4
Miami Masters	A	A	A	A	QF	1R	A	2R	A	1R	3–4
Monte-Carlo Masters	A	A	A	A	A	A	A	A	A	A	0–0
Rome Masters	A	A	A	A	1R	A	A	A	A	A	0–1
Madrid Masters	A	A	A	A	QF	A	A	A	A	A	2–1
Canada Masters	A	A	A	A	1R	A	A	1R	A	A	0–2
Cincinnati Masters	A	A	A	A	1R	A	A	1R	A	A	0–2
Shanghai Masters	NM1				A	A	A	SF	A	A	3–1
Paris Masters	A	A	A	A	A	A	2R	2R	A	A	2–2
Hamburg Masters	A	A	A	A	NM1						0–0
Win–loss	A	A	A	A	6–6	0–2	1–1	5–6	0–0	1–2	13–16
Finals	0	0	1	3	1	3	1	4	0	1	14
Titles	0	0	0	1	0	1	1	2	0	0	5
Year-end ranking	272	153	92	44	50	51	43	28	–	145	NA
