= Henry Birch =

British businessman

Henry Benedict Birch
- Born: Henry Birch; February 1969 (age 57)
- Education: University of Edinburgh; Stanford Graduate School of Business
- Occupation: Businessman
- Title: CEO, Halfords
- Term: April 2025-
- Predecessor: Graham Stapleton

Henry Benedict Birch (born February 1969) is a British businessman, and the chief executive officer (CEO) of Halfords since April 2025. He was previously CEO of The Very Group (May 2018 to June 2022), and The Rank Group (May 2014 to May 2018).

Birch was born in February 1969, and educated at the University of Edinburgh where he received a master's degree in political science, followed by an MBA from the Stanford Graduate School of Business.
