= Jocelyn Rae =

British tennis player (born 1991)

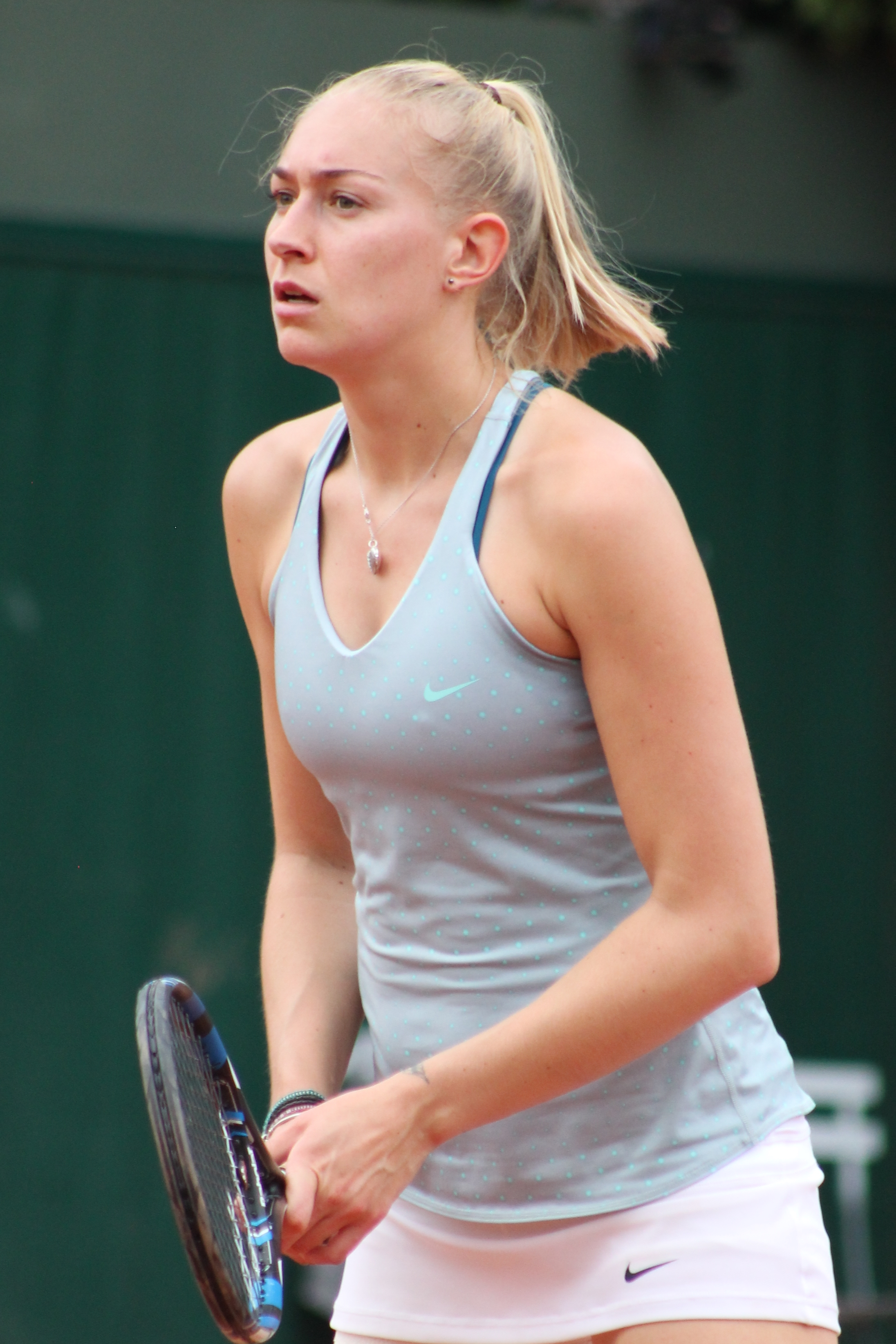
- Rae at the 2016 French Open
- Country (sports): United Kingdom; Scotland
- Residence: Arnold, England
- Born: 20 February 1991 (age 35) Nottingham, England
- Height: 6 ft 2 in (1.88 m)
- Turned pro: 2009
- Retired: 2017
- Plays: Right (two-handed backhand)
- Prize money: $213,702

Singles
- Career record: 70–53
- Career titles: 1 ITF
- Highest ranking: No. 450 (12 July 2010)

Grand Slam singles results
- Wimbledon: Q1 (2010)

Doubles
- Career record: 165–112
- Career titles: 23 ITF
- Highest ranking: No. 67 (22 February 2016)

Grand Slam doubles results
- Australian Open: 3R (2016)
- French Open: 2R (2016)
- Wimbledon: 2R (2009, 2010, 2015, 2017)
- US Open: 1R (2015)

Grand Slam mixed doubles results
- Wimbledon: QF (2017)
Medal record
Representing Scotland
Commonwealth Games
Gold medal – first place	2010 Delhi	Mixed doubles

Jocelyn Rae (born 20 February 1991) is a British former tennis player.

Rae has a career-high doubles ranking of 67 by the WTA, achieved on 22 February 2016. In her career, she won one singles title and 23 doubles titles on the ITF Women's Circuit.

Together with Colin Fleming, she won the gold medal in the mixed doubles at the 2010 Commonwealth Games in Delhi for Scotland (qualifying through her Stirlingshire-born father). She was coached by former professional tennis player and fellow Scot, Karen Paterson. She is openly lesbian.

== Career ==
=== Junior (2006–2009) ===
Rae played her first match on the ITF Junior Circuit in April 2006 and continued to compete as a junior until July 2009. During this time, her greatest successes came in doubles although she did win one title at the 2006 Egypt International Championships. She also reached one semifinal and three quarterfinals in singles. In doubles, Rae won three titles (two with Hannah James and one with Amanda Elliott) as well as reaching one more final and three semifinals, one of which was in the 2008 Wimbledon girls' doubles, partnering Jade Curtis. They lost, 6–4, 3–6, 4–6, to Polona Hercog and Jessica Moore, the sixth seeded team who went on to win the title. Rae ended her junior career with win–loss records of 21–18 in singles and 26–14 in doubles. Her career-high combined junior ranking was world No. 167, which she achieved on 23 April 2007.

=== 2010–2017 ===
Representing Scotland, Rae and Colin Fleming won the mixed doubles gold medal at the 2010 Commonwealth Games in India, defeating top seeds Anastasia Rodionova and Paul Hanley from Australia in the final.

In February 2014, Rae received her first call up to the British Fed Cup Team, following Laura Robson's withdrawal due to injury.

In July, Rae reached her first WTA Tour doubles final at the Swedish Open, partnering Anna Smith.

In April 2015, Rae won a $50k tournament in Croissy-Beaubourg, France, partnering Anna Smith. In June 2015, she lost the WTA doubles final of the Nottingham Open.

Rae announced her retirement from professional tennis in December 2017.

== Post-retirement life ==
After returning, Rae worked as an academy coach at the National Tennis Academy.

== WTA Tour finals ==
=== Doubles: 4 (4 runner-ups) ===
Winner - Legend Tier I / Premier M & Premier 5 Tier II / Premier Tier III, IV & V / International (0–4)	Finals by surface Hard (0–1) Grass (0–2) Clay (0–1)

Result	Date	Tournament	Surface	Partner	Opponents	Score
Loss	Jul 2014	Båstad Open, Sweden	Clay	(United Kingdom) Anna Smith	(Slovenia) Andreja Klepač (Spain) María Teresa Torró Flor	1–6, 1–6
Loss	Jun 2015	Nottingham Open, UK	Grass	(United Kingdom) Anna Smith	(United States) Raquel Kops-Jones (United States) Abigail Spears	6–3, 3–6, [9–11]
Loss	Sep 2016	Japan Women's Open	Hard	(United Kingdom) Anna Smith	(Japan) Shuko Aoyama (Japan) Makoto Ninomiya	3–6, 3–6
Loss	Jun 2017	Nottingham Open, UK	Grass	(United Kingdom) Laura Robson	(Australia) Monique Adamczak (Australia) Storm Sanders	4–6, 6–4, [4–10]

== ITF Circuit finals ==
=== Singles (1–1) ===
Legend $10,000 tournaments	Finals by surface Hard (1–1)

Outcome	No.	Date	Location	Surface	Opponent	Score
Loss	1.	31 August 2009	Cumberland, United Kingdom	Hard	(United Kingdom) Jade Windley	1–6, 1–6
Win	1.	12 October 2009	Mytilini, Greece	Hard	(United Kingdom) Jade Windley	6–2, 6–1

=== Doubles (23–7) ===
Legend $100,000 tournaments $75,000 tournaments $50,000 tournaments $25,000 tournaments $15,000 tournaments $10,000 tournaments	Finals by surface Hard (19–4) Clay (1–2) Grass (3–1)

Outcome	No.	Date	Location	Surface	Partner	Opponents	Score
Win	1.	15 September 2008	Kawana Waters, Australia	Hard	(Australia) Emelyn Starr	(United States) Alexis Prousis (United States) Robin Stephenson	6–4, 4–6, [10–4]
Win	2.	6 July 2009	Felixstowe, UK	Grass	(United Kingdom) Jade Windley	(Slovenia) Dalila Jakupović (Germany) Sarah-Rebecca Sekulic	6–1, 6–0
Win	3.	13 July 2009	Frinton, UK	Grass	(United Kingdom) Jade Windley	(United Kingdom) Anna Fitzpatrick (Australia) Emelyn Starr	6–3, 7–5
Win	4.	4 September 2009	Cumberland, UK	Hard	(United Kingdom) Jade Windley	(Switzerland) Lucia Kovarčíková (Czech Republic) Monika Tumova	6–4, 6–0
Loss	1.	12 October 2009	Mytilini, Greece	Hard	(United Kingdom) Jade Windley	(Poland) Olga Brózda (Poland) Justyna Jegiołka	4–6, 4–6
Loss	2.	30 November 2009	Bendigo International, Australia	Hard	(Australia) Emelyn Starr	(France) Irena Pavlovic (Russia) Arina Rodionova	3–6, 6–7^{(3)}
Win	5.	9 May 2010	Edinburgh, UK	Clay	(United Kingdom) Amanda Elliott	(Hungary) Tímea Babos (United Kingdom) Tara Moore	7–6^{(5)}, 6–4
Loss	3.	17 July 2010	Woking, UK	Hard	(Australia) Emelyn Starr	(Hungary) Tímea Babos (Finland) Emma Laine	2–6, 2–6
Win	6.	31 July 2010	Chiswick, UK	Hard	(Australia) Emelyn Starr	(United Kingdom) Anna Fitzpatrick (United Kingdom) Jade Windley	6–1, 6–4
Win	7.	13 November 2010	GB Pro-Series Loughborough, UK	Hard (i)	(United Kingdom) Jade Windley	(Czech Republic) Jana Orlova (Czech Republic) Petra Krejsová	6–3, 5–7, [10–4]
Win	8.	9 November 2013	Loughborough, UK	Hard (i)	(United Kingdom) Anna Smith	(Italy) Francesca Palmigiano (Italy) Camilla Rosatello	6–0, 4–6, [10–3]
Win	9.	15 November 2013	Manchester, UK	Hard (i)	(United Kingdom) Anna Smith	(Netherlands) Eva Wacanno (Germany) Julia Wachaczyk	6–1, 6–4
Loss	4.	7 December 2013	Pune, India	Hard	(United Kingdom) Anna Smith	(Thailand) Nicha Lertpitaksinchai (Thailand) Peangtarn Plipuech	5–7, 5–7
Win	10.	13 December 2013	Navi Mumbai, India	Hard	(United Kingdom) Anna Smith	(Georgia (country)) Oksana Kalashnikova (Latvia) Diāna Marcinkēviča	6–4, 7–6^{(5)}
Win	11.	18 January 2014	GB Pro-Series Glasgow, UK	Hard (i)	(United Kingdom) Anna Smith	(Czech Republic) Martina Borecká (Czech Republic) Tereza Malíková	4–6, 6–2, [10–4]
Win	12.	25 January 2014	Sunderland, UK	Hard (i)	(United Kingdom) Anna Smith	(Hungary) Ágnes Bukta (Bulgaria) Viktoriya Tomova	6–1, 6–1
Win	13.	23 February 2014	Nottingham, UK	Hard (i)	(United Kingdom) Anna Smith	(United Kingdom) Naomi Broady (Czech Republic) Renata Voráčová	7–6^{(6)}, 6–4
Loss	5.	28 February 2014	Beinasco, Italy	Clay (i)	(United Kingdom) Anna Smith	(Italy) Nicole Clerico (Italy) Giulia Gatto-Monticone	1–6, 7–5, [11–13]
Win	14.	31 March 2014	Edgbaston, UK	Hard (i)	(United Kingdom) Anna Smith	(Poland) Magda Linette (Switzerland) Amra Sadiković	3–6, 7–5, [10–4]
Win	15.	2 June 2014	Nottingham Trophy, UK	Grass	(United Kingdom) Anna Smith	(Canada) Sharon Fichman (United States) Maria Sanchez	7–6^{(5)}, 4–6, [10–5]
Win	16.	26 July 2014	Lexington Challenger, United States	Hard	(United Kingdom) Anna Smith	(Japan) Shuko Aoyama (United States) Keri Wong	6–4, 6–4
Win	17.	1 February 2015	Sunderland, UK	Hard (i)	(United Kingdom) Anna Smith	(Poland) Justyna Jegiołka (Sweden) Cornelia Lister	6–3, 6–1
Win	18.	4 April 2015	Croissy-Beaubourg, France	Hard (i)	(United Kingdom) Anna Smith	(France) Julie Coin (France) Mathilde Johansson	7–6^{(5)}, 7–6^{(2)}
Loss	6.	10 May 2015	Open de Cagnes-sur-Mer, France	Clay	(United Kingdom) Anna Smith	(United Kingdom) Johanna Konta (France) Laura Thorpe	6–1, 4–6, [5–10]
Loss	7.	4 June 2015	Eastbourne Trophy, UK	Grass	(United Kingdom) Anna Smith	(United States) Shelby Rogers (United States) CoCo Vandeweghe	5–7, 6–7^{(1)}
Win	19.	2 April 2016	ITF Croissy-Beaubourg, France	Hard (i)	(United Kingdom) Anna Smith	(Czech Republic) Lenka Kunčíková (Czech Republic) Karolína Stuchlá	6–4, 6–1
Win	20.	3 September 2016	Guiyang, China	Hard (i)	(United Kingdom) Anna Smith	(China) Wei Zhanlan (China) Zhao Qianqian	6–4, 3–6, [10–5]
Win	21.	11 November 2016	Bratislava, Slovakia	Hard (i)	(United Kingdom) Anna Smith	(Netherlands) Quirine Lemoine (Netherlands) Eva Wacanno	6–3, 6–2
Win	22.	4 February 2017	GB Pro-Series Glasgow, UK	Hard (i)	(United Kingdom) Anna Smith	(Romania) Laura Ioana Andrei (Czech Republic) Petra Krejsová	6–3, 6–2
Win	23.	19 August 2017	Vancouver Open, Canada	Hard	(Australia) Jessica Moore	(United States) Desirae Krawczyk (Mexico) Giuliana Olmos	6–1, 7–5

== Fed Cup participation ==
=== Doubles (10–3) ===
Edition	Round	Date	Location	Against	Surface	Partner	Opponents	W/L	Score
2011 Fed Cup	Europe/Africa Group I	2 February 2011	Eilat, Israel	Switzerland	Hard	(United Kingdom) Heather Watson	(Switzerland) Timea Bacsinszky (Switzerland) Amra Sadiković	W	6–4, 6–3
2011 Fed Cup	Europe/Africa Group I	4 February 2011	Eilat, Israel	Denmark	Hard	(United Kingdom) Heather Watson	(Denmark) Mai Grage (Denmark) Caroline Wozniacki	W	5–7, 7–5, 7–5
2014 Fed Cup	Europe/Africa Zone Group I	5 February 2014	Budapest, Hungary	Latvia	Hard (i)	(United Kingdom) Heather Watson	(Latvia) Diāna Marcinkēviča (Latvia) Jeļena Ostapenko	L	6–1, 5–7, 6–7^{(5–7)}
2014 Fed Cup	Europe/Africa Zone Group I	7 February 2014	Budapest, Hungary	Romania	Hard (i)	(United Kingdom) Heather Watson	(Romania) Irina-Camelia Begu (Romania) Monica Niculescu	L	0–6, 2–6
2015 Fed Cup	Europe/Africa Zone Group I	4 February 2015	Budapest, Hungary	Liechtenstein	Hard (i)	(United Kingdom) Anna Smith	(Liechtenstein) Kathinka von Deichmann (Liechtenstein) Stephanie Vogt	W	6–1, 6–2
2015 Fed Cup	Europe/Africa Zone Group I	5 February 2015	Budapest, Hungary	Turkey	Hard (i)	(United Kingdom) Anna Smith	(Turkey) Başak Eraydın (Turkey) Pemra Özgen	W	6–2, 6–1
2015 Fed Cup	Europe/Africa Zone Group I	6 February 2015	Budapest, Hungary	Ukraine	Hard (i)	(United Kingdom) Anna Smith	(Ukraine) Kateryna Kozlova (Ukraine) Olga Savchuk	W	6–2, 6–1
2016 Fed Cup	Europe/Africa Zone Group I	4 February 2016	Eilat, Israel	South Africa	Hard	(United Kingdom) Anna Smith	(South Africa) Madrie Le Roux (South Africa) Michelle Sammons	W	6–3, 6–2
2016 Fed Cup	Europe/Africa Zone Group I	5 February 2016	Eilat, Israel	(Georgia (country)) Georgia	Hard	(United Kingdom) Anna Smith	(Georgia (country)) Oksana Kalashnikova (Georgia (country)) Sofia Shapatava	L	2–6, 4–6
2017 Fed Cup	Europe/Africa Zone Group I	8 February 2017	Tallinn, Estonia	Portugal	Hard (i)	(United Kingdom) Laura Robson	(Portugal) Michelle Larcher de Brito (Portugal) Inês Murta	W	6–2, 6–3
2017 Fed Cup	Europe/Africa Zone Group I	9 February 2017	Tallinn, Estonia	Latvia	Hard (i)	(United Kingdom) Laura Robson	(Latvia) Diāna Marcinkēviča (Latvia) Daniela Vismane	W	6–0, 6–7^{(2–7)}, 6–2
2017 Fed Cup	Europe/Africa Zone Group I	10 February 2017	Tallinn, Estonia	Turkey	Hard (i)	(United Kingdom) Laura Robson	(Turkey) Ayla Aksu (Turkey) Pemra Özgen	W	6–2, 6–2
2017 Fed Cup	World Group II Play-offs	23 April 2017	Constanța, Romania	Romania	Clay	(United Kingdom) Laura Robson	(Romania) Simona Halep (Romania) Monica Niculescu	W	6–3, 1–6, [10–8]
