= Saint Lucia at the 2010 Commonwealth Games =

Sporting event delegation

Flag of Saint Lucia

Saint Lucia competed in the 2010 Commonwealth Games held in Delhi, India, from 3 to 14 October 2010.

== Medals ==
	(gold)	(silver)	(bronze)	Total
Saint Lucia	0	0	1	1

== Medalist ==
Medal	Name	Sport	Event
Bronze	Levern Spencer	Athletics	Women's High Jump

== See also ==
- 2010 Commonwealth Games
