= Sarah Lavalley =

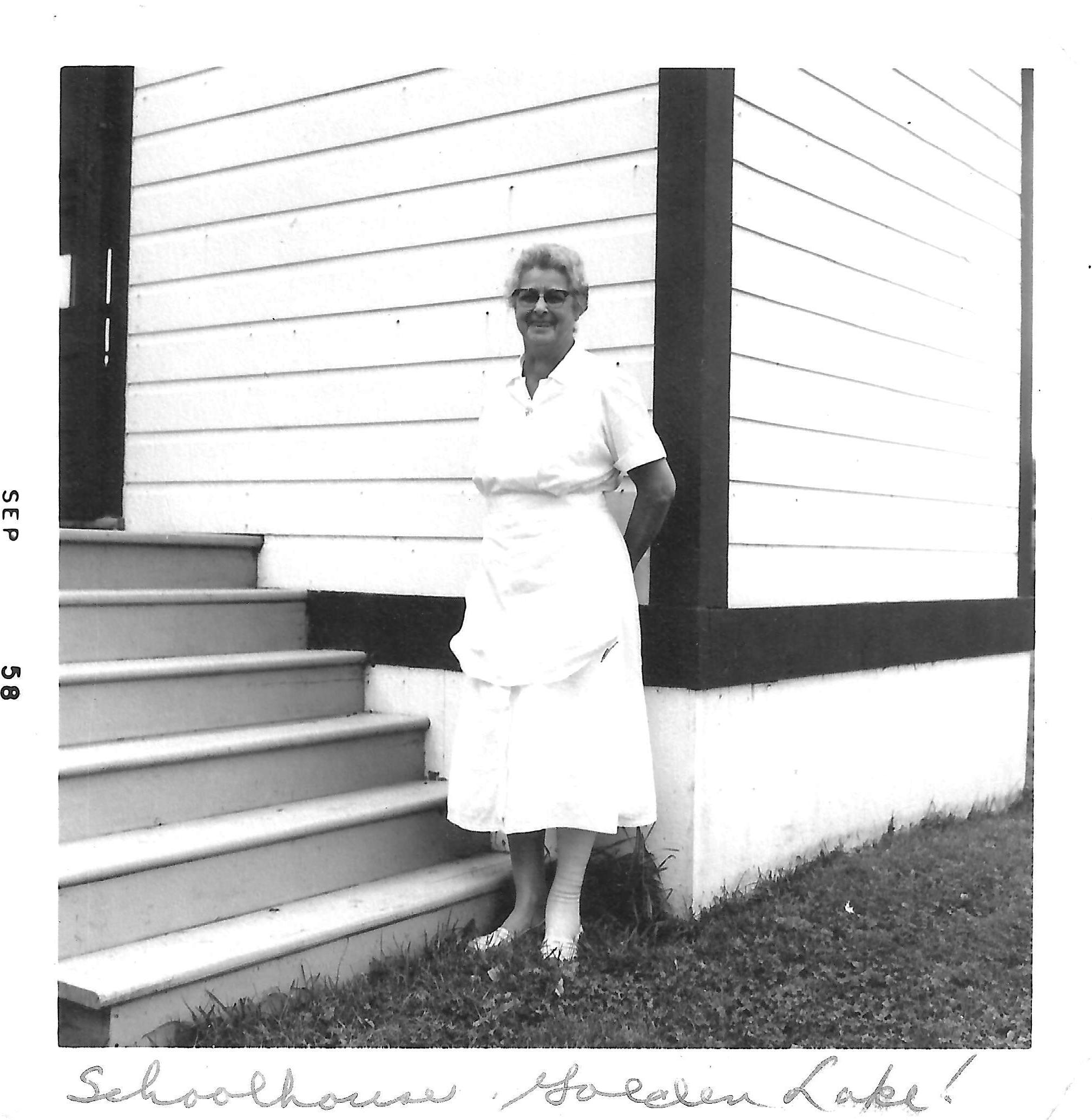
Sarah Lavalley at Golden Lake schoolhouse, Sept 1956

Sarah Lavalley (née Aird, 1895-1991) was a nurse, craftswoman, and community leader from Golden Lake Reserve. In addition to her social work, she is known for supporting cultural exchange between the Indigenous community that she was a part of and non-Indigenous people, as well as supporting cultural continuity through her teaching throughout her life. Lavalley was also known as a skilled maker using traditional patterns and stitching techniques, making wearable crafts like moccasins and mittens for instance.

== Early life ==
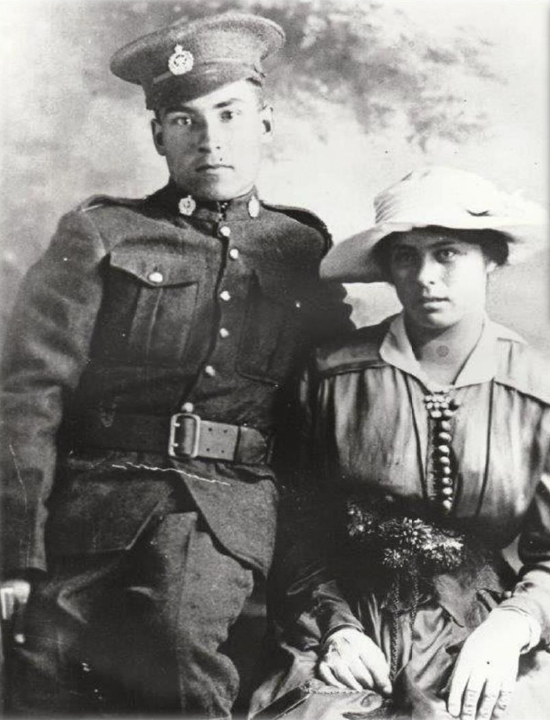
Sarah and Jim Lavalley on their wedding day, August 26, 1916

Sarah Lavalley was born on April 28, 1895, on Golden Lake (Algonquins of Pikwakanagan First Nation) Reserve. She grew up speaking only Anishinābe. Lavalley attended a day school until grade nine on Golden Lake Reserve, and attended high school in Eganville. Lavalley left school to support her family working as a household servant in Eganville and Ottawa. Lavalley also helped her grandmother Annie Mitchell with midwifery from the age of fourteen. This formative experience led to her completing some training at the Good Samaritan Catholic Hospital in Jersey City, New Jersey, at age nineteen.

Lavalley learned traditional crafts from her mother, Mary Ann Lamabe, and her mother-in-law, Annie Michell. She decorated her pieces with beadwork, usually floral and geometric motifs.

Sarah married James Lavalley in 1916. On the occasion of their fiftieth wedding anniversary the couple received letters of congratulations from political figures including Governor General Georges Vanier, Prime Minister Lester B. Pearson, Agriculture Minister Joe Greene, and Senator Norman McLeod Paterson, revealing some of the high-profile relationships that Lavalley had established. Other than a couple of brief periods spent in Ottawa and Timmins, Ontario, Sarah lived primarily on Golden Lake Reserve throughout her life. She had eight children and forty-three grandchildren.

== Community contributions ==
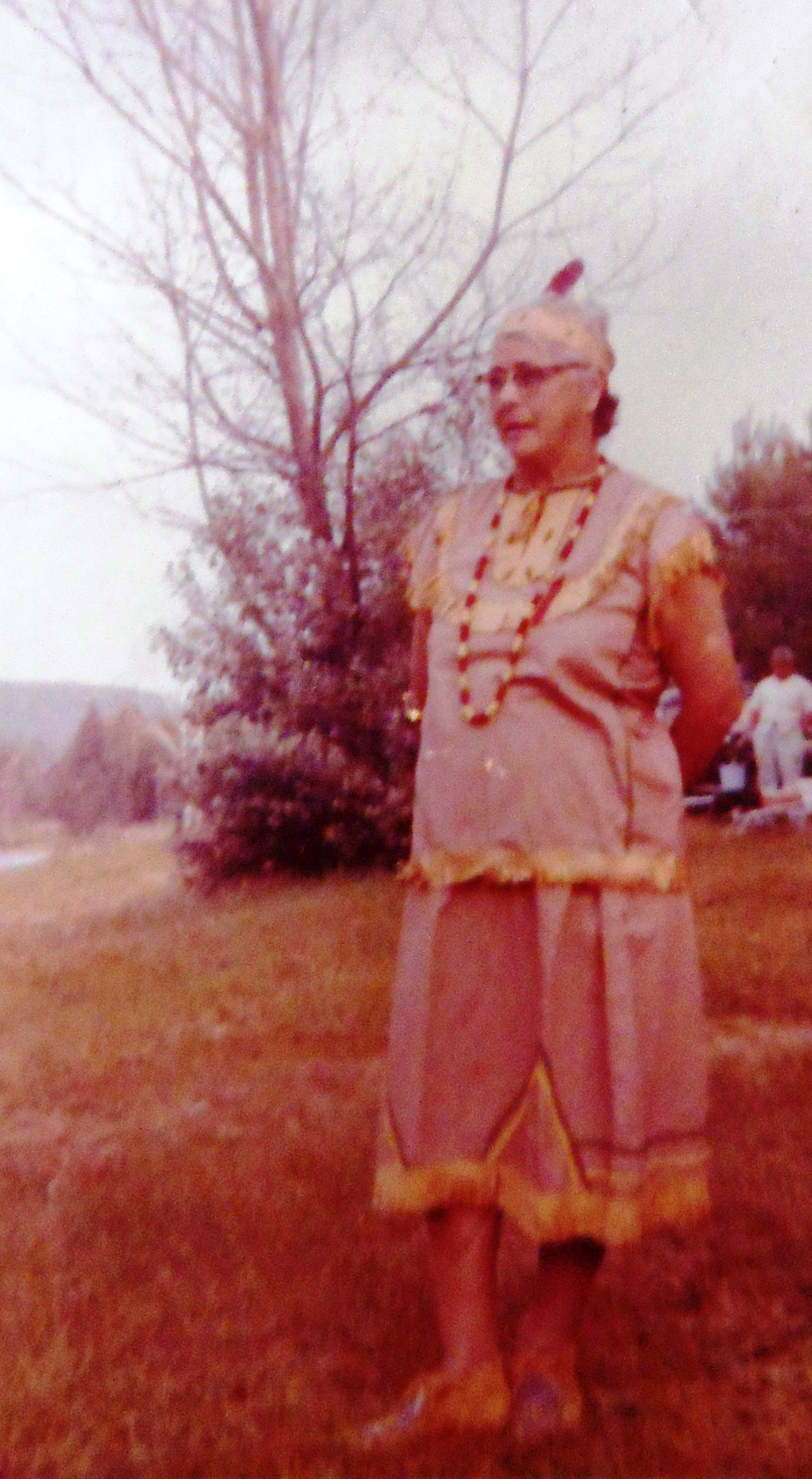
Sarah Lavalley at Opeongo Lake in 1967

Lavalley developed a reputation as a dedicated nurse at Golden Lake Reserve and Village, serving 600 villagers and 300 inhabitants on the reserve, addressing the inaccessibility of the nearest hospital. Lavalley was president of the Golden Lake Branch of the Catholic Women’s League and the Golden Lake Homemaker’s Club, where she encouraged women from the community to meet and develop skills, particularly in Indigenous crafts. Lavalley fostered cultural exchange when she taught Indigenous and non-Indigenous women craftwork and beadwork. Lavalley’s work appeared regularly since the 1940s in the Indian Crafts Pavilion at the Canadian National Exhibition in Toronto, and was sold nationally, in United States, and in Europe. She also led the Algonquin Crafts project, which provided an opportunity for makers on the reserve to sell their work. Lavalley and her brother-in-law Matthew Bernard were among the Indigenous artists who kept the arts of the Anishinābe alive during a long period of colonial oppression.

Later in her life, Sarah Lavalley acted as a consultant for linguistics research and was included in several publications, such as “Kinship Terms in Golden Lake Algonquin” by George F. Aubin, and Restoring the Balance: First Nations Women, Community, and Culture edited by Gail Guthrie Valaskakis, Eric Guimond, and Madeleine Dion Stout.

== Awards ==
Sarah Lavalley was awarded the Ontario Order of Good Citizenship Medal in June 1980. Lavalley became a member of the Order of Canada in 1981. Shortly afterwards, Lavalley was awarded the Pro Ecclesia et Pontifice medal by Pope John Paul II. She was also one of the recipients of the Union of Ontario Indians Lifetime Achievement Award in 1999.
