= Meadmore =

Meadmore is a surname. Notable people with the surname include:

- Clement Meadmore (1929–2005), Australian-American sculptor
- Glen Meadmore, Canadian musician, actor and performance artist
- Marion Ironquill Meadmore (born 1936), Canadian lawyer and activist
- Robert Meadmore, British singer and actor
- Ron Meadmore (1933-2013), Canadian football player
