= Indspire Awards =

Canadian Aboriginal Achievement Awards

The Indspire Awards, until 2012 the National Aboriginal Achievement Awards, are annual awards presented by Indspire in Canada. The awards are intended to celebrate and encourage excellence in the Aboriginal community in Canada.

== About ==
The awards were first established in 1993, and presented in 1994, in conjunction with the United Nations-declared International Decade of the World's Indigenous People. The awards are intended to celebrate and encourage excellence in the Indigenous community. Awards may be presented in a variety of categories, depending on the particular achievements of Aboriginal people in the nominating period—14 awards are presented each year including one for Lifetime Achievement and three special Youth Awards, one each for First Nations, Inuit and Métis, that comes with a cash prize of $10,000 and 10 career categories with not all individual career categories necessarily presented annually. To be eligible an individual must be of either First Nations, Inuit, or Métis heritage. Additionally they must demonstrate outstanding career achievement, and be a permanent Canadian resident or be Canadian born. The awards are broadcast annually on the Global Television Network and the Aboriginal Peoples Television Network (APTN). Since 1985 Indspire through its Education Program has awarded more than $87 million in scholarships and bursaries to more than 25,00 First Nations, Inuit and Métis students nationwide.

=== Award categories ===
The award categories are:

- Arts
- Business and Commerce
- Culture, Heritage and Spirituality
- Education
- Environment and Natural Resources
- Health
- Law and Justice
- Politics
- Public Service
- Sports
- Lifetime Achievement Award
- Youth Award, First Nation
- Youth Award, Inuit
- Youth Award, Métis

=== Eligibility criteria ===
Individuals of First Nations, Inuit, and Métis ancestry who have reached a significant level of achievement in their respective occupations are eligible for nomination. Any person may nominate a candidate they deem to be worthy of this recognition with reference to the following criteria:

- Of First Nations, Inuit or Métis heritage
- Who demonstrate outstanding career achievement
- Of any age with the exception of the youth category
- Permanent Canadian resident or Canadian born
- Youth achiever nominees must be 15–27 years of age

== Recipients ==
Each year 14 recipients are recognized for their outstanding accomplishments in various disciplines ranging from health, law, political science, culture, arts, and others, two of which are specific recognition to one outstanding youth achiever and one lifetime achievement recipient. The awards are recognized both nationally and internationally as one of the highest honours the community can bestow upon its own achievers.

=== 1994 ===
- William Lyall, Business
- Jean Cuthand Goodwill, Community Service
- Verna Kirkness, Education
- Cindy Kenny-Gilday, Environment
- Alanis Obomsawin, Film
- Murray Sinclair, Justice
- Bill Reid, Lifetime Achievement
- Susan Aglukark, Performance
- Thelma Chalifoux, Public Service
- Nellie Cournoyea, Public Service
- Rosemarie Kuptana, Public Service
- Art Solomon, Spiritual Leadership
- Ted Nolan, Sports

=== 1995 ===
- Douglas Cardinal, Architecture
- Robert Davidson, Arts and Culture
- Frank Hansen, Business and Culture
- Louis Stevenson, Community Development
- Ernest Benedict, Education
- Marie Smallface Marule, Education
- Ahab Spence, Education
- Matthew Coon Come, Environment and Public Service
- Maggie Hodgson, Health Services
- Alfred Scow, Law and Justice
- Kenojuak Ashevak, Lifetime Achievement
- Noah Carpenter, Medicine
- Sharla Tiakohatéhkwen Howard, Special Youth
- Angela Chalmers, Sports

=== 1996 ===
- Maria Campbell, Arts
- Tom Jackson, Arts
- Rose Auger, Culture, Heritage & Spirituality
- James Watson Walkus, Culture, Heritage & Spirituality
- Marlene Brant Castellano, Education
- Mary Simon, Environment and Natural Resources
- Frank Arthur Calder, Lifetime Achievement
- Yvon Dumont, Public Service
- Phil Fontaine, Public Service
- Elijah Harper, Public Service
- Albert Charles Rock, Science and Technology
- Robert E. Johnson Jr., Special Youth
- Alwyn Morris, Sports
- Mary Two-Axe Earley, Women's Rights

=== 1997 ===
- Kiawak Ashoona, Arts
- Gil Cardinal, Arts
- Graham Greene, Arts
- Rita Joe, Arts
- Billy Diamond, Business & Commerce
- Charlie Watt, Community Development
- Stanley John McKay, Culture, Heritage & Spirituality
- Martin Gale McLoughlin, Health
- Chester R. Cunningham, Law & Justice
- Harry S. LaForme, Law & Justice
- Olive Dickason, Lifetime Achievement
- Stephen Kakfwi, Public Service
- George Berthe, Special Youth
- Darren Zack, Sports

=== 1998 ===
- Tantoo Cardinal, Arts
- Daphne Odjig, Arts
- Tagak Curley, Business & Commerce
- Abel Bosum, Community Development
- Emily Jane Faries, Education
- Cornelia Wieman, Health
- Joe Crowshoe, Heritage and Spirituality
- Roberta Jamieson, Law & Justice
- Buffy Sainte-Marie, Lifetime Achievement
- John Amagoalik, Public Service
- Georges Erasmus, Public Service
- Dan E. Goodleaf, Public Service
- Wade R. Cachagee, Special Youth
- Bryan Trottier, Sports

=== 1999 ===
- Dorothy Grant, Business & Commerce
- David Gabriel Tuccaro, Business & Commerce
- Dorothy Betz, Community Development
- Theresa Stevenson, Community Development
- Mitiarjuk Nappaaluk, Culture, Heritage & Spirituality
- Howard Adams, Education
- Malcolm King, Health
- Edward Kantonkote Cree, Health
- James Igloliorte, Law & Justice
- Rose Toodick Boyko, Law & Justice
- Allen Sapp, Lifetime Achievement
- James Bartleman, Public Service
- Lillian Dyck, Science
- ‘Alika LaFontaine, Youth

=== 2000 ===
- Art Thompson, Arts
- John Charles Bernard, Business & Commerce
- Roy Albert Whitney, Business & Commerce
- Paul J. Birckel, Community Development
- Simon Baker, Culture, Heritage & Spirituality
- Edith Josie, Culture, Heritage & Spirituality
- Jo-Ann Archibald, Education
- Miles G. Richardson, Environment and Natural Resources
- Fjola Hart-Wasekeesikaw, Health
- Steven Point, Law & Justice
- Joseph Arthur Gosnell, Lifetime Achievement
- Leetia Ineak, Media & Communication
- Konrad Haskan Sioui, Public Service
- Waneek Horn-Miller, Special Youth

=== 2001 ===
- Tomson Highway, Arts
- Dolly Watts, Business & Commerce
- Fred House, Community Development
- Mariano Aupilardjuk, Culture, Heritage & Spirituality
- Freda Ahenakew, Education
- Mary Thomas, Environment and Natural Resources
- Lindsay Crowshoe, Health
- Harold Cardinal, Lifetime Achievement
- Roman Bittman, Media & Communication
- Zacharias Kunuk, Media & Communication
- Leonard Marchand, Public Service
- Richard Nerysoo, Public Service
- Nick Sibbeston, Public Service
- Lance Relland, Special Youth

=== 2002 ===
- Ohito Ashoona, Arts
- Freda Diesing, Arts
- Harry Deneron, Business & Commerce
- Leonard (Len) G. Flett, Business & Commerce
- George Kurszewski, Community Development
- Noel Knockwood, Culture, Heritage & Spirituality
- Roy Fox, Energy
- Gilles Pinette, Health
- Alex Janvier, Lifetime Achievement
- Gail Guthrie Valaskakis, Media & Communication
- Jonah Kelly, Media & Communication
- Joseph Tokwiro Norton, Public Service
- Jordin Tootoo, Special Youth
- Michael Nepinak, Sports

=== 2003 ===
- John Arcand, Arts
- Tom King, Arts
- Mel E. Benson, Business & Commerce
- Gary Bosgoed, Business & Commerce
- Mary Richard, Community Development
- Charles Edward Lennie, Culture, Heritage & Spirituality
- Leroy Little Bear, Education
- Simon Lucas, Environment and Natural Resources
- Judith Bartlett, Health
- Jay Wortman, Health
- John J. Borrows, Law & Justice
- Robbie Robertson, Lifetime Achievement
- Sophie Pierre, Public Service
- Matthew Dunn, Special Youth

=== 2004 ===
- Tina Keeper, Arts
- Susan Point, Arts
- Osuitok Ipeelee, Arts
- Clarence Louie, Business & Commerce
- Basil Johnston, Culture, Heritage & Spirituality
- Carl Urion, Education
- Sheila Watt-Cloutier, Environment and Natural Resources
- Stanley Vollant, Health
- Muriel Stanley Venne, Law & Justice
- Andrew T. Delisle Sr., Lifetime Achievement
- Suzanne Rochon-Burnett, Media & Communication
- Pearl Calahasen, Public Service
- Lee Wilson, Science and Technology
- Kristinn Frederickson, Special Youth

=== 2005 ===
- Joe Jacobs, Arts
- Gerald McMaster, Arts
- Douglas Golosky, Business & Commerce
- Judy Gingell, Community Development
- John Joe Sark, Culture, Heritage & Spirituality
- Eber Hampton, Education
- Emma LaRocque, Education
- Andy Carpenter Sr., Environment and Natural Resources
- Thomas Dignan, Health
- Bertha Allen, Lifetime Achievement
- Brenda Chambers, Media & Communication
- Lolly Annahatak, Social Services
- Fauna Kingdon, Special Youth
- Sharon Anne Firth, Sports

=== 2006 ===
- Jane Ash Poitras, Arts
- Bernd Christmas, Business & Commerce
- Wendy Grant-John, Community Development
- Gladys Taylor Cook, Culture, Heritage & Spirituality
- Taiaiake (Gerald) Alfred, Education
- Billy Day, Environment and Natural Resources
- Herb Belcourt, Housing
- James (Sakej) Youngblood Henderson, Law & Justice
- Jim Sinclair, Lifetime Achievement
- Myra Cree, Media & Communication
- George Tuccaro, Media & Communication
- Tony Belcourt, Public Service
- Andrea Dykstra, Special Youth
- Shirley Firth Larsson, Sports

=== 2007 ===
- Joane Cardinal-Schubert, Arts
- Jack Poole, Business & Commerce
- Alestine Andre, Culture, Heritage & Spirituality
- Joe Michel, Education
- David Walkem, Environment and Natural Resources
- Joseph Couture, Health
- Hugh Braker, Law & Justice
- Bertha Clark Jones, Lifetime Achievement
- Lisa Meeches, Media & Communication
- Fred Carmichael, Politics
- Lewis Cardinal, Public Service
- James Makokis, Special Youth
- Wegadesk Gorup-Paul, Sports
- Monica Peters, Technology & Trades

=== 2008 ===
- Shirley Cheechoo, Arts
- Jim Boucher, Business & Commerce
- Hubert Skye, Culture, Heritage & Spirituality
- Marie Ann Battiste, Education
- Elizabeth (Tshaukuesh) Penashue, Environment and Natural Resources
- Jeff Reading, Health
- David C. Nahwegahbow, Law & Justice
- Norval Morrisseau, Lifetime Achievement
- Paul Andrew, Media & Communication
- Joe Handley, Politics
- Sylvia B. Maracle, Public Service
- Boyd Wesley Benjamin, Special Youth
- Reggie Leach, Sports

=== 2009 ===
- Melanie Jackson, Arts
- Dennis Jackson, Arts
- Allan C. McLeod, Business & Commerce
- Stephen J. Augustine, Culture, Heritage & Spirituality
- Cecil King, Education
- Gordon W. Prest, Environment and Natural Resources
- Candace Grier-Lowe, Health
- Delia Opekokew, Law & Justice
- Stan Cuthand, Lifetime Achievement
- Carol Morin, Media & Communication
- Paul Okalik, Politics
- Joan Glode, Public Service
- Chelsea Lavallée, Special Youth
- Adam Sioui, Sports
- Mervin J. Dewasha, Technology & Trades

=== 2010 ===
- Kananginak Pootoogook, Arts
- Ellen Melcosky, Business & Commerce
- Tom Crane Bear, Culture, Heritage & Spirituality
- Raoul J. McKay, Education
- Danny Beaton, Environment and Natural Resources
- Madeleine Kētēskwew Dion Stout, Health
- Donald Worme, Law & Justice
- William Commanda, Lifetime
- Kenneth Atsenhaienton Deer, Media & Communication
- Eric Robinson, Politics
- Edith Cloutier, Public Service
- Skawenniio Barnes, Special Youth
- Monica Pinette, Sports
- Doug Henry, Technology & Trades

=== 2011 ===
- Corrine Hunt, Arts
- Joseph F. Dion, Business & Commerce
- Paingut Annie Peterloosie, Culture, Heritage & Spirituality
- Margo L. Greenwood, Education
- Ronald Edward Sparrow, Environment & Natural Resources
- Marcia Anderson DeCoteau, Health
- Roger Jones, Law & Justice
- Lillian McGregor, Lifetime
- Jean LaRose, Media & Communications
- Audrey Poitras, Politics
- Cindy Blackstock, Public Service
- Teyotsihstokwáthe Dakota Brant, Special Youth
- Frederick G. Sasakamoose, Sports
- Duncan Cree, Technology & Trades

=== 2012 ===
- Adam Beach, Arts
- Victor S. Buffalo, Business & Commerce
- Dave Courchene, Culture, Heritage & Spirituality
- Leona Makokis, Education
- Richard Stewart Hardy, Environment & Natural Resources
- Janet Smylie, Health
- Violet Ford, Law & Justice
- Gerry St. Germain, Lifetime
- Richard Wagamese, Media & Communications
- Leona Aglukkaq, Politics
- Edward John, Politics
- Minnie Grey, Public Service
- Richard Peter, Sports
- Earl Cook, Youth
- Candace Sutherland, Youth

=== 2013 ===
- Jacqueline Guest, Arts
- Charlie Evalik, Business & Commerce
- Winston Wuttunee Culture, Heritage & Spirituality
- Shawn A-in-chut Atleo, Education
- Lloyd (Sonny) Flett, Environment & Natural Resources
- Ruby Jacobs, Health
- Viola Robinson, Law & Justice
- Alex Van Bibber, Lifetime Achievement
- Duane Smith, Politics
- Gail Cyr, Public Service
- Theoren Fleury, Sports
- Gabrielle Scrimshaw, Youth First Nation
- Elizabeth Zarpa, Youth Inuit
- Graham Kotowich, Youth Métis

=== 2014 ===
- Kent Monkman, Arts
- Marie Yvonne Delorme, Business & Commerce
- Maggie Paul, Culture, Heritage & Spirituality
- Rita Bouvier, Education
- Charlie Snowshoe, Environment & Natural Resources
- Evan Tlesla II Adams, Health
- Marion Meadmore, Law & Justice
- James Eetoolook, Lifetime Achievement
- Stewart Philip, Politics
- Robert Watts, Public Service
- Mary Spencer, Sports
- John Nicholas Jeddore, Youth First Nation
- Sarah Arngna’naaq, Youth Inuit
- Christie Lavallée, Youth Métis
- Kristinn Frederickson, Youth Special

=== 2015 ===
- Ron E. Scott, Arts
- Brenda La Rose, Business and Commerce
- Peter Irniq, Culture, Heritage & Spirituality
- Paulette C. Tremblay, Education
- Gerald Anderson, Environment and Natural Resources
- William Julius Mussell, Health
- Wilton Littlechild, Law and Justice
- Elsie Yanik, Lifetime Achievement
- Kim Baird, Politics
- Madeleine Redfern, Public Service
- Gino Odjick, Sports
- Jordan Konek, Youth
- Kendal Netmaker, Youth
- Gabrielle Fayant, Youth Métis

=== 2016 ===
- Joseph Boyden, Arts
- Clint Davis, Business and Commerce
- Jim Ochiese, Culture, Heritage, & Spirituality
- Mae Louise Campbell, Culture, Heritage, & Spirituality
- Jo-Ann Episkenew, Education
- Pat Mandy, Health
- Mark L’Hirondelle Stevenson, Law and Justice
- Robert Joseph, Lifetime Achievement
- Mike Kanentakeron Mitchell, Politics
- Leonard George, Public Service
- Carey Price, Sports
- Christian Kowalchuk, Youth Recipient
- Killulark (Laura) Arngna’naaq, Youth Recipient
- Zondra Roy, Youth Recipient

=== 2017 ===
- Cece Hodgson-McCauley, Politics
- Doreen Spence, Culture, Heritage & Spirituality
- Duncan McCue, Public Service
- Heather Kashman, Sports
- Jan Kahehti:io Longboat, Culture, Heritage & Spirituality
- Josh Butcher, Youth
- Kimberly R. Murray BA, LL.B, IPC, Law & Justice
- Maatalii Okalik, Youth
- Nathan Matthew, Education
- Phillip “Jerry” Asp, Business & Commerce
- Senator Murray Sinclair, Lifetime Achievement
- Tekatsi:tsia’kwa Katsi Cook, Health
- Thomas Dymond, Youth

=== 2018 ===
- Ashley Callingbull, Youth - First Nation Recipient
- Dr. Donna May Kimmaliardjuk, Youth - Inuit Recipient
- Dr. Evelyn Voyageur, Health
- Dr. Gloria Cranmer Webster, Lifetime Achievement
- Dr. Lorna Wanosts’a7 Williams, Education
- Dr. Mike DeGagné, Public Service
- Greg Hill, Arts
- Kye7e Cecilia Dick DeRose, Culture, Heritage & Spirituality
- Michael Linklater, Sports
- Nicole Bourque-Bouchier, Business & Commerce
- Paul Chartrand, Law & Justice
- Theland Kicknosway, Culture, Heritage & Spirituality
- Tracie Léost, Youth - Métis Recipient

=== 2019 ===
- Atuat Akittirq, Lifetime Achievement
- Barbara Todd Hager, Arts
- Billy-Ray Belcourt, Youth - First Nation Recipient
- Brigette Lacquette, Sports
- Dianne Corbiere, Law & Justice
- Dr. Marlyn Cook, Health
- Dr. Vianne Timmons, Education
- Grand Chief Ronald Derrickson, Business & Commerce
- James Lavallée, Youth - Métis Recipient
- Jijuu Mary Snowshoe, Culture, Heritage & Spirituality
- Kelly Fraser, Youth - Inuit Recipient
- Peter Dinsdale, Public Service

=== 2020 ===
- Alicia Aragutak, Youth - Inuit Recipient
- Ta'Kaiya Blaney, Youth - First Nation Recipient
- Claudette Commanda, Culture, Heritage & Spirituality
- Jeannette Corbiere Lavell, Lifetime Achievement
- Marian Jacko, Law & Justice
- Karen Lawford, Health
- Candice Lys, Education
- Dawn Madahbee Leach, Business & Commerce
- Alana Robert, Youth - Métis Recipient
- Cowboy Smithx, Arts (revoked in 2020)
- Gina Wilson, Public Service

=== 2021 ===
- Lesley Hampton, Youth
- Mitchell MacDougall, Youth
- Justin Langan, Youth
- Drew Hayden Taylor, Arts
- Rosa Walker, Business and Commerce
- Emily Angulalik, Culture, Heritage, and Spirituality
- Lorne Gladu, Education
- Catherine Cook, Health
- Val Napoleon, Law and Justice
- Nahanni Fontaine, Public Service
- Dallas Soonias, Sports
- Qapik Attagutsiak, Lifetime Achievement

=== 2022 ===
- Shayla Oulette-Stonechild, Youth
- Melissa Attagutsiak, Youth
- Tristen Durocher, Youth
- David Wolfman, Arts
- Jenn Harper, Business & Commerce
- Siyamiyateliot Elizabeth Phillips, Culture, Heritage & Spirituality
- Annette Trimbee, Education
- Melanie MacKinnon, Health
- Cheryl Arcand-Kootenay, Law & Justice
- Terry Goodtrack, Public Service
- Terry Felix, Sport
- Marjorie White, Lifetime Achievement

=== 2023 ===
- Reanna Merasty, Youth
- Willow Allen, Youth
- Ruby Bruce, Youth
- Sandra Laronde, Arts
- Kylik Kisoun Taylor, Business and Commerce
- Jennine Krauchi, Culture, Heritage, and Spirituality
- Lori Campbell, Education
- Dr. Christopher Mushquash, Health
- Madame Justice Ardith Walkem, Law and Justice
- Shirley Cuillierrier, Public Service
- Joe Dion Buffalo, Sports
- Albert Marshall, Lifetime Achievement

=== 2024 ===
- Adam Gauthier, Youth
- Braden Kadlum, Youth
- Dr. Jayelle Friesen, Youth
- Eden Robinson, Arts
- Victoria LaBillois, Business and Commerce
- Edna Manitowabi, Culture, Heritage, and Spirituality
- Kanonhsyonne Jan Hill, Education
- Lea Bill, Health
- Ronald Eric Ignace, Language
- Michelle O'Bonsawin, Law and Justice
- Jocelyn Formsma, Public Service
- Thomas V. Hill, Lifetime Achievement

=== 2025 ===
- Tréchelle Bunn, Youth
- Arsaniq Deer, Youth
- Madelaine McCracken, Youth
- Michelle Good, Arts
- Colby Delorme, Business and Commerce
- Brian MacDonald, Culture, Heritage, and Spirituality
- Edith Loring-Kuhanga, Education
- Dr. Shannon McDonald, Health
- Bertha Rabesca Zoe, Law and Justice
- Diane Redsky, Public Service
- Ivy Richardson, Sports
- Harvey McCue (Waubageshig), Lifetime Achievement

=== 2026 ===
- Tia Wood, Youth
- Simik Komaksiutsiksak, Youth
- Garrett Hrechka, Youth
- Jessica Brown, Arts
- Aaron Joe, Business and Commerce
- Albert Dumont, Culture, Heritage, and Spirituality
- André O'Bonsawin, Education
- Dr. Mona Lisa Bourque Bearskin, Health
- Naiomi Walqwan Metallic, Law and Justice
- Jeremy Dutcher, Music
- Annette Morgan, Public Service
- Bernard A. "Buzz" Manuel, Sports
- Fred Kelly (Kizhebowse Makwa), Lifetime Achievement

== See also ==
- Aboriginal Canadian personalities
