= Wieman =

Wieman is a surname. Notable people with the name include:

- Carl Wieman (born 1951), American physicist and educationist
- Cornelia Wieman (born 1964), Canadian psychiatrist
- Henry Nelson Wieman (1884–1975), American philosopher and theologian
- Howard Wieman (born 1942), American nuclear physicist
- Julius L. Wieman (1864–1902), American politician from New York
- Mathias Wieman (1902–1969), German actor
- Tad Wieman (1896–1971), American college football player, coach, athletics administrator

== See also ==
- Wieman v. Updegraff, 344 U.S. 183 (1952)
