= Jo-Ann Archibald =

Canadian indigenous studies scholar

Jo-Ann Archibald OC
- Q’um Q’um Xiiem
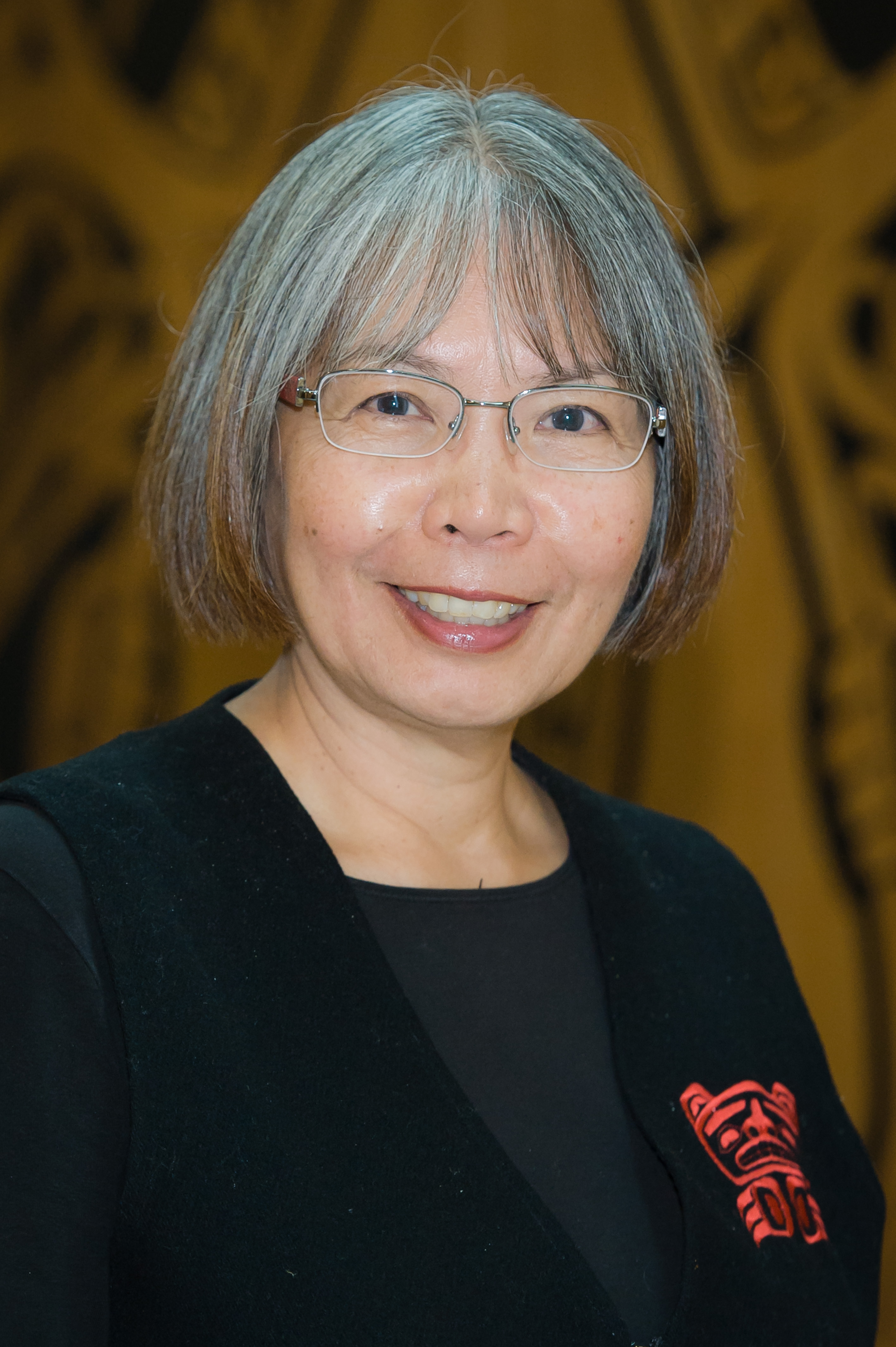
- Archibald receiving the SFU Outstanding Alumni Award in 2012
- Born: Chilliwack
- Occupations: Teacher, academic, author

Academic background
- Education: University of British Columbia, Simon Fraser University
- Thesis: Coyote learns to make a storybasket : the place of First Nations stories in education (1997)

Jo-Ann Archibald, also known as Q’um Q’um Xiiem OC, is an Indigenous studies scholar from the Sto:lo First Nation in British Columbia, Canada.

Archibald completed her Bachelor of Education at the University of British Columbia (UBC) in 1972. She was awarded a Master's degree in 1984 and a Ph.D in 1997, both from Simon Fraser University. Archibald was a member of the board of directors at the First Nations House of Learning at UBC and was also its Director from 1993 to 2001.

Archibald is a former Associate Dean for Indigenous Education in Educational studies at UBC and a supervisor for the Native Indigenous Teacher Education Program (NITEP) from 1985 to 1992. Archibald was the Director for the International Research Institute for Maori and Indigenous Education after she established a formal relationship between the UBC and the University of Auckland. Archibald focuses a lot of her research on the importance of indigenous story work in the classroom.

== Achievements ==
Archibald received the Justice Achievement Award in 1995 from the National Association for Court Management for her development of First Nations justice curriculum. In 2000 she won the National Aboriginal Achievement Award for Education. The American Educational Research Association awarded her the Scholars of Color Distinguished Career Contribution Award in 2013.

== Work ==
Archibald has frequently published work and has sat on many advisory boards for different books. These books include

- Bridging Two Peoples: Chief Peter E. Jones, 1943-1909 by Allan Sherwin,
- Aboriginal Peoples in Canadian Cities: Transformations and Continuities edited by Heather A. Howard, and Craig Proulx,
- Indigenous Politics in Canada edited by Neal McLeod,
- The Nature of Empires and the Empires of Nature: Indigenous Peoples and the Great Lakes Environment edited by Karl S. Hele,
- Arts of Engagement: Taking Aesthetic Action in and Beyond Canada’s Truth and Reconciliation Commission edited by Dylan Robinson and Keavy Martin,
- Literary Land Claims: The "Indian Land Question" from Pontiac’s War to Attawapiskat by Margery Fee,
- Learn, Teach, Challenge: Approaching Indigenous Literatures edited by Deanna Reder and Linda M. Morra.

=== Books ===
- Indigenous Storywork: Educating the Heart, Mind, Body, and Spirit
- Learning, Knowing, Sharing: Celebrating Successes in K-12 Aboriginal Education in British Columbia

=== Articles ===
- Transforming First Nations Research With Respect and Power
- Introduction: Through Our Eyes and In Our Own Words
- Tracking Education Career Path and Employment Status of BC Teachers of Aboriginal Ancestry Report
- Ravens Response to Teacher Education: NITEP, An Indigenous Story
- Elders’ Teachings About Indigenous Storywork For Education
