= Elsie Yanik =

Canadian Métis elder and community leader

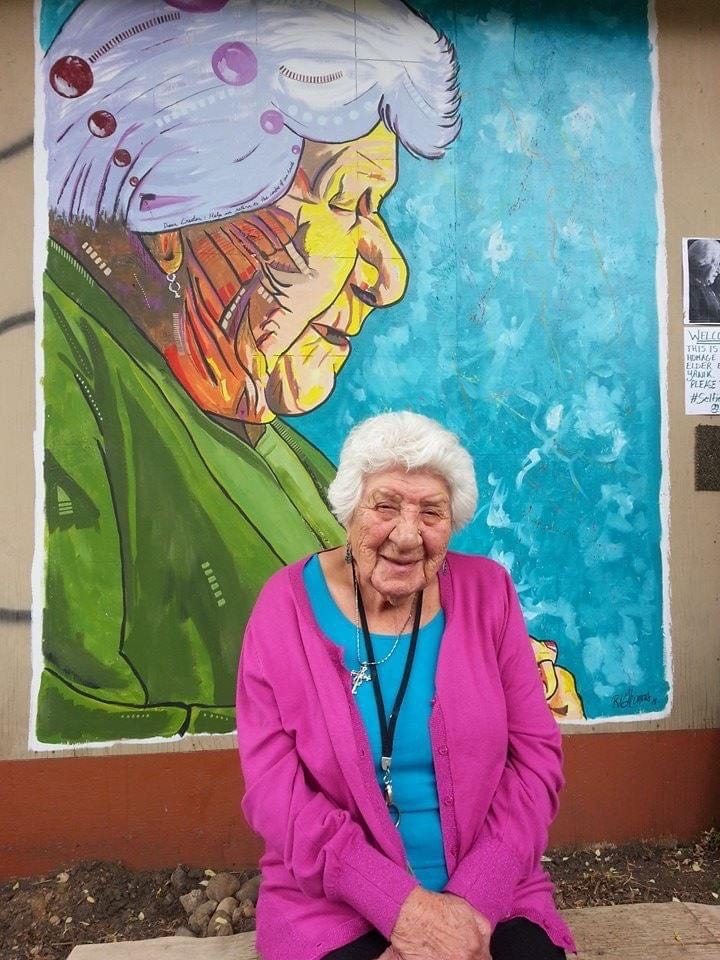
Elsie Yanik

Elsie Yanik (born Elsie Rose Larocque; 25 September 1917 – 27 November 2016) was a Canadian Métis elder and community leader. She was known for her contributions to Indigenous advocacy, spiritual leadership, health promotion, and volunteer service in the Wood Buffalo region in northern Alberta.

== Early life and education ==
Elsie was born in Fort Fitzgerald, Alberta, the sixth of eleven children born to parents Mary Flett and Henry Larocque. After her mother died when she was eight years old, she was sent to the Grey Nuns Convent in Fort Resolution, Northwest Territories. At 17 she left the convent to attend a nurses’ aide program in Fort Smith.

== Community Involvement ==
In 1936, Elsie married Lawrence Yanik. They lived in Fort Chipewyan for over 40 years. Yanik was deeply involved in the Dene, Cree, and Métis community. She was known for her skills in traditional crafts such as parka making and beading, and she shared this knowledge by teaching others. Yanik was also an active member of the Catholic Women's League. In the absence of a resident priest in the community, she served as a lay minister, officiating at baptisms, weddings, and funerals.

Yanik served as president of the board of Voice of Native Women of Alberta and volunteered on the Young Offenders Board. At the Nunee Health Authority in Fort Chipewyan, she promoted culturally grounded Indigenous health services.

She encouraged Indigenous youth to pursue education, drawing on her personal experience to illustrate the importance of lifelong learning.

== Recognition and Legacy ==
Yanik received many awards and honors during her lifetime. These included a blessing from Pope John Paul II, the Governor General’s Commemorative Medal, the Stars of Alberta Volunteer Award, and the Indspire Lifetime Achievement Award in 2015. She was awarded an honorary Doctor of Laws degree from the University of Alberta in 2014 and an honorary diploma from Keyano College.

Yanik was an olympic torch-bearer for the 2010 Winter Games.

In 2017, the Fort McMurray Catholic School District named a new school in her honour: Elsie Yanik Catholic School.

The Diocese of Mackenzie-Fort Smith established the Elsie Yanik Award in 1997 to recognize individuals who demonstrate service and commitment to their communities.

University of Alberta awards the Dr Elsie Yanik Scholarship in Nursing and the Dr Elsie Yanik Scholarship in Native Studies.

Keyano College awards The Elsie Yanik Memorial Scholarship for demonstrated Indigenous identity, advocacy and community involvement.

In 2014 Russell Thomas painted a mural of Yanik in Fort McMurray.
