= Roman Bittman =

Canadian film and television producer

Roman Norbert Bittman (June 5, 1941 - November 7, 2017) was a Canadian film and television producer, most noted as a longtime producer of news and current affairs for the Canadian Broadcasting Corporation.

Born in Fort Vermilion, Alberta to a German Canadian father and a Métis mother, Bittman grew up in Hay River, Northwest Territories. As a high school student, he volunteered for a new local community radio station in the community, and was one of just two students from the Northwest Territories selected to participate in a national student event at the Stratford Festival in 1960. He pursued postsecondary studies in the film and television program at Ryerson University, and worked for CBC News before becoming producer of the documentary series The Nature of Things. He also produced a number of short documentary films for the National Film Board, and was a partner in his wife Marilyn Belec's independent production firm Mobius Productions.

In 1993, Bittman was named as head of the Nova Scotia Film Development Corporation. In this role he helped to pass legislation creating a provincial tax credit for film and television production, and introduced an ambitious plan to build and operate the province's first full sound stage, but was dismissed from the role in 1996 after the NSFDC board rejected his financing plan.

Thereafter Bittman worked primarily in efforts to improve indigenous representation in media, including serving on the inaugural board of the Aboriginal Peoples Television Network, and serving as a mentor in a special program for indigenous screenwriters at the Banff Centre. He was awarded a National Aboriginal Achievement Award in the Arts & Media category in 2001, and subsequently served as interim CEO of the National Aboriginal Achievement Foundation in 2004-05 and as executive producer of the awards gala in 2005 and 2006.

Bittman died in Toronto, Ontario in 2017. At the 7th Canadian Screen Awards in 2019, he received a posthumous Board of Directors Tribute Award from the Academy of Canadian Cinema and Television.
