= Healing of the Seven Generations =

Indigenous community centre in Kitchener, Ontario, Canada

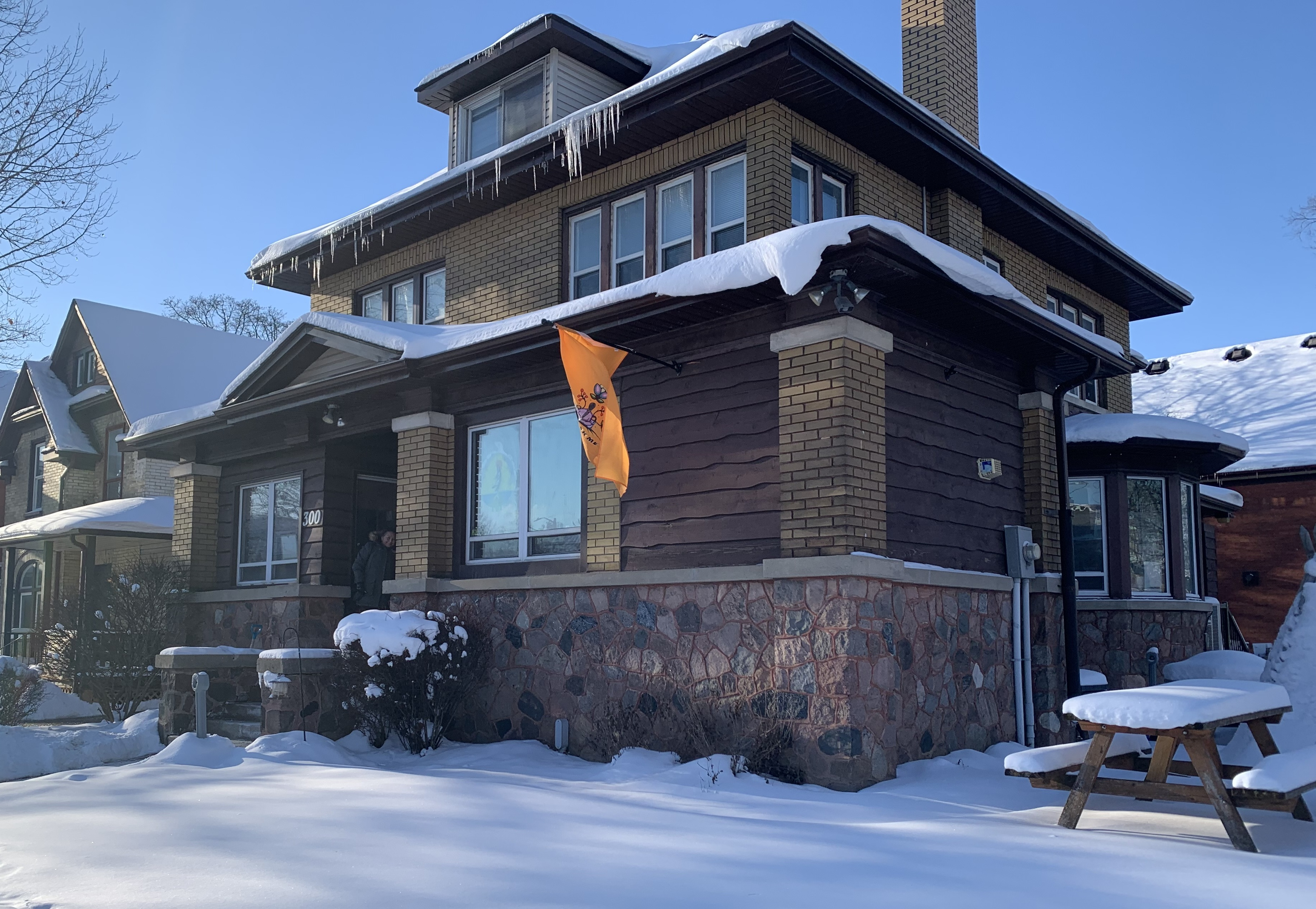
- The centre in 2026
- Abbreviation: H7G
- Formation: April 29, 2004; 22 years ago
- Founder: Donna Dubie
- Type: Nonprofit; community centre
- Purpose: Counselling; restorative justice
- Location: Kitchener, Ontario, Canada
- Coordinates: 43.4561455°N 80.4775155°W
- Website: healingofthesevengenerations.ca

Healing of the Seven Generations (H7G) is a nonprofit Indigenous community centre in Kitchener, Ontario, Canada. It was founded in 2004 by Donna Dubie, a Mohawk woman whose father escaped a residential school. She founded it after working at an Indigenous employment organization and having difficulty placing clients with drug addictions. She worked with Ginette Lafrenière, an assistant professor of social work at Wilfrid Laurier University, on a proposal to receive funding from the Aboriginal Healing Foundation. H7G continued a working relationship with the university. Students volunteered at H7G, Dubie spoke in classes, and Laurier hosted a conference to create trust between local Indigenous organizations.

H7G offers support groups, therapy, and educational workshops to Indigenous people, especially those who attended residential schools. It served a pilot group of 15 people but grew to 100 members by 2005. Lafrenière helped request funds for a canoe-building project in 2009. After, H7G focused more on youth and restorative justice. It became financially stable, receiving grants from the Ontario Trillium Foundation for teaching circles at the Grand Valley Institution for Women as well as healing retreats. In the 2010s, H7G collected school supplies and shoes for Indigenous children. It led canoe paddling events which paired an Indigenous person with a justice worker. It has held yearly community walks since the National Day for Truth and Reconciliation was recognized as a national holiday in 2021.

== Background ==
Canada's residential school system attempted to assimilate Indigenous peoples into a dominant white, European culture. The schools were funded by the Canadian government and run by various Christian churches. The system was active between 1892 and 1969 before the government withdrew, but schools existed as early as 1800, and some continued running into the 1980s. Around 150,000 Indigenous students were removed from their communities, and many faced sexual, physical, and emotional abuse. They were punished for speaking to siblings of the opposite sex, using their language, or trying to escape. Higher rates of suicide, drug abuse, and domestic violence have resulted in Indigenous communities across Canada.

Healing of the Seven Generations (H7G) was founded by Donna Dubie, a Mohawk woman and member of the Six Nations of the Grand River. Her father was sent by authorities to the Mohawk Institute Residential School in Brantford. He attended for nine years and told her about being starved, beaten, and forced to dispose of babies born of raped students. His third escape attempt was successful. Dubie was raised outside the reserve in Toronto, and she recalled that local Indigenous families were dysfunctional. Her father perpetuated the abuse he faced; she said he beat her with a belt and punched her. Dubie was a high school dropout and alcoholic involved in two abusive marriages. She became emotionally and financially stable after becoming a factory worker and union member in Brantford and being counselled by elders and medicine people at the Pine Tree Native Centre. The counsellors helped her get a diploma in social work, and she became an employment counsellor at an Indigenous organization in Kitchener.

== History ==
=== Founding and collaboration with Wilfrid Laurier University ===
Dubie's experience working in Kitchener compelled her to found H7G. She became frustrated that many clients would return to her after a few months in a job or training program because they were laid off, quit, or renewed their drug or alcohol addictions. The factory in Brantford once called her offering up to 40 jobs for her clients, but Dubie could not place anyone because of drug abuse, which she thought was an effect of the residential school system. In 2002, she asked the centre to develop a healing program that clients would take before finding employment, but her supervisor and board were not interested.

Dubie quit her job to draft a proposal requesting funding from the Aboriginal Healing Foundation (AHF) to create H7G. This required dozens of letters of support and an established organization to be a sponsor. Though Indigenous community members independently supported the project, local Indigenous organizations did not, nor did she trust them as sponsors. In May 2003, while speaking at a diversity workshop, she met Ginette Lafrenière, an assistant professor of social work at Wilfrid Laurier University. Lafrenière invited her to the university to discuss the draft, and they met many times to copyedit it and find a sponsor. Lafrenière suggested her partner Lamine Diallo, the executive director for Social Planning Council of Cambridge and North Dumfries. He successfully argued to his board to sponsor the project. The AHF approved a $400,000 grant in 2003. Lafrenière lamented that after a year of contract negotiations, Dubie only met an AHF representative in April 2004 on a trip to Ottawa.

H7G opened on April 29, 2004. It served Indigenous peoples who attended residential schools or suffer from their effects by offering support groups, therapy, educational workshops, and purifying rituals such as talking circles, sweat lodges, and medicine walks. It initially served a pilot group of 15 members but it had a large demand and grew to over 100 members by 2005. It sometimes worked with non-Indigenous clients; by then, it had received referrals from the Waterloo Regional Police Service. H7G maintained a close relationship with Laurier. Over time, Dubie became a resource person for the Faculty of Social Work and was invited to speak in classes. As well, Diallo joined H7G's board of directors, and some social work students became volunteers. Laurier created a documentary about the organization and in the process found videographers and artists interested in forming an Indigenous theatre group. Lafrenière received concern from colleagues about the difficult and unpaid work of developing an organization with uncertain funding. She has argued that the pressure for scholars to publish has devalued important work and that developing H7G qualifies as such. Lafrenière describes the collaboration as mutually beneficial engaged scholarship. She said her philosophy was to help only when asked so that social work is done alongside and not for Indigenous communities. She stated upfront her inexperience with residential school trauma or sexual abuse, but also her desire to help with funding, research, and data collection.

By February 2005, H7G was offering workshops with the local organization Four Directions Aboriginal Restorative Justice on parenting skills and designing regalia for powwow dancing. Lafrenière had also helped the founder of Four Directions, Lou Henry, with his proposal. That month, Dubie and Henry invited all of the region's Indigenous organizations to a conference at Laurier titled "Taking Back Our Responsibility". Around 75 people attended, including community members and students. Discussion topics were the objectives of each organization, creating alliances with mainstream organizations, and challenges with helping Indigenous clients. Lafrenière later reported progress in rallying local Indigenous organizations around shared goals. In December 2005, nine members graduated from a healing program that lasted 36 weeks. They received certificates and gave speeches about finding pride and community. Many had been alcoholics or abused. A woman whose parents fought and whose grandfather sexually abused her first entered H7G distraught. A man was taught by his grandmother that Indigenous traditions were sinful. The program involved talking circles and individual and group workshops. Members learned about Indigenous medicine and smudging, the spiritual ceremony of burning white sage.

By 2007, membership had tripled Dubie's expectations. In 2009, Dubie asked Lafrenière for help funding a canoe-building project. Lafrenière and her students wrote a proposal to United Way and had many discussions with them to try to convince them that the project was culturally important. After a few months, United Way granted $2,000 to her research group, which she gave to the elders leading construction. A Mennonite farmer offered the land and birch bark for the project. Construction lasted three months and involved dozens of men and women of different peoples, including Cree, Dene, Ojibwe, and Mohawk. Elders shared teachings with urban youth, and people told stories about their lives and cultures. They tested the canoe on the Grand River then gifted it to the city to be displayed in the Kitchener City Hall. During a ceremony, members sat around a drum and sang Ojibwe songs, and Dubie told the mayor Carl Zehr that the canoe symbolized friendship with the city. Lafrenière thought the project showed that engaged scholarship does not require extensive funding or involvement to be beneficial.

=== Independence ===
Over time, H7G concentrated more on youth and restorative justice. After the canoe project, the organization became more financially stable and collaborated less with Lafrenière. Still, H7G's men's drum circle performed at a local conference about university and community collaboration. Between 2010 and 2012, the Ontario Trillium Foundation granted $130,000 to H7G to pay service providers working with their clients. H7G planned to use it for healing retreats with school boards and counselling organiations. In 2012, H7G's program coordinator began collecting and fundraising school supplies and shoes for children, particularly Indigenous children in low-income households. They worked with a donation centre and the Waterloo Catholic District School Board and stored the supplies at the Indigenous organization Anishnabeg Outreach. H7G held weekly healing circles at the Grand Valley Institution for Women in Kitchener in 2013; Abigail Bimman of CTV News reported then that nearly half of inmates were Indigenous. Inmates were escorted by prison staff to join, though most were from other provinces and less familiar with Ontarian traditions. In 2014, the Ontario Trillium Foundation granted a further $58,000 to run teaching circles.

H7G made their school supplies and shoes initiative recurring. They sent supplies to around 300 students yearly. Items such as magnifying glasses or headphones could be requested. Every two years, the organization has held a canoe paddling event. In 2018, 60 canoes travelled the Grand River from West Montrose to Kitchener, each with an Indigenous person and a justice worker. After, they held a barbecue and drumming. The event intended to break assumptions between both communities. On one trip, an Indigenous university student described her mother being sent to Waterloo Region during the Sixties Scoop, and an officer told her about learning the history of residential schools from his son. In 2018, H7G worked with arts organizations to create an eight-month youth program. Participants attended workshops about video, photography, programming, publishing, and printmaking. After being given a tour of ten local Indigenous sites by elders, they made an online and print guide. H7G also used Minjimendan, an Indigenous garden in Cambridge, for programming.

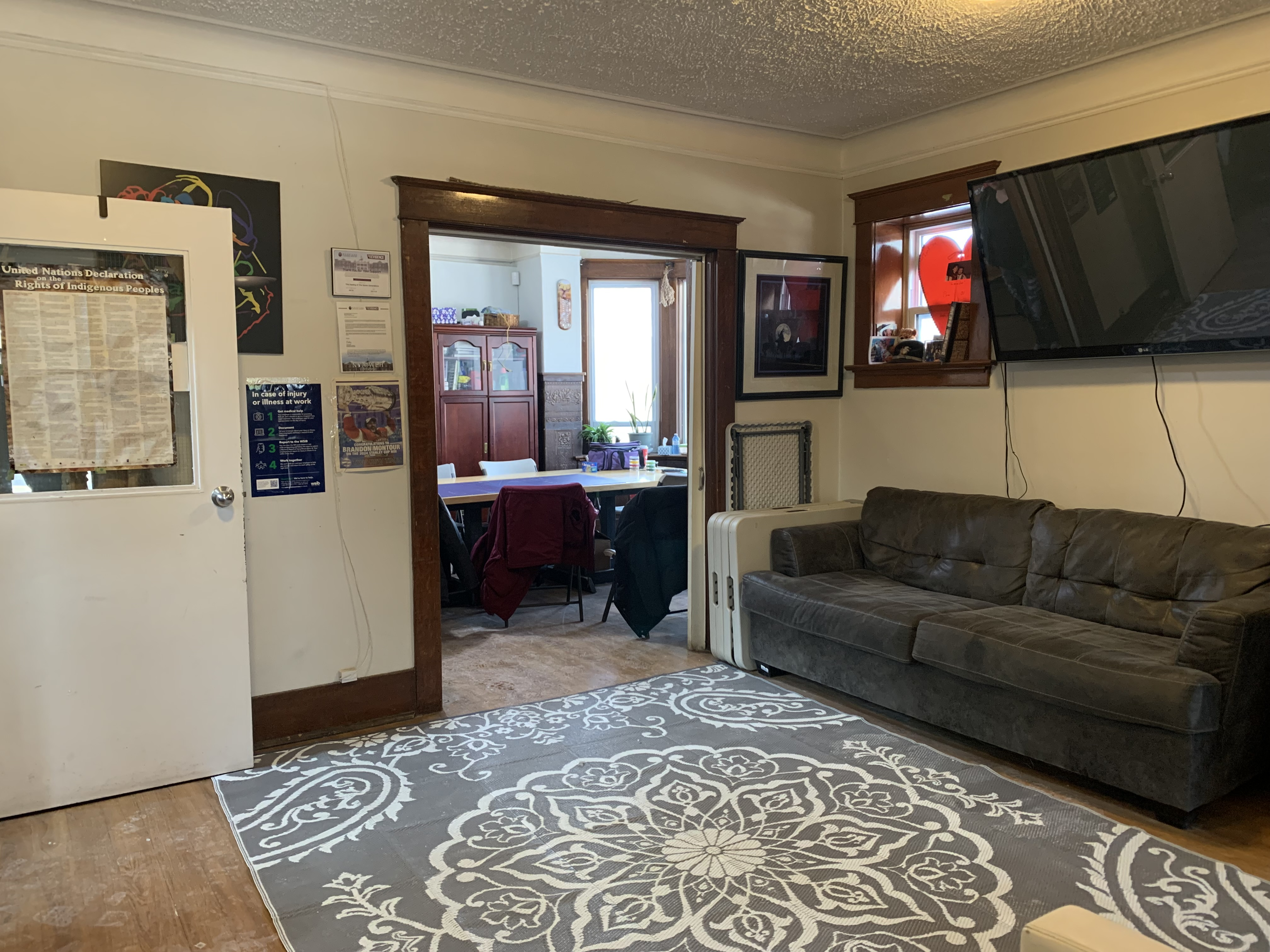
The interior in 2026

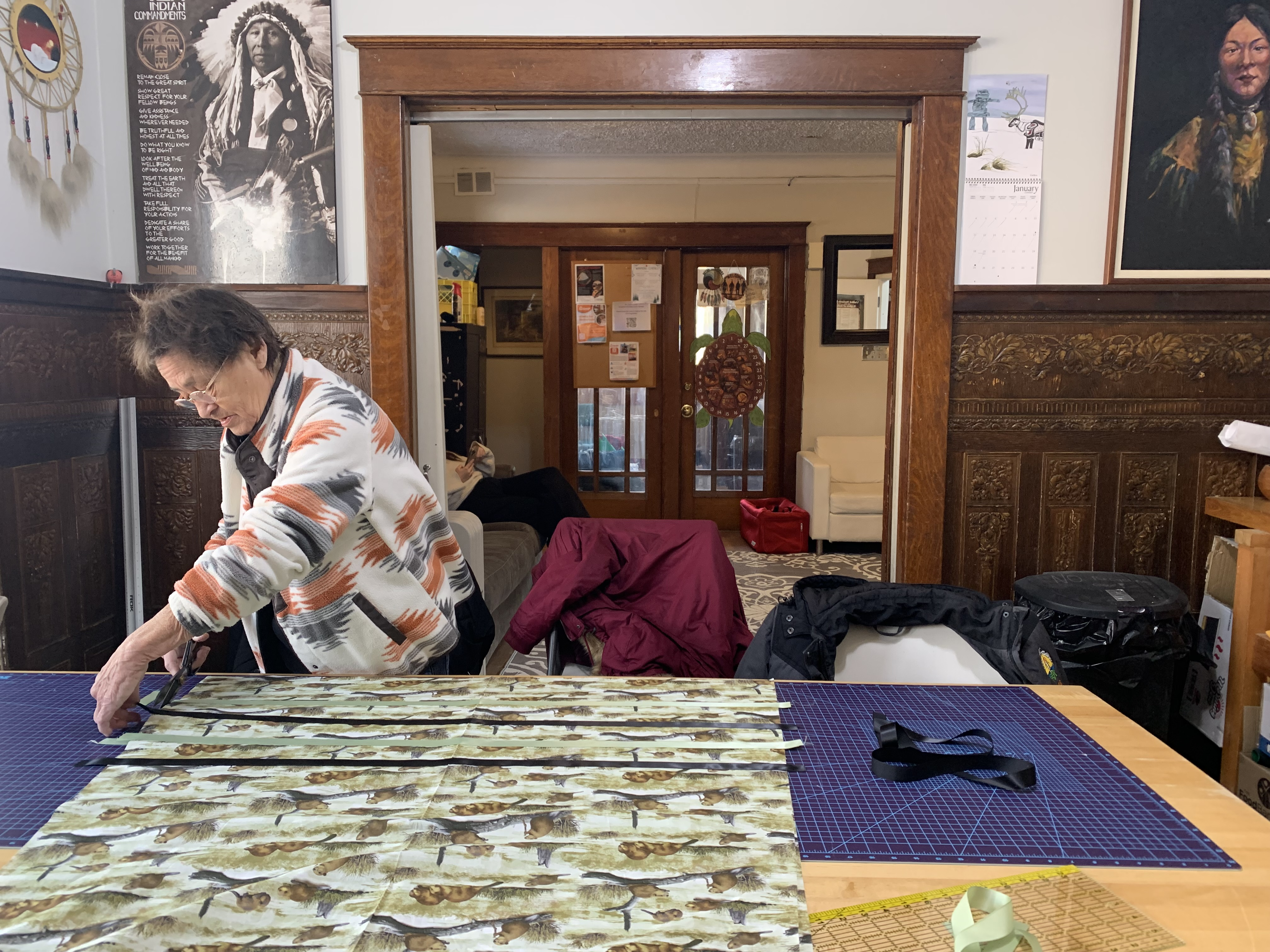
H7G's senior coordinator designing a ribbon skirt in 2026

In March 2021, during the COVID-19 pandemic, H7G opened two pop-up Indigenous vaccine clinics to overcome vaccine hesitancy, which Dubie said was based on medical experimentation by the government. Elders and drumming were present at the second clinic, which had 150 people registered for the first day. In May, after the detection of 215 unmarked graves at the Kamloops Indian Residential School, the organization displayed a memorial with teddy bears and children's shoes. Next month, 751 unmarked graves were detected at the Marieval Indian Residential School, and they lit a fire for prayer and tobacco burning, which was put out a week later on Canada Day. As of 2021, H7G offered 25 programs, including delivering food hampers. The organization holds weekly healing circles for women as of 2023.

Since the National Day for Truth and Reconciliation was recognized as a national holiday in 2021, H7G has observed it with community walks. The route begins on Frederick Street and ends in Victoria Park. Each year has had hundreds of participants, many of them non-Indigenous. In 2021, there was a crowd of over 1,000 people including mayors, city councillors, and the police chief. The walk has ended with drumming, smudging, and dancing. In 2023 and 2024, it was accompanied by a Grand River Transit bus wrapped in Indigenous art. In 2025, two orange police cars led the walk instead of the bus. Dubie said it was part of a process of creating a working relationship with the police force. Every year, H7G sells orange shirts, often for fundraisers, and encourages participants to wear them. They sold 6,000 shirts in 2021. Between that year and 2022, they donated $127,000 to the Woodland Cultural Centre, the interpretive centre in the Mohawk Institute. The organization has held similar walks for Red Dress Day. H7G displays have faced vandalism. A shirt ziptied to a post was stolen before Red Dress Day in 2024, and 20 crosses in a memorial for unmarked graves were torn from the ground before the National Day Truth and Reconciliation in 2025; police investigated both incidents.

== Works cited ==
- "$1M in Grants to Grow Good Works". Waterloo Region Record. March 31, 2014. p. B2 – via Newspapers.com.
- "Canoe a Symbol of Peace: Gift from First Nations Group Will Be Displayed at Kitchener City Hall". Waterloo Region Record. November 28, 2009. pp. B1, B7 – via Newspapers.com.
- "Over $3M in Federal Funding Going Towards 64 Local Organizations". CityNews Kitchener. August 23, 2023. Archived from the original on December 31, 2025.
- "Red T-Shirt Stolen from Healing of the Seven Generations Display Ahead of Red Dress Day". CBC News. May 3, 2024. Archived from the original on May 3, 2024.
- "Sacred Fire Lit in Kitchener for Lives Lost at Residential Schools". Waterloo Region Record. June 25, 2021.
- "School-Supply Backpack Drive for Indigenous Students Holds Fundraiser". CBC News. July 20, 2017. Archived from the original on July 21, 2017.
- Anderson, Erin (June 14, 2022). "Orange Shirts, Hoodie Stolen from Every Child Matters Display Outside the Healing of the Seven Generations". CityNews Kitchener. Archived from the original on December 31, 2025.
- Bacon, Ashley (May 5, 2025). "Waterloo Region Marks Red Dress Day with Ceremonies and Calls for Change". CTV News. Archived from the original on January 1, 2026.
- Bebee, David (May 13, 2011). "A Night in the Park". Waterloo Region Record. p. B3 – via Newspapers.com.
- Bimman, Abigail (April 4, 2013). "Prisoners Have Few Ways to Stay in Touch with Families, Outside World". CTV News. Archived from the original on December 31, 2025.
- Booth, Laura (August 30, 2018). "Shedding Light on Indigenous History: Art Program for Youth Will Highlight the History of First Peoples in Waterloo Region". Waterloo Region Record. p. A3 – via Newspapers.com.
- Chaarani, James (July 20, 2023). "36% of Inmates at Kitchener Women's Prison Are Indigenous — Advocate Says Education Could Curb Disparities". CBC News. Archived from the original on July 20, 2023.
- Clark, Christine; Goeree, Josh (February 22, 2024). "Every Child Matters Bus Wrap to Stay on GRT Bus Until End of September". CityNews Kitchener. Archived from the original on February 23, 2024.
- Clark, Christine (September 16, 2023). "H7G Once Again Selling Every Child Matters Shirts and Backpacks for Orange Shirt Day". CityNews Kitchener. Archived from the original on December 31, 2025.
- D'Amato, Luisa (July 19, 2017). "Back-to-School Gifts Make a Big Difference for Indigenous Students". Waterloo Region Record. p. B1 – via Newspapers.com.
- D'Amato, Luisa (August 17, 2018). "'We're Here': On a Canoe Trip, Indigenous People Start a Conversation". Waterloo Region Record. pp. A1, A2 – via Newspapers.com.
- D'Amato, Luisa (June 30, 2017). "'What Is There for My People to Celebrate?'". Waterloo Region Record. pp. A1, A12 – via Newspapers.com.
- Ferrier, Melanie (August 16, 2018). "Paddlers Take to the Grand in the Name of Reconciliation". CBC News. Archived from the original on August 16, 2018.
- Groleau, Carmen (September 30, 2025). "Hundreds Gather in Downtown Kitchener to Mark National Day for Truth and Reconciliation". CBC News. Archived from the original on September 30, 2025.
- Groleau, Carmen (November 14, 2018). "Indigenous Foods Garden in Cambridge Sees Growth". CBC News. Archived from the original on November 15, 2018.
- Hill, Valerie (July 6, 2012). "Program Gathers Shoes for Aboriginal Children: Back-to-School Initiative Aims to Help Local Needy Families". Waterloo Region Record. p. E3 – via Newspapers.com.
- Jackson, Bill (December 7, 2024). "Region's First Indigenous-Led Child Care Centre to Open in Cambridge". Waterloo Region Record.
- Kawawada, Karen (February 15, 2005). "Justice System Offers Healing: Program Gives Aboriginals Hope". Waterloo Region Record. pp. A1, A4 – via Newspapers.com.
- Lafrenière, Ginette; Diallo, Lamine; Dubie, Donna (2007). "Building Bridges Between Academe and Community: Case Study of the Healing of the Seven Generations Project". Native Social Work Journal. 6: 121–136. S2CID 109549103.
- Lafrenière, Ginette; Diallo, Lamine; Dubie, Donna; Henry, Lou (2005). "Can University/Community Collaboration Create Spaces for Aboriginal Reconciliation? Case Study of the Healing of the Seven Generations and Four Directions Community Projects and Wilfrid Laurier University". First Peoples Child & Family Review. 2 (1): 53–66. doi:10.7202/1069538ar. OCLC 8606062465. S2CID 142037209.
- Lafrenière, Ginette; Diallo, Lamine; Dubie, Donna (2005). "Dancing with Turtles: Building Alliances Between Communities and the Academy". In Karumanchery, Leeno (ed.). Engaging Equity: New Perspectives on Anti-Racist Education. Detsellig Enterprises. pp. 163–177. ISBN 978-1-55059-286-3.
- Lafrenière, Ginette (2016). "University–Community Collaboration with Urban Aboriginal Peoples Case Study of the Healing of the Seven Generations Canoe Project". In Blum, Alan; Murray, Stuart J. (eds.). The Ethics of Care: Moral Knowledge, Communication, and the Art of Caregiving. Routledge. pp. 109–118. ISBN 978-1-317-03384-4.
- Ma, Germain (September 30, 2022). "Orange Shirts Fill Downtown Kitchener on National Day for Truth and Reconciliation". CityNews Kitchener. Archived from the original on December 31, 2025.
- McGinty, Joe (September 29, 2025). "'It's Heartbreaking,' Crosses Ripped from the Ground in Victoria Park Ahead of Truth and Reconciliation Ceremony". Waterloo Region Record.
- Monteiro, Liz (December 3, 2005). "Healing Circle Eases Legacy of Residential School Abuses: Program Reintroduces Local Natives to the Culture of Their Ancestors". Waterloo Region Record. pp. B1, B6 – via Newspapers.com.
- Monteiro, Liz (April 8, 2010). "Local First Nations Agency Gets Grant". Waterloo Region Record. p. B1 – via Newspapers.com.
- Monteiro, Liz (July 3, 2010). "Woman Finds Salvation in the Native Traditions of Her Ancestors". Waterloo Region Record. p. B7 – via Newspapers.com.
- Pace, Taylor (October 23, 2021). "Healing Seven Generations of Residential School Trauma". CityNews Kitchener. Archived from the original on December 31, 2025.
- Rubinoff, Joel (October 2, 2023). "Walk an 'Educational Opportunity': Every Child Matters Initiative Exuberant, Triumphant — with Undertone of Sadness". Waterloo Region Record. p. A3 – via Newspapers.com.
- Schmidt, Hannah (September 30, 2024). "Waterloo Region Commemorates National Day for Truth and Reconciliation". CTV News. Archived from the original on June 24, 2025.
- Shetty, Aastha (June 25, 2021). "Sacred Fire Will Burn for Seven Days to Honour Indigenous Lives Lost at Canada's Residential Schools". CityNews Kitchener. Archived from the original on January 1, 2026.
- Tignanelli, Vanessa (September 23, 2017). "'How Are You Healing?' What Moving Forward Looks like for Indigenous Women". Waterloo Region Record.
- Versolatto, Tegan (March 24, 2021). "Waterloo Region Opens Second Indigenous Vaccine Clinic". CTV News. Archived from the original on January 1, 2026.
- Villella, Stephanie (October 20, 2021). "Healing of the Seven Generations Donates $84K to the Woodland Cultural Centre". CTV News. Archived from the original on December 31, 2025.
- Williams, Robert (September 30, 2021). "'This Is a Day to Remember, but It's Also a Beginning'". Waterloo Region Record.
