= Aboriginal Healing Foundation =

Canadian non-profit corporation

- Formation: March 30, 1998
- Dissolved: September 30, 2014; 12 years ago
- Legal status: not-for-profit, private corporation
- Headquarters: Ottawa, Ontario
- Executive Director: Mike DeGagne

The Aboriginal Healing Foundation was established in 1998 as an Indigenous managed, non-profit corporation dedicated to responding to the legacy of residential schools in Canada and the associated community health impacts. Funding for the Aboriginal Healing Foundation ceased in 2014.

== History ==
The Aboriginal Healing Foundation was created on March 30, 1998. It was established following consultations with residential school survivors, the Assembly of First Nations, the Inuit Tapirisat of Canada, the Congress of Aboriginal Peoples, the Métis National Council, and the Native Women's Association of Canada. The mission of the Aboriginal Healing Foundation was to foster sustainable healing strategies in Indigenous communities in Canada that begin to address the impacts of the residential school system. The Foundation was initially provided with $350 million of funding from the Canadian government to carry out this work with residential school survivors and Indigenous communities across Canada. The Foundation was designed as an organization to be responsible for the management of the Canada government's healing strategy related to residential schools. This strategy was part of the "Gathering Strength, Canada's Aboriginal Action Plan" established by the federal government on January 7, 1998. The original mandate of the Foundation was set to end on March 31, 2009.

The first chair of the Foundation was Georges Erasmus. The original board of directors was composed of 17 people, including Garnet Angeconeb, Charlene Belleau, Jerome Berthelette, Paul Chartrand, Angus Cockney, Ken Courchene, Wendy John, Richard Kistabish, Cerrielynn Lamouche, Ann Meekitjuk-Hanson, Teressa Nahanee, Dorris Peters, Viola Robinson, Grant Severight, Cindy Swanson, and Charles Weaselhead.

In 2005 the Aboriginal Healing Foundation was granted an additional $40 million through the 2005 federal budget.

The Indian Residential Schools Settlement Agreement of 2007 resulted in an additional $125 million of funding for the Healing Foundation and a prolonged mandate for the organization. Part of this funding was through the federal government. Additionally under the settlement agreement the 50 Roman Catholic Church entities associated with the settlement agreement were required to pay $29 million to the Aboriginal Healing Foundation which would be used for community healing programs. There has been debate about the Church's obligations to pay this amount and in 2013 the Canadian government pursued legal action for $1.6 million that the Catholic entities had not paid the Foundation.

Throughout its operation the Foundation received $515 million from the Government of Canada. The Foundation also generated $537,146,681 in interest on this funding which was further used to fund community projects. In 2010 funding for the Aboriginal Healing Foundation was cut by Stephen Harper's conservative government. This cut in funding resulted in the closure of the Foundation in 2014. It also resulted in the discontinuation of funding to many community based healing initiatives and the closure of many healing programs regionally in Canada. Following the closure of the Aboriginal Healing Foundation its research library, records, and archives were donated to the Shingwauk Residential Schools Centre at Algoma University.

== Funded Community Projects ==
The first funding cycle of the Foundation operated in the form of a call for proposals that was sent out on December 3, 1998. The call was open to communities and survivor groups and focused on three thematic areas of programming: 1) Developing and Enhancing Aboriginal Capacity and Community Therapeutic Healing; 2) Healing Centers; 3) Restoring Balance, Honour, and History. This first batch of funding resulted in $19.4 million being awarded to projects across Canada. Funded community groups included:

- Yukon
  - Kwalin Dun First Nations Health Program
  - Carcoss/Tagish First Nation
- Northwest Territories
  - Tl'oodih Healing Society
  - Hamlet of Cape Dorset
  - Dene Cultural Institute
- British Columbia
  - Gitksan & Wet'suwet'en Residential School Committee
  - Chawathil First Nations
  - Sulsilalelum Healing Centre Society
  - Kitamaat Village Council
  - Tsleil-Waututh Nation
  - Prince George Native Friendship Centre Society
  - Nuu-chah-nulth Tribal Council Community & Human Services
  - Squamish Nation 'Na Nichimstm Tina Tkwekin
  - Urban Native Youth Association
  - Healing Our Spirit BC First Nations AIDS Society
  - Lower Similkameen Indian Band
  - Nuxalk Nation
  - Tsawataineuk Band Council
  - Lax Kw'alaams Indian Band Family Counselling Centre
  - Chawathil First Nations
- Alberta
  - Paddle Prairie Métis Settlement
  - Sturgeon Lake Cree Nation Health Service
  - Alexis Health Department
  - Saddle Lake Health Care Centre
  - Loon River First Nation #47
  - Kainaiwa Board of Education - Aakssokinaapiossiwa
  - Blood Tribe Human Resource Management Department
- Saskatchewan
  - Kaneweyimik Child & Family Services Inc
  - Ile-A-la-Crosse Friendship Centre
  - Yorkton Tribal Administration Inc.
  - Prince Albert Associated Counselling & Mediation Services
  - Beardy's and Okemasis First Nation
  - Community Renewing Spirits - Muskowpetung First Nation
  - Building a Nation Life Skills Training Inc
  - Prince Albert Associated Counseling & Mediation Services
  - Cote First Nation
  - Prince Albert Grand Council Health & Social Development
  - Agency Chiefs Tribal Council
  - Pasqua First Nation #79
- Manitoba
  - Ma Mawi Wi Chi Itata Centre
  - Sandy Bay Health Centre
- Quebec
  - Onkw'takaritahtsheraa Healing the Family Circle
  - Conseil des Montagnais de Natashquan
  - Chiiwaschaauwiin -- Chisasibi Circle of Women
  - Nemaska First Nation of James Bay
  - Conseil de la nation atikamekw inc
  - Council of the Cree Nation of Mistissini
- Nova Scotia
  - Eskasoni Mental Health & Social Work
  - Wagmatcook First Nation and Waycobah First Nation
  - Membertou Band Council
- Ontario
  - Native Child and Family Services of Toronto
  - UCCM Mnaamodzawin Health Services
  - Georgian Bay Native Friendship Centre
  - Giizhgaandag Gamig Healing Lodge Inc.
  - Mnjikaning First Nation
  - Naandwedidaa "Let's Heal One Another" Program
  - Aboriginal Women's Support Centre
  - Big Grassy First Nation
  - Nimishomosis -- Mokomis Healing Group
  - Whitewater Lake Community Development Corporation
  - Algonquins of Pikwàkanagàn First Nation
  - Chapleau Cree First Nation
  - Wabano Centre for Aboriginal Health
  - Children of Shingwauk Alumni Council
  - Chippewas of Nawash
  - Constance Lake First Nation
  - Healing of the Seven Generations
  - Ojibways of the Pic River First Nation
  - Wapole Island First Nation Council
  - Wabaseemoong Independent Nations
- New Brunswick
  - Metepenagiag First Nation
  - St. Mary's First Nation Healing Program
  - Eel Ground Community Development Centre Inc

=== Funding Evaluation ===
During its operation the Aboriginal Healing Foundation funded over 1,500 community based healing initiatives. The Foundation was subject to government funding audits and the Foundation also conducted community based program evaluations of the initiatives which received funding. The 2009 Indian and Northern Affairs Canada (INAC) evaluation of the Foundation programming reviewed the administration files of Foundation funded projects; conducted staff and subject expert interviews; and conducted community case studies which included interviews with healing project participants. The evaluation found the Foundation had been very successful in administering funding and contributing to community healing but that there was still much ongoing work in communities to be done. INAC also indicated that there was a strong need for community based healing initiatives to continue and recommended continued funding of the Foundation.

== Research Mandate ==
In addition to funding community based healing initiatives the Aboriginal Healing Foundation had a research mandate that was dedicated to creating a knowledge base relating to the long term community and health impacts of residential schools. This research mandate was outlined in the 1998 agreement that the Foundation signed with the Government of Canada and resulted in the Foundation seeking out researchers, scholars, and authors to write publications on residential schools, reconciliation, health, and other issues.

The first research director of the Aboriginal Healing Foundation was Gail Guthrie Valaskakis (2000-2007). Following the death of Valaskakis in 2007, Jonathan Dewar served as research director from 2007 to 2012. As a result of the work of research branch of the organization published numerous books, including:

- Hylton, John H. (2002). Aboriginal Sexual Offending in Canada (PDF). The Aboriginal Healing Foundation Research Series (1st ed.). Ottawa: Aboriginal Healing Foundation. ISBN 1-897285-33-7.
- Dumont-Smith, Claudette (2002). Aboriginal Elder Abuse in Canada (PDF). Ottawa: Aboriginal Healing Foundation.
- Corrado, Raymond R.; Cohen, Irwin M. (2003). Mental Health Profiles for a Sample of British Columbia's Aboriginal Survivors of the Canadian Residential School System (PDF). The Aboriginal Healing Foundation Research Series. Ottawa: Aboriginal Healing Foundation. ISBN 0-9733431-3-3.
- Tait, Caroline L. (2003). Fetal Alcohol Syndrome Among Aboriginal People in Canada: Review and Analysis of the Intergenerational Links to Residential Schools (PDF). The Aboriginal Healing Foundation Research Series. Ottawa: Aboriginal Healing Foundation. ISBN 0-9732763-8-X.
- Dion Stout, Madeleine; Kipling, Gregory (2003). Aboriginal People, Resilience and the Residential School Legacy (PDF). The Aboriginal Healing Foundation Research Series. Ottawa: Aboriginal Healing Foundation. ISBN 0-9733976-5-9.
- Bopp, Michael; Bopp, Judie (2003). Aboriginal Domestic Violence in Canada (PDF). The Aboriginal Healing Foundation Research Series. Ottawa: Aboriginal Healing Foundation. ISBN 0-9733976-0-8.
- Wesley-Esquimaux, Cynthia; Smolewski, Magdalena (2004). Historic Trauma and Aboriginal Healing (PDF). The Aboriginal Healing Foundation Research Series. Ottawa: Aboriginal Healing Foundation. ISBN 0-9733976-9-1.
- Mussell, W.J. (Bill) (2005). WARRIOR-CAREGIVERS: Understanding the Challenges and Healing of First Nations Men (PDF). Ottawa: Aboriginal Healing Foundation. ISBN 1-897285-20-5.
- Chansonneuve, Deborah (2005). Reclaiming Connections: Understanding Residential School Trauma Among Aboriginal People (PDF). Ottawa: Aboriginal Healing Foundation. ISBN 0-9736647-3-8.
- Archibald, Linda (2006). Decolonization and Healing: Indigenous Experiences in the United States, New Zealand, Australia and Greenland (PDF). The Aboriginal Healing Foundation Research Series. Ottawa: Aboriginal Healing Foundation. ISBN 1-897285-10-8.
- King, David (2006). A Brief Report of The Federal Government of Canada's Residential School System for Inuit (PDF). Ottawa: Aboriginal Healing Foundation. ISBN 1-897285-27-2.
- Chartrand, Larry N.; Logan, Tricia E.; Daniels, Judy D. (2006). Métis History and Experience and Residential Schools in Canada (PDF). The Aboriginal Healing Foundation Research Series. Ottawa: Aboriginal Healing Foundation. ISBN 1-897285-35-3.
- Chansonneuve, Deborah (2007). Addictive Behaviours Among Aboriginal People in Canada (PDF). Ottawa: Aboriginal Healing Foundation. ISBN 978-1-897285-47-3.
- Dion Stout, Madeleine; Harp, Rick (2007). Lump Sum Compensation Payments Research Project: The Circle Rechecks Itself (PDF). Aboriginal Healing Foundation Research Series. Ottawa: Aboriginal Healing Foundation. ISBN 978-1-897285-55-8.
- Kirmayer, Laurence J.; Brass, Gregory; Holton, Tara; Paul, Ken (2007). Suicide Among Aboriginal People in Canada (PDF). The Aboriginal Healing Foundation Research Series. Ottawa: Aboriginal Healing Foundation. ISBN 978-1-897285-51-0.
- Waldram, James B., ed. (2008). Aboriginal Healing in Canada: Studies in Therapeutic Meaning and Practice (PDF). The Aboriginal Healing Foundation Research Series. Ottawa: Aboriginal Healing Foundation. ISBN 978-1-897285-65-7.
- Brant Castellano, Marlene; Archibald, Linda; DeGagné, Mike (2008). From Truth to Reconciliation Transforming the Legacy of Residential Schools (PDF). The Aboriginal Healing Foundation Research Series. Ottawa: Aboriginal Healing Foundation. ISBN 978-1-897285-61-9.
- Younging, Gregory; Dewar, Jonathan; DeGagné, Mike, eds. (2009). Response, Responsibility, and Renewal Canada's Truth and Reconciliation Journey (PDF). Aboriginal Healing Foundation Research Series. Ottawa: Aboriginal Healing Foundation. ISBN 978-1-897285-73-2.
- Barlow, J. Kevin (2009). Residential Schools, Prisons, and HIV/AIDS among Aboriginal People in Canada: Exploring the Connections (PDF). The Aboriginal Healing Foundation Research Series. Ottawa: Aboriginal Healing Foundation. ISBN 978-1-897285-80-0.
- Reimer, Gwen (2010). The Indian Residential Schools Settlement Agreement's Common Experience Payment and Healing: A Qualitative Study Exploring Impacts on Recipients (PDF). The Aboriginal Healing Foundation Research Series. Ottawa: Aboriginal Healing Foundation. ISBN 978-1-897285-89-3.
- A Compendium of Aboriginal Healing Foundation Research (PDF). The Aboriginal Healing Foundation Research Series. Ottawa: Aboriginal Healing Foundation. 2010.
- Mathur, Ashok; Dewar, Jonathan; DeGagné, Mike, eds. (2011). Cultivating Canada : reconciliation through the lens of cultural diversity. The Aboriginal Healing Foundation Research Series. Ottawa: Aboriginal Healing Foundation. ISBN 9781897285985.
- Bombay, Amy; Matheson, Kim; Anisman, Hymie (2014). Origins of Lateral Violence In Aboriginal Communities: A Preliminary Study of Student-To-Student Abuse in Residential Schools (PDF). Ottawa: Aboriginal Healing Foundation. ISBN 978-1-77215-002-5.
- Spear, Wayne K (2014). Full Circle: The Aboriginal Healing Foundation and The Unfinished Work of Hope, Healing And Reconciliation (PDF). Ottawa: Aboriginal Healing Foundation. ISBN 978-1-77215-004-9.

In addition to the publication of books the Aboriginal Healing Foundation maintained a research library. Named after the first research director of the Aboriginal Healing Foundation, the Gail Guthrie Valaskakis Memorial Resource Library is a special collections library focused on residential schools, healing, reconciliation, and Indigenous people. The library contains over 6,000 unique items including video, books, research materials, and project reports. The contents of the library was donated to the Shingwauk Residential Schools Centre in 2011 following the announcement of funding cuts to the Foundation.

== See also ==
- Canadian Indian residential school system
- Truth and Reconciliation Commission (Canada)
- First Nations
