= James (Sákéj) Youngblood Henderson =

American university administrator from Saskatchewan, Canada (born 1944)

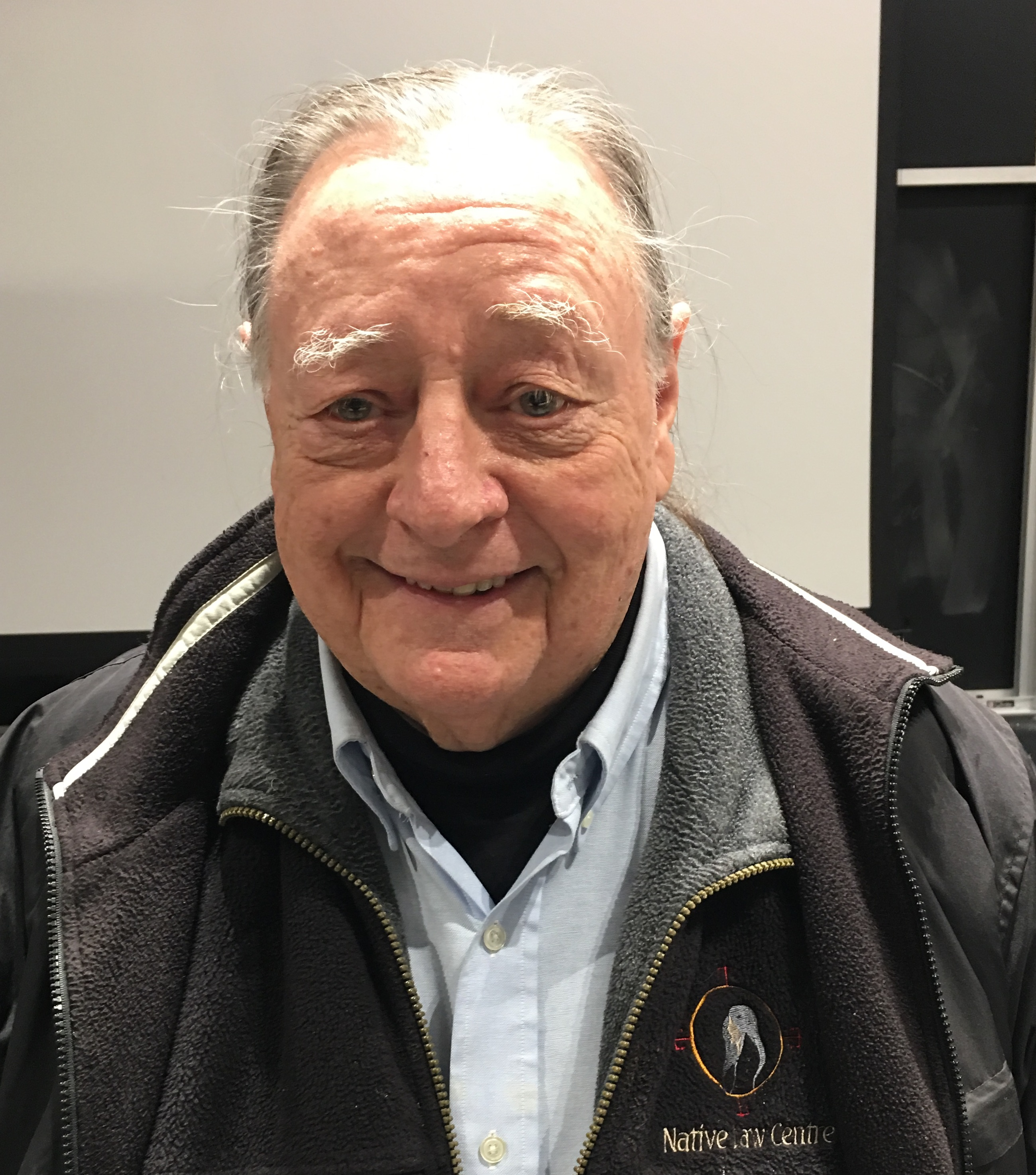
- Professor James (Sákéj) Youngblood Henderson in January 2017
- Born: James Youngblood Henderson; December 20, 1944 (age 81); Ardmore, Oklahoma, U.S.
- Citizenship: American
- Spouse: Marie Battiste

Academic background
- Education: Harvard Law School (Juris doctor)

Academic work
- Discipline: Indigenous law

James (Sakej) Youngblood Henderson (born December 20, 1944) is an American human rights lawyer, advocate, and educator.

== Background ==
James Youngblood Henderson was born on December 20, 1944, in Ardmore, Oklahoma. He has stated that he has Chickasaw ancestry through his paternal grandfather, and he also stated that he has Cheyenne ancestry. He experienced poverty while growing up, which prompted him to make ending poverty for all Indigenous peoples a life goal.

== Education ==
As an undergraduate student, he served as the vice-president of the American National Indian Youth Council, which prompted him to look at the Civil Rights Movement as a model for a potential Indigenous rights movement. He attended Harvard Law School, where in 1974 he became one of the first Native Americans to be awarded the Juris Doctor.

He married Mi'kmaq educator Marie Battiste and is the father of Canadian MP Jaime Battiste.

== Work ==
In his first year out of Harvard Law School, Henderson completed his first major case, in which he reestablished for his father's clan several legal rights. Since then, Henderson has worked to protect Indigenous heritage and culture through legal means, working with the Canadian government, the Mi'kmaq Nation, the United Nations, and other First Nation governments. Additionally, he has taught law at Stanford University, Berkeley, Harvard University, and other North American law schools throughout his career. Henderson was brought to Canada in 1978 when his wife, Marie Battiste, was asked by the Grand Captain of the Mi'kmaq people to set up a bilingual education program in Nova Scotia. He then began working with the Mi'kmaw Nation on drafting their land titles and representing them in their legal proceedings. Between 1978 and 1983, Henderson worked with the Mi'kmaq Nation and the Assembly of First Nations as a constitutional advisor and continued working with these groups through the constitutional process in Canada through 1993. His expertise in Indigenous legal issues lead Henderson to serve on the advisory board of the Canadian Minister of Foreign Affairs, as a member of the Sectoral Commission on Culture, Communication, and Information of the Canadian Commission for UNESCO between 2000 and 2010, and as a member of the Experts Advisory Group on International Cultural Diversity. Additionally, Henderson worked to protect Indigenous Nations' rights during the Kelowna Accord, and through the Four Directions Council, a United Nations Non-Governmental Organization. Throughout his career, he has helped draft and author many legal documents and other works which protect Indigenous heritage, culture, and legal rights, including the UN Declaration on the Rights of Indigenous Peoples. He wrote many books, articles, and other writings on Indigenous law.

Henderson works in Canada as the Research Director of the Native Law Centre and as a professor of Indigenous law at the University of Saskatchewan College of Law.

== Awards and honors ==
Henderson has received several awards and honors for his proficiency in international law and his dedication to pursuing justice for Indigenous peoples, including an Indigenous People's Council award in 2005, a National Aboriginal Achievement Award, now the Indspire Award, for Law and Justice in 2006, and an Honorary Doctorate of Law from Carleton University in 2007. In addition, he was named a Fellow of the Royal Society of Canada in 2013.

== Selected publications ==
- Indian Statehood Reconsidered (1974)
- Tribal Administration of Natural Resource Development (1975) with Russel Lawrence Barsh
- The Road: Indian Tribes and Political Liberty (1982) with Russel Lawrence Barsh
- Mikmaq State Papers (1984) with Mik'maq Indians, Russel Lawrence Barsh, and Bernie Francis
- First Nations' Legal Inheritance (1991)
- The Míkmaw Concordat (1997)
- Aboriginal Tenure in the Constitution of Canada (2000) with Marjorie Lynne Benson and Isobel Findlay
- Aboriginal Jurisprudences Protects Aboriginal Heritages (2002)
- Treaty Rights in the Constitution of Canada (2007)
