= Terry Felix =

Canadian retired soccer player

Personal information
- Date of birth: 9 September 1959 (age 67)
- Place of birth: Matsqui, British Columbia, Canada
- Position: Forward

Youth career
- Sasquatch Inn SC

Senior career*
Years	Team	Apps	(Gls)
1983	Vancouver Whitecaps	8	(2)

International career
1983	Canadian Olympic Team	2	(2)
1983	Canada	3	(0)
- * Club domestic league appearances and goals

Terry Felix (born 5 September 1959) is a Canadian retired soccer player who earned three caps for the national team in 1983. He played club soccer for the Vancouver Whitecaps competing in the North American Soccer League (NASL).

He was the first indigenous player to play professionally in North America, and the first to represent Canada.

== Early life ==
Felix was born in Matsqui, British Columbia. His father Peter was born on the Chehalis Indian Reserve in Agassiz and his mother Dolores was born on the Katzie Indian Reserve near Vancouver; Felix himself was raised on the Sts'ailes First Nation Indian Reservation. He began playing soccer at the age of six.

== Club career ==
At the age of 16 Felix joined Sasquatch Inn SC.

On 10 July 1983 Felix made his professional debut for the Vancouver Whitecaps in front of 50,000 fans in a match against the New York Cosmos. In doing so he became the first indigenous soccer player to play professionally in North America. He made eight appearances in total that season, scoring two goals and making one assist. He retired after suffering a ligament injury.

== International career ==
He represented Canada in Olympic Qualifiers and made five international appearances in 1983 for the national senior team, including three caps. In doing so he became the first indigenous player to represent Canada.

== Later life ==
Felix married and had seven children, and worked full time on the Sts'ailes First Nation reserve, whilst also working as a prison counsellor. In 2022, he won the Indspire Award in the sports category.
