= Marie Battiste =

North American author and educator

- Born: 1949 (age 76–77); Houlton, Maine, U.S.
- Spouse: James (Sákéj) Youngblood Henderson
- Children: Jaime Battiste

Academic background
- Education: University of Maine at Farmington (BS); Harvard University (MEd); Stanford University (EdD)

Academic work
- Discipline: Education
- Sub-discipline: Miꞌkmaq language
- Institutions: University of Saskatchewan

Marie Ann Battiste (born 1949) is an American author and educator working as a professor at the University of Saskatchewan in the Department of Educational Foundations. Her research is focused on indigenous languages and knowledge systems.

== Early life and education ==
Battiste was born and raised in Houlton, Maine, the daughter of Miꞌkmaq parents John and Annie Battiste from the Potlotek First Nation in Nova Scotia. She attended Houlton High School, graduating in 1967. She earned a teaching certificate and Bachelor of Science degree in education from the University of Maine at Farmington in 1971. She went on to attend Harvard University, graduating in 1974 with a master of education in administration and social policy. In 1984, she earned a doctorate of education from Stanford University, specializing in curriculum and teacher education.

== Career ==
After graduating from the University of Maine in 1971, Battiste worked at the Maine Indian Education Council, where she introduced and developed an early childhood education program, Head Start, on three reservations and in multiple off-reservation communities. Battiste spent twenty-five years in Cape Breton, where she worked alongside James (Sákéj) Youngblood Henderson with young Mi'kmaq students. The work Battiste and Henderson did together grew the number of Mi'kmaq teachers from a few to sixty, and the addition of ten lawyers. Battiste has worked in the field of Indian education for over thirty years with her most well-known work being the revitalization of Mi'kmaq language in her home community in Chapel Island, Nova Scotia. She credits her doctoral dissertation as one of the many starting points interest in revitalizing the native language, saying that a conversation with her advisor about the multiple writing systems of the Mi'kmaq language inspired her to research the histories of these writing systems.

Battiste has taught a various schools in Nova Scotia, working as the education director and principal on the Chapel Island reserve from 1984 to 1988. She has served on various boards and as a delegate to the United Nations' Workshop on Indigenous Peoples and Higher Education.

== Awards and honours ==
Battiste was awarded Honorary Officer of the Order of Canada in 2019, and in 2008 she was one of 14 recipients of the National Aboriginal Achievement Award for her work in aboriginal education in Canada. Her list of honours also includes the 1985 Woman of the Year award from the Sydney, Nova Scotia Professional and Business Women's Society. In the same year, she received the Alumni Achievement award from the University of Maine Farmington.

Battiste is the recipient of two honorary doctorates, one from St. Mary's University in 1987, and the other from the University of Maine at Farmington in 1997. In 1992, she received the 125th Year Queen's Award for Service to the Community as well as the Nova Scotia Social Studies Curriculum Development Award. In 1993, Battiste was honoured with a White Eagle Feather at the Eskasoni School Pow Wow in Eskasoni, Nova Scotia, and again in 1995 was honoured by the Mi'kmaq Grand Council with an Eagle Feather on Mi'kmaq Treaty Day. Both Battiste and Henderson were recipients of the First Nations Publishing Award and the Saskatchewan Book Award in 2000 for Protecting Indigenous Knowledge, a book they wrote together. In 2013, she was awarded the Canadian Association of University Teachers Distinguished Academic Award.

== Personal life ==
Battiste is married to James (Sákéj) Youngblood Henderson. Their son, Jaime Battiste, is a member of the Parliament of Canada for the Cape Breton—Canso—Antigonish district.

== Books ==
- Reclaiming Indigenous Voice and Vision
- Protecting Indigenous Knowledge and Heritage: A Global Challenge
- First Nations Education in Canada: The Circle Unfolds
- Decolonizing Education: Nourishing the Learning Spirit
