= Gail Guthrie Valaskakis =

- Born: May 9, 1939; Lac du Flambeau
- Died: July 19, 2007 (aged 68); Ottawa, Ontario
- Education: Cornell University, McGill University
- Occupations: Academic, writer
- Writing career
- Notable awards: National Aboriginal Achievement Award

Gail Guthrie Valaskakis (1939-2007) was a media studies scholar who taught in the Department of Communication Studies at Concordia University, where she also served as Dean in the Faculty of Arts and Sciences (1992-1997). After leaving Concordia, Valaskakis served as director of research at the Aboriginal Healing Foundation in Ottawa.

== Personal life ==
Valaskakis was born on May 9, 1939, to Miriam Van Buskirk and Benedict Guthrie in Ashland, Wisconsin. She was raised on the Lac du Flambeau First Nation, Wisconsin to Chippewa and Dutch-American parents. As a child, Valaskakis attended a United States Indian school. She identified as an indigenous person throughout her life. She had two children, her sons Paris and Ion.

In 1961, Valaskakis graduated from the University of Wisconsin with a Bachelor of Science in Education, majoring in Speech and Drama with a minor in English. In 1961 she entered Cornell University under the Kappa Kappa Gamma Graduate Counselor Scholarship. She received her Master of Arts Degree in Theater Arts from Cornell University. Later, she completed her PhD dissertation entitled "A communicational analysis of Eskimo-Kabloona interaction patterns: Southern Baffin, Eastern Arctic" at McGill University in 1979.

Valaskakis died in Ottawa on July 19, 2007.

== Career ==
Valaskakis was one of the founders of Manitou College, the first Indigenous post-secondary institution in eastern Canada. She was also involved in the establishment of the Native Friendship Centre of Montreal and the Waseskun House.

Valaskakis worked at Concordia University from 1968 to 1998, primarily in the Department of Communication Studies. During her academic career at Concordia University, Valaskakis held numerous administrative positions including: Department of Communication Studies chair (1983-1985), Faculty of Arts and Science Vice-Dean (1985-1990), and Faculty of Arts and Science Dean (1992-1997). While at Concordia, Valaskakis was also responsible for the establishment of the Native Education Centre on campus and was involved in the establishment of the Inter-University Joint Doctoral Programme in Communications with the Université du Québec à Montréal and the Université de Montréal. She retired from Concordia in 1998.

In 2000, Valaskakis was hired as the research director of the Aboriginal Healing Foundation; she held this position until her death in 2007. Following her death the Aboriginal Healing Foundation research library was dedicated the "Gail Guthrie Valaskakis Memorial Resource Centre" in her memory, in 2011 the resource centre was donated to the Shingwauk Residential Schools Centre at Algoma University.

== Bibliography ==
- "The other side of empire: Contact and communication in Southern Baffin Island." in W. Melody, L. Salter, & P. Heyer (Eds.), Culture, communication and dependency: The tradition of H. A. Innis, 1981.
- New technologies and native people in northern Canada: an annotated bibliography of communications projects and research with Elizabeth Seaton. Montreal: Concordia University, 1984.
- The Inuit Broadcasting Corporation: current viewing tastes and preferences of the Inuit television audience in the Keewatin and Baffin regions of the Northwest Territories with Thomas C. Wilson. Montreal: Concordia University, 1984.
- "Aboriginal broadcasting in Canada" with Lorna Roth in Communication for and against democracy edited by Marc Raboy and Peter A Bruck, Montreal: Black Rose Books, 1989. ISBN 9780921689478
- "Postcards of my past: Indians and academics" in Between views edited by Daina Augaitis and Sylvie Gilbert, Banff, Alt. : Walter Phillips Gallery, 1991. ISBN 9780920159606
- Between Views and Points of View with Jody Berland, Rob Shields, Daina Augaitis and Sylvie Gilbert, Banff: The Banff Centre for the Arts, 1991. ISBN 9780920159606
- Doctor, Lawyer, Indian Chief: A Documentary Tribute to Native Women in Canada. featuring Gail Guthrie Valaskakis, Carol Geddes, Ginny Stikeman, and Barbara Jones. Prepared for the Canadian Commission for UNESCO and the Department of Secretary of State. Montreal: National Film Board of Canada, 1994.
- Indian Princesses and Cow-Girls: Stereotypes from the Frontier. with Marilyn Burgess, Rebecca Belmore. OBORO, 1995.
- Being Indian and the politics of Indianness. Boulder, Co.: Westview Press, 1998. ISBN 9780813322902
- "Telling our own stories: the role, development, and future of Aboriginal communications" in Aboriginal Education: Fulfilling A Promise, edited by Marlene Brant Castellano, Lynne Davis, and Louise Lahache, Vancouver: UBC Press, 2000. ISBN 9780774850599
- "Blood borders: being Indian and belonging" in Without guarantees: in honour of Stuart Hall edited by Stuart Hall, Paul Gilroy, Lawrence Gossberg, and Angela McRobbie, London: Verso, 2000. ISBN 9781859842874.
- "Remapping the Canadian North: Nunavut, communications and Inuit participatory development" in Citizenship and participation in the information age edited by Manjunath Pendakur and Roma M Harris, Aurora: Garamond Press, 2002. ISBN 9781551930350
- Indian Country: Essays on Contemporary Native Culture. Waterloo: Wilfrid Laurier Press, 2005. ISBN 9781417599646
- "Nunavut Territory: Communications and Political Development in Canadian North" in Hidden in Plain Sight: Contributions of Aboriginal Peoples to Canadian Identity and Culture edited by Daniel J K Beavon, Cora Jane Voyager and David Newhouse, Toronto: University of Toronto Press. ISBN 9781442688230
- Restoring the Balance: First Nations Women, Community and Culture. Eric Guimond, Gail Guthrie Valaskakis, Madeleine Dion Stout, eds. Winnipeg: University of Manitoba Press, 2009. ISBN 9780887553615
- Healing Traditions: The Mental Health of Aboriginal Peoples in Canada, edited by Laurence J. Kirmayer and Gail Guthrie Valaskakis. Vancouver: UBC Press, 2009. ISBN 9780774815239

== Awards ==
- National Aboriginal Achievement Award, Media and Communications (2002)
- Honorary doctorate, University of Ottawa (2005)
