= Edith Josie =

Canadian writer (1921–2010)

Edith Josie CM
- Born: December 8, 1921; Eagle, Alaska
- Died: January 31, 2010 (aged 88); Old Crow, Yukon, Canada
- Occupation: Writer
- Employer: Whitehorse Star
- Known for: Newspaper columns about the Yukon and Old Crow
- Awards: Order of Canada, 1995, The National Aboriginal Achievement Awards, 2000

Edith Josie CM (December 8, 1921 – January 31, 2010) was a Canadian writer, best known as a longtime columnist for the Whitehorse Star. Her column, titled Here Are the News, concerned life in the small community of Old Crow, Yukon, and was syndicated to newspapers around the world. Her writing style was noted for its offbeat smalltown charm, not always conforming to conventional notions of English grammar and spelling but instead reflective of the informal way she spoke as a non-native speaker of English:

Even now the spring has come cause it is daylight around 11 o'clock p.m. Pretty soon we won't use light for night time. Everyone glad to see plane every day. Even the same plane come in one day, they all have to go down to see what is going on and what come in on plane.

A member of the Vuntut Gwitchin First Nation, Josie was born in Eagle, Alaska, and moved to Old Crow at age 16. She earned a living selling animal skins, which her father had taught her at an early age how to trap and prepare. She was the subject of a story, "Everybody Sure Glad," by Dora Jane Hamblin in Life magazine in 1965, and served on the council of the Vuntut Gwitchin First Nation from 1968 to 1972. In her later years, Josie contributed to a community website, oldcrow.ca. In 1995, Josie was made a member of the Order of Canada. The National Aboriginal Achievement Awards, now the Indspire Awards, honoured Josie for her achievements in arts in 2000. In 2019, a bronze bust of Josie was created in her honour and displayed in Old Crow.
