= Reanna Merasty =

Artist, writer, educator, and advocate

Reanna Merasty (born 1995) is a Woodland Cree architect, writer and advocate from Manitoba, Canada. Her work centres around the importance of Indigenous representation in architecture, and advocating for and writing on Indigenous inclusion in design education.

== Early life and education ==
Reanna Merasty was born in 1995 in Kisipakakamak, Brochet, Manitoba and is a member of Barren Lands First Nation in Manitoba. She attended the University of Manitoba, earning a Bachelor of Environmental Design in 2019 and a Master of Architecture degree in 2021.

In 2019, during her undergraduate, Reanna co-founded the Indigenous Design & Planning Students Association (IDPSA), the first Indigenous student-led organization in the Faculty of Architecture at the University of Manitoba, and the first of its kind in Canada. The IDPSA advocates for the inclusion and representation of Indigenous design principals, initiatives, and programs in design education and fosters relationships with Indigenous communities. During the final year of her graduate degree (2021) Merasty Co-Edited Voices of the Land: Indigenous Design and Planning from the Prairies.

== Career and activism ==
Merasty is the Chair of the Welcoming Winnipeg Committee of Community Members with the City of Winnipeg. The Welcoming Winnipeg Committee is one aspect of the City of Winnipeg's reconciliation processes.

Merasty also sits on the Climate Action Plan Steering Committee and Indigenous Task Force with the Royal Architecture Institute of Canada, is a Board Member for the design advocacy organization Storefront Manitoba, a charitable organization focused on the critical discussion, exploration, and celebration of Manitoba's design culture, and a Board Member for the Indigenous music organization Sakihiwe Festival.

She and another Indigenous architect, Darian McKinney, were tasked with restoring a donated former department store in 2023.

As of 2024, Merasty works as an architectural intern at Number TEN Architectural Group in Winnipeg.

== Publications ==
- Co-Editor of "Voices of the Land: Indigenous Design and Planning from the Prairies" published in 2021.

== Awards ==
- In 2020, Merasty was a recipient of the Manitoba Future 40 under 40 award.
- Upon graduating with her Master's of Architecture she was awarded the Alpha Rho Chi Medal for leadership and promise of professional merit in Architecture in 2021.
- In 2023, Merasty was one of three Youth Recipients of the Inspire Awards for her work and advocacy for Indigenous inclusion and representation in design education, and was one of six individuals chosen for the National Youth Panel at the N.S. Council for the Advancement of Native Development Officers Conference.
