= Wegadesk Gorup-Paul =

Canadian diver

Wegadesk Gorup-Paul (also known as Wegadesk Gorup-Paule, born 1 December 1987), whose name means "Northern Lights" in the indigenous Mik'maq language of Nova Scotia, was a former Native-Canadian international level diver. Wegadesk retired from his career as a diver in 2007 at the age of 19 after taking up diving in 1998 as an eleven year old. Initially hesitant about the sport, Wegadesk excelled on both the national and international level of competition as a medalist at National Championships and World Junior Championships. In the year leading up to and after his retirement, Wegadesk was the recipient of several awards in community involvement, primarily with youth.

Recently Wegadesk has taken to art and performing ... both of which can be viewed on his website www.wegadesk.com

== Early life ==
Wegadesk Gorup-Paul, a native Mik'maq originally hailing from Antigonish, Nova Scotia, took up diving at the age of eleven after his mother noticed him doing flips on the family trampoline. Raised by a single mother of four, Wegadesk notes that money was always tight as a child, but the family was always able to get the funds together to travel to competition. Originally hesitant about taking up the sport at a competitive level because of the regulation "Speedo" the athletes wear in competition, Wegadesk eventually warmed up to the uniform as he quickly transformed into a highly talented diver.

== Competitive career ==
Training under coach Trevor Palmatier at the Saanich Commonwealth Place in Victoria, BC, for the Boardworks Diving program, Wegadesk began to quickly find success on both the national and international levels. Wegadesk focused primarily on platform diving and synchronized events at large competitions. With his eyes originally on competing at the 2008 Beijing Summer Olympic Games, Wegadesk had many strong results for his country and many top 10 finishes at international events. At the time of his retirement from competitive diving in 2007, Wegadesk was ranked at number three in the world for platform diving.

Competing for Canada at the 2006 Commonwealth Games in Melbourne, he placed 4th in the men's synchronized 10 metre platform event (with Riley McCormick) and 8th in the men's 10 metre platform event.

=== Results ===
Competition	Event	Result	Year
Canada Jr. Nationals	Platform	3rd	2003
Canadian Olympic Trials	Platform	6th	2004
Canadian Jr. Nationals	3M	1st	2004
World Jr. Championships	Platform	5th	2004
Canada Cup	Platform	10th	2005
World Championships	3M	17th	2005
Commonwealth Games	Platform Synchro	4th	2006
World Cup	Platform	11th	2006
Winter Senior Nationals	Platform	5th	2007
Speedo Sting	Platform	2nd	2007

== Awards ==
In 2005 Wegadesk was awarded the Roland Michener Award by the Canada Games Council. This award is given out every two years to athletes who exemplify strong leadership skills both on and off the playing field, combined with an ongoing commitment to athletic excellence. Wegadesk was given this award for his work with the First Nations Education Society as a role model to help keep First Nations youth in school. Additionally, Wegadesk received an Indspire Award in 2007 for aboriginal excellence in the community.

== Life outside of sport ==
As a diver at the youth level, during his time at Boardworks Diving, Wegadesk was the subject of sexual abuse at the hands of his coach. His coach, Trevor Palmatier, was arrested in 2013 on sex-related charges after one of his athletes came forward. It is alleged by Saanich police that sexual contact happened between the years 2004-06. Throughout his time as a competitive diver, he dealt with other personal issues that eventually lead to his retirement from the sport before his goal of the Beijing Olympics.
