= Noel Knockwood =

Canadian first nation leader

Noel Knockwood (1932-2014), a Canadian first nations leader and Mi'kmaq Grand Council member since 1975, was a spiritual leader of the Mi'kmaq People.

== Early life ==
Knockwood was born in 1932. He gained a B.A. and belonged to the National Aboriginal Veterans Association, Ontario Region. He was born to the Indian Brook First Nation of the Sipekneꞌkatik First Nation.

== Career ==
He served as Sergeant-at-Arms for the Nova Scotia Legislature from 2000 to 2005 and was recognised at the 2002 National Aboriginal Achievement Awards, now the Indspire Awards, for his stewardship of history, culture and spirituality in the native community.

Knockwood also ceremonially lifted the curse from the Angus L. Macdonald Bridge at its opening in 1955, the first bridge to be erected across The Narrows, a strait in Halifax Harbour following the fall of two others previously.

== Death ==
He died of a stroke on 7 April 2014, aged 81.
