= Cowboy Smithx =

Canadian-Blackfoot filmmaker

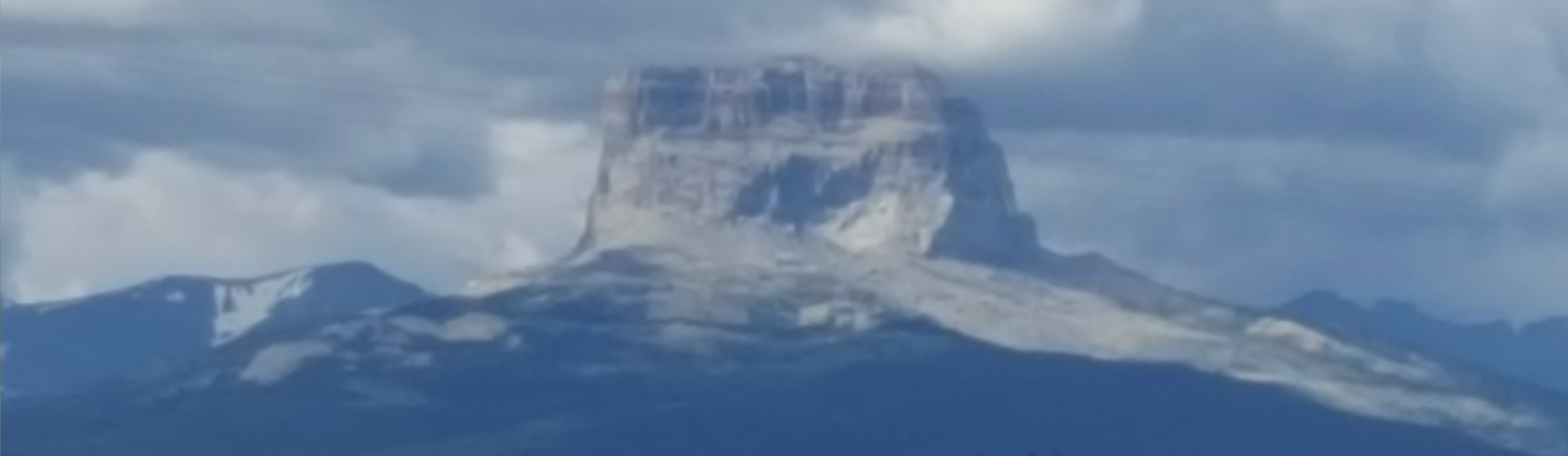
Chief Mountain

Cowboy Smithx (born January 31, 1982) is a Blackfoot filmmaker from the Piikani Nation and Kainai Nation in Southern Alberta. He has acted in, co-produced, and directed a few short films and music videos. His best known work is a full feature documentary co-produced with Chris Hsiung called, Elder in the Making. It is a film about reconciliation between non-Aboriginal and Aboriginal Peoples in Canada.

== Background ==
In 2008, Cowboy Smithx was employed as a youth worker in East Vancouver, Canada. The organization he worked for is KAYA, which stands for the, 'Knowledgeable Aboriginal Youth Association'. Cowboy Smithx is a 2008 graduate from the Indigenous Independent Digital Filmmaking Program at Capilano University. The film Smithx co-produced, Elder in the Making, will be used as an optional learning resource within Alberta schools to teach and share Indigenous ontological epistemologies. Smithx said today's youth have an opportunity through their use of convenient media opportunities to advocate for change in their communities. Cowboy Smithx recently founded the REDx Speaker Series. This production serves as a platform for reconciliation between Aboriginal and non-Aboriginal Peoples Smithx is the main stakeholder of his motion picture and film company, Eccentricus Imagery, which has been based in Vancouver B.C. since 2005.

== Film work ==
- October 2016: Cree Code Talker, co-produced by Alexandra Lazarowich & Cowboy Smithx.
- September 2016: Elder in the Making, co-produced by Chris Hsiung & Cowboy Smithx.
- 2013: Music Video-Dancin' on the Run, produced by Cowboy Smithx.
- 2013: Music Video-Red Winter, co-produced by Cowboy Smithx.
- November 2011: Music Video-2 Hour Parking, directed by Cowboy Smithx.
- July 2011: Bloodland (a short experimental film produced by Elle-Máijá Tailfeathers), acting role by Cowboy Smithx.
- September 2005: Crookz, acting role by Cowboy Smithx

== Awards ==
- March 2020: Cowboy Smithx awarded an Indspire Award for Arts. Revoked due to "personal and professional conduct that are a significant departure from generally accepted standards of public behaviour"
- April 2017: Cowboy Smithx and co-producer Alexandra Lazarowich of,' Cree Code Talker,' are nominees for best short non-fiction film at the 2017 Alberta Film and Television Awards.
- May 2016: Elder in the Making receives an award from the, Alberta Film & Television Awards and Alberta Media Production Industries Association, for best documentary over 30 minutes
- April 2016: Cowboy Smithx and fellow co-producer, Alexandra Lazarowich, win first place at the HotDocs Bravo Factual Short Film Pitching Competition. They use this monetary award to finance the, 'Cree Code Talker,' short film
