= Rose Boyko =

Canadian First Nations lawyer and retired judge

- Born: 1950 (age 75–76)
- Education: Queen's University
- Occupations: lawyer, judge

Rose Toodick Boyko is a Canadian First Nations lawyer and retired judge. She was the first aboriginal woman appointed as a superior court judge in Canada. Her mother was Sekani, her father Ukrainian. She is a member of the McLeod Lake Indian Band. Born in 1950, her early memories are of life on the trapline on the Parsnip River near Finlay Forks in northern British Columbia. Her family's trapline was flooded by the construction of the W. A. C. Bennett Dam in 1967.

== Biography ==
She initially trained as nurse, receiving her R.N. diploma from the Royal Victoria Hospital in 1972. She served in remote Cree communities in the James Bay area and then as a critical care nurse at Kingston General Hospital.

Deciding to shift her attention to law, she enrolled for pre-law studies in the Saskatchewan Aboriginal Law Program, followed by law school at Queen's University, from which she received her law degree in 1980. She was called to the Ontario bar in 1982 and to the Saskatchewan bar in 1988.

=== Judicial career ===
She began her legal career with the Department of Justice in Ontario, Alberta and Saskatchewan. This was followed by an intergovernmental exchange with the Quebec Ministry of Justice in Quebec City from 1989 to 1991. This was followed by a move to the Indian Taxation Secretariat of the Department of Indian Affairs in Ottawa where she remained until she was appointed to the Ontario Superior Court in 1994. She retired from the court in 2008.

== Honours ==
In 1997 she received an honorary Doctor of Laws degree from Queens University. In 1999 she received a National Aboriginal Achievement Award, now the Indspire Awards, in the Law and Justice category. In 2008 she was elected to the United Nations Appeals Tribunal. In 2012 she received the Queen Elizabeth II Diamond Jubilee Medal.
