= Emma LaRocque =

Canadian academic (born 1949)

- Born: 2 January 1949 (age 77); Big Bay, Alberta, Canada

Academic background
- Education: Goshen College; Associated Mennonite Biblical Seminary; University of Manitoba
- Thesis: Native Writers Resisting Colonizing Practices in Canadian Historiography and Literature (1999)

Academic work
- Discipline: Native studies
- Institutions: University of Manitoba
- Notable works: When the Other Is Me (2010)

Emma LaRocque (born 1949) is a Canadian academic of Cree and Métis descent. She is a professor of Native American studies at the University of Manitoba.

She is also a published poet, writing brief and imagist poems about her ancestral land and culture. LaRocque's works have focused on topics such as Indigenous identities, contemporary Indigenous literature, postcolonial literary criticism, decolonization and resistance, and Indigenous representation in Canadian history, literature, and popular culture.

LaRocque has published works in numerous fields. Her work advocates for Indigenous literatures as resistance, and brings misrepresentation of Indigenous peoples in Canada to light. LaRocque is also known for her deconstruction of the "civilized/savage" dichotomy, which she problematizes in relation to her own Métis identity.

== Early life ==
LaRocque was born in the remote community of Big Bay, Alberta, near the town of Lac La Biche. She came from a family of fur trappers, and was one of the first in her family to receive a formal education. Despite her parents' uneasiness toward their daughter's enthusiasm for education, the author-to-be "howled [her] way into school". Though English was not LaRocque's first language, this did not impede her from excelling in her early education. After she completed high school, LoRocque worked as a counsellor for juvenile criminal offenders. LaRocque also worked as a teacher at the Janvier 194 reserve until 1971, when she moved to the United States to attend Goshen College, Indiana.

== Education ==
In 1973, LaRocque graduated with a Bachelor of Arts degree in Communications and English from Goshen College, and later attended the Associated Mennonite Biblical Seminary, graduating with a Master of Arts degree in peace studies in 1976. Before entering academia, she briefly worked as a reporter and editor for Native People, a newspaper published by the Alberta Native Communications Society.

LaRocque joined the University of Manitoba faculty in 1976, and received a second Master of Arts degree in 1980, in Canadian history. She completed a doctorate in 1999 from the University of Manitoba. Her dissertation was focused on Aboriginal resistance literature.

== Publications ==
=== Books ===
- When the Other Is Me: Native Resistance Discourse 1850-1990, University of Manitoba Press. 2010.
- Paul DePasquale, Renate Eigenbrod and Emma LaRocque (eds). Across Cultures/Across Borders: Canadian Aboriginal and Native American Literatures. Broadview Press, 2010.
- Emma LaRoque, Defeathering The Indian. Agincourt: Book Society of Canada, 1975.
- E. LaRoque, O. Haythorne, S. Layton. Natives of North America: A Selected Bibliography. Alberta Department of Education, Edmonton, 1975.

==== Appears in ====
- Emma LaRocque. “Decoloniser les postcoloniaux” in Nous Sommes des Histoires: reflexions sur la literature autochtone: 193-206. Marie-Helene Jeannotte, J. Lamy and I. St-Amand, eds. Trad. By Jean-Pierre Pelletier. Montreal: Memoire d’encrier, 2018. 277p. Trans. From my book When the Other Is Me (2010).
- “Metis and Feminist: Contemplations on Feminism, Human Rights, Culture and Decolonization.” Revised. Joyce Green, ed. Making Space for Indigenous Feminism (2nd edition). Halifax and Winnipeg: Fernwood Publishing, 2017. pp 122–145. *Two poems “My Hometown Northern Canada South Africa” and “Long Way From Home” are also in this edition.
- “Contemporary Metis Literature: Roots, Resistance, Innovation”, Cynthia Sugars, ed. Oxford Handbook of Canadian Literature. New York: Oxford University Press, 2016. pp 129–49.
- “‘Resist No Longer’: Reflections on Resistance Writing and Teaching.” Elaine Coburn, editor. Foreword by Emma LaRocque. More Will Sing Their Way to Freedom: Indigenous Resistance and Resurgence. Halifax: Fernwood Publishers, 2016. pp 5-23.
- “Teaching Aboriginal Literature: The Discourse of Margins and Mainstreams.” (Rpt) Deanna Reder and L. Morris, eds. Approaching Indigenous Literatures in the 21st Century. Wilfrid Laurier University Press, 2016. pp 55–72.
- “Preface or Here Are Our Voices - Who Will Hear?” (Rpt). Heather McFarlane and A. Ruffo, eds. Introduction To Indigenous Literary Criticism in Canada. Peterborough: Broadview Press, 2016. pp 47–60.
- “Geese Over the City”, “Nostalgia”, and “Progress” (poems, rpts), analyzed in Carl Tracie, Shaping a World Already Made: Poetry and Landscape in Western Canada. Regina: University of Regina Press, 2016.
- “Uniform of the Dispossessed” (poem), Rpt. Woman: An Anthology. Alana Brooks, ed. Winnipeg: At Bay Press, 2014.
- “For the Love of Place - Not Just Any Place: Selected Metis Writings”, Adele Perry and Leah Morton, eds. Place and Replace: Collection of Essays. Winnipeg: University of Manitoba Press, 2013.
- “A Personal Essay on Poverty” (section from Defeathering The Indian), Armand Ruffo, Daniel David Moses & T. Goldie, Anthology: Canadian Native Literature in English (4th edition), Oxford University Press, 2012.
- Three poems included in N.J. Sinclair and Warren Cariou, eds. Manitowapow: Aboriginal Writings From the Land of Water. Winnipeg: Portage and Main Press, 2012.
- “Reflections on Cultural Continuity Through Aboriginal Women’s Writing”, Gail Valaskakis, Madeleine Dion Stout and Eric Guimond, eds. Restoring The Balance: First Nations Women, Community, and Culture. Winnipeg: University of Manitoba Press, 2009.
- “Metis and Feminist: Ethical Reflections on Feminism, Human Rights and Decolonization”, and “My Hometown Northern Canada South Africa” in J. Green, ed. Making Space for Indigenous Feminism. Halifax: Fernwood Publisher, 2007.
- “When the Wild West Is Me: Re-viewing Cowboys and Indians.” Challenging Frontiers: The Canadian West. B. Rasporich and L. Felske, eds. University of Calgary Press, 2005.
- “A Personal Essay on Poverty” (Excerpt from Defeathering The Indian, 1975). Pens of Many Colours: A Canadian Reader (3rd Edition). Eva C. Karpinski, ed. Scarborough: Thomson-Nelson, 2002.
- “Teaching Native Literatures: Margins and Mainstreams.” Creating Community: A Roundtable on Canadian Aboriginal Literature. Renate Eigenbrod and Jo-Ann Episkenew, eds. Brandon University: Bearpaw Publishing and Penticton: Theytus Publishing, 2002.
- “Native Identity and the Metis: Otepayimsuak Peoples.” A Passion For Identity: An Introduction to Canadian Studies (4th edition). D. Taras and B. Rasporich, eds. International Thomson Publishing, 2001.
- Poetry (9 poems) in Anthology of Native Poetry in Canada, Lally Grauer and Jeannette Armstrong, eds. Broadview Press, 2001.
- “Long Way From Home” (poem, 1994). Rpt in Pushing The Margins: Native and Northern Studies. J. Oakes and R. Riewe, M. Bennet and B. Chisholm, eds. Native Studies Press, 2000.
- “Loneliness” (poem, 1990). Rpt in Prentice Hall, 2000.
- “From the Land to the Classroom: Broadening Aboriginal Epistemology” Issues in the North, Special Issue: Celebrating 25 Years of Excellence in Native Studies, University of Manitoba, 2000
- “An Evening Walk” (poem, 1986). Rpt in Sightlines Grade 8. Toronto: Prentice Hall Ginn, 1999.
- “Tides, Towns and Trains” in Reinventing The Enemy’s Language: Contemporary Native Women’s Writings of North America, Joy Harjo and Gloria Bird, eds. New York: W.W. Norton & Co., 1997, pp. 361–374.
- “Re-examining Culturally Appropriate Models in Criminal Justice Applications” in Aboriginal and Treaty Rights in Canada: Essays on Law, Equality and Respect for Difference, Michael Asch, ed. UBC Press, 1997, pp. 75–96.
- “When The Other Is Me: Native Writers Confronting Canadian Literature” in Issues in the North, Volume I, Jill Oakes and Ricke Riewe, eds. Canadian Circumpolar Institute, 1996, pp. 115–124.
- “The Colonization of a Native Woman Scholar” in Women of the First Nations, P. Chucryk and C. Miller, eds. University of Manitoba Press, 1996, pp. 11–18.
- "Violence in Aboriginal Communities" in The Path To Healing: Report of the National Round Table on Aboriginal Health and Social Issues, the Royal Commission on Aboriginal Peoples, Minister of Supply and Services, 1993, pp. 72–89.
- ”Three Conventional Approaches to Native People In Society and In Literature” Survival of the Imagination: The Mary Donaldson Memorial Lectures, Brett Balon and Peter Resch, eds. Coteau Books: Saskatchewan Library Association, 1993, pp. 209–218.
- “Conversations with Emma LaRocque” in Contemporary Challenges: Conversations with Canadian Native Authors, Hartmut Lutz. Saskatchewan: Fifth House Publishers, 1991, pp. 181–202.
- “Racism Runs Through Canadian Society” in Racism in Canada, Ormond McKague, ed. Saskatoon: Fifth House Publishers, 1991, pp. 73–76.
- “Brown Sister” “Eulogy For Priscilla” “The Geese Over the City” (translated into German) in Four Feathers: Poems and Stories by Canadian Native Authors, Hartmut Lutz, ed. O.B.E.M.A. Co-operative, Germany, 1991, pp. 142–159.
- Excerpt from Defeathering The Indian and two poems: “When I First Came to the City” and “The Geese Over the City” in Our Bit of Truth, Agnes Grant, ed., Winnipeg: Pemmican Publications, 1990, pp. 205–208, 341-343.
- "Preface or Here Are Our Voices -- Who will Hear?" Writing The Circle: Women of Western Canada, Jeanne Perreault and Sylvia Vance, eds. Edmonton: NeWest Publishers, 1990, pp. xv-xxx.
- Thirteen Poems in Writing The Circle: Women of Western Canada, Jeanne Perreault and Sylvia Vance, eds. Edmonton: NeWest Publishers Publishers, 1990, pp. xxx, and 143-155.
- "Racism/Sexism and its Effects on Native Women" in Public Concerns on Human Rights: A Summary of Briefs, Ottawa: Canadian Human Rights Commission, 1990, pp. 30–40.
- "On The Ethics of Publishing Historical Documents" in 'The Orders of the Dreamed': George Nelson on Cree and Northern Ojibwa Religion a Myth, 1823. Jennifer S.H. Brown, Robert Brightman, eds., University of Manitoba Press, 1988, pp. 199–203.
- "Cuthbert Grant". The Canadian Encyclopedia, Vol. II, Hurtig Publishers, 1985, p. 766.
- E. LaRocque and M. Beaucage. "Two faces of the New Jerusalem: Indian/Metis reaction to the missionaries." Visions of the New Jerusalem: Religious Settlement of the Prairies, B. Smillie, ed., NeWest Publishers, Edmonton, Alberta, 1983, pp. 27–38.
