= Marion Meadmore =

Canadian Ojibwa-Cree activist (1935–2025)

- Born: Marion Ironquill; July 11, 1935; Peepeekisis First Nation Reserve near Balcarres, Saskatchewan, Canada
- Died: February 19, 2025 (aged 89); Winnipeg, Canada
- Other names: Marion Ironqil Meadmore, Marion Ironquil
- Occupations: Native rights activist, lawyer
- Years active: 1959-present
- Known for: First woman indigenous lawyer in Canada

Marion Ironquill Meadmore (July 11, 1935 – February 19, 2025) was an Ojibwa-Cree Canadian activist and lawyer. Meadmore was the first woman of the First Nations to attain a law degree in Canada. She founded the first Indian and Métis Friendship Centre in Canada to assist Indigenous people who had relocated to urban areas with adjustments to their new communities. She edited the native newspaper, The Prairie Call, bringing cultural events as well as socio-economic challenges into discussion for native communities. She was the only woman on the Temporary Committee of the National Indian Council, which would later become the Assembly of First Nations, and who would become the secretary-treasurer of the organization when it was formalized. She was one of the women involved in the launch of the Kinew Housing project, to bring affordable, safe housing to indigenous urban dwellers and a founder of the Indigenous Bar Association of Canada. She received the Order of Canada as well as many other honors for her activism on behalf of indigenous people. She was a founder and served on the National Indigenous Council of Elders.

== Early life ==
Marion Ironquill was born in 1936 on the Peepeekisis First Nation Reserve near Balcarres, Saskatchewan, Canada, to Helen and Joseph Ironquill. Her mother was of Cree heritage and her father was Ojibwa. She grew up on her family's farm and attended school ten months of the year at a residential school twelve miles away because there was no school available locally.

She graduated from Birtle Collegeate, a parochial institution which left her with a feeling that she did not belong in either the aboriginal world or the non-native world. Aged 16, she enrolled in pre-med courses at the University of Manitoba in Winnipeg. After two years of science studies in 1954, Ironquill left school to marry Ronald Hector Meadmore, who would go on to earn fame in the Canadian Football League. The couple had three children, Glen, Neil and Jim. For nearly twenty years, Meadmore raised her children and participated in social projects.

== Career and activism ==
In 1959, Meadmore helped establish a gathering place where urban native people around Winnipeg could gather, called the Indian and Métis Friendship Centre (IMFC). The center was the first one in Canada and has since been replicated dozens of times. Meadmore worked full-time as a liaison at the IMFC. As the center grew, it established a newspaper, The Prairie Call, which was organized in 1961 as a means of featuring aboriginal writings and notifications of activities. Meadmore, who was the editor of The Prairie Call recognized that it was a means to build a community concerned with the legal and socio-economic issues facing Indigenous people and used the paper to discuss realities of urban life as well as human rights issues.

Simultaneously, she joined with Telford Adams, A.H. Brass, Joe Keeper, David Knight and George Manuel to form the Temporary Committee of the National Indian Council, which would later become the Assembly of First Nations. The goal was to create a national body committed to both advancement of native people and preservation of their identity, where native people could come up with their own solutions to the problems facing their cultures. When the organization's board was formalized the following year, Meadmore was elected secretary-treasurer.

In 1970, Meadmore was appointed to the National Council of Welfare. That same year, after witnessing the struggles a friend had in securing safe housing on a limited budget, Meadmore helped launch the Kinew Housing project, under the sponsorship of the IMFC. She and Mary Guilbault were instrumental in both founding the Kinew project and advocating for a social housing policy. Seeking the cooperation of private funding and the Canada Mortgage and Housing Corporation (CMHC), they secured houses at favorable prices. Renovations were completed by Indigenous workers, to make the homes livable and safe, and they were then offered to Native Canadians at reasonable rates. Then counselors from IMFC met with tenants to give advice on a range of issues including housing concerns and tips to dealing with employers and the urban environment. Because the housing purchases required use of a lawyer, Meadmore began to think about returning to school, to better understand the legal impact on business and economic development programs.

When Meadmore completed her law degree in 1977 at the University of Manitoba, she became the first Canadian Indigenous woman lawyer. First working at Legal Aid Manitoba, practicing criminal and family law, Meadmore soon opened Winnipeg's first all-female law firm, which focused on corporate law. She was one of the founders of the Canadian Indian Lawyers Association, now known as the Indigenous Bar Association of Canada. In 1982, she left the active practice of law and began the Indian Business Development Group to encourage growth in native businesses.

Meadmore was one of the founders of the National Indigenous Council of Elders (NICE), which strives to join First Nation elders from across Canada to develop economic programs which will enable Canada's indigenous people to operate without government funding. Because the tribes have trusts in the billions of dollars, and understand the needs of their own communities in a way that the government cannot, they are pushing to be able to manage their own funds and solve their own social problems.

== Awards and honors ==
In 1985, Meadmore was awarded membership in the Order of Canada. In 2010, she was honored with the title of "Grandmother" from the Ka Ni Kanichihk service organization, which hosts the annual Keeping the Fires Burning Aboriginal Awards to recognize women who serve as role models for younger indigenous women.

In 2014, she was awarded an Indspire Awards laureate designation for law by the Indspire Foundation and the University of Manitoba granted a Lifetime Achievement Award to Meadmore in 2015.
