= Rita Bouvier =

Métis educator and poet

Rita Bouvier is a Métis educator and poet. Her poetry mixes English with Cree and Michif words and phrases.

== Life ==
Bouvier was born in 1950 in Île-à-la-Crosse (Sakitawak), Saskatchewan, where she lived until moving to Saskatoon, Saskatchewan, where she currently resides. Bouvier holds a M.Ed. from the University of Saskatchewan.

== Published works ==
- Blueberry Clouds (Thistledown Press 1999)
- Resting Lightly on Mother Earth: The Aboriginal Experience in Urban Educational Settings (Editor) (Brush Education 2001)
- papîyâhtak (Thistledown Press 2004)
- nakomowin’sa (Thistledown Press 2015)
- Keetsahnak / Our Missing and Murdered Indigenous Sisters (contributor) (University of Alberta Press 2018)

== Awards ==
Bouvier's first book of poetry, Blueberry Clouds was published in 1999 by Thistledown Press and was nominated for the 2000 First People's Publishing Saskatchewan Book Award. Bouvier was also honoured in 2010 with a Saskatchewan Aboriginal Literacy Award (Practitioner Category). nakomowin’sa for the seasons was the 2016 winner of the Saskatchewan Rasmussen, Rasmussen & Charowsky Aboriginal Peoples’ Writing Award.
