= Ron Meadmore =

Canadian football player

Profile
- Position: End

Personal information
- Born: December 26, 1933; Culross, Manitoba, Canada
- Died: August 3, 2013 (aged 79); Winnipeg, Manitoba, Canada
- Listed height: 6 ft 2 in (1.88 m)
- Listed weight: 215 lb (98 kg)

Career history
- 1955–1965: Winnipeg Blue Bombers

Awards and highlights
- Grey Cup champion (1958, 1959, 1961, 1962)

Ron Hector Meadmore (December 26, 1933 – August 3, 2013) was a Canadian professional football player who played for the Winnipeg Blue Bombers. He won the Grey Cup with them in 1958, 1959, 1961 and 1962. He also played for three years with the Saskatchewan Roughriders. Meadmore married Marion Ironquill, the first indigenous lawyer of Canada, in 1954. After his football career, he was a farmer. He died in 2013.
