= Cornelia Wieman =

Canadian psychiatrist (born 1964)

- Born: 1964 (age 61–62); Little Grand Rapids First Nation, Manitoba, Canada
- Awards: Governor General's Academic Medal; Indspire Awards (1998)

Academic background
- Education: BSc, Kinesiology, 1988, MSc, Biomechanics, 1991, University of Waterloo; MD, 1993, McMaster University
- Thesis: Electromyography of the Trunk and Lower Limb Muscles During Gait of Elderly and Younger Subjects: Implications for the Control of Balance

Cornelia Gertrude nel Wieman (born 1964) (Anishinaabe) is a Canadian psychiatrist. She is the first Indigenous woman to become a psychiatrist in Canada and the First Nations Health Authority deputy Chief Medical Officer.

== Early life and education ==
Wieman was born in 1964 in Little Grand Rapids First Nation, Manitoba, Canada but was forcefully taken from her family during the Sixties Scoop. She was subsequently adopted by a family of Dutch immigrants and raised in Thunder Bay, Ontario. Growing up in Thunder Bay, Wieman said she did not know any Indigenous doctors and "didn't consider it as something I could do." She enrolled at the University of Waterloo for her Bachelor of Science and Master's degree but she wrote and defended her thesis after starting her medical studies at McMaster University. During her undergraduate career, Wieman received the Governor General's Academic Medal for high academic distinction. While attending McMaster, Wieman received significant mentoring from Aboriginal doctors leading her to begin focusing on psychiatry as a speciality.

During her 5-year post-graduate residency at McMaster, Wieman was appointed to numerous official positions. In 1996, she was elected the President of the Resident's Association, where she acted as an informal counsellor to residents in distress as well as a mentor for the junior residents. She was also elected the Chair of the Native Mental Health Section of the Canadian Psychiatric Association in 1997. Upon graduating in 1998, Wieman became the first aboriginal woman to train as a psychiatrist and subsequently received the National Aboriginal Achievement (Indspire) Award.

== Career ==
Following her residency, Wieman was appointed Native Students Health Sciences Co-ordinator at McMaster University's Faculty of Health Sciences. In this role, she assessed McMaster's curriculum for cultural sensitivity and the amount of information included on aboriginal health issues. While serving in this academic appointment, Wieman also consulted with various national agencies in regards to the delivery of health care for Indigenous people. She worked at a community-based mental health clinic on the Six Nations of the Grand River reserve and was appointed to the Suicide Prevention Advisory Group (SPAG) of the Federal Ministry of Health. As a member of the SPAG, Wieman investigated the high suicide rate among Indigenous youth which was 5 to 6 times higher than that among non-Indigenous youth in Canada. In 2002, Wieman was named the inaugural recipient of Waterloo's Applied Health Sciences Alumni Achievement Award. While still working at McMaster, Wieman helped the school establish the first Aboriginal health elective in Canada. She worked with medical students in 2004 to create the elective by providing input from an aboriginal perspective.

As a result of her efforts in Indigenous mental health, Wieman became an assistant professor in the Department of Public Health Services at the University of Toronto where she also served as Co-Director of the Indigenous Health Research Development Program. In recognition of her significant contributions, Wieman was appointed by Tony Clement to serve a three-year term on the Canadian Institutes of Health Research Governing Council. She also received the Queen Elizabeth II’s Diamond Jubilee Medal in 2012. In an effort to continue her efforts advocating for better mental health services, Wieman accepted a full-time position at the Centre for Addiction and Mental Health (CAMH) in 2013 and spent one day a week to work as a faculty adviser to the Aboriginal Student's Health Sciences Program at McMaster.

Wieman left CAMH in 2016 to become the Acting Deputy Chief Medical Officer for the First Nations Health Authority and President of the Board of the Indigenous Physicians Association of Canada. Upon moving to British Columbia, Wieman was appointed to the Provincial Task Team to respond to the "In Plain Sight: Addressing Indigenous-specific Racism and Discrimination in B.C. Health Care" Report as well as Co-Chairing the Cultural Safety and Humility Technical Committee. In December 2022, Wieman accepted an adjunct professor position at the University of British Columbia's Department of Psychiatry.
