= Madeleine Dion Stout =

Cree Canadian author and speaker

Madeleine Dion Stout CM
- Kétéskwew
- Born: Kehewin 123, Alberta, Canada
- Writing career
- Language: Cree
- Notable awards: Order of Canada,

Madeleine (Kétéskwew) Dion Stout CM is a Cree author, speaker, and health care professional. She was appointed to the Order of Canada in 2015.

== Personal life and education ==
Madeleine Dion Stout was born on Kehewin First Nation, Alberta. She graduated as a registered nurse from the Edmonton General Hospital in 1968. Dion Stout later went on to continue her education at the University of Lethbridge, Alberta to earn a bachelor's degree in nursing in 1982. Dion Stout was one of the first Indigenous women to graduate from a university level nursing program. In 1993, she received a master's degree in international affairs from Carleton University in Ottawa, Ontario.

Dion Stout is currently a resident of Tsawassen First Nation.

== Career ==
After becoming a registered nurse, Dion Stout worked at Health and Welfare Canada the Edmonton General Hospital, and as a public health nurse on Peigan First Nation. After receiving her nursing degree, Dion Stout gained employment with the Alberta Indian Health Care Commission. In 1983, she began working as a special advisor to the federal minister of Health and Welfare. In 1985, she was appointed as the director of the Indian and Inuit Health Careers Program. Dion Stout is a former Canadian Studies professor at Carleton University and served as the founding director of Carleton's Centre for Aboriginal Education, Research and Culture (1989 - 1993).

Dion Stout has held numerous appointments on professional committees and associations including: National Collaborating Centre for Aboriginal Health board member; Well Living House at St. Michael's Hospital Council of Grandparents; president of the Aboriginal Nurses Association of Canada; member of the National Forum on Health; British Columbia First Nations Health Authority Board member; Vice-Chair of the Mental Health Commission of Canada board of directors.

Dion Stout is currently self-employed as the president of Dion Stout Reflections Inc. and currently speaks throughout North America and Europe on topics relating to Indigenous health, reconciliation, and healing.

== Bibliography ==
- Aboriginal Canada: Women and Health. Ottawa: Women's Health Bureau, Health Canada. 1996.
- Aboriginal Women in Canada: strategic research directions for policy development. Ottawa: Status of Women Canada.1998. By Madeleine Dion Stout, Gregory D. Kipling. ISBN 9780662634317
- Aboriginal Women's Health Research Synthesis Project: Final Report. Ottawa: The Centres. 2001. By Madeleine Dion Stout, Gregory D. Kipling, Roberta Stout. ISBN 9780968928509
- The Health Transition Fund. Ottawa: The Fund. 2002. By Madeleine Dion Stout, Gregory D. Kipling. ISBN 9780662663089
- Aboriginal People, Resilience and the Residential School Legacy. Ottawa: Aboriginal Healing Foundation. 2003. By Madeleine Dion Stout and Gregory Kipling ISBN 0-9733976-5-9
- Lump Sum Compensation Payments Research Project: The Circle Rechecks Itself. Aboriginal Healing Foundation. 2007. ISBN 9781897285534
- "A Survivor Reflects on Resilience" in From Truth to Reconciliation: Transforming the Legacy of Residential Schools. Aboriginal Healing Foundation. 2008. ISBN 978-1-897285-59-6
- Restoring the Balance: First Nations Women, Community, and Culture. Winnipeg: University of Manitoba Press. 2009. By Eric Guimond, Madeleine Dion Stout, Gail Guthrie Valaskakis. ISBN 9780887551864.
- Knowledge Exchange Workshop: Successful Approaches for the Prevention of Aboriginal Family Violence - Final Report. Quebec. 2009.
- "Towards Nahi: Addressing Health Equity in Research Involving Indigenous People" in Canadian Journal of Nursing Research 2012. By Annette J. Browne and Madeleine Dion Stout.

== Awards ==
Dion Stout has received numerous awards for her work in the health care field and with Indigenous communities including:

- Assiniwkimaik Award, Aboriginal Nurses Association of Canada
- Distinguished Alumnus Award, University of Lethbridge (1995)
- Honorary Doctor of Laws, University of British Columbia
- Honorary Doctor of Laws, University of Ottawa
- Centennial Award, Canadian Nurses Association of Canada (2008)
- Health Category, National Aboriginal Achievement Award (2010)
- Honorary Doctor of Laws, Carleton University (2015)
- Order of Canada Appointment (2015)
