= Indigenous architecture =

Field of architecture

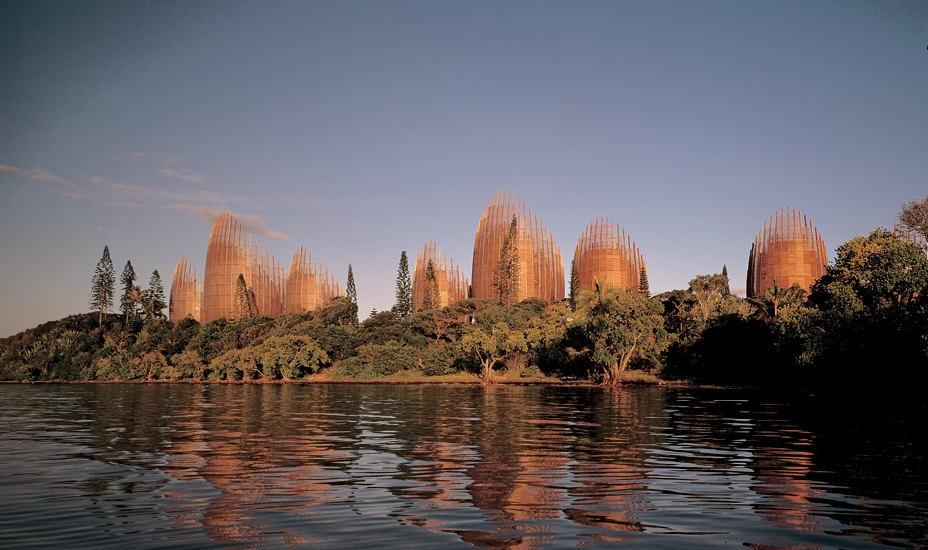
The Jean-Marie Tjibaou Cultural Center by architect Renzo Piano, Nouméa, New Caledonia (Kanaky) The complex was named after Jean-Marie Tjibaou, the leader of the independence movement (assassinated in 1989), who had a vision of establishing a cultural centre which included the linguistic and artistic heritage of the Kanak people.

Indigenous architecture refers to the study and practice of architecture of, for, and by Indigenous peoples.

This field of study and practice in Australia, Canada, the circumpolar regions, New Zealand, the United States, and many other regions where Indigenous people have a built tradition or aspire translate or to have their cultures translated in the built environment. This has been extended to landscape architecture, planning, placemaking, public art, urban design, and other ways of contributing to the design of built environments. The term usually designates culture-specific architecture: it covers both the vernacular architecture and contemporary or new traditional architecture inspired by the enculture, even when the latter includes features brought from outside.

== Australia ==
The traditional or vernacular architecture of Indigenous Australians, including Aboriginal Australians and Torres Strait Islanders, varied to meet the lifestyle, social organisation, family size, cultural and climatic needs and resources available to each community.

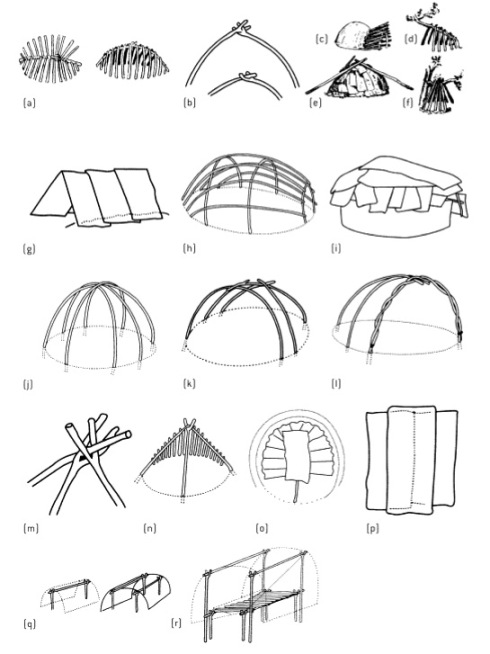
Walter Roth: Studies of Aboriginal ethnoarchitectural forms, Queensland, 1897

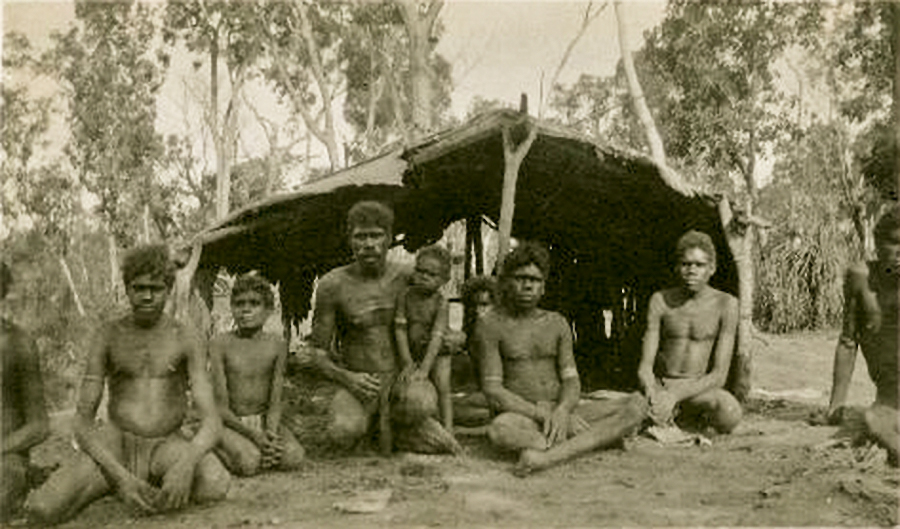
Indigenous Australian boys and men in front of a bush shelter, Groote Eylandt, circa 1933

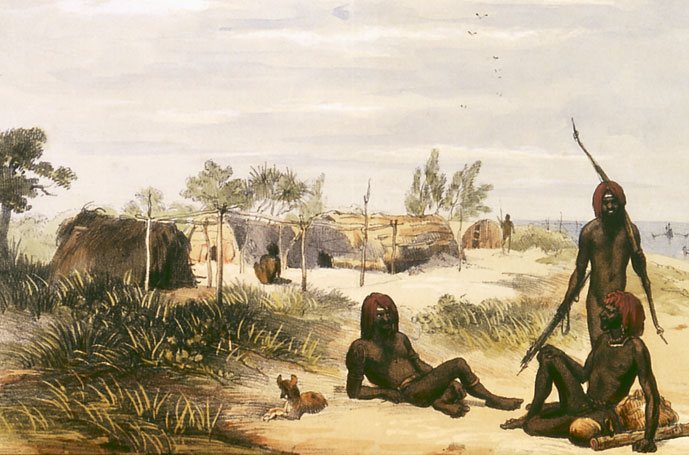
Ethnoarchitectural forms constructed by the Torres Strait Islanders on the exposed beaches and cays at Mt Ernest Island (Naghi or Nagheer). Hand-coloured lithograph by Melville, c. 1849

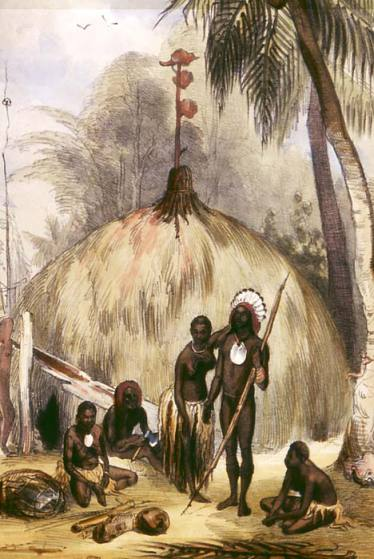
Example of Mer Island (or Murray Island) architecture (Torres Strait Islands). Round form covered with dried banana leaves with sleeping platforms placed inside. Hand-coloured lithograph by Melville, c. 1849

The types of forms varied from dome frameworks made of cane through spinifex-clad arc-shaped structures, to tripod and triangular shelters and elongated, egg-shaped, stone-based structures with a timber frame to pole and platform constructions. Annual base camp structures, whether dome houses in the rainforests of Queensland and Tasmania or stone-based houses in south-eastern Australia, were often designed for use over many years by the same family groups. Different language groups had differing names for structures. These included humpy, gunyah (or gunya), goondie, wiltja and wurley (or wurlie).

Until the 20th century, many non-Indigenous people assumed that Indigenous Australian peoples lacked permanent buildings, likely because Europeans misinterpreted Indigenous lifeways ways during early contact. Labelling Indigenous Australian communities as 'nomadic' allowed early settlers to justify the takeover of Traditional Lands claiming that they were not inhabited by permanent residents.

Stone engineering was utilised by a number of Indigenous language groups. Examples of Indigenous Australian stone structures come from Western Victoria's Gunditjmara peoples. These builders utilised basalt rocks around Lake Condah to erect housing and complicated systems of stone weirs, fish, and eel traps, and gates in water-course creeks. The lava-stone homes had circular stone walls over a metre high and topped with a dome roof made of earth or sod cladding. Evidence of sophisticated stone engineering has been found in other parts of Australia. As late as 1894, a group of around 500 people still lived in houses near Bessibelle that were constructed out of stone with sod cladding on a timber-framed dome. Nineteenth-century observers also reported flat slab slate-type stone housing in South Australia's northeast corner. These dome-shaped homes were built on heavy limbs and used clay to fill in the gaps. In New South Wales' Warringah area, stone shelters were constructed in an elongated egg shape and packed with clay to keep the interior dry.

=== Australian Indigenous housing design ===
Housing for Indigenous people living in many parts of Australia has been characterised by an acute shortage of dwellings, poor quality construction, and housing stock ill-suited to Indigenous lifestyles and preferences. Rapid population growth, shorter lifetimes for housing stock, and rising construction costs have meant that efforts to limit overcrowding and provide healthy living environments for Indigenous people have been difficult for governments to achieve. Indigenous housing design and research is a specialised field within housing studies. There have been two main approaches to the design of Indigenous housing in Australia – Health and Culture.

The cultural design model attempts to incorporate understandings of differences in Indigenous Australian cultural norms into housing design. There is a large body of knowledge on Indigenous housing in Australia that promotes the provision and design of housing that supports Indigenous residents' socio-spatial needs, domiciliary behaviours, cultural values and aspirations. The culturally specific needs for Indigenous housing have been identified as major factors in the success of housing and failing to recognise the varying and diverse cultural housing needs of Indigenous peoples have been cited as the reasons for Indigenous Australian housing failures by Western academics for decades. Western-style housing imposes conditions on Indigenous residents that may hinder the practice of cultural norms. If adjusting to living in a particular house strains relationships, then severe stress on the occupants may result. Ross noted, "Inappropriate housing and town planning have the capacity to disrupt the social organisation, the mechanisms for maintaining smooth social relations, and support networks." A range of cultural factors are discussed in the literature. These include designing housing to accommodate aspects of customer behaviour such as avoidance behaviours, household group structures, sleeping and eating behaviours, cultural constructs of crowding and privacy, and responses to death. The literature indicates that each housing design should be approached independently to recognise the many Indigenous cultures with varying customs and practices that exist across Australia.

The health approach to housing design developed as housing is an important factor affecting the health of Indigenous Australians. Substandard and poorly maintained housing along with non-functioning infrastructure can create serious health risks. The 'Housing for Health' approach developed from observations of the housing factors affecting Indigenous Australian peoples' health into a methodology for measuring, rating, and fixing 'household hardware' deemed essential for health. The approach is based on nine 'healthy housing principles' which are the:

1. ability to wash people (especially children),
2. ability to wash clothes and bedding,
3. removing waste,
4. improving nutrition and food safety,
5. reducing impact of crowding,
6. reducing impact of pests or vermin
7. controlling dust,
8. temperature control, and
9. reducing injury.

=== Contemporary Indigenous architecture in Australia ===
Defining what is 'Indigenous architecture' in the contemporary context is a debate in some spheres. Many researchers and practitioners generally agree that Indigenous architectural projects are those which are designed with Indigenous clients or projects that imbue indigeneity through consultation, and advance Indigenous Australian agency. This latter category may include projects which are designed primarily for non-Indigenous users. Notwithstanding the definition, a range of projects have been designed for, by or with Indigenous users. The application of evidence-based research and consultation has led to museums, courts, cultural centres, keeping houses, prisons, schools, and a range of other institutional and residential buildings being designed to meet the varying and differing needs and aspirations of Indigenous users.

In 2025, the First Nations Advisory Committee to the Australian Institute of Architects defined Indigenous Design and Architecture in their resource titled, Terms, Concepts and Shared Understandings:

Indigenous Design and Architecture are terms which were coined in the late 1990s to illustrate the emerging field of architects (Indigenous and non-Indigenous) working collaboratively with First Nations communities, clients and projects. In academic contexts Indigenous Design and Architecture was considered as created with and for Indigenous Peoples. The terminology is constantly evolving, and Indigenous Design and Architecture can be viewed as a collection of experiences, a creative practice and expression of First Nations cultures, rather than an accreditation or attribution. It is led by First Nations voices, and those with experience designing with First Nations Peoples. Indigenous Design and Architecture reflects the deep connection between First Nations communities and their Countries and cultures. Indigenous Design and Architecture acknowledges the cultural significance of designs created by First Nations Peoples, and recognises that design originates from their unique histories, cultures, places and environments. Indigenous Design and Architecture may include traditional materials, aesthetics, and methods of creation. As such it may integrate sustainability and innovation specific to caring for place.

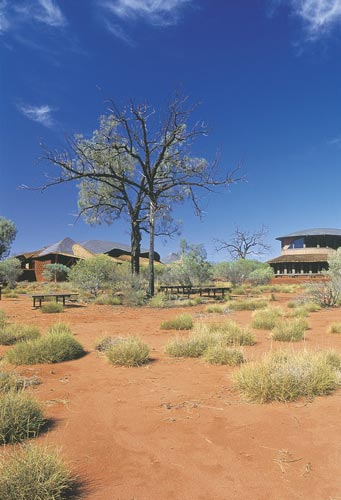
Uluru-Kata Tjuta Cultural Centre (Architect: Gregory Burgess)

Notable Projects include:

- Brambuk Cultural Centre (Halls Gap//Budja Budja, Grampians National Park Victoria)
- Marika Alderton House (Yirrkala, Northern Territory)
- Uluru-Kata Tjuta Cultural Centre (Uluru, Northern Territory)
- Wilcannnia Health Service (Wilcannia, New South Wales)
- Birabahn Aboriginal & Torres Strait Islander Centre, University of Newcastle, NSW
- Girrawaa Creative Works Centre (Bathurst, New South Wales)
- Achimbun Interpretive and Visitor Information Centre, (Weipa, Queensland)
- Tjulyuru Ngaanyatjarri Cultural and Civic Centre (Warburton, Western Australia)
- Port Augusta Courts Complex (Port Augusta, South Australia)
- Kurongkurl Katitjin Centre for Indigenous Australian Education and Research (Edith Cowan University, Perth, Western Australia)
- Aboriginal Dance Theatre Redfern (Redfern, Sydney)
- Nyinkka-Nyunyu Art and Culture Centre (Tennant Creek, Northern Territory)
- Karijini National Park Visitors Centre (Pilbara, Western Australia)
- West Kimberley Regional Prison (Derby, Western Australia)
- Djakanimba Pavilions, (Wugularr or Beswick, North Territory)
- Walumba Elders Centre (Warrmarn, Western Australia)

Indigenous architecture of the 21st century has been enhanced by university-trained Indigenous architects, landscape architects, and other design professionals who have incorporated different aspects of traditional Indigenous cultural references and symbolism, fused architecture with ethnoarchitectural styles and pursued various approaches to the questions of identity and architecture.

=== Prominent Aboriginal and/or Torres Strait Islander Practitioners ===
- Sarah Lynn Rees (Palawa)
- Danièle Hromek (Budawang/Yuin)
- Francoise Lane
- Siân Hromek (Budawang/Yuin)
- Linda Kennedy (Yuin)
- Rueben Berg
- Jefa Greenaway
- Dillon Kombumerri
- Andrew Lane
- Michael Hromek (Budawang/Yuin)
- Kevin O'Brien
- Craig Kerslake (Wiradjuri)

=== Prominent researchers ===
- Danièle Hromek (Budawang/Yuin)
- Carroll Go-Sam (Dyirrbal gumbilbara)
- Elizabeth Grant
- Paul Memmott
- Timothy O'Rourke
- Paul Pholeros
- Helen Ross

=== Indigenous design methodology ===
Drawing on their heritage, Indigenous designers, architects and built environment professionals from Australia often use a Country-centred design methodology, also referred to as "Country centric design", "Country-led design", "privileging Country in design", and Designing with Country. This methodology centres around the Indigenous experience of Country (capital C) and has been developed and used by generations of Indigenous peoples in Australia.

== Canada ==
=== Canadian traditional architecture ===
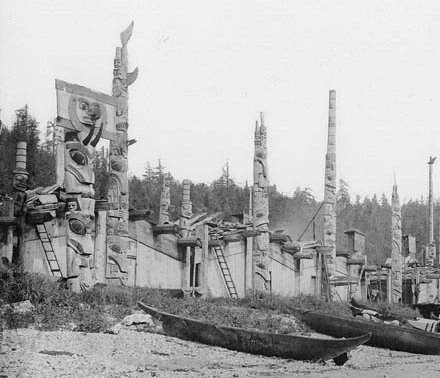
A group of Haida longhouses

The original Indigenous people of Canada developed complex building traditions thousands of years before the arrival of the first Europeans. Canada contained five broad cultural regions, defined by common climatic, geographical and ecological characteristics. Each region gave rise to distinctive building forms which reflected these conditions, as well as the available building materials, means of livelihood, and social and spiritual values of the resident peoples.

A striking feature of traditional Canadian architecture was the consistent integrity between structural forms and cultural values. The wigwam, (otherwise known as wickiup or wetu), tipi, and snow house were building forms perfectly suited to their environments and to the requirements of mobile hunting and gathering cultures. The longhouse, pit house and plank house were diverse responses to the need for more permanent building forms.

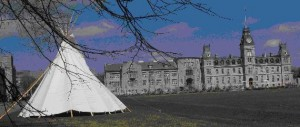
Tipi outside the Royal Military College of Canada

The semi-nomadic peoples of the Maritimes, Quebec, and Northern Ontario, such as the Mi'kmaq, Cree, and Algonquin generally lived in wigwams '. The wood-framed structures, covered with an outer layer of bark, reeds, or woven mats; usually in a cone shape, although sometimes a dome. The groups changed locations every few weeks or months. They would take the outer layer of the structure with them, and leave the heavy wood frame in place. The frame could be reused if the group returned to the location at a later date.

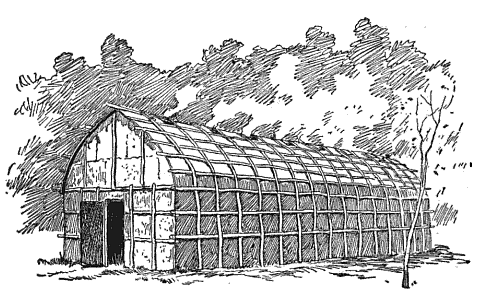
A traditional Iroquois longhouse.

Further south, in what is today Southern Ontario and Quebec the Iroquois society lived in permanent agricultural settlements holding several hundred to several thousand people. The standard form of housing was the long house. These were large structures, several times longer than they were wide holding a large number of people. They were built with a frame of saplings or branches, covered with a layer of bark or woven mats.

On the Canadian Prairies the standard form of life was a nomadic one, with the people often moving to a new location each day to follow the bison herds. Housing thus had to be portable, and the tipi was developed. The tipi consisted of a thin wooden frame and an outer covering of animal hides. The structures could be quickly erected, and were light enough to transport long distances.

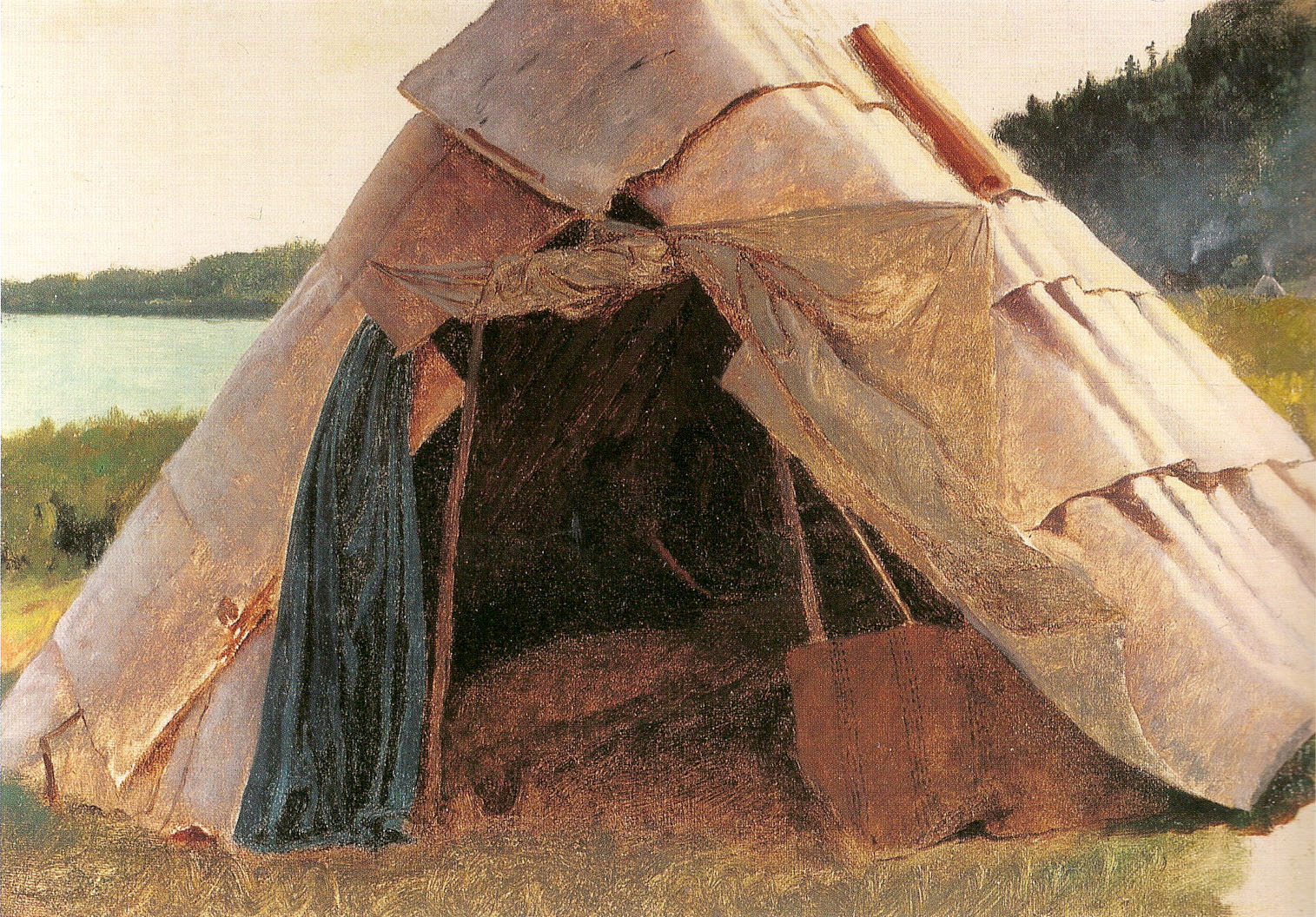
Details of Ojibwe Wigwam at Grand Portage by Eastman Johnson

In the Interior of British Columbia the standard form of home was the semi-permanent pit house, thousands of relics of which, known as quiggly holes are scattered across the Interior landscape. These were structures shaped like an upturned bowl, placed on top of a 3-or-4-foot-deep (0.91 or 1.22 m) pit. The bowl, made of wood, would be covered with an insulating layer of earth. The house would be entered by climbing down a ladder at the centre of the roof.

Some of the best architectural designs were made by settled people along the North American west coast. People like the Haida used advanced carpentry and joinery skills to construct large houses of red cedar planks. These were large square, solidly built houses. One advanced design was the six beam house, named for the number of beams that supported the roof, where the front of each house would be decorated with a heraldric pole that would be sometimes be brightly painted with artistic designs.

In the far north, where wood was scarce and solid shelter essential for survival, several unique and innovative architectural styles were developed. One of the most famous is the igloo, a domed structure made of snow, which was quite warm. In the summer months, when the igloos melted, tents made of seal skin, or other hides, were used. The Thule adopted a design similar to the pit houses of the BC interior, but because of the lack of wood they instead used whale bones for the frame.

In addition to meeting the primary need for shelter, structures functioned as integral expressions of their occupants' spiritual beliefs and cultural values. In all five regions, dwellings performed dual roles – providing both shelter and a tangible means of linking mankind with the universe. Building-forms were often seen as metaphorical models of the cosmos, and as such they frequently assumed powerful spiritual qualities which helped define the cultural identity of the group.

The sweat lodge is a hut, typically dome-shaped and made with natural materials, used by Indigenous peoples of the Americas for ceremonial steam baths and prayer. There are several styles of structures used in different cultures; these include a domed or oblong hut similar to a wickiup, a permanent structure made of wood and earth, or even a simple hole dug into the ground and covered with planks or tree trunks. Stones are typically heated and then water poured over them to create steam. In ceremonial usage, these ritual actions are accompanied by traditional prayers and songs.

=== Issues with Indigenous housing in Canada ===
As many more settlers arrived in Canada, Indigenous peoples were strongly motivated to relocate to newly created reserves, where the Canadian government encouraged Indigenous people to build permanent houses and adopt farming in place of their traditional hunting and trapping. Not familiar to this sedentary lifestyle, many of these people continued to using their traditional hunting grounds, but when much of southern Canada was settled in the late 1800s and early 1900s, this practice ceased ending their nomadic way of life. After World War II, Indigenous people were relative non-participants in the housing and economic boom Canada. Most remained on remote rural reserves often in crowded dwellings that mostly lacked basic amenities. As health services on Indigenous reserves increased during the 1950s and 1960s, life expectancy greatly improved including dramatic drop in the infant mortality, though this may have exacerbated the existing overcrowding problem.

Since the 1960s the living conditions in on-reserve housing in Canada have not improved significantly. Overcrowding remains a serious problem in many communities. Many houses are in serious need of repair and others still lack basic amenities. Poor conditions of housing on reservations has contributed to many Indigenous people leaving reserves and migrating to urban areas of Canada, causing issues with homelessness, child poverty, tenancy, and transience.

=== Contemporary Indigenous Canadian architecture ===
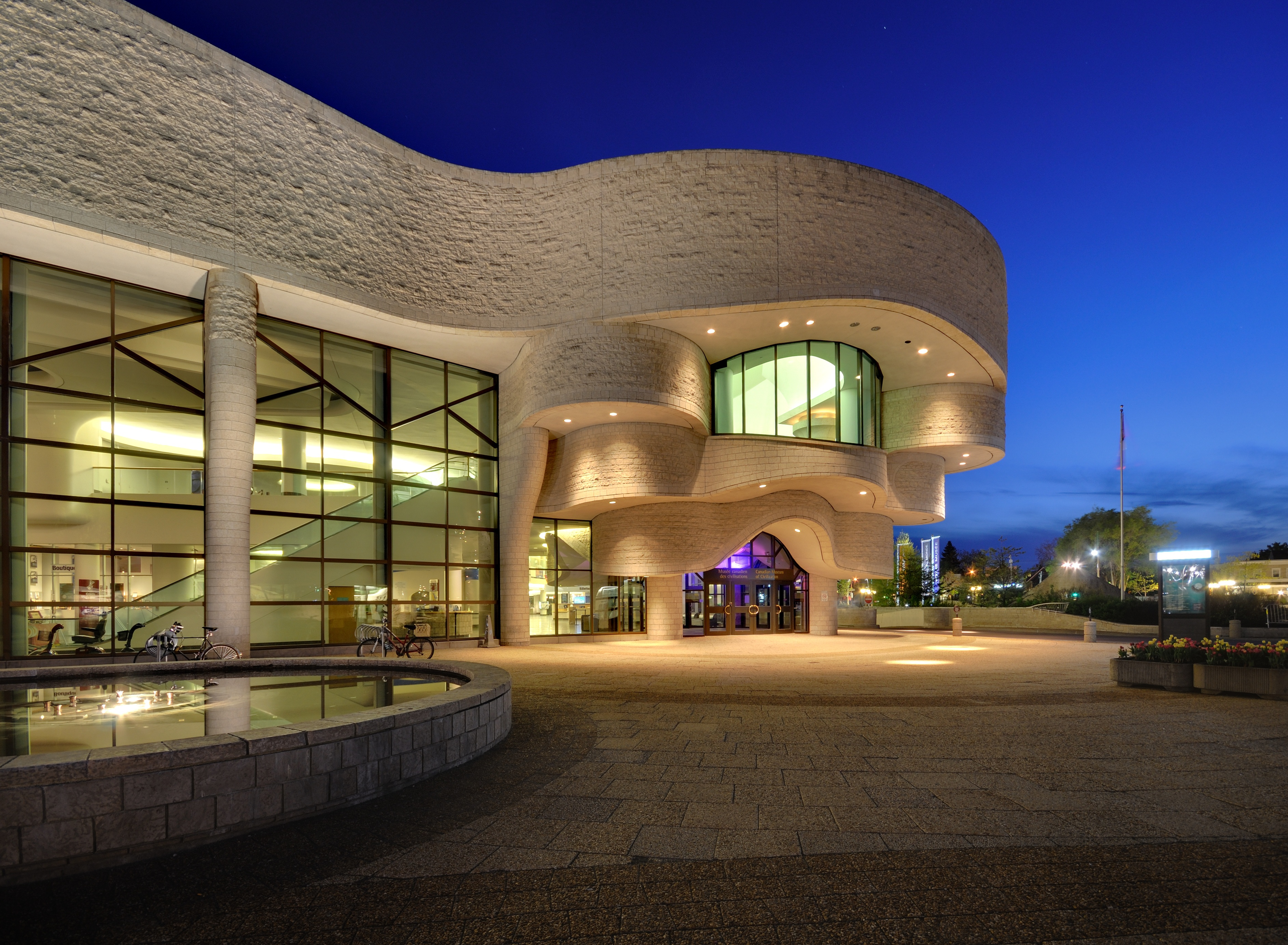
Museum of Civilisation – The entrance to the Public Wing, evocative of a turtle head, native symbol of Mother Earth, with the entrance plaza along Laurier Avenue.

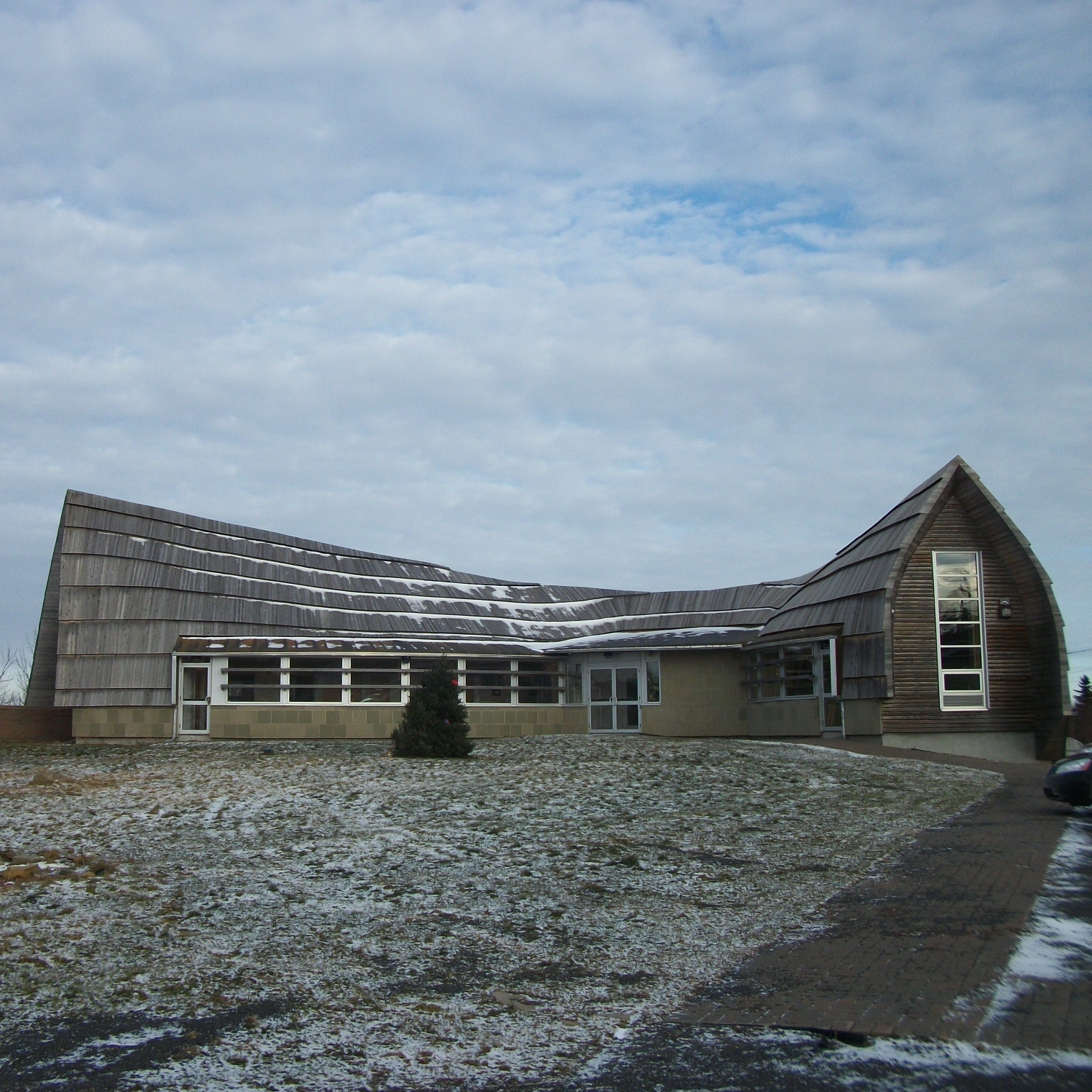
The Pictou Landing Health Centre takes its inspiration from long houses and traditional methods of construction

Notable projects include:

- First Nations Longhouse (University of British Columbia Vancouver)
- MacOdrum Library, (Carleton University), (Ottawa, Ontario)
- The Canadian Museum of History (French: Musée canadien de l'histoire,(Gatineau, Quebec).
- The Spirit Garden, (Prince Arthur's Landing, Thunder Bay, Ontario)
- First Nations University, (Regina, Saskatchewan)
- Aboriginal Gathering Place Pavilion (Capilano University, Vancouver, British Columbia)
- Squamish Lil'wat Cultural Centre
- Hôtel-Musée Premières Nations (Wendake Québec)
- Precious Blood Roman Catholic Church (Winnipeg)

=== Prominent practitioners ===
- Douglas Cardinal
- Patrick Stewart
- Alfred Waugh
- Brian Porter
- Étienne Gaboury

=== Prominent researchers ===
- Wanda Dalla Costa. With almost 20 years of experience as an Indigenous architect in North America, Wanda Dalla Costa was the first First Nations woman to become a Canadian architect. She was inspired to become an architect after traveling the world and seeing countless Indigenous tribes living in unoriginal, generic houses. She strives to help Indigenous communities highlight their unique traditions through architectural practices. She owns Redquill Architecture, based in Arizona. She is also a member of the American Indian Council of Architects & Engineers (AICAE) and the American Indian Science & Engineering Society (AISES).
- David Fortin, Laurentian University, first Indigenous Director of a school of architecture in Canada
- Ryan Walker

=== Prominent advocates ===
- Reanna Merasty

== Fiji ==
=== Traditional architecture (ethno-architecture) of Fiji ===
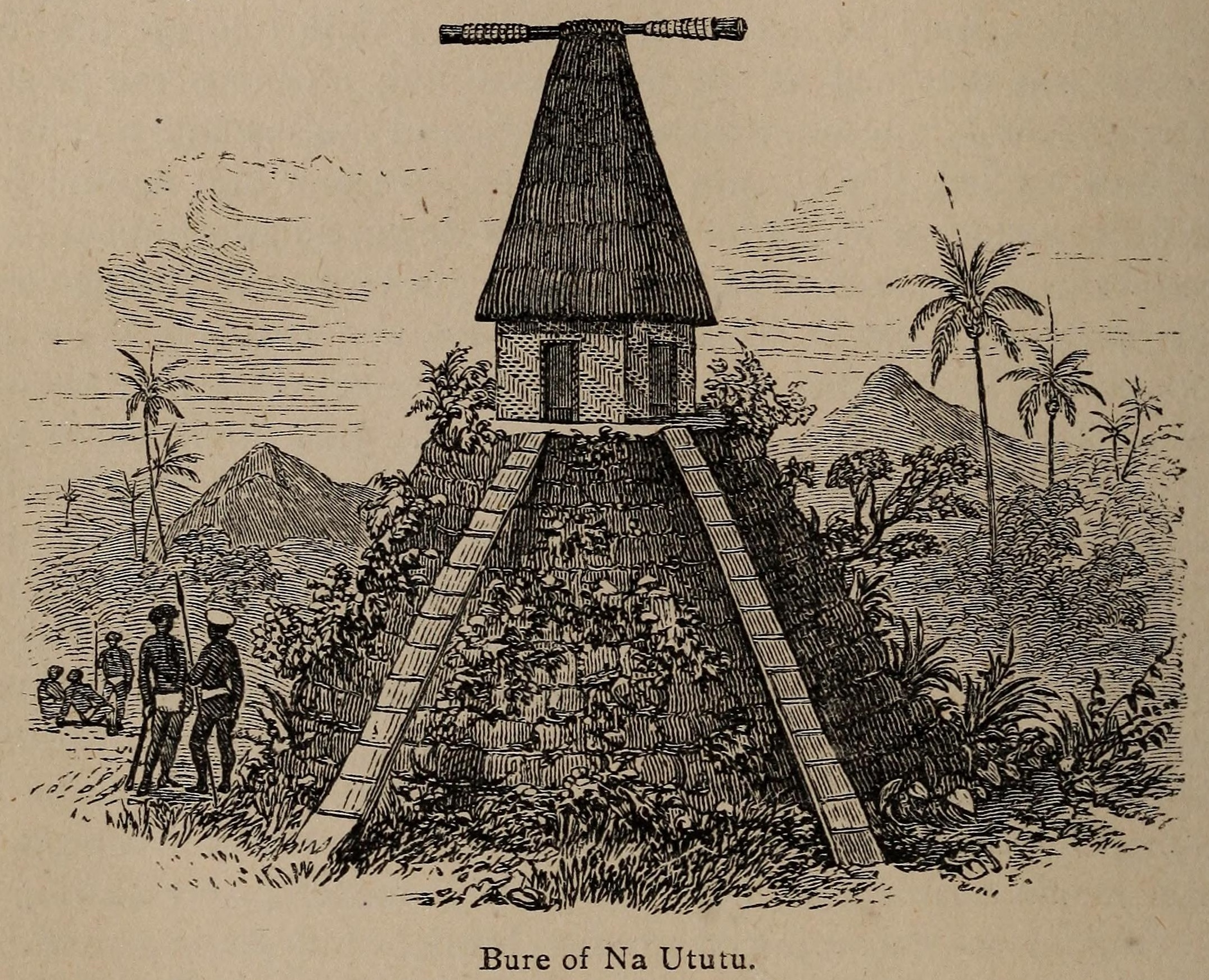
A bure kalou, a sketch done in the early 1800s.

In Old Fiji, the architecture of villages was simple and practical to meet the physical and social need and to provide communal safety. The houses were square in shape and with pyramid like shaped roofs, and the walls and roof were thatched and various plants of practical use were planted nearby, each village having a meeting house and a Spirit house. The spirit house was elevated on a pyramid like base built with large stones and earth, again a square building with an elongated pyramid like roof with various scented flora planted nearby.

The houses of Chiefs were of similar design and would be set higher than his subjects houses but instead of an elongated roof would have similar roof to those of his subjects homes but of course on a larger scale.

=== Contemporary architecture in Fiji ===
With the introduction of communities from Asia aspects of their cultural architecture are now evident in urban and rural areas of Fiji's two main Islands Viti Levu and Vanua Levu. A village structure shares similarities today but built with modern materials and spirit houses (Bure Kalou) have been replaced by churches of varying design.

The urban landscape of early Colonial Fiji was reminiscent of most British colonies of the 19th and 20th century in tropical regions of the world, while some of this architecture remains, the urban landscape is evolving in leaps and bounds with various modern aspects of architecture and design becoming more and more evident in the business, industrial and domestic sector, the rural areas are evolving at a much slower rate.

== New Caledonia (Kanaky) ==
=== Kanak traditional architecture ===
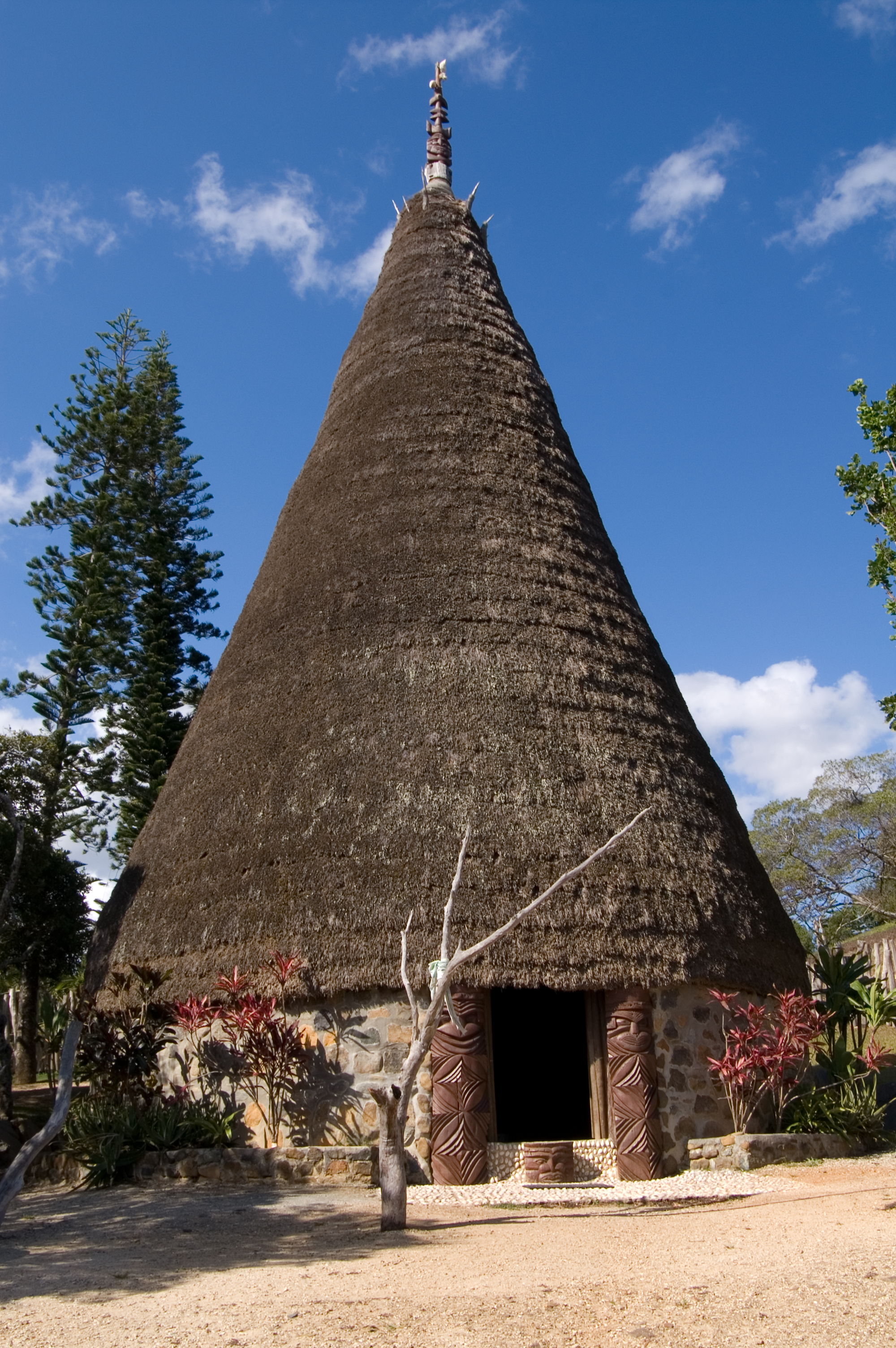
La Grande Case (Chief's Hut) at the Jean-Marie Tjibaou Cultural Centre, Nouméa, New Caledonia.

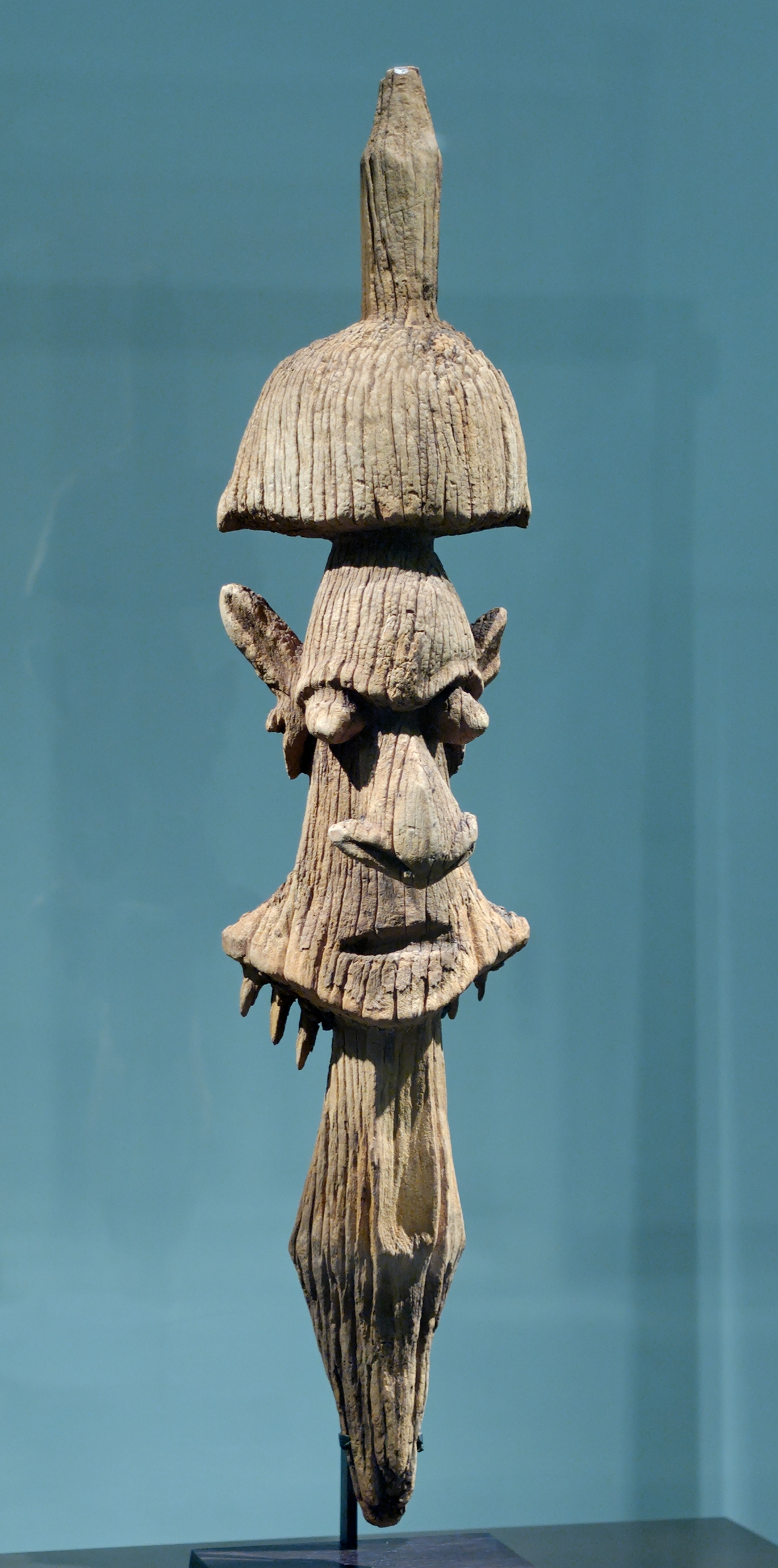
Fragment of a flèche faîtière of a La Grande Case made of houp wood, 18th century

Kanak cultures developed in the New Caledonia archipelago over a period of three thousand years. Today, France governs New Caledonia but has not developed a national culture. The Kanak claim for independence is upheld by a culture thought of as national by the Indigenous population. Kanaks have settled over all the islands officially indicated by France as New Caledonia and Dependencies. The archipelago includes the principal island, Grande Terre, Belep Islands to the north and Isle of Pines to the south. It is bordered on the east by the Loyalty Islands, consisting of three coral atolls (Mare, Lifou, and Ouvea).

Kanak society is organised around clans, which are both social and spatial units. The clan could initially be made up of people related through a common ancestor, comprising several families. There can be between fifty and several hundred people in a clan. This basic definition of the clan has become modified over the years due to historical situations and places involving wars, disagreements, new arrivals etc. The clan structure, therefore, evolved as new people arrived and were given a place and a role in the social organisation of the clan, or through clan members leaving to join other clans.

Traditionally a village is set up in the following manner. The Chief's hut (called La Grande Case) lies at the end of a long and wide central walkway which is used for gathering and performing ceremonies. The Chief's younger brother lives in a hut at the other end. The rest of the village lives in huts along the central walkway, which is lined with auracarias or palms. Trees lined the alleys which were used as shady gathering places. For Kanak people, space is divided between premises reserved for important men and other residences placed closer to the women and children. Kanak people generally avoided being alone in empty spaces.

The inside of a Grande Case is dominated by the central pole (made out of houp wood), which holds up the roof and the rooftop spear, the flèche faîtière. Along the walls are various posts which are carved to represent ancestors. The door is flanked by two carved door posts (called Katana), who were the "sentinels who reported the arrival of strangers". There also is a carved door step. The rooftop spear has three main parts: the spear facing up, which prevents bad spirits coming down onto ancestor. The face, which represents the ancestor. The spear on the bottom which keep bad spirits coming up to ancestor.

The flèche faîtière or a carved rooftop spear, spire or finial is the home of ancestral spirits and is characterized by three major components. The ancestor is symbolized by a flat, crowned face in the centre of the spear. The ancestor's voice is symbolized by a long, rounded pole that is run through by conch shells. The symbolic connection of the clan, through the chief, is a base, which is planted into the case's central pole. Sharply pointed wood pieces fan out from either end of the central area, symbolically preventing bad spirits from being able to reach the ancestor. It evokes, beyond a particular ancestor, the community of ancestors. and represents the ancestral spirits, symbolic of transition between the world of the dead and the world of the living.

The arrow or the spear normally has a needle at the end to insert threaded shells from bottom to top; one of the shells contains arrangements to ensure protection of the house and the country. During wars enemies attacked this symbolic finial. After the death of a Kanak chief, the flèche faîtière is removed and his family takes it to their home. Though it is allowed to be used again, as a sign of respect, it is normally kept at burial grounds of noted citizens or at the mounds of abandoned grand houses.

The form of the buildings varied from island to island, but were generally round in plan and conical in the vertical elevation. The traditional hut features represent the organization and lifestyle of the occupants. The hut is the endogenous Kanak architectural element and built entirely of plant material taken from the surrounding forest reserve. Consequently, from one area to another, the materials used are different. Inside the hut, a hearth is built on the floor between the entrance and the centre pole that defines a collective living space covered with pandanus leaf (ixoe) woven mats, and a mattress of coconut leaves (behno). The round hut is the translation of physical and material into Kanak cultures and social relations within the clan.

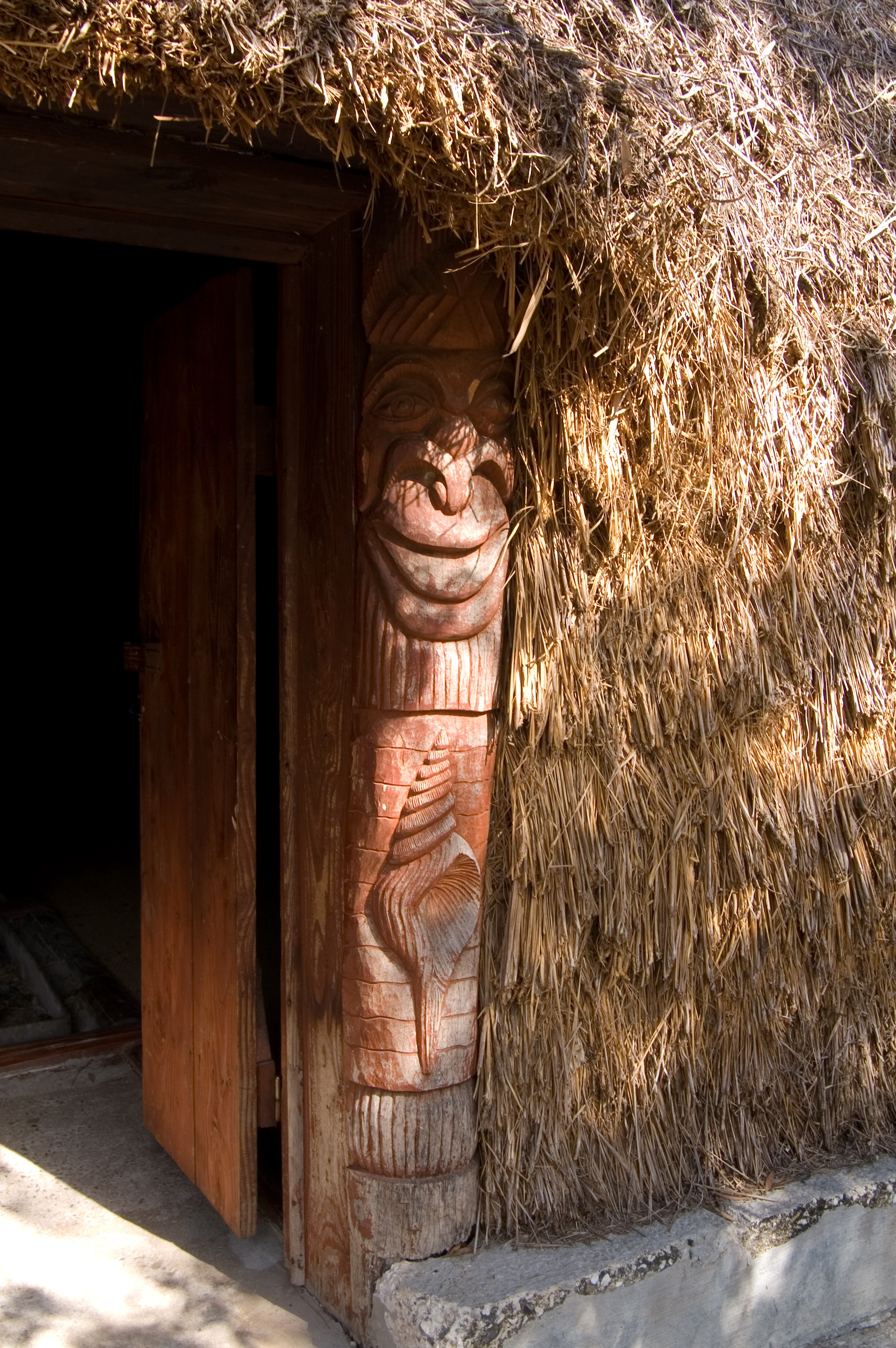
Detail of carved door posts (Katana)

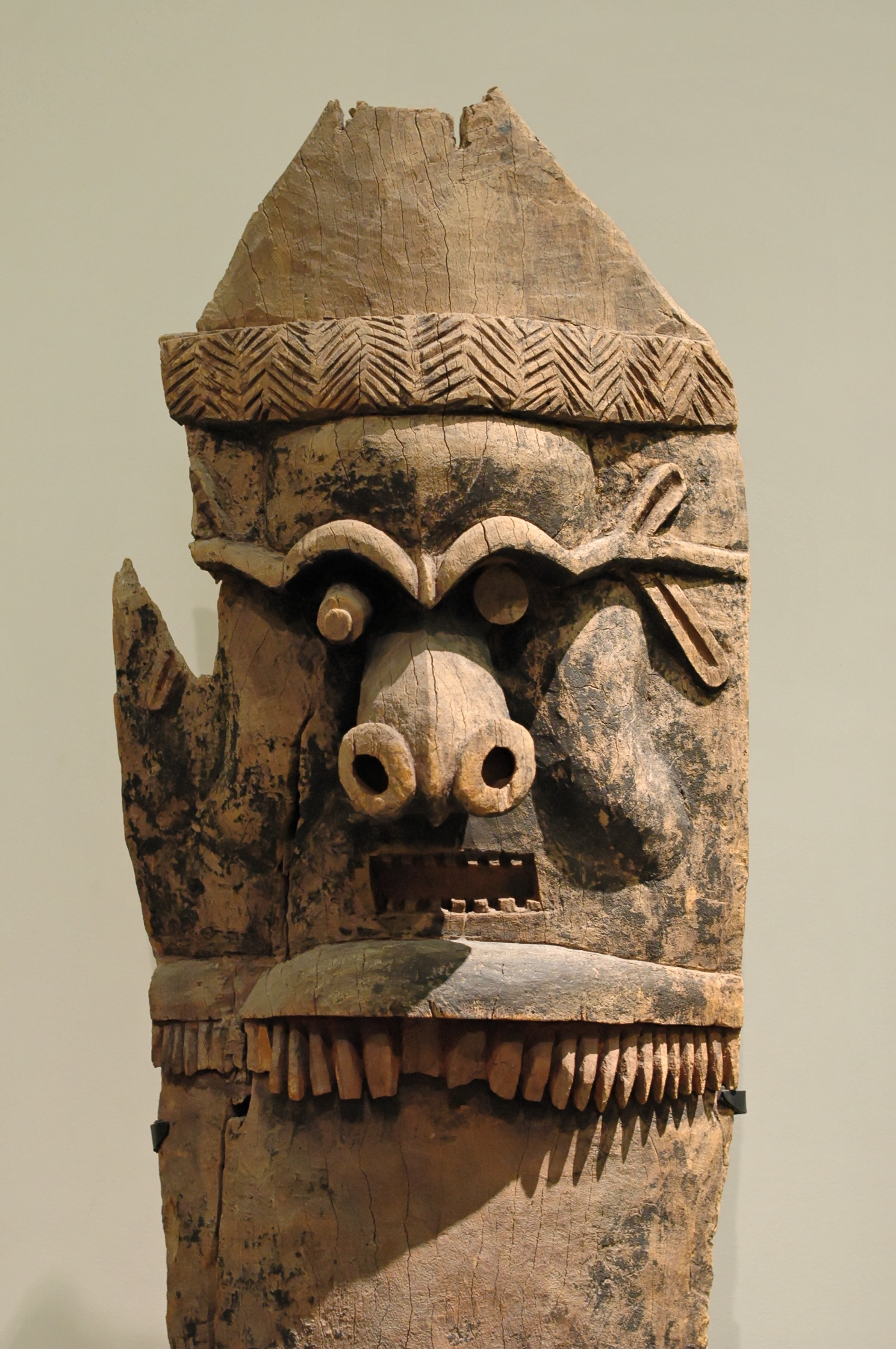
Detail of carved door posts (Katana)

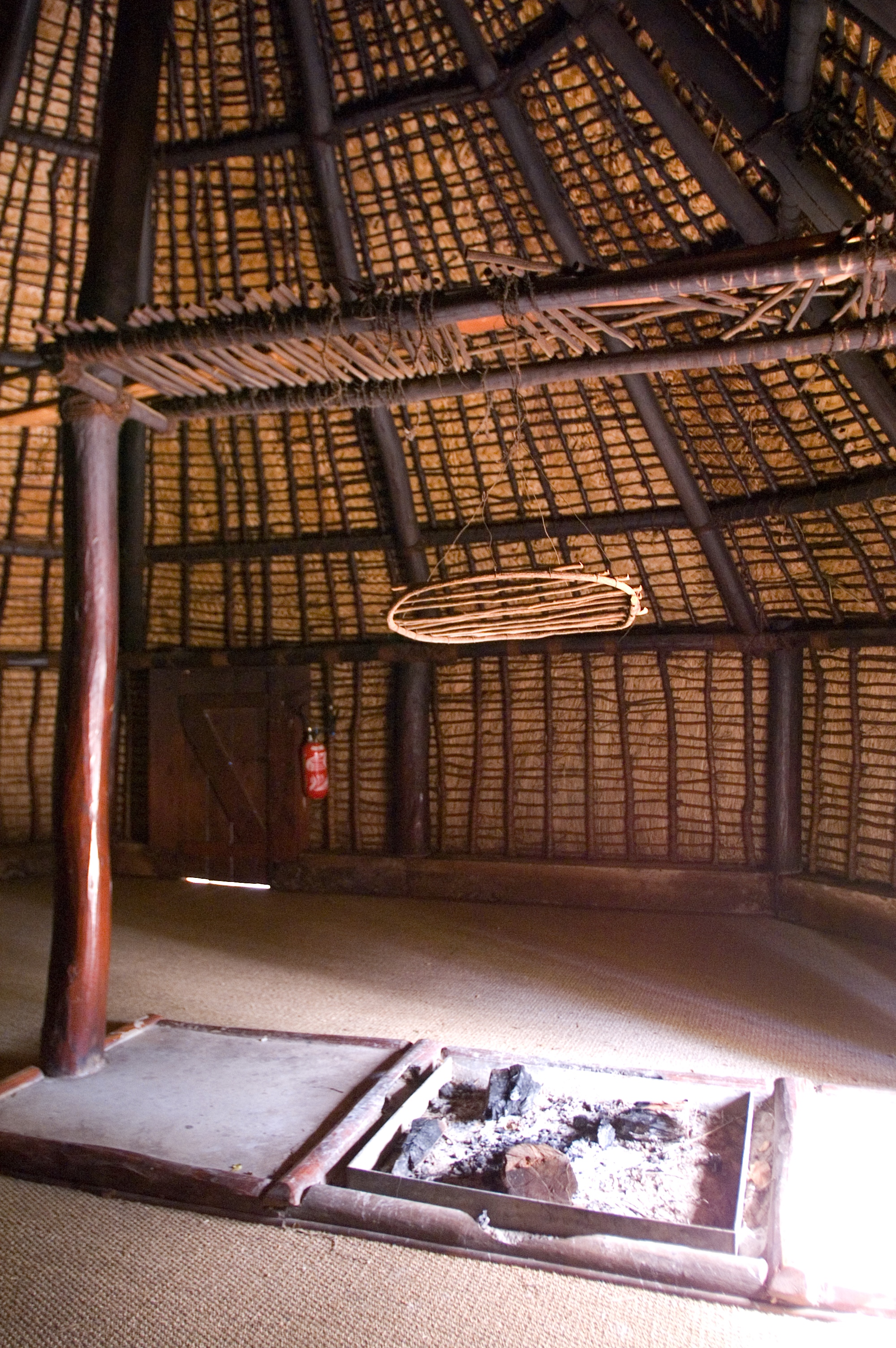
Interior view of hut with a hearth

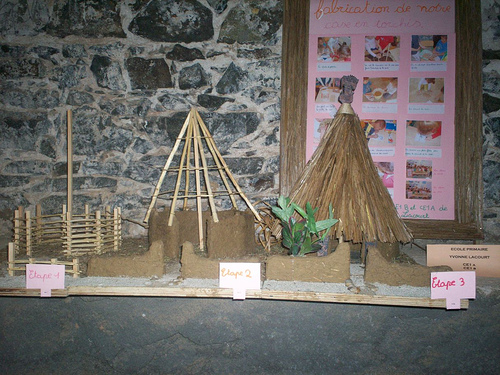
Exhibit of the various stages of construction of a Kanak hut

=== Kanak contemporary architecture ===
Contemporary Kanak society has several layers of customary authority, from the 4,000–5,000 family-based clans to the eight customary areas (aires coutumières) that make up the territory. Clans are led by clan chiefs and constitute 341 tribes, each headed by a tribal chief. The tribes are further grouped into 57 customary chiefdoms (chefferies), each headed by a head chief, and forming the administrative subdivisions of the customary areas.

The Jean-Marie Tjibaou Cultural Centre (French: Centre Culturel Tjibaou) designed by Italian architect Renzo Piano and opened in 1998 is the icon of the Kanak culture and contemporary Kanak architecture.

Jean-Marie Tjibaou Cultural Centre in Nouméa

The Centre was constructed on the narrow Tinu Peninsula, approximately 8 kilometres (5.0 mi) northeast of the centre of Nouméa, the capital of New Caledonia, celebrates the vernacular Kanak culture, amidst much political controversy over the independent status sought by Kanaks from French rule. It was named after Jean-Marie Tjibaou, the leader of the independence movement who was assassinated in 1989 and who had a vision of establishing a cultural centre which blended the linguistic and artistic heritage of the Kanak people.

The Kanak building traditions and the resources of modern international architecture were blended by Piano. The formal curved axial layout, 250 metres (820 ft) long on the top of the ridge, contains ten large conical cases or pavilions (all of different dimensions) patterned on the traditional Kanak Grand Hut design. The building is surrounded by landscaping which is also inspired by traditional Kanak design elements. Marie Claude Tjibaou, widow of Jean Marie Tjibaou and current leader of the Agency for the Development of Kanak Culture (ADCK), observed: "We, the Kanaks, see it as a culmination of a long struggle for the recognition of our identity; on the French Government's part it is a powerful gesture of restitution."

The building plans, spread over an area of 8,550 square metres (92,000 sq ft) of the museum, were conceived to incorporate the link between the landscape and the built structures in the Kanak traditions. The people had been removed from their natural landscape and habitat of mountains and valleys and any plan proposed for the art centre had to reflect this aspect. Thus, the planning aimed at a unique building which would be, as the architect Piano stated, "to create a symbol and ...a cultural centre devoted to Kanak civilization, the place that would represent them to foreigners that would pass on their memory to their grand children". The model as finally built evolved after much debate in organized 'Building Workshops' in which Piano's associate, Paul Vincent and Alban Bensa, an anthropologist of repute on Kanak culture were also involved.

The Kanak village planning principles placed the houses in groups with the Chief's house at the end of an open public alley formed by other buildings clustered along on both sides was adopted in the Cultural Centre planned by Piano and his associates. An important concept that evolved after deliberations in the 'building workshops, after Piano won the competition for building the art centre, also involved "landscaping ideas" to be created around each building. To this end, an interpretative landscape path was conceived and implemented around each building with series of vegetative cover avenues along the path that surrounded the building, but separated it from the lagoon. This landscape setting appealed to the Kanak people when the centre was inaugurated. Even the approach to the buildings from the paths catered to the local practices of walking for three quarters of the path to get to the entrance to the Cases. One critic of the building observed: "It was very intelligent to use the landscape to introduce the building. This is the way the Kanak people can understand".

The centre comprises an interconnected series of ten stylised grandes cases (chiefs' huts), which form three villages (covering an area of 6060 square metres). These huts have an exposed stainless-steel structure and are constructed of iroko, an African rot-resistant timber which has faded over time to reveal a silver patina evocative of the coconut palms that populate the coastline of New Caledonia. The Jean-Marie Tjibaou Cultural Centre draws materially and conceptually on its geopolitical environment, so that despite being situated on the outskirts of the capital city, it draws influence from the diverse Kanak communities residing elsewhere across Kanaky. The circling pathway that leads from the car park to the centre's entrance is lined with plants from various regions of Kanaky. Together, these represent the myth of the creation of the first human: the founding hero, Téâ Kanaké. Signifying the collaborative design process, the path and centre are organically interconnected so it is difficult to discern any discrete edges existing between the building and gardens. Similarly, the soaring huts appear unfinished as they open outward to the sky, projecting the architect's image of Kanak culture as flexible, diasporic, progressive and resistant to containment by traditional museological spaces.

Other important architectural projects have included the construction of the Mwâ Ka, 12m totem pole, topped by a grande case (chief's hut) complete with flèche faîtière standing in a landscaped square opposite Musée de Nouvelle-Calédonie. Mwâ Ka means the house of mankind – in other words, a house where discussions are held. Its carvings are divided into eight cylindrical sections representing the eight customary regions of New Caledonia. Mounted on a concrete double-hulled pirogue, the Mwâ Ka symbolises the mast but also the central post of a case. At the back of the pirogue a wooden helmsman steers the ever forwards. The square's flowerbed arrangements depicting stars and moons are symbolic of navigation. The Mwâ Ka was conceived by the Kanak community to commemorate 24 September, the anniversary of the French annexation of New Caledonia in 1853. Initially a day of mourning, the creation of the Mwâ Ka (inaugurated in 2005) symbolised the end of the mourning period thus giving the date a new significance. The erection of the Mwâ Ka was a way of burying past suffering related to French colonisation and turning a painful anniversary into a day for celebrating Kanak identity and the new multi-ethnic identity of Kanaky.

== New Zealand (Māori) ==
=== Traditional Māori architecture ===
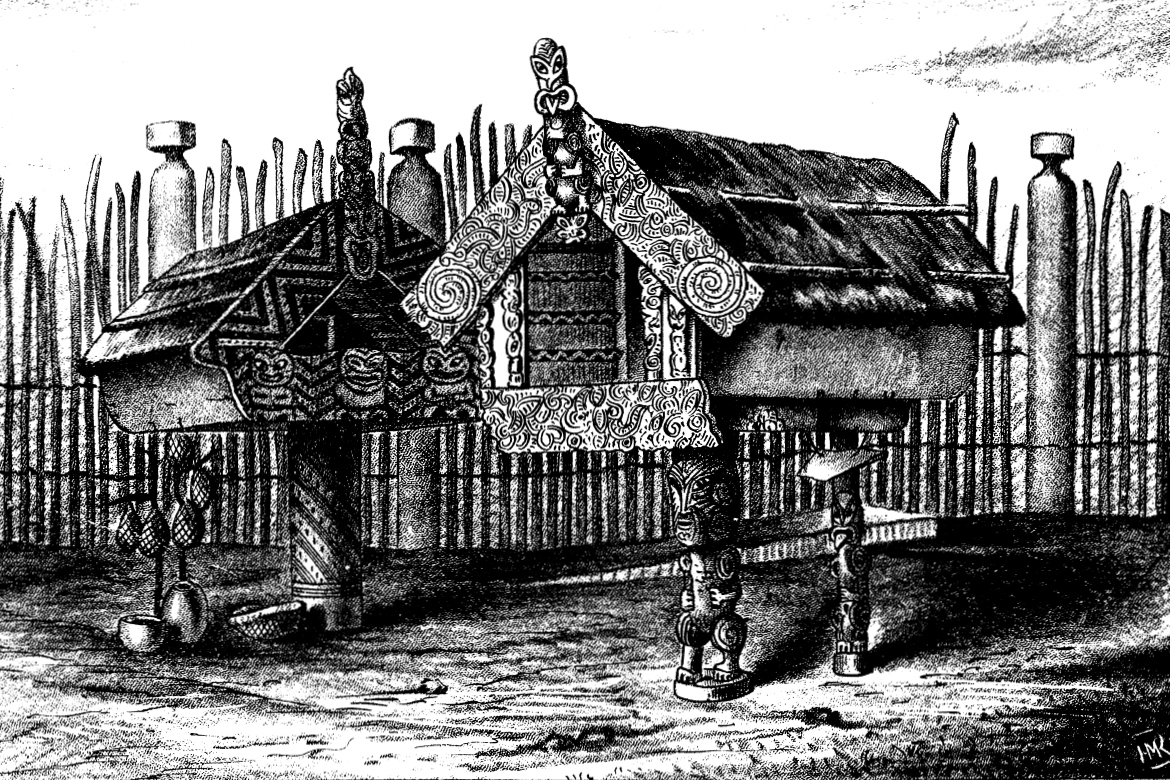
Pataka with tekoteko

The first known dwellings of the ancestors of Māori were based on houses from their Polynesian homelands (Māori ancestors migrated from eastern Polynesia to the New Zealand archipelago c.1400 AD. On arriving, the Polynesians found they needed warmth and protection from a climate markedly different from the warm and humid tropical Polynesian islands. They soon modified their construction techniques to suit the colder climate. Many traditional island building-techniques were retained, using new materials: raupo reed, toetoe grass, aka vines and native timbers: totara, pukatea, and manuka. Archaeological evidence suggests that the design of Moa-hunter sleeping houses in the very early years of settlement was similar to that of houses found in Tahiti and eastern Polynesia. These were rectangular, round, oval, or "boat-shaped" semi-permanent dwellings.

These buildings were semi-permanent, as people moved around looking for food sources. Houses had wooden frames covered in reeds or leaves, with mats on earth floors. To help people keep warm, houses were small, with low doors, earth insulation and a fire inside. The standard building in a Māori settlement was a simple sleeping whare puni (house/hut) about 2 metres x 3 metres with a low roof, an earth floor, no window and a single low doorway. Heating was provided by a small open fire in winter. There was no chimney. Materials used in construction varied between areas, but raupo reeds, flax and totara-bark shingles for the roof were common. Similar small whare, but with interior drains, were used to store kumara on sloping racks. Around the 15th century communities became bigger and more settled. People built wharepuni – sleeping houses with room for several families, and a front porch. Other buildings included pātaka (storehouses), sometimes decorated with carvings, and kāuta (cooking houses).

The classic phase of Māori culture (c.1350–1769) was characterized by a more developed tribal society expressing itself clearly in wood carving and architecture. The most spectacular building type was the whare-whakairo, or carved meeting house. This building was the focus of social and symbolic Maori assemblies, and made visible a long tribal history. The wall slabs depicted warriors, chiefs and explorers. The painted rafter patterns and tukutuku panels demonstrated the Māori love for land, forest and river. The whare-whakairo was a colourful synthesis of carved architecture, expressing reverence for ancestors and love of nature. In the classic period, a higher proportion of whare were located inside pā than was the case after contact with Europeans. The whare of a chief was similar but larger—often with full headroom in the centre, a small window and a partly enclosed front porch. In times of conflict the chief lived in a whare on the tihi (summit) of a hill pā. In colder areas, such as in the North Island central plateau, it was common for whare to be partly sunk into the ground for better insulation.

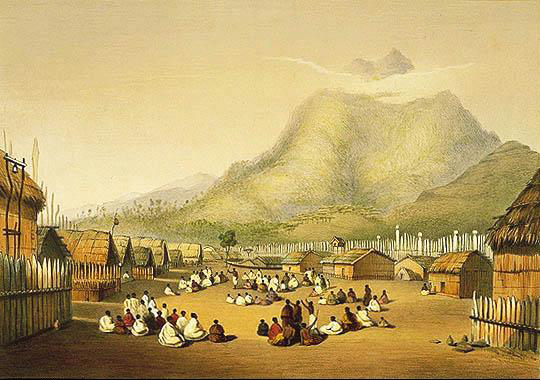
A marae at Kaitotehe, near Taupiri mountain, Waikato district, 1844. It was associated with Pōtatau Te Wherowhero, a chief who became the first Māori king.

Ngāti Porou ancestor, Ruatepupuke is said to have established the tradition of whare whakairo (carved meeting houses) on the East Coast. Whare whakairo are often named after ancestors and considered to embody that person. The house is seen as an outstretched body, and can be addressed like a living being. A wharenui (literally 'big house' alternatively known as meeting houses, whare rūnanga or whare whakairo (literally "carved house") is a communal house generally situated as the focal point of a marae. The present style of wharenui originated in the early to middle nineteenth century. The houses are often carved inside and out with stylised images of the iwi's ancestors, with the style used for the carvings varying from iwi to iwi. The houses always have names, sometimes the name of an ancestor or sometimes a figure from Māori mythology. While a meeting house is considered sacred, it is not a church or house of worship, but religious rituals may take place in front of or inside a meeting house. On most marae, no food may be taken into the meeting house.

Food was not cooked in the sleeping whare but in the open or under a kauta (lean-to). Saplings with branches and foliage removed were used to store and dry item such as fishing nets or cloaks. Valuable items were stored in pole-mounted storage shelters called pataka. Other constructions were large racks for drying split fish.

The marae was the central place of the village where culture can be celebrated and intertribal obligations can be met and customs can be explored and debated, where family occasions such as birthdays can be held, and where important ceremonies, such as welcoming visitors or farewelling the dead (tangihanga), can be performed.

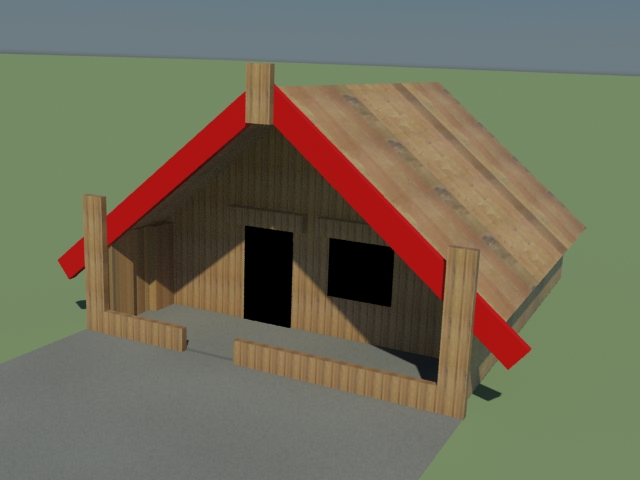
The position of the maihi shown in red

The building often symbolises an ancestor of the wharenui's tribe. So different parts of the building refer to body parts of that ancestor:

- the koruru at the point of the gable on the front of the wharenui can represent the ancestor's head. Compare finial.
- the maihi (the diagonal bargeboards) signify arms; the ends of the maihi are called raparapa, meaning "fingers"
- the tāhuhu (ridge beam) represents the backbone
- the heke or rafters signify ribs
- internally, the poutokomanawa (central column) can be interpreted as the heart

Other important components of the wharenui include:

- the amo, the vertical supports that hold up the ends of the maihi
- the poupou, or wall carving underneath the verandah
- the kūwaha or front door, along with the pare or door lintel
- the paepae, the horizontal element on the ground at the front of the wharenui, acts as the threshold of the building

=== Contemporary Māori architecture ===
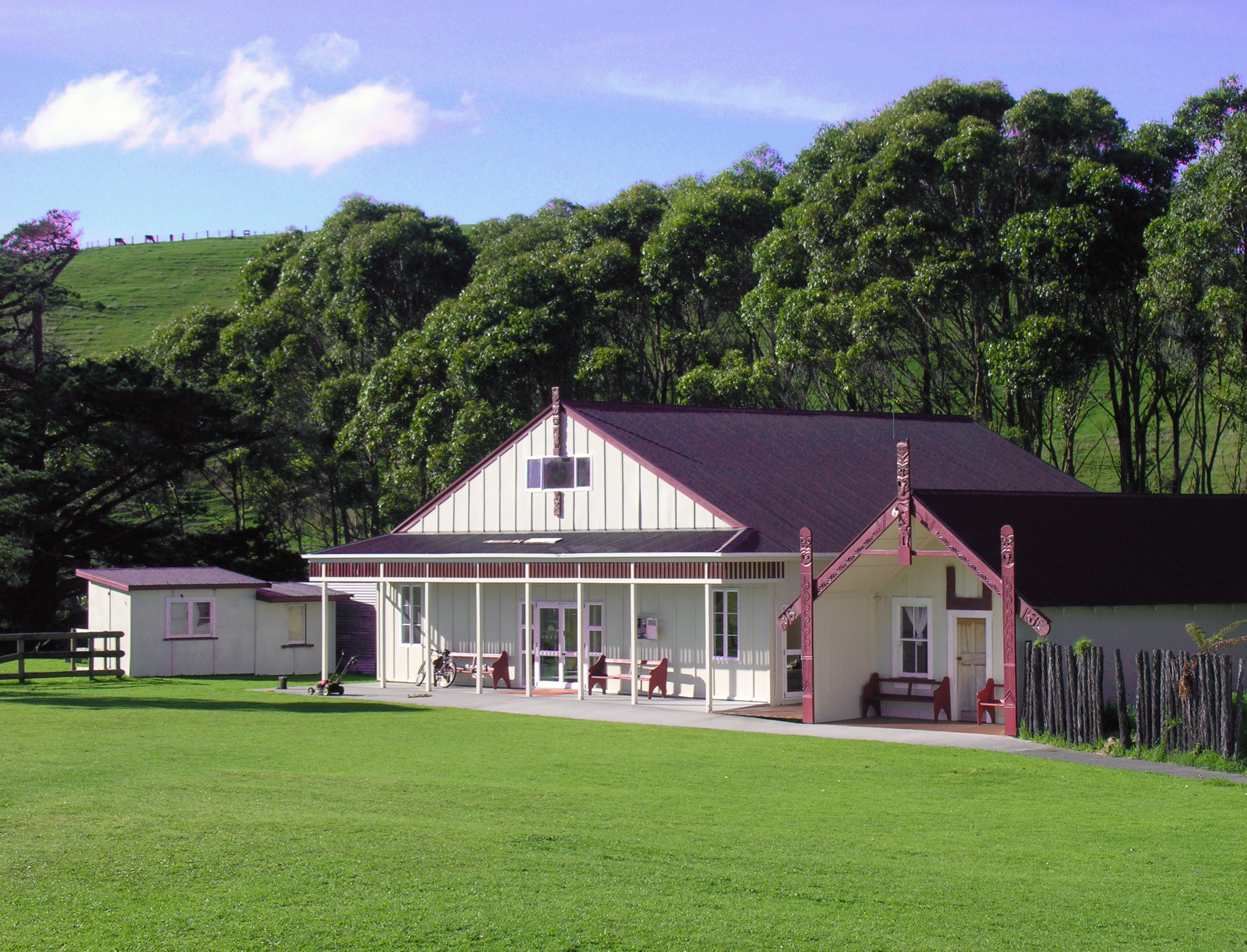
Whenuakura Marae in Taranaki. Marae continue to function as local community centres in contemporary Māori society.

Rau Hoskins defines Māori architecture as anything that involves a Māori client with a Māori focus. "I think traditionally Māori architecture has been confined to marae architecture and sometimes churches, and now Māori architecture manifests across all environments, so we have Māori immersion schools, Māori medical centres and health clinics, Māori tourism ventures, and papa kāinga or domestic Māori villages. So the opportunities that exist now are very diverse. The kaupapa (purpose or reason) for the building and client's aspirations are the key to how the architecture manifests."

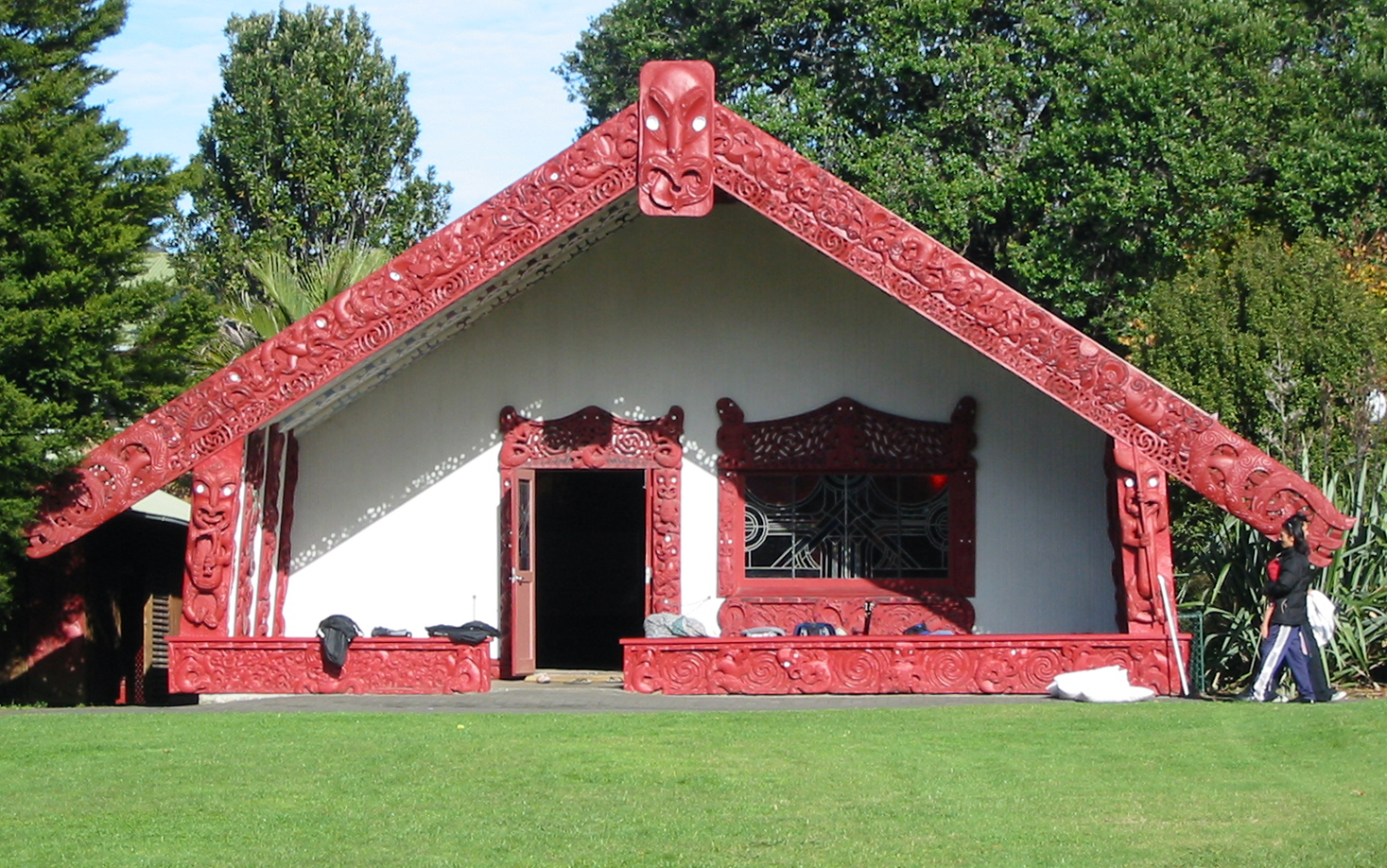
Tānenuiarangi, the wharenui at Waipapa marae, University of Auckland, New Zealand.

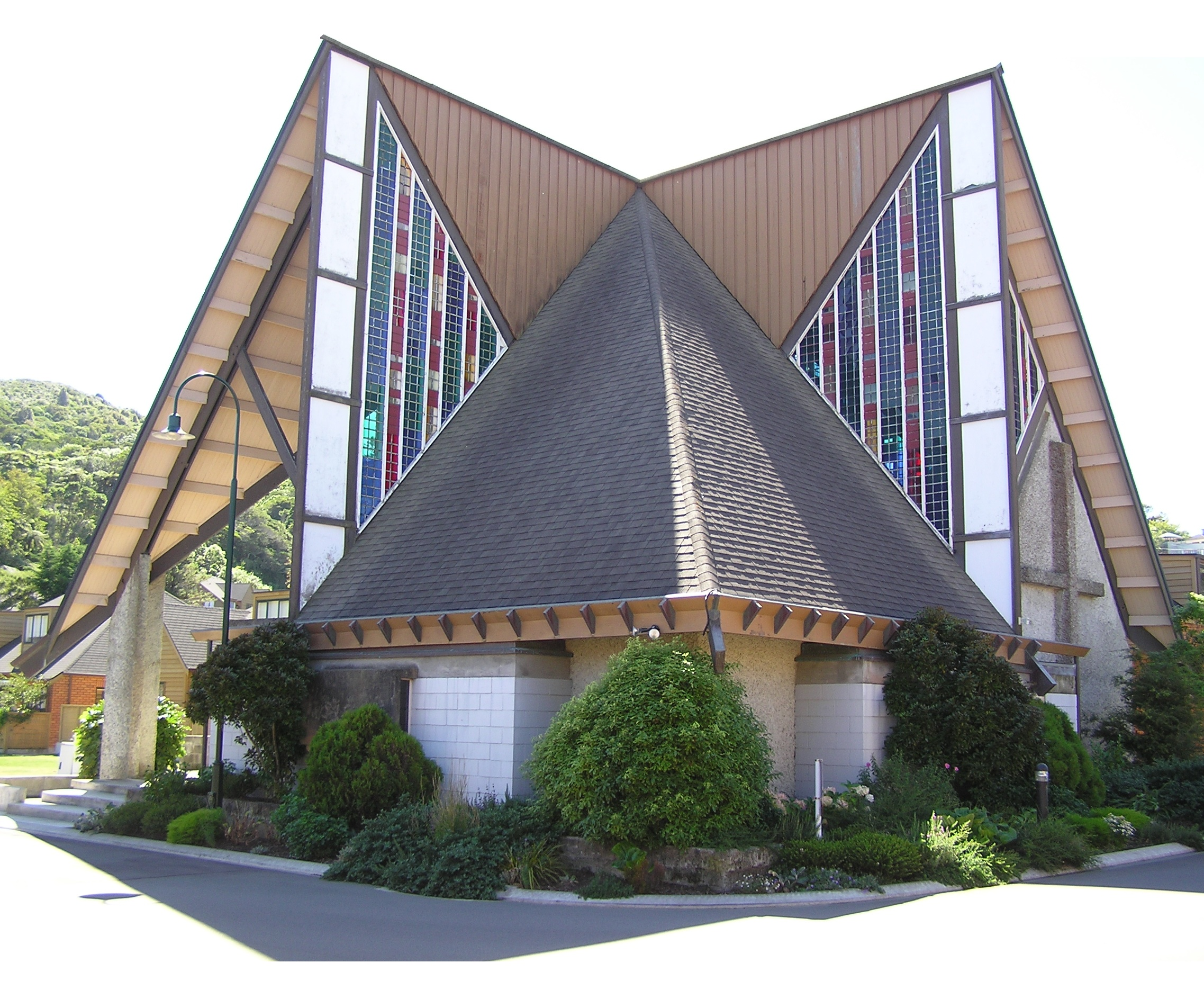
Futuna Chapel viewed from the south

From the 1960s, marae complexes were built in urban areas. In contemporary context these generally comprise a group of buildings around an open space, that frequently host events such as weddings, funerals, church services and other large gatherings, with traditional protocol and etiquette usually observed. They also serve as the base of one or sometimes several hapū. The marae is still wāhi tapu, a 'sacred place' which carries cultural meaning. They included buildings such as wharepaku (toilets) and whare ora (health centres). Meeting houses were still one large space with a porch and one door and window in front. In the 1980s marae began to be built in prisons, schools and universities.

Notable projects include:

- Tānenuiarangi, Wharenui at Waipapa Marae, (University of Auckland)
- Māori Studies facilities, UNITEC and Tairawhiti Polytechnic
- Ruapoutaka Marae, Glen Innes
- Ngäti Otara Marae and Te Rawheoro Marae (Tolaga Bay)
- Futuna Chapel (Karori, Wellington)

=== Prominent practitioners ===
- John Scott
- Rewi Thompson (Ngāti Porou and Ngāti Raukawa)
- Elisapeta Heta (Ngāti Wai)
- Keri Whaitiri, (Ngāti Kahungunu, Ngāi Tahu)
- Tere Insley (Te Whānau-ā-Apanui)
- Haley Hooper (Ngāpuhi)
- Jade Kake, (Ngāpuhi (Ngāti Hau me Te Parawhau), Te Whakatōhea, Te Arawa)
- Raukura Turei (Ngāitai ki Tamaki and Ngā Rauru ki Tahi)
- Amanda Yates (Ngāti Rangiwewehi, Ngāti Whakaue, Te Aitanga-a-Māhaki, Rongowhakaata)
- Jacqueline Paul (Ngāpuhi, Ngāti Tūwharetoa, Ngāti Kahungunu ki Heretaunga)
- Fleur Palmer (Te Rarawa, Te Aupouri)
- Rau Hoskins

=== Prominent researchers ===
- Elsdon Best
- Deidre Brown (Ngāpuhi, Ngāti Kahu )
- Fleur Palmer (Te Rarawa, Te Aupouri)

== Palau ==
=== Traditional architecture (ethno-architecture) of Palau ===
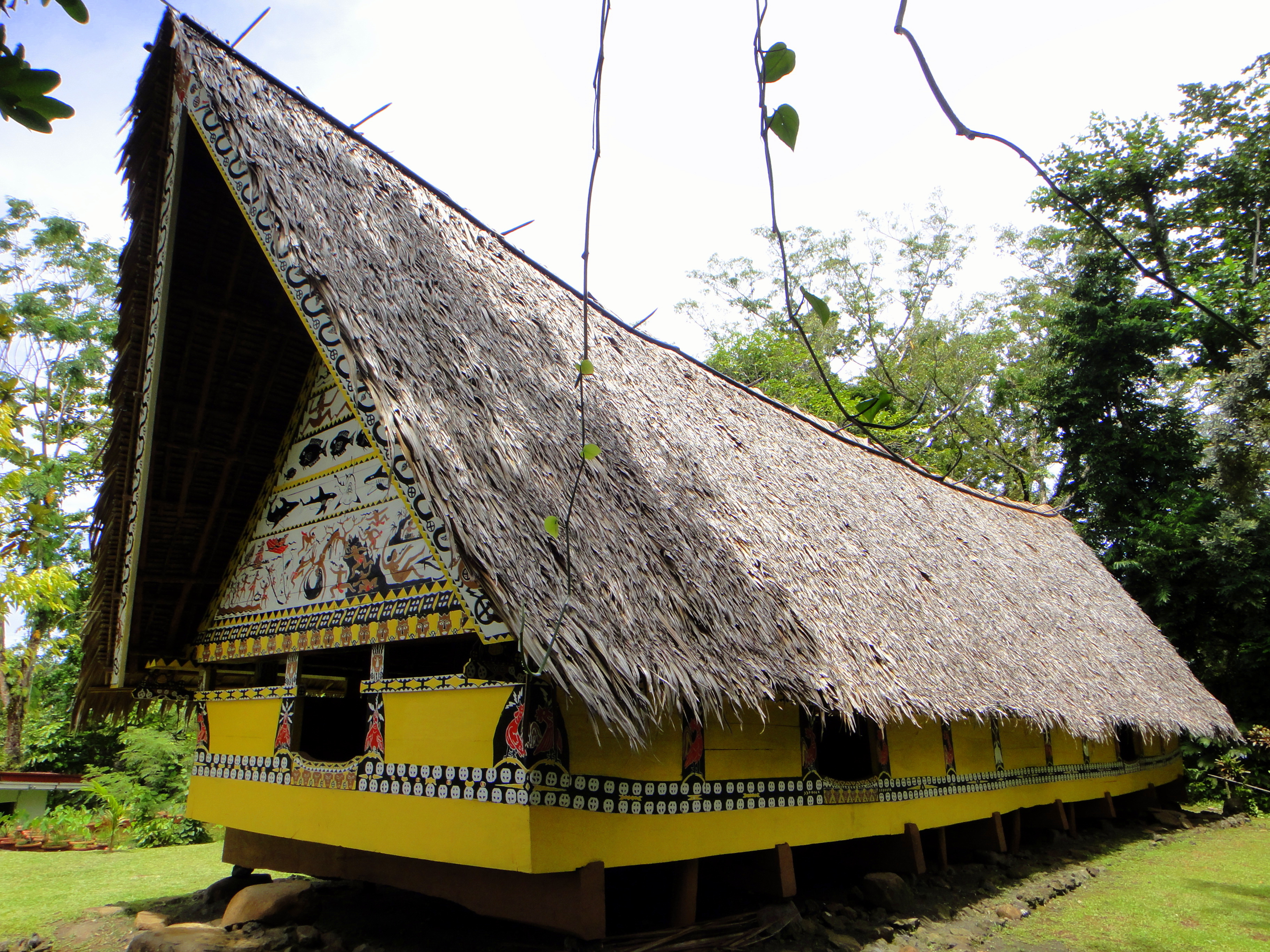
A bai in Belau National Museum, Koror

In Palau, there are many traditional meeting houses known as bais or abais. In ancient times every village in Palau had a bai as it was the most important building in a village. At the beginning of the 20th century, more than 100 bais were still in existence in Palau. In bais governing elders are assigned seats along the walls, according to rank and title. A bai has no dividing walls or furnishing and is decorated with depictions of Palauan legends. Palau's oldest bai is Airai Bai which is over 100 years old. Bais feature on the Seal of Palau and the flag of Koror.

== Philippines ==
=== Traditional architecture (ethno-architecture) of the Philippines ===
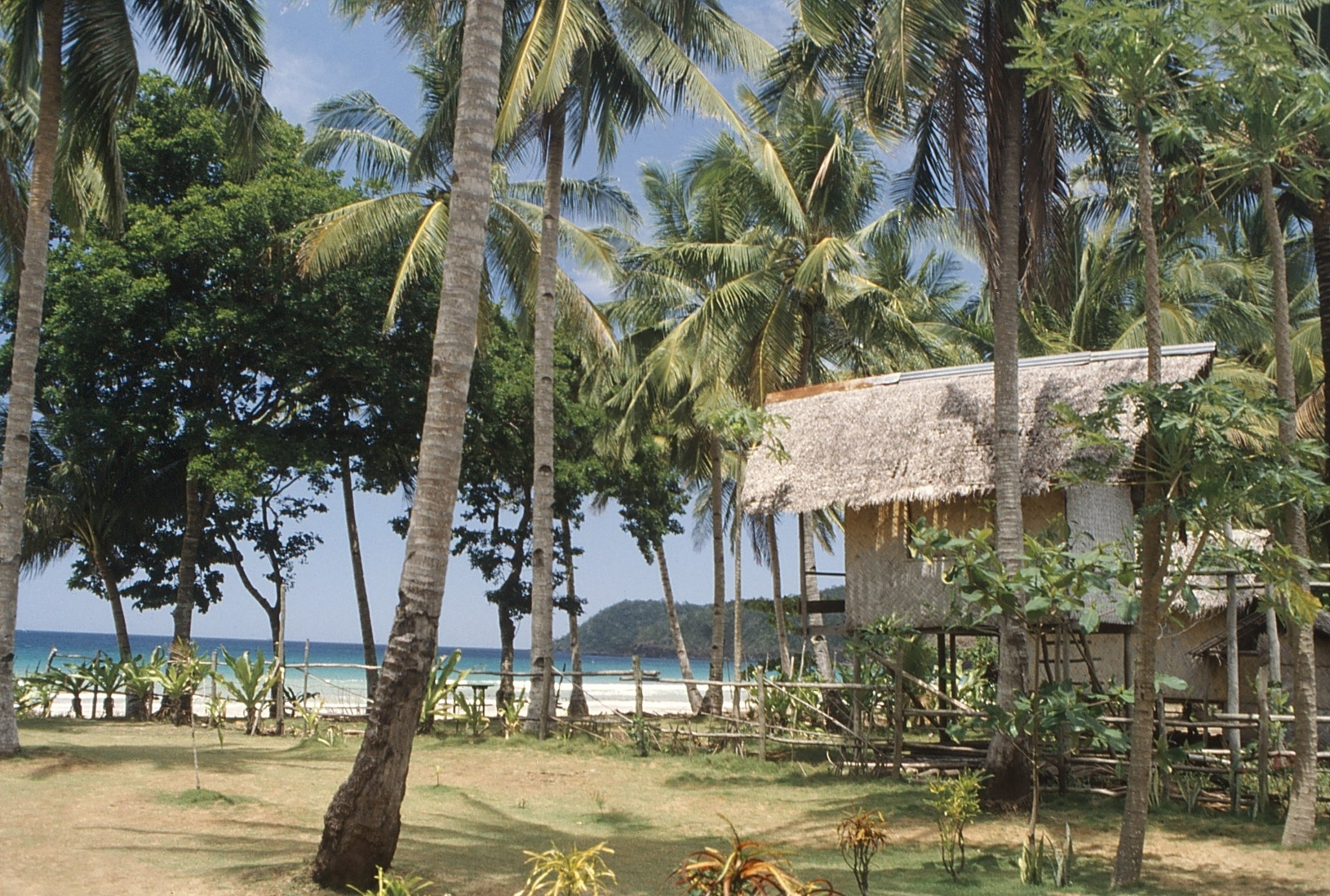
A nipa hut in Palawan

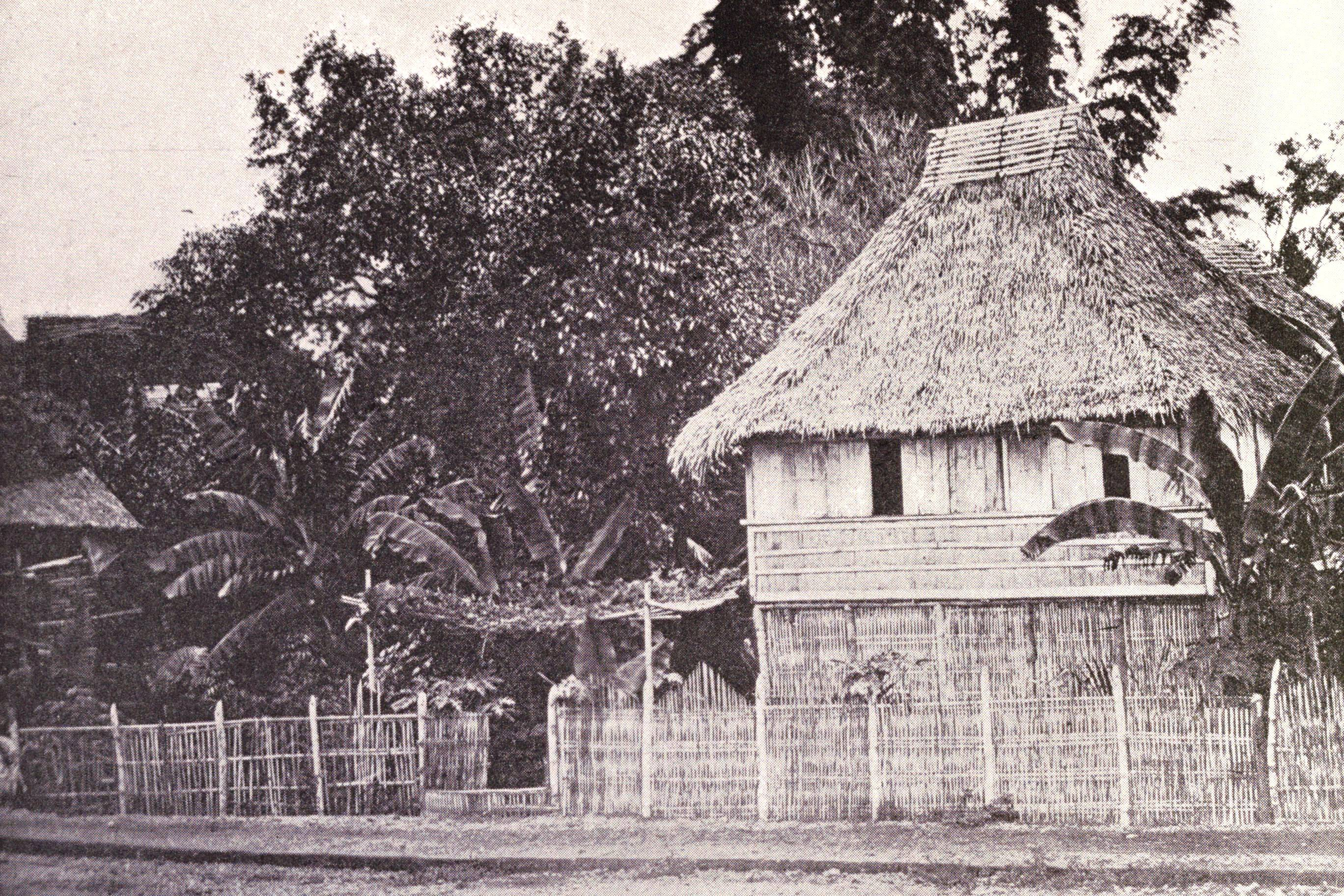
Native house in suburbs of Manila, 1899

The Bahay Kubo, Kamalig, or Nipa Hut, is a type of stilt house use by most of the lowland cultures of the Philippines. It often serves as an icon of broader Filipino culture, or, more specifically, Filipino rural culture.

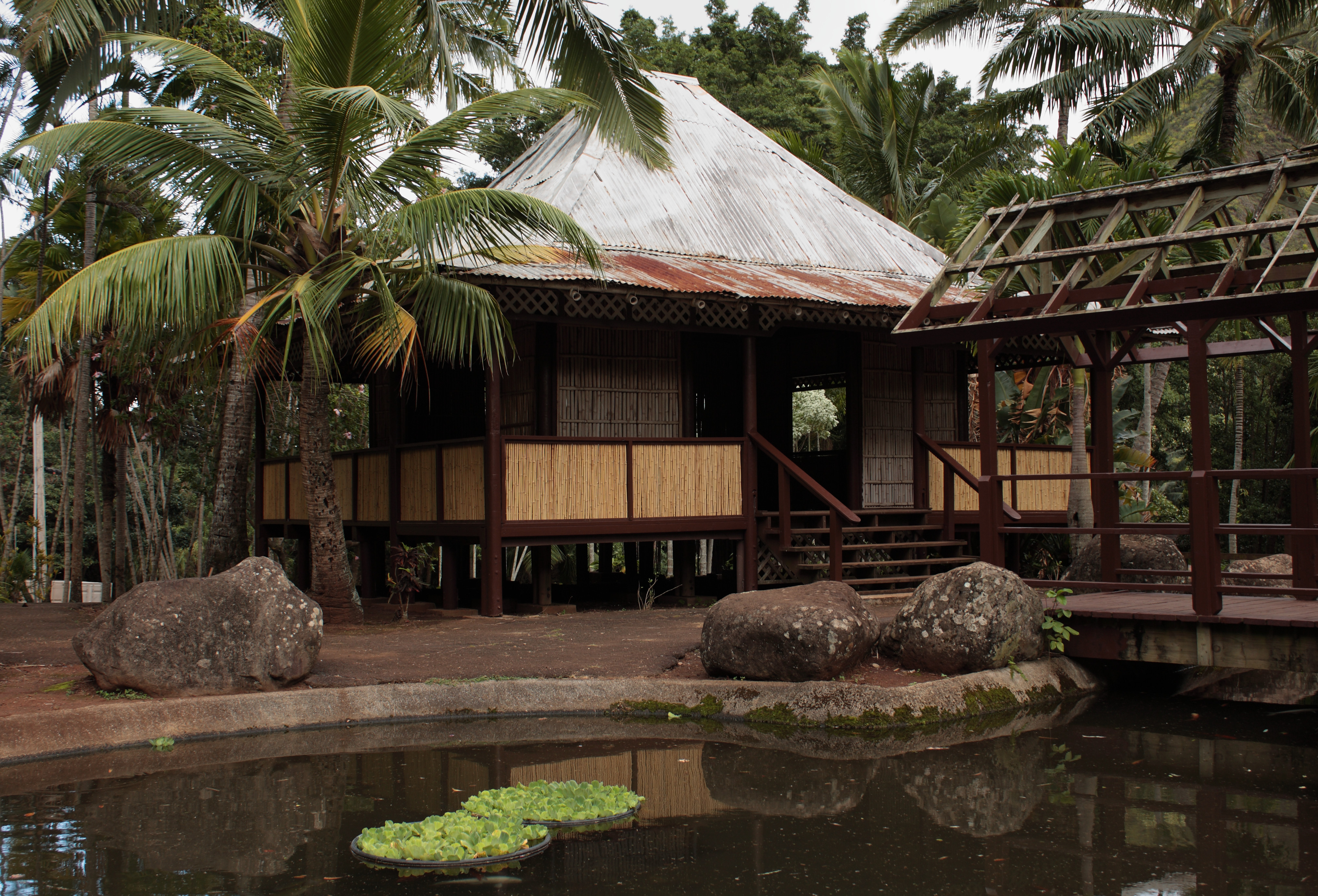
Bahay Kubo (Nipa Hut) at Kepaniwai Park, Iao Valley, Maui, Hawaii

Although there is no strict definition of the Bahay Kubo and styles of construction vary throughout the Philippine archipelago, similar conditions in Philippine lowland areas have led to numerous characteristics "typical" of examples of Bahay Kubo.

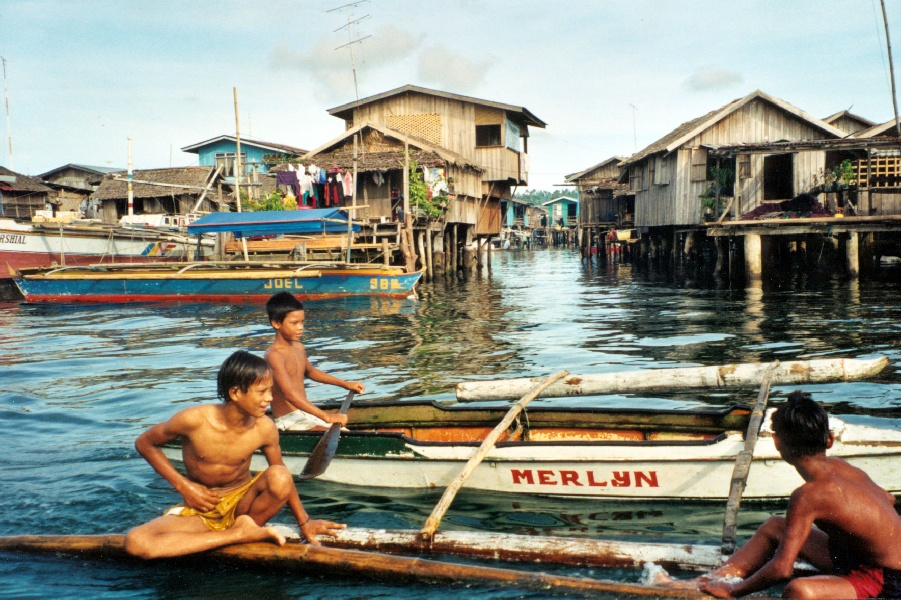
Modern Bajau stilt houses over the sea in Basilan, southern Philippines

With few exceptions arising only in modern times, most Bahay Kubo are raised on stilts such that the living area has to be accessed through ladders. This naturally divides the bahay kubo into three areas: the actual living area in the middle, the area beneath it (referred to in Tagalog as the "Silong"), and the roof space ("Bubungan" in Tagalog), which may or may not be separated from the living area by a ceiling ("Kisame" in Tagalog).

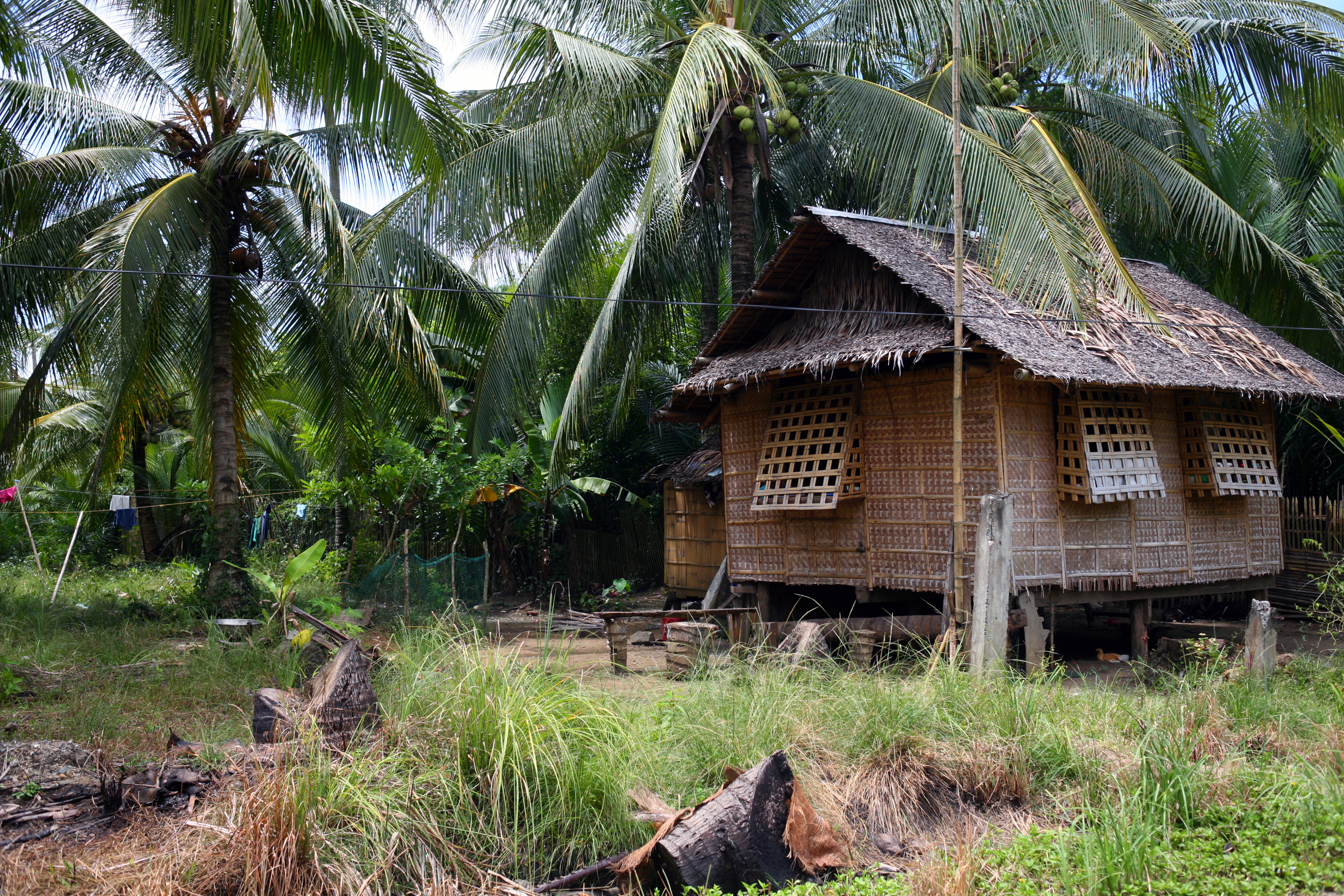
Stilt house in Kalibo

The traditional roof shape of the Bahay Kubo is tall and steeply pitched, ending in long eaves. A tall roof created space above the living area through which warm air could rise, giving the Bahay Kubo a natural cooling effect even during the hot summer season. The steep pitch allowed water to flow down quickly at the height of the monsoon season while the long eaves gave people a limited space to move about around the house's exterior whenever it rained. The steep pitch of the roofs are often used to explain why many Bahay Kubo survived the ash fall from the Mt. Pinatubo eruption, when more 'modern' houses notoriously collapsed from the weight of the ash.

Raised up on hardwood stilts which serve as the main posts of the house, Bahay Kubo have a Silong (the Tagalog word also means "shadow") area under the living space for a number of reasons, the most important of which are to create a buffer area for rising waters during floods, and to prevent pests such as rats from getting up to the living area. This section of the house is often used for storage, and sometimes for raising farm animals, and thus may or may not be fenced off.

The main living area of the Bahay Kubo is designed to let in as much fresh air and natural light as possible. Smaller Bahay Kubo will often have bamboo slat floors which allow cool air to flow into the living space from the silong below (in which case the Silong is not usually used for items which produce strong smells), and the particular Bahay Kubo may be built without a kisame (ceiling) so that hot air can rise straight into the large area just beneath the roof, and out through strategically placed vents there.

The walls are always of light material such as wood, bamboo rods, or bamboo mats called "sawali." As such, they tend to also let some coolness flow naturally through them during hot times, and keep warmth in during the cold wet season. The cube shape distinctive of the Bahay Kubo arises from the fact that it is easiest to pre-build the walls and then attach them to the wooden stilt-posts that serve as the corners of the house. The construction of a Bahay Kubo is therefore usually modular, with the wooden stilts established first, a floor frame built next, then wall frames, and finally, the roof.

In addition, bahay kubo are typically built with large windows, to let in more air and natural light. The most traditional are large awning windows, held open by a wooden rod. Sliding window sashes are also common, made either with plain wood or with wooden Capiz-shell frames, which allow some light to enter the living area even with the window sashes closed. In more recent decades inexpensive jalousie windows also became commonly used. In larger examples, the large upper windows may be augmented with smaller windows called ventanillas (Spanish for "little window) underneath, which can be opened to let in additional air, especially hot days.

Some (but not all) Bahay Kubo, especially one built for long-term residence, feature a Batalan "wet area" distinct from other sections of the house – usually jutting out somewhat from one of the walls. Sometimes at the same level as the living area and sometimes at ground level, the Batalan can contain any combination of cooking and dishwashing area, bathing area, and in some cases, a lavatory.

The walls of the living area are made of light materials – with posts, walls, and floors typically made of wood or bamboo and other light materials. Topped by a thatched roof, often made out of nipa, anahaw, or some other locally plentiful plant. The Filipino term "Bahay Kubo" literally means "cube house", describing the shape of the dwelling. The term "Nipa Hut", introduced during the Philippines' American colonial era, refers to the nipa or anahaw thatching material often used for the roofs.

Nipa huts were the customary houses of the Indigenous people of the Philippines before the Spaniards arrived. They are still used today, especially in rural areas. Different architectural designs are present among the different ethnolinguistic groups in the country, although all of them conform to being stilt houses, similar to those found in neighboring countries such as Indonesia, Malaysia, and other countries of Southeast Asia. The advent of the Spanish Colonial era introduced the idea of building more permanent communities with the Church and Government Center as a focal point. This new community setup made construction using heavier, more permanent materials desirable. Finding European construction styles impractical given local conditions, both Spanish and Filipino builders quickly adapted the characteristics of the Bahay Kubo and applied it to Antillean houses locally known as Bahay na Bato (Literally "stone house" in Tagalog).

== Samoa ==
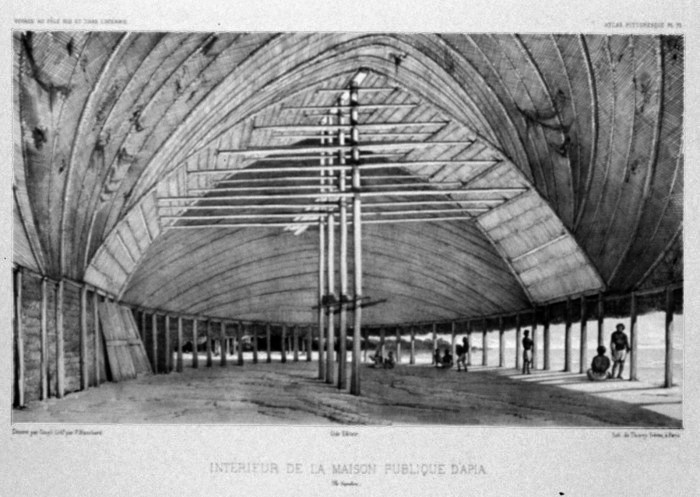
Interior fale, Apia, D'Urville, 1842

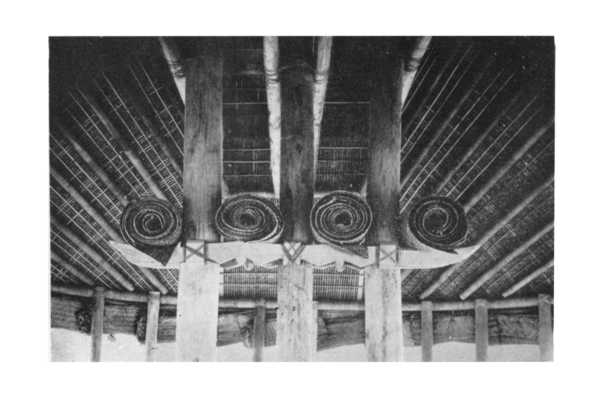
Interior fale tele with central pillars and curved rafters

The architecture of Samoa is characterised by openness, with the design mirroring the culture and life of the Samoan people who inhabit the Samoa Islands. Architectural concepts are incorporated into Samoan proverbs, oratory and metaphors, as well as linking to other art forms in Samoa, such as boat building and tattooing. The spaces outside and inside of traditional Samoan architecture are part of cultural form, ceremony and ritual.

Fale is the Samoan word for all types of houses, from small to large.

In general, traditional Samoan architecture is characterized by an oval or circular shape, with wooden posts holding up a domed roof. There are no walls. The base of the architecture is a skeleton frame.

Before European arrival and the availability of Western materials, a Samoan fale did not use any metal in its construction.

== Scandinavia (Sámi) ==
=== Traditional architecture (ethno-architecture) of the Sámi ===
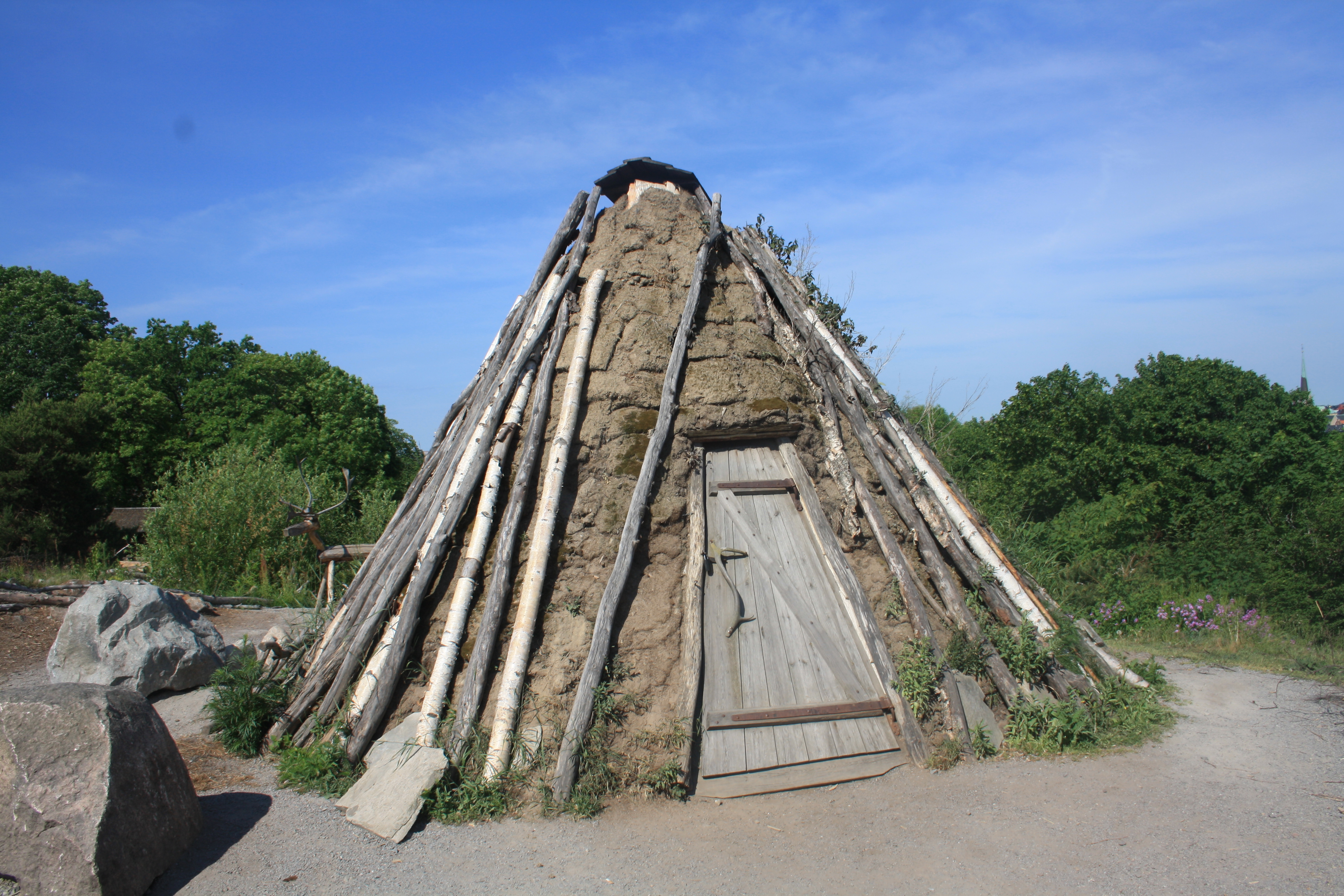
Reconstruction of a peat goahti at Skansen open-air museum

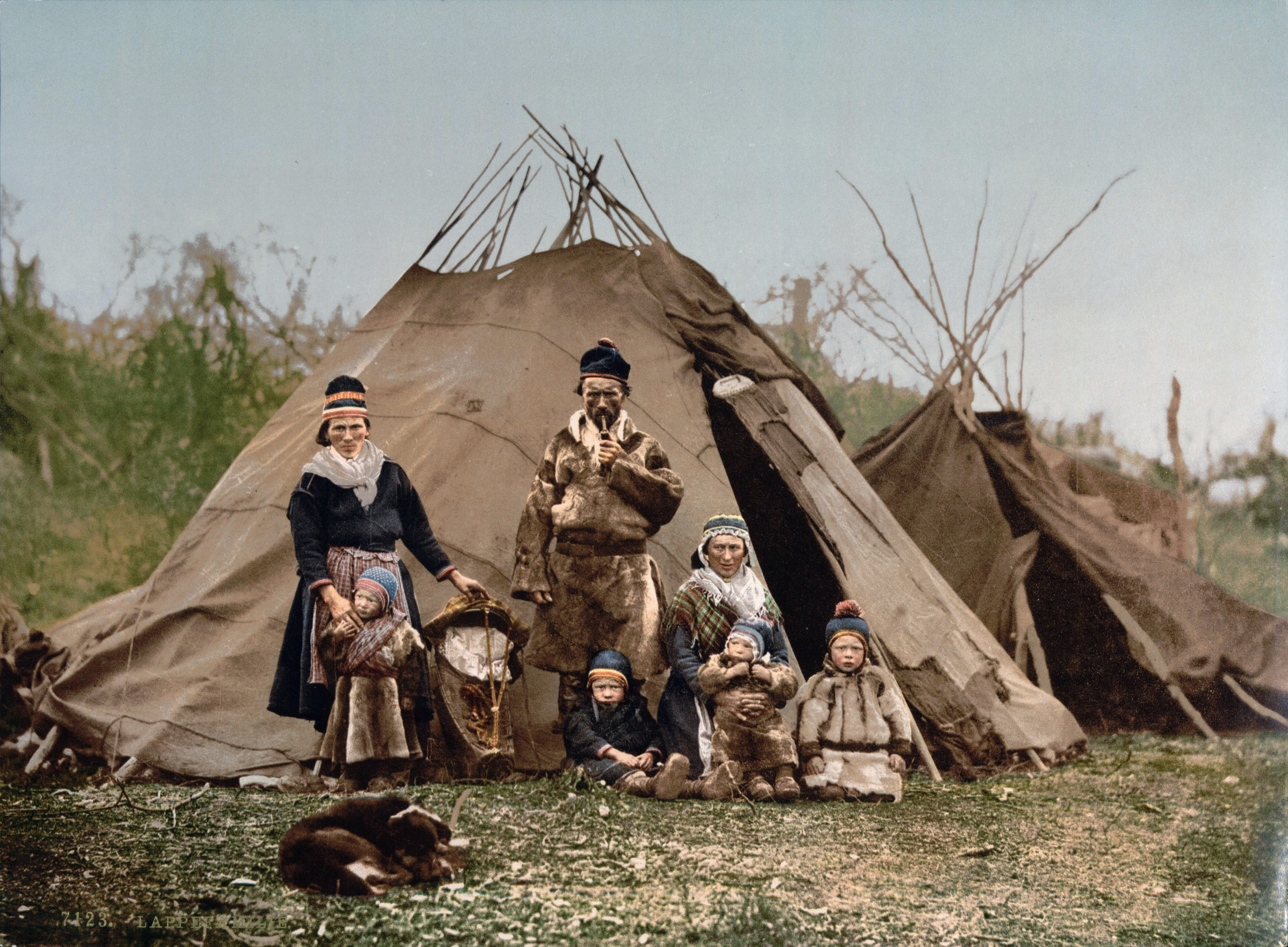
A Sami family in front of goahti. The tent in the background is a lavvu. Note the differences in the pole placement of the two structures. This photo was taken around 1900 in northern Scandinavia.

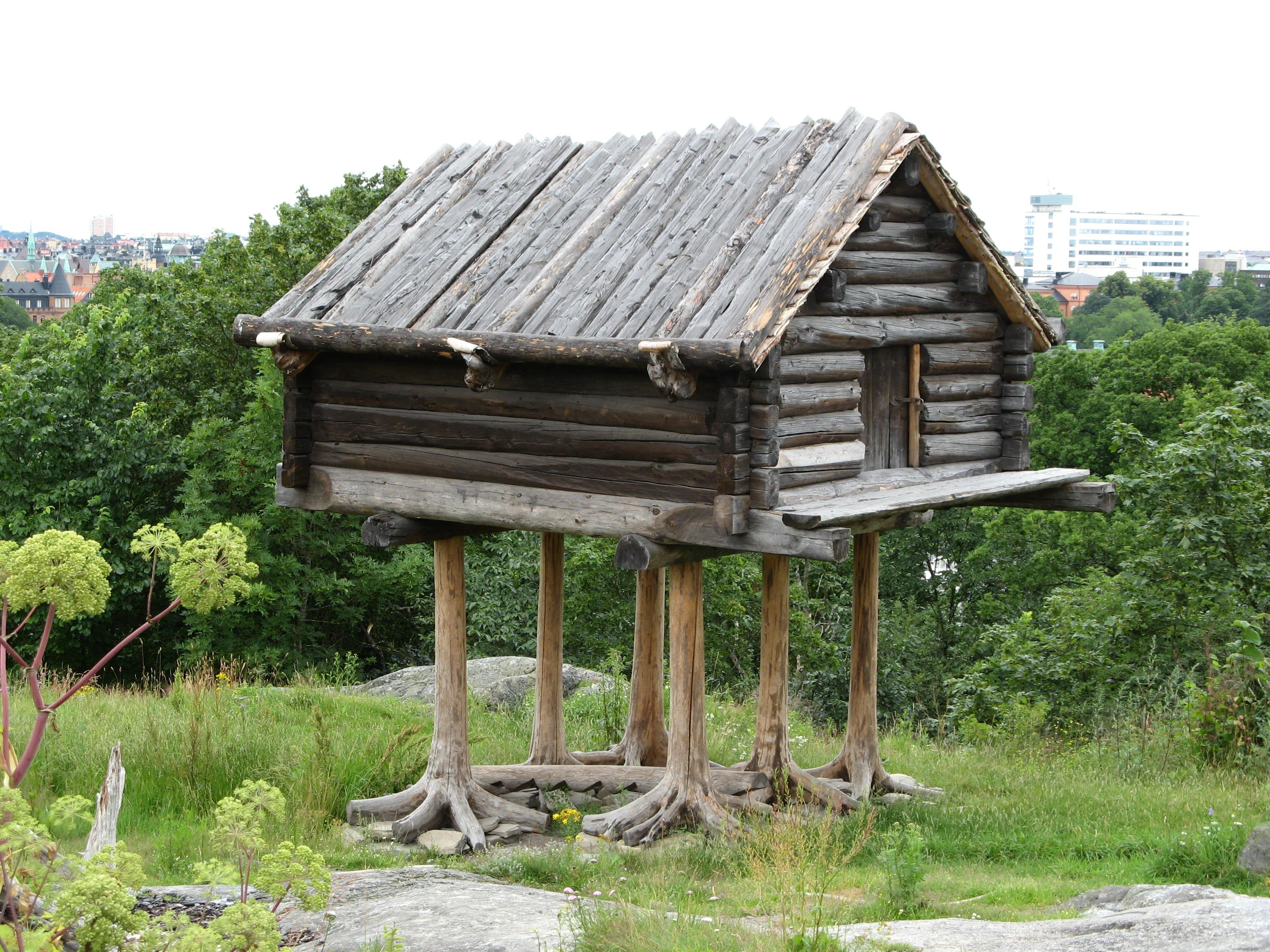
Traditional raised Sami storehouse, displayed at Skansen, Stockholm. A similar structure, is mentioned in Russian fairy tales as a "house with chicken legs"

Sápmi is the term for Sámi (also Saami) traditional lands. The Sámi people are the Indigenous people of the northern part of the Scandinavian Peninsula and large parts of the Kola Peninsula, which encompasses parts of far northern Norway, Sweden, Finland, and Russia, and the border area between south and middle Sweden and Norway. The Sámi are the only Indigenous people of Scandinavia recognized and protected under the international conventions of Indigenous people, and the northernmost Indigenous people of Europe. Sámi ancestral lands span an area of approximately 388,350 km^{2} (150,000 sq. mi.) across the Nordic countries.

There are a number of Sámi ethnoarchitectural forms; including the lavvu, goahti, the Finnish laavu. The differences between the goahti and the lavvu can be seen when looking at the top of structures. A lavvu will have its poles coming together, while the goahti will have its poles separate and not coming together. The turf version of the goahti will have the canvas replaced with wood resting on the structure covered with birch bark then peat to provide a durable construction.

Lavvu (or Northern Sami: lávvu, Inari Sami: láávu, Skolt Sami: kååvas, Kildin Sami: koavas, Finnish: kota or umpilaavu, Norwegian: lavvo or sametelt, and Swedish: kåta) is a structure built by the Sámi of northern Scandinavia. It has a design similar to a Native American tipi but is less vertical and more stable in high winds. It enables the Indigenous cultures of the treeless plains of northern Scandinavia and the high Arctic of Eurasia to follow their reindeer herds. It is still used as a temporary shelter by the Sámi, and increasingly by other people for camping.

There are several historical references that describe the lavvu structure (also called a kota, or a variation on this name) used by the Sami. These structures have the following in common:

1. The lavvu is supported by three or more evenly spaced forked or notched poles that form a tripod.
2. There are upwards of ten or more unsecured straight poles that are laid up against the tripod and which give form to the structure.
3. The lavvu does not need any stakes, guy-wire or ropes to provide shape or stability to the structure.
4. The shape and volume of the lavvu is determined by the size and quantity of the poles that are used for the structure.
5. There is no center pole needed to support this structure.

No historical record has come to light that describes the Sami using a single-pole structure claimed to be a lavvu, or any other Scandinavian variant name for the structure. The definition and description of this structure has been fairly consistent since the 17th century and possibly many centuries earlier.

A goahti (also gábma, gåhte, gåhtie and gåetie, Norwegian: gamme, Finnish: kota, Swedish: kåta), is a Sami hut or tent of three types of covering: fabric, peat moss or timber. The fabric-covered goahti looks very similar to a Sami lavvu, but often constructed slightly larger. In its tent version the goahti is also called a 'curved pole' lavvu, or a 'bread box' lavvu as the shape is more elongated while the lavvu is in a circular shape.

The interior construction of the poles is thus: 1) four curved poles (8–12 feet (2.4–3.7 m) long), 2) one straight center pole (5–8 feet (1.5–2.4 m) long), and 3) approximately a dozen straight wall-poles (10–15 feet (3.0–4.6 m) long). All the pole sizes can vary considerably.

The four curved poles curve to about a 130° angle. Two of these poles have a hole drilled into them at one end, with those ends being joined together by the long center pole that is inserted by the described poles. The other two curved poles are also joined at the other end of the long pole. When this structure is set up, a four-legged stand is formed with the long pole at the top and center of the structure. With the four-legged structure standing up to about five to eight feet in height, approximately ten or twelve straight "wall-poles" are laid up against the structure. The goahti covering, today made usually of canvas, is laid up against the structure and tied down. There can be more than one covering that covers the structure.

=== Contemporary Sámi architecture ===
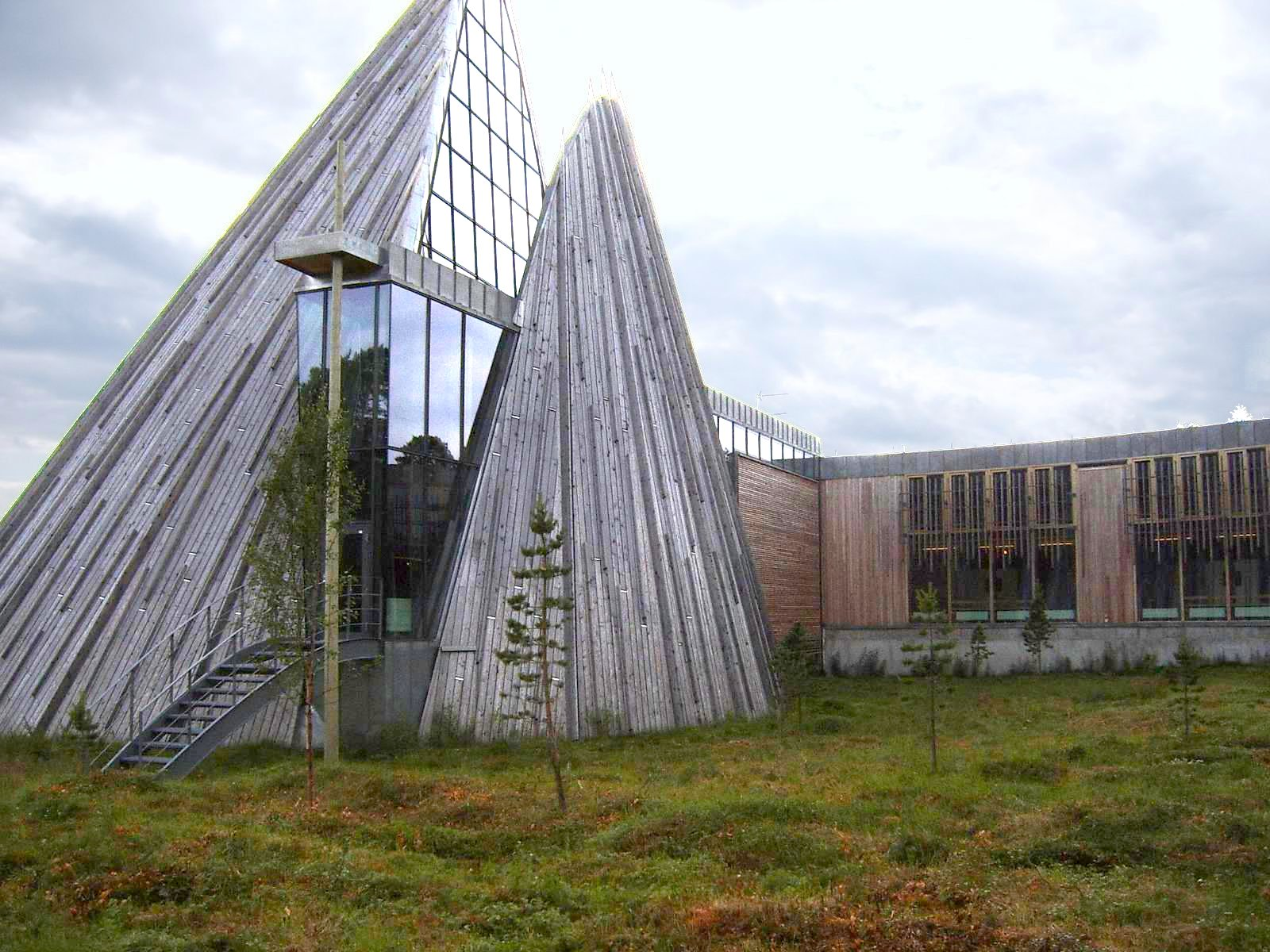
The Sámi Parliament building in Norway designed by Stein Halvorsen & Christian Sundby

The Sámi Parliament building was designed by the (non-Sámi) architects Stein Halvorsen & Christian Sundby, who won the Norwegian government's call for projects in 1995, and inaugurated in 2005. The government called for a building such that "the Sámi Parliament appears dignified" and "reflects Sámi architecture."

Another similar example of Sami-inspired architecture is the Várjjat Sámi Musea (Varanger Sami Museum, VSM) in Unjárga Municipality in Finnmark county, Norway.

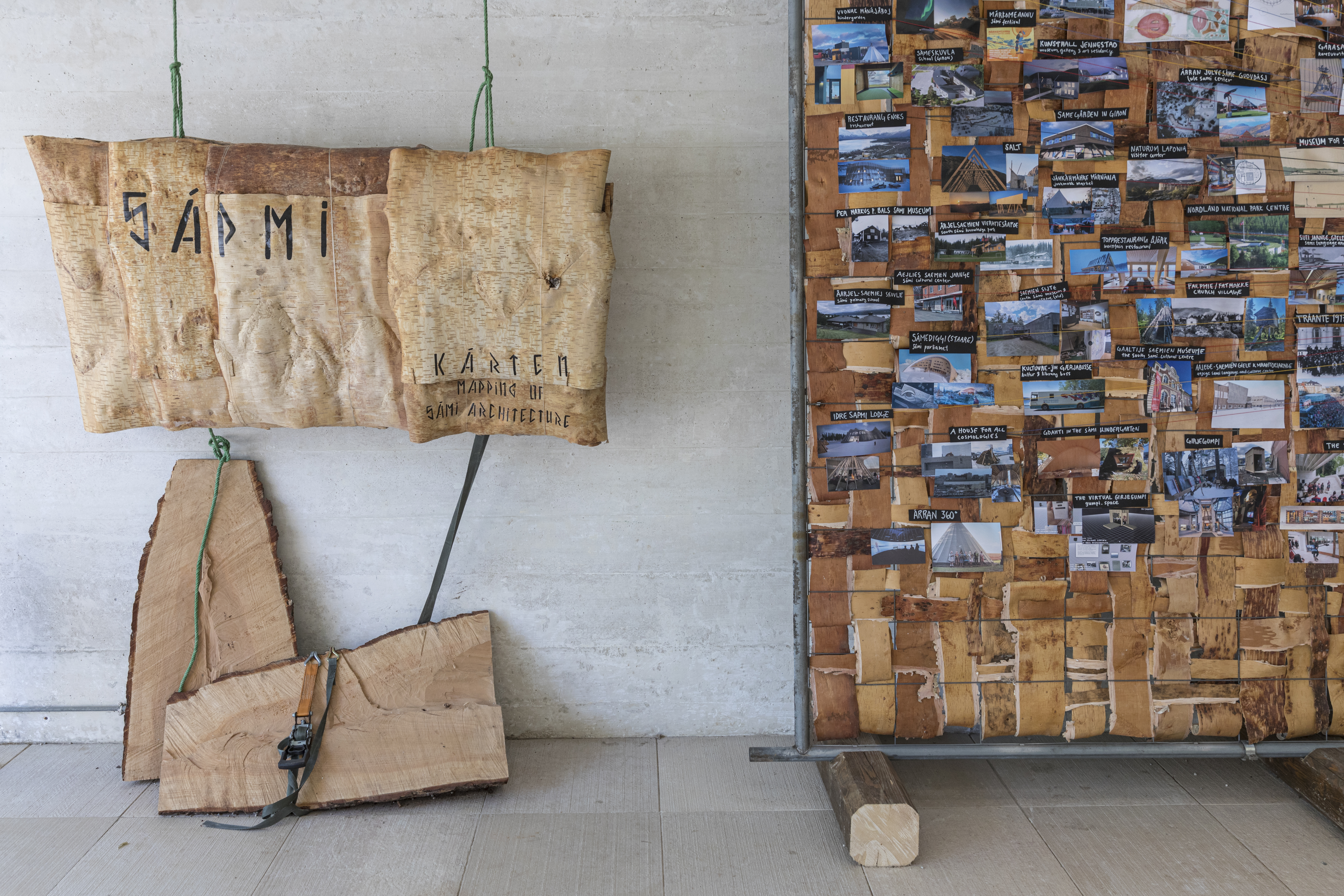
The ongoing Architecture in Sápmi mapping project by Astrid Fadnes, Katrine Rugeldal, and Jenni Hakovirta forms part of Joar Nango's Girjegumpi and was developed for the Nordic Pavilion at the 18th Venice Architecture Biennale in 2023.

The work of Sámi artist and architect Joar Nango explores the intersections of traditional Indigenous construction methods, contemporary architecture, and new media.

== United States ==
=== Traditional architecture (ethno-architecture) of Hawai'i ===
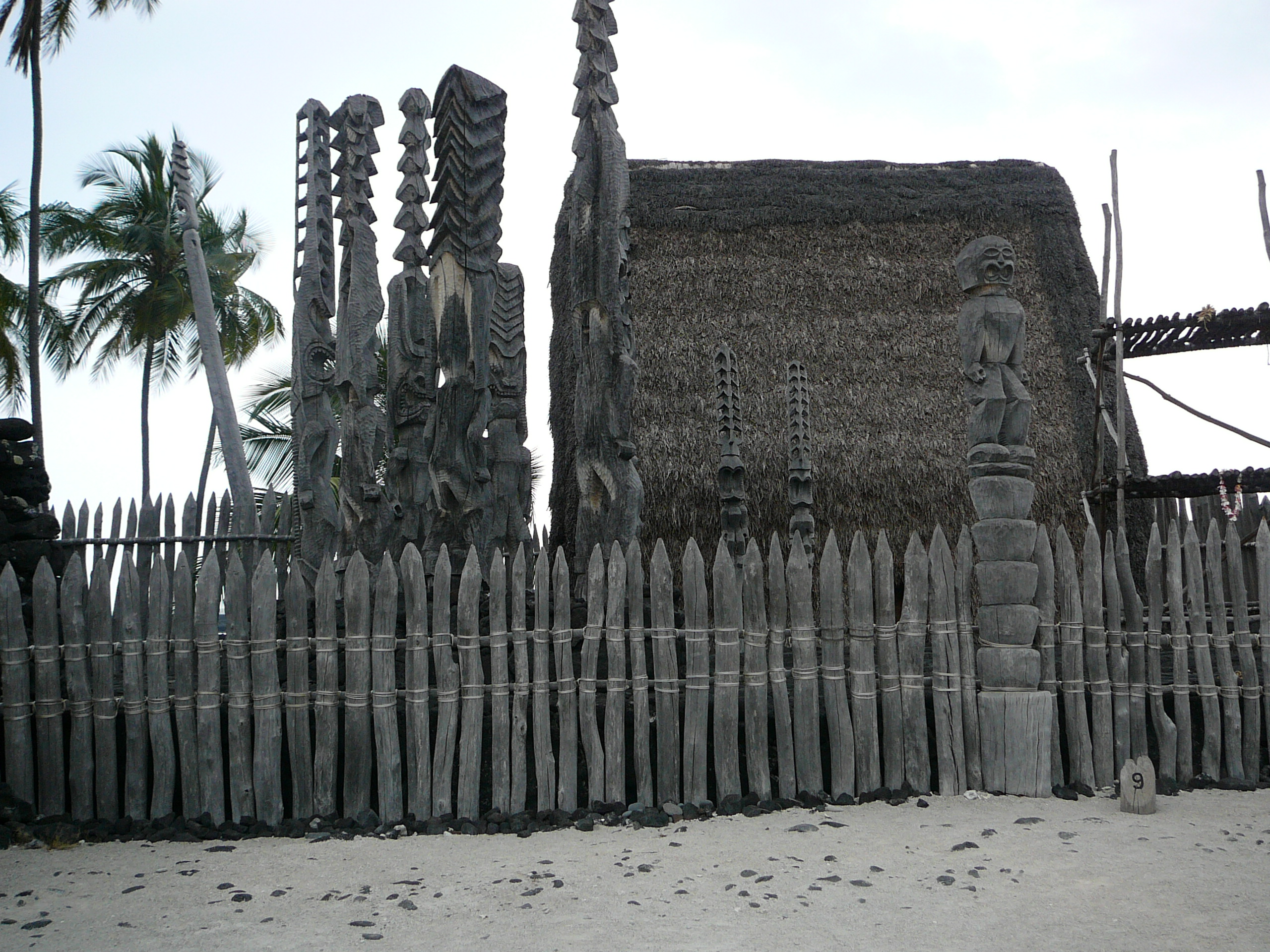
Hale O Keawe

Within the body of Hawai'ian architecture are various subsets of styles; each are considered typical of particular historical periods. The earliest form of Hawaiian architecture originates from what is called ancient Hawaiʻi—designs employed in the construction of village shelters from the simple shacks of outcasts and slaves, huts for the fishermen and canoe builders along the beachfronts, the shelters of the working class makaʻainana, the elaborate and sacred heiau of kahuna and the palatial thatched homes on raised basalt foundation of the aliʻi. The way a simple grass shack was constructed in ancient Hawaiʻi was telling of who lived in a particular home. The patterns in which dried plants and lumber were fashioned together could identify caste, skill and trade, profession and wealth. Hawaiian architecture previous to the arrival of British explorer Captain James Cook used symbolism to identify religious value of the inhabitants of certain structures. Feather standards called kahili and koa adorned with kapa cloth and crossed at the entrance of certain homes called puloʻuloʻu indicated places of aliʻi (nobility caste). Kiʻi enclosed within basalt walls indicated the homes of kahuna (priestly caste).

=== Puebloan architecture ===
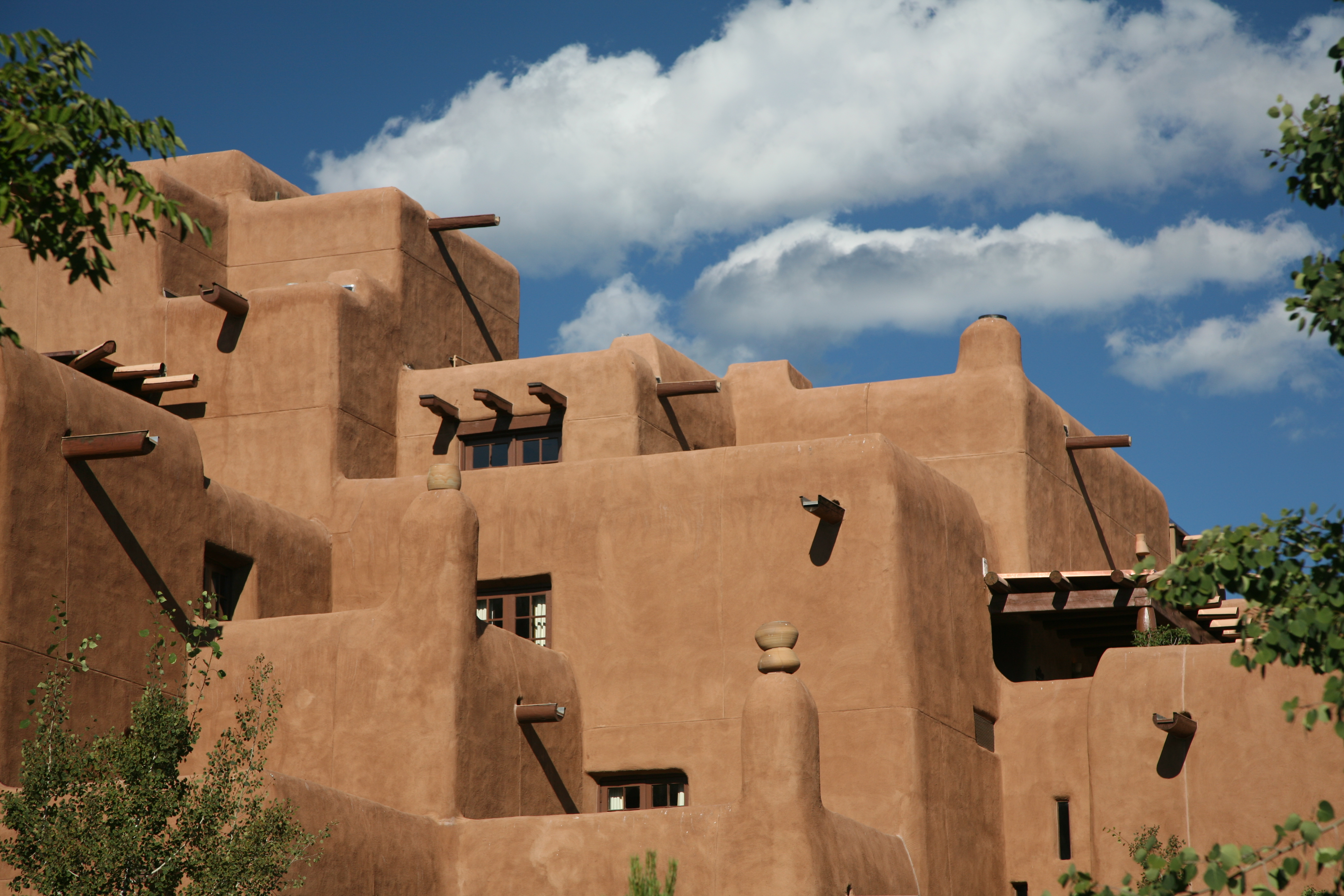
Pueblo style building in Santa Fe, New Mexico

Pueblo-style architecture imitates the appearance of traditional Pueblo adobe construction, though other materials such as brick or concrete are often substituted. If adobe is not used, rounded corners, irregular parapets, and thick, battered walls are used to simulate it. Walls are usually stuccoed and painted in earth tones. Multistory buildings usually employ stepped massing similar to that seen at Taos Pueblo. Roofs are always flat. Common features of the Pueblo Revival style include projecting wooden roof beams or vigas, which sometimes serve no structural purpose, "corbels", curved—often stylized—beam supports and latillas, which are peeled branches or strips of wood laid across the tops of vigas to create a foundation (usually supporting dirt or clay) for a roof.

== See also ==
- Goahti
- Hogan
- Lavvu
- Tipi
- Wigwam
- Yaranga
