= Designing with Country =

Designing with Country is a design methodology that belongs to qualified First Nations design professionals in Australia. It is used in architecture and broader built environment professions such as landscape architecture, urban design and urban planning to reflect the work of Aboriginal and Torres Strait Islander design and architecture professionals within the professions.

Designing with Country has been defined by the First Nations Advisory Committee to the Australian Institute of Architects, as:

Designing with Country is integrating the process of design holistically with Country through genuine First Nations' design methodologies, processes and perspectives. To be able to Design with Country you must be of Country. Designing with Country must be First Nations led. It is an approach to design that centres Country informed by First Nations knowledge systems, cultures and ways of being. Designing with Country requires designs to originate and find inspiration from First Nations' design thinking and the connection to the story, spirit, Ancestral memory, ecology and energy of Country as understood by local communities.

Designing with Country impacts the process and scope of design, as noted by the First Nations Advisory Committee:

Designing with Country is more than just being a qualified First Nations designer. To ensure genuine Designing with Country, from before the brief has been written, First Nations leadership and design thinking must have been integrated – from authoring the brief, choosing a site, and developing a business case, all the way through the process of design and construction to the point of practical completion and beyond to consider ongoing relationships.

While some non-Indigenous architecture, design and landscape architecture organisations and educational institutions reference Designing with Country for their own practices and courses, according to Parlour's Deadly Djurumin Yarn with Dr Danièle Hromek and Sarah Lynn Rees titled, What is designing with Country?, doing so is cultural appropriation. As noted in the First Nations Advisory Committee in their resource, Terms, Concepts and Shared Understandings, misusing the term risks colonising and commodifying it:

Non-Indigenous architects and designers can use terms such as "Culturally Responsive" as noted in the National Standards of Competency, and "Connecting with Country" as required in NSW when responding to the Connecting with Country Framework.

The term Designing with Country first appears in 2020 in the Designing with Country discussion paper published by the New South Wales Government Architect, however the term was not defined in the discussion paper. Since then understandings of the term have moved on to reflect the methodology First Nations ancestors have used to care for, curate and design Country for thousands of generations of people.

== Prominent practitioners ==
Jack Gilmer
Danièle Hromek
Bradley Kerr
Dillon Kombumerri
Andrew Lane
Francoise Lane
Kevin O'Brien
Sarah Lynn Rees
Kaylie Salvatori

== Prominent researchers ==
Beau de Belle
Georgia Birks
Carroll Go-Sam
Danièle Hromek
Michael Mossman

== See also ==
- Indigenous architecture
- Country-centred design
