= Mayi-Kutuna language =

Extinct Australian Aboriginal language

Mayi-Kutuna
- Mayaguduna
- Native to: Australia
- Region: Cape York Peninsula, Queensland
- Ethnicity: Maikudunu, ?Marrago
- Extinct: (date missing)
- Language family: Pama–Nyungan: Mayabic; Mayi-Kutuna

Language codes
- ISO 639-3: xmy
- Glottolog: maya1280
- AIATSIS: G24
- ELP: Mayi-Kutuna

Mayi-Kutuna, also spelt Mayaguduna, Maikudunu and other variants, is an extinct Mayabic language once spoken by the Mayi-Kutuna, an Aboriginal Australian people of the present-day Cape York Peninsula in northern Queensland, Australia.

Gavan Breen (1981) thought that the Marrago might have been a sub-group of the Mayi Kutuna people; Paul Memmott (1994) lists the Marrago language separately but gives no further detail. Their status is unconfirmed by the AIATSIS collection.
