= Sarah Lynn Rees =

Indigenous Australian architect

Sarah Lynn Rees is a Palawa woman descending from the Plangermaireener and Trawlwoolway people of North East Tasmania, Based in Birrarung-ga (Melbourne), Rees is an architectural practitioner, academic and writer. She is a prominent advocate and advisor with a firm commitment to Indigenising the built environment.

== Education ==
Rees began her architectural studies at the Melbourne School of Design at the University of Melbourne. She was the recipient of the Dean's Honour Award for three years in a row and graduated with First Class Honours. Rees then undertook a MPhil in Architecture and Urban Design at the University of Cambridge, as a Charlie Perkins scholar. Her thesis was on Indigenous housing in remote Australian communities.

== Practice and research ==
Rees has practiced architecture in Melbourne and London and currently heads the Indigenous Advisory, Architecture and Design services at Jackson Clements Burrows (JCB) in Melbourne. She began her practice career as a student at JCB and worked at aLL Design, the London-based practice of Will Alsop, following her studies at the University of Cambridge. In 2020 Rees was part of a design team shortlisted in the national design competition for the Pier Pavilion at Barangaroo (MUIR Architecture, Openwork, Sarah Lynn Rees with Scott Carver and WSP).

Rees combines her work in practice with education and scholarly work and is a lecturer in architecture at Monash University. Her research involves developing resources for built environment practitioners to improve collaborative engagement processes with Traditional Owners and Indigenous communities. This covers all stages of architectural activity, from briefing and procurement, to design processes, to publication and awards. Rees is also curating a series of articles for Architecture Australia on Indigenous architecture and design.

Selected essays and publications include:

- "Indigenizing practice: To award, or not to award?", Architecture Australia (November 2020)
- "Blakitecture: Beyond acknowledgement and into action" Architecture Australia (March 2020)
- “Our cities reflect the denial of history. Blak design aims to change that” Guardian Australia (July 2018)
- Re-valuing Heritage, special issue of Architect Victoria (Summer 2020), edited by Jack Mitchell and Sarah Lynn Rees

== Advisory and advocacy ==
Rees is highly active in public discussions of architecture and the built environment, as a writer, speaker and convenor. This extends and is integrated with her research and practice work focusses on Indigenising the built environment. In 2018 Rees spoke at Nā Te Kore From the Void, the 2nd Biennial International Indigenous Design Forum in Christchurch, New Zealand. In 2019, she gave an invited address to Collective Agency, the 2019 Australian Institute of Architects National Conference.

Public talks, presentations and interviews include:

- “BLAKitecture sheds light on Traditional Owner influences on modern design and architecture” interview on Connection Matters Radio November 2020
- “Rights and Reclamations” AA Roundtable with Dillon Kombumerri and Carroll Go-Sam, Asia Pacific Architecture Festival, March 2020
- “Gendered Indigeneity”, a conversation with Carroll Go-Sam, Transformations: Action on Equity, University of Melbourne, November 2019
- “Working Between Cultures”, panel discussion with Shaneen Fantin and Elisapeta Heta, Melbourne Design Week, March 2019
- “Designing for Country’, panel discussion with Elisapeta Heta, Kyle Vander Kuyp and Nick Pearson, Hassell, March 2019
- “Federation Square”, The Politics of Public Space vol 3

Rees also organises and convenes many public events, which both increase awareness and knowledge among the wider community and builds the profile of many Indigenous built environment professionals. Since 2017 she has been program advisor and curator of the BLAKitecture series at Melbourne’s MPavilion. This annual program works to “centralise Indigenous voices in conversations about architecture, the representation of histories, the present state and the future of our built environments”. In 2018 Rees was closely involved in planning and organising the first APB Symposium at the University of Melbourne with Jefa Greenway. “Go Back to Where You Came From: Indigenous Design Past | Present | Future” brought Indigenous speakers from across Australia and around the world to explore the role of Indigenous design.

Among her many advisory roles, Rees is a director of the research-based advocacy organisation Parlour: women, equity, architecture and a member of the Victorian Design Review Panel for the Office of the Victorian Government Architect. Rees is active with the Australian Institute of Architects and is Co-Chair of the First Nations Advisory Working Group (with Paul Memmott). In 2021 she was elected to the Victorian Chapter Council, and she sits on the Editorial Committee of Architect Victoria.

Previous roles with the Institute include sitting on the Emerging Architects + Graduates Network (EmAGN), 2013 Vice President of SONA (Student Organised Network for Architecture) and 2012 Student Representative on the Victorian Chapter Council. Rees has also sat on the National Trust of Australia Landscape and Indigenous advisory groups. In 2019, she was a special Advisor to the Jury for the Powerhouse Museum Precinct at Parramatta international design competition.
