= The Public, West Bromwich =

Coordinates: 52.518901°N 1.993048°W

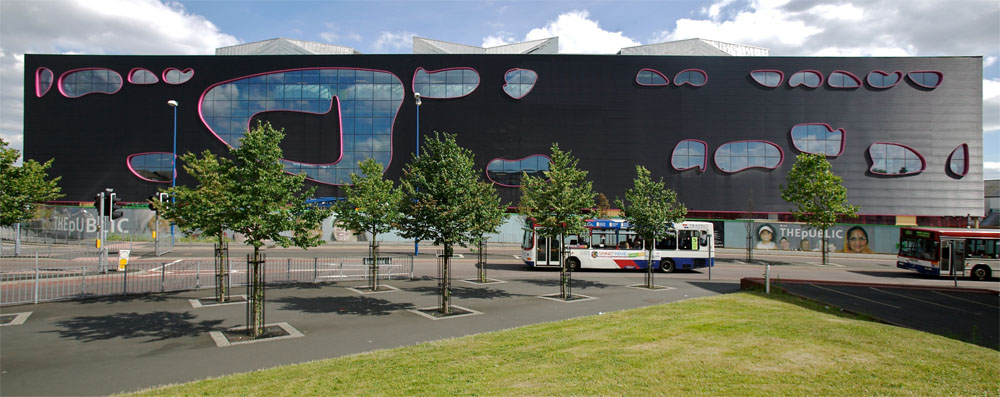
The Public Building

The Public was a multi-purpose venue and art gallery in West Bromwich, West Midlands, England, at the forefront of a regional regeneration programme which was – by late 2013– to also bring Europe's biggest Tesco, a multiplex cinema, restaurants and a new retail centre. It closed in November 2013. The building reopened as part of Sandwell College in October 2014.

Despite indications that the arts centre would be at the forefront of West Bromwich's 'Golden Future', on 9 May 2013 it was announced that Sandwell Metropolitan Borough Council was in discussion with Sandwell College to potentially lease The Public for use as a sixth-form college. At that time, the College's own sixth-form was oversubscribed with six applicants for every place.

In 2012–13 there were 380,000 visitors to the building from all sections of society – an increase of over 40% from the previous year. The Public's mission was to be a place where people came to create and make things for themselves and to enjoy other people's creativity – an echo of Cedric Price's concept of a Fun Palace. In 2012, The Guardian's Robert Clark described The Public as "a playground for adults" adding that "maybe that's a good role for a contemporary art gallery to embrace".

It was also home to 27 small companies as well as the Sandwell Arts Trust, who managed the building. Between them they employed around 120 people with a further 120 digital media apprentices.

An article in the previously critical Express and Star in September 2012 said that The Public was finally winning local people over, had found its purpose and belied remote odds to become one of the region's success stories. Just over a year later on 23 November 2013, The Public closed for good. The building was formally reopened as a sixth form college by Prince Edward, Earl of Wessex on 1 October 2014.

== Overview ==
The project grew out of the work by Jubilee Arts (founded 1974) whose mission was to enhance the lives of the local community through artistic programmes and endeavours. One aim of this group was to create a building which would serve as a permanent piece of art, be visually and structurally challenging and provide a place for community groups to gather to carry on the vision of Jubilee Arts.

British architect Will Alsop was selected to design the building with construction beginning in May 2003. Running over budget and with a number of organisations supporting the project going into liquidation and administration, The Public finally opened to visitors in 2008 (chiefly the ground floor), with construction of the ramp and digital artworks being completed in 2009. The building was finally completed in 2010 with the opening of its Level 2 Conference Suite and finalisation of office space on Level 4.

The building was operated and run by Sandwell Arts Trust (established August 2009) and featured exhibition space, interactive art works, cafe bar, theatre, conference and meeting rooms and office space.

By end of June 2013, Sandwell Arts Trust have indicated that 1,000,000 visitors had been through the doors.

== Arts Centre ==
Despite all its problems, The Public became an icon of the region and drew in visitors from the local area as well the Midlands and beyond. It was still reliant on public-subsidy but also gained income from hires, tenants and events, and planned to increase earned income once the building work that had surrounded was completed in summer 2013.

The visual arts programme attracted work by notable contemporary artists, alongside work by local artists. This approach helped raise the profile of art in an area where participation had been low. In summer 2013 Ordinary/Extra/Ordinary, curated by David Thorp was the main show, bringing together work by Tracey Emin, David Shrigley, Jeremy Deller among others as well as a new commission from Birmingham artist Lucy McLauchlan. Later in the summer, the Annual Summer Open was due to show local talent.

Previous exhibitions included The Art of Motion with work by Maurice Broomfield, a collaboration with other local art organisations and schools celebrating the work of local popular author Janet and Allan Ahlberg and contributions from well-known artists including photographer Martin Parr.

The Public was home to an eclectic programme of events with comedy shows from established names like Al Murray, Jenny Eclair and Alexei Sayle, music featuring up and coming bands as well as a wide range of activities from tea dancing to knitting that were led by local people.

== History ==
The construction and early history of the building were beset by many problems. The development had been highly controversial and encountered financial difficulties, going into administration before the expected opening date of July 2006, due to the withholding of a final tranche of £2 million that was due to be contributed by Sandwell Metropolitan Borough Council. Further controversy surrounded plans by The Public Gallery Limited to introduce a regular entry fee of £6.95. These plans were scrapped and The Arts Council agreed to a further £3 million grant, allowing The Public to grant free entry to the gallery to allow it to open in 2008–2009.

In November 2004 Alsop Architects left the project and architect Julian Flannery of Flannery & de la Pole took responsibility for the detailed design of the building interiors and for overseeing construction, which at that stage was around one third complete. In the summer of 2006 the practice developed a new brief and completion strategy for the project and several areas of the building, such as the Theatre, the Pink Tank Cafe and the Level 2 Flexible Space were fully redesigned.

Following the issue and problems, Sandwell Metropolitan Borough Council took over the building in 2009 and established the organisation Sandwell Arts Trust (a subsidiary of Sandwell Leisure Trust) to run and operate the building under license.

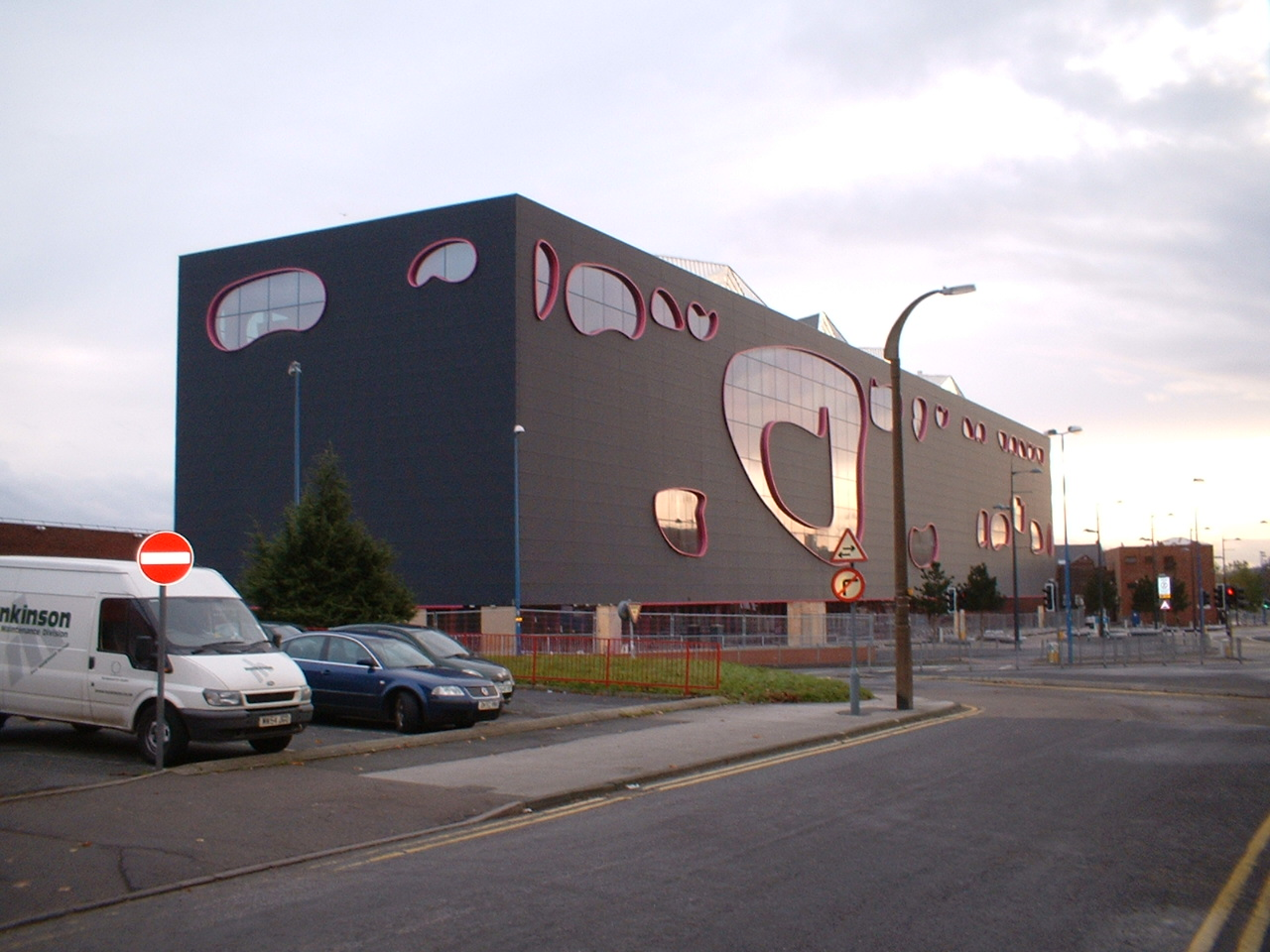
The Public, viewed from the north

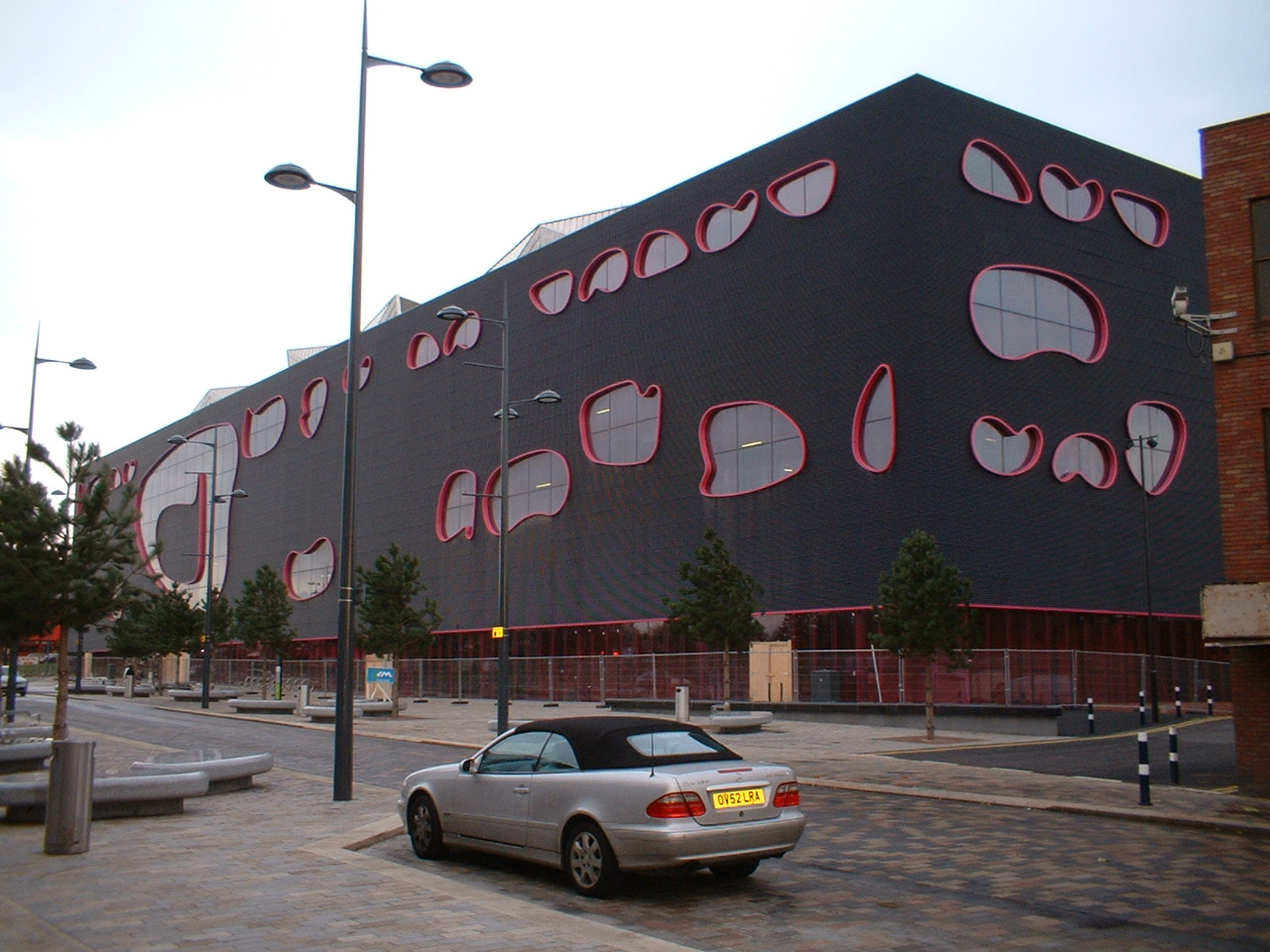
View from the north west

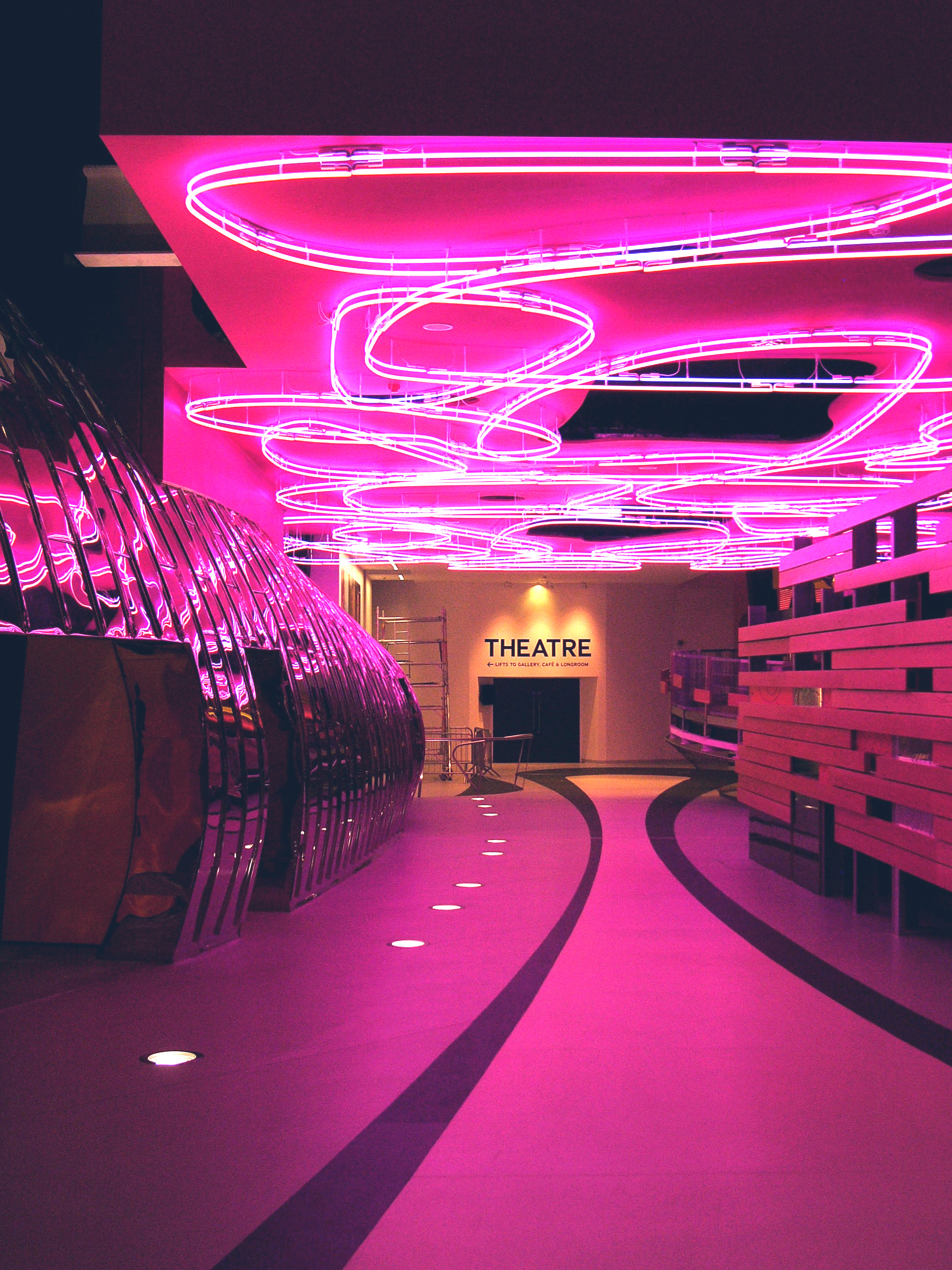
The Scribble

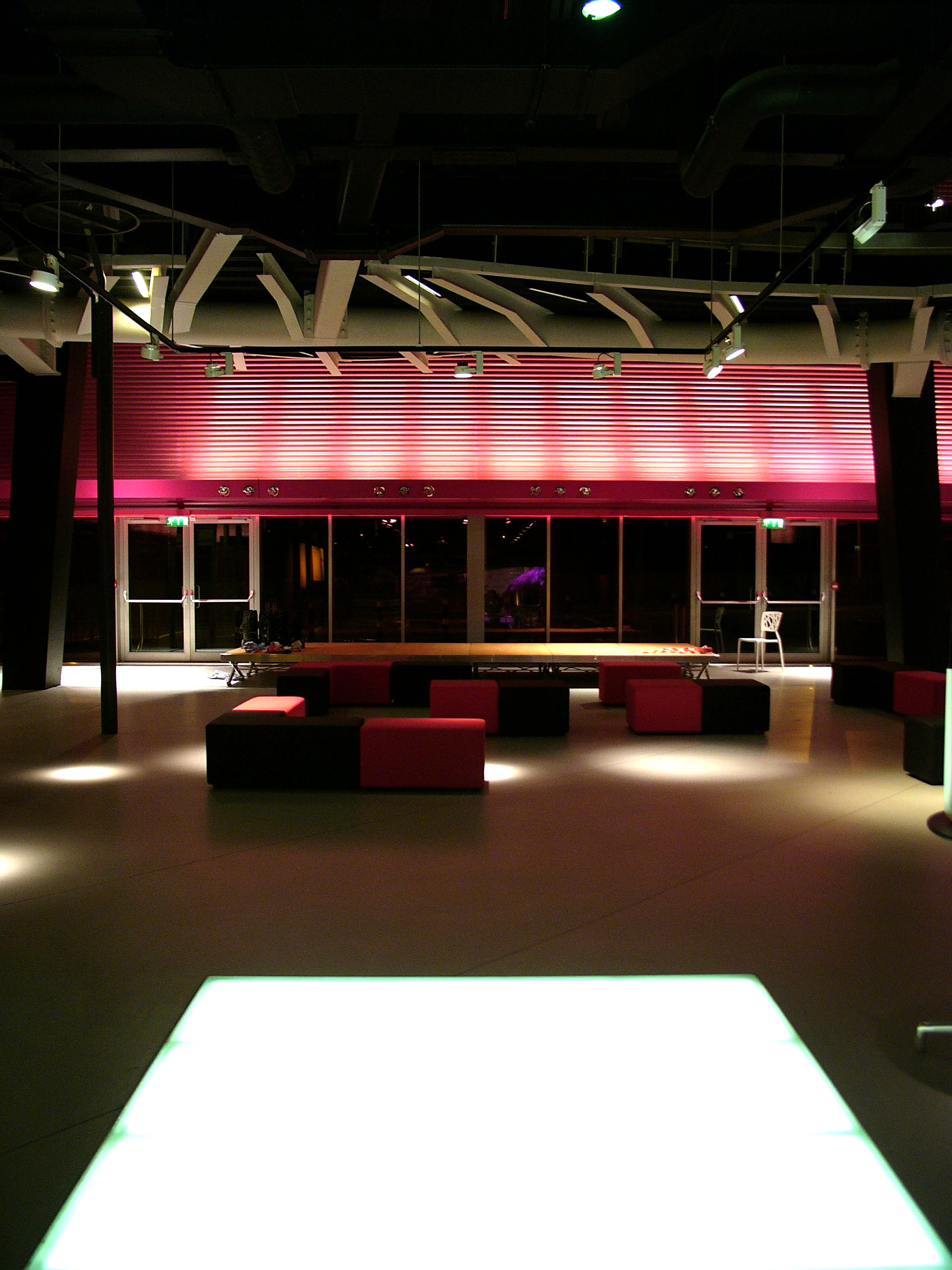
Pink Tank

== Awards ==
The project has been commended for its "exciting and vibrant lighting scheme". Kevan Shaw lighting Design won the Lighting Design Awards in the Public Buildings Category on 12 March 2009. KSLD stated that "The lighting is designed to be an integral part of the experience of the building. Both colour and dynamics are employed to create a remarkable series of events within the multiform interior." "The Public features specific treatments that range from the visual excitement of pink neon scrawled across the ceiling to the simple fluorescent fittings which are programmed to follow the flow of people and features in the "1001 Buildings to See Before You Die List"
