= Jason Pomeroy =

British architect, academic and author

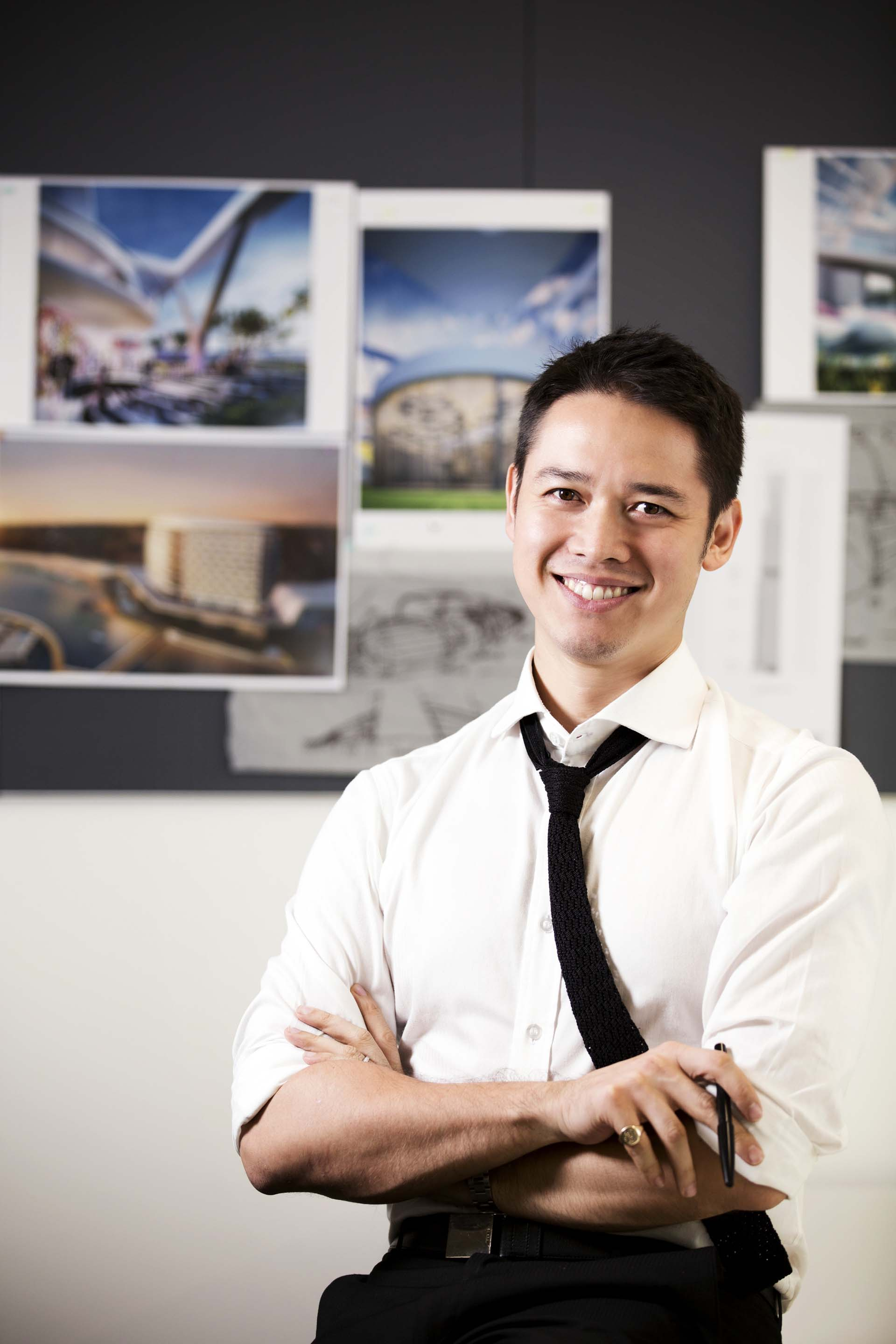
- Pomeroy in 2012
- Born: United Kingdom
- Education: Canterbury School of Architecture; Cambridge University; University of Westminster
- Occupation: Architect
- Practice: Pomeroy Studio, Singapore
- Buildings: Idea House, Malaysia; B House, Singapore
- Website: jasonpomeroy.sg

Jason Pomeroy is an architect, academic and author. He is the founder of sustainable design firm Pomeroy Studio and sustainable educator Pomeroy Academy.

== Life ==
Pomeroy studied at the Canterbury School of Architecture, got a master's degree at the University of Cambridge, and a PhD from the University of Westminster.

He has been teaching at James Cook University in Singapore, at the Università Iuav di Venezia in Italy, at the University of Nottingham, and the University of Cambridge in the United Kingdom.

== Projects ==
In 2010, Pomeroy designed an energy-efficient house for Sime Darby Property in Malaysia, which used electricity generated by solar panels and rainwater collected from the roof amongst other environmental technologies. This project, the Idea House, was partly based on the traditional Malay kampong. In 2011 the design received a Green Mark Platinum rating from the Building and Construction Authority.

Another ecologically-designed house ("B House") was built in Bukit Timah, in Singapore. "B House" drew on the architecture of colonial-era, black-and-white bungalows. It used the same principles of solar power and water management as the Idea House, designed to remain cool without air-conditioning and had a plus-energy approach. In 2014 the design received a Green Mark Platinum rating from the Building and Construction Authority.

== Television ==
Pomeroy presented seasons 1 and 2 of City Time Traveller, an architecture travel series, for Channel NewsAsia in 2014 and 2015. Also in 2015, he presented City Redesign, a four-part documentary on the architecture of Singapore, for the same channel.

His eight-part series on smart cities, Smart Cities 2.0, was shown in 2017. He has been featured in short and long format documentaries for BBC, CNBC, and National Geographic.

== Publications ==
Pomeroy has written four books:

- Idea House: Future Tropical Living Today (ORO Editions, 2011),
- The Skycourt and skygarden: greening the urban habitat (Routledge, 2014)
- Pod Off-Grid: Explorations Into Low-Energy Waterborne Communities ( ORO Editions, 2016)
- Cities of opportunities: connecting culture and innovation (ed.) (Routledge, 2020)
