= Marrago =

Aboriginal Australian people

The Marrago were an Aboriginal Australian people of the state of the Cape York Peninsula in northern Queensland. They may have been a subgroup of the Mayi-Kutuna.

== Country ==
Little is known of the details of the Marrago domain, which was in western Queensland, but Norman Tindale calculated, by default, that their tribal lands covered roughly 1,300 square miles (3,400 km^{2}) around the area of the Alexandra River.

Gavan Breen (1981) thought that they might have been a sub-group of the Mayi Kutuna people; Paul Memmott (1994) lists their language but gives no further detail. Their status is unconfirmed by the AIATSIS collection.

== Alternative names ==
- Ngarra
- Nga:rago (?)

== Sources ==
- Armit, W. E. (1886). "The Mouth of the Leichardt River" (PDF). In Curr, Edward Micklethwaite (ed.). The Australian race: its origin, languages, customs, place of landing in Australia and the routes by which it spread itself over the continent. Vol. 2. Melbourne: J. Ferres. pp. 300–305.
- Tindale, Norman Barnett (1974). "Marrago (QLD)". Aboriginal Tribes of Australia: Their Terrain, Environmental Controls, Distribution, Limits, and Proper Names. Australian National University Press. ISBN 978-0-708-10741-6.
