= Kevin O'Brien (architect) =

Australian architect (born 1972)

Kevin O’Brien (born 1972) is an architect practising in Queensland, Australia. He is noted for drawing on indigenous concepts of space in his work.

== Early life and education ==
O'Brien was born in Melbourne, Australia. He graduated from the University of Queensland with a Bachelor of Architecture degree in 1995. In 2006, he studied Aboriginality and Architecture, gaining a Master of Philosophy under Paul Memmott.

== Career ==
O'Brien also established Kevin O'Brien Architects (KOA) in Brisbane, and has completed architectural projects throughout several states in Australia. In 2000, he travelled around the Pacific Rim as a Churchill Fellow to investigate regional construction strategies in indigenous communities.

O'Brien directed the Finding Country Exhibition at the 13th Venice Architecture Biennale in 2012, and he was appointed as a Professor of Design at the Queensland University of Technology.

In 2014, he was a juror at the Australian Institute of Architects' 2014 Brisbane Regional Architecture Awards.

Kevin O'Brien Architects merged with BVN Architecture in 2018.

== Notable projects ==
=== Finding Country Exhibition (2012) ===
O'Brien's "Finding Country" Exhibition, focused on the tension between concepts of City and Country in an Australian context, and was exhibited at the 13th International Architecture Exhibit in Venice, Italy in 2012. A large drawing highlighting the city method of title management (by labelling places such as parks or roads), was emptied through a 50% population reduction as a way into revealing Country as something found; the exhibition developed from discussions with Michael Markham in 2005.

=== Archibald Street House (2012) ===
Construction began on the Archibald Street House in August 2009, and reached practical completion in 2011. It is a two-storey residential building in Brisbane, which has a 3.5 kW solar power system that has produced enough energy to maintain a household of four. The building combines a house and a studio with a central courtyard. It is built using concrete and timber. Designed to minimise energy costs, the house efficiently uses new insulation techniques by employing water and solar collections. To achieve an effective energy consumption, the house was designed to make use of building orientation, ventilation access, thermal mass, insulation systems and energy-economical openings.

=== Woorabinda State School Library (2011) ===
This project began its construction in 2009, poured on site concrete tilt panels, with steel structure, and clear finished plywood linings in the interiors with the completion in 2011. It was noted as a regional commendation for public buildings. The Woollam construction team was led by Chris Battersby. In February 2013, O'Brien received the QLD Architecture Award: Central Queensland Regional Commendation.

== Other projects ==
Year	Project name and Location
2013	Casino Aboriginal Medical Service, Casino, NSW
2013	GUMURRII student support, Griffith University, Gold Coast, QLD
2012	GUMURRII staff offices, Griffith University, Nathan, QLD
2012	Finding Country Exhibition, 13th Venice Architecture Biennale
2011	Indigenous Family Hubs and Long Day-Care Centres, Doomadgee and Mornington Island, QLD
2010	Indigenous Family Hubs and Short Day-Care Centres, Mareeba, Mt Isa, Ipswich, QLD
2010	Woorabinda State School, Library and Administration, Woorabinda, QLD
2010	AGNEW School Library, Brisbane, QLD
2010	Art Facilities for Lockhart River, Mornington Island, QLD
2010	Retail Store and Offices, Lockhart River, QLD
2009	Cherbourg Retail and Office Hub, Cherbourg, QLD
2009	Centre of Excellence in Indigenous Health Care, Inala, Brisbane, QLD
2008	Wellers Hill, General Learning 8, Brisbane, QLD
2008	Remote Indigenous Housing Design Standards, QLD
2007	Gallang Place ATSI Counselling Services (Refurbishment), Brisbane, QLD
2007	Krurungal ATSI Welfare and Health Services (Refurbishment), Gold Coast, QLD
2007	Carbal Aboriginal Medical Centre, Toowoomba, QLD
2005	2nd Chance Residential Facility, Northern Rivers NSW
2004	Cape York Institute (Refurbishment), Cairns, QLD

== Awards ==
Year	Awarded Project
2013	Australian Institute of Architects, National Award for International Architecture: Finding Country Exhibition (jointly with Finding Country Collective and Venti di Cultura)
2013	QLD Australian Institute of Architects, Karl Langer Award for Urban Design: Finding Country Exhibition
2013	QLD Australian Institute of Architects, Commercial Award: Lockhart River Retail Store and Offices
2013	QLD Australian Institute of Architects, Central QLD regional commendation for Public Buildings: Woorabinda State School
2013	QLD Australian Institute of Architects, Brisbane regional commendation for Residential building: Archibald Street House
2012–13	Wesfarmers Fellow, National Gallery of Australia
2011	British Council Arts Accelerate Recipient
2008	Queensland Premier's Reconciliation Awards, emerging business finalist
2006	Design Institute of Australia, Exhibition Commendation: Dandiiri Maiwar at Queensland Museum
2003	NSW Timber Awards, Environmental Commitment: Wilcannia Health Service
