= Hôtel du département des Bouches-du-Rhône =

Regional government headquarters building in Marseille

Departmental Council of Bouches-du-Rhône
- Hôtel du département des Bouches-du-Rhône
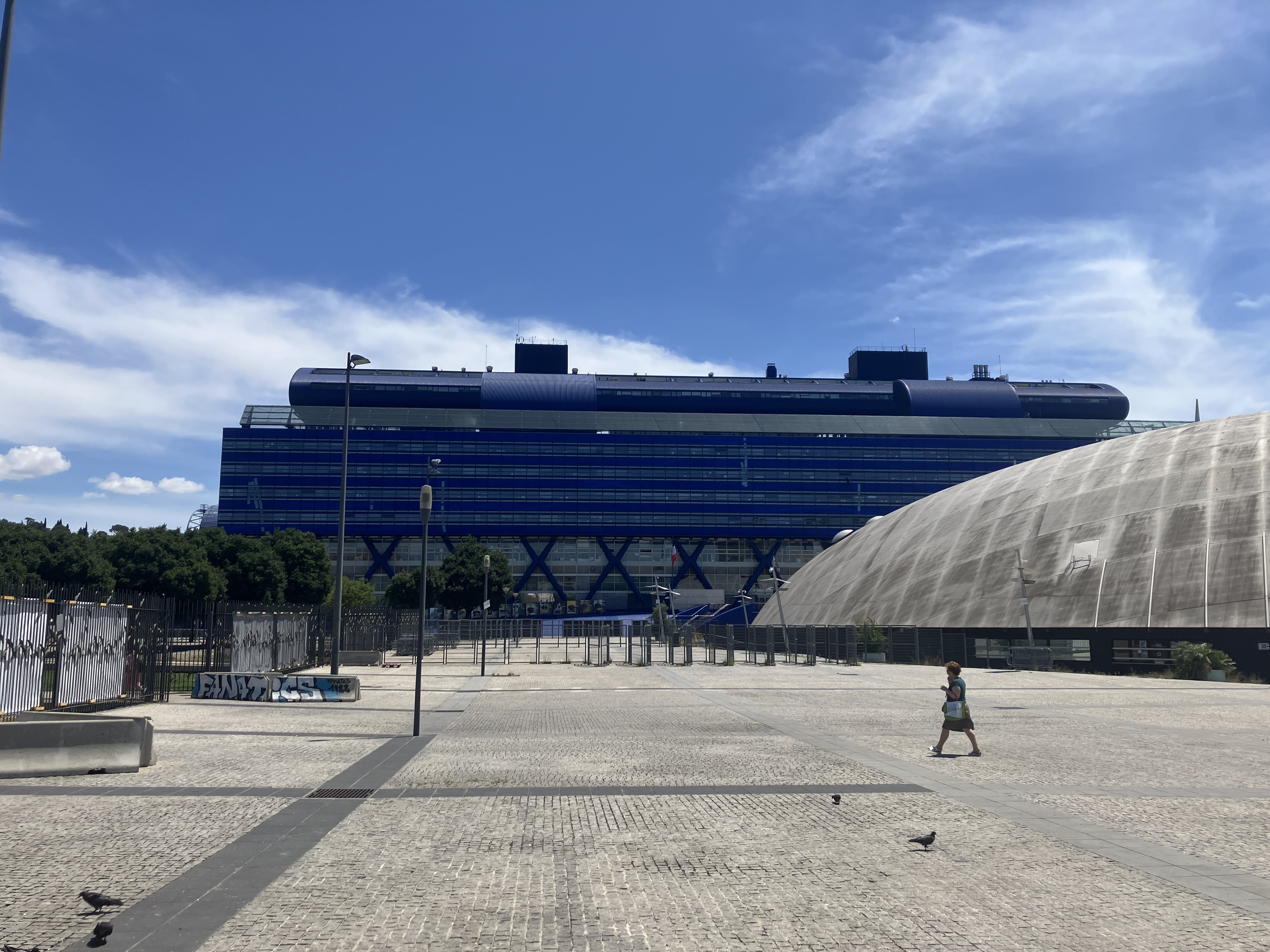
- Headquarters building for the Departmental Council of Bouches-du-Rhône in Marseille, designed by Alsop & Störmer
- Interactive map of the Departmental Council of Bouches-du-Rhône area
- Alternative names: Le Grand Bleu, Vaisseau Bleu, Le Bateau Bleu

General information
- Architectural style: High-tech
- Location: 52 Avenue de Saint-Just, Marseille, France
- Coordinates: 43.3150°N 5.4059°E
- Current tenants: Conseil Départemental des Bouches-du-Rhône
- Construction started: 1991
- Completed: 1994
- Inaugurated: September 1994
- Client: Conseil fédéral des Bouches-du-Rhône

Height
- Height: 66

Technical details
- Floor area: 80,000 m^{2} (860,000 sq ft)

Design and construction
- Architect: Will Alsop
- Architecture firm: Alsop & Störmer
- Structural engineer: Ove Arup & Partners
- Other designers: Brian Clarke
- Awards and prizes: RIBA Worldwide Projects Award (1997), RIBA Civic & Community Architecture Award (1995), Palmarés Award for Architecture (1995)

Website
- www.departement13.fr

The Hôtel du département des Bouches-du-Rhône, known as Le Grand Bleu, is the headquarters and council chambers of the Conseil General of Bouches-du-Rhône in Marseille, France. The Sterling Prize-nominated building, noted for its distinct ultramarine colour, was designed by architects Will Alsop and Jan Störmer as the new regional government headquarters. Located north of Marseille's city centre, in the Saint-Just district, the High-Tech structure was designed to combine dispersed administrative functions into a single site. The winner of an international architecture competition launched in 1989, which in its final round saw Alsop and John Lyall compete versus established architectural practice Foster + Partners, the Hôtel du département was designed with architectural artist Brian Clarke, who conceived the colouration and treatment of the facade as a “skin of art”. The landmark High-tech building, the largest public building to be constructed in the French provinces in the twentieth century, was built in 26 months, opening in 1994.

== History ==
=== Competition ===
At the time of the brief for the competition, the department council had its administrative functions dispersed over 23 locations, and the centralisation of these activities was a key element in the design considerations for the open competition, which took place in two stages. Prior to the close of the competition, Alsop and Störmer's stage one proposal model was exhibited at the Arc-en-Rêve Centre d'Architecture, Bordeaux, in 1991; the final version of the design, coloured blue by artist Brian Clarke, and with the facade artwork resolved, was exhibited after the building's construction at The Mayor Gallery in London, and the Tony Shafrazi Gallery in New York.

=== Development ===
Construction was begun on the site in Marseille's northern suburbs in 1991, and was completed in 1994; the building was officially inaugurated in September of that year. The Hôtel du Département is the largest public building in Marseille.

==== Colour ====
The building developed its visual identity through the design process; Clarke and Alsop's final version, submitted as the winning competition entry, shifted from an all-white to an all-blue scheme. The completed building is externally clad in blue-coloured glass, rendered through a novel technique of ceramic glazing devised by Clarke, to produce a 'skin of art' across the entire building; along the west elevation is a 1,200-square-metre (13,000 sq ft) linear composition by Clarke in bands of ceramic glaze screenprinted onto the panels of the facade. The colour, which approximates Yves Klein blue,is cited by the architects as the portion of the design process that took the most time and consideration to resolve.

== Structure ==
The building is formed of two administrative blocks linked by an atrial space, and a separate building, the 'Deliberatif' or debating chamber, abuting onto the two blocks. The building is notable for its distinctive X-shaped concrete support columns or pilotis, cast in situ.
