= Country-centred design =

Design methodology of Indigenous peoples in Australia

Country-centred design, also spelt Country Centred Design, is a design methodology of Indigenous peoples in Australia. It is a means of ensuring that the design of the built environment happens with the Aboriginal or Torres Strait Islander concept of "Country" at the centre of the design. Country-centred design stands as a counterpoint to human-centred design.

== The concept of Country ==
Embedded in the Country-centred design methodology is the Indigenous experience of Country. This has a particular and distinct meaning, which is different to the Western understanding of country (with a lowercase "c"). Danièle Hromek, a spatial designer of Budawang/Murramarang/Dhurga/Yuin and Burrier/Dharawal heritage from the New South Wales South Coast, explains this as follows:

In the Aboriginal sense of the word, Country relates to the nation or cultural group and land that they/we belong to, yearn for, find healing from and will return to. However, Country means much more than land, it is their/our place of origin in cultural, spiritual and literal terms. It includes not only land but also skies and waters.

Country is a wholistic worldview that incorporates human, non-human and all the natural systems that connect them.

== Country-centred design methodology ==
Developed intergenerationally and communally over many generations of Indigenous peoples, the Country-centred design methodology is "owned" by Indigenous peoples, and embodied through Indigenous designers. It positions Country as the guide for design processes. It inherently includes the relationships between the various elements of Country, community, non-humans and people, and understands the connections and kinships between all that share space. The methodology is interpreted differently dependent on the spatial practitioner and their individual relationships to Country, culture and community. It has been described as "a process used and created by First Peoples over generations through their care and management of Country".

The methodology is also referred to as "Country centred design", "Country centric design", "Country-led design" and "privileging Country in design".

== Publication and dissemination ==
Contemporary Indigenous architects and designers in Australia have used the term "Country Centred Design" to describe this methodology since the 1990s. More recently, the methodology has been disseminated within the Australian architecture and design communities through a range of publications and public discussions. Led by Indigenous architects, designers and scholars, these initiatives aim to increase knowledge among the larger community of built environment practitioners and to ensure that Indigenous knowledge and methodologies are embedded in the design of the Australian built environment.

In 2025, the First Nations Advisory Committee to the Australian Institute of Architects published their understandings of the term Country-Centred Design:

Country Centred Design is a design methodology of First Nations Peoples. Country Centred Design integrates relationships, as well as tangible and intangible aspects of Country, in design outcomes. Country Centred Design is a process that enables deep history understandings, care for Country, stewardship activities, kinship, culture and cultural practices, spiritual and Indigenous ways of knowing to be integrated into the design process.

It is a means of ensuring that the design of the built environment happens with Country at the centre of the design, and in doing so, all decisions made in the design process are filtered through a consideration of Country. Country Centred Design stands as a counterpoint to human centred design.

Human Centred Design is a design methodology that places humans at the centre of the design process. It focuses on humans first, involving them in all steps of the process. Human Centred Design works to solve problems for people, seeking to deeply understand the perspectives, needs, experiences and behaviours of humans and caters to their desires and challenges through design.

The New South Wales Government Architect published a Connecting with Country Framework in 2023, which references taking a Country-centred approach. They provide "guidance to support project teams who engage with Aboriginal communities and form a Country-centred approach to built environment projects." It describes the importance of building meaningful relationships with communities, and creating places of cultural safety.

In 2017 Anthony McKnight, Awabakal, Gumaroi, and Yuin scholar, published his thesis titled "Singing up Country in academia: teacher education academics and preservice teachers' experience with Yuin Country", in which he describes Country as "decentr[ing] the human authorship privilege of overseer, creator, controller, implementer, and owner".

In a 2018 article, Dillon Kombumerri, an architect of Yugembir heritage, described a process of design that is "very much country-centred, that talk[s] to the deep history of country." In a 2020 article in Architecture Australia, Kombumerri describes Country-centred design in relation to traditional greetings:

The traditional form of greeting is not saying "hello" – that's a human-centred approach. Traditional communication protocols are about sharing where you're from and who your mob is. The human-centred approach needs to shift to be Country centred. My advice to architects is to ground yourself within Country and community.

The New South Wales Government Architect 2020 discussion paper, Designing with Country, builds on the earlier forum of the same name held in Sydney in 2018. It aims to provide a clear guide to support built environment practitioners to "respond to Aboriginal culture and heritage responsibly, appropriately and respectfully". It is part of a larger program of activity from the Government Architect to ensure that sensitive sites are respected, and to support strong Aboriginal culture in the Australian built environment. This document also articulates the contrast between Country-Centred Design and Human-Centred Design:

Prioritising people and their needs when designing is widely regarded as fundamental in contemporary design and planning. However, appreciating an Indigenous or Aboriginal worldview suggests that there are limitations imposed by an entirely human-centred approach to design. If people and their needs are at the 'centre' of design considerations, then the landscape and nature are reduced to second order priorities. If design and planning processes considered natural systems that include people, animals, resources and plants equally – similar to an Aboriginal world view – this could make a significant contribution to a more sustainable future world.

Country-centred design was the topic of the annual Monash University Whyte Lecture in 2020, given by Angie Abdilla and Pia Waugh.

== See also ==
- Indigenous architecture
- Designing with Country
