= Sandwell College =

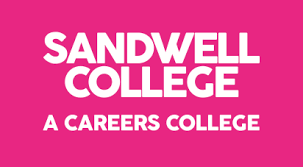

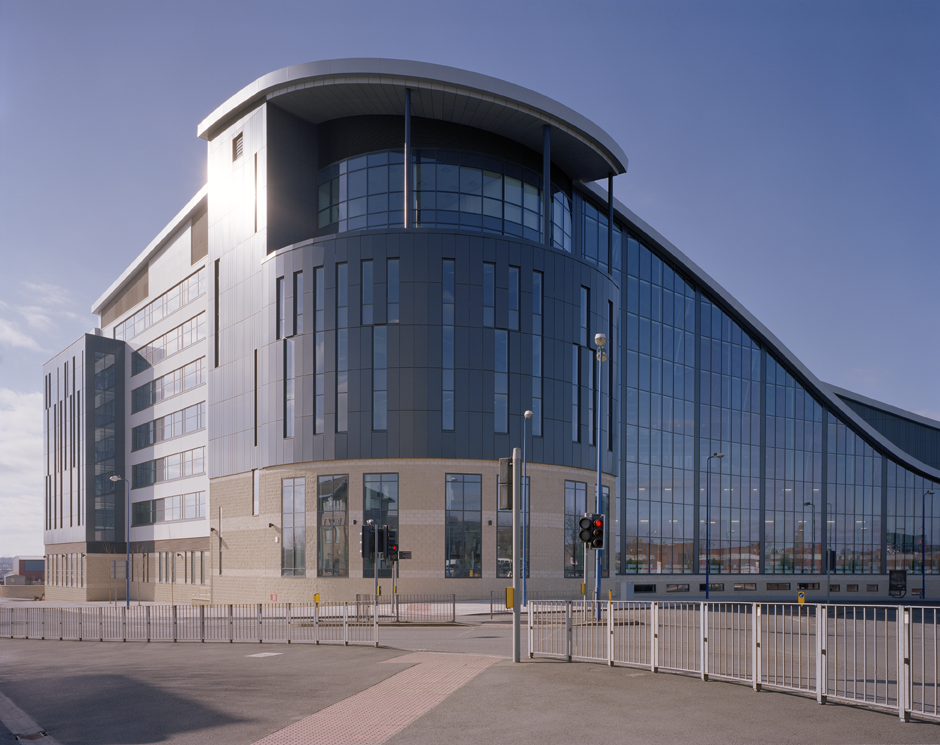
- Central Campus, Sandwell College

Location
- 1 Spon Lane; West Bromwich, West Midlands, B70 6AW; England
- Coordinates: 52.515°N 1.991°W

Information
- Type: Further Education
- Established: 1986
- Local authority: Sandwell Metropolitan Borough Council
- Department for Education URN: 130479 Tables
- Ofsted: Reports
- Principal: Lisa Capper
- Gender: Mixed
- Age: 16+
- Website: sandwell.ac.uk

Sandwell College is the only College of Further Education in Sandwell, West Midlands, England. It predominantly serves Sandwell, West Birmingham and adjacent areas of Dudley, Walsall and Wolverhampton. Following seven years of growth in student numbers, some 6000 16–18-year-old students currently study in the college.

The college's £77 million 'Central Campus' was opened on Spon Lane in West Bromwich in March 2012; it houses facilities for teaching a wide variety of skills-based courses to school leavers and adults.

== Central Campus ==
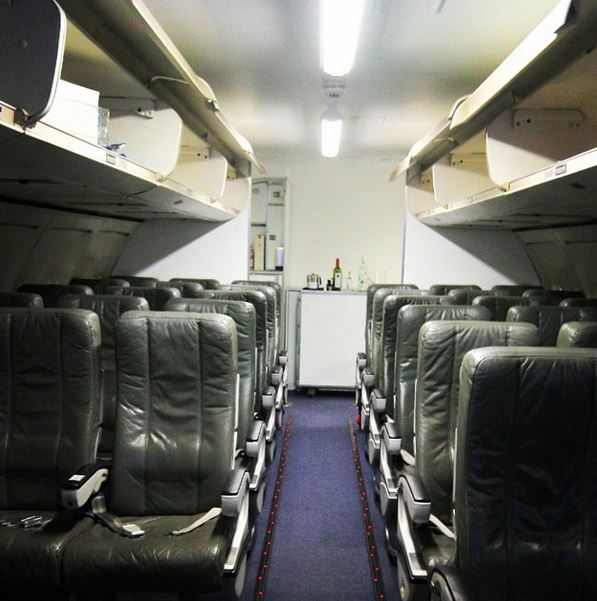
A Boeing 737 Aircraft Cabin used for Aircraft Cabin Crew Courses

Central Campus is an eight-storey building, underpinning the regeneration of both West Bromwich and Sandwell borough. Features included in the new college include a practice dental surgery for training nurses and a life-size Aircraft cabin to support Airline Cabin Crew courses. Other facilities include engineering and construction workshops, photographic, fashion and dance studios, a full theatre, hairdressing and beauty salons, a four-court sports hall and gymnasium, computing and multimedia suites and a two-floor automotive workshop.

The campus is situated immediately next to West Bromwich bus station and West Bromwich Central tram stop (on the Birmingham to Wolverhampton light railway). The building itself is recognisable by its 'ski jump' roof.

== Courses ==
The main area of activity within the college is the provision of Level 1, 2 and 3 courses to 16–18-year-olds. Courses include the following:

- A Levels,
- Animal Care,
- Art & Design,
- Automotive Mechanics and Bodywork,
- Barbering,
- Beauty Therapy,
- Business Studies,
- Cabin Crew,
- Carpentry & Joinery,
- Childcare,
- Computer Games Design,
- Computing,
- Counselling,
- Employability skills,
- Electrical installation,
- Engineering,
- ESOL,
- Fashion,
- Film and Media Production,
- Hairdressing,
- Health and Social Care,
- Health & Safety in the Workplace,
- IT Skills and Office Administration,
- Leadership and Management,
- Motorsports Engineering,
- Multimedia Design,
- Imaging,
- Graphics and Animation,
- Multimedia Programming,
- Musical Theatre,
- Music Performance,
- Music Production,
- Painting & Decorating,
- Plastering,
- Performing Arts,
- Photography,
- Plumbing,
- Public Services,
- Sports Studies,
- Supported Learning,
- Teacher Education,
- Tiling,
- Travel & Tourism
- Web Design

Most areas of teaching offer Higher Education qualifications such as the Foundation Degree and HND.

In addition, several hundred school leavers study for A Levels and university in Central St. Michael Sixth Form. Central St. Michael Sixth Form offers some 25 different A Level choices.

== Apprenticeship provision ==
Areas covered:

- Business Administration,
- Carpentry,
- Customer Service,
- Dental Nursing,
- Engineering,
- Health and Social Care,
- Light Vehicle Mechanics,
- Mechanical,
- Electrical,
- Trim (MET),
- Painting & Decorating,
- Plastering,
- Vehicle Body Repair,
- Vehicle Refinishing

== Quality ==
The college has pass rates that are variable across courses.

The college does not have a current Ofsted grade, this is as a result of the merger with Cadbury Sixth Form College in 2018. The newly merged college will be inspected under the Ofsted EIF 2019 within three years of the merger date.

== History ==
Sandwell College can trace its history back to the first local technical schools created by the philanthropy of Black Country industrial 'giants' in the mid-19th Century.

Messrs. Chance Brothers Limited, whose factory produced the million square feet of glass for the Crystal Palace at the Great Exhibition of 1851, established a school on Spon Lane, West Bromwich in the mid-1840s.

By the 1860s, an enlightened curriculum provided factory workers (including hundreds of boys aged 14) with classes in Reading, Writing and Arithmetic but also Freehand and Mechanical Drawing, Magnetism, Electricity and Heat, Chemistry and Mechanics.

In 2004, the Birmingham Post & Mail indicated that a debt-ridden college accrued a £12 million deficit in over two years leading to a fraud investigation by West Midlands Police and the loss of 100 staff. This heralded the start of a new phase under a new management team. The college has been expanding rapidly since 2009 and has more than doubled 16–18 learner numbers, helped by the move to the new Central Campus.

The Pound Road site of Sandwell College, which had originally been the base of Oldbury Technical College, later known as Warley College of Technology, was demolished in the summer of 2012 to make way for a new housing estate called College Gate.

The old nine-storey college building in High Street, which was originally West Bromwich College, was demolished in 2013 after dominating the town centre's landscape for some 50 years.

== Central Saint Michael's Sixth Form ==
In May 2013, it was announced that Sandwell Council was in discussions with Sandwell College regarding the potential repurposing of the arts centre 'The Public'.

In November 2013, it was confirmed that Sandwell College would be moving its sixth form into the Public. The building was re-fitted over the following year and re-opened to as Central Sixth opened in September 2014. It was officially opened by Prince Edward The Earl of Wessex, on 1 October 2014. Sandwell College merger with Cadbury College in 2018 provided an additional sixth form campus to the college. The college renamed and rebranded the Central Sixth campus in West Bromwich to become Central Saint Michael's Sixth Form occupying the same premises as the previously named Central Sixth Campus.
