= Canterbury School of Architecture =

Architecture school in Canterbury, England

Coordinates: 51.27489°N 1.09082°E

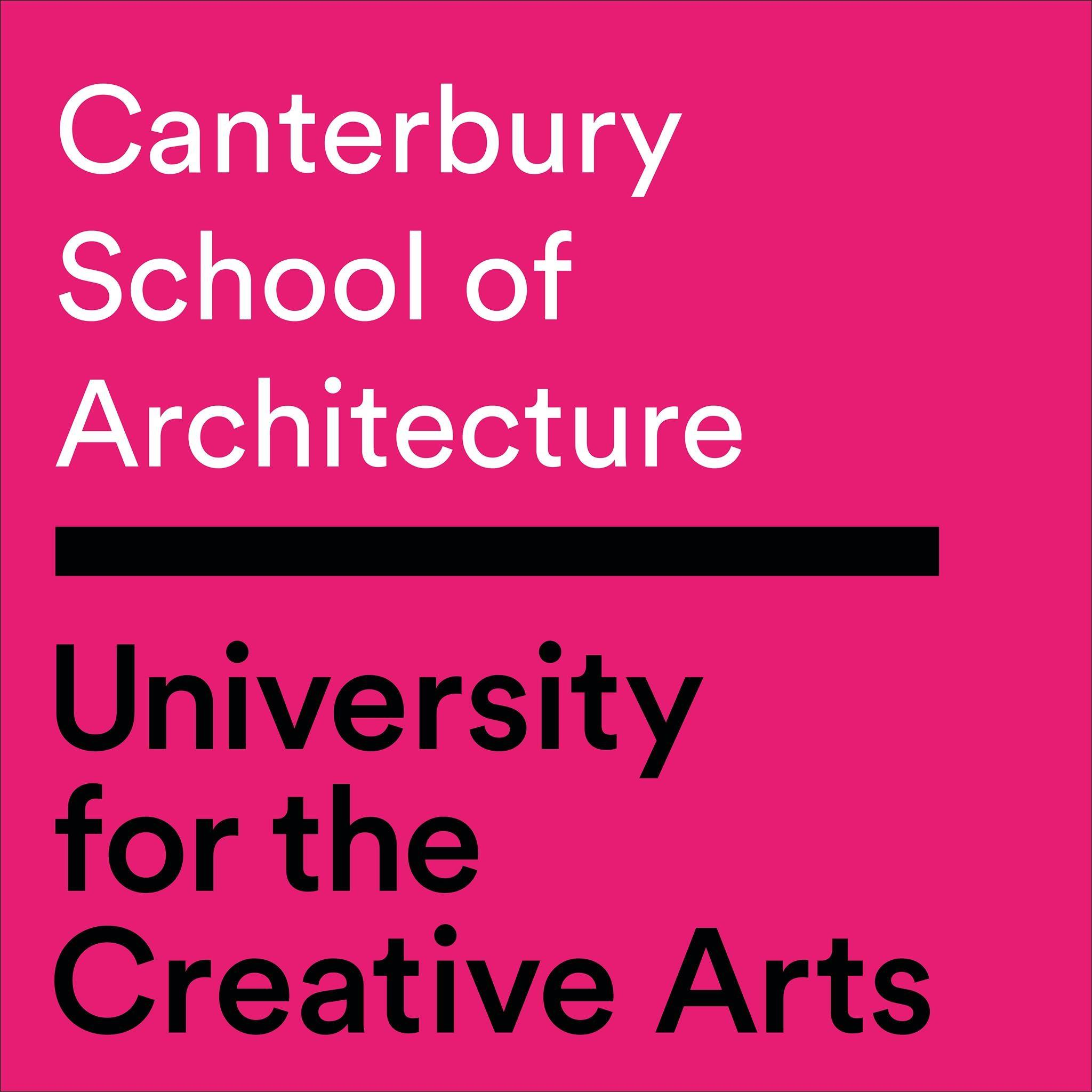
- Canterbury; England

Information
- Professor of Architecture: Professor Will Alsop, OBE, RA
- Head of School: Colin Holden
- Website: uca.ac.uk

The Canterbury School of Architecture (CSA) which was founded in 1952 is a leading architecture school in the United Kingdom and is a department of the University for the Creative Arts in England. It has been listed within the top five architecture schools in the United Kingdom. The CSA teaches degree programmes at undergraduate, postgraduate and research levels and in 2013, Will Alsop became Professor of Architecture at CSA and continued to support the school until his death in 2018.

The school also offers a guest lecture series called Multistory which allows students to engage with industry experts and professionals of the architectural world. The CSA offers an undergraduate course (BA (Hons)) which has exemption to the RIBA and prescription to the ARB Part One exam; a professional postgraduate course (MArch) which offers exemption to the RIBA and prescription to the ARB Part Two exam and also other undergraduate, postgraduate and research degrees in other specialisms of architecture and interior architecture.

The school was previously part of UCA's predecessor colleges, UCCA (the University College for the Creative Arts), and KIAD (the Kent Institute of Art and Design).
