= Will Alsop =

British architect (1947–2018)

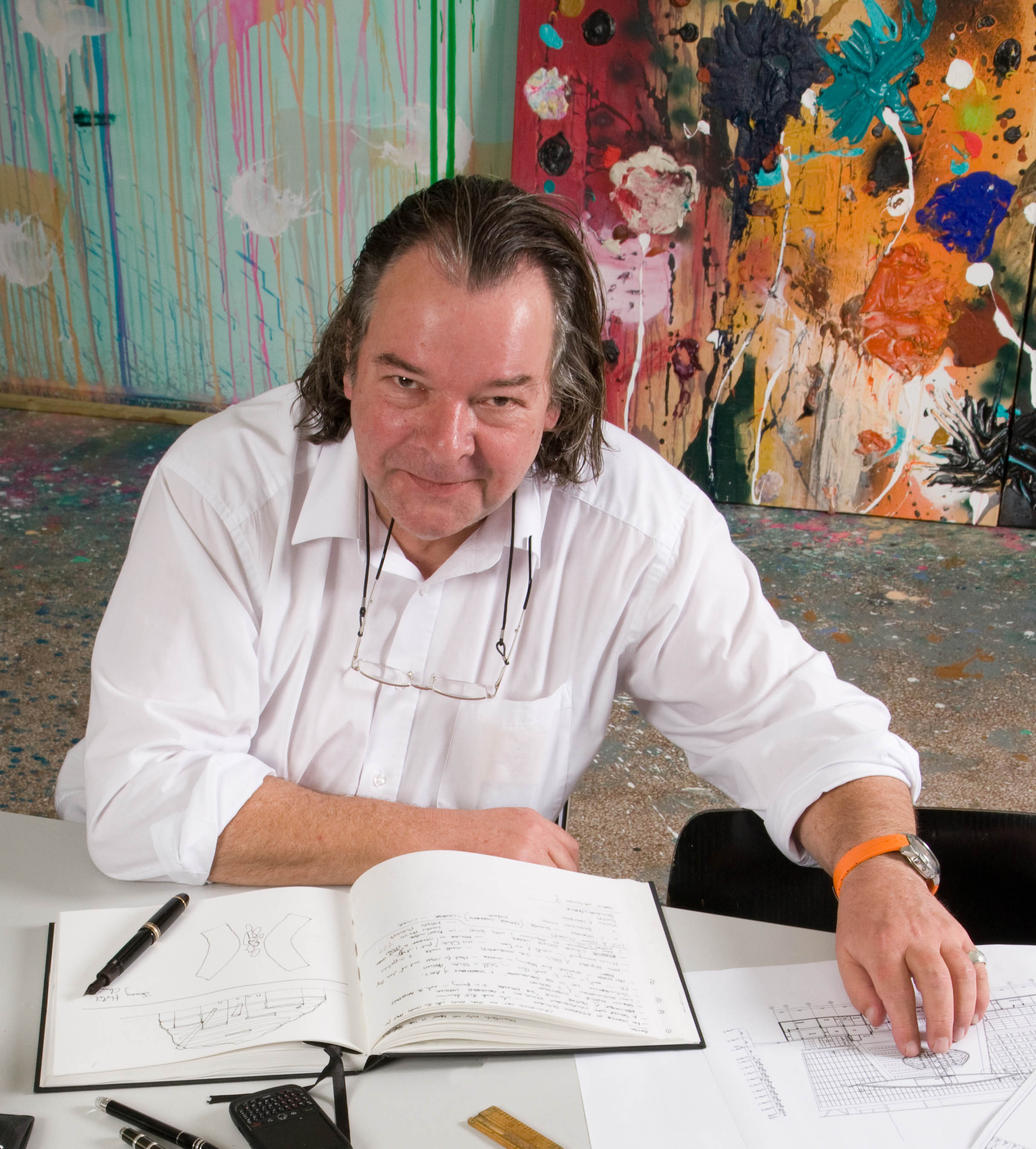
- Alsop in his Battersea office at All Design
- Born: William Allen Alsop; 12 December 1947; Northampton, Northamptonshire, England, UK
- Died: 12 May 2018 (aged 70)
- Education: Architectural Association School of Architecture
- Occupation: Architect
- Awards: Stirling Prize (2000); RIBA Worldwide Award (2004); Civic Trust Award (2003, 2006); RIBA Regional Award (London) (2006)
- Practice: Alsop and Störmer; aLL Design
- Buildings: Hôtel du département des Bouches-du-Rhône; Peckham Library, Peckham; Sharp Centre for Design, Ontario College of Art & Design, Toronto (2004); Blizard Building, Whitechapel; Gao Yang cruise terminal development, Shanghai; Palestra London; North Greenwich tube station; Goldsmiths College London
- Projects: Yonkers Power Plant project; Clarke Quay Redevelopment project

William Allen Alsop OBE RA (12 December 1947 – 12 May 2018) was a British architect and Professor of Architecture at University for the Creative Arts's Canterbury School of Architecture.

He was responsible for several distinctive and controversial modernist buildings which are usually distinguished by their use of bright colours and unusual avant-garde forms. In 2000, Alsop won the Stirling Prize, the most prestigious architecture award in the United Kingdom, for the Peckham Library in London.

== Biography ==
Alsop always wanted to be an architect, even before he really knew what architects did; when he was six years old, he designed a house for his mother to live in – its most striking specification was that it had to be built in New Zealand. When he was 16 his father, an accountant, died, and being bored with school, at the private Eaglehurst College he left to work for an architect, doing his A-levels at evening classes.

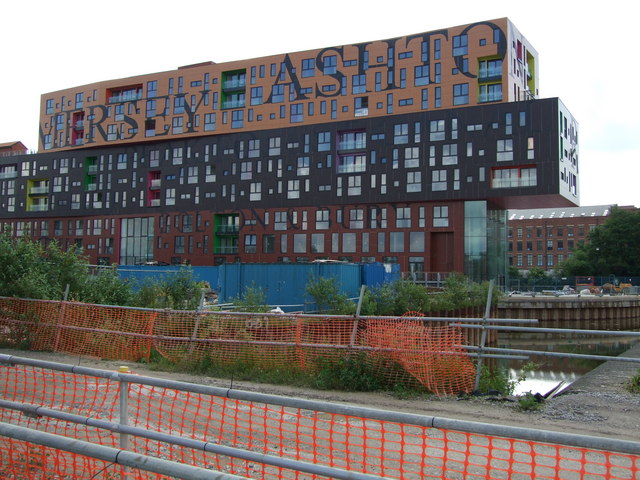
Will Alsop's apartment block at New Islington, Manchester (2009), is situated alongside the Ashton Canal, and the facades feature the names of local waterways. 9 storeys high, the building has been said to look like three potato chips on top of each other.

He was greatly influenced by his drawing tutor, Henry Bird while at foundation course at Northampton Art School. He recalled how he was taught to draw by him.

He gave me a brick, told me to draw it and promptly left the room. I proceeded to draw it with all its shadows. On his return he went into a rage and chastised me for destroying the vision with shading, shouting: 'What is wrong with a simple line?' He insisted that I redo the drawing with line only so that I could begin to see the brick and its proportions. I drew that brick for two three hour sessions per week, line only, for three months. Eventually, he admitted that I had mastered the brick and I was allowed to progress onto the tin can.

Alsop then studied at the Architectural Association School of Architecture where at 23 he entered the competition to design the Centre Georges Pompidou in Paris and came second to the eventual winners, Richard Rogers & Renzo Piano. He worked briefly for Maxwell Fry and Jane Drew, a couple who had been instrumental in introducing modernism to Britain in the 1930s, then joined Cedric Price for four years.

After a short period with Roderick Ham, in 1981 Alsop set up a practice, Alsop & Lyall, with his classmate John Lyall in Hammersmith. Jan Störmer later joined the practice and a decade later, in 1991, the practice was renamed Alsop & Störmer after Lyall's departure.

Alsop's first major commission was a swimming pool for Sheringham in Norfolk in 1984, followed by a visitor centre for Cardiff Bay. Thereafter he worked on a number of projects in Germany, including the Hamburg Ferry Terminal. In 1992, Alsop came first, against competitor Norman Foster, in the competition to design the Hôtel du département des Bouches-du-Rhône (the county government office of Bouches-du-Rhône) in Marseille, France. The building, now considered a major work of late 20th century architecture and a Marseille landmark, nicknamed Le Grand Bleu, was designed by Alsop and Störmer, and developed its visual identity through the design process in collaboration with the architectural artist Brian Clarke, with the completed building externally clad in Yves Klein blue glass, with one elevation formed of a 1,200 m^{2} artwork by Clarke screenprinted in ceramic glaze onto the facade. Alsop and Störmer divided into separate practices in 2000, with Alsop renaming the practice Alsop Architects.

Alsop admitted to never being very good at handling finances, and his practice went through several difficult periods, including the cancellation in June 2004 of plans to build a "Fourth Grace" to be built on Liverpool's Pier Head waterfront. Since 2001–2002, three historical buildings at the Pier Head in Liverpool have been known as the "Three Graces": they are the Royal Liver Building (1908–11) by Walter Aubrey Thomas, the Cunard Building (1914–16) by Willinck & Thicknesse with Arthur J. Davis, and the Port of Liverpool Building (1903–07) by Briggs & Wolstenholme with Hobbs & Thornely – the so-called "Cloud Building" – officially because of rising costs and unrealistic design.

In early 2006, Alsop sold his practice to a design conglomerate called the SMC Group to concentrate on architecture.

After leaving ARCHIAL (formerly Alsop Architects, then SMC Alsop), he joined RMJM's London Headquarters as International Principal on 1 October 2009. The office's name was "Will Alsop at RMJM". Alsop's latest practice was called All Design and had practices in London and Chongqing. Alsop's London office was located in Battersea.

Alsop was a tutor of sculpture at Central Saint Martins College of Art and Design in London for several years, and held many other academic posts, among others at the Vienna University of Technology, Universities of London and Hannover, and actively promoted the artistic contribution to built environments.

In 2013, Alsop became Professor of Architecture at the University for the Creative Arts's Canterbury School of Architecture.

Alsop was made an Officer of the Order of the British Empire (OBE), and was elected to the Royal Academy on 18 May 2000.

== Architectural style ==
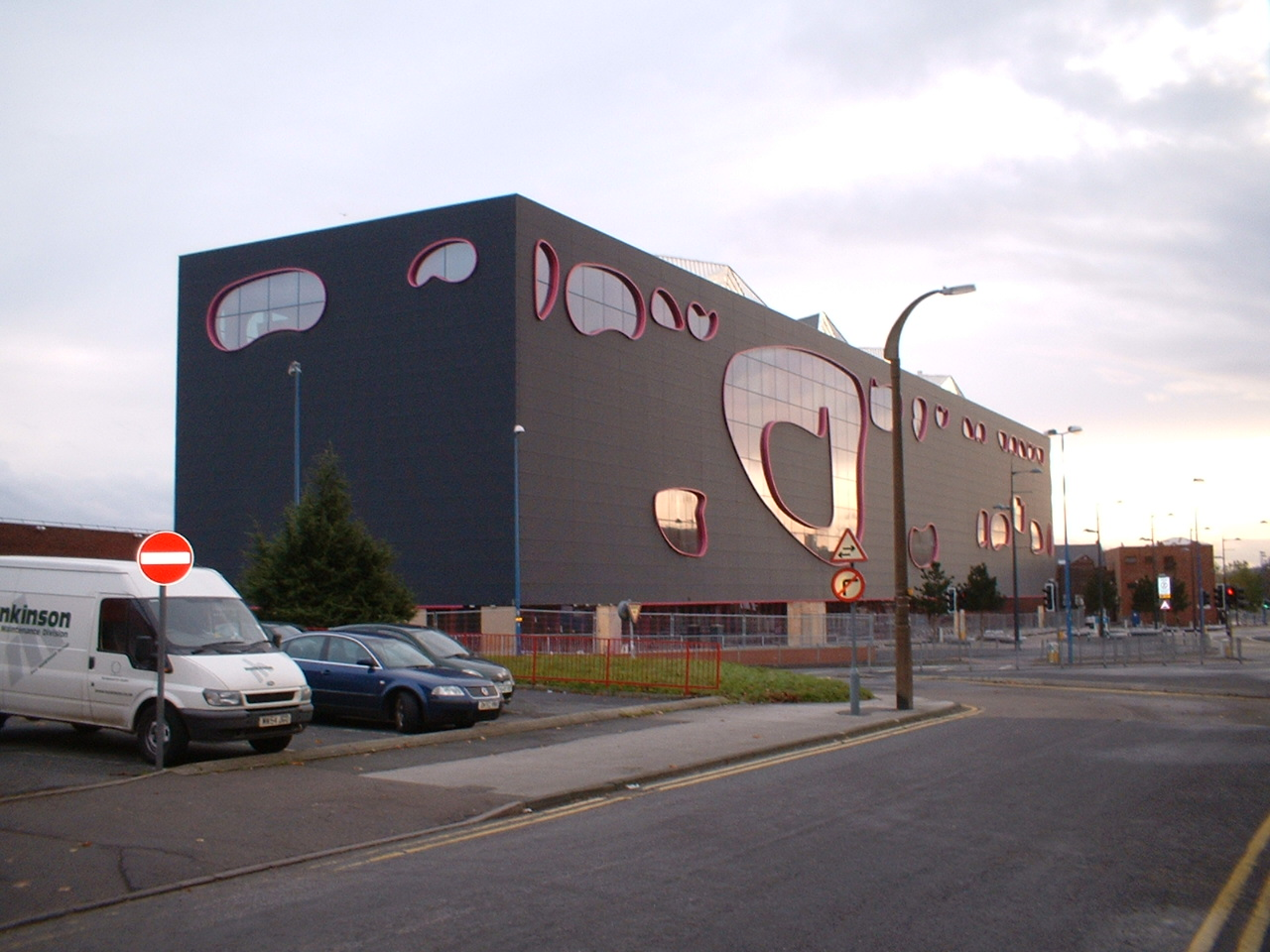
THEPUBLIC, West Bromwich. The design has been likened to a massive fish tank or a Friesian cow.

Alsop's architectural heroes were Le Corbusier, Sir John Soane, John Vanbrugh and Mies van der Rohe. His avant-garde, modernist buildings are usually distinguished by their vibrant use of bright colour and unusual forms. Before Alsop begins to work on a new project, he uses painting to clear his mind, think freely and create an uncontaminated design approach.

"One of the reasons for painting is that you are not really in control of what you are doing – and that interests me a lot. Instead of having a specific starting point, which perhaps, in architectural terms, would lead through to a series of logical thoughts working towards a designed building, you can start anywhere."

For him, the act of painting together with working closely with the client and the local community are necessary ingredients in urban design and architecture.

In 2004, Alsop published a book entitled Supercity which elicited much debate. It was the subject of a Channel 4 television documentary and an exhibition at the Urbis museum in Manchester. This book described his vision of a "Supercity" – a futuristic conurbation – stretching along the M62 corridor from Liverpool to Hull. It included a discussion of how the increasing interconnectivity of the cities along this corridor is changing the concepts of a "city", and how they can be developed to merge the idea of the rural and urban. It also included a number of architectural ideas of possible buildings and communities in this city. Although there was some political support for his ideas, with The Times claiming that former British Deputy Prime Minister John Prescott was a supporter, the Supercity has its critics.

Alsop featured significantly in Iain Sinclair's book Ghost Milk (2011), especially the chapter "In the belly of the architect". The book is a critique – written using the literary technique of psychogeography – of the capital used to drive through vanity planning projects such as the London Olympics, and Alsop's unbuilt planning projects in the north of England, such as Supercity, are seen as typical of these, where the architect fantasizes about how architectural design solves social and economic problems.

Alsop's architectural talents may be the subject of controversy built up an international reputation and a degree of celebrity and professional recognition, described by the Observer as "number three in the hierarchy of British architects after Lords Rogers and Foster".

Notwithstanding this, like fellow avantgardist Dame Zaha Hadid, he actualised relatively few buildings from his designs. Alsop estimated that only about 10% of his designs have been built, something he stated did not worry him because of the enjoyment he derived in designing buildings even without a particular commission or competition in mind. In a 2007 interview, Alsop stated "It's like tennis – you have to keep doing it all the time, whether you have a client or not. I believe that absolutely. You can speculate in your sketchbook – you're allowed to think about anything, with or without a client."

In April 2007, The Observer commented that Alsop's approach to architecture could broadly be defined by his statement: "I like people. I hope it shows."

== Major architectural projects ==
Image	Information	Awards and nominations
	Cardiff Bay Visitor Centre; Cardiff, Wales; Completed 1991, demolished 2010.	Royal Institute of British Architects (RIBA) Regional Award for Architecture (1991).; RIBA National Award for Architecture (1992)
	Hamburg Ferry Terminal; Hamburg-Altona, Germany; Completed 1993 (with de:Jan Störmer, Hamburg)	
	Hôtel du département des Bouches-du-Rhône (Le Grand Bleu); Marseille, Bouches-du-Rhône, France; Completed 1994 (with Brian Clarke)	Stirling Prize nominee (1997); RIBA Worldwide Projects Award (1997); RIBA Civic & Community Architecture Award (1995); Palmarés Award for Architecture (1995)
	North Greenwich tube station Greenwich, London, England; Completed 1999	Stirling Prize nominee (1999)
	Peckham Library; Peckham, London, England; Completed 2000	Stirling Prize (2000); Civic Trust Award (2003)
	Colorium; Düsseldorf, Germany; Completed 2001	
	Urban Entertainment Center Mixed-use complex with a hotel, shops and a casino Almere, Netherlands; Completed 2003	
	Sharp Centre for Design, Ontario College of Art & Design; Toronto, Ontario, Canada; Completed 2004	RIBA Worldwide Award (2004); City of Toronto Urban Design Award (2006)
	Fawood Children's Centre; Harlesden, North London, England; Completed in 2004	Stirling Prize nominee (2005)
	Ben Pimlott Building, Goldsmiths, University of London; New Cross, London, England; Completed 2005	
	Blizard Building, Barts and The London School of Medicine and Dentistry; Whitechapel, London, England; Completed March 2005	Civic Trust Award (2006); RIBA Regional Award (London) (2006)
	Alsop Toronto Sales Centre for Westside Lofts (1151 Queen Street West) Toronto, Ontario, Canada; Completed 2006	
	Palestra, 197; Blackfriars Road, Southwark, London, England; Completed 2006	RIBA Regional Award (London) (2007); Private Eye magazine Sir Hugh Casson Award for the Worst New Building (2006)
	Quay Redevelopment project Clarke Quay, Singapore; Completed 2006	
	The Public, West Bromwich; West Bromwich, West Midlands, England; Part completed 2008	Private Eye magazine Sir Hugh Casson Award for the Worst New Building (2008)
	Stratford Docklands Light Railway Station; Stratford, London, England; Commissioned in 2003, completed in 2007	
	Yonkers Power Plant project Glenwood Waterfront, Yonkers, New York, United States; Completion expected in 2008	
	KingTowns; King West Village, Toronto, Ontario, Canada; Estimated completion date unknown	
	New Islington; Manchester, England; Completed 2009	
	Westside Gallery Lofts; 1151 Queen Street West – 8-storey condo lofts (135 units) Toronto, Ontario, Canada; Completed 2012	
	Raffles City; Apartment Hotel Beijing, China; Completed 2009	2008 Cityscape Asia Awards, Best Future Mixed-Use Development
	Gao Yang; International Cruise Terminal Shanghai, China; Completed 2009/2010	
	Testbed1; Cultural Centre Battersea, London; Completed 2009	

== Academic appointments and honorary positions ==
Alsop was an ongoing professor of architecture at the Vienna University of Technology and received many honorary doctorates such as the honorary Doctorate of Civil Law (DCL) by the University of East Anglia and honorary doctorates at Ryerson University and OCAD University.

- 1997-Ongoing Professor, Technical University of Vienna
- 1997 Professor, The London Institute
- 1990 Visiting professor, University of Hanover
- 1988 Unit Master, Architectural Association
- 1986 Visiting professor, Bremen Academy of Art & Music
- 1984 Visiting professor, Royal Melbourne Institute Design
- 1984 Visiting professor, New South Wales Institute of Technology
- 1982 The Davis Professor, Tulane University, New Orleans
- 1977 Visiting professor, San Francisco Institute of Art
- 1977 Visiting professor, Ball State University, Indiana
- 1973 Tutor in Sculpture, St Martin's School of Art

== Exhibitions ==
Alsop was known to be constantly drawing and painting either for his architectural work or for his own sake. His paintings and sketches have been exhibited alongside his architectural projects in dedicated exhibitions at Sir John Soane's Museum, Milton Keynes Gallery, Cube Gallery in Manchester, and the British Pavilion at the Venice Biennale, among other venues.

Alsop was a patron of the charity The Nightingale Project, which uses the arts to enhance the environment in hospitals, and has exhibited his paintings in a London hospital under the auspices of this charity. Alsop also conducted a series of workshops with psychiatric patients at London's St Charles, Chelsea and Westminster hospitals, creating large communal artworks. He has been chair of the board of Trustees of The Architecture Foundation.

Major exhibitions:

- 2011 – Proper Behaviour in the Park, Royal Academy of Arts, London
- 2007 – Towards..., Chelsea Space, London
- 2007 – Future City, The Barbican, London
- 2007 – Cultural Fog, Olga Korper Gallery, Toronto
- 2007 – Bathing Beauties, The Hub:National Centre for Craft & Design, Lincolnshire
- 2007 – Creative Prisons, Touring exhibition
- 2005 – Supercities, Urbis, Manchester
- 2005 – Groundswell; MoMA, New York City
- 2004 – Middlehaven Masterplan, Venice Biennale
- 2002 – Malagarba Works, Will Alsop & Bruce McLean: Milton Keynes Gallery
- 2002 – All Barnsley Might Dream, Venice Biennale
- 2002 – Beauty, Joy & the Real, Sir John Soane Museum, London
- 2001 – Not Architecture, Aedes East Gallery, Berlin
- 2000 – Venice Biennale, British Pavilion
- 2000 – National Institute of Architecture (NAI), Rotterdam
- 1998 – Alsop Paintings & Architecture, Architekturgalerie, Stuttgart
- 1997 – River of Dreams, Mayor Gallery, London
- 1995 – Exhibition of Paintings, The Mayor Gallery, London
- 1992 – Selected Projects Exhibition, Aedes Gallery, Berlin
- 1992 – Arc en Rêve, Hôtel du Département, Marseilles, Bordeaux
- 1987 – Bridge/Beam/Floor/Roof, The Architecture Centre, Bremen
- 1985 – Paris Biennale Exhibition
- 1974 – Group Exhibition: Fruit Market, Edinburgh

== Personal life ==
Alsop and his wife lived between an Edwardian mansion flat in London and a converted stable block in Norfolk. They have three adult children.

He had a twin sister, Elizabeth, who still lives in Northampton.

Alsop would try to relax as much as possible on weekends and also took a month off in the summer to go painting in Menorca with his friend Bruce McLean. Alsop enjoyed smoking and drinking. He was, according to an April 2007 article in The Observer, "obviously not a man familiar with gyms".

Alsop died in London after a short illness on 12 May 2018 at the age of 70.
