= Carroll Go-Sam =

Indigenous Australian architect and academic

Carroll Go-Sam is an Indigenous Australian architect and academic.

Carroll Go-Sam was born in Queensland and is of Dyirbal gumbilbara bama heritage with ties to the Tully, Herbert and Wild River region near Ravenshoe, North Queensland. She studied architecture at the University of Queensland, graduating with a B.Arch. with Honours in 1997.

== Career ==
After graduation, Go-Sam was a Research Fellow with the Aboriginal Environments Research Centre and later the Indigenous Design Place at the University of Queensland. Go-Sam is a senior lecturer in Indigenous Architecture themes and housing for public and civic spaces within the School of Architecture, Design and Planning, Aboriginal Environments Research Centre.

Her designs have been featured at TAKE2: Housing Design in Indigenous Australia and Gunyah Goondie Wurley: the Aboriginal Architecture of Australia. Go-Sam jointly organised the charrettes at the RR Memorial Forum held in June 2018. Her design work was included in the Shroud House Project of 2005.

She is a member of the Australian Institute of Architects (AIA) First Nations Advisory Working Group and Cultural Reference Panel.

== Published works ==
- Go-Sam, C. (2020). Dossier-rights and reclamations. Architecture Australia. 109 (2): 53.
- Go-Sam, C. (2020). Future indigeneity. Architecture Australia. 109 (2): 54.
- Hall, N., Memmott, P., Barnes, S., Redmond, A., Go-Sam, C., Nash, D., Frank, T., and Simpson, P. (2020). Pilyii Papulu Purrukaj-ji (Good housing to prevent sickness): a study of housing, crowding and hygiene-related infectious diseases in the Barkly Region, Northern Territory. Brisbane, Australia: The University of Queensland.
- Andrew, B., Neath, J., Marino, C. Gilbert, J., Phillips, C. and Go-Sam, C. (2019). Representation, remembrance and the Memorial. Landscape architecture Australia: 34–39.
- Milligan, B., Blake, C., Hall, N.L., Selvey, L., Grodecki, H., Jackson, G., Go-Sam, C., and Veronese, T. (2019). Safe and Healthy Drinking Water in Indigenous Local Government Areas Program: Service Delivery Model Prerequisites for Success. QWater Conference, Brisbane, Australia, 20 November 2019.
- Go-Sam, C. (2018). Indigeneity, agency and Australian civitas. Traditional dwellings and settlements review. 30 (1): 67.
- Go-Sam, C. (2018). Gaps in Indigenous repair. Repair: Australian Pavilion. Edited by Mauro Baracco and Louise Wright. New York: Actar Publishers, 64–73.
- Go-Sam, C. and Keys, C. (2018) Mobilising Indigenous agency through cultural sustainability in architecture: are we there yet? The handbook of contemporary Indigenous architecture. Edited by Elizabeth Grant, Kelly Greenop, Albert L. Refiti, and Daniel J. Glenn. Singapore: Springer Nature: 347–380.
- Go-Sam, C. (2018). Do Yugambeh-Bundjalung cultural landscapes matter? Architecture Australia. 107 (1): 51–53.
- Memmott, P. and Go-Sam, C. (2016). Shifting Australian Indigenous Settlements. Traditional Dwellings and Settlements Working Paper Series. 278: 1-23.
- Memmott, P., Go-Sam, C., Dewi, P., Budiyanto, H., Safeyah, M., Hasan, R. and Shan, J. (2016). History and the legitimacy of historic structures. Berkeley, CA : IASTE : CEDR.
- Go-Sam, C. and Memmott, P. (2016). Remote indigenous settlements-more than tiny dots on a map. Architecture Australia. 105 (5): 53–54.
- Go-Sam, C. (2014). Assimilating problems: from humpies to traditional houses. SAHANZ. 31: 435–447.
- Habibis, D., Memmott, P., Phillips, R. Go-Sam, C., Keys, C. and Moran, M. (2013). Housing conditionality, Indigenous lifeworlds and policy outcomes: toward a resonseive housing provision. AHURI Final Report Series. 7-86.
- Go-Sam, C. (2012). Resisting Brisbane. Finding Country Project. Part of the 13th International Architecture Exhibition in Venice, Italy from 29 August-29 September 2012.
- Davidson, J., Go-Sam, C. Memmott, P. and Grant, E. (2012). Building new housing in remote Indigenous communities. AHURI Research and Policy Bulletin.
- Memmott, P., Greenop, K., Clarke, A., Go-Sam, C., Birdsall-Jones, C. (2012). NATSISS crowding data: What does it assume and how can we challenge the orthodoxy? Survey Analysis for Indigenous Policy in Australia: Social Science Perspectives. Edited by Boyd Hunter and Nicholas Biddle. Canberra, Australia: ANU E Press. 241–279.
- Memmott, P., Birdsall-Jones, C., Go-Sam, C., Greenop, K. and Corunna, V. (2011). Modelling crowding in Aboriginal Australia. AHURI positioning paper. i-52.
- Go-Sam, C. (2011). Fabricating blackness: Aboriginal identity constructs in the production and authorisation of architecture. Society of Architectural Historians, Australia and New Zealand (SAHANZ) Annual Conference, Brisbane, QLD, Australia, 7–10 July 2011. Brisbane, QLD, Australia: Society of Architectural Historians, Australia and New Zealand (SAHANZ).
- Davidson, J., Memmott, P., Go-Sam, C. and Grant, E. (2011). Remote Indigenous housing procurement: a comparative study. AHURI Final Report (167) i-144.
- Go-Sam, C. (2010). Sep Yama: "Ground you cannot see" Finding Country: a primer (exhibition review). Interstices: Journal of Architecture and Related Arts. 11: 154–159.
- Davidson, J., Go-Sam, C. and Memmott, P. (2010). Remote Indigenous housing procurement and post-occupancy outcomes: A comparative study. AHURI Positioning Paper 129 1-74.
- Memmott, P., Passi, C., Go-Sam, C., Thomson, L. and Sheppard, L. (2009). Family violence in the Torres Strait: a report commissioned by the Queensland Department of Community Services.
- Go-Sam, C. (2008). 'Lest We Forget': Working with and against Indigenous design paradigms. Architecture Australia. 97 (5): 53.
- Memmott, P. and Go-Sam, C. (2007). Spinifex houses of the western desert. Gunyah, goondie & wurley: The Aboriginal architecture of Australia. Edited by Paul C. Memmott. St Lucia, Queensland: University of Qld Press. 208–231.
- Memmott, P., Chambers, C., Go-Sam, C. and Thomson, L. (2006). Good practice in Indigenous family violence prevention: designing and evaluating successful programs. Issues paper 11. University of NSW, Sydney: Australian Domestic and Family Violence Clearinghouse.
- Memmott, P., Channells, G., Go-Sam, C., Stacy, R., Spring, F. and Taylor, S. (2004). Evaluation report of National Indigenous Family Violence Grants Program of the Office of the Status of Women. The University of Qld, St Lucia, Qld: Paul Memmott and Associates in association with AERC.
- Memmott, P. and Go-Sam, C. (2003). Interim emerging good practice report: Round 03 of the Mentoring and Evaluation Scheme for the National Indigenous Family Violence Grants Programme (NIFVGP). St Lucia, Qld, Australia: Aboriginal Environments Research Centre, University of Queensland.
- Memmott, P. and Go-Sam, C. (2003). Synthesising Indigenous Housing Paradigms: An Introduction to TAKE 2. TAKE 2: 12–17.
- Memmott, P. and Go-Sam, C. (2000). Aboriginal architecture. Edited by Kleinert, S. and Neale, M.. Melbourne: Oxford University Press: 405–413.
- Memmott, P. and Go-Sam, C. (1999). Australian Indigenous architecture: its forms and evolution. Thresholds, Launceston/Hobart, 28 Sept - 1 Oct, 1999. Launceston, Tas: SAHANZ
- Calma, T., Go-Sam, C., Ahmat, R., Chaney, F., Pholeros, P. and Haynen, O. Fixing houses, busting myths. National Indigenous Housing Conference. Architecture Australia. 97 (1). 40.
