= Mayi-Kutuna people =

Aboriginal Australian people

The Mayi-Kutuna, also spelt Mayaguduna and Maikudunu, are an Aboriginal Australian people of the Cape York Peninsula in the state of Queensland, whose language has become extinct.

== Country ==
In Norman Tindale's estimation, the Maikudunu 's tribal territories stretched over roughly 9,800 square kilometres (3,800 sq mi), from Augustus Downs in the north to midway along the Leichardt River. Their southern extension lay around Mount Cuthbert. Their western limits ran to the eastern margin of the inland plateau.

== Alternative names ==
- Mayi-Yali
- Maikudun, Maikudung
- Maigudung
- Mikoodoono
- Maigudina
- Mygoodan, Mygoodano, Mayagoondoon
- Mikadoon
- Mikoolun

== Sources ==
- Tindale, Norman Barnett (1974). "Maikudunu(QLD)". Aboriginal Tribes of Australia: Their Terrain, Environmental Controls, Distribution, Limits, and Proper Names. Australian National University Press.
- Turnbull, W. (10 August 1896a). "Lower Leichhardt River and coast dialect of Mikadoon tribe". Australasian Anthropological Journal. 1 (1): 13.
- Turnbull, W. (10 August 1896b). "On sea coast and the estuary of Leichhardt". Australasian Anthropological Journal. 1 (1): 13.
- Turnbull, W. (21 February 1903). "Correspondence. Armrynald, Burketown". Science of Man. 6 (1): 9–11.
- Turnbull, W. (1 August 1911). "Investigations in Minikin and Mikadoon tribes". Science of Man. 13 (4): 79–80.
