= Paul Memmott =

Australian architect, anthropologist and academic

Paul Memmott AO
- Occupations: architect, anthropologist, academic
- Known for: Director of the Aboriginal Environments Research Centre at the University of Queensland

Paul Christopher Memmott AO is an Australian architect, anthropologist, academic and the Director of the Aboriginal Environments Research Centre at the University of Queensland. He is an expert on topics related to Indigenous architecture and vernacular architecture, housing, homelessness and overcrowding.

== Early life ==
Paul Memmott was born to married couple Estelle "Cootch" Powell and Harry Memmott who were both pottery artists. He took art classes from Mervin Moriarty before enrolling at the University of Queensland. His program was influenced by student protests of human rights at the university in the late 1960s and early 1970s, as well as lecturers who considered art and architectural psychology as integral to the discipline. He tutored in art and exhibited as part of the Contemporary Art Society, Queensland. He graduated with a B.Arch in 1972.

== Career ==
As part of his professional placement Memmott worked for the Queensland State Works Department and was recruited to join a project organised by Nugget Coombs to visit Mt Isa and Cloncurry where an Aboriginal community centre was to be constructed. He and fellow students formed a group called the Aboriginal Development Group as they looked at the fringe camps of the region, many before they were destroyed. The group would become the precursor of the Aboriginal Environments Research Centre at the University of Queensland. His analysis of Indigenous design led to a post graduate scholarship on the spatial behaviour of Aboriginal people in North West Queensland. Memmott studied social anthropology in 1974 and commenced his PhD, with Bruce Rigsby as one of his supervisors. He helped establish an Aboriginal Data Archive in 1976. He completed his PhD in 1979 at the University of Queensland. He established a research consultancy practice in 1980, for architectural and anthropological work. This led to work in Aboriginal land rights claims, native title claims and submissions to courts. Memmott is a lecturer at the University of Queensland and is a Director of the Aboriginal Environments Research Centre at the university.

Memmott has published over 300 publications and has supervised over 50 postgraduate students.

== Exhibition work ==
- Wild Australia: Meston's Wild Australia Show 1892-1893 (2015) – joint curator
- Camps, cottages, and homes: A brief history of Indigenous housing in Queensland, University of Queensland Anthropology Museum (2022) - joint curator with Timothy O'Rourke, Michael Aird and Mandana Mapar).

== Awards ==
- Australian Award for University Teaching - AAUT – Indigenous education
- 2008: Bates Smart Award for Architecture in the Media of the RACI, Victoria Chapter, for the book Gunyah, Goondie and Wurley: Aboriginal Architecture of Australia
- 2008: Best designed reference and scholarly book at the National Book Design Awards, for Gunyah, Goondie and Wurley: Aboriginal Architecture of Australia
- 2009: Stanner Award for Gunyah, Goondie and Wurley: Aboriginal Architecture of Australia
- 2015: AIA Neville Quarry Award
- 2018: Best Exhibit, Australian Architectural Exhibit, Venice Biennale (Team led by Baracco + Wright Architects, Melbourne)

== Honours and recognition ==
- Fellow, Academy of Social Sciences (Australia), 2014
- Life Fellow, Australian Institute of Architects
- Fellow, Australian Anthropological Society
- Officer of the Order of Australia for "distinguished service to ethno-architecture and anthropology, to Indigenous housing and cultural heritage, and to tertiary education"

== Published works ==
- Memmott, Paul (1991). Humpy, house and tin shed - Aboriginal settlement history on the Darling river. Sydney, Australia: Ian Buchan Fell Research Centre.
- Memmott, P. C. (2001). Queensland Aboriginal co-ordinating council: Model housing management policies. Cairns: Aboriginal Co-ordinating Council.
- Memmott, Paul and McDougall, Scott (2003). Holding Title and Managing Land in Cape York: Indigenous Land Management and Native Title. Perth, Western Australia: National Native Title Tribunal.
- Memmott, Paul. (2003). TAKE 2: Housing Design in Indigenous Australia. Canberra, Australia: Royal Australian Institute of Architects.
- Brereton, David, Memmott, Paul, Reser, Joseph, Buultjens, Jeremy, Thomson, Linda, Barker, Tanuja, O'Rourke, Timothy and Chambers, Catherine (2007). Mining and indigenous tourism in Northern Australia. Gold Coast, QLD, Australia.: Co-operative Research Centre (CRC) for Sustainable Tourism.
- Long, Stephen J. and Memmott, Paul C. (2007). Demand responsive services to desert settlements: Northwest Queensland and Eastern Northern Territory: Annual plan (2007-2008) and mid-term report (2006-2007). St Lucia: Aboriginal Environments Research Centre.
- Memmott, Paul C. (2007). Gunyah, Goondie & Wurley: Aboriginal architecture in Australia. Brisbane, Australia: University of Queensland Press.
- O'Rourke, Tim and Memmott, Paul (2007). Constructing cultural tourism opportunities in the Queensland wet tropics: Dyirbalngan campsites and dwellings. Striving for Sustainability: Case Studies in Indigenous Tourism. (pp. 371–402) edited by J. Buultjens and D. Fuller. Lismore, NSW: Southern Cross University Press.
- Memmott, Paul and Blackwood, Peter (2008). Holding title and managing land in Cape York: Two case studies. Research discussion paper / Australian Institute of Aboriginal and Torres Strait Islander Studies, 1323–9422; no. 21 Acton, ACT, Australia: Native Title Research Unit, Australian Institute of Aboriginal and Torres Strait Islander Studies.
- Memmott, P., Dalley, C., Rosendahl, S., Ulm, S., Stock, E. and Robins, R. (2008). The Wellesley Ranger Training Program for 2007. University of Qld, St Lucia, Australia: Aboriginal Environments Research Centre.
- Memmott, Paul. (2008). The Heart of Everything: The Art and Artists of Mornington and Bentinck Islands,. Fitzroy: McCulloch & McCulloch Australian Art Books.
- Eringa, K., Spring, F., Anda, M., Memmott, P., Long, S. and West, M. (2008). Scoping the Capacity of Indigenous Community Housing Organisations. AHURI Final Report No. 125 Western Australia Research Centre: The Australian Housing and Urban Research Institute, AHURI.
- Anda, M., Spring, F., West, M., Eringa, K., Memmott, Paul C. and Long, Stephen (2008). Scoping the capacity of Aboriginal community housing providers in NSW: Final report. Perth, Australia:
- Memmott, P., Dalley, C., Rosendahl, D., Ulm, S., Stock, E. and Robins, R. (2008). Report on the Wellesley Ranger Training Program for 2007. Aboriginal Environments Research Centre; Aboriginal & Torres Strait Islander Studies Unit, University of Queensland; Griffith University; Everick Heritage Consultants.
- Flatau, Paul, Slatter, Michelle, Baulderstone, Jo, Coleman, Anne, Long, Stephen, Memmott, Paul and Sheppard, Lee (2008). Sustaining at-risk indigenous tenancies. AHURI Positioning Papers; No. 104 Western Australia Research Centre: Australian Housing and Urban Research Institute.
- Eringa, Karel, Spring, Frederick, West, Mara, Anda, Martin, Memmott, Paul and Long, Stephen (2009). The capacity of Indigenous community housing organisations. AHURI Research and Policy Bulletin; 111 Melbourne, VIC, Australia: Australian Housing and Urban Research Institute.
- Moran, Mark, Anda, Martin, Elvin, Ruth, Kennedy, Annie, Long, Stephen, McFallan, Stephen, McGrath, Natalie, Memmott, Paul, Mulgan, Richard, Stanley, Oowen, Sullivan, Patrick, Tedmanson, Deirdre, Wright, Alyson and Young, Metta (2009). Desert Services that Work: Year One Research Report. Working Paper 30 Alice Springs, NT Australia: Desert Knowledge Cooperative Research Centre.
- Memmott, Paul, Hyde, Richard and O'Rourke, Tim (2009). Biomimetic theory and building technology: Use of aboriginal and scientific knowledge of spinifex grass. Architectural Science Review, 52 (2), 117–125. doi: 10.3763/asre.2009.0014
- Memmott, Paul (2010). Material Culture of the North Wellesley Islands. St Lucia, QLD, Australia: ATSIS Unit (University of Queensland).
- Memmott, Paul (2010). Demand responsive services and culturally sustainable enterprise in remote Aboriginal settings: A case study of the Myuma Group. DKCRC Report Alice Springs, NT, Australia: Desert Knowledge Cooperative Research Centre.
- Buultjens, Jeremy, Brereton, David, Memmott, Paul, Reser, Joseph, Thomson, Linda and O’Rourke, Tim (2010). The mining sector and indigenous tourism development in Weipa, Queensland. Tourism Management, 31 (5), 597–606. doi: 10.1016/j.tourman.2009.06.009
- Haynes, Michele, O'Rourke, Timothy, Nash, Daphne, Baffour, Bernard, York, Sue, Chainey, Carys, Betros, Georgia and Memmott, Paul (2019). Aboriginal and Torres Strait Islander preferences for healthcare settings: effective use of design images in survey research. Australian Health Review, 44 (2), 222–227. doi: 10.1071/AH18196
- O'Rourke, Timothy, Nash, Daphne, Haynes, Michele, Burgess, Meredith and Memmott, Paul (2020). Cross-cultural design and healthcare waiting rooms for Indigenous people in regional Australia. Environment and Behaviour, 001391652095244. doi: 10.1177/0013916520952443
- Nash, Daphne, O’Rourke, Timothy, Memmott, Paul and Haynes, Michele (2020). Indigenous preferences for inpatient rooms in Australian hospitals: a mixed-methods study in cross-cultural design. HERD: Health Environments Research & Design Journal, 1937586720925552. doi: 10.1177/1937586720925552
